= Norm Rapmund =

American comic book inker

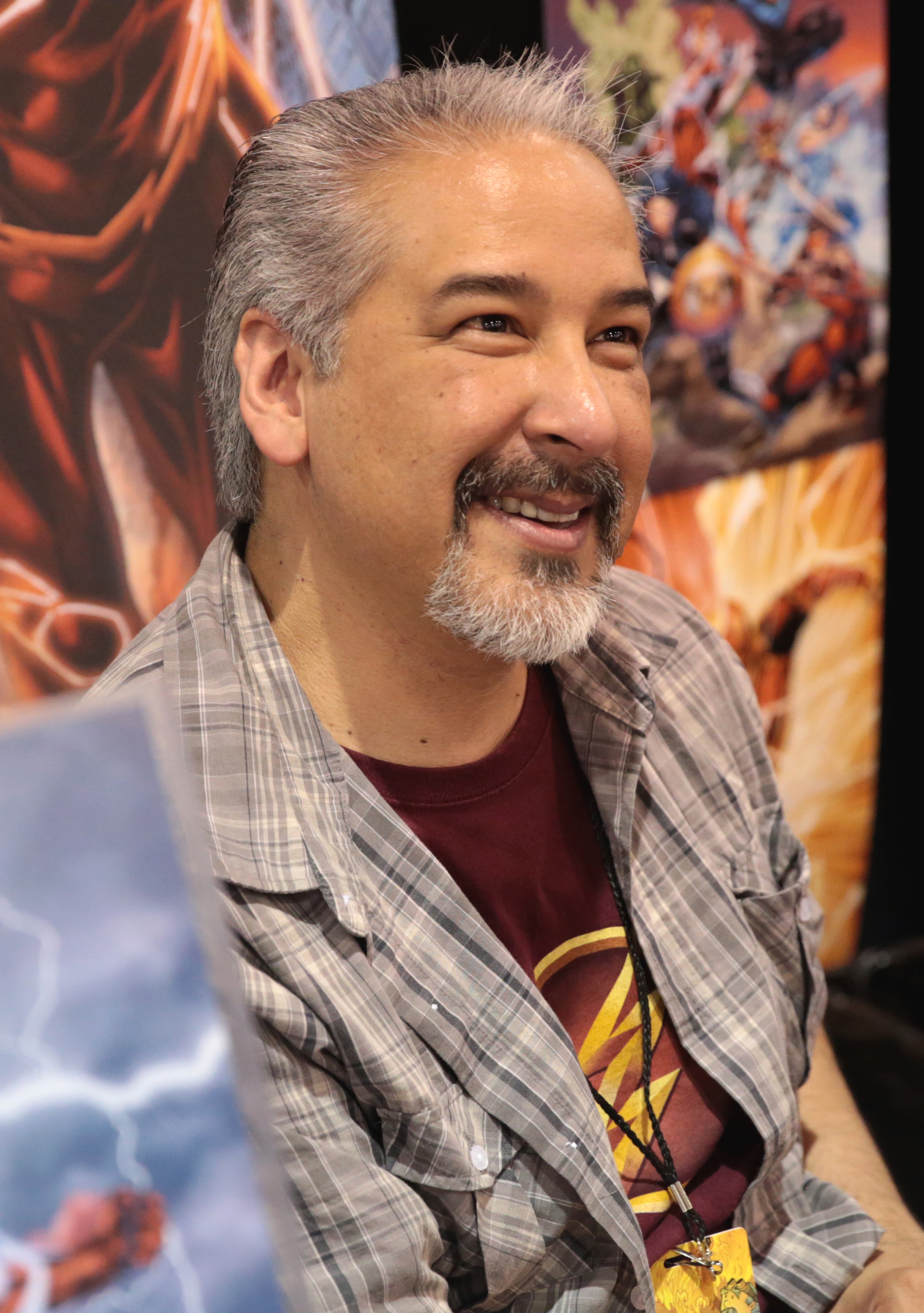
- Norm Rapmund at the 2017 Phoenix Comicon
- Area: Inker
- Awards: Inkwell Awards Favorite Inker (2014); Inkwell Awards Most Adaptable Inker (2021); Inkwell Awards Most Adaptable Inker (2022)

Norm Rapmund is an American comic book inker.

== Career ==
=== Image Comics and Marvel ===
Rapmund's career began with Image Comics' Brigade #1 in 1992. He worked on the series concurrently with Image titles Bloodstrike and Team Youngblood until 1994, when he moved from Brigade to Supreme. Rapmund worked on several series under the Image banner (including the Extreme Studios and Maximum Press imprints), and in 1997 inked several issues of Alan Moore's Supreme: The New Adventures as well as issue #3 of Alan Moore's Judgment Day limited series. Work on a pair of 1997 Image/Marvel Comics crossover titles, Spider-Man/Badrock and Silver Surfer/Weapon Zero, led to more jobs with Marvel on Avengers, Iron Man, and Fantastic Four.

=== DC Comics ===
Rapmund began working primarily on DC Comics titles, starting in April 1998 with Teen Titans (vol. 2) #19; at the time the series was being written and pencilled by Dan Jurgens, who had written Spider-Man/Badrock. After the Titans series was canceled in September 1998 (issue #24), Rapmund inked various DC titles, including Superman, Superboy, Young Justice, and Action Comics. He worked on Aquaman vol. 5 from issue #50-75 (Dec. 1998 - Jan. 2001)

Starting in September 2000, Rapmund also inked issues of Marvel's Wolverine vol. 2 and X-Men, staying with these series after Aquaman ended in 2001. His work on Wolverine ended with the issue #179 cover (September 2002), and Rapmund continued inking various Marvel and DC titles, as well as Image Comics' Masters of the Universe, a series which coincided with the 2002-2003 revival of the 1980s He-Man franchise. Transitioning primarily to Marvel's Black Panther and Fantastic Four in late 2003, Rapmund worked heavily on X-Treme X-Men in early 2004 as well as returning to the Teen Titans, whose latest series was being written by Geoff Johns. This was followed by a stint with Marvel's Rogue from 2004 to 2005 and various other Marvel and DC titles, culminating with DC's Supergirl and Infinite Crisis from 2005 to 2006. Among his next titles were the DC limited series 52 and Countdown to Final Crisis in 2007, with Rapmund then on contract with DC Comics.

DC began a new Booster Gold series in October 2007, with art by Jurgens (who had created the character in 1986), Rapmund and (initial) co-writers Geoff Johns and Jeff Katz. He and Jurgens briefly left the title to work on Time Masters: Vanishing Point. At the conclusion of that series, it was announced that he would return to Booster Gold, along with Dan Jurgens, in May 2011 with Issue #44. Rapmund also worked on various other DC titles concurrently and has worked on several Flash comic books.

== Awards ==
Rapmund won the Inkwell Awards Favorite Inker Award in 2014. In 2016, Rapmund was nominated for the Inkwell Awards Most Adaptable award. In 2021, he won the Inkwell Awards Most Adaptable Inker. In 2022, he was awarded the Inkwell Awards Most Adaptable Inker again.
