= New Men (Image Comics) =

- Cover of the first issue

Publication information
- Publisher: Image Comics
- Main character(s): Reign; Pilot; Dash; Charade; Kodiak; Bootleg; Sundance; John Proctor; Byrd; Exit; Dusk; Narcisse

Creative team
- Created by: Rob Liefeld; Eric Stephenson; Marat Mychaels; Jeff Matsuda

New Men is a comic book series published during the 1990s by Image Comics. It was one of the many titles co-created by Rob Liefeld, and released as part of his Extreme Studios imprint. After an initial launch the series underwent a re-design and revamp by writer Eric Stephenson and penciler Chris Sprouse.

== Publication history ==
The New Men debuted during the Extreme Prejudice imprint-wide crossover in Brigade vol. 2 #8 (March 1994), written by Rob Liefeld and Eric Stephenson, and illustrated by Marat Mychaels. Following the end of the crossover story, they were given an eponymous 5-issue mini-series. This was a commonly used technique within Image, not just by Liefeld's Extreme Studios, but by most of the co-founders and their imprints. Many notable and top-selling Image titles including The Savage Dragon, Cyberforce and Gen^{13} started in this manner.

The 1994 mini-series was written by Eric Stephenson with art by character designer Jeff Matsuda. Matsuda, Stephenson and Liefeld were also credited as 'co-plotters'. New Men was then granted an ongoing series. Matsuda did not take up the art duties and most of the first 20 issues were penciled by Todd Nauck.

Both mini-series and ongoing series kept a much better schedule than a number of Extreme Comics titles, notably the imprint's 'premiere' title Youngblood. This could be attributed to the minimal role that Rob Liefeld played in the production of the series. Like all of the Extreme titles, a number of issues were taken up by the various imprint-wide crossover storylines, such as Extreme Sacrifice and Babewatch, and the characters, though not the series, were an integral part of the Extreme Destroyer crossover.

The series was put on hiatus with issue 20 for the Extreme Destroyer story and was replaced by a 4-issue mini-series, New Force, which starred the same characters and began their revamp. Nauck and Stephenson were again responsible for this.

The series resumed after this mini-series via Liefeld's Maximum Comics and received a further revamp, both in plot and style, by Stephenson and Chris Sprouse. With issue 22 the series was renamed Adventures of the New Men but despite improved reactions the title fizzled out, possibly due to the problems Liefeld was having with Image Comics and the subsequent problems following his resignation.

The title was not one of the books revived by Awesome Comics.

== Fictional history ==
The New Men were 'Nu-Gene' positive teenagers who had banded together supposedly for their own protection under the guidance of a middle-aged mentor. 'Nu-Genes' were Extreme Comics' universe's equivalent of Marvel's Mutants, and were also the in-universe explanation for mythical beasts such as fairies, centaurs, vampires and werewolves; initially thought to be a generic 'default' like the Mutant Gene, it was later revealed to have been the result of genetic tampering by a race of aliens (The Keep) as a way to sort the weak, and increase the strong. The New Men's mentor was also later revealed to have been a worshipper of this alien race, keeping the Nu-Genes for their eventual return to harvest them.

Initially the group was five teens: a telepath/telekinetic Reign (Jason Drew), who initially used a focusing gem he wore on his forehead, but later found it had mind-controlling properties and abandoned its use; Byrd (Adam Booth), who was friendly and laid back, began with small wings that protruded from his arms, but later evolved further growing feathers, talons and other bird-like features; a blonde speedster called Dash (Lisa Richards), who was involved in romantic relations with Byrd and Reign; Exit (Derrick Rowland), who could teleport via entering another dimension (he was later replaced by a being from this dimension, Charade); and Kodiak (Thomas Runningbear Jr.), the youngest member (who was apparently Native American), who could turn into a bestial form. Their mentor and leader was John Proctor, who was somewhat untrustworthy.

Around this time the New Men are called as part of the trial for the murder case against the Youngblood superhero Knightsabre, who had been accused of killing his teammate Riptide.

The events of their ongoing series introduced two old members, Dusk and Narcisse (a vampire), and the team gained two new members – Pilot, a time traveler who came back from the future to warn the New Men of the coming of The Keep and the truth about the Nu-Gene; and Bootleg, a student who could copy other's powers and use them. Another member was a young Australian man named Pastime, who was able to manipulate the flow of time. Although he only remained with the New Men for a short time he still formed close ties with the group. When not tying into the imprint-wide crossovers, the team fights against various re-occurring enemies and secret organisations, most of which tied into their being 'Nu-Gene Positive' (i.e. 'The Brotherhood of Man') though there was often combat with Khyber, an old ally/acquaintance/enemy of theirs. Of note, Dash experienced an accelerated pregnancy with Reign's child, a child that also suffered from accelerated growth and development, becoming an adult with a very short period of time. Exit was replaced by Charade and in the New Blood story arc the team also encountered The New Man (who was also granted his own short-running ongoing series), a time traveler who may have been Dash's child.

When the Keep eventually returned during the Extreme Destroyer crossover, Proctor's Keep sympathies were revealed and Reign killed him with a psychic blast in a rage. The New Men were among the many characters, including Youngblood's Shaft (who thought himself human) and Glory, who were captured by the Keep; Dash was branded by them. After this the team experienced a personal crisis and backlash to the event (against Nu-Genes) as New Force, including the destruction of their home (Proctor's house), and the loss of Dusk and Narcisse. They also gained their final new member, Sundance, a female alien pyrokinetic who was the herald of The Shepard, who led the Keep's return.

Following their revamp the team tried to live normal lives, but this, of course, did not last, and they encountered a shadowy organisation who sent a Chris Sprouse-designed character Bette Nior to kill them.
