= 1963 (comics) =

1993 comic book series by Alan Moore

- 1963 #1 cover, featuring Mystery Incorporated. Art by Rick Veitch and Dave Gibbons.

Publication information
- Publisher: Image Comics
- Schedule: Monthly
- Format: Limited series
- Genre: Superhero
- Publication date: April – October 1993
- No. of issues: 6
- Main character: See Characters

Creative team
- Written by: Alan Moore
- Penciller(s): Rick Veitch; Steve Bissette
- Inkers: Dave Gibbons; Don Simpson; John Totleben; Chester Brown
- Letterer(s): Don Simpson; John Workman
- Colorist(s): Rick Veitch (credited as Marvin Kilroy); Anthony Tollin

Collected editions
- Book One: Mystery Incorporated: ISBN 1-55013-062-5
- Book Two: No One Escapes... the Fury: ISBN 1-5638-9880-2
- Book Three: Tales of the Uncanny: ISBN 0-203-87131-6
- Book Four: Tales from Beyond: ISBN 8-8344-0547-1
- Book Five: Horus, Lord of Light: ISBN 0-9710-2495-2
- Book Six: The Tomorrow Syndicate: ISBN 0-9710-2496-0

1963 is an American six-issue comic book limited series written by Alan Moore in 1993, with art by his frequent collaborators Steve Bissette, John Totleben, and Rick Veitch. Dave Gibbons, Don Simpson, and Jim Valentino also contributed art. Image Comics published the series.

The six issues are an homage to the Silver Age of American comics (in particular, the early Marvel Comics), and feature spoof text pieces and advertisements.

== Creation ==
Ashcans for the characters were created in 1992 before the series was announced in spring 1993, and marked Alan Moore's return to superhero comics after announcing his retirement from the genre in 1989, with 1963 as a banner title for six one-shots – Mystery Incorporated, The Fury, Tales of the Uncanny, Tales from Beyond, Horus – Lord of Light and The Tomorrow Syndicate, to be followed by an 80-page 1963 Annual drawn by Jim Lee. His initial intention was to create old-fashioned Silver Age-style heroes to contrast with the grimmer characters that made up Image Comics' output at that point, with a direct crossover in the concluding annual. His train of thought was that in a Silver Age morality, the likes of Spawn and Shadowhawk would have been considered villains for their violent methods, but also felt it would show evolving gender roles in the medium. While Moore had long fallen out with both Marvel and their rival DC, he remained fond of their Silver Age output. The series was assigned to Jim Valentino's Shadowline imprint.

Moore worked with several artists he had previously collaborated with on the series – notably having worked alongside Bissette, Veitch and Totleben on his acclaimed Saga of the Swamp Thing run. All involved worked for low page rates, hoping to profit from long-term royalties for the creator-owned work. In addition to the comic stories being pastiches of the Silver Age material of Stan Lee and Jack Kirby, the issues featured additional pages parodying the material found in Marvel comics of the period. Each creator was given bombastic, alliterative nicknames – 'Affable' Al, 'Sturdy' Steve, 'Roarin' Rick and 'Jaunty John' – while the "Sixty-Three Sweatshop" column mirrored the style and content of Lee's "Bullpen Bulletins"/"Stan's Soapbox" columns, with the letters pages also containing fake missives in the style of those from the period, complete with replies from 'Al'. Also included were mock contemporary advertisements, satirising many of the services displayed in comics of the time such as Charles Atlas' fitness programmes. The parody was not entirely affectionate; 'Affable' Al was implied to be an amoral self-promoter and credit-hog, referencing Lee and Marvel's legal disputes with Kirby and Steve Ditko while vociferously defending his work for hire policy. Al also advertised his book How I Created Everything All by Myself and Why I Am Great – a reference to Lee's own Origins of Marvel Comics, which has been criticised for overplaying the writer's part in the fertile Marvel Silver Age at the expense of his collaborators. The series even went as far as to use newsprint stock to replicate the feel of 1960s comics, rather than the high-quality gloss stock used by other Image titles, while the creators also gave in-character interviews to Tom Fields for an issue of British magazine Comic Talk.

== Publishing history ==
The six one-shots appeared as scheduled and sold well; the first issue was Diamond Comic Distributors' 15th best-selling title of June 1993, with the second 29th the following month, the third 68th in June, the fourth 71st in July, the fifth 85th in August and the sixth 87th for September. Bissette recollected the issues sold between 300,000 and 500,000 copies each, earning Bissette and the other contributors a significant amount of money.

However, the annual – slated to feature the 1963 characters crossing over with the Image Universe characters WildC.A.T.s, Spawn, Shadowhawk, Youngblood, Savage Dragon and Supreme – failed to appear. Moore was halfway through writing it when Jim Lee announced he was taking a year-long sabbatical from drawing comics to focus on his growing business role within Image. Letterer Don Simpson would later accuse Lee of never planning to work on the annual as part of a plan to sabotage the series. Bissette would later state he felt Valentino had brought Alan Moore to Image in the hope that 1963 would function as a gateway for the acclaimed writer working on other Shadowline characters, something which saw the series' creative team caught in a political crossfire as the relationship between the founding Image partners began to fray. Moore himself was rapidly tapped to work on other Image titles including Spawn, Violator and WildC.A.T.s.

=== Appearances in other comics ===
The Tomorrow Syndicate are among the characters to be featured outside of the original limited series in Big Bang Comics #35 (January 2001), while the Fury appeared in Shadowhawk #14 (October 1994) and Noble Causes: Family Secrets #3 (December 2002).

== Completion attempts ==
Fellow Image Rob Liefeld was planned to work on the annual, but left the company in acrimonious circumstances in 1996 to found Awesome Comics – meaning none of his characters could be used for 1963; Shaft of Youngblood had featured in the cliffhanger ending to No. 6. Further problems came when Moore fell out with Bissette in 1996 after the writer took offence at comments Bissette had made in an interview in The Comics Journal #185 (cover dated March 1996). In a 2010 interview with Comic Book Resources, Bissette claimed to still be unaware at what exactly had caused the rift, having only found out Moore had taken umbrage through mutual acquaintance Neil Gaiman. An attempt to find out from Moore himself via phone was met with the curt reply "Right, Steve? I'll keep this short. Don't call me, don't write me, as far as I'm concerned, it's over, mate." – at which point Moore hung up.

Bissette, Moore and Veitch began communicating in 1998 to divide ownership of the various characters created for 1963. In 2002, Wizard Magazine included the series in a sidebar of an article on the greatest comic stories never told, noting that it was unlikely to ever be finished. Over the following years Bissette and Veitch worked to create a collected edition of the material, with Moore deigning to contact the pair by email for some time. Asked about the series in 2007, Erik Larsen – one of the founders remaining at Image Comics – stated he felt the "ship may have sailed" for completing the work. Nevertheless, some work continued when the trio could find time. After rejecting what the trio considered a derisive buy-out offer from DC Comics, they came close to a deal with Dynamite Entertainment in January 2009. However, after this collapsed in 2010, Bissette used his blog to announce negotiations had fallen through, and that even a collected edition of the already-published material was unlikely during his lifetime.

In 2022, Simpson announced plans to create his own version of the 1963 Annual as a solo work. Fueled by a dispute over a reprint of an unrelated Moore-scripted story which the writer refused to allow his name to be used for, Simpson's cover for the annual featured the strap line 'Fuck "Al"', complete with a caricature of an irate Moore in the corner box. Posting in-progress pages on his Facebook account, Simpson also included comments that indicated he believed Moore's intransigence and ego were as much responsible for 1963's collapse as the oft-blamed Image partners.

== Plot ==
=== Book One: Mystery Incorporated ===
Mystery Incorporated test the Mystery Mile's new defence system. Despite their seeming success a hooded stranger arrives inside via the Maybe Machine, and soon afterwards the highly advanced defence system turns on the team. The masked invader captures Kid Dynamo, while Crystal Man deduces the stranger is from a parallel universe. The remaining trio enter the Maybe Machine to recover their team-mate.

=== Book Two: No One Escapes... the Fury ===
The Fury is engaged by Commander Sky Solo of L.A.S.E.R. to escort the secret Cargo X to their headquarters under the United Nations Building. The convoy is attacked by jet-vested Raiders; chasing them down the Fury is also attacked by enemy Voidoid. Cargo X meanwhile turns out to be a cryogenically frozen three-eyed talking dinosaur with opposable thumbs, which escapes and interrupts the fight between the Fury and the Voidoid. The Fury is saved by Solo's intervention and ducks out of the battle to phone his mother, who believes he is at school. He defeats the monster and is able to get back without blowing his secret.

=== Book Three: Tales of the Uncanny ===
==== U.S.A. – Ultimate Special Agent ====
U.S.A. uses his abilities to take the place of President Jack Kennedy in Dallas following a tip-off, drawing out the assassin. However, the would-be assassin vanishes, and U.S.A. finds a brainwashed doppelganger tied up in a book depository. The latter is Leo Harley Osbourne, who was under police observation; the double however seems to have disabled other would-be assassins stationed at the Grassy Knoll. U.S.A. investigates and discovers Osbourne is a member of the Communist Party, recently returned from a trip to Russia. He realises the plot is linked to villain Red Brain, and foils the latter's plan to assassinate Osbourne. However, Red Brain turns the nearby police into brainwashed Communist zombies. U.S.A. is nearly defeated until he is saved by the Osbourne double, who only gives oblique explanations for his actions before disappearing.

==== The Hypernaut ====
The Hypernaut and his twin-headed monkey Queep are relaxing on the Hyperbase behind the Moon when they come under attack from a being from the fourth dimension. Due to the creature's ability to occupy an extra dimension the battle is difficult, and the Hypernaut is seemingly destroyed. However, he preserves his intelligence in his cerebro-sphere and is able to slip between the invader's atoms, disrupting the four-dimensional being and sending it fleeing back to its home dimension. Hypernaut is then able to transfer to a spare body.

=== Book Four: Tales from Beyond ===
==== The Unbelievable N-Man ====
The N-Man investigates a high-radiation zone in the Yucca Flats. An atomic bomb test has created a pocket of mutant animals and plants. He is attacked by mutated Soviet scientist Grigor Kokarovitch, who traps him in a lake of setting molten glass. N-Man breaks free and Kokarovitch is sucked into a collapsing Neutron Bead at the centre of the zone, while N-Man escapes to safety.

==== Johnny Beyond ====
Johnny Beyond encounters a lost woman searching for a bar called The Laundry who speaks strangely and has a telephone in her purse and keeps mentioning feminism. He offers to walk her home but she takes him to his own apartment block. Once inside he is further confused by the plastic cases on her books and coasters in cigarette cases before finding out she is married to an older version of himself called John Behan. Confused, he and the woman go outside, only for the house to fold it on itself. She runs back up to find her room inhabited by saxophonist 'Lips' Lincoln. Beyond contacts his mentor Garab Dorje via Necrosphere, who warns them the building is twisted in time. He tries to return everyone to their correct times but he himself is sucked through before he finishes the job.

=== Book Five: Horus, Lord of Light ===
Horus saves New York from the rampaging Termagant and returns to his civilian guise of academic Professor Falcon. However, after lectures finish he changes back and is spotted by student Janet, who sneaks herself into a sarcophagus on his Barge from Beyond as he sets off to pay homage to Ra. Set attempts to provoke Horus before their bickering is interrupted by Isis. Set however drugs the crew of Ra's barge, leaving the Sun God dormant. Horus boards Ra's barge and guides it through attempted attacks by Nehebkau and Astarte, despite the unexpected presence of Janet. She is captured by Anubis but Horus rescues her despite briefly awakening Herakhty. They guide the barge home regardless, but Janet is put on trial for blasphemy. She is spared when Osiris himself objects from beyond the grave. Horus returns a sleeping Janet to Midtown College and turns back into Falcon, convincing her the adventure was a dream.

=== Book Six: The Tomorrow Syndicate ===
Inframan and Infragirl summon Horus, U.S.A., N-Man, and Hypernaut to the Tomorrow Complex to investigate Voidoid's alien weapons, recovered by the Fury. The team track two sources of similar radiation on Earth, in New York. They travel there in the Tomorrobile, which Infra-Man shrinks so they can go underground to the radiation source, emerging in the Mystery Mile, with the Fury following. They decide to head to the Maybe Machine and see numerous parallel versions of themselves and head to a huge floating complex along with their variants, finding themselves in the Lobby of Alternity. They manage to find out where Mystery Incorporated were heading and set off again in the Tomorrobile and follow them to an alternate Earth, finding evil versions of themselves. The Tomorrow Syndicate are able to escape after defeating their doubles and continue the search before tracking Mystery Incorporated to a "harsh, vivid" world. The hooded stranger meanwhile emerges with the captured Kid Dynamo, revealing himself to be Shaft.

== Characters ==
=== The Fury ===
Son of World War II hero the Ragin' Fury, Richard 'Rick' Judge takes up the role of the Fury at the behest of his dying father and against the wishes of his mother, who believes he is undertaking a normal school education. The Fury has no powers, instead relying on a pair of wrist-launched discuses. Among his rogues are the Voidoid (whose secret identity is someone who knows Rick in everyday life) and the rest of the Threatening Three (Pyroman and the Dune). He has considerable doubts over choosing to be a hero rather than staying in school and while he claims to have never killed anyone he is distinctly careless in combat, putting numerous foes in potentially lethal situations.

The character is modelled on Spider-Man.

=== Johnny Beyond ===
John Behan is capable of projecting an ectoplasm version of himself called a Tulpa, one of many skills he learnt from Garab Dorje on his path to becoming a Ngagpa. Despite being an inhabitant of 1963 he speaks entirely in 1950s beatnik slang.

The character is based on Doctor Strange.

=== Mystery Incorporated ===
When an asteroid comes close to Earth, the government sent up physicist Craig Crandall, astronaut Biff Baker and students Tommy Baker and Jeannie Morrow to investigate via rocket. They discover alien statues which transform them into superpowered beings. They form a crimefighting team called Mystery Incorporated and establish an underground base called the Mystery Mile, fighting villains such as Amazonia, Doc Apocalypse and King Zero, becoming popular celebrities for their heroism.

The characters are modelled on the Fantastic Four.

- Crystal Man: Craig Crandall is the de facto leader and brainbox of the team, capable of changing his crystalline body to any shape – which also gives him the ability to link with computers, and allowing him to reform if shattered. He can also assume a human-looking form. Despite their visible age difference he is attracted to team-mate Neon Queen.
- The Planet: Biff Baker is the team's heavy and pilot, given superhuman strength. Despite being an astronaut he is scientifically ignorant, and given to exclaiming "Goldarn it" as an expletive. He can voluntarily change his face to resemble a moon, though it is unclear what effect this has on him or anything else. While he seems to have feelings for villainess Amazonia and openly berates his brother for not knowing what a 'real woman' is, he is also attracted to Neon Queen.
- Kid Dynamo: Tommy Baker, Biff's whiz-kid younger brother who can turn into pure electricity. Despite being in a relationship with the popular Neon Queen, Kid Dynamo is hot-headed, sexist and generally obnoxious.
- Neon Queen: Jeannie Morrow can turn her body into gas. She is unpopular with the public, receiving "fan mail" saying she should resign from the group, something she genuinely considers as her femininity may make her the weak link in the team. She cleans the Mystery Mile and is largely defined by being the romantic interest for the other three-quarters of the team. Her in-universe unpopularity is mirrored in criticism in the issue's letters page

=== The Tomorrow Syndicate ===
A team of superheroes who meet in the Tomorrow Complex, a base inside Mount Rushmore.

The team are based on The Avengers.

- Horus: after Osiris' betrayal by his brother set, their sister Isis gathered the fourteen parts he had been split into and used them to bear a son, Horus. Horus divides his time between foiling Set's various plans in the land of the Gods and adventuring on Earth. While on the latter he poses as college mythology lecturer Professor Falcon, and attracts the attention of student Janet. He can switch between forms by holding his solar staff and reciting an incantation.
  - The character and his mythos are inspired by Marvel's use of Norse mythology for Journey into Mystery/The Mighty Thor, instead substituting Ancient Egyptian deities.
- The Hypernaut: after an experimental jet he was piloting suffers engine failure, pilot Dave Stevens is snatched to safety by a flying saucer, where unseen aliens transferred his brain to a cybernetic body as one of the Hypernauts, a universe-wide group of those saved from their point of death. He inhabits the Penrose triangle-shaped Hyperbase behind Earth's moon, where he constantly narrates his actions to fused pink monkey Queep.
  - The character seems based on the Silver Age Green Lantern, Hal Jordan and Iron Man.
- Infragirl: partner of Inframan, who uses the same powers. Infragirl does little other than swoon over the attractiveness of her various team-mates.
  - The character is based on the Wasp.
- Inframan: a scientist hero who uses a size regulator to change the size of himself and others.
  - The character is based on Ant-Man.
- N-Man: Doctor Will Chambers experimented on himself to make a human form resistant to radiation, making himself indestructible and irritable. He carries out missions for Colonel Powers and is deeply patriotic, hating Communists as well as Mystery Incorporated and the Hypernaut.
  - The character is based on the Hulk.
- U.S.A.: Ultimate Secret Agent works for the American government. During World War II he was exposed to Vitamin Omega, which combined with his rare blood type to give him super-strength and agility. While World War II is over he remains an active hero due to his slowed aging, working for L.A.S.E.R. he fervently hates Communists, and is lusted after by the First Lady.
  - The character is modelled on Captain America. During World War II he fought in the Victory Vanguard.

== Ownership ==
According to Bissette, during negotiations he was the owner of N-Man, the Fury, the Hypernaut and Commander Solo & Her Screamin' Skydogs. He used them as the core of his own 'Naut Universe'.

== Reception ==
Reception to 1963 has been mixed, though the series was nominated for Best Continuing/Limited Series at the 1994 Harvey Awards, losing out to Marvels. Covering the series as part of his review of Moore's career output for Tor.com, Tim Callahan was unimpressed by 1963, feeling it was one of the writer's weakest projects, feeling the nature of the pastiche was overplayed, especially as there was no payoff due to the lack of a conclusion, noting "even with different names and characters and specific Marvel-homage gags, they are just too much." Cody White of Comic Watch had similar feelings, though he felt that Image being able to hire Moore in the first place was a major landmark in the publisher's history. In an essay printed in Alan Moore – Portrait of an Extraordinary Gentlemen, Darko Macan felt the story was stupid without being "stupid enough". Rohith C of Medium was more positive about the first issue, praising the affectionate parody of Lee/Kirby-era Fantastic Four.
