= Richard Horie =

American comic book artist

- Areas: Writer, penciller, inker and colorist

Richard Horie is an American comics creator who has worked on many titles, mostly as a penciller and colorist, but also as writer and inker.

== Biography ==
Richard Horie has worked in almost every field as a comics creator, from writer and penciller to inker and colorist, the latter of which he (with wife Tanya) is perhaps now best known. Richard, according to The Best author Heidi MacDonald once worked for Disney in some capacity, but his first known comics credits appear in the mid-1990s for Image Comics. In October 1992, he wrote and pencilled part of Brigade #2, alongside writers Hank Kanalz and Eric Stephenson, writer/artist Rob Liefeld and penciller Marat Mychaels. He penciled and inked for Stephenson several times over the next year, on titles including Supreme, various Youngblood titles, Brigade, Bloodstrike and Deathmate. He provided inks for an issue of Jim Valentino's ShadowHawk, and was one of several writers and artists to contribute to the "Extreme" preview created for Hero Illustrated magazine, touting Liefeld's Image imprint Extreme Studios. Richard's work for Extreme continued along similar lines to his earlier image work, pencilling issues of Bloodstrike, Brigade, Chapel, Prophet and Operation Knightstrike amongst others.

When Rob Liefeld split from Image Comics, many of his "Extreme" creators moved with him to work under the Maximum Press banner, and Richard Horie was one such individual. Providing pencils for Robert Napton's "Battlestar Galactica" in Maximum Press's Asylum #2 and #3, Horie was also one of many pencillers to work on Alan Moore's reinvention of Liefeld's universe, providing pencils for Supreme #44 (Maximum Press), and color (with wife Tanya) for a back-up to Supreme #54 (Awesome). The two also added color to Jeph Loeb's take on the Fighting American in the Awesome Holiday Special (1997), and inked and colored the Liefeld/Loeb Re:Gex #1.

Now focusing solely on coloring, the two colored Mike Deodato Jr.'s pencils and inks for a couple of issues of Chaos! Comics' Lady Death, as well as Coven and Jada Pinkett Smith's Menace for Awesome, before coming to work almost-exclusively for DC Comics in December, 1998.

== Coloring ==
In recent years, (from approximately November/December 1997), he and his wife Tanya have focused primarily on coloring comics together. Initially, the two worked on a handful of comics published by Rob Liefeld's Awesome Entertainment (where Richard had previously penciled/inked issues of various titles) until Christmas 1998, whereupon they moved almost-completely to coloring comics in the DC Universe. They settled mainly at DC, for whom they have coloured four-five monthly comics fairly consistently for the past 8 years. The two particularly colored long runs on DC's flagship Superman title (from #152), continuing with it when it was retitled back to Adventures of Superman (for its 'Issue #600' anniversary).

The two also provide color for a multitude of covers, mostly monthly, but also including collected editions - most notably several volumes of DC's "Showcase Presents..." series of black & white reprints, where they have provided color over the artwork of Jim Aparo, Ross Andru and others. Recently, their work can be seen throughout many titles associated with DC's 2005/2006 events Infinite Crisis and 52, and lately on the build-up to Final Crisis title Countdown to Adventure and the Vertigo series Un-men.

== Partial bibliography ==
=== Writer ===
- Brigade #2 (1992)
- Extreme Hero (1994)

=== Penciler ===
- Asylum #2-3 (1995)
- Battlestar Galactica: Journey's End #3 (1996)
- Bloodstrike #7-10, 17 (1993)
- Brigade #2, 4, 13 (1992)
- Brigade Sourcebook (1994)
- Chapel Vol. 2 #3-5, 7 (1995)
- Deathmate Red (1993)
- Extreme Hero (1994)
- Glory and Friends Lingerie Special #1 (1995)
- Operation Knightstrike #1-3 (1995)
- Prophet #8 (1995)
- Supreme: The New Adventures #44 (1996)
- Team Youngblood #12 (1993)
- X-Force/Youngblood #1 (1996)
- Youngblood #14 (1995)
- Youngblood Battlezone #1 (1993)
- Youngblood Strikefile #7, 9, 11 (1993)

=== Inker ===
- Chapel Vol. 2 #3 (1995)
- Phantom Force #2 (1993)
- Re:Gex #1 (1998) – with Tanya Horie
- ShadowHawk (1992)
- Supreme #4 (1992)
- Youngblood Strikefile #8 (1993)

=== Colorists (Richard and Tanya Horie) ===
- 52 #17 (2006)
- Action Comics #811, 852
- All Flash #1 (2007)
  - The Flash: The Fastest Man Alive #3-9, 11-13 (2006)
  - The Flash #233-237 ()
- Aquaman #50 - 60
- Ascension #15, 21(1997)
- Awesome Holiday Special #1 (1997)
- Batman #566
- Batman: Harley Quinn #1 (1999)
- Black Canary Wedding Planner #1 (2007)
- Cable #71 (1993)
- Checkmate #1-3 (2006)
- Countdown To Adventure #1, 3-7 (2007)
- The Coven #6 (1997)
- The Coven: Fantom Special #1 (1998)
- The Darkness 317-18, 25, 27, (1996)
- Fade From Blue #1-10 (2002) – cover only
- Fantastic Four: Fireworks #1-3 (1999)
- Green Lantern 80-Page Giant #2 (1998)
- Guide to the DC Universe Secret Files 2002
- Hellhole #2 (1999)
- HumanKind #1-5 (2004)
- Infinite Crisis #7 (2005)
- Ion #8-12 (2006)
- JSA #86-87
- Lady Death #6-8 ()
- Legends of the DC Universe 3-D Gallery (1998)
- Legion of Super-Heroes #12 (2005)
- Menace #1 (1998)
- Meridian #31, 37-38 (2000)
- Mystic #40 (2000)
- Neil Gaiman's Neverwhere #1-9 (2005)
- Nightwing #128-130 (1996)
- Outsiders #20 (2003)
- Rann-Thanagar War #6 (2005)
- Re:Gex #0-1 (1998)
- Ruse #20 (2001)
- Secret Origins 80-Page Giant #1 (1998)
- Superboy's Legion #1-2 (2001)
- Superman #152-168, 170-175, 177-201
  - The Adventures of Superman #600, 612-638, 640-646, 648-649
- Superman & Savage Dragon: Metropolis (1998)
- Superman 10-Cent Adventure (2003)
- Superman Returns Prequel #3 (2006)
- Superman Secret Files and Origins 2005 (2006)
- Superman vs. Darkseid: Apokolips Now! (2003)
- Superman: Emperor Joker #1 (2000)
- Superman: Lex 2000 (2001)
- Superman: The Man of Steel #120, 123-133 ()
- Supreme #54 (1997)
- Teen Titans #31, 33-44, 46-49 (2003)
- Teen Titans and Outsiders Secret Files and Origins 2005 (2005)
- The Un-Men #1-8 (2007)
- Wonder Woman #197-219, 221-226 ()
