= Judgment Day (Awesome Comics) =

Limited series comic by Alan Moore

Publication information
- Publisher: Awesome Comics
- Format: Mini-series
- Genre: Superhero
- Publication date: June 1997 – October 1997
- No. of issues: 3

Creative team
- Written by: Alan Moore
- Artist(s): Rob Liefeld; Gil Kane
- Penciller(s): Keith Giffen; Gil Kane; Rob Liefeld; Stephen Platt

Collected editions
- Judgment Day: ISBN 0-9741664-5-6

Judgment Day was a limited series published by Awesome Comics from June to October 1997 written by Alan Moore and illustrated by Rob Liefeld, with additional art by Gil Kane. This story features several characters created by Liefeld for both Awesome Comics and the Image Universe, including Supreme, Youngblood and Glory, dealing with the concept of superheroes being tried for murder. The series also features characters created by other Image Comics creators such as Erik Larsen's Savage Dragon.

== Publication ==
The limited series comprised Judgment Day Alpha (#1), Judgment Day Omega (#2), Final Judgment (#3) and Aftermath.

The story deals with one member of the superpowered team Youngblood found murdered and the subsequent trial of one of her teammates for the crime. Mark Thompson of Checker Publishing Group perceives Judgment Day in an introduction for the trade paperback as a spiritual followup to Moore's earlier work Watchmen for DC Comics, in that "if superheroes can commit murder, they can certainly be charged for the crime. And that raises the question: what happens during the trial?". The main narrative is accompanied by short interludes featuring various characters throughout the history of the Awesome Comics universe, most of which act as analogues for famous literary characters (Sir Edward Conqueror for George Edward Challenger, Bram the Bezerk for Conan the Barbarian, Zantar for Tarzan, etc.). Moore would fully utilize the concept of a shared universe of literary characters in The League of Extraordinary Gentlemen with Kevin O'Neill and elements of his treatment of Glory were carried over into his America's Best Comics series Promethea. The series includes satire on the darkening of the superhero comics industry in the late 1980s to early 1990s, with allusions to Frank Miller's The Dark Knight Returns. Like his work on Supreme, Alan Moore used Judgment Day to reject the violent, deconstructive clichés of 1990s comics inadvertently caused by his own work on Watchmen, Batman: The Killing Joke and Saga of the Swamp Thing and uphold the values of classic superhero comics.

The series deals with a metacommentary of the notion of retcons to super-hero histories as Alan Moore himself creates a new backstory for the characters of Awesome Comics, to replace the shared universe they had before Rob Liefeld left Image several years earlier.

== Plot ==
In 1997, Mick Tombs/Knightsabre returns to Youngblood H.Q., drunk and depressed. He intends to make sexual propositions to Leeana Creel/Riptide at her quarters, but passes out. The next morning, members of Youngblood find Riptide's body, beaten to death in her room, and Knightsabre appears to be the only logical suspect, though he has no memory of it and swears he is innocent. Afraid of media scrutiny over Riptide's suspected murder, Shaft, Badrock and Vogue consult Savage Dragon and Supreme for help, and are told that Knightsabre's trial will take place on Supreme's floating citadel. Toby King is hired as defense for Knightsabre.

During the lengthy trial, after analyzing the memory banks of cybernetic Youngblood member Diehard, King proposes that a mythical book, which Riptide possessed months before her death, was responsible for the events, piecing together many statements about the lengthy history of the book, which was created by Hermes, the god associated with language, who gave it to Glory's mother, who subsequently buried it in Earth during its creation. The book alters reality when somebody writes upon it, and it has been acquired by many powerful figures over centuries, including the creature who would become Youngblood's Troll and Puritan immortal serial killer Deliverance Drue. Drue was defeated when Wild West-era superhero Kid Thunder literally crossed Drue out of existence. During a recess, Mr. Graves, administrator for Youngblood, reveals that Knightsabre is his son and that he is disbanding Youngblood due to the media circulation regarding the trial.

King reveals in the trial that Leanna Creel was the daughter of 1950s superhero Storybook Smith (a descendant of Deliverance Drue) who used the magic book to great lengths to fight crime and gain fame, before the book's robbery and Smith's disappearance. One of Supreme's robot clones enters the trial, having found the book in the home of Marcus Langston/Sentinel, the founder and leader of Team Youngblood. The book eventually came into the hands of Langston after its theft from Storybook Smith, and Langston used it to refashion his life so he became Sentinel and superheroes subsequently became more violent and morally questionable. Prior to her death, Riptide recognized the book and stole it from Sentinel during a Youngblood barbecue at his home. Sentinel deduced that Riptide had stolen it and went to her quarters to retrieve it, killing her during a fight and manipulating the evidence to make Knightsabre look guilty.

When this is revealed to the court, Sentinel reacts violently, attempting to retrieve the book, but it falls off the citadel and is lost. Sentinel is imprisoned for murdering Riptide. He also turns out to be a descendant of Kid Thunder, whose kin Deliverance Drue swore a curse against before his defeat. As Youngblood disbands, the Allied Supermen of America (an analogue for the Justice League) are inspired by the event to reform, as the magical book finds itself in the hands of a homeless young woman.

== Collected editions ==
The limited series was later collected as a trade paperback by Checker Book Publishing Group in 2003 (150 pages, ISBN 0-9741664-5-6).
