= Hank Kanalz =

American comic book writer and editor

Hank Kanalz (/kəˈnælz/) is an American comic book writer and editor. He was Senior Vice President of Vertigo and Integrated Publishing at DC Comics, and was formerly General Manager of the WildStorm brand for DC Comics. He also serves as Head of Publishing for Immortal Studios, a content provider that specializes in comics and more in the wuxia genre (martial arts, fantasy).

== Biography ==
Through the late 1980s and 1990s, Kanalz wrote various comics for publishers such DC Comics, and especially Malibu Comics. He designed the "i" logo for Image Comics (one of the few intellectual properties of the company), and contributed dialogue and lettering for the first issue of Image's first published comic, Rob Liefeld's Youngblood.

Prior to joining WildStorm in 2004, he held the position of Director of Worldwide Theme Park Licensing for Warner Bros.

He edited the World of Warcraft comic book as well as co-editing the Fringe comic with Ben Abernathy. As General Manager for WildStorm, he was responsible for the timely scheduled publication of books.

== Bibliography ==
- The Flash #19: "Blood Ties" (Bonus Book with pencils by Bill Knapp and inks by Jerry Acerno, DC Comics, December 1988)
- Youngblood Vol. 1 #1 (with co-author and artist Rob Liefeld, Image Comics, April 1992)
- Brigade Vol. 1 #1–2 (with co-authors, Rob Liefeld, Eric Stephenson and Richard Horie, Image Comics, August–October 1992)
- Ex-Mutants #4–10 (with pencils by Paul Pelletier and inks by Ken Branch, Malibu Comics, 1993)
- Siren (with pencils by Kevin J. West and inks by Bob Almond, 4-issue mini-series, Malibu Comics, 1995)
- Eliminator (with co-author Roland Mann and pencils by Mike Zeck, 4-issue mini-series, Malibu Comics, 1995)
- Ultraforce #7–10 (with co-author Chris Ulm, pencils by Steve Erwin and George Pérez and inks by John Stangeland, Malibu Comics, 1995)
- Green Lantern 80-Page Giant #2: "Anything You Can Do..." (with pencils by Kevin J West, DC Comics, June 1999)
