= Eric Stephenson (publisher) =

American comic book publisher (born 1968)

- Born: January 8, 1968 (age 58) Louisville, Kentucky, U.S.
- Areas: Writer, Editor, Publisher
- Notable works: Publisher, Image Comics; Nowhere Men

Eric Stephenson (born January 8, 1968) is an American comic book publisher, editor, and writer. He is the publisher of Image Comics, where he has also co-created and written comics such as Long Hot Summer, Nowhere Men, and They're Not Like Us.

== Career ==
Stephenson was involved with Image Comics during its formative years, having learned about plans for the new company from co-founder Jim Valentino months before it was announced. In the 1990s, he was the editor for Rob Liefeld's Extreme Studios and writer or co-writer for significant runs of Bloodstrike, Brigade, New Men, Supreme, Team Youngblood, and Youngblood. With Rob Liefeld, he co-created Psilence.

Between 1999 and 2000, Stephenson wrote Spider-Man Unlimited and Webspinners: Tales of Spider-Man, and co-wrote several issues of Wolverine first with Erik Larsen and then later with Rob Leifeld for Marvel Comics. From 2001 to 2002, he co-wrote and colored Fantastic Four: The World's Greatest Comics Magazine.

Stephenson worked with Valentino and Larsen during their tenures as Publisher of Image Comics, first as Director of Sales & Marketing and then later as the company's Executive Director. He also developed and edited two Image anthologies, Four-Letter Worlds (2005) and Put the Book Back on the Shelf: A Belle & Sebastian Anthology (2006).

In 2008, Stephenson was promoted to the position of Publisher of Image Comics, replacing Larsen. During this period he oversaw the expansion of Image's line to include titles such as Bitch Planet, East of West, Monstress, Saga, and The Wicked + The Divine. It was also at this time that he began writing Nowhere Men and They're Not Like Us. In 2014, Nowhere Men received four Eisner Award nominations, including Best Continuing Series, Best Writer, Best Penciller/Inker or Penciller/Inker Team, and Best Colorist.

The Beat: The News Blog of Comics Culture named Stephenson the Comics Industry Person of the Year in 2012, and Stephenson won the ComicsPRO Industry Appreciation Award in 2014.

In 2018, Image added Stephenson to its board of directors, naming him as the company's Chief Creative Officer.
