= Dial H =

DC Comics series launched in 2012

Publication information
- Publisher: DC Comics
- Schedule: Monthly
- Format: Ongoing series
- Genre: Superhero
- Publication date: May 2012 – August 2013
- No. of issues: 16 (#1–15 plus issue numbered #0)
- Main character(s): Nelson Jent; Manteau

Creative team
- Created by: China Miéville & Mateus Santolouco
- Written by: China Miéville
- Penciller(s): Mateus Santolouco (#0-5); David Lapham (#6-7); Alberto Ponticelli (#8-16)
- Inker(s): Mateus Santolouco (#0-5); David Lapham (#6-7); Dan Green (#8-16)
- Letterer(s): Steve Wands (#0-9); Taylor Esposito (#10-16)
- Colorist(s): Richard Horie & Tanya Horie (#0-16); Allen Passalaqua (#12)

Dial H is a DC Comics superhero title launched in 2012 as part of the second wave of The New 52. It is a contemporary, frequently humorous take on the Silver Age title Dial H for Hero. It was written by novelist China Miéville, featuring artwork primarily by Mateus Santolouco and Alberto Ponticelli with Brian Bolland as the cover artist.

== Premise ==
The comic tells of an out-of-shape man named Nelson Jent discovering that dialing H-E-R-O at a mysterious phone booth will transform him into unique, though short-lived, superheroes. Each time creates a new persona with a new set of powers, eventually returning him to his normal self.

DC Comics cancelled the title, concluding with issue #15 in August 2013. An epilogue issue titled Justice League #23.3 Dial E was released as part of Villains Month initiative.

== Collected editions ==
- Dial H Vol. 1: Into You (Dial H #0-6)
- Dial H Vol. 2: Exchange (Dial H #7-15, Justice League #23.3)
- Dial H: The Deluxe Edition (Dial H #0-15, Justice League #23.3) ISBN 978-1-4012-5520-6
