= Shaft (Image Comics) =

Comic book superhero

- Shaft

Publication information
- Publisher: Image Comics
- First appearance: Youngblood #1 (April 1992)
- Created by: Rob Liefeld

In-story information
- Alter ego: Jeff Terrel
- Team affiliations: Youngblood
- Abilities: Expert in swordsmanship and marksmanship

Shaft (Jeff Terrel) is a superhero created by writer/artist Rob Liefeld. Liefeld created the character for his Extreme Studios as the leader of superhero team Youngblood.

== Fictional character biography ==
Jeff Terrel is an undercover FBI agent dating an assistant district attorney when a sniper tries to kill him at a shopping mall. He slays his attacker with a thrown pen. Later, he is approached by the government-sponsored team, Youngblood. He joins the team being an already accomplished archer. He adopts the name of Shaft and began the first of many adventures with the group. His first adventure involves the removal of Middle Eastern dictator Hussain Kussein. Part of Youngblood is concerned with public relations, as seen with the media relations expert Tymer in issue three. In the same issue, he leads a holding action against a prison break.

When then-leader Battlestone was accused of misleading the team and held responsible for the deaths of many members, Shaft went on to lead the team while Battlestone founded and became the leader of Brigade. One of his earliest actions was rescuing Dan Quayle from the WildC.A.T.s. Or so he thought. This had been part of a shape-shifting Daemonite plot. Shaft also made an appearance in the Alan Moore-written "Judgement Day" limited series printed by Liefeld's second comic book publishing company Awesome Comics. In it, he played a part in the trial of fellow Youngblood teammate Knightsabre. Outside of Youngblood, he was featured in a crossover with the Valiant Comics heroes, notably Bloodshot. Shaft and his team try to bring in California-based super-squad 'The Pact' for questioning in a legal matter.

Shaft has a prominent cameo in the Shattered Image limited series, attempting to help keep the Earth from splintering off into six different versions.

When Shaft's teammate Riptide is found murdered and fellow hero Knightsabre is suspected, Shaft leads the political and legal chaos that follows, as such as a situation is unique for society at that time.

=== Present ===
Shaft once again led Youngblood in the Image Comics-published Youngblood series written by Joe Casey. This team was a public relations front put forth by the U.S. government. He is teamed with Badrock, Cougar, Doc Rocket, Diehard, and Johnny Panic. Each member of the team has their own action figure line; they also star in the in-universe Youngblood animated series.

Shaft is featured in the Image United crossover that took place in November 2009.
