= John Totleben =

American illustrator] (born 1958)

- Born: John Thomas Totleben; February 16, 1958 (age 68) Erie, Pennsylvania, U.S.
- Areas: Penciller, Inker
- Notable works: Miracleman; Swamp Thing; 1963
- Awards: Inkpot Award 2004; Inkwell Awards 2024 SASRA

John Thomas Totleben (born February 16, 1958) is an American illustrator working mostly in comic books.

== Biography ==
After studying art at Tech Memorial in Erie, Totleben attended The Kubert School for one year. He then spent several years working for comics editor Harry "A" Chesler, producing illustrations for the Rubaiyat of Omar Khayyam; which never saw print. His first published work appeared in Heavy Metal in January 1979.

His first success in American comics, and still his best-known work, was as the inker of pencilled art by Stephen R. Bissette for the DC Comics title The Saga of The Swamp Thing, when the series was being written and reinvented by Alan Moore. Totleben and Bissette joined the series in 1983 shortly before Moore. Totleben's style was unusual for the time, and is still distinctive among U.S. comics artists, for its fluid layouts and heavily detailed rendering using a combination of stippling and hatching. He also painted covers for the series in oils and acrylic. Totleben inked the story in Swamp Thing #37 (June 1985) which introduced the John Constantine character.

Beginning in 1988, Bissette and Totleben co-created and edited the horror anthology Taboo. It showcased a wide range of writers and artists, from mainstream to semi-underground, and is best known as the original venue for the acclaimed graphic novel From Hell.

Totleben's most ambitious comics project was with Moore again, on the third volume of Miracleman, which he pencilled and inked. Response to his art was so strong that Eclipse Comics retained him as the series' sole artist after changing artists several times in the previous volume despite delays caused by his newly diagnosed eye disease, retinitis pigmentosa. Totleben's art was praised as "one of the premier exemplars of the entire superhero genre."

Though Totleben's eye condition has made him legally blind, it has left his central vision clear enough for him to continue working in his usual style, but much more slowly. He has illustrated a number of titles for DC and Marvel Comics, and worked on Moore's satirical Image Comics series 1963, in which he was described as "'Jaunty' John", the blind "inker without fear".

== Awards and nominations ==
- 1985: Won Kirby Awards for "Best Art Team" (with Bissette), "Best Single Issue" (for Swamp Thing Annual #2), "Best Cover" (for Swamp Thing #34)
- 1985–1987: Won Kirby Award for Best Continuing Series (for Swamp Thing)
- 1986–1987: Nominated for Kirby Award for "Best Art Team" (with Bissette)
- 1986: Nominated for "Favourite Artist (inker)" Eagle Award
- 2004: Won Inkpot Award
- 2024: Won Inkwell Awards Stacey Aragon Special Recognition Award (SASRA)

== Bibliography ==
=== DC Comics ===
- Green Lantern/Superman: Legend of the Green Flame #1 (2001)
- History of the DC Universe HC (one page) (1988)
- The Saga of the Swamp Thing #10, 16–17, 19–27, 29, 31, 34–38 (1983–1985)
- Swamp Thing vol. 2 #39–40, 42, 44, 46, 48, 50, 53, 55, 60, Annual #2 (1985–1987)
- Who's Who: The Definitive Directory of the DC Universe #1 (Arcane and Arkham Asylum entries), #22 (Swamp Thing entry) (1985–1986)

==== America's Best Comics ====
- America's Best Comics Special #1 (2001)

==== Helix ====
- Vermillion #8, 12 (1997)

==== Vertigo ====
- The Books of Magic Annual #3 (1999)
- The Dreaming #33, 50 (1999–2000)
- Neil Gaiman's Midnight Days TPB (2000)
- Strange Adventures vol. 2 #3 (2000)
- The Vertigo Gallery: Dreams and Nightmares #1 (1995)

=== Eclipse Comics ===
- Miracleman #11–16 (1987–1989)
- Real War Stories #1 (1987)
- Scout #10 (one page) (1986)

=== First Comics ===
- Grimjack #14 (1985)

=== HM Communications, Inc. ===
- Heavy Metal v2#9, v5#6 (1979 and 1981)

=== Image Comics ===
- 1963 #4–5 (1993)

=== Kitchen Sink Press ===
- 50's Funnies #1 (1980)

=== Marvel Comics ===
- Bizarre Adventures #33 (1982)
- Epic Illustrated #33 (1985)
- Savage Sword of Conan #80 (one page) (1982)
- Timespirits #4 (1985)
- Ultimate Marvel Team-Up #10 (2002)
- Universe X: Cap #1 (2001)
- X-Men Unlimited #36 (2002)

=== Pacific Comics ===
- Twisted Tales #6 (1984)

=== Spiderbaby Grafix & Publications ===
- Taboo #2, 4 (1989–1990)

Preceded by Scott Hampton	The Saga of the Swamp Thing / Swamp Thing inker 1983–1986	Succeeded by Alfredo Alcala
Preceded by Rick Veitch	Miracleman artist 1987–1989	Succeeded by Mark Buckingham
