= Four Letter Worlds =

2005 American comic anthology

- Date: 2005
- Publisher: Image Comics
- ISBN: 1-58240-439-9

Four Letter Worlds is a comics anthology published by American company Image Comics in 2005; it tells 16 stories revolving around four lettered words: Love, Hate, Fear, and Fate.

Organized by Image Comics' Executive Director Eric Stephenson, contributors to the book include Amber Benson, R'John Bernales, Joe Casey, Chynna Clugston, Kieron Dwyer, Jay Faerber, Matt Fraction, Steven Griffin, Mike Hawthorne, Phil Hester, Mike Huddleston, Antony Johnston, Robert Kirkman, Steve Lieber, Jim Mahfood, Jamie McKelvie, B. Clay Moore, Scott Morse, Mike Norton, Jeff Parker, Jamie S. Rich, Mark Ricketts, Matt Roberts, Steve Rolston, Eric Stephenson, J. Torres & Andi Watson.
