= Nowhere Men =

Comic book series

- The first issue's cover artwork, done by Nate Bellegarde and Fonografiks.

Publication information
- Publisher: Image Comics
- Genre: Drama; Mystery; Science fiction
- Publication date: November 2012
- Main character(s): Dade Ellis, Emerson Strange, Simon Grimshaw, and Thomas Walker

Creative team
- Created by: Eric Stephenson, Nate Bellegarde
- Written by: Eric Stephenson
- Penciller(s): Nate Bellegarde (#1-6); Dave Taylor (#7-onward); Emi Lenox (#7-onward); Fonografiks
- Inker(s): Nate Bellegarde (#1-6); Dave Taylor (#7-onward)
- Colorist: Jordie Bellaire

Nowhere Men is a comic book series written by Eric Stephenson. The first six issues were drawn by Nate Bellegarde, colored by Jordie Bellaire, lettered by Fonografix (Steven Finch), and published by Image Comics. As of issue 7, Dave Taylor has replaced Nate Bellegarde, who no longer is part of the creative team. Emi Lenox also joined up, providing short comics about Monica Strange, one of the characters of Nowhere Men.

The series centers on a fictional world where a group of four scientists, long since gone their own ways, have had huge cultural influences in a way similar to that of The Beatles in our world. It is loosely based on the story of the British Invasion, especially how The Beatles stood out. The promotional tagline, "Science is the new Rock-N-Roll", exemplifies this.

The name is derived primarily from the fact that things just seem to come out of nowhere for the scientists, although there are other plot points that the name is based on as well. It was also influenced by the Beatles song "Nowhere Man".

Nowhere Men was nominated for four Eisner Awards in 2014, of which it won one: Jordie Bellaire won the award for Best Colorist for her work on several titles, including Nowhere Men.

As of May 2021, eleven issues have been published, the first six of which form the completed first arc. The seventh through eleventh issues are part of the second arc, which started in January 2016 after a two-year delay.

== Publication history ==
=== Arc 1 ===
The first arc of Nowhere Men consists of six issues, published between November 2012 and October 2013 and collected in November 2013 in a collected edition with the title Nowhere Men, Vol. 1: Fates Worse Than Death TP.

=== Arc 2 ===
The second arc was originally scheduled to start with the release of issue 7 in January 2014, but this release did not happen. Around the same time, Image Comics pulled the webpages on issues 7, 8 and 9, which resulted in speculation on the series' possible cancellation.

In May 2014, a tweet by Image Comics confirmed the series was still being worked on. Nate Bellegarde attributed the delays in Nowhere Men to himself in a long Google Docs document he posted on his Tumblr in July 2014. While it did not give a predicted date of publishing, it confirmed that the series was still being worked on.

On November 2, 2015, Image Comics announced the return of Nowhere Men. David Taylor replaced Nate Bellegarde. Jordie Bellaire and Fonografiks continued working on the series alongside Stephenson. Emi Lenox provides small comics about the Nowhere Men character Monica Strange.

Issue 7 was released on January 20, 2016, starting the second story arc which is incomplete as of May 2021.

== Cast ==
- Dade Ellis, a neuroscientist and co-founder of World Corp.
- Simon Grimshaw, a geneticist and co-founder of World Corp.
- Emerson Strange, an inventor, designer and co-founder of World Corp.
- Thomas Walker, a theoretical physicist and co-founder of World Corp.
- Daniel Pierce, a quantum physicist, astronomer and engineer, employed by the World Corp. Test Division and assigned to the ISS
- Adra Madan, a chemist, nutritionist, botanist and biologist, employed by the World Corp. Test Division and assigned to the ISS
- Kurt McManus, a medical doctor and biologist, employed by the World Corp. Test Division and assigned to the ISS
- Jackson Peake, the ISS systems officer and an EVA, employed by the World Corp. Test Division
- Susan Queen, a medical doctor and immunologist, employed by the World Corp. Test Division and assigned to the ISS
- Karen Reynolds, a chemist and biologist, employed by the World Corp. Test Division and assigned to the ISS
- Holly Jameson, a nuclear physicist, astronomer and engineer, employed by the World Corp. Test Division and assigned to the ISS
- Albert Langley, the ISS section chief and an EVA, employed by the World Corp. Test Division
- David Burnett, an engineer and roboticist, employed by the World Corp. Test Division and assigned to the ISS
- Brian Robeson, an engineer and roboticist, employed by the World Corp. Test Division and assigned to the ISS
- Nicholas Hewitt, the ISS communications officer employed by the World Corp. Test Division
- Peter Wilson, the ISS life systems officer and an EVA, employed by the World Corp. Test Division
- Monica Strange, Emerson Strange's daughter

== Story ==
Nowhere Men centers on four scientists—Dade Ellis, Emerson Strange, Simon Grimshaw, and Thomas Walker—whose work leads to science becoming as culturally important as rock music. Together, the four form World Corp., a research and development firm that becomes the most influential business in the entire world; but their differences, including a dispute over how to handle a secret experiment gone wrong, drive them apart. According to Stephenson, inspiration was drawn not just from The Beatles, but also from the story of Apple and their war with Microsoft and how he thought the leaders of the two rivals would work if they were teammates.

Sometime after the scientists leave, World Corp. workers aboard the International Space Station begin suffering from a virus that affects each of them differently. Due to the secrecy of the mission, only some higher-ups in World Corp. know that the workers are there, and are unwilling to bring them back to Earth. The crew is left to themselves trying desperately to find a way to get back home.

== Awards ==
Nowhere Men was nominated for four Eisner Awards in 2014, of which it won one:

- Best Continuing Series: Nominee
- Best Writer (Eric Stephenson): Nominee
- Best Penciller/Inker (Nate Bellegarde): Nominee
- Best Coloring (Jordie Bellaire): Winner (Note: The award was granted for Bellaire's work on multiple titles, including Nowhere Men.)
