= Hyperwerks =

American comic book publisher

Hyperwerks Entertainment LLC
- Company type: Private
- Industry: Comic books, graphic novels
- Founded: 1997
- Defunct: 2024
- Headquarters: Los Angeles, California, United States
- Key people: Karl Altstaetter, Lead Illustrator; Robert Napton, Head Writer; Jamie Douraghy, producer
- Parent: None
- Website: www.hyperwerks.com

Hyperwerks Entertainment LLC was an American company that published comic books. It was founded by Karl Altstaetter and Jamie Douraghy in 1997. Projects from Hyperwerks include the Deity and Rostam series.

Hyperwerks was disestablished in 2024.

== History ==
Since its inception, Hyperwerks has created a three-part Deity mini-series: Original Series, Darkness & Light and Revelations which was published under the Image Comics banner. Additional titles from the Altstaetter/Napton creative team are two Deity spin-offs: Catseye and Kosmic Kat as well as the fantasy genre mini-series Saint Angel.

Additionally, artist and writer Steve Buccellato created the Weasel Guy Witchblade crossover as well as the black and white comic Weasel Guy: Road Trip.

Hyperwerks product line includes the Requiem: The Deity/Catseye three-issue mini-series.

Film Roman, the animation studio behind The Simpsons and King of the Hill optioned the rights to Deity with the intent of developing the comic book into an animated primetime television series marketed to a young, hip audience.

== See also ==
- Awesome-Hyperwerks
