= Arcade Comics =

American independent comic book company

Arcade Comics was a short-lived independent comic book company founded by former Image Comics mainstay Rob Liefeld and Jimmy Jay of Jay Company Comics in 2002. The company also intended to acquire the rights to the TV show Alias, but it was never materialized. This is Liefeld's fourth publishing label after Extreme Studios, Maximum Press and Awesome Comics.

The company kicked off in 2003 with its first comic Youngblood: Genesis which was released at San Diego Comic-Con in 2003. This convention release would mark the start of Arcade's plan to release books on the convention circuit first. Nitrogen #1 (2006) was Arcade's last publication.

== Books published ==
- Arcade Convention Special: Nitrogen/The Cross Special (Wizard World LA Con Exclusive)
- NitroGen #1
- NitroGen: Extreme Forces #1
- Supreme Sacrifice: Suprema #1
- Youngblood: Genesis #1–2
- Youngblood: Bloodsport #1
- Youngblood: Imperial #1
- Youngblood: Maximum Edition (TPB)
