= Ian Churchill =

British comic book artist (born 1969)

- Born: 1969 (age 56–57)
- Areas: Penciller, Inker
- Notable works: Cable; Deadpool; Supergirl (vol. 5)

Ian Churchill (born 1969) is a British comic book artist, who has mostly worked in the American comic book industry.

== Career ==
Churchill's early work included stints on Supergirl, Uncanny X-Men as well as the Deadpool: Sins of the Past limited series, in addition to a lengthy stay on Cable, the latter gaining him (along with writer Jeph Loeb) fan acclaim. Loeb and Churchill were to later team up to produce Coven and Lionheart for Awesome Comics.

He was the initial artist for the most recent spin-off of the Teen Titans comic series, Titans, (vol. 2) which features the New Teen Titans of the Marv Wolfman/George Pérez era.

In 2009 Churchill drew the "Code Red" story arc in Hulk, which introduced the Red She-Hulk. The title, inked by Mark Farmer, saw a change in his usual drawing style, the result of a shoulder injury which required surgery.

In December 2010, Churchill's creator-owned comic "Marineman" launched to critical acclaim, securing an Eisner nomination for best new series 2010. The collected trade paperback of volume 1, "Marineman: A Matter of Life and Depth", was published in 2011. Churchill begins work on volume 2 of Marineman in 2013. Marineman, which Churchill writes and pencils and does the final colours, is published through Image Comics.

On April 9, 2011, Churchill was one of 62 comics creators who appeared at the IGN stage at the Kapow! convention in London to set two Guinness World Records, the Fastest Production of a Comic Book, and Most Contributors to a Comic Book. With Guinness officials on hand to monitor their progress, writer Mark Millar began work at 9am scripting a 20-page black and white Superior comic book, with Churchill and the other artists appearing on stage throughout the day to work on the pencils, inks, and lettering, including Dave Gibbons, Frank Quitely, John Romita Jr., Jock, Doug Braithwaite, Olivier Coipel, Duncan Fegredo, Simon Furman, David Lafuente, John McCrea, Sean Phillips and Liam Sharp, who all drew a panel each, with regular Superior artist Leinil Yu creating the book's front cover. The book was completed in 11 hours, 19 minutes, and 38 seconds, and was published through Icon on November 23, 2011, with all royalties being donated to Yorkhill Children's Foundation.

In 2012 Churchill was the artist on The Ravagers series for DC and also mentored the wildly popular Image Comics title No Place Like Home. Volume 1 of Marineman was published in hardback format in French.

Beginning in 2014, Churchill is working with Jonathan Ross on a new title for Image Comics called The Revenge.

== Bibliography ==
Comics work (interior pencil) art includes:

=== Awesome ===
- Coven #1-6
- Coven, vol. 2, #1-3
- Coven Black & White
- Coven: Fantom
- Lionheart, miniseries, #1-2 (1999)
- Supreme: The Return #5 (2000)

=== DC ===
- Adventures of Superman #639 (2005)
- Action Comics #826, 836 (among other artists) (2005–06); #977 (2017)
- All-Flash #1 (among other artists) (2007)
- DCU Holiday Special (Aquaman) #1 (2009)
- Justice League, vol. 3, #24 (2017)
- Justice League of America, vol. 2, #25 (among other artists) (2008)
- The Ravagers #0-7 (2012)
- Superman, vol. 2, #165 (among other artists), 176, 180, 216 (2001–05)
- Superman/Batman #19 (full art); #26, 50 (among other artists) (2005–08)
- Supergirl, vol. 5, #0-5, 7, 9, 10, 13-15 (2005–07)
- Teen Titans, vol. 5, #12, 15, 17-20, 22, 24 (2015–16)
- Titans East Special (2008)
- Titans #1 (2008)
- Wonder Woman, vol. 4, #43 (2015)

=== Image ===
- Marineman #1-6 (2010-2011)
- "Marineman: A Matter of Life and Depth" (2011)
- No Place Like Home (variant cover only) #1 (2012)
- "Revenge" #1-4 (2014)

=== Marvel ===
- Avengers, vol. 2, #4-5, Annual 2001 (among other artists); #6-7 (full art) (1997)
- Cable #3 (among other artists); #20, 22-23, 25, 27, 29-35, 37-39 (1993–97)
- Captain America, vol. 2, #6 (along with Rob Liefeld) (1997)
- Deadpool, miniseries, #1-4 (1994)
- Excalibur #74 (1994)
- Hulk, vol. 3, #14-17 (2009)
- Uncanny X-Men #394-396, Annual #18 (1994-2001)
- Wolverine #80, 156-157 (1994-2000)
- X-Men, vol. 2, Annual #2 (1993)
- X-Men: The Wedding Album (1994)
- X-Men Chronicles #2 (1995)
