= Troll (Youngblood) =

Fictional character

Bartholemew J. Troll is a fictional character, heavily influenced by Wolverine, created by Rob Liefeld.

== Publication history ==
Troll first appeared in Image Zero #0 (October 1993). He then appeared in Youngblood (1994) as a member of the superhero team.

== Fictional character biography ==
Troll was born a member of his race of the same name. Though he appears with grey hair and the rest of his body hairless, his true appearance is, in fact, a short-haired blue creature. Not much information about his past has been revealed, although he once worked for the United States government during World War I. Prior to that, he came into contact with a mystical book which tells of things to come and allows the user to rewrite their own history. He lost the book in a card game and when he attempted to reclaim it, he was trapped in ice for hundreds of years. In the 1990s, he came to work for the government-sponsored superhero team Youngblood.

Troll is featured in the November 2009 Image crossover Image United.
