= Glory (character) =

Publication information
- Publisher: Image Comics
- First appearance: Youngblood Strikefile #1 (April 1993)
- Created by: Rob Liefeld

In-story information
- Alter ego: Gloriana Demeter
- Team affiliations: Allies; Brigade
- Notable aliases: Gloria West
- Abilities: Super strength flight capability teleportation through reflective surfaces

Glory is a comic book superheroine created by Rob Liefeld. She first appeared in Image Comics Youngblood Strikefile #1 (April 1993), and initially starred in books published by Liefeld's Extreme Studios, which was a partner studio of Image Comics, a publisher that Liefeld co-founded in 1992. Following Liefeld's departure from that publisher, the character went on to appear in books published by Liefeld's subsequent endeavor, Awesome Comics. A homage to Wonder Woman, Gloriana Demeter is a half-Amazonian, half-Demon warrior.

== Publication history ==
=== Rob Liefeld's version ===
Glory is the result of an alliance between the Lady Demeter of the Amazonians and the demon Lord Silverfall of the Underworld. Raised in her mother's world and trained by the Amazonians, she emerged as their finest warrior. However, she also struggles to control the savagery which is her paternal gift/curse. Not at home in either Amazonia or the Underworld, Glorianna goes to the world of man, later encountering Warrior Nun Areala.

During World War II, Glorianna fights for the Allied forces against the Nazis, alongside Supreme. For a time she works with Die-Hard and SuperPatriot as the team called 'Allies'. She is part of the second and third Brigade teams with other superheroes.

=== Alan Moore's version ===
Writer Alan Moore joined Image after leaving DC Comics and spending a period of time working for independent companies. As he did on other Liefeld works like Supreme and Youngblood, Moore relaunched Glory in March 1999 under the Awesome Comics line. Blending mythology, adventure, and romance to the superheroine much as he would shortly do in his subsequent series for ABC Comics, Promethea.

In the retooling, Glory takes on a human identity by a waitress named "Gloria West", in order to experience humanity. Only one issue was published (#0) but was eventually republished with two additional issues for Avatar Press in 2001. This version also had an extended backstory, once supervising a team called 'Danger Damsels' decades ago.

=== Joe Keatinge's version ===
In 2012, Joe Keatinge was the writer for a relaunched Glory ongoing series with artist Sophie Campbell. The series was not renumbered and began with issue #23 and lasted until issue #34. Glory's history is retooled, establishing the Amazons and Demons as extraterrestrials. Glory was also redesigned to be an albino, more muscular and covered in battle scars.
