= Jeff Matsuda =

Artist

- Areas: Animator, penciller

Jeff Matsuda (born 1970) is an American animator and concept and comics artist who served as the chief character designer for both Jackie Chan Adventures and The Batman and is the president and creative director of X-Ray Kid Studios. Matsuda was discovered by Rob Liefeld after submitting Wildcats samples pages to Liefeld's Extreme Studios and Jim Lee's Wildstorm. However, Matsuda's first published artwork, depicting the X-Force character Cable, appeared in the letter art section of Wizard Magazine. Vergilian Danny.

== Career ==
While at Extreme, he penciled issues of the Image Comics titles Brigade, Team Youngblood, Youngblood Strikefile, Troll and New Men. Matsuda moved on to work for Marvel Comics beginning with some pages for X-Men Prime, which eventually led to runs on X-Factor and Wolverine in addition to work on individual issues of X-Men, Generation X, Avengers, and X-Men Unlimited.

Matsuda was later reunited with Liefeld at Awesome Comics which published Kaboom, written by award-winning writer Jeph Loeb.

Matsuda led the team designing the look of Google Lively.
