= Badrock =

- Badrock

Publication information
- Publisher: Image Comics
- First appearance: Youngblood #1 (April 1992)
- Created by: Rob Liefeld

In-story information
- Alter ego: Thomas John McCall
- Team affiliations: Youngblood; Brigade
- Abilities: Superhuman strength, reflexes and durability Granite-like skin

Badrock (Thomas McCall) is a superhero appearing in comic books published by Image Comics. Created by Rob Liefeld, he first appeared in Youngblood #1 (April 1992). The character's name was originally "Bedrock" and his catchphrase was "Yabba-dabba DOOM", but legal pressure forced Liefeld to change the name to "Badrock" to avoid confusion with the fictional town from The Flintstones.

== Fictional character biography ==
Thomas John McCall is an average, underachieving 16-year-old when he swallows a vial of top secret genetic material in his father's lab. A transformation occurs and McCall's body becomes a mass of organic rock, similar to granite. However, he exhibits the emotional immaturity of a 16-year-old. Thomas later assumes the identity of Badrock, after being recruited to join the high-profile, government superteam Youngblood. Badrock is a part of every incarnation of the Youngblood team to date (1992, 1995, and 2008 series as well as the Team Youngblood and Youngblood Strikefile series).

Badrock is proficient with a number of weapons, which include the many guns and knives available in the Youngblood arsenal. Not one to hide behind gadgetry, however, Badrock often uses the power of his fists to pummel opponents into submission. Despite his massive size, Badrock's reflexes exceed normal human levels.

Badrock is portrayed as impulsive and dangerous. He causes property-damage by picking fights with the police officer Savage Dragon and Mighty Man. The fight with Savage Dragon is intended to reveal if Bedrock was up to joining Youngblood. Instead, Savage Dragon arrests him.

Badrock is one of the most popular members of Youngblood, in both the fictional Image Universe and real-life comic readers. Badrock stars in more spin-off comics than any other member of the team.

He starred in his own team-up book entitled Badrock and Company, which ran for six issues and paired him with other Image heroes, that were all creations of Image's other studios. These included Pitt (Full Bleed Studios), Fuji of Stormwatch (WildStorm), Mighty Man (Highbrow Entertainment), Velocity (Top Cow Productions), Grifter of the Wildcats (also from WildStorm) and Shadowhawk (Shadowline).

Badrock's adventures involve threats to national security, such as Youngblood rescuing Vice President Dan Quayle from the WildC.A.T.s. In one of his many solo adventures, Badrock visits Hell, confronting Spawn's old enemy, the Violator. This is after being named temporary security head of a scientific installation that investigates the realm of Hell. Badrock is more responsible at this point, trying to protect the many innocent people who unwittingly made the trip to Hell with him. He has to deal with the interference of heavenly and hellish agents and the unwillingness of some of the humans to obey his orders. At one point, Violator tricks Badrock into freeing him because the heavenly agent that tore into the building is willing to kill anyone and everyone. Violator uses his human form to convince the angel Celestine that Badrock is the demon. The hero is defeated, and the angel is fatally injured. She manages to keep it together until her life force returns Badrock and the innocent humans to Earth.

Around this time, and in a follow-up to the story from Badrock and Company #5, Badrock teams up with Grifter to save his mother, Angela, who is once again captured by the Covenant of the Sword. The story further explores the fact that Grifter once had an intimate relationship with Badrock's mom. Only two issues of the limited series were produced, even though the story was incomplete and promised "To Be Continued...".

=== Murder ===
Badrock is part of a vital effort of keeping reality from duplicating itself in the Shattered Image limited series. Around this time, his teammate Riptide is found murdered in her bedroom; Badrock is part of the group that takes custody of her seeming killer, Knightsabre.

When Youngblood is disbanded after the death of Riptide, Badrock takes some time off. It does not last long though, and through a series of events, he becomes part of the fourth incarnation of Brigade (although the series, published by Liefeld's company, Awesome Comics, only lasted one issue).

Badrock also joins another incarnation of Youngblood, this one based on 'Liberty Island'. He joins with Shaft, Cougar, Diehard, Doc Rocket, and Johnny Panic. During his time with the team, he is injured and must use crutches. He also confronts evil, super-powered doubles of his parents. The entire team confronts a government controlled 'super-villain' team; each member of Youngblood has a focus-tested 'rival'.

In the year 3000, Badrock is still alive and returns for a brief period of time to get some help from Youngblood to stop the Katellans. The continued attempts of the Katellans to reacquire the defector Combat lead to the destruction of Earth, Katella, and Acura in Badrock's timeline. Badrock then returns to 1995 where he prevents this from occurring. The mission succeeds.

Badrock also starred in three inter-company crossovers with Marvel Comics. Badrock and Wolverine of the X-Men join forces to battle the Savage Land Mutates. While being interviewed for the Daily Bugle, Badrock teams up with Spider-Man to take on Spidey's villains, thanks to the illusions of Mysterio. As a member of Youngblood, Badrock and his pals team up with X-Force to battle Mojo.

Badrock is also part of the 'Image United' crossover that began in November 2009.

In the series Prophet, which takes place several thousand years in the future, Badrock has grown to immense size and has become a planet. He has a number of children, including one called Brainrock who tries to become a planet as well, but only reaches the size of a tiny moon.

== See also ==
- Image Comics
- List of Image Comics publications
- Youngblood
