= Awesome Comics =

American comic book studio

- Industry: Publishing
- Genre: Superhero
- Predecessor: Extreme Studios; Maximum Press
- Founded: 1997
- Founder: Rob Liefeld (founder); Jeph Loeb (publisher)
- Defunct: 2000
- Key people: Rob Liefeld
- Products: Comics

Awesome Comics or Awesome Entertainment (also known as Awesome-Hyperwerks when briefly joined with Hyperwerks Entertainment) was an American comic book studio formed in 1997 by Rob Liefeld following his exit from Image Comics, a company he co-founded five years prior.

Awesome Comics was the successor of Extreme Studios and Maximum Press, Liefeld's imprints at Image, and was followed by his new company Arcade Comics upon its closure in 2000.

Netflix was in talks to adapt the characters for a series of films in 2018 but the deal collapsed.

== Background ==
=== Extreme Studios and Maximum Press ===
In 1992, seven high-profile comics artists left Marvel Comics to form their own publisher, where comics creators could publish creator-owned material without having to give up copyright-control to their characters. The seven artists (bar Whilce Portacio, who opted not to become a full partner) formed a partnership among their individual studios, and published their comics under the over-arcing Image Comics banner. Image's early titles were distributed by Malibu Comics (a company chosen for its good marketing and distribution practices), while Image established itself independently. The studios were: Todd McFarlane's Todd McFarlane Productions, Marc Silvestri's Top Cow Productions, Jim Lee's Wildstorm Productions, Erik Larsen's Highbrow Entertainment, Jim Valentino's ShadowLine, and Rob Liefeld's Extreme Studios.

Extreme Studios's Youngblood became the first comic released under the Image banner, and became the first independent (non-DC/Marvel) title to be a number-one best-seller since DC and Marvel became dominant. Other Extreme titles published through Image included: Badrock, Bloodstrike, Brigade, Team Youngblood, Youngblood Strikefile, Glory, Prophet, Supreme, Troll and New Men. In 1993, the company had signed a deal with Amblin Entertainment to develop content for motion pictures and television.

Titles thought not to fit with the Image brand were self-published under Liefeld's separate imprint: Maximum Press. These titles included Asylum, Avengelyne, Warchild, Law and Order, Black Flag, Risk, and even licensed properties such as the classic sci-fi TV show Battlestar Galactica (based on the original 1978–1979 TV series). After Liefeld's departure from Image in 1996, Maximum Press began publishing some of Liefeld's Extreme titles (including Glory and Supreme), before Awesome Entertainment came into being.

== History ==
After acrimonious disputes with the other founding partners (not least over allegations of irregularities surrounding Liefeld's separate imprint Maximum Press), Liefeld and Extreme Studios broke from Image Comics in 1996, and became "Awesome Comics." Shortly thereafter, Liefeld found a new publisher — writer-producer Jeph Loeb — and additional financing from both John Hyde (Film Roman CEO) and Scott Mitchell Rosenberg, newly Chairman of Platinum Studios. Platinum Studios continues to play an integral part in Liefeld's comics work. (Liefeld had previously worked with Rosenberg, the founder of Malibu Comics, Image's original distributor, which (post-Image) had been sold to Marvel, in 1994.)

Awesome Comics continued many of the popular Extreme series, as well as launching new titles, including The Coven and Lionheart by Loeb and artist Ian Churchill. Perhaps Liefeld's best move, and the one for which Awesome's output is best known, was the decision to hire acclaimed comics writer Alan Moore to breathe new life into several of Extreme/Awesome's comics and characters. Although Moore's first output for Liefeld came when Extreme was still publishing under the Image banner, the majority of his work was done under Awesome, with several issues (of Supreme) also being published by Maximum in-between the two imprints.

== Alan Moore ==
=== Supreme ===
Moore's most lauded work for Awesome Comics was for Supreme. Taking over initially with #41 (#49 was the first to bear the "Awesome" imprint), Moore deconstructed and reconstructed the core character (and his supporting cast) from a relatively generic superhero, into a glowing tribute to the Mort Weisinger-era of Superman. Featuring both comics and social commentary and both general and specific tributes to aspects of comics history, Supreme received much critical praise, with Entertainment Weekly, for example, calling a Supreme collection a "graphic novel you really oughta get your hands on".

=== Judgment Day ===
Following Supreme, Liefeld asked Moore to write a limited series crossover featuring almost the entire cast of the Awesome Comics universe, as part of a planned move for Moore to have free rein to redesign and overhaul the entire Awesome Universe. Given the title Judgment Day, Moore, according to one writer, took exception to the by-then hackneyed idea of an apocalyptic crossover, and instead "chose to frame the story around a trial, which would provide the impetus for the title. ...[A]s super-heroes testified while a member of Youngblood was tried for murder, flashback sequences would redefine the entire company's universe".

However, the overhaul faltered from the start. The three Judgment Day issues were each labeled as individual number "#1"s, and only differentiated through slightly-confusing subtitles: Alpha, Omega, and Final Judgment. In addition to the sales-boost issues labelled "#1" regularly achieve, the three issues were longer than normal though priced conventionally. However, the confusing labelling and severe publishing delays (particularly by the third issue) caused sales to falter.

In December 1997, Moore wrote a follow-up issue, the Awesome Holiday Special featuring his new Youngblood team. He followed this the next month with Judgment Day: Aftermath, featuring artwork by the renowned Gil Kane (who also appeared in the story as a character), which cleared the stage for the intended revised and revamped Awesome Universe, plotted by Moore.

=== Youngblood and Glory ===
The first title to be relaunched was Youngblood, the first Image title, and core title in Liefeld's various — and subsequent — imprints. Issue #1, written by Moore with art by Steve Skroce, was released around the same time as Judgment Day: Aftermath in early 1998. Despite Moore reportedly having the first 12 issues outlined and part-written prior to its launch, the title was delayed considerably, with the second issue not seeing print until six months after the first. The second issue also proved to be the final issue, although the title was subsequently retitled and relaunched a year later as Awesome Adventures, featuring a foreshortened story from Moore's script and notes. This followed the publication of a Glory Preview issue (#0) by Moore for a series that would not see print from Awesome. (Ultimately, and also plagued by similar delays, a couple of issues of Moore's Glory finally saw print from Avatar Press in 2001/2002.)

== Non-Moore Awesome publications ==
Awesome's initial releases also included entirely new properties which were generally received more favorably than either the Extreme or Maximum lines had been. These included Kaboom, created by artist Jeff Matsuda (and written by Loeb), which dealt with main character Geof Sunrise, who on his sixteenth birthday is given "access to the Kaboom Power Cycle, the mystic source of all power", and subsequently hunted by "the Nine, a group of demons". Artist Ian Churchill created two series—Coven and Lionheart (both also written by Loeb). Coven (which followed a fairly regular bi-monthly publishing schedule between August 1997 and July 1998 for its first 6-issue series) was a supernatural, "Heaven vs. Hell" title, featuring the titular group. "The Coven" was made up of "Fantom (half-human vampiress); Spellcaster (white witch with owl familiar); Scratch (Catholic priest possessed by a demon); Blackmass (leader, descendant of Cain); and Phenomena (can tell when trouble's a-brewing)", and featured "a healthy mix of lightheartedness and horror". Lionheart's two issues told the story of Karen Quinn, an archaeologist accidentally transformed into Lionheart, a warrior "infused with a divine power tracing back to the Garden of Eden and the expulsion of Adam and Eve."

=== Fighting American ===
Another of Awesome's bigger releases was the revival of the classic patriotic comic book character Fighting American, created by Joe Simon and Jack Kirby in 1954. Liefeld acquired the rights to this character in confusing circumstances, allegedly due in large part to a lawsuit between himself and Marvel Comics over "his" character Agent: America, which drew litigation for the characters' extreme similarities to Marvel's Captain America, which had also been created by Simon and Kirby. During the early stages of the legal action, Liefeld bought the rights to Simon and Kirby's own Captain America-esque character: Fighting American. Merging Fighting American with Agent: America managed to confuse and defuse much of the lawsuit. Despite the derivative Agent: America having seen publication before Liefeld purchased the rights to Fighting American, the ultimately melded creation managed to avoid the brunt of Marvel's suit, and both sides walked away reasonably confident of their "victory" in the case. As part of the ruling, Liefeld's Fighting American was allowed to have a shield, but not to throw it like Captain America.

== Awesome's collapse ==
Awesome eventually collapsed for a number of reasons, in which cause and effect appear muddled and linked. Its launch and success occurred towards the end of the 90s comics boom, in which speculation forced sales up artificially and unreasonably. The speculator boom was fueled in no small part by the trend for multiple variant covers — something which the artist-led Image had a hand in, and a trend which was followed to extremes by Awesome. Youngblood featured at least eleven variant covers on its debut issue (see below). Concurrently, internal disputes among its partners and the abrupt departure of its primary investor hamstrung the company, while the erratic content of some comics (sometimes not including the solicited content, featuring multiple artists, etc.) and unpredictable publishing schedule hurt sales.

=== Post-Awesome ===
==== Alan Moore ====
Moore moved on from the collapse of Awesome to almost immediately start his own America's Best Comics imprint for Jim Lee's Wildstorm (later, and controversially from Moore's perspective, sold to DC), creating and writing its entire output in much the same way he had been planning that of the Awesome Universe. Indeed, Liefeld has subsequently suggested that Moore's ABC work owed a significant amount to his work for Awesome, suggesting on Mark Millar's MillarWorld forum that:

"...much of the ABC line is made up of poorly masked Awesome characters and story outlines he prepared for us... I believe I could draw direct connections to many of the ABC characters and their origins coming from pages of Awesome work we commissioned from him. In short order, Tom Strong is Supreme mixed with his Prophet proposal. Promethea is Glory and the rest I honestly don't pay much attention to. Don't have the time or interest. Simply put, there is no ABC without Supreme and the Awesome re-launch."

==== Loeb, Churchill, Matsuda, and McGuinness ====
Jeph Loeb has continued his post-Awesome success-story with a great deal of writing for both DC and Marvel. Notably, in 2003, he and artist Jim Lee produced the year-long Batman: Hush, one of DC's biggest-selling titles. In 2004, he launched the Superman/Batman title, continuing as writer until issues #25 and #26. He has also written for the TV series Smallville, and is a writer/producer on Lost. In 2007, Loeb signed a Marvel-exclusive contract that saw him become an integral architect of the Ultimate Universe (writing Ultimates 3 and Ultimatum along with several specials) as well launching a new Hulk book with Ed McGuiness.

Loeb and Churchill were reunited for an issue of Superman/Batman, from which they spun off 2005's solo Supergirl series. Churchill returned briefly to Marvel, working on several X-Men titles in 2000/2001 (most notably a relaunch of Uncanny X-Men with writer Joe Casey running alongside Grant Morrison and Frank Quitely's more memorable New X-Men), but most of his subsequent work has been for DC, for whom he remains under an exclusive contract, which has seen him produce work for four issues of Countdown (October 2007).

Jeff Matsuda moved more towards animation and videogames and is best known now for having created the character designs for the television animations Jackie Chan Adventures (2000) and The Batman (2004), as well as working on 2007's animated Teenage Mutant Ninja Turtles film: TMNT.

Ed McGuinness has produced a considerable amount of work for DC, most notably on their flagship Superman title, and Superman/Batman (both with Jeph Loeb). In 2006 he signed a one-year exclusivity deal with Marvel and, in 2007 launched a new Hulk series with writer Jeph Loeb, spinning out of the 2007 World War Hulk crossover series.

==== Rob Liefeld ====
Liefeld has occasionally solicited and sometimes published various comics under his new Arcade Comics imprint (2003–2006), including several attempts to relaunch Youngblood. These have included a single issue of Youngblood: Bloodsport (July 2003), an unfinished projected mini-series with art by Liefeld, and written by current Marvel star Mark Millar; two issues of a semi-ongoing series entitled Youngblood: Genesis (July 2003, March 2004) by Kurt Busiek and Brandon Thomas (art by Chad and Eric Walker, who had previously worked on Awesome's Prophet (2000) and a single issue of Youngblood: Imperial by rising star Robert Kirkman (art by Marat Mychaels). Liefeld briefly returned to work for both DC (on two issues of Teen Titans in 2005) and Marvel (Onslaught Reborn mini-series with Jeph Loeb).

== Awesome Comics bibliography ==
Due to the vast number of alternative covers, varied publication history, etc., the below list should not be considered exhaustive.

=== Extreme Studios ===
- Avengelyne
- Badrock
- Badrock and Company
- Bloodstrike
- Bloodpool
- Brigade
- Team Youngblood
- Youngblood Strikefile
- Youngblood
- Supreme
- Glory
- Prophet
- New-Men

=== 1997 ===
- Awesome Entertainment Preview by Churchill, Liefeld, and Platt (cover by Liefeld and Jonathan "Jon" Sibal)
  - Contains 12-page preview of Awesome's comics: Agent: America, The Coven, and Re:Gex
- Coven: Special Exclusive Edition #1A (red), 1A (gold)
  - Kaboom preview flipbook
- Judgment Day Sourcebook by Moore, Sprouse, and Veitch (cover by Liefeld; American Entertainment exclusive)
- Re:Gex (A! List) Ashcan (cover by Liefeld)
  - Black-and-white preview, sketches

Supreme

Supreme #1–42 were published by Image Comics; Supreme: The New Adventures #43–48 by Maximum Press; and Supreme #49–56 and Supreme: The Return #1–6 by Awesome Comics.

- Supreme #49 (May 1997) by Moore, Mark Pajarillo, and Veitch (cover by Liefeld and Sibal)
- Supreme #50A, 50B (June 1997) by Moore, Sprouse, and Veitch (covers by Sprouse and Liefeld)
  - Includes a pin-up gallery featuring the work of Dan Jurgens and Al Gordon, Ian Churchill and Norm Rapmund, Adam Pollina and Sibal, Liefeld and Sibal, Ed McGuinness and Gordon, J. Morrigan and Rapmund, Jeff Matsuda and Sibal, Brian Murray and Liefeld, Sprouse and Gordon, Melinda Gebbie, Veitch, Stephen Platt and Lary Stucker.
- Supreme #51 (July 1997) by Moore, Morrigan, and Veitch (cover by Liefeld and Sibal)
- Supreme #52A (Sept. 1997) by Moore, Morrigan, and Pajarillo; O'Neill, Veitch, and Mooney (cover by Sprouse)
- Supreme #52B (Sept. 1997) by Moore, Morrigan, and Gordon with Veitch (cover by Sprouse)
  - Originally intended as an "80-page Giant", Supreme #52 was split into two comics, "52A" and "52B".
- Supreme #53 (Oct. 1997) by Moore, Sprouse, and Gordon (cover by Sprouse)
- Supreme #54 (Nov. 1997) by Moore, Gebbie, Sprouse, Veitch, and Morrigan (cover by Sprouse)
- Supreme #55 (Dec. 1997) by Moore, Gil Kane, and Sprouse (cover by Sprouse)
- Supreme #56A, 56B (Feb. 1998) by Moore, Sprouse, and Veitch (covers by Sprouse and McGuinness)

Judgment Day

- Judgment Day (Alpha) #1A, 1B, 1C, 1D (June 1997) by Moore, Giffen, Jurgens, Kane, Liefeld, Platt, and Pollina (covers by Gibbons, Liefeld, and Dan Panosian)
- Judgment Day (Omega) #2A, 2B (July 1997) by Moore, Dodson, Liefeld, Platt, Skroce, Sprouse, and Starlin (covers by Gibbons, Liefeld, and Panosian)
- Judgment Day #3A, 3B (Oct. 1997) by Moore, Churchill, Johnson, Liefeld, Marat Mychaels, Nocon, Veitch (covers by Gibbons)
- Judgment Day Aftermath #1A, 1B (Jan. 1998) by Moore and Kane (covers by Pollina and McGuinness)
- Fighting American #1A, 1A (gold), 1B, 1C, 1D, 1L (Liberty edition, Comic Cavalcade exclusive), 1L (gold), 1R (Comic-Con exclusive), 1ROB (Comic-Con signed) (Aug. 1997) by Liefeld, Loeb, and Platt
- Fighting American #2A, 2B (Oct. 1997) by Liefeld, Loeb, and Platt
- Coven #1A, 1A (chrome), 1B, 1C, 1D, 1E, 1F, 1G, 1H, 1I, 1J, 1K, 1 (American Entertainment exclusive) (Aug. 1997) by Loeb and Churchill (covers by Liefeld, Pollina, and Churchill)
- Coven #2A, 2B, 2B (gold + DF) (Sept. 1997) by Loeb and Churchill
- Coven #3A, 3B, 3C (Nov. 1997) by Loeb and Churchill
  - Re:Gex preview flipbook
- Coven #4A, 4B, 4C (Jan. 1998) by Loeb and Churchill
  - Re:Gex preview flipbook
- Coven #5A (+ DF), 5B (+ DF) (March 1998) by Loeb and Churchill
  - Re:Gex preview flipbook
- Coven #6 (+ DF/2000) (July 1998) by Loeb and Churchill
  - Re:Gex preview flipbook
- Chapel vol. 3, #1 (Sept. 1997) by John Stinsman
- Kaboom #1A, 1A (gold), 1B, 1C, 1D, 1 (DF) (Sept. 1997) by Loeb and Matsuda (covers by Matsuda, McGuinness, and Sale)
- Kaboom #2A, 2A (gold), 2B, 2JEFF (Wizard signed) (Oct. 1997) by Loeb and Matsuda (covers by Matsuda)
- Kaboom #3A, 3B, 3 (DF) (Nov. 1997) by Loeb and Matsuda (covers by Matsuda and Liefeld)
- Fighting American Rules of the Game #1A, 1B, 1C, 1 (DF/2500), 1 (DF signed/500) (Nov. 1997) by Loeb and McGuinness (covers by McGuinness and Liefeld)
- Fighting American Rules of the Game #2A, 2B, 2C (Jan. 1998) by Loeb and McGuinness (covers by McGuinness and Liefeld)
  - Flipbook with preview for Swat
- Fighting American Rules of the Game #3A, 3B (March 1998) by Loeb and McGuinness (covers by McGuinness and Liefeld)
- Awesome Holiday Special #1A (gold), 1A (white) (Dec. 1997) by Liefeld, Loeb, and Moore; Churchill, Liefeld, Matsuda, and Skroce
  - Youngblood/Kaboom flipbook
- Awesome Holiday Special #1B (Dec. 1997) by Liefeld, Loeb, and Moore; Churchill, Liefeld, Matsuda, and Skroce
  - The Coven/Kaboom flipbook

=== 1998 ===
- Awesome Preview by Moore and Peterson; Starlin and Platt; Liefeld and Loeb (cover by Liefeld and Peterson)
  - Glory/Re:Gex flipbook. Contains 8-page black-and-white "Glory and the Gate of Tears"; Fighting American; Re:Gex. Exclusive convention preview from San Diego Comic-Con.
- Scarlet Crush #1A, 1B, 1C, 1D, 1E (American Entertainment edition), 1F (Jan. 1998) by Stinsman with Rapmund (covers by Sprouse, Liefeld, Skroce, Churchill, Stinsman, and Rapmund)
- Scarlet Crush #2A, 2B, 2C (Feb. 1998) (covers by Stinsman, Rapmund, Peterson, McGuinness)
- Coven Fantom Special (another Universe exclusive) #1, 1 (gold) (Feb. 1998) by Loeb and Churchill (covers by Churchill, Horie, and Rapmund)
- Kaboom Prelude Ashcan (American Entertainment exclusive) #1, 1 (gold) (Feb. 1998) by Loeb and Matsuda (covers by Matsuda and "Jon" Sibal)

Youngblood

- Youngblood vol. 3, #1A, 1B, 1C, 1D, 1D (gold), 1E, 1F, 1G, 1H (gold), 1H (DF/1000), 1I, 1J, 1K, 1K (silver) (Feb. 1998) by Moore and Skroce (covers by Matt Banning, Churchill, Gordon, Liefeld, McGuinness, Peterson, Booch, Platt, Rapmund, Skroce, Sprouse, Lary Stucker, Wieringo, and Jae Lee)
- Youngblood vol. 3, #2A, 2B (Aug. 1998) by Moore and Skroce (covers by Liefeld and Sibal, Skroce and Stucker)
- Coven "Fan Appreciation Edition" (March 1998) by Loeb? and Churchill? (cover by Churchill)
  - Reprints issue #1
- Fighting American Dogs of War Preview (July 1998) by Starlin and Platt
  - Black-and-white convention preview
- Menace Preview (Aug. 1998) by Jada Pinkett Smith and Dan Fraga
  - Exclusive Menace preview and Coven sketchbook from Comic-Con
- Six-String Samurai Ashcan (Aug. 1998) by Hawkins, Liefeld, Fraga, and Stinsman (black-and-white cover by Liefeld)
- Six-String Samurai #1 (Sept. 1998) by Hawkins, Liefeld, Fraga, and Stinsman (cover by Liefeld)
- Coven #1 (black-and-white) (Sept. 1998) by Loeb and Churchill
- Fighting American Dogs of War #1A, 1B, 1T (Tour edition) (Sept. 1998) by Starlin and Platt (covers by Liefeld and Platt)
- Fighting American Dogs of War #2A, 2B (Dec. 1998) by Starlin and Platt (covers by Liefeld and Platt)
- Fighting American Dogs of War #3 (May 1999) by Starlin and Platt
- Re:Gex #1A, 1B, 1B (Wizard World Special Edition), 1C, 1D (Double Trouble Edition: Blue), 1D (Double Trouble Edition: Red) (Sept. 1998)
- Re:Gex #0A, 0B, 0C (Dec. 1998) (covers by Liefeld, Pat Lee, Alvin Lee)
- Menace #1A, 1B, 1C (Nov. 1998) by Smith and Fraga (covers by Fraga and Liefeld)

=== 1999 ===
- Awesome Preview '99 (Jan. 1999) (front cover "Supreme" by Ross; back cover "Lionheart")
  - Awesome/Lionheart flipbook. 24-pages of black-and-white sketches.
- Coven vol. 2, #1A, 1B, 1C, 1D, 1AY (DF), 1BY (DF/5000), 1Y (DF chrome/5000), 1Z (DF chrome 2/5000) (Jan. 1999) by Loeb and Churchill (covers by Fraga, Liefeld, Edwin Rosell, Churchill, and Rapmund)
- Coven vol. 2, #2A, 2B, 2AY (DF) (March 1999) by Loeb and Churchill (covers by Churchill and Rapmund)
- Coven vol. 2, #3 (June 1999) by Loeb and Churchill (covers by Churchill and Rapmund)
- Coven vol. 2, #4, 4AY (DF) (Dec. 1999) by Loeb and Churchill (covers by Churchill and Rapmund)
  - An 8-page story issued as the flipside to Lionheart #2.
- Avengelyne #1A, 1B, 1C, 1D (March 1999) by Liefeld and Fraga (covers by Liefeld, Stinsman, and Pat Lee)
- Glory #0A, 0B, 0C, 0C (DF/3000), 0E (DF sketch), 0F (DF bikini), 0G (DF sketch signed/2000) (March 1999) by Moore and "Brand" Peterson (covers by Peterson, Churchill, Fraga, and Liefeld)
  - Reprints Awesome Preview story.
- Alan Moore's Awesome Universe Handbook #1A, 1B (April 1999) by Moore, Ross, Skroce, and Sprouse (2 covers by Ross in a 3:1 ratio)
  - Contains 17 pages of black-and-white Ross sketches; 6 pages of notes on Glory; 6 pages of notes on the new Youngblood; Supreme poster by Sprouse and Gordon; 3-page preview from Youngblood #3.

Supreme: The Return

Supreme #1–42 were published by Image Comics; Supreme: The New Adventures #43–48 by Maximum Press; and Supreme #49–56 and Supreme: The Return #1–6 by Awesome Comics.

- Supreme: The Return #1A, 1B, 1C (May 1999) by Moore and Sprouse (covers by Fraga, Liefeld, Ross, and Sprouse)
- Supreme: The Return #2 [2B?, 2C?] (June 1999) by Moore and Starlin (cover by Liefeld)
- Supreme: The Return #3A, 3B (Nov. 1999) by Moore, Matt Smith, Veitch, and Baikie (covers by Liefeld and Smith)
  - Flipbook with preview of Brigade.
- Supreme: The Return #4 (March 2000) by Moore, Smith, and Veitch (cover by Liefeld)
- Supreme: The Return #5 (May 2000) by Moore, Churchill, and Veitch (cover by Churchill)
- Supreme: The Return #6 (June 2000) by Moore, Liefeld, and Veitch (cover by Liefeld)
- Coven: Dark Origins #1A, 1B, 1B (platinum), 1B (red) (July 1999) by Loeb and Churchill (covers by Churchill, Rapmund, and Matt Yackey)
  - Flipbook with preview for Black Seed.
- Kaboom Preview (Comic-Con special preview of 2nd series.)
- Kaboom vol. 2, #1A, 1B, 1C, 1C (blue foil signed), 1D, 1E (silver), 1E (gold foil, 1/50) (July 1999) by Liefeld, Loeb, and Grant (covers by Grant, Matsuda, Fraga, Liefeld, and Madureira)
- Kaboom vol. 2, #2A, 2A (silver), 2B (Aug. 1999) by Liefeld, Loeb, and Grant (covers by Grant, Rapmund, and Madureira)
- Kaboom vol. 2, #3A, 3B (Dec. 1999) by Liefeld, Loeb, and Grant (covers by Grant)
- Awesome Adventures #1A (+ DF/4000), 1B, 1C (Aug. 1999) by Moore and Skroce (covers by Ross featuring Suprema)
  - Continues from Youngblood #2.
- Lionheart Ashcan #1 (Wizard World '99) (July 1999) by Churchill and Loeb (cover by Churchill)
- Lionheart #1A (DF), 1B, 1C, 1D, 1E (Aug. 1999) by Churchill and Loeb (covers by Churchill, Rapmund, Grant, and Arthur Thibert)
- Lionheart #2A, 2B (Dec. 1999) by Churchill and Loeb (covers by Churchill, Rapmund, and Adams)
  - Flipbook with Coven #4.

=== 2000 ===
- Prophet #1A, 1B (March 2000) by Liefeld, Robert Napton, Churchill, and the Walker Bros. (Chad and Eric)
  - Flipbook.
- Prophet Legacy by Liefeld, Napton, and the Walker Bros. (covers by Jim Lee and McFarlane)
- Brigade vol. 3, #1A, 1B (July 2000) by Stucker (covers by Liefeld and Grant)
