= Supreme (character) =

Fictional superhero created by Rob Liefeld

- Supreme, Suprema, and Radar by Alex Ross

Publication information
- Publisher: Image Comics; Maximum Press; Awesome Entertainment; Arcade Comics
- First appearance: Youngblood #3 (October 1992)
- Created by: Rob Liefeld (concept, story); Brian Murray (story, art)

In-story information
- Alter ego: Ethan Crane
- Team affiliations: Brigade; Heavy Mettle; Allied Supermen of America; The Allies; The Supremacy
- Notable aliases: Kid Supreme; Supreme-Mite
- Abilities: Superhuman strength, speed, stamina, durability, breath, and vision; Molecular adaptation to any threat; Flight

Supreme is a superhero created by Rob Liefeld and published by Image Comics (1992–96), followed by Maximum Press (1996–98), Awesome Entertainment (1999–2000), Arcade Comics (2006) and Image again (2012–15). Although Supreme was originally conceived as a violent egotistical antihero and Superman archetype, he was retooled by Alan Moore as a tribute to Mort Weisinger's Silver Age Superman.

The character had a 56-issue comic book series, a six-issue miniseries, and a revival in 2012 consisting of six issues. Beginning with issue #41, Moore's run was collected in two trade paperbacks from the Checker Book Publishing Group, Supreme: The Story of the Year and Supreme: The Return. Moore's work on the series earned him an Eisner Award for Best Writer in 1997.

== Fictional character biography ==
=== Supreme ===
The cover art for Supreme #1 by Brian Murray

Supreme is introduced in issue #3 of Rob Liefeld's Youngblood limited series as a backup story before being spun off into his own series. His history varies; at one point, he is an angel of vengeance who quotes the Bible to justify his actions. At other times, such as when he defeats the Norse god Thor and takes his mystical hammer Mjölnir, Supreme considers himself a god. Although the most powerful being in the Liefeld universe, he has his share of defeats: he is killed in the cross-title Deathmate Black series (published by Image and Valiant Comics), loses his powers in Extreme Prejudice, and is killed by Crypt in Extreme Sacrifice.

The character receives a comprehensive treatment in The Legend of Supreme, a three-issue miniseries by Keith Giffen and Robert Loren Fleming. In the miniseries, reporter Maxine Winslow investigates Supreme's origin story. Winslow learns that in 1937, Ethan Crane shot and killed two men in retaliation for the rape of a 15-year-old girl. Crane was shot by two police officers but survived and was sentenced to life imprisonment. In prison, the government offered him a chance to participate in a human-improvement experiment in the hope that (unlike the six previous guinea pigs) he would survive.

Although Crane died like the others, he returned to life in a world which was strange and new to him. He found his way to a church, where he received sanctuary from Father Beam and discovered some of his new abilities. Crane took the name "Supreme" and, hearing about the war in Europe, decided to do his part. Little was revealed about Supreme's work in World War II, except that he joined the Allies. After the war, Supreme believed that he had done his part as a good Samaritan and left Earth; in reality, Father Beam's accidental death at his hands drove him away.

Supreme spends decades in space, fighting several threats on the side of an alien race known as the Kalyptans (the race of Gary Carlson and Erik Larsen's Vanguard).

He returns to Earth in 1992 to find a changed society, which includes genetically enhanced superpowered humans on teams such as Youngblood directed by Alexander Graves (later revealed to be Lucifer); and Heavy Mettle directed by Jason Temple. When Supreme reappeared on Earth after 47 years, Temple was convinced Supreme would be Heavy Mettle's perfect leader. Although Supreme is briefly the field team leader of Heavy Mettle, he leaves the position after defeating the villain Khrome.

When Supreme fights Thor for Mjolnir, a character named Enigma acquires another Supreme from an alternate timeline to store if Supreme is defeated. Supreme is victorious, so the other Supreme is left alone; this figures in the events of The Legend of Supreme. Although Supreme apparently dies during an assault on humanity by Lord Chapel, he is stranded on an alternate Earth for several years until the alternate Supreme (stored by Enigma) returns and is defeated by the original Supreme. Original Supreme switches bodies with his double, restoring his powers. After several events involving Enigma and Probe (Supreme's daughter from the future, also known as Lady Supreme), the original Supreme works with Probe, Enigma, and the alternate Supreme to defeat the evil Norse god Loki (who shifted realities). At the end of Supreme #40, Probe remains on the alternate Earth and Supreme returns to Earth.

=== Alan Moore's Supreme ===
Cover art for Supreme #41 (after Superman #1), the start of Alan Moore's run; art by Jerry Ordway

Rob Liefeld asked Alan Moore to write for Supreme. Moore agreed on the condition that he could reinvent the character since he felt that the comic was "not very good." Beginning with issue #41 of Supreme in 1996, Moore began retooling the character, with each issue containing commentary on storytelling, comics history in general and Superman in particular. Moore's approach drew on his fondness for the storytelling found in editor Mort Weisinger's Silver Age Superman stories. Prior to DC Comics' landmark maxiseries event Crisis on Infinite Earths, Moore wrote the "final" Silver Age Superman story (Superman: Whatever Happened to the Man of Tomorrow?) for editor Julius Schwartz, with Silver Age stalwart artists Curt Swan and Murphy Anderson (Anderson was also referenced in Moore's Image-published homage to Marvel's tales, 1963).

Moore said in later interviews that his re-imagining of Supreme's background and origin was partly an apology for the darkness of his previous works at other publishers; he had a reputation for the cynical deconstruction of superheroes based on Batman: The Killing Joke, Marvelman, and Watchmen.

==== "Story of the Year" ====
Given free rein over Supreme and the wider Maximum (later Awesome) universe, Moore created a storyline to both entirely reinvent the character's world, and meld it with Liefeld's extant continuity. In Moore's first issue, Supreme returns to Earth and discovers that he is living in a new revision of reality.

The new version of Supreme has a secret identity as Ethan Crane, a mild-mannered artist for Dazzle Comics whose powers are a result of a childhood exposure to a meteorite made of Supremium, an element which can alter reality. When not saving the world as a superhero, Crane illustrates the adventures of Omniman (not to be confused with Omni-Man), a Supreme-like character being reintroduced with a change of writers.

Echoing this change, Supreme encounters a number of previous/retired and parallel iterations of himself living in another reality, called the "Supremacy." The Supremacy is a form of afterlife for characters whose stories had ended or have been written out of current continuity. After experiencing amnesia, Supreme's returning memories are told on the page in flashback form revising and ret-conning the character's complex and oft-rewritten backstory, often in pastiche style evoking different periods of comics history.

Darius Dax, a Lex Luthor–like evil genius and Supreme's antagonist, is introduced in this storyline. Dax dies twice in the series, the first time in prison from lymphatic cancer caused by exposure to Supremium.

Although the "Story of the Year" arc was intended to finish with another deliberate Silver Age-evoking conceit — the 80-Page Giant special issue — publishing needs instead saw the 52nd issue split into two parts: 52a and 52b.

According to Liefeld, the storytelling methods and styles Moore honed on Supreme directly informed his subsequent America's Best Comics title Tom Strong.

==== The Return ====
Supreme: The Return #5: the original Supremium II Man; art by Ian Churchill

Moore continued working on the series until Supreme #56, when it became a miniseries entitled Supreme: The Return. After six issues, the miniseries was cancelled when Awesome Comics collapsed. According to artist Rick Veitch, Moore had written an additional issue or two which were never published; Supreme: The Return's "biggest failing is that the final issue of the story was never produced. This volume takes care of that little problem by ignoring it completely and just tacking 'The End' on the last story."

After Darius Dax is defeated, Supreme finds an ember of Judy Jordan's consciousness in her body and transfers it to a Suprematon android. Although Judy now has superpowers, she has trouble adjusting to another body and missing the last 20 years of her life. S-1, the only other sentient Suprematon, expresses his love for her. He changes his name to Talos, and they are married by Supreme in the Citadel Supreme (Supreme's floating fortress). They leave Earth and find an uninhabited planet on which to live.

Ethan Crane's romance with Diana Dane falters when she becomes annoyed with the way he "gets all weird and runs away." After arranging a meeting as Ethan, he tries to reconcile with her as Supreme, giving her a tour of the Citadel to give her ideas for Omniman. After a trip to the Supremacy, Diana discovers Ethan's identity and is willing to continue their relationship.

After Darius Dax becomes the Supremium meteorite at the end of The Story of the Year he is sent to Daxia, a place similar to the Supremacy. Every version of Dax before him lives in Daxia, including Darius Duck, Daxian, Doomsdax, mad Nazi scientist Dax, and serial-killer transvestite 1980s Dax. The combined intelligence of the Daxes allows him to return to the land of the living. Again, trying to destroy Supreme, he sets in motion another chain of events involving Billy Friday and Master Meteor.

==== Announced finish ====
At New York Comic Con 2011, Rob Liefeld and Erik Larsen announced that the last unpublished Supreme stories would be published and drawn by Larsen. Supreme #63 was published in 2012 by Image Comics, with Moore's final completed Supreme script.

=== Erik Larsen's Supreme ===
Erik Larsen wrote and drew Supreme for five issues (#64–68), seeing Moore's work on the title purged and Liefield's early-1990s version of the character restored. On the letter page of his first issue, Larsen wrote, "My thought was to marry the two and take what Alan had done and what came before and try to find something in the middle which might appeal to both audiences.".

He opened with a resurrected Darius Dax and his counterparts laying siege to the Supremacy, killing Supreme's counterparts with weapons stolen from the Supremacy's armory. Supreme the Fifth (ruler of the Supremacy and the Supreme Supreme), Radar the hound Supreme, 90 percent of the past Supremes, and the supporting members of the Supremacy (including Billy Friday and Judy Jordan) are killed. To stop the killing spree, the surviving Supremes (Moore's Supreme, the 1950s Supreme with a lion's head, Squeak—the mouse Supreme, the 1970s Sister Supreme, and the original Supreme) free Rob Liefield's original Supreme from his imprisonment. Called "mean" Supreme in the comic, his violent, bigoted, and psychotic behavior led to his restraint with chains in a subarea of the Supremacy. Freed by the "modern" Supreme and "original" Supreme, "mean" Supreme murders all the Darius Daxes, turns against the heroic Supremes, removes their powers with Silver Supremium, and carries the Supremacy to the Moon.

During the fight, Earth is again revised. "Mean" Supreme goes on a killing spree, murdering criminals, to re-establish his position as the most powerful superhero on the planet. He also viciously beats Suprema into a coma and engages in a brawl with Omni-Man, the father of Invincible and the only other hero with comparable powers. Diane Dane and "modern" Supreme are aware of the reboot, and she has a new life with someone other than Supreme, although she realizes she is pregnant with Supreme's child. The surviving Supremes try to adjust to their helplessness in ending the "mean" Supreme's rampage. Ethan Crane learns that his alter ego's life is gone in the reboot; he cannot find work as a comic-book artist because his talent came from his Supreme power. Larsen's run ends with the surviving Supremes discussing the possibility that their powered selves still exist in the Supremacy.

=== Warren Ellis' Supreme ===
The character was revived again in 2015 in a seven-issue miniseries published by Image Comics written by Warren Ellis entitled Supreme: Blue Rose. The miniseries incorporates elements and characters from Alan Moore's run and Liefeld's original concept. The setup of the story also obliquely references the events of Larsen's run.

The universe of Blue Rose initially closely resembles reality, with no superpowered individuals or fictional elements. Magic and science-fiction level technology are non-existent, and superheroes are the stuff of comic books. Throughout the series, the world of the story becomes gradually more fantastical.

Decorated but unemployed and slightly mentally ill investigative journalist Diana Dane has a dream where Danny Fuller informs her that the universe is only months old, and warns her not to trust Darius Dax. The next morning, she meets with and is hired by Dax to investigate strange events in the small town of Littlehaven. Although the official story is that a plane crashed onto Littlehaven, in fact the ruins of a golden city fell out of the sky onto the town. Dax shows Diana an arch emblazoned with the word "Supreme" recovered from the crash site, as well as a video showing local man Ethan Crane seemingly exploding into bright light moments before the crash.

Diana heads to Littlehaven to investigate, accompanied by Linda, aka "Twilight Girl Marvel", and followed by an assassin named Reuben Tube, who plans to kill Ethan on Dax's orders. She continues to encounter Danny in dreams, and also experiences strange visions and observes unusual phenomena such as naturally occurring blue roses and three-winged birds. Objects and characters from the in-universe television serial Professor Night begin to bleed through into reality.

It is eventually revealed that the Supremacy was destroyed by an army of Darius Daxes, triggering a revision. However, the destruction of the Supremacy and subsequent crash onto Earth resulted in the revision going badly wrong. The new version of Supreme did not fully come into existence, and persons from previous revisions are appearing in the current one, in some cases retaining partial memories of their prior existence. Reality is in flux, with the earliest point of stability being the 29th century. Time traveller Zayla Zarn, reasoning that the present is doomed, begins gathering her friends in the current era and transporting them to the future.

Meanwhile, brilliant scientist Chelsea Henry has discovered an anomaly in the cosmic background radiation that stretches across the timestream, from four months in the past to the 30th Century. A stream of information is transmitted from the future into Chelsea's mind, transforming her into Probe. Probe experiences visions of the possible coming centuries of chaos and joins with Doc Rocket, a speedster superhero from the last revision, to locate Supreme.

In Littlehaven, Diana interviews the survivors of the crash and learns that, while everyone can remember Ethan Crane's existence, no one has any specific memories of him or the details of his life. She meets with local priest Father John Oliver "Jack" Lancombe, who informs her that Judy Jordan has constructed a memorial museum to the crash in her home on the outskirts of town. However, Jack, who has regained his memories and powers as the superhero Jack O'Lantern from an earlier revision, attacks Diana and is killed by Reuben. Reuben reports back to Dax, who heads to Littlehaven alone.

Diana and Linda go to the museum and meet an elderly Judy Jordan from a revision where she and Supreme were married and Diana died as a child, and Ethan Crane, who has been hiding out at Judy's home. Ethan, who retains memories of multiple earlier revisions, explains that he is unable to act as Supreme and is planning to simply wait for the next revision. Reuben arrives to kill Ethan but is himself killed by Professor Night and Evening Primrose, fictional characters who have crossed over into reality. Dax, Doc Rocket, and Probe also arrive on the scene. Zayla transports everyone but Ethan, Dax, and Diana to the future, and Ethan encourages Dax to simply wait for the new revision.

However, Dax, unwilling to risk the safety of the universe, produces a raygun created by another Darius Dax recovered from the wreckage of the Supremacy and shoots Ethan, triggering a revision. In the new revision Diana Dane, the city editor of the newspaper "Dazzle News" notices a vase of blue roses on her desk, and then receives reports of strange happenings in Littlehaven.

== Villains ==
- Darius Dax: Supreme's archenemy who, like Supreme, has several incarnations. Equivalent to Lex Luthor.
- Emerpus: Reverse Supreme from the Backwards Zone. Equivalent to Bizarro.
- Gorrl: Living galaxy who is obsessed with Suprema and holds her captive for 30 years.
- Korgo (first name Brinn): Warlord from space who defeats Bill Clinton under the rules of the Cosmic Dictators Guild and wins.
- Master Meteor: First appears in Littlehaven in search of the Supremium isotope.
- Optilux: Religious alien who becomes a being of pure light with a messiah complex. Equivalent to Brainiac.
- Televillain: Television repairman who gains the ability to enter the fictional worlds of television programmes. Real name is Reuben Tube. Equivalent to Ambush Bug.
- The End: Powerful villain in the Hell of Mirrors.
- Shadow Supreme: Evil version of Supreme that is created by Darius Dax's negative energy ray.
- Slaver Ant: Pink-colored female humanoid ant-like creature who secretes behavior-altering chemicals.
- Szazs: Sprite Supreme from the 19th dimension. A mischievous character who played tricks on Supreme. Equivalent to Mxyzptlk.
- Vor-Em: Humanoid lion warrior.

== Supremium ==
Supremium is the source of the Supreme's power. As a child, Ethan Crane finds a meteorite composed of pure Supremium, which turns his hair white and gives him various powers such as flight, invulnerability, strength, intelligence, and speed.

== Supreme Sacrifice ==
In 2006, Arcade Comics published Supreme's return in a comic by Robert Kirkman, Jon Malin, and Rob Liefeld.

== Other versions ==
Suprema and Radar, by Alex Ross

=== Kid Supreme ===
During World War II, Charles Flanders discovers he can tap into Supreme's power and become the first Kid Supreme. The second Kid Supreme, Danny Fuller, receives superpowers during a fight between Supreme and Union. Alan Moore's Kid Supreme, a younger version of Supreme, is an homage to Superboy.

Another version of Danny Fuller appears in Supreme: Blue Rose.

=== Probe ===
Probe, the daughter of Glory and Supreme, is later called Lady Supreme. Although she is removed from reality by Alan Moore's retool, she still exists in the Supremacy.

A very different version of Probe appears in Supreme: Blue Rose. She is a brilliant but disengaged young scientist named Chelsea Henry, who is provided with knowledge and power over time and space from the 30th Century.

=== Suprema ===
Suprema is Supreme's sister, Sally Crane. She is later exposed to some Supremium.

== Collections ==
=== United States ===
Supreme #23 was reprinted in the Extreme Sacrifice trade paperback (ISBN 1-887279-06-7) in August 1995.

- Supreme Madness—Supreme #12–18 (Image Comics, 160 pages, 1996, ISBN 1-888610-06-9)
- Supreme: The Story of the Year—collects Supreme #41–52 (Checker Book Publishing Group, 2002, 332 pages, ISBN 0-9710249-5-2)
- Supreme: The Return—collects Supreme #53–56 and Supreme: The Return #1–6 (Checker Book Publishing Group, 2003, 258 pages, ISBN 0-9710249-6-0)
- Supreme: Blue Rose—collects Supreme: Blue Rose #1–7, Image Comics, 160 pages, 2015, ISBN 1632153122

=== France ===
Licensed by Checker, using the same layout and images with a French translation:

- Suprême, Tome 1: L'Âge d'or (Delcourt Contrebande, 2004, 324 pages, ISBN 2-84789-065-3)
- Suprême, Tome 2: Le Retour (Delcourt Contrebande, 2009, 324 pages, ISBN 2-84789-219-2)

=== Spain ===
Licensed by Checker, using the same layout and images with a Spanish translation:

- Supreme, Tomo 1: La Historia del Año (Random House Mondadori, 2011)
- Supreme, Tomo 2: El Retorno (Random House Mondadori, 2011)

=== Germany ===
- Supreme: The Story of the Year, Part 1 (Nona Arte, March 2011, 152 pages, ISBN 978-88-97062-10-3)
- Supreme: The Story of the Year, Part 2 (Nona Arte, April 2011, 168 pages, ISBN 978-88-97062-11-0)
