= Bloodstrike (Image Comics) =

Comic book series

- Cover of Bloodstrike #1 (remastered edition) by Dan Fraga and Rob Liefeld

Publication information
- Publisher: Extreme Studios (Image Comics)
- First appearance: Bloodstrike #1 (April 1993)
- Created by: Rob Liefeld; Eric Stephenson; Dan Fraga

In-story information
- Base(s): Pentagon
- Member(s): Cabbot Stone; Fourplay; Deadlock; Shogun; Tag; Chapel

Bloodstrike is a comic book series created by writer/artist Rob Liefeld as part of his Extreme Studios production company, and which debuted in 1993 through Image Comics as a spinoff of Liefeld's other property Youngblood. Bloodstrike features a squad of assassins, each of whom is a super-powered operative who died in the line of duty and was resurrected by a secret government program called Project Born Again. The group is led by Cabbot Stone, and its other members include Fourplay, Deadlock, Shogun, Tag, and Chapel.

== Publication history ==
Bloodstrike #1 was cover dated April 1993 and the series ran for 22 issues. There was a special issue 25 printed (after issue 10) as part of the "Images of Tomorrow" event that ran through several titles being published by Image at the time. During issue 25, the Bloodstrike title changed dramatically as Bloodstrike became the name of a solo agent. Extreme Studios boasted that the issue depicted precisely where the series would be at the end of issue 24, but issues 23 and 24 were not produced. It was later revealed that Cabbot Stone was the masked individual named Bloodstrike.

After the Bloodstrike series concluded, a sequel titled Bloodstrike: Assassin ran for three issues (plus an issue #0) featuring art by Karl Altstaetter. The character of Bloodstrike returned once again in Cabbot: Bloodhunter. Only the first issue was printed, though parts 2 and 3 were printed as backup stories in the pages of Supreme.

Following an 18-year hiatus, Bloodstrike was revived for issues 26 to 33 (Image Comics, March 2012 – December 2012). The eight-issue run was written by Tim Seeley with art by Francesco Gaston, and continued to follow Cabbot and his exploits with the company. It took on a more satirical tone, as it examined the moral implications of resurrecting the dead, rather than simply focusing on action as did the previous run.

A three-issue mini-series written and illustrated by Michel Fiffe was published by Image Comics from June to August in 2018: an issue #0 origin story, and the "missing" issues 23 and 24.

== Fictional team history ==
Bloodstrike follows an elite team of government operatives who were killed in action but resurrected by military scientists. The team members all require ongoing treatment sessions to stay alive and are thus unable to ever leave the project or opt against participating in a mission.

The main character and team leader was Cabbot Stone, brother of ex-Youngblood member and Brigade member Battlestone. Other members include the four-armed combat expert Fourplay, the savage ex-villain Deadlock, the power-armored Shogun and the enigmatic Tag, who could force people to "freeze in place" by touching them. The computer in charge of teleporting the team was named Roam, who had to re-charge its cells after each transport. In the first issue, the team is sent to a G.A.T.E. (Genetic and Technological Engineering) facility and battle and kill Commander Corben, who hired them to prove his facility is worthy.

At one point the government added the recently diagnosed HIV-positive character of Chapel to the roster, making him the only living member of the team. This membership would prove to be short lived. It was through Bloodstrike's access to classified government files that Chapel learns that the undead vigilante Spawn was really his former friend Al Simmons, who had been murdered by Chapel himself but has returned from the dead. Shortly after this revelation, Chapel kills himself in an attempt to gain power in death by bargaining with Hell's leadership, as Spawn had done.

Eventually the team's government supervisor, Noble, was revealed to be a member of The Covenant of the Sword, a villainous cyborg conspiracy. Noble's exposure (and death) resulted in the demise of all of Bloodstrike's members except for Cabbot. His memory was erased and he was renamed Bloodstrike as the comic became a solo (rather than team) book. However, it was revealed in issues 19 and 20 that the rest of Bloodstrike had been revived yet again, but this time as fully living beings due to being restored to life through Nu-Gene radiation therapy.

== Proposed film adaptation ==
On August 20, 2012, Liefeld was set to produce a Bloodstrike film adaptation with Adi Shankar's 1984 Private Defense Contractors and Brooklyn Weaver's Energy Entertainment.

On October 12, 2023, Liefeld debuted on his Instagram account a proof of concept trailer for Bloodstrike, directed by Philip J. Silvera, who had met Liefeld during production of the 2016 Deadpool film, on which Silvera had served as stunt coordinator and second unit director. Over the years, interest had been expressed in the property by individuals such as Akiva Goldsman and Graham King, and production companies such as Netflix, which optioned the development rights, but these eventually expired without any produced results. Liefeld explained in the caption that accompanied the trailer that he released it in the hopes of spurring renewed interest in producing a Bloodstrike film, saying, "When taking a comic book from page to screen there are always hurdles, screenplay, screenwriters, talent that attach and move on. It gets old really fast." Liefeld hoped the film would be directed by Silvera, whom Liefeld said had expressed not only a significant knowledge of comics, but a passion for the characters of Liefeld's Extreme Studios. According to Liefeld, Silvera had also expressed a commitment during the COVID-19 pandemic to make a Bloodstrike film after his commitments at the time were fulfilled, beginning with the trailer.

== See also ==
- List of Image Comics publications
