= Brigade (comics) =

Comic book

- Cover to Brigade (Volume 1) #1 (1992) by Rob Liefeld and Paul Scott.

Group publication information
- Publisher: Image Comics; Awesome Entertainment
- First appearance: Brigade #1 (August 1992)
- Created by: Rob Liefeld; Marat Mychaels

In-story information
- Member(s): Atlas; Badrock; Battlestone; Boone; Coldsnap; Crucible; Dash; Glory; Kaboom; Kayo; Kid Supreme; Lethal; Roman; Seahawk; ShadowHawk; S.P.I.C.E. Stasis; Supreme; Thermal; Tremor; Troll; Vanguard

Brigade

Series publication information
- Publication date: (vol. 1); August 1992 – July 1993 (vol. 2); May 1993 – July 1995 (vol. 3); July 2000 (vol. 4); July 2010
- Number of issues: vol. 1: 4 vol. 2: 25 vol. 3: 1 vol. 4: 1
- Creator(s): Rob Liefeld; Marat Mychaels

Brigade is an American comic book published by Image Comics and later by Awesome Entertainment, created, plotted, and originally written by Rob Liefeld and first illustrated by Marat Mychaels (creator of Demonslayer and artist on X-Force: Shatterstar, Glory, Calavera, Vampiress Hella, Djustine, and many other comics) as a spin-off from the then-popular series Youngblood.

== Publication history ==
The original team was led by Battlestone, who had been a former member of Youngblood, as well as a member of Image Comics' (parody) "Golden Age" team, the Allied Supermen of America. Having been expelled from Youngblood following the deaths of several Youngblood members who at the time were under his command, he later went on to form Brigade alongside Kayo, Boone, and Lethal. But when one of their missions went awry, he disbanded the team, leaving Boone and Lethal out in the cold. Sometime later, at Kayo's urging, Battlestone recruited brothers Seahawk and Coldsnap, using their newly inherited vast wealth to finance the team. Later on, Thermal and Atlas joined the group, and their final member Stasis was introduced as well. The team's first major enemy was the evil Prince Genocide, who wreaked havoc in their city before both he and Brigade were teleported back to Genocide's homeworld and stranded there for a time. After being aided by a group of alien freedom fighters called the Birds of Prey, the team managed to escape back to Earth, but not before a climactic battle with Genocide resulted in the death of Atlas.

The second incarnation of the team came together after Brigade returned to Earth. Stasis, who blamed Battlestone for Atlas' death, immediately resigned from the team, only to be shot dead by Cabbot, leader of the government strike team Bloodstrike, who had orders to take Brigade into custody. During the battle, Kayo and Seahawk were captured and Coldsnap's powers went out of control, turning him into a humanoid ice creature. Battlestone sought out Boone, who was still somewhat bitter about being shut out after the original team folded, but decided to rejoin the new team regardless. Lethal had also resurfaced by now and managed to rescue Seahawk from captivity. Another battle took place between the teams and Kayo was also rescued from captivity by Hacker, Boone's partner. Brigade were the victors and Bloodstrike was defeated. Another new member named Crucible was introduced into the group sometime later. Boone was later revealed to be a traitor to the team working for Project Born Again and stole an exposé on the team written by Thermal, who was an undercover reporter and was given her powers through technology as a means of planting her into the group and exposing it from within. Thermal, however, during her time with Brigade saw that they were not the menace that they were being portrayed as and decided to destroy all the information she had been gathering. Battlestone, incensed by Boone's betrayal, pursued him and both appeared to die in an explosion. However, they both survived and Battlestone was subsequently subjected to brainwashing to make him subservient to the U.S. government again.

Before the team could address the matter of Thermal's exposé, the majority of them were killed off during the Extreme Sacrifice storyline, one of Extreme Studios' company-wide events, by the assassin called Crypt, with the exceptions of Seahawk and Lethal, who was propelled into the future. They were replaced by more recognizable characters from the Image Comics universe, including Jim Valentino's Shadowhawk and Erik Larsen and Gary Carlson's Vanguard. Seahawk acted as the team's commander, although he had effectively retired from superheroing after the deaths of his brother and teammates.

A new incarnation was brought forward in a one-shot published by Liefeld's then-new company Awesome Entertainment. This new version featured such characters as Jeff Matsuda's Kaboom and Youngblood's Badrock.

In 2010, a new volume of Brigade was released through Image Comics, which saw the original team updated and the original miniseries reimagined. The team was now formed in response to advance warning of an alien invasion. The history of the main characters has now been changed and the source of their powers stems from genetic advancements. The first issue of the new miniseries was released on 8 July 2010 with Rob Liefeld writing the story, Mark Poulton scripting, and Marat Mychaels returning on art duties. No further issues have been released since then.
