= Youngblood (comics) =

Superhero team in self-titled comic book

- Cover to Youngblood #1 (April 1992) by Rob Liefeld

Publication information
- Publisher: Megaton Comics; Extreme Studios (Image Comics); Awesome Comics; Arcade Comics; Terrific Production (IP owner only); Rip Media
- First appearance: First full story: Youngblood #1 (April 1992)
- Created by: Rob Liefeld; Hank Kanalz

In-story information
- Base(s): Pentagon
- Member(s): Badrock; Die Hard; Shaft; Chapel; Vogue; Former members: Big Brother; Brahma; Combat; Cougar; Task; Dutch; Suprema; Johnny Panic; Doc Rocket; Knightsabre; Masada; Photon; Psi-Fire; Psilence; Riptide; Sentinel; Troll; Twilight; Scion

Youngblood is a superhero team starring in their self-titled comic book series, created by writer/artist Rob Liefeld. The team made its debut as a backup feature in RAMM #1 (May 1987) before the next month appearing in the one-shot Megaton Explosion #1 (June 1987); in April 1992 Youngblood appeared in its own ongoing series as the flagship publication for Image Comics and the wider Image Universe. Youngblood was originally published by Image Comics, and later by Awesome Entertainment. Upon Rob Liefeld's return to Image Comics, it was revived in 2008, 2012, 2017, 2024 via web sales direct to consumers, and 2025 at mass comic retail. In 2019, Liefeld revealed that he has not owned the rights to Youngblood for several years.

In most of its iterations, Youngblood is a high-profile superteam sanctioned and overseen by the United States government. Youngblood's members include Shaft, a former FBI agent who uses a high-tech bow; Badrock, a teenager transformed into a living block of stone; Vogue, a Russian fashion model with purple-and-chalk-white skin; and Chapel, a government assassin.

== Publication history ==
=== Creation of the series ===
Youngblood was inspired by creator Rob Liefeld's idea that if superheroes existed in real life, they would be treated as celebrities, much the same as movie stars and athletes. The series, therefore, depicts the superhero members of Youngblood not only as they participate in adventures fighting crime and evil, but navigating the world of celebrity endorsement deals, TV show appearances, agents, managers, and the perceived pressures of celebrity life.

From 1985 to 1987, Liefeld did pinups for Megaton Comics, including one of the character Ultragirl that would see print in RAMM #1 (May 1987) and Megaton Comics Explosion #1 (June 1987), a "who's who"-type reference book featuring individual entries of characters in the style of an encyclopedia or handbook. This gave Liefeld an opportunity for his own creation, Youngblood, to see print in this form. The two-page entry featuring the team (consisting at that point of the characters Sentinel, Sonic, Brahma, Riptide, Cougar, Psi-Fire, and Photon) was the team's first appearance in print.

Two months later, the team appeared in an advertisement in Megaton #8 (August 1987) indicating that it would next appear in Megaton Special #1 by Liefeld and writer Hank Kanalz, with a cover by artist Jerry Ordway. However, Megaton Comics went out of business before that comic was printed.

Liefeld has explained that the version of Youngblood that eventually saw print in Youngblood #1 (April 1992) was based partially on his 1991 plan for a new Teen Titans series for DC Comics to be co-written with Marv Wolfman. According to Liefeld, he and managing editor Dick Giordano failed to reach an agreement on the project, and Liefeld merged his Teen Titans ideas with his previous, creator-owned Youngblood property. According to Liefeld, "Shaft was intended to be Speedy. Vogue was a new Harlequin design, Combat was a Kh'undian warrior circa the Legion of Super-Heroes, ditto for Photon and Die Hard was a S.T.A.R. Labs android. I forgot who Chapel was supposed to be, but I'm sure it would have rocked". Given the failed deal with DC and Liefeld's increasingly strained relationship with Marvel Comics over his X-Force royalties, he joined other Marvel artists to form Image Comics to publish Youngblood in their own series.

=== Original runs ===
Youngblood #1 (April 1992) was an anthology consisting of two separate stories published in flip book format: each half of the book had its own front cover and contained one story, rotated upside-down from the other half. One story featured the organisation's "Home Team", for domestic missions, consisting of Shaft, Badrock (originally named Bedrock), Chapel, Die Hard, Photon and Vogue. The other story featured the "Away Team", for international missions, consisting of Sentinel, Brahma, Combat, Cougar, Psi-Fire and Riptide.

The team's second published appearance in Megaton Comics Explosion #1 (June 1987)

A sneak preview of the series appeared in The Malibu Sun #1 (February 1992), published by Image through Malibu Comics, which provided administrative, production, distribution, and marketing support for Image's early publications. On March 13, two separate 5½" x 8½″ black-and-white ashcan editions of Youngblood began to surface, each featuring one of two separate stories from Youngblood #1. Edition "A" featured the 13-page lead story, while Edition "B" featured the other side of the flip book, along with four extra pages of art that would not be included in the premier issue. According to Image Comics spokesperson John Beck, the print run on edition "A" was 1,000 copies, and edition "B" was limited to 500 copies.

Youngblood #1 (April 1992) was the first Image Comics publication. At the time of its release, it was the highest selling independent comic book published, despite receiving poor reviews from critics for unclear storytelling due to both Liefeld's art and the book's flip format, which some readers found confusing; poor anatomy; incorrect perspective; non-existent backgrounds; poor dialogue; and the late shipping of the book, a problem that continued with subsequent issues. In an interview in Hero Illustrated #4 (October 1993), Liefeld conceded disappointment with the first four issues of Youngblood, calling the first issue a "disaster". He explained that production problems, as well as sub-par scripting by his friend and collaborator Hank Kanalz, whose employment Liefeld later terminated, resulted in work that was lower in quality than that which Liefeld produced when Fabian Nicieza scripted his plots on X-Force, and that reprints of those four issues would be re-scripted. Writer and columnist Peter David pointed to Liefeld's scapegoating of Kanalz as an example of Liefeld's failure to take responsibility for his project, and evidence that genuine collaboration with good writers like Louise Simonson and Nicieza, which some of the Image founders did not appreciate, had previously reflected better on Liefeld's art. Throughout its run at Image, Youngblood and other books published by Liefeld's Extreme Studios were attacked by critics for late issues and inconsistent quality.

Although intended for monthly publication, issues #1–3, #0 and #4–5 of Youngblood were published intermittently between April 1992 and July 1993. Four months passed between the publication of issues #3 and #0, and five months between issues #4 and #5. Ultimately, Youngblood #5 was published in flip-book format with Brigade #4 as its flip-side; Liefeld was also replaced with Chap Yaep as penciller. Various other Image Comics series were spun off or previewed in these issues: issue #0 introduced the team leader of Brigade, the story arc in issues #2–5 introduced the main characters and central premise of Prophet, and a backup story in issue #3 introduced the series Supreme.

An anthology spin-off series Youngblood: Strikefile began publication in 1993, featuring stories spotlighting various individual main characters from Youngblood. Issues #1–3 (April – August 1993) were flip books, containing three-part stories starring Die Hard and Chapel; issue #4 (October 1993) contained a single self-contained story featuring Shaft, Badrock and Die Hard. A one-shot Youngblood Yearbook (July 1993) featuring the "Away Team" was also published, effectively as an annual.

Liefeld solicited writer Kurt Busiek for Youngblood stories in 1993. Busiek wrote detailed plots for three issues and ideas for a fourth, under the proposed title Youngblood: Year One. This was never produced, but the plot lines were revived amid controversy years later.

From September 1993 a new title was launched, Team Youngblood, published monthly, pencilled by Chap Yaep. It featured what was formerly termed the "Away Team" with an altered team lineup, consisting of Sentinel, Cougar, Riptide, Photon, and new characters Dutch (owned by Yaep) and Masada. This series effectively replaced the original Youngblood title; the characters Shaft and Badrock were limited to cameos, and Chapel was added to the cast of Bloodstrike. Issues #7–8 were included in the "Extreme Prejudice" crossover event.

The original Youngblood series resumed in June 1994 from issue #6. The series was then published monthly, and strongly integrated with Team Youngblood; plot developments and characters regularly crossed back and forth between the two titles. Old characters were brought back including Shaft, Badrock, Vogue, Combat and Brahma, while new ones were introduced including Knightsabre, Troll, and trainee recruits Task and Psilence. Youngblood issue #9 was an out-of-continuity story written and pencilled by Jim Valentino as part of "Image X Month", where creators swapped titles. The original volume of Youngblood ended with issue #10 in December 1994, having been delayed. Youngblood: Strikefile also resumed publication in July 1994 from issue #5, now also published monthly; it ended with issue #11.

The January 1995 crossover event "Extreme Sacrifice" incorporated Team Youngblood #17 as "Part 6 of 8", and afterward included Youngblood: Strikefile #11 (February 1995) as "Part 0 of 8" for its main story featuring Chapel. Team Youngblood then ran for issues #18–20 (May – July 1995), ahead of a relaunch of the Youngblood title with a new issue #1 (September 1995).

The second Youngblood volume included many crossovers with other comics published by Image. Issue #3 (November 1995) crossed over with Glory in a two-part story. The January 1996 nine-part crossover event "Extreme Destroyer" included Youngblood #4. The "Rage of Angels" (March 1996) crossover included Youngblood #6 and also issue #21 of a revived Team Youngblood; the "ShadowHunt" crossover (April 1996) included Youngblood #7 and Team Youngblood #22, the latter series' final issue. Following issue #10, Youngblood crossed over with the Marvel Comics series X-Force (also created by Liefeld) in one of the several inter-company crossover one-shot stories Image Comics would do with Marvel over the course of the 1990s; the two-part story consisted of issues titled Youngblood/X-Force (July 1996) and X-Force/Youngblood (August 1996).

In September 1996, Liefeld had a falling out with his Image partners, forcing him to leave the company. Liefeld retained the creative rights to Youngblood; however, the series was put on hiatus. In December 1996, Youngblood #14 was published by Liefeld's company Maximum Press. Its story picked up directly after #10, and no issues #11-13 were ever published. The ongoing story arc was intended to conclude with an issue #15, which was solicited but never released.

=== Alan Moore ===
In 1997, Liefeld hired Alan Moore to relaunch and revamp Youngblood. Moore's run on the title began with a mini-series entitled Judgment Day, which revolved around the mysterious murder of Youngblood member Riptide, the subsequent "super-trial" of teammate Knightsabre, and the all-powerful Book of All Stories which dictates the order of the universe.

Moore created a new, teenaged Youngblood group that was financed independently by millionaire Waxey Doyle, formerly the WWII superhero Waxman. The team was led by Shaft and was augmented by new members Big Brother, Doc Rocket, Twilight, Suprema, and Johnny Panic. Moore said he wanted Youngblood to be a "less sprawling, more dynamic team" and that "if you have more characters than [six], the action gets cluttered and it becomes increasingly difficult to establish each character as a real and solid person in their own right". All of the new team members and most of the villains featured in this series, including Jack-A-Dandy, were Moore's creations.

However, despite Moore's plans for at least 12 issues of his new Youngblood, only three issues were ever printed; the third issue was published in another book called Awesome Adventures. The team also appeared in a short story in the Awesome Christmas Special where Shaft's journal provides the narration as the new team comes together.

Moore's rough outline for the series was published in Alan Moore's Awesome Handbook and included a budding relationship between Big Brother and Suprema, a giant planet-devouring entity called "The Goat", Shaft's fruitless crush on Twilight, and the revelation that Johnny Panic was the biological son of Supreme villain Darius Dax. In the Handbook, Moore also reveals that he intentionally chose the team members for their connections to various points and significant characters in the Awesome Universe's superhero history, noting this as the case in the 1980s launch of The New Teen Titans.

=== Youngblood: Genesis ===
In 2000, Liefeld began soliciting orders for Youngblood: Genesis, using Kurt Busiek's unused Year One plots. Busiek asked that he only be credited with providing the plots for this new series. He was listed as plotter on the comic book itself when it came out years later, but when Liefeld advertised the comic through Diamond Previews "as written by Kurt Busiek", Busiek accused him of not honoring their agreement and eventually asked that his fans not buy the series.

Youngblood: Genesis officially ended after two issues, as the third and fourth issues would have used Image Comics characters for which Liefeld did not have the appropriate permissions. According to Liefeld: "I have the original issues #3 and #4 that Kurt wrote, [but] they can't be produced as is simply from the standpoint that they heavily feature prominent supporting cast members from Spawn and Wildcats, as well as John Lynch from Gen^{13} and Team 7".

=== 2004–present ===
A number of projects were announced in 2003 including reprinting older material and providing the art for two Youngblood series. The two new comic books involved Mark Millar writing new issues of Youngblood: Bloodsport and Youngblood: Genesis written by Brandon Thomas. However, only one issue of the Youngblood: Bloodsport was published, but in June 2008, Liefeld announced that issue #2 would appear in September.

In 2004, Robert Kirkman began writing a new series, Youngblood: Imperial, with artist Marat Mychaels but left after one issue due to his busy schedule. Fabian Nicieza was slated to take over.

In 2005, Liefeld announced that Joe Casey would be re-assembling and re-scripting the original Youngblood mini-series into a more coherent and sophisticated story to be titled Maximum Youngblood. On July 12, 2007, it was announced that Liefeld would return to Image Comics to publish a collected "definitive version" of Maximum Youngblood with a new ending written by Joe Casey, illustrated by Liefeld himself. This was followed in January 2008 by a new ongoing series (Youngblood Volume 4) written by Casey and illustrated by Derec Donovan, with covers by Liefeld. Liefeld was slated to begin writing and art duties on Youngblood beginning in May 2009. No new issues have come out since then, with Youngblood Volume 4 ending with only nine issues and issue #9 focusing only on the backup stories plot.

In late 2011, it was announced that screenwriter John McLaughlin would write a revival of Youngblood with artist Jon Malin and series creator Rob Liefeld for a May 2012 release, starting with Youngblood #71, as the series reverts to its original legacy numbering. The series ran for 8 issues, concluding with #78 in July 2013.

For the 25th anniversary of both Youngblood and Image Comics, in May 2017 a new ongoing series (Youngblood Volume 5) was launched, written by Chad Bowers with art by Jim Towe. It lasted 11 issues, a 12th issue was solicited but never published.

In August 2019, Liefeld revealed that he has not owned the rights of Youngblood since the late 1990s, and that they are currently owned by Andrew Rev of Terrific Production LLC.

In October 2024, it was announced Liefeld would be returning to write and illustrate a new YoungBlood series beginning in 2025. It was also revealed that Liefeld would reunite with Scott Mitchell Rosenberg for more YoungBlood related projects including "a Youngblood Vault Edition representing high resolution scans of the original art from the first Youngblood series in a deluxe oversized hardcover, as well as a Facsimile Edition of Youngblood #1 to mark the title’s 33rd anniversary in April 2025, both to be published by Image Comics."

== Fictional team history ==
In the 1980s, American politician Alexander Graves created Youngblood as a team of genetically-enhanced superpowered humans with the intention to forge the team into his own personal weapon—Graves was later revealed to be Lucifer. (Note: Not to be confused with Lucifer from Image Comics' The Wicked + The Divine)

Youngblood's members include Shaft, Badrock, Vogue, and Chapel.

== Reaction and impact ==
As Youngblood #1 is the comic book that introduced Image Comics, it is ranked #19 on Comic Book Resources's 2008 chronological list of the 20 Most Significant Comics. According to CBR's Steven Grant, this status is derived not so much from the comic's content, but for triggering both the 1990s speculator boom and bust and the trend towards the creation of superhero universes among various publishers. The series, and the formation of Image itself, is credited with discouraging publishers' emphasis on their creative talent in their marketing decisions.

== In other media ==
=== Animated series ===
In Autumn of 1993, Rob Liefeld's Extreme Studios and newly formed animation studio Roustabout Productions entered into a partnership to jointly produce a Youngblood animated series after Roustabout refused a work for hire and insisting on sharing ownership, profits, and physical materials such the cels and master tapes. Initially, Liefeld and Roustabout developed the series for CBS a minute long short storyboarded by Liefeld himself and a longer three minute short directed by Kamoon Song and produced Korean animation studio A-1 Studios. Liefeld himself broke off negotiations with CBS due to the changes the network wanted, taking executive action as he was the principle investor with $800,000 of his own money. The schism between CBS and Liefeld came about due to CBS wanting to have the series refer to "guns" as "blasters", reducing the size of the "blasters", and requesting a less revealing outfit for the character of Riptide, all of which Liefeld steadfastly refused. In May 1994, it was reported that Liefeld and Roustabout had pivoted away from an animated TV series for network television in favor of a direct-to-video project as to not deal with censorship and executive mandates. Liefeld stated in hindsight it was a mistake to even consider CBS given what he perceived as their bungled handling of other comic based series like Fish Police, the 1990 The Flash TV series, or Cadillacs and Dinosaurs. With the decision to go direct-to video, the producers voiced hopes they could channel the animation style of Akira, Heavy Metal, or Battle Angel into the final result. Later that same month however, Liefeld filed a lawsuit in Los Angeles County Superior Court against Roustabout claiming ownership of over 2,000 animation cels and master tapes from the Youngblood footage that has been made thus far by Roustabout. Liefeld's claims against Roustabout were rejected by the court in June of that year. Liefeld's Extreme Studios issued a press release claiming the agreement between himself and Roustabout was that himself and Extreme had commissioned the production of the promotional shorts and were therefore the rightful owners of the masters and cels. According to Roustabout, this violated an informal agreement between themselves and Liefeld wherein neither side would release a press release in order to keep proceedings civil and responded with their own press release saying Liefeld convinced the company to produce the animation at cost in favor of partnership in the cancelled animated series, and when the deal with CBS fell through Liefeld pretended the deal never existed which Roustabout claimed was contradicted by the earlier press release from Extreme Studios announcing their partnership. In August, Roustabout filed a Countersuit against Liefeld for compensatory and punitive damages for breach of contract, fraud, constructive fraud, and unfair competition. Liefeld furthered added to Roustabout's vexation when he used the animated footage for promotional purposes at that year's San Diego Comic-Con and cut out the ending credit to Roustabout Animation. Roustabout accused Liefeld of employing the same work-for-hire practices he himself had criticized in the comic book industry.

Despite the legal turmoil with Roustabout, Liefeld intended to push forward with a half-hour Youngblood animated series was planned for the 1995–96 season on Fox as part of an hour block with a proposed Cyberforce series. The series was being developed by Liefeld in conjunction with A-1 Studios who were carried over from the abandoned CBS and Roustabout iteration. According to Nick Dubois, creative director and co-founder of Roustabout, the series would take a lighthearted approach with tongue-in-cheek humor. Robert N. Skir and Marty Isenberg were enlisted to write both a pilot script and series bible. A clip was created but the series was never produced. The clip aired in commercials for Youngblood action figures.

Fox and Liefeld had also considered a live-action show based around the character Badrock utilizing animatronic costumes.

=== Video game ===
A Youngblood video game, an isometric action game similar to Crusader: No Remorse but incorporating RPG elements such as experience points and character stats, was in development by Realtime Associates for the PlayStation and PC in 1997, with GT Interactive as the publisher. It was never released.

=== Film ===
In 2009, Reliance Entertainment acquired the feature film rights to the comic book, reportedly for a mid-six figures, with Brett Ratner attached to direct.

== Collected editions ==
A number of the comic books have been collected into trade paperbacks:

- Youngblood TPB (collects Youngblood Volume 1, #1–4; 96 pages; 1993 Previews Exclusive Edition)
- Youngblood: Baptism of Fire TPB (collects Youngblood Volume 1, #6–8 and 10, Team Youngblood #9–11, and the Troll story from Image Comics Zero; Image Comics; 1996)
- Youngblood, Volume 1 (collects Youngblood Volume 1, #0–10; remastered as Maximum Edition, 168 pages, Image Comics, hardcover, December 2008, ISBN 1-58240-858-0)
- Youngblood, Volume 1: Focus Tested (collects Youngblood Volume 4, #1–4; includes introduction by Robert Kirkman, plus interviews with Joe Casey and Rob Liefeld; 104 pages, Image Comics, September 2008, ISBN 1-58240-945-5)
- Youngblood, Volume 2: Voted Off the Island (collects Youngblood Volume 4, #5–9; 128 pages, Image Comics, November 2008, ISBN 1-60706-003-5)

== See also ==
- Pitt – a character appearing in Youngblood #4 (February 1993)
