= List of Image Comics publications =

Image Comics is an American comic book publisher. These are the ongoing and limited series publications it has released under its own brand and imprints such as Todd McFarlane Productions, Desperado Publishing, Beckett Comics, and Top Cow Productions.

== Titles ==
=== 0–9 ===
- 10th Muse (2000–2001; issues 1–9)
- 13 Chambers (2008; by mink and Denis Medri)
- The 13th Artifact (2016; by Amit Chauhan)
- 1963 (1993)
- 1st Man (1997; one-shot)
- 20XX (2019–present)
- 20th Century Men (2022-2023)
- 21 (1996)
- 24Seven (2006–2007; anthology, edited by Ivan Brandon)
- 3 Floyds: Alpha King (2015; by Brian Azzarello and Nick Floyd)
- 39 Minutes (2016; by William Harms)
- 4-Fisted Adventures of Tug and Buster (1998; one-shot)
- 40 Oz. Collected TPB (1998; one-shot)
- 50 Girls 50 (2001; 4-issue mini-series)
- '68 (2006, 2011 by Mark Kidwell, Nat Jones and Jay Fotos)
- 76 (2008–2009; 5-issue mini-series)
- 81SEAVEN (2026)
- 86 Volta Dead Girl (2005; one-shot)
- 8house (2016; by Brandon Graham)

=== A ===
- A Man Among Ye
- A.D.: After Death (2017)
- The Activity (2012-2014)
- Adrenalynn: Weapon of War (1999–2000)
- Adrift (2015)
- Adventures in the Rifle Brigade (2000)
- Afar (2017)
- Age of Bronze (1998–2010)
- Airboy (2016)
- Alex + Ada (2013–2015)
- Alien Pig Farm 3000 (2007; by writer Todd Farmer/Steve Niles/Thomas Jane and art by Donald Marquez)
- Allegra (1996)
- All Against All (2022-Present) - Will medias Spiritual Successor to Others Titles.
- Alley Cat (1999–2000)
- Almighty (2022–present)
- The Alliance (1995)
- Alpha Girl (2012)
- Alter Nation (2004)
- Altered Image (1998)
- The Amazing Joy Buzzards (2005)
  - The Amazing Joy Buzzards vol. 2 (2005–2006)
- Amber Atoms (2009)
- American Flagg (2013)
- American Jesus (2009)
- American Legends (2014)
- The Amory Wars (2007–2008)
  - The Amory Wars vol. 2 (2008)
- Analog (2018-2020)
- Angela (1994–1995)
- Ant vol. 2 (2005–2007; previous volume from Arcana Studio)
- Aqua Leung (2008; by Mark Andrew Smith and Paul Maybury, ISBN 1-58240-863-7)
- Arcanum (1997–1998)
- Area 52 (2001)
- Aria (1999)
- Ascend (2004; by Keith Arem and Christopher Shy; TPB: ISBN 1-58240-430-5; Hardcover: ISBN 1-58240-518-2; reprinted as Special Edition by IDW Publishing)
- Assorted Crisis Events (2025-)
- Assassin Nation (2019)
- The Astounding Wolf-Man (2007–2010)
- Astro City (1995–1996; by Kurt Busiek)
  - Astro City vol. 2 (1996–2000)
- The Atheist (2005–2007)
- Athena Inc. (2001)
- The Autumnlands (2015-2017)
- Awakening (1997–1998)
- Avigon (2000) (also known as Avigon: Gods And Demons, re-released in 2005.)

=== B ===
- Back to Brooklyn (2008-2009)
- Backlash #1–32 (November 1994–May 1997)
- Backlash/Spider-Man #1–2 (July–October 1996; co-published with Marvel Comics)
- Bad Dog (2009-2014)
- Bad Ideas (2004)
- Bad Planet (2005-2008)
- Badger (1997-1998)
- Badrock and Company #1–6 (September 1994-1995)
  - Badrock (1995-1996)
- Badrock/Wolverine #1 (June 1996; co-published with Marvel Comics)
- Bastard Samurai (2002)
- Battle Chasers (1998-2001)
- Battle Hymn (2004–2005)
- Battle of the Planets (2002-2003)
  - Battle of the Planets: Coup de Gras (2005)
- Battle Pope vol. 2 (2005–2007; previous volume from Funk-o-Tron)
- Battlestar Galactica
- Battlestone (1994)
- The Beauty (2015–)
- Bedlam (2012–2014)
- Beef (February 2018 – June 2018; five-issue miniseries)
- Berserker (2009-2010)
- Beyond Avalon (2005)
- Big Bang Comics (1996-2001; previous volume from Caliber Comics)
- Big Bruisers (1996; one-shot)
- Big Game (2023; 5-issue mini-series)
- Big Hair Productions (2000)
- Bingo Love
- Birthright (2014–2021)
- Bitch Planet (2014–)
- Bitter Root (2018–)
- Black and White (1994; 3-issue mini-series)
  - Black & White (1996, one-shot)
- Black Cloud (2017-2018)
- Black Flag (1994; one-shot)
- The Black Forest (2004; one-shot)
- Black Magick (2015–)
- Black Mist (2007, 2-issue mini-series, reprint of the Caliber Comics series)
- Black Monday Murders (2016–)
- Black Ops (1996, 5-issue mini-series)
- Black Road (2016-2017)
- Black Science (2013–2019)
- Black Tide (2001-2002)
- Blacklight (2005)
- Blair Witch: Dark Testaments (2000; one-shot)
- Blindside (1996; one-shot)
- Bliss Alley (1997)
- Blood Legacy (2000)
  - Blood Legacy: The Young Ones (2003; one-shot)
- Blood River (2005)
- Blood Stain (2016-2017)
- Blood Stained Teeth (2022–present)
- Bloodhunter (1996; one-shot)
- Bloodpool (1995; 4-issue mini-series)
- Bloodstream (2004; 4-issue mini-series)
- Bloodstrike (1993-1994; 2012)
- Bloodwulf (1995)
- Blue (1999-2000)
- Body Bags(2005)
- Bodycount (1996; 4-issue mini-series)
- Bohos (1998)
- Bolero (2022)
- Bomb Queen
  - Bomb Queen: WMD: Woman of Mass Destruction
  - Bomb Queen 2: Dirty Bomb: The Queen of Hearts
  - Bomb Queen 3: Bombshell: The Good, The Bad & The Lovely
  - Bomb Queen 4: Suicide Bomber
  - Bomb Queen 5: Bombastic: The Divine Comedy
  - Bomb Queen 6: Time Bomb: Countdown to Armageddon
  - Bomb Queen 7: End of Hope: The Day the Heroes Died
  - Bomb Queen 8: Ultimate Bomb: Trump Card
- Bonds (2007-2009)
- Bone (1996-1999)
- Bonerest (2005–2006)
- Boof (1994)
- Boof and the Bruise Crew (1994)
- Book of Shadows (2006)
- Brass (1996-1997; 2000-2001)
- Brawl (2007)
- Brigade (1992-1995)
- Brit (2007–2009)
  - Brit Vol. 1: Old Soldier
  - Brit Vol. 2: AWOL
  - Brit Vol. 3: Fubar
- Broken Trinity (2008)
- Brother Bedlam (2006; one-shot)
- Bulletproof Coffin (2010)
  - Bulletproof Coffin: Disinterred (2012)
- Bulletproof Monk (1998–1999)
- Bunker
- Burglar Bill vol. 2 (2004–2005)
- Burnouts
- Butcher Knight (2000-2001; 4-issue mini-series)

=== C ===
- C-23 (1998; 9-issue series)
- Carbon Grey (2011–present)
- Casanova (2006–2008)
- Celestine (1996; 2-issue mini-series)
- Channel Zero (1998; 5-issue mini-series)
- Chapel (1995-1996; 2-issue mini-series followed by 7-issue series)
- Chassis (1999-2000; 5-issue mini-series; previous volumes from Millennium Publications and Hurricane Comics)
- Chew (2009-2016)
  - Chew Vol. 1: Taster's Choice
  - Chew Vol. 2: International Flavor
  - Chew Vol. 3: Just Desserts
  - Chew Vol. 4: Flambé
  - Chew Vol. 5: Major League Chew
  - Chew Vol. 6: Space Cakes
  - Chew Vol. 7: Bad Apples
  - Chew Vol. 8: Family Recipes
  - Chew Vol. 9: Chicken Tenders
  - Chew Vol. 10: Blood Puddin'
  - Chew Vol. 11: The Last Suppers
  - Chew Vol. 12: Sour Grapes
  - Chu (2020–2021; on hiatus)
    - Chu Vol. 1: First Course
    - Chu Vol. 2: (She) Drunk History
- Choker (2010-2012)
- Cholly and Flytrap (2004-2005; 4-issue mini-series)
- Chrononauts (2015; 4-issue mini-series)
  - Chrononauts: FutureShock (2019; 4-issue mini-series)
- The Circle (2007-2008)
- City of Heroes vol. 2 (2005–2007; previous volume from Blue King Studios)
- City of Silence (2000; 3-issue mini-series)
- The Clock Maker (2003; 4-issue mini-series)
- Cloudburst (2004; OGN)
- Codeflesh (2009; one-shot)
- Comic Book Tattoo (2008; anthology)
- Compass Zero
- Copperhead (2014–2018)
- The Creech (1997)
- Creed
- Crimson (1998-2001)
- The Cross Bronx (2006)
- Crossover (2020-2022; on hiatus)
- Crosswind (2017–2018; 6-issue mini-series)
- The Crow (1999)
- Crowded (2018–)
- Crypt (1995; 2-issue mini-series)
- Curse Words (2017–2019)
- Cursed (2003-2004; 4-issue mini-series)
- Clementine (2022)
- Cyberforce
- Cybernary (1995-1996; 5-issue mini-series)
- Cyberpunx (1996; one-shot)

=== D ===
- Damned (1997; 4-issue mini-series)
- Danger Girl (1998-2011; further volumes published by IDW Publishing)
- Darkchylde (1996-1998)
- Darker Image (1993; one-shot)
- Darkminds (2000-2001)
- Dart (1996; 3-issue mini-series)
- David and Goliath (2003-2004; 3-issue mini-series)
- Dawn: Three Tiers (2003-2005; 6-issue mini-series; previous volumes published by Sirius Entertainment)
- Days Of Hate (2018; 12-issue maxi-series)
- Dead Ahead(2008-2010; 3-issue mini-series)
- Dead Body Road (2013-2014; 6-issue mini-series)
  - Dead Body Road: Bad Blood (2020; 6-issue mini-series)
- The Dead Lucky (2022-)
- Dead Space (2008; 6-issue mini-series)
- Deadly Class (2013–)
- Deadworld vol. 3 (2005–2006; previous volumes from Caliber Press)
- Death Dealer (2007-2008; 6-issue mini-series)
- Death Jr. (2005; 3-issue mini-series)
  - Death Jr. Vol. 2 (2006; 3-issue mini-series)
- Death or Glory (2018–2020, by Rick Remender and Bengal)
- Deathblow (1993-1996)
  - Deathblow Vol. 2 (2006-2008; published by Wildstorm Comics)
- Deathblow and Wolverine #1–2 (September 1996–January 1997; co-published with Marvel Comics)
- Demonslayer (1998–2000)
- Deep Sleeper (2004; 4-issue mini-series, first two issues originally published by Oni Press)
- Defcon 4 (1996; 4-issue mini-series)
- Defiance (2002-2003)
- Deity: Revelations (1999; 4-issue mini-series)
- The Department of Truth (2020–present)
- Descender (2015–2018)
  - Ascender (2019-)
- Desperate Times (1998; 4-issue mini-series)
  - Desperate Times (2004; 2-issue mini-series)
- The Detonator (2004–2005; by Mike Baron)
- Die (2018–2021)
- A Distant Soil (1996-; Reprints of Aria Press material for issues 1-14; new material from issue 15)
- Divine Right (1997-1999)
- Doom's IV (1994)
- Drain (2006-2008)
- Dream Police
- Drifter (2014–2017)
- The Drowned (2004; graphic novel)
- Drums (2011; 4-issue mini-series)
- Dust (2007; 2-issue mini-series)
  - Dust Wars (2010; 3-issue mini-series)
- Dusty Star (1997; 2-issue mini-series)
- DV8 (1996-1999)
- Dynamo 5 (2007–2009)

=== E ===
- East of West (2013–2019)
- Eclipse (2017–2019)
- Elephantmen (2006–2018)
- Elsewhere (2017–2018)
- Empty Zone (2015-2016)
- Enormous (2012; one-shot; continued, 2022, 2023 by 215 Ink Publishing)
- Escape (2025–)
- Eternal Empire (2017–2018)
- The Expatriate (2005–2006)
- Extreme Sacrifice (1995)
- Extremity (2017–2018)

=== F ===
- Faction Paradox (2003; 2-issue mini-series)
- The Fade Out (2014–2016)
- Fairlady (2019; 5-issue mini-series)
- Fall Out Toy Works (2009–2010)
- Family Tree (2020-)
- Farmhand, by Taylor Wells and Rob Guillory (2018–)
- Fatale (2012-2014)
- Fear Agent (2005–2010)
- Fearless (2007-2008; 4-issue mini-series)
- Feather (2003-2004; 5-issue mini-series)
- Fell (2005–2008)
- Ferro City (2005)
- Feral (2024–)
- Fireborn (2026–)
- Fire From Heaven (1996)
- Fire Power (2020-)
- Firebreather (2003; 4-issue mini-series)
  - Firebreather Vol. 2 (2008-2009; 4-issue mini-series)
- Firebug (2018)
- Five Ghosts (2013–2015)
- The Fix (2016–2018)
- Flaming Carrot Comics (2004–2005)
- Flavor (2018; 6-issue mini-series)
- Flawed (2022–2023; 6-issue mini-series)
- Forever Amber (1999; 4-issue mini-series)
- Four Eyes (2008-2010)
  - Four Eyes: Hearts of Fire (2016)
- Four Letter Worlds (2005; anthology)
- Frankenstein Mobster (2003-2004)
- Freddie the Fix (2024)
- Freedom Force (2005; 6-issue mini-series)
- Free Planet (2025–)
- Freshmen (2005–2006)
- From Under Mountains (2015-2016; 6-issue mini-series)
- Frontiersman (2021-2022; 5-issue mini-series, plus Lockup one-shot)

=== G ===
- G.I. Joe
- G-Man
- Gear Station
- Geeksville
- Gen^{13}
- Gen^{13}/Generation X #1 (July 1997; co-published with Marvel Comics)
- Gen^{13}/Monkeyman and O'Brien #1–2 (June–August 1998; co-published with Dark Horse Comics)
- Gen^{13}/The Maxx #1 (December 1995)
- Generation X/Gen^{13} #1 (December 1997; co-published with Mavel Comics)
- Genius
- Get Naked (Great was Utopian Nudist Comic)
- Ghost Spy
- Ghosted
- The Gift (2004–2006; previously published by Raven Publications)
- Girls (2005–2007)
- Gladstone's School for World Conquerors
- Glitter Bomb (2016–2017)
  - Glitter Bomb: The Fame Game (2017–2018)
- Go Girl!
- God Complex (2009–2010)
- God Country (2017)
- God Hates Astronauts (2014–2015)
- Gødland (2005-2012)
- Gravepoint & Spawn (2026)
- The Gray Area
- Grease Monkey
- Great Pacific
- Green Valley (2016–2017)
- Grifter/Badrock #1–2 (October–November 1995)
- Groo the Wanderer
- Grounded (2005–2006)
- Grrl Scouts: Work Sucks
- Guerillas
- GunCandy (2005–2006)

=== H ===
- Hack/Slash
  - Hack/Slash: Back to School #1–4 (October 2023 – April 2024)
  - Hack/Slash: Body Bags #1–4 (October 2024 – April 2025)
  - [Hack/Slash: Hot Shorts]] (October 2022)
  - Hack/Slash: Kill Your Idols #1–4 (March 2024)
  - Hack/Slash: Me Without You (January 2011)
  - Hack/Slash: My First Maniac (June – September 2010)
  - Hack/Slash: Resurrection #1–12 (October 2017 – October 2018)
  - Hack/Slash: Son of Samhain #1–5 (July – November 2014)
  - Hack/Slash: Trailers — Part Two (November 2010)
  - Hatchet/Slash (November 2011)
- Hadrian's Wall #1–8 (September 2016 – August 2017)
- Haha #1–6 (January – June 2021)
- Halcyon #1–5 (November 2010 – May 2011)
- Happy! (see Grant Morrison bibliography#Other US publishers)
- Harvest #1–4 (August 2012 – January 2013)
- Hatter M: The Looking Glass Wars #1–4 (December 2005 – November 2006)
- Haunt
- Haunt You to the End #1–4 (June – October 2023)
- Haunted Girl #1–4 (October 2023 – February 2024)
- Hawaiian Dick #1–3 (December 2002 – February 2003)
  - Hawaiian Dick: Screaming Black Thunder #1–5 (November 2007 – October 2008)
  - Hawaiian Dick: The Last Resort #1–4 (August 2004 – June 2006)
- Hazard #1–5 (June – November 1996)
- Hazed
- Head Lopper #1–16 (September 2015 – July 2021)
- Heirs of Eternity
- Hellcop
- Hellhole #1–3 (July 1999 – 2000)
- Hellshock
- Hellspawn
- Hero Camp #1–4 (May – August 2005)
- Hip Flask
- Hoax Hunters #0–13 (March 2012 – January 2014)
  - Hoax Hunters: Case Files (June 2013)
- Home #1–5 (April – August 2021)
- Home Sick Pilots #1–15 (December 2020 – June 2025)
- Hong on the Range #1–3 (December 1997 – February 1998)
- Horizon #1–18 (July 2016 – February 2018)
- The Horror Book
- Huck vol. 1 #1–6 (November 2015 – April 2016)
- Humankind
- The Humans (2015) – a spiritual successor to the Planet of the Apes comic series
- Hunter-Killer (2005–2007)
- Hyperkinetic #1–3 (July – October 2008)
- Hysteria: One Man Gang #1–2 (March – April 2006)

=== I ===
- I Hate Fairyland
  - I Hate Fairyland: Madly Ever After
  - I Hate Fairyland: Fluff My Life
  - I Hate Fairyland: Good Girl
  - I Hate Fairyland: Sadly Never After
  - I Hate Fairyland: Gert's Inferno
  - Last Gert Standing
  - I Hate Fairyland: Untold Tales
  - I Hate Fairyland: In the Mean Time
  - I Hate Fairyland: Happy End Game
  - I Hate Fairyland: Back On My Bull Ship
  - I Hate Fairyland: Monsters Gonna Monster
- I Hate Gallant Girl #1–3 (November 2008 – January 2009)
- I Hate This Place
- I Kill Giants
- I Love Trouble #1–6 (December 2012 – August 2013)
- Ice Cream Man (2018-)
- Image+ (2016-2018)
- Image! (2022-)
- The Imaginaries (2005)
- Immortal II
- Infidel #1–5 (March – July 2018)
- Infinite Dark
- Intimidators
- Intrigue #1–3 (August 1999 – February 2000)
- Invincible (2003–2018)
  - Invincible Presents: Atom Eve & Rex Splode
  - Invincible Returns
  - Invincible Universe
  - Invincible Universe: Battle Beast
  - Invincible Universe: Capes
- Invisible Republic (2015–)
- The Iron Ghost (2005–2006)
- Iron Wings
- Isis (2002; one-shot)

=== J ===
- Jack Kirby's Silver Star
- Jack Staff (2003–2009)
- Jade Warriors (1999), #1–3
- Jersey Gods
- Jinx
- JLA/WildC.A.T.s #1 (September 1997; co-published with DC Comics)
- Journeyman
- J.U.D.G.E.
- Jupiter's Legacy (Volume 1, 2015; Volume 2, 2017)

=== K ===
- Kabuki
- Karmen (2021)
- Kid Supreme
- Kill All Parents
- Kill the Minotaur (2017–)
- Killadelphia (2019-)
- Kill or Be Killed (2016–2018)
- Kin
- Kingsman Vol. 2: The Red Diamond (2017–2018)
- Kingdom City
- Kiss: Psycho Circus
- Knightmare
- Kore

=== L ===
- Lady Pendragon
- Lady Rawhide
- The Last Christmas
- Last Shot
- Lazarus (2013-)
- Leave It to Chance
- Legacy
- Legend of Supreme
- Liberty Meadows (2002–2006)
- The Light (2010)
- The Li'l Depressed Boy
- Limbo (2015–2016)
- Lions, Tigers and Bears
- Liquid City
- Little Bird (2019)
- Little Monsters (2022-)
- Little Red Hot
- Loaded Bible
- Lost Soldiers
- Love Everlasting
- Lovesick (2022-)
- Low
- Lucha Libre
- Lullaby: Wisdom Seeker
- Luther Strode

=== M ===
- M. Rex
- Madman Atomic Comics (beginning April 2007)
- Maestros (2017–)
- Mage
- The Magic Order
- Man-Eaters by Chelsea Cain and Kate Niemczyk
- The Manhattan Projects
- Manifest Destiny (2013–2022)
- Mars Attacks Image #1–4 (December 1996–April 1997)
- The Mask of Zorro #1–4 (August 1998–January 1999)
- Masters of the Universe
- Maximage
- The Maxx
- Mayhem!
- Mech Destroyer
- Megaton Man
- Meltdown
- The Mice Templar
- Micronauts
- Middlewest (2018–)
- Mirka Andolfo's Sweet Paprika (2021–present)
- Misplaced
- Monkey Meat (2022)
- Moonshine
- Monstress by Marjorie Liu and Sana Takeda (2015–)
- Moonstruck by Grace Ellis and Shae Beagle (2017–)
- Mora (2005)
- More Than Mortal: Otherworlds
- Morning Glories
- Motor Crush (2016–)
- MPH
- Murder Falcon (2018-)
- Mutant Earth
- Mythstalkers

=== N ===
- Nailbiter
- Nash (1999)
- Near Death (2011)
- Nemesis Vol. 2: Reloaded (2023; 5-issue mini-series)
- The New Brighton Archeological Society (2009)
- New Masters (2022)
- New Men
- The Next Issue Project
- Night Club
  - Night Club 2
- Night World (2014; 10-issue miniseries)
- Nights (2023–)
- No Place Like Home
- Noble Causes (2002)
  - Noble Causes Vol. 1: In Sickness and in Health
  - Noble Causes Vol. 2: Family Secrets
  - Noble Causes Vol. 3: Distant Relatives
- Noble Causes (vol. 2 2004–2009)
  - Noble Causes Vol. 4: Blood and Water
  - Noble Causes Vol. 5: Betrayals
  - Noble Causes Vol. 6: Hidden Agendas
  - Noble Causes Vol. 7: Powerless
  - Noble Causes Vol. 8: Star Crossed
  - Noble Causes Vol. 9: Five Years Later
  - Noble Causes Vol. 10: Ever After
- Nonplayer
- Nowhere Men
- NYC Mech
- NYC Mech: Beta Love (2005)

=== O ===
- Obergeist
- Oblivion Song
- Occult Crimes Taskforce
- Oliver (2019–)
- Olympus
- Orc Stain
- Ordinary Gods (2021-)
- The Others
- Outcast
- Outlaw Territory

=== P ===
- Paper Girls (2015–2019)
- Paradigm (September 2002 – November 2003)
- Pax Romana (December 2007 – November 2008)
- Peter Panzerfaust (February 2013 – December 2016)
- Phantom Force
- Phantom Guard
- Phantom Jack
- Phonogram (August 2006 – January 2016)
- PigTale
- The Pirates of Coney Island
- PITT
- Plastic
- Planetoid
- Plush (2022–present)
- Point of Impact
- Popgun (October 2012 – January 2013)
- The Portent
- Post Americana (2021) as spiritual successor to Crossed and others.
- Power Rangers: Zeo
- Powers (April 2000–)
- Pretty Deadly (2013–)
- Prism Stalker (2018–)
- The Private Eye (March 2013–)
- Prodigy
- Prodigy. The Icarus Society
- Proof (October 2007 – 2010)
- Prophet
- PvP vol. 2 (2003–2010)

=== R ===
- Radiant Black (2021–)
- Radiant Red (2022)
- Radiant Pink (2022–2023)
- Rain Like Hammers (2021)
- Random Acts of Violence (2010)
- Rasputin (2014–2016)
- Rat Queens (2013)
- The Realm (2017–)
- Redlands (2017–)
- Redneck (2017–)
- Reed Gunther (2011)
- Regulators (1995)
- Renato Jones (2017)
- Repo (2007)
- Revenge (2014)
- Revival (2013–2017)
- Revolvers (2022–present)
- Rex Mundi (2002–2006)
- Riptide
- Rising Stars: Voices of the Dead (2005)
- Rocketo: Journey to the Hidden Sea (2005–2006)
- Rook Exodus (2024–)
- Rose (2017–)
- Rotogin: Junkbotz
- Rogue Sun (2022–)
- Rumble (2014–)
- Runes of Ragnan

=== S ===
- The Safest Place
- Saga
- Satellite Sam
- Savage Dragon
  - The Savage Dragon/Destroyer Duck #1 (November 1996)
  - The Savage Dragon/Marshall Law #1–2 (July–August 1997)
  - The Savage Dragon vs The Savage Megaton Man #1 (March 1993)
  - Savage Dragon: Wanted!
  - Savage Dragon: Welcome to San Francisco
- Savant Garde
- Screamland
- Scud: The Disposable Assassin
- The Scumbag
- Sea of Red (2005–2006)
- Sea of Stars (2019–)
- Season of the Witch (2005–2006)
- Second Chances
- The Second Stage Turbine Blade
- Seven to Eternity (2016–)
- Severed
- Sex Criminals (2013–2020)
- SFSX (Safe Sex) (2019–2021)
- Shadowhawk
- Shadows
- Shaman's Tears
- Ship of Fools
- Shutter
- Sidekick
- Sins of the Black Flamingo
- Siren
- Skullkickers
- Skyward (2018–)
- Sleepless
- Slots (2017–)
- Small Gods (2004–2005)
- Snotgirl (2016–)
- SOCOM: SEAL Team Seven
- Sonata (2019–)
- Sons of the Devil
- Sorrow
- Soul Kiss
- Southern Bastards (2014–)
- Southern Cross (2015–)
- Spawn
  - Spawn/Batman #1 (1994)
- Spider-Man/Gen^{13} #1 (November 1996; co-published with Marvel Comics)
- Spread (2014–)
- Stardust Kid (2005)
- Starlight (2014)
- Stellar (2018–)
- Stillwater by Zdarsky & Pérez (2020-)
- Stone
- Stormwatch
- The Strange Adventures of H.P. Lovecraft (2009)
- Strange Girl (2005–2007)
- The Strange Talent of Luther Strode (2011–2012)
- Strangers
- Stray Bullets (1995–)
- Stray Dogs (2021)
- Stupid Comics
- Suburban Glamour
- Sullivan's Sluggers
- Super Dinosaur
- Superman/Savage Dragon: Chicago #1 (June 2002; co-published with DC Comics)
- Superman & Savage Dragon: Metropolis #1 (November 1999; co-published with DC Comics)
- Supermassive
- SuperPatriot #1–4 (July–December 1993)
  - SuperPatriot: America's Fighting Force #1–4 (July–October 2002)
- Supreme
- Supreme Blue Rose #1–7 (July 2014–March 2015)
- Sweets
- The Sword
- Sword of Damocles #1–2 (March–June 1996)
- Sword of Dracula #1–6 (October 2003–September 2004)
- Sylvia Faust (2004–2005)

=== T ===
- Team 7
- Team X/Team 7 #1 (November 1996; co-published with Marvel Comics)
- Team Youngblood #1–22 (September 1993–April 1996)
- Teen Wolf
- Teenage Mutant Ninja Turtles
- Tellos
- Tellos: Second Coming (2005)
- The Tenth
- Tenth Muse
- Texas Strangers
- They're Not Like Us (2014-; written by Eric Stephenson, art by Simon Gane, & colors by Jordie Bellaire)
- That Texas Blood
- Thief of Thieves (2012)
- Throwaways (2016)
- Tokyo Ghost
- Tomb Raider
- Total Eclipse One Shot (1998)
- A Touch of Silver
- Transhuman
- Trees (2015)
- Trencher
- Tribe
- The Tripper
- Troubleman (1996; miniseries 1–3)
- True Story, Swear to God
- Turf

=== U ===
- Ultra
- Ultramega (2021)
- Umbra
- Underground
- Undying Love (2011)
- Union
- Unnatural by Mirka Andolfo (2018–2019)

=== V ===
- Vampirella/Wetworks #1 (June 1997; co-published with Harris Comics)
- Vampirella/Shadowhawk: Creatures of the Night #1–2 (February–March 1995; co-published with Harris Comics)
- Vanguard (1993–1994)
- Velocity
- Velvet (2013–2016)
- Violator vs. Badrock #1–4 (May–August 1995)
- V.I.C.E. (2005–2006)
- Victory (2003–2004)
  - Victory vol. 2 (2004–2005)
- Viking (2009–2010)
- Vinyl
- Violent Messiahs
- A Voice in the Dark
- Void Rivals
- Voltron

=== W ===
- Wahoo Morris #1 (March 2000)
- Walkie Talkie #1–4 (March 2002–June 2002)
- The Walking Dead #1–193 (October 2003–July 2019)
- War Heroes #1–3 (July 2008–October 2009)
- Warblade: Endangered Species #1–4 (January–April 1995)
- Warcry #1 (June 1995)
- Ward of the State #1–3 (May–July 2007)
- Warlands #1–12 (August 1999–February 2001)
- The Warning #1–10 (November 2018–August 2019)
- Waterloo Sunset #1–4 (July 2004–October 2005)
- Wayward #1–30 (August 2014–October 2018)
- We Stand On Guard #1–6 (July–December 2015)
- Weapon Zero #1–4 and #0 (June–October 1995, December 1995)
  - Weapon Zero vol. 2, #1–15 (March 1995–December 1997)
- Weasel Guy: Road Trip #1–2 (August–October 1999)
- The Weather Man #1–6 (June–November 2018)
  - The Weather Man vol. 2, #1–6 (June 2019–January 2020)
- Weird Work #1–3 (July 2023–present)
- The Weird World of Jack Staff, Britain's Greatest Hero! #1–6 (February 2010–April 2011)
- Wetworks #1–43 (July 1994–August 1998)
- Wetworks/Vampirella #1 (July 1997; co-published with Harris Comics)
- What's the Furthest Place from Here? #1–14 (November 2021–present)
- Whatever Happened to Baron von Shock? (2010 Image) #1–4 (May – November 2010)
- Where is Jake Ellis? (2012) #1–5 (November 2012–December 2015)
- Whispers #1–6 (January 2012–October 2013)
- The White Trees #1–2 (August–September 2019)
- Whiz Kids #1 (April 2003)
- Who is Jake Ellis? #1–5 (January–October 2011)
- The Wicked #1–7 (December 1999–August 2000)
- The Wicked: Medusa's Tale #1 (November 2000)
- The Wicked + The Divine #1–45 (June 2014–September 2019)
- The Wicked West (October 2004)
- The Wicked West II: Abomination & Other Tales (October 2006)
- Wild Children (July 2012)
- WildC.A.T.s: Covert Action Teams #1–40 (August 1992–June 1998)
- WildC.A.T.s Adventures #1–10 (September 1994–June 1995)
- WildC.A.T.s/Aliens #1 (August 1998; co-published with Dark Horse Comics)
- WildC.A.T.s/X-Men (co-published with Marvel Comics)
  - The Golden Age #1 (February 1997)
  - The Silver Age #1 (June 1997)
  - The Modern Age #1 (August 1997)
- WildCats Trilogy #1–3 (June–August 1993)
- Wildguard: Casting Call #1-6 (September 2003–February 2004)
- Wildguard: Fire Power #1 (December 2004)
- Wildguard: Fools Gold #1-2 (July 2005)
- Wildguard: Insider #1-3 (May 2008–July 2008)
- WildStar: Sky Zero #1–4 (March–November 1993; 4-issue mini-series)
  - WildStar #1–3 (September 1995-January 1996)
- Wildstorm! #1–4 (August–December 1995)
- Witch Doctor #1–5 (2011; 5-issue mini-series)
- Wonderlost #1–2 (January 2007–February 2008)
- Wynonna Earp #1–5 (December 1996–April 1997)
- Wytches #1–6 (October 2014–May 2015)

=== X ===
- X-Force/Youngblood #1 (August 1996; co-published with Marvel Comics)
- X-Men/WildC.A.T.s: The Dark Age #1 (May 1998; co-published with Marvel Comics)
- Xenoholics #1–5 (October–February 2011)
- XXXombies #1–4 (October 2007–April 2008)

=== Y ===
- Youngblood #1–12 and #0 (April 1992–December 1994, December 1992)
- Youngblood: Battlezone #1–2 (May–July 1993)
- Youngblood: Strikefile #1–11 (April 1993–February 1995)
- Youngblood/X-Force #1 (July 1996; co-published with Marvel Comics)

=== Z ===
- Zealot #1–3 (August–November 1995)
- Zero #1–18 (September 2013–July 2015)
- Zombee (October 2006)
- Zombie King #0 (June 2005)
- Zorro: Matanzas (July 1999)
- ZVRC: Zombies vs Robots Classic #1–4 (March–June 2022)

== Graphic novels ==
- Black Cherry (by Doug TenNapel, July 2007, ISBN 1-58240-830-0)
- Blue in Green (by Ram V and Anand RK, October 2020, ISBN 1-5343-1713-9)
- Devoid of Life (by Raffaele Ienco, September 2008, ISBN 1-58240-987-0)
- Displaced Persons (by Derek McCulloch and Anthony Peruzzo, August 2014, ISBN 1-63215-121-9)
- Douglas Fredericks and the House of They (with Joe Kelly and Ben Roman, December 2008, ISBN 1-58240-994-3)
- Earthboy Jacobus (by Doug TenNapel, 2005, ISBN 1-58240-492-5)
- The Five Fists of Science (by Matt Fraction and Steven Sanders, 2006, ISBN 1-58240-605-7)
- Flight (2004; comics anthology currently running to 7 volumes)
- Four-Letter Worlds (March 2005, ISBN 1-58240-439-9)
- Gear (by Doug TenNapel, 1999, ISBN 1-58240-680-4)
- Hector Plasm: De Mortuis (by Benito Cereno and illustrated by Nate Bellegarde, June 2006)
- Iron West (by Doug TenNapel, July 2006, ISBN 1-58240-630-8)
- Inferno Girl Red (by Mat Groom and Erica D'urso, 2022)
- Long Hot Summer (by Eric Stephenson with art by Jamie McKelvie, October 2005, ISBN 978-1-58240-559-9)
- Popgun (edited by Mark Andrew Smith and Joe Keatinge, 2007; comics anthology currently running to 4 volumes)
- Pug (by Derek McCulloch and Greg Espinoza, July 2010, 2010, ISBN 1-60706-066-3)
- Stagger Lee (by Derek McCulloch and Shepherd Hendrix, May 2006, ISBN 1-58240-607-3)
- Tales From the Bully Pulpit (by Benito Cereno and illustrated by Graeme MacDonald, August 2004, ISBN 1-58240-393-7)
- Tommysaurus Rex (by Doug TenNapel, August 2004, ISBN 1-58240-395-3)
- The Wizard's Tale

== Extreme Studios ==
- Avengelyne (1996)
- Badrock (1995–1996)
- Badrock and Company (1994–1995)
- Bloodstrike (1993–1995)
- Brigade vol. 2 (1993–1995)
  - Brigade vol. 3 (2010)
- Glory (1995–1996)
- Prophet (1993–1995)
  - Prophet vol. 2 (1995–1996)
- Supreme (1992–1996)
- Team Youngblood (1993–1996)
- Youngblood (1992–1994)
  - Youngblood vol. 2 (1995–1996)
- Youngblood Strikefile (1993–1995)

== Highbrow Entertainment ==
- Dart (1996)
- Deadly Duo (1994–1995)
  - Deadly Duo vol. 2 (1995)
- The Dragon (1996)
- Dragon: Blood & Guts (1995)
- Freak Force (1993–1995)
  - Freak Force vol. 2 (1997)
- Savage Dragon (1992)
  - Savage Dragon vol. 2 (1993–)
- Savage Dragon: God War (2004–2005)
- Savage Dragon/Marshal Law (1997)
- Savage Dragon: Red Horizon (1997)
- Savage Dragon: Sex and Violence (1997)
- Star (1995)
- SuperPatriot (1993)
  - SuperPatriot: America's Fighting Force (2002)
  - SuperPatriot: Liberty & Justice (1995)
  - SuperPatriot: War on Terror (2004–2005)
- Teenage Mutant Ninja Turtles Vol. 3 (1996–1999)
- Vanguard (1993–1994)
  - Vanguard: Strange Visitors (1996–1997)

== Todd McFarlane Productions ==
- The Adventures of Spawn (2007–2008)
- Angela (1994–1995)
  - Angela & Aria
  - Angela & Glory
- Celestine
- The Creech (1997)
  - The Creech: Out for Blood (2001)
- Curse of the Spawn (1996–1999)
- Cy-Gor (1999)
- Daring Escapes (1998–1999)
- Gunslinger Spawn (2021-present)
- Haunt (2009–2012)
- Hellspawn (2000–2003)
- King Spawn (2021-)
- Kiss: Psycho Circus (1997–2000)
- Medieval Spawn / Witchblade (1996)
- Medieval Spawn / Witchblade (2018)
- Misery
- Sam & Twitch (1999–2004)
  - Case Files: Sam & Twitch (2003–2006)
  - Sam & Twitch: The Writer (2010)
  - Sam & Twitch: True Detectives
- Savior (2015)
- Spawn: Fan Edition
- Spawn: Simony
- Spawn: Blood and Salvation
- Spawn: Architects of Fear
- Spawn: Resurrection
- Spawn: Blood and Shadows (1999)
- Spawn; Toy comics
- Shadows of Spawn (2005–2006)
- Spawn (1992-)
- Spawn: Blood Feud (1995)
- Spawn: The Dark Ages (1999–2001)
- Spawn: Godslayer (2007–2008)
- Spawn: The Impaler (1996)
- Spawn: The Undead (1999–2000)
- Spawn Kills Everyone (2016-2019)
- Spawn Universe #1 (2021)
- Spawn: Unwanted violence (2023)
- The Scorched (2021-)
- Todd Mcfarlane Presents: The Crow (1999)
- Violator (1994)
- Violator:Origin
- Violator vs Badrock

== Top Cow Productions ==
- Codename: Strykeforce (1994–1995)
- Cyberforce (1993–1997)
  - Cyberforce vol. 2 (2006)
- Impaler (2006–2007)
  - Impaler vol. 2 (2008–2010)
- Think Tank (2012)
- Witchblade (1995–2015)
