= List of unproduced Image Comics projects =

Current Image Comics logo

This is a list of unmade and unreleased projects by Image Comics. Some of these productions were, or still are, in development hell. Projects that have not provided significant production announcements within at least a year, would be considered in development limbo until further announcements are released. The following include films, television shows, and video games, whether as live-action or animated productions.

== Live action films ==
=== Madman film ===
According to Mike Allred, he was first offered the chance to sell the film rights to Madman in 1992 (he has not said who made the offer, only that he declined). Since 1998, film-maker Robert Rodriguez has owned the film rights to Madman. Both he and Allred have given numerous signals as to the start of production over the years, but with no result. Although both have been occupied with other projects (Allred was instrumental in connecting Rodriguez with Frank Miller, leading to the production of Sin City), both have been eager to see this film made. Robin Williams was mentioned as being under consideration for the role of Dr. Boiffard before his death.

At the 2006 WonderCon in San Francisco, Allred announced that Madman the Movie was in pre-production and hoped to begin filming before the end of the year. He teased fans in attendance by saying that the titular role had already been cast, "but I can't tell you who it is yet.... When we announce it, you're gonna be like 'What?', then you'll think about it for a second and see that it's perfect". In 2015, Allred indicated that the rights to Madman had reverted to him, and in September 2019 has stated that he prefers to focus on comics rather than film or television adaptations for the time being.

=== Prophet film ===
In 1995, TriStar Pictures acquired the film rights to Prophet. A live-action film was planned with Rob Liefeld as a producer, but the project did not proceed beyond pre-production. In 2018, Studio 8 acquired the film rights to Prophet. In May 2020, It was announced that Marc Guggenheim will write the film's script. On October 7, 2021, it was announced that Jake Gyllenhaal would star in the titular role with Sam Hargrave directing. On October 21, 2022, it was revealed that Kurt Johnstad will write a new version of the script.

=== TMNT 4: The Next Mutation/The Foot Walks Again ===
Kevin Eastman was working on a fourth Teenage Mutant Ninja Turtles film between 1995 and 1997 titled TMNT 4: The Next Mutation or TMNT 4: The Foot Walks Again. In 2012, Heritage Auctions published concept arts showing a fifth turtle named Kirby, but also featured are Fang, Shredder, Spyder, Nano Spyder, Super Shredder, Casey, Talbot, Lawson, Bugman and "Evil April". Peter Laird showed some concept art of the Turtles and Splinter on his blog. The main concept behind the film will have the turtles undergo a second mutation due to the mutagen in the heroes' bloodstream beginning to change with age and giving them new abilities and new problems. Also, the film would revolve around the return of the Shredder and proceeded to rebuild the Foot empire.

=== The Crow: 2037 ===
The Crow: 2037 was a planned sequel to The Crow written and scheduled to be directed by Rob Zombie in the late 1990s, but was never made.

=== Powers film ===
In 2001, Sony Pictures had optioned the comic series for a film production, commissioning a writers room. After development seemed to have stalled, Sony shifted focus in creating a TV show based on the comic instead.

=== Spawn 2 ===
A sequel, tentatively titled Spawn 2, has been in development hell since 1998. Producer Don Murphy maintained that he was part of the project in 2001. McFarlane stated that the film would have centered primarily on the detective characters Sam and Twitch, with Spawn only as a background character.

=== Battle Chasers film ===
In March 2003, Twentieth Century Fox has optioned feature rights to the fantasy comic book series with Gil Netter attached to produce.

=== Astro City film ===
In 2003, Ben Barenholtz, Jonathan Alpers and Kurt Busiek hoped to develop an Astro City movie, with Barenholtz as producer and Alpers as lead scripter, but the plans did not take off, whereupon Barenholtz subsequently took the project to Working Title Films. In July 2010, Working Title acquired the rights to make a live-action feature film adaptation of Astro City. Busiek was to write a script treatment, and also to executive-produce, along with Barenholtz and Alpers. Kurt Busiek revealed in May 2013 that Working Title's option had lapsed but he was in negotiation with another party. In March 2018, FremantleMedia North America announced to produce a live-action Astro City TV series with a pilot episode written by Busiek and Rick Alexander.

=== Scud: The Disposable Assassin film ===
There have been two attempts to adapt Scud: The Disposable Assassin into a film and TV show. A live-action feature film was optioned by producer Oliver Stone, but the option lapsed in the early 2000s.

=== The Legend of Isis ===
In 2004, The Legend of Isis was optioned for a major motion picture by Paramount Studios and Grammnet Productions, with screenwriter Ali Russell.

=== Jinx film ===
In 2004, Charlize Theron signed on to produce and star in a film adapted from Jinx for Universal Pictures.

=== The Darkness film ===
In December 2004, Dimension Films paid an undisclosed six-figure sum to develop a film based on the comic, with a planned release for 2008. The film rights were later sold to the Pang brothers one year later. At Comic-Con 2009, Top Cow president Matt Hawkins revealed that a live-action The Darkness film was in development, with Scott Stuber Productions attached as the producer for the project. In 2012, Len Wiseman signed on to produce the film.

=== Lions, Tigers and Bears film ===
The comic book series Lions, Tigers and Bears was optioned for film in the fall of 2005 by Union Entertainment for six months, but the company closed their doors before a movie could be undertaken. In 2009, Paramount optioned the comic series, with a screenplay by Joey Aucoin and Lorenzo di Bonaventura set to produce. The film was to be live action, with "heavy doses" of CGI animation.

=== Hack/Slash film ===
The possibility of Hack/Slash being made into a live-action film by Rogue Pictures was discussed by director Todd Lincoln, writer Martin Schenk, series creator Tim Seeley, and others at the 2006 San Diego Comic-Con, to be released in 2008. In 2012, Marcus Nispel, who directed Conan the Barbarian remake, was revealed to have agreed to helm the film for Relativity and Rogue. In October 2015, Relativity announced that the series would instead be adapted into a television series and would be written by Skip Woods, who would serve as executive producer alongside Adrian Askarieh, who first optioned it in 2005. By 2018, there have been no updates on the prospective series, causing outlets such as /Film to assume that the series is in development hell.

=== Rex Mundi film ===
There have been a number of rumours about a film version of Rex Mundi. In 2006, Jim Uhls was hired to write a script for Johnny Depp to star in and produce. It is not known how much further production has progressed since then. Arvid Nelson confirmed the rumor of the film, and working with Johnny Depp. In December 2008, Nelson described that "the wheels of Hollywood grind slowly. ... We are at a second revision of the screenplay, so that's good. The way this works is there are periods of feverish activity, followed by lulls ... We're in one of the lulls now". An interview with MTV's Splash Page in March 2009 confirmed the film was still progressing and searching for a director.

=== Occult Crimes Taskforce film ===
The Occult Crimes Taskforce film rights were acquired by Dimension Films in September 2006.

=== Darkchylde film ===
In August 2007, Randy Queen, creator of the comic book character Darkchylde, revealed to Newsarama that a movie is in the works. In an interview with Nicholas Yanes from scifipulse.net, Queen was asked and responded to a question about a film/television adaptation of Darkchylde: "Yanes: For years now there have been rumors of Darkchylde being turned into an animated series, miniseries for a cable network and movie. Are you able to comment on Darkchylde's potential future on in television and film? Any actresses you'd love to play Ariel? Queen: A movie makes so much sense it's ridiculous, and all I can say is that we are working on it. I know that's a frustrating answer for fans, but it's a frustrating process. It's probably best for me not to comment on actresses, so we will just all have to wait and see". Test footage from the set of Darkchylde emerged in July 2010 and on October 31, John Carpenter was revealed to direct the film. Since then, there has not been any further announcements, falling into development hell.

=== Luchadores 5 film ===
In September 2007, a Luchadores 5 live action film was in the early stages of production.

=== Spawn remake ===
In 2007, McFarlane Funding announced development of a new feature film adaptation of the character, titled Spawn, originally scheduled for release in 2008. During an interview on the Scott Ferrall show on Sirius radio, McFarlane said: "It's coming out no matter what. Even if I have to produce, direct and finance it myself, it's going to come out".

McFarlane began writing in August 2009 the screenplay for a new film based on the character, saying that "the story has been in my head for 7 or 8 years", that "the movie idea is neither a recap or continuation. It is a standalone story that will be R-rated. Creepy and scary", and that "the tone of this Spawn movie will be for a more older audience. Like the film The Departed". Michael Jai White said in July 2011 that he was interested in returning to the role, expressing his support for McFarlane's film. In 2013, Jamie Foxx was "aggressively pursuing" the Spawn reboot. In August, McFarlane discussed his progress with the script, stating that the film would be "more of a horror movie and a thriller movie, not a superhero one".

In February 2016, McFarlane completed the film's script. Blumhouse Productions confirmed their involvement with the film as of July 2017, while announcing that McFarlane had also signed on to direct the project. The film was expected to begin production by February 2018. In May 2018, Jamie Foxx was hired to portray the titular character, while in July Jeremy Renner was attached to portray, alongside Foxx, as Detective Twitch. In September, Greg Nicotero was hired to create the special effects for the film. The filming start date was delayed to June 2019. In November 2019, the film restarted development due to the financial success of the R-rated comic book film Joker. In December, McFarlane hired an additional writer to help polish the script, before presenting it to a major Hollywood studio. In March 2020, McFarlane revealed that filming was to begin before the end of the year.

=== Witchblade film ===
A feature film adaptation of Witchblade was announced in 2008 and scheduled for a 2009 release, but was never produced. The film was to have been produced by Platinum Studios, Top Cow Productions, and Arclight Media, with Top Cow's Matt Hawkins and Marc Silvestri, Platinum's Rich Marincic, and Greenberg Group's Randy Greenberg serving as executive producers. Production was planned for September 2008, with filming to be done in Australia.

=== War Heroes film ===
In September 2008, War Heroes was optioned by Columbia Pictures, with Michael De Luca as producer and Millar taking an executive producer role. In 2011, Jeff Kirschenbaum bought the film rights from Columbia after they had let it lapse, and he set the film up at Universal Pictures. Thomas Dean Donnelly and Joshua Oppenheimer were considered to write the script.

=== Wanted 2 ===
Even before the film's release, Mark Millar announced director Timur Bekmambetov was planning a sequel to Wanted, though Millar denied that he would write a sequel to the comic book. He was instead creating a story along with the producers, that would follow the first film's idea of an international guild of assassins. Terence Stamp described Pekwarsky as "something that's written for a sequel", and Common expressed interest in a prequel, feeling that both The Gunsmith and Fox deserved more exposition.

Chris Morgan would return to write the sequel's screenplay, but departed in April 2009 due to "excessive workload", leaving the task to Evan Spiliotopoulos. Later in June, Bekmambetov said that pre-production for Wanted 2 was about to get started, with filming scheduled to begin in late fall or winter. The film was to have a reported budget of $150 million and to be shot in the United States, India, and Russia. He also added that some of the characters would resurrect, particularly Fox and The Exterminator. On September, the director added that even without a finished script Bazelevs had already done previsualization of the action scenes. In 2010, after reports that Angelina Jolie had pulled out of the sequel, Millar said that the script would be rewritten to remove Fox's return, so production could start that year for a late 2011 release. Eventually the production did not take off, leading Bekmambetov to work on Abraham Lincoln: Vampire Hunter instead.

In a 2011 Q&A, producer Jim Lemley said that "Wanted 2 sounds like it will not happen any time soon if at all". That same year, James McAvoy said, regarding the sequel: "I think the studio is keen to make it, and we really want to make it, but we want to make it if it's right and when it's right, and that might not be ever". McAvoy also expressed interest in a sequel focusing on a character other than Wesley. Universal later brought Wanted screenwriters Michael Brandt and Derek Haas to write the sequel, which Haas described as happening "right after the events that just happened; it'll pick up Wesley a few years later and go back in for another round", while also being "Fox-less and loom-less". Haas would later detail that the script featured a new female protagonist, who Wesley would recruit "sort of in the Fox role". Bekmambetov declared during the interviews for Abraham Lincoln: Vampire Hunter that after many years of indecision as the Wanted sequel stalled in development, he proposed an idea to the screenwriters wherein the plot followed Wesley while featuring "a great twist".

McAvoy declared that since he "had a blast making the first Wanted", he would make a sequel regardless of the quality of the script; however, he also acknowledged that the extended time the film spent in development "suggests to me that they're not finding it very easy to come up with a story that they're passionate about, so we'll have to wait and see". In 2014, McAvoy acknowledged that a potential sequel has been in the talks, saying he "had a couple of versions of script thrown my way" while adding that Universal is still waiting for the right screenplay.

In June 2020, Bekmambetov expressed renewed interest in a sequel, perhaps as a computer screen film because "I cannot imagine an assassin in today's world would run with a gun. Why? He will use drones, he will use computer technology, probably."

=== Magdalena film ===
A Magdalena film adaptation was planned by Top Cow in 2008. In July 2009, Ryûhei Kitamura was attached to direct with Holly Brix writing. Jenna Dewan and Luke Goss were set to star.

=== Youngblood film ===
In February 2009, Reliance Entertainment acquired the feature film rights to Youngblood, reportedly for a mid-six figures, with Brett Ratner attached to direct.

=== XXXombies film ===
In March 2009, Rick Remender and Kieron Dwyer were working on a XXXombies screenplay for a proposed film.

=== John Fusco TMNT film ===
In late April 2009, a new live-action film was announced to be in the works for a 2011 release. Mirage Studios was partnering with producers Scott Mednick and Galen Walker, with Peter Laird, Gary Richardson, Frederick Fierst, Eric Crown as executive producers, and 4Kids Entertainment handling the film's merchandising with Lightbox Productions, LLC. funding the project. The film would have used animatronic suits whose facial expressions would be digitally enhanced in post-production. It was stated that the story would focus on the Turtle's origin. Few months later, an open casting call was made for extras to play as members of the Foot Clan with Ernie Reyes Jr. as an acting judge. "Ninja Turtles" co-creator Peter Laird said "there were a lot of positive feelings about a Batman Begins-style reboot, while producer Galen Walker said the film would be headed in a darker direction. In July the same year, John Fusco was hired to be the film's writer. His version was to be inspired by the original dark and gritty black and white comics that Eastman created with Peter Laird, but Paramount was not on board. Kevin Eastman described the script as being "too edgy for what Paramount wanted". Peter Laird revealed the film would have been a direct sequel to the 1990 film while ignoring its earlier sequels. In October, Viacom's subsidiary network Nickelodeon had purchased all of Mirage's rights to the Teenage Mutant Ninja Turtles property for $9.75 million, thus terminating all deals with 4Kids and Time Warner.

=== Deadworld film ===
In June 2009, Deadworld was to be turned into a film. Jeffrey D. Erb and Framelight Productions along with Dark Hero Studios partners David Hayter and Benedict Carver have teamed up with Bill Mechanic to turn the comic book into a zombie feature franchise.

=== Fear Agent film ===
In July 2009, Universal Pictures was in the early stages of developing a film based on Fear Agent.

=== The Pro film ===
In October 2009, Amanda Conner and Jimmy Palmiotti proposed a live-action adaptation of The Pro. They have said that they would like to have either Sarah Silverman or Ellen Muth as the lead. In March 2017, Paramount Pictures picked up the film rights to The Pro and hired Zoe McCarthy to write the screenplay.

=== Alibi film ===
A film based on Alibi from the 2008 Pilot Season one-shots was announced in 2009. The production was associated with Mandeville Films and Summit Entertainment, and John Hlavin was attached to write the adaptation. The story follows John and Rick Stephens. John is a wealthy socialite whose life provides a cover for Rick, who is a top-secret government assassin.

=== Danger Girl film ===
In April 2010, Hitman: Agent 47 producer Adrian Askarieh announced that he was developing a film based on Danger Girl with Todd Lincoln as director. In November 2017, Constantin Film acquired the rights to develop Danger Girl as a film, in partnership with Askarieh's Prime Universe Films and Jeremy Bolt's Bolt Pictures. In February 2018, Umair Aleem was announced as the film's writer, with creators J. Scott Campbell and Andy Hartnell serving as executive producers alongside Constantin Film's Martin Moszkowicz. In March 2019, Jeff Wadlow was announced to write and direct the film.

=== Crosshair film ===
After the 2010 San Diego Comic-Con, Mandeville Films announced to develop a film adaptation of Crosshair from the 2010 Pilot Season with producers David Hoberman and Todd Lieberman. Morgan Foehl was attached to write the adaptation in 2011, and Summit Entertainment came on board as well.

=== Mage film ===
In August 2010, a film version of Mage had been in development at Spyglass Entertainment with Zack Snyder set to direct, but the rights were subsequently picked up by Watchmen and Hellboy producer Lloyd Levin.

=== Elephantmen film ===
At WonderCon in 2010 Comicraft/Active Images revealed the option of Elephantmen was bought by Zucker Productions for development into a film. Richard Starkings was working on the draft treatment, and was enthusiastic: "Jerry Zucker and I can't wait to bring the stories of Hip, Horn and Sahara to life on screen in a way that will simply take your breath away".

=== Cowboy Ninja Viking film ===
In 2010, Disney purchased the rights to make a film adaptation of Cowboy Ninja Viking. Zombieland screenwriters Paul Wernick and Rhett Reese were slated to pen the film's screenplay. Disney dropped the film in turnaround and Universal acquired the rights in 2012, with World War Z director Marc Forster attached to direct, and Craig Mazin attached to write the script. Chris Pratt was cast as the lead in November 2014. John Wick directors David Leitch and Chad Stahelski were in early talks to replace Forster, who left the project. In 2018, Michelle MacLaren was confirmed as director for the film. Dan Mazeau and Ryan Engle were brought on board to work on the screenplay. In June, Pratt confirmed MacLaren and members of the production team were in Berlin testing actors, with filming to commence in July. Later in July, Priyanka Chopra was cast in the lead female role opposite Pratt. The film was set to be released on June 28, 2019, but was pulled in August from its release schedule. As of August 2018, it is considered in active development, the delay accommodating production scheduling and script concerns.

=== Turf film ===
In 2011, Chris Bender's production company Benderspink had optioned a film adaptation of Turf.

=== The Red Star film ===
Warner Bros. was developing a film version of The Red Star. Josh Trank, director of Chronicle, was attached to develop the project in 2012.

=== Undying Love film ===
In March 2012, Alexandre Aja, director of Piranha 3D, was in negotiations to direct a film adaptation of Undying Love. Aja left in November and Joe Carnahan, director of The Grey, The A-Team and Smokin' Aces, was in negotiations to direct Undying Love for Warner Bros. It will be produced by Michael De Luca and Stephen L'Heureux and also by Chris Bender and J.C. Spink of Benderspink. In early 2019, David Leitch was hired to direct Undying Love from Tommy Wirkola for Studio 8 and is produced by Jeff Robinov, Kelly McCormick, and Stephen L'Heureux.

=== Epic Kill film ===
In March 2012, Content House started developing a feature film based on the comic book series Epic Kill by Raffaele Ienco about an 18-year-old assassin trying to avenge her parents deaths, with the President of the United States sending mercenaries to stop her.

=== Devoid of Life film ===
In March 2012, production companies Content House and Mosaic Media Group announced development of a Devoid of Life film based on the graphic novel by Raffaele Ienco. Melinda Hsu Taylor was set to write the screenplay of a sci-fi tale about horrible deaths after the discovery of a hidden planet and a threat to human life.

=== Kick-Ass 3 ===
In April 2012, while Kick-Ass 2 was still in pre-production Mark Millar stated that a third film was also planned. One year later in June, however, he revealed that it was not confirmed and would be dependent on how successful the second film was. Later the same month he further elaborated that if it went ahead, the third film would be the final installment: "Kick-Ass 3 is going to be the last one... I told Universal this and they asked me, 'What does that mean?' I said, 'It means that this is where it all ends'. They said, 'Do they all die at the end?' I said, 'Maybe' – because this is a realistic superhero story... if someone doesn't have a bullet proof vest like Superman, and doesn't have Batman's millions, then eventually he is going to turn around the wrong corner and get his head kicked in or get shot in the face. So Kick-Ass needs to reflect that. There has to be something dramatic at the end; he cannot do this for the rest of his life". Moretz has shown interest in returning for a third installment and was interested in exploring Hit-Girl's dark side: "I want to see something we haven't seen yet. Now we've seen who Mindy is, now we've seen who Hit-Girl is, I think we need to meld the characters together and have Mindy become Hit-Girl and Hit-Girl become Mindy. Maybe her natural hair has a streak of purple in it, maybe she really does go kind of crazy and go a bit darker since she lost her father. I would only do the third one if it was logical. It needs to be a good script and a director, probably Matthew (Vaughn). The third film needs to fully wrap up the series and has to be a good note to end on".

After the release of Kick-Ass 2, Millar stated that the film was "in the pipeline". While at a press junket for Godzilla in May 2014, Taylor-Johnson said he was still up for a third film but was not contracted for it and there were no plans for it. In the same month, Christopher Mintz-Plasse revealed he had not heard anything but expressed doubt that a third film would happen due to the second installment's disappointing box office performance. In June, Chloë Grace Moretz echoed her co-stars' sentiments when asked about Kick-Ass 3, hoping to coming out. She also cited the second film's lower box office gross as the key obstacle to the third chapter being produced and suggested file sharing was a factor: "The hard thing is if fans want a third movie, they've got to go buy the ticket to go see the movie. It was like the second most pirated movie of the year, so if you want a movie to be made into a second, a third, a fourth and a fifth, go buy a ticket. Don't pirate it". In June 2018, Matthew Vaughn announced his intention to set up Marv Studios, under which banner he will produce a reboot of the Kick-Ass series.

=== Manifestations film ===
In July 2012, Content House announced development of a feature adaptation of the graphic novel Manifestations by Raffaele Ienco.

=== The Amory Wars film ===
In December 2012, Mark Wahlberg announced to produce a film adaptation of The Amory Wars.

=== The Sword film ===
In 2013, Lakeshore Entertainment were making the film version of The Sword with David Hayter writing the film's script.

=== Saga film ===
Interest has been expressed in adapting Saga for film or TV. In an August 2013 interview, Brian K. Vaughan and Fiona Staples stated that the point of Saga as they conceived it was "to do absolutely everything we couldn't do in a movie or a TV show. We're really happy with it just being a comic". Vaughan said that they are open to the possibility, though it is not a priority for them.

=== Starlight film ===
In December 2013, 20th Century Fox was interested to produce the Starlight film with Gary Whitta penning the script. In May 2015, Mark Millar revealed this film as his next project.

=== Who Is Jake Ellis? film ===
In April 2014, 20th Century Fox has optioned the movie rights to the comic series Who Is Jake Ellis? with David Yates attached to directing and Peter Chernin producing. Seth Lochhead was to write the script for the film. In August 2016, Josh Mond was hired to direct the film.

=== Hit-Girl prequel ===
In August 2014, Chloë Grace Moretz reiterated her previous statements and said "sadly, I think I'm done with Hit-Girl". In January 2015, Millar revealed to IGN that there was a planned Hit-Girl film with Gareth Evans directing but was cancelled. In February, Matthew Vaughn, who directed the first film, spoke optimistically about a "Hit-Girl" prequel: "If that happens, I'm pretty sure I can persuade Aaron and Chloe to come back and finish the story of Kick-Ass". Vaughn reiterated this in June about working on a prequel on how Hit-Girl and Big Daddy became superheroes and plans to make Kick-Ass 3 after. Since then, talks of any prequel have ceased.

=== Teenage Mutant Ninja Turtles: Out of the Shadows sequels ===
In August 2014, Noel Fisher stated in an interview that he and the other Turtle actors had signed on for three more Teenage Mutant Ninja Turtles: Out of the Shadows sequels. Megan Fox had also signed on for three films. Tyler Perry said that if a third film was made, his character, Baxter Stockman, would probably mutate into his fly form during the film. Pete Ploszek also expressed his interest in reprising his role in a third film as Leonardo. The plans for third film were cancelled as producer Andrew Form indicated that a third film was unlikely, due to its lower financial performance.

=== Chrononauts film ===
In 2015, Mark Millar's comic series Chrononauts was optioned for a feature film. In April 2017, Philip Gawthorne was hired to write the screenplay for the film, with Chris Morgan, Mark Millar, and Sean Murphy attached as producers.

=== Jupiter's Legacy film ===
In 2015, Mark Millar and Lorenzo di Bonaventura partnered to develop the comic into feature films. Lorenzo explained his attraction to the property: "What appealed to me was the emotional weight of the family dynamic in Shakespearean fashion". In June 2016, Brian and Mark Gunn were announced as the screenwriters for adapting the property to the big screen. Although the film version did not came, the project was revived as a Netflix series, but was cancelled after one season.

=== The Fade Out film ===
In 2015, Ed Brubaker received calls from interested parties in Hollywood about adapting The Fade Out very early in its publication. However, he did not want to sell the rights until the series was finished. He had done so with a previous work, and it affected the way he wrote it because he was imagining it in the other medium.

=== Huck film ===
In October 2015, Studio 8 bought the film rights to Rafael Albuquerque's comic series Huck.

=== Rising Stars film ===
In 2016, MGM optioned Rising Stars, with J. Michael Straczynski slated to write the script and Alex Gartner and Richard Suckle to produce for Atlas Entertainment.

=== Extreme Universe film ===
In January 2017, series creator Rob Liefeld worked with Akiva Goldsman and Graham King to adapt the property into a film franchise. One year later, Netflix bought the series.

=== Invincible film ===
In April 2017, Seth Rogen and Evan Goldberg were attached to write, direct and co-produce a film adaptation of the comic for Universal Pictures. It was to be produced by Point Grey Pictures and Skybound Entertainment. Series creator Robert Kirkman was also set to produce the film, alongside David Alpert and Bryan and Sean Furst.

=== Revival film ===
At the April 2017 Chicago Comic & Entertainment Expo, a film adaptation of Revival was announced. It will be co-written by Seeley and Sarah Fischer, directed by Luke Boyce and produced by Shatterglass Films, an independent film company based in Champaign, Illinois. Larger production firms also expressed interest, but Seeley would have had less input into the film if it were made by them. Boyce said he had enjoyed Revival since its debut, and had been thinking about adapting it long before he met the creators. A two-minute proof of concept teaser was shown at the expo.

=== Son of Shaolin film ===
In July 2017, Rick Famuyiwa was attached to direct Son of Shaolin, based on the comic of the same name by Jay Longino.

=== Kill or Be Killed film ===
In December 2017, a film adaptation of Kill or Be Killed was announced, written by Dan Casey and directed by Chad Stahelski.

=== Birthright film ===
In January 2018, a film adaptation of Birthright was announced, with Cinco Paul and Ken Daurio writing the script.

=== Analog film ===
Chad Stahelski was hired in May 2018 to direct and co-produce a film adaptation of Analog, with Ryan Condal, based on the Gerry Duggan comic.

=== Infidel film ===
In May 2018, Michael Sugar and TriStar announced a developmental deal to adapt Infidel into a film. In December later that year, Hany Abu-Assad was set to direct Infidel from Juliet Snowden and Stiles White's screenplay. There has been further announcements since.

== Animated films ==
=== Bone film ===
In the late 1990s, an attempt was made by Nickelodeon Movies to produce a film adaptation of Bone. Jeff Smith said in a 2003 interview that Nickelodeon wanted the Bone cousins to be voiced by pre-teen actors, and wanted the film's soundtrack to include pop songs by the likes of N'Sync. Smith's response was that one would never insert pop songs in the middle of The Lord of the Rings or The Empire Strikes Back, and therefore pop songs should not be placed in Bone either. Warner Bros. Pictures bought the film rights to the series in 2008, which was confirmed on March 13, to adapt the Bone saga into a film series. Further information was given in July 2011, citing that "two scripts have already been written and rejected—a third is currently in the works and will most likely yield three separate, computer-animated, 3-D films". In January 2012, Patrick Sean Smith, the creator of TV series Greek, was hired to write an adaptation, and that P. J. Hogan was attached to direct the feature, which was to be produced by Lin Pictures and Animal Logic. In November 2016, Mark Osborne was hired to direct the animated adaptation for Warner Animation Group. Osborne, along with Adam Kline, was set to write the film, as the first in a planned trilogy.

=== TMNT sequels ===
In 2007 Kevin Munroe stated that he would like to direct a possible sequel to TMNT, possibly involving the return of the Shredder. Munroe planned a trilogy. TMNT 2 would have loosely adapted the Turtles' 13-part comic book saga "City At War". Michelangelo would have felt rejected and joined the Foot Clan, while the Turtles would have traveled to Japan and would have crossed paths with Karai and Shredder. TMNT 3 would have featured the Triceratons as well as the Technodrome's arrival from Dimension X. Munroe wanted Michael Clarke Duncan to voice the Triceraton's leader, Commander Mozar. In an interview, Peter Laird said he was interested in the idea of having the next film be a live-action and CGI hybrid film, with the Turtles rendered in CGI and Sarah Michelle Gellar and Chris Evans reprising their TMNT roles in live-action.

=== Loaded Bible film ===
In August 2009, Halo-8 Entertainment has optioned the rights to make an "illustrated film" of Loaded Bible to be directed by Matt Pizzolo, who had previously done Godkiller.

=== Chew film ===
In April 2014, an animated film adaptation of Chew entered the development. This project was to be produced by Jeff Krelitz and David Boxenbaum via their multimedia company Heavy Metal. Jeff Krelitz was hired to direct and John Layman to write. The executive producers were John Layman, Rob Guillory and Scott Boxenbaum. Steven Yeun from The Walking Dead was attached to voice the main character Tony Chu and Felicia Day as his love interest Amelia Mintz. Rob Guillory, the artist of CHEW, revealed in April 2017 that the animated film project was completely dead. Guillory simply stated that "it just didn't happen because Hollywood can be weird sometimes...we do have some movement on the live action show, though".

=== Stray Dogs film ===
In September 2020, before the first issue went on sale, Paramount Animation purchased the rights to adapt Stray Dogs into a film. The adaptation was set to be produced by Gary Dauberman and written by Mark Perez. In August 2026, six years after the announcement, Fleecs confirmed at a convention that the film was no longer moving forward, and would go on to state that getting paid a lot for the film rights was "the only good thing about it."

== Television ==
=== Cyberforce TV series ===
A half-hour Cyberforce animated series was planned for the 1995–96 season on Fox Television as part of an hour-long block. Although completed character designs and a model sheet were featured in magazines, the series never progressed past the planning stage.

=== Youngblood TV series ===
A half-hour Youngblood animated series was planned for the 1995–96 season on Fox as part of an hour block. The series was being developed by Roustabout Productions, a newly formed animation company. According to Nick Dubois, creative director and co-founder of Roustabout, the series would take a lighthearted approach with tongue-in-cheek humor.

=== Scud: The Disposable Assassin TV series ===
The second attempt was to adapt Scud into a TV series for MTV. It got as far as casting before being halted in 2004.

=== Ultra TV series ===
In January 2006, a television adaptation of Ultra was announced as being in development by producer Barbara Hall for CBS. In February, Lena Headey was cast as Ultra. A pilot episode was made, but CBS chose not to carry the show. When asked about the failed pilot in a 2008 interview with The A.V. Club, Joshua said the pilot "just wasn't good". He went on to say the script was a large departure from the comic book, such as the unexplained name change from Pearl to Penny and the removal of Aphrodite and Cowgirl. He described the pilot as being Ultra in name only.

In 2007, Jonathan and Joshua Luna spoke to director Stephen Hopkins about moving forward with an adaptation again, but it became stuck in development hell. The Lunas were still in talks for an Ultra television project in 2011.

=== Spawn: The Animation ===
In an interview with Supanova dated June 2, 2009, McFarlane said: "I'm 85% done with the new series, I just literally have to pick a studio, put a music score on top of it, and I'm done". In the same interview, McFarlane also stated that he would like to return the series to HBO, because they gave him his "big break" when he first started with his previous Spawn animated series. In November 2010, McFarlane said that he has been pitching his series to studios in Hollywood and that they were still ironing out some of the animation techniques for the future. At the New York Comic Con of October 2014, McFarlane revealed images of Sam and Twitch from the new animated series.

=== Chew TV series ===
Production company Circle of Confusion, the same company that produces the Walking Dead television series, was planning to adapt Chew. It was revealed in March 2011, that Showtime was developing it into a half-hour comedy series, based on a script by Terri Hughes Burton and Ron Milbauer.

=== OCT TV series ===
A&E Network announced to work on OCT TV show in March 2012, with Jorge Zamacona as the script writer. He was also a producer along with the comic's creators Dawson, Atchison, Gilmore and Shasteen, and The Walking Dead producer Gale Anne Hurd.

=== Thief of Thieves TV series ===
AMC was developing a television drama series based on Thief of Thieves. Charles H. Eglee was to serve as the showrunner if the project was picked up to series. Kirkman said that "because of the success of The Walking Dead and my relationships with the people over at AMC, the conversation eventually comes up: 'What else are you working on? Is there anything else you have on the horizon that might be interesting to us?' I was able to talk to them about what I was doing with Thief of Thieves while I was developing it as a comic book series, so the show and the comic are more or less developing concurrently". More than a year after the original announcement, at the 2013 San Diego Comic-Con, Kirkman said the adaptation is still in development: "Sometimes that's a short process; sometimes that's a long process. For The Walking Dead, it was five years, but we're really very hopeful Thief of Thieves will keep going and make it to series. Fingers crossed!" By 2016, Kirkman was still working on the project.

=== League of Extraordinary Gentlemen TV series ===
In 2013, Fox was ordering a pilot for the television version of LoEG with Michael Green serving as writer and executive producer. Should the project go to series, showrunner Erwin Stoff was to also executive produce. Neither Moore nor O'Neill were not involved on the series. It had also been reported that the pilot episode would still be broadcast, even if Fox opted not to green-light the series.

=== Pax Romana miniseries ===
Syfy announced in April 2014 to adapt Pax Romana into a miniseries. Matthew Federman and Stephen Scaia (Warehouse 13) were writing the show, with Scaia and David Alpert (The Walking Dead) executive producing and Jonathan Hickman serving as a co-executive producer.

=== Rat Queens TV series ===
In 2014, Pukeko Pictures and Heavy Metal magazine announced their intent to adapt Rat Queens as a 30-minute animated television series.

=== Five Ghosts TV series ===
In October 2014, SyFy announced that a series based on Five Ghosts was under development. The pilot was to be produced by Universal Cable Productions, Black Mask Studios and BenderSpink.

=== The Wicked + The Divine TV series ===
In 2015, the television rights to The Wicked + The Divine have been optioned by Universal TV.

=== Hack/Slash TV series ===
In October 2015, Relativity Television announced that the series would be adapted into a television series, written by Skip Woods, serving as executive producer, alongside Adrian Askarieh, who first optioned it in 2005. Since then, there have been no updates on the prospective series, causing outlets such as /Film to assume that the series is in development hell.

=== Lazarus TV series ===
Legendary Television bought the rights to adapt Lazarus following a competitive bidding war in March 2015. Rucka and Lark are executive producers along with David Manpearl and Matt Tolmach. A pilot script written by Rucka entered its final draft in late 2015 and Legendary began looking for a network willing to purchase it. During the hiatus between issues #21 and 22, Rucka and Lark were able to devote more time to developing the adaptation. Rucka said the development process for Lazarus has been better than any of his previous Hollywood experiences, and that he hopes the show will be able to explore characters more deeply using scenes cut from the book.

In September 2017, the adaptation was reported to be developed as a potential series for Amazon Studios, who made a "significant production investment" in it. In the letter column of Lazarus X+66 #4 (November 2017), Rucka said this announcement included some inaccuracies, and emphasized the show is still a long way from being released. He said the casting process had not yet begun.

=== The Infinite Horizon TV series ===
In 2015, Arrow executive producer Greg Berlanti was attached to direct and produce a television series based on Gerry Duggan's The Infinite Horizon comic. The script was written by Ryan Condal.

=== Trees TV series ===
In 2016, Tom Hardy and NBCUniversal announced a television series based on Warren Ellis' and Jason Howard's comic series Trees.

=== Postal TV series ===
A live action television adaptation of Postal from Matt Tolmach and Legendary Entertainment was in development in early 2016. The Walking Dead executive producer Seth Hoffman is writing the pilot script. After tough competition for the rights, it was picked up by Hulu in September 2016.

=== Wayward TV series ===
In 2017, the rights have been acquired by United Kingdom company Manga Entertainment in order to develop a Japanese animated or live action series based on Wayward.

=== Enormous TV series ===
In 2017, 20th Century Fox Television ordered a pilot episode written by André Øvredal, based on the comic series Enormous. After watching the pilot, FOX abandoned the series.

=== Crosswind TV series ===
In 2017, Entertainment One ordered a pilot based on Gail Simone's comic series Crosswind, with Vanessa Piazza as showrunner and executive producer.

=== Danger Girl TV series ===
In November 2017, Constantin Film acquired the rights to develop Danger Girl as a potential TV series, in partnership with Askarieh's Prime Universe Films and Jeremy Bolt's Bolt Pictures.

=== East of West / Transhuman TV series ===
In April 2018, Amazon Studios, Skybound Entertainment, and Jonathan Hickman announced to develop an hour long series based on East of West and Transhuman.

=== Injection TV series ===
In 2018, Warren Ellis' comic series Injection has been optioned for television by Universal Cable Productions.

=== Roche Limit TV series ===
In 2018, Orphan Black series writer Will Pascoe was set as the showrunner for an adaptation of Michael Moreci's comic series Roche Limit.

=== Bone TV series ===
In October 2019, the Bone comics were set up by Netflix for an animated series after Warner's turnaround of the project. However, in April 2022, production on the series was canceled during a reorganization of Netflix Animation.

== Video games ==
=== Youngblood ===
A Youngblood video game, an isometric action game similar to Crusader: No Remorse, was in development by Realtime Associates for the PlayStation and PC in 1997, with GT Interactive as the publisher.

=== Luchadores 5 ===
In 2011, a Luchadores 5 video game option had been acquired by Biodroid Entertainment.

== See also ==
- Image Comics
- List of Image Comics publications
- Image Universe
- List of television series and films based on Image Comics publications
- List of unproduced Dark Horse Comics projects
- List of unproduced film projects based on Marvel Comics
  - List of unproduced television projects based on Marvel Comics
  - List of unproduced films based on Marvel Comics imprints publications
- List of unproduced DC Comics projects
  - List of unproduced films based on DC Comics imprints
