= Suitor Armor =

Webcomic by Purpah

- Author: Purpah
- Website: Suitor Armor on Webtoon
- Current status/schedule: Ongoing
- Publisher(s): Webtoon, Ten Speed Graphic
- Genre(s): Fantasy, Romance

Suitor Armor is a fantasy romance webcomic by Purpah. It has been published digitally on Webtoon since 2020, and in print by Ten Speed Graphic since 2024.

== Plot ==
Lucia, the lady-in-waiting of the king's betrothed Lady Kirsi, is forced to hide her wings and pointed ears to mask her true identity as a fairy, who are at war with the human kingdom. When court magician Norrix reveals a suit of armor he brought to life with his magic, Lucia discovers the armor, whom she calls Modeus, is more aware than it initially appears.

== Release ==
Suitor Armor was originally self-published on Webtoon's Canvas platform for independent creators before Purpah was contacted by the company to make the series a Webtoon Original. The relaunched comic begin publishing weekly on Webtoon in September 2020. Starting in 2025, the series was adapted into voiced video episodes.

=== Print ===
In 2024, it was announced that Ten Speed Graphic would be adapting the series for print. The first volume was published on November 12th, 2024.

Volumes
| Volume | Date | Episodes | ISBN | References |
|---|---|---|---|---|
| 1 | November 12, 2024 | 1-17 | ISBN 9780593835630 | |
| 2 | May 20, 2025 | 18-38 | ISBN 9780593835661 | |
| 3 | August 12, 2025 | 39-51 | ISBN 9780593835692 | |

The first three print volumes contain an additional story showing how two major supporting characters, Baynard and Peres, became a couple.

== Reception ==
Both Booklist and School Library Journal gave the first print volume a starred review. Nick Taylor on The Hub, a blog for the Young Adult Library Services Association, noted how Purpah explored "the history of this fantasy world while keeping the pace quick and the story beats character-focused", and compared the series to Beauty and the Beast, Nimona, James Tynion IV's Wynd, and Sleepless.

C. M. Ramsburg of Comic Book Resources gave the first print volume a rating of 8 out of 10 stars, praising the art and side characters, though the reviewer was critical of the large amount of solid-colored backgrounds and the absence of a table of chapters.

Rebekah Ilo of Philstar Life noted the comic's focus on depicting healthy romantic relationships, pointing out a scene where Lucia becomes upset at Modeus for saying he was made for her, the Full Metal Alchemist-like magic system, and the inclusion of queer characters.

The first volume was included in the 2026 Great Graphic Novels for Teens list.
