= Invisible Republic =

Invisible Republic may refer to:

- Invisible Republic (book)
- Invisible Republic (album)
- Invisible Republic (comics)
