= Paradigm (comics) =

Comic book series

- Cover of the first issue

Publication information
- Publisher: Two Irish Guys Press; Image Comics
- Format: Ongoing series
- Publication date: September 2002 – November 2003
- No. of issues: 12

Creative team
- Written by: Matthew Cashel
- Artist: Jeremy Haun
- Letterer: Ed Lavallee

Collected editions
- Segue To An Interlude: ISBN 1-58240-319-8

Paradigm is a comic book series by Matthew Cashel and Jeremy Haun.

== Publication history ==
After its initial publication run with Two Irish Guys Press, it was licensed by Image Comics. Following issue #12 the series went on hiatus.

== Collected editions ==
The series is being collected into trade paperbacks:

- Segue To An Interlude (collects Paradigm #1–4, 156 pages, October 2003, ISBN 1-58240-319-8)
