= Plastic (comics) =

2017 series by Doug Wagner

- Cover art for Plastic #1 by Doug Wagner. Art by Daniel Hillyard. All Image Comics characters are trademarks of and copyright 2008 Image Comics or their respective owners.

Publication information
- Publisher: Image Comics
- Schedule: Monthly
- Format: Limited series
- Genre: Crime
- Publication date: April 2017 - August 2017
- No. of issues: 5
- Main character(s): Edwyn Stoffgruppen; Virginia

Creative team
- Created by: Doug Wagner
- Written by: Doug Wagner
- Artist(s): Daniel Hillyard
- Colorist(s): Laura Martin

Plastic is a 5-issue creator-owned horror American comic book limited series written by Doug Wagner, illustrated by Daniel Hillyard, and colored by Laura Martin. The story follows retired serial killer Edwyn Stoffgruppen, who has been trying to avoid trouble while on honeymoon with his love Virginia (a sex doll). The American company Image Comics published Plastic on a monthly basis, with the first issue released on 19 April 2017 and the fifth and final issue released on 23 August 2017. A prequel miniseries, Plastic: Death & Dolls, began publication on 12 June 2024.

== Publication history ==
The series consisted of five issues with the final issue published on August 23, 2017. The first issue released with positive initial reviews and three print-runs on the initial issue. A prequel miniseries, Plastic: Death & Dolls, began publication on June 12, 2024.

== Plot ==
Plastic follows retired serial killer Edwyn Stoffgruppen and the love of his life Virginia, a sex doll he "met online", as they travel across America. Edwyn stopped killing in pursuit of Virginia's affection until a Louisiana business magnate kidnapped Virginia and demanded Edwyn kill again to gain her freedom.

=== Release Schedule ===
Plastic Issues
Title	Publication date	Diamond ID
Plastic #1	April 29, 2017	FEB170551
Plastic #2	May 4, 2017	MAR170769
Plastic #3	June 21, 2017	APR170847
Plastic #4	July 17, 2017	MAY170698
Plastic #5	August 23, 2017	JUN170781

== Collected editions ==
The series was released as a single trade paperback on October 18, 2017.

== Reception ==
=== Reprints ===
Initial reception of the series appears optimistic with reviewers often citing the twisted and absurd storytelling. It proved so popular that Image Comics announced another print run a day after its initial release and once more a month later.

=== Critical reception ===
Robert Kirkman has been recounted saying that Plastic is "The weirdest shit I've ever read. I love it!".

== Characters ==
Edwyn Stoffgruppen
A delusional drifter trying to remain below the radar as he wanders from town to town with his love Virginia, Edwyn was a serial killer nicknamed "The Baggy Man" for his obsession with plastic, whose modus operandi was to decapitate those he considered offensive to his unique sensibilities and leave their severed heads in Ziploc bags, but he has since retired since starting a relationship with Virginia.

Virginia
A plastic sex doll who is the object of Edwyn's affection.
