= Sleepless (comics) =

Comic book by Sarah Vaughn and Leila del Duca

- Cover to Sleepless: Book 1 Art by Leila del Duca

Publication information
- Publisher: Image Comics
- Schedule: Monthly
- Format: Limited series
- Genre: Fantasy
- Publication date: December 2017 – January 2019
- No. of issues: 11

Creative team
- Written by: Sarah Vaughn
- Penciller: Leila del Duca
- Letterer: Deron Bennett
- Colorist: Alissa Sallah
- Editor: Alissa Sallah

Collected editions
- Book 1: ISBN 978-1534306844
- Book 2: ISBN 978-1534310582

Sleepless is an American comic book created by writer Sarah Vaughn and artist Leila del Duca. It was initially serialized in eleven issues published by Image Comics between December 2017 and January 2019, then reprinted in two paperback collections. The creators worked with colorist and editor Alissa Sallah and letterer Deron Bennett.

Set in a medieval kingdom, the fantasy story is about Lady "Poppy" Pyppenia, the illegitimate daughter of the recently deceased king. Poppy and Cyrenic, her personal protector who does not need sleep because of a magic spell, are unsure if they have a place in the royal court when Poppy's uncle becomes the new king. When assassins target Poppy, she believes they were sent by the new king's daughter and nephew out of fear she will try to usurp the throne.

== Publication history ==
=== Development ===
Prior to working on Sleepless, writer Sarah Vaughn had previously created the webcomic Sparkshooter and co-wrote the fifteen-issue Image comic series Alex + Ada with Jonathan Luna from 2013 to 2015. The initial concept for Sleepless came to her when she had trouble falling asleep, and she developed it over the course of a few years. Vaughn was approached by artist Leila del Duca, who was working on the Image comic series Shutter, about collaborating on a romance comic at the 2015 New York Comic Con. Vaughn sent del Duca a short list of story pitches, and she selected the one that became Sleepless. When del Duca's saw her work schedule would open up in early 2017, the two submitted the idea to Image. The publisher liked it and the series was officially announced on March 2 at the Image Expo segment of the 2017 Emerald City Comic Con.

=== Production ===
When Vaughn and del Duca began working on the project, they recruited Alissa Sallah, an intern at del Duca's art studio, to be their colorist and editor. A piece written by Sallah had been published in the Image comic book Bitch Planet: Triple Feature, but Sleepless was her first big art job in the comics industry. Both del Duca and Sallah were involved with any changes to the plot.

They based their fantasy world on cultures from the early 16th century. Unlike typical medieval fantasy settings which are derived from Northern European cultures, Sleepless is a combination of Mediterranean and North African cultures, particularly Moroccan culture. The artist's initial research included watching The Borgia, Ever After, and other films with a similar setting. Then she began mixing in Moroccan patterns and designs. The uncommon inspiration allowed the team more freedom in their designs. In addition to the nontraditional visuals, both leads are non-whites, which is unusual in the genre, and the plot subverts traditional female roles in fantasy by having their decisions and actions be vital to plot twists.

Sallah colored del Duca's line art with a simple wash style to enhance del Duca's emotive lines, and avoided using saturated color to maintain the Old World setting. Their letterer, Deron Bennett, created a unique font specifically for Sleepless. The logo was designed by del Duca, who started with medieval typography before trying to make it "feel sleepy and flowing". Within the context of the story, the creative team intentionally kept magic subtle and mysterious. Image assigned the comic a "young adult" rating instead of the more common "mature" label, but the creators did not intentionally tone down elements to achieve it.

=== Publication ===
The first issue was released digitally and to comic specialty shops on December 6, 2017. Estimated physical sales of the first issue were around 9,500 copies, putting it the 174th position on the month's sales-by-units chart. Sales fell steadily with each new monthly issue, and the sixth issue had estimated sales of 2,900 copies in May 2018, putting in at the 381st chart position. There was a four-month gap between publication of issues six and seven. During the break, Image made a digital version of the first issue available for free. A paperback collection of the first six issues was released July 11, 2018. When the series returned to monthly installments after its hiatus, estimated sales had fallen another 300 units, or ten percent.

Vaughn and del Duca intended to finish the series. The conclusion had been planned from the beginning, as Vaughn prefers to write stories that are complete and definite rather than being serialized without end. Although initially expected to run twelve issues, the series concluded at issue eleven. The final issue sold an estimated 2,200 copies. A second paperback volume released on March 13, 2019, collected the final five issues.

== Synopsis ==
=== Characters ===
- Lady "Poppy" Pyppenia is a teenager and the illegitimate daughter of the King Vareto of Harbeny and the court's foreign-aligned fortune teller, Amena of Mribesh. During her father's reign, Poppy enjoyed an active role in the royal court.
- Cyrenic is a member of the Sleepless Knights, men who use magic to shorten their lives in exchange for a state of constant wakefulness. Unlike other members of the order who are pledged to the throne, Cyrenic made his vow directly to Poppy at her father's request following an assassination attempt on her life several years before the story begins. The spell is beginning to have side effects, and Cyrenic believes he will soon enter a sleeping state from which other knights have never awoken.
- King Surno is Poppy's uncle on her father's side and has lived in Edtland for many years. When Poppy's father dies, Surno returns and is crowned king of Harbeny.
- Queen Dowager Leotta is the widow of the late King Verato. She was supportive of Verato's relationship with Amena, and thinks of Poppy as a daughter figure.
- Princess Rellen is Surno's only child. She is near Poppy's age and has prominent scars on her face due to acne.
- Lord Helder is Surno's nephew by marriage. He aspires to be Surno's heir.
- Lord Otrano was an advisor to Poppy's father, and his services are retained following the coronation of King Surno.

=== Themes and symbolism ===
According to the creators, time is the most important theme in the story. Critics also identified agency, sleep, dreams, memories, and death as prominent themes. Poppy's name is an allusion to opium, which is made from poppy flowers. Opium was used to help people sleep in medieval times, and this led to the flower becoming a common symbol of sleep and death.

=== Plot ===
Book One

Following the death of her father, the king, Poppy is uncertain of her place in the royal court and wishes to travel to her country estate or her mother's homeland. She makes a formal request to King Surno at his coronation, but that night an assassin attacks her and Cyrenic in the castle. Poppy believes Princess Rellen was behind the attack to prevent Poppy from trying to usurp the throne. Surno denies her travel request, saying she will be safest if she remains with him. To celebrate the new king, a tournament of knights is held in his honor. To gain the favor of Surno and Rellen, Poppy grants her chooses Lord Helder as her champion in the competition. Cyrenic defeats Helder, winning the tournament. His prize is a walk with the king at a time of Cyrenic's choosing. The tournament is followed by a feast, where Poppy's pet alerts her to poison on her plate. Shortly thereafter, Poppy has a private conversation with Rellen, confessing that she only wants to leave Harbeny and bears Rellen no ill will. Rellen reveals she has a bracelet that tells her when people are lying to her, then admits that her concerns about Poppy had been fed by Helder. Together, they suspect Helder is behind the two assassination attempts.

On the way back to her chamber, two more assassins attack but are killed by Cyrenic. Before dying, one confesses that Helder hired them. Poppy and Cyrenic go to the king, who is already meeting with Helder. King Surno suggests the two of them marry to legitimize Poppy's place in the court before Poppy explains what the assassin told her. Surno calls for Rellen, who uses her bracelet to monitor Helder's responses. Rellen admits Helder's careful denials are true, but the king ignores her when she requests to ask more direct questions. Frustrated by these developments and worried he will be unable to protect Poppy if his wakefulness spell falters and he falls asleep, Cyrenic plans to murder Helder. Poppy voices her love for Cyrenic and begs him not to do something that will cause his death. He kisses her in return, but refuses to change his mind. With no other way to stop him, Poppy recites the incantation that releases Cyrenic from his vow. He immediately falls into a deep sleep.

Book Two

One year later, Cyrenic is still asleep. Court physicians do not know what to expect because no Sleepless Knight has ever been released before. His body has been moved to the crypt where former Sleepless Knights are also kept. No other threats to Poppy's life have arisen, and plans for her marriage to Helder have moved forward despite Poppy's continued suspicions. Cyrenic awakens, but it takes him time to adjust to his new condition. In addition to being rested, his body is weak and his mind is uncertain because his vow no longer guides his actions. His relationship with Poppy sours over her coming marriage.

After Poppy and Helder are married, they retire to his bed chamber to consummate their union. With Poppy's prompting, Helder admits that he was behind the assassination attempts, but he now hopes they can rule together. Poppy tells him she has no intention of assisting him, and will actively work against him for the rest of his life. Helder moves to attack her, but she evades him and bloodies his nose. She flees, letting him be seen chasing her through the castle. Cyrenic sees her and helps her escape. Lord Otrano appears behind Helder and chastises him for failing before pushing him over a ledge to his death. He then spreads rumors among the uncertain witnesses that Poppy pushed him with Cyrenic's help. King Surno organizes a search party to locate Poppy and Cyrenic with orders to kill them.

Poppy and Cyrenic sneak back into the castle to find out who has betrayed them. Guards loyal to Otrano capture them and he explains that her country estate used to belong to his fiancé and be part of another kingdom. When his fiancé's family supported an enemy of Harbeny, Poppy's father annexed the estate, removed record of her family, and granted the land to Poppy. Otrano has wanted revenge ever since, and he has been behind all the assassination attempts on Poppy's life, including the one years ago that led to Cyrenic guarding her. King Surno is called to witness their executions, but Cyrenic reminds him of his prize from the tournament and demands they take their walk before he is put to death. Cyrenic recounts what Otrano told them, and Surno believes the truth. Otrano is executed. Poppy and Cyrenic travel to her country estate to live in peace.

== Reception ==
Sleepless received largely positive reviews upon release and throughout its run. Although some plot elements were criticized for being cliché, most critics praised Poppy's memorable characterization and del Duca's distinctive art. Reviews were split on the effectiveness of the story's narrative pace and the handling of expository dialogue. The series appeared on numerous critics' "Best of 2018" lists and was frequently described as one of the best fantasy comics. Poppy was singled out as one of the most memorable female protagonists of 2018 by Barnes & Noble.

The first issue began in medias res with three nearly silent pages with much subtle foreshadowing. ComicBook.com called it "ideal" and credited the narrative pace for its success. The story's structure was compared to a Shakespearean drama by Adventures in Poor Taste. The amount of exposition divided critics, with Comics Beat believing it was well-handled while Bleeding Cool thought there was too much. The issue lacked a cliffhanger or unexpected twist, which led Comic Book Resources to conclude the story might read better in longer installments.

Poppy's depiction was praised throughout the series for being memorable, compelling, and relatable. The romance between her and Cyrenic was well executed according to Comics Beat, but Bleeding Cool compared it to Jane Austen novels and called it "common and dull". In a later review, Comic Bastards acknowledged the cliché elements, but argued the world the team has built was fascinating enough to overcome that weakness.

Later elements of the story were contrasted with other modern comic series. Multiversity Comics took special note of how effective the narrative ellipsis between issues six and seven was, which is a plot device infrequently used successfully in comic books. Both Comics Beat and ComicBook.com appreciated the self-contained nature of the story in an industry where most stories are continuing, interconnected, or both.

Many critics applauded del Duca's artwork. Black Nerd Problems said the art is what set the comic apart from others, and Comic Bastards said the art had a fairy tale quality perfectly suited to the story. The character's costumes were called "beautiful" and "ornate", and del Duca's linework was described as "intricate". Many important story elements are nonverbal, and Comic Bastards felt del Duca's layouts did an excellent job of guiding a reader's eye to prevent those points from being overlooked. Bleeding Cool agreed with this sentiment, adding that illustrating emotion appears to be del Duca's specialty. Reviewers disagreed on how best to describe the style, with some comparing it to paintings while others compared it to Art Nouveau or woodblock prints. Adventures in Poor Taste thought Sallah's colors were too dull, but Multiversity Comics felt they were "exotic" and Comic Bastards thought they complemented the artwork well.
