= Ultra (comics) =

Comics by Jonathan and Joshua Luna

- Cover to the first printing of the collected edition of Ultra, art by Jonathan Luna.

Publication information
- Publisher: Image Comics
- Schedule: Monthly
- Format: Limited series
- Genre: Superhero
- Publication date: August 2004 – March 2005
- No. of issues: 8

Creative team
- Created by: Luna Brothers
- Written by: Joshua Luna
- Artist: Jonathan Luna

Collected editions
- Soft cover: ISBN 1-58240-483-6
- Hard cover: ISBN 1-58240-484-4

Ultra is the first American comic book created by Jonathan and Joshua Luna. Image Comics originally published it as an eight-issue limited series between August 2004 and March 2005 before releasing it as a single volume in both hardcover and softcover formats. The series received mostly positive reviews for both the artwork and the story. A television adaptation was attempted in 2006, but was unsuccessful and the brothers remain in talks to try again.

The main character is Pearl Penalosa, a Latina superhero in Spring City. The plot follows her and two superhero friends as they deal with celebrity and seek happy love lives after receiving predictions from a fortune teller. Traditional superhero themes such as fighting crime are treated as a background setting instead of a primary focus. Critics often drew comparisons to the television show Sex and the City.

== Publication history ==
=== Development ===
After graduating from the Savannah College of Art and Design with Bachelor of Fine Arts degrees, the Luna Brothers were inspired to create comics in mature genres by Garth Ennis's Preacher and other publications from Vertigo Comics. Jonathan had the original idea for a story about three guys and their dating life. Joshua changed the characters to women instead and added superhero and corporate aspects. Because they wanted to keep the story accessible to readers who did not grow up reading comic books, they used the superhero genre as a setting instead of a primary plot element. One theme the Luna Brothers explored was how absurd the media can be. They cited Chuck Palahniuk's Invisible Monsters as an influence.

After developing a loose plot together, Joshua wrote the full scripts and suggested layouts. Ultra was the first comic book Joshua wrote. From there, Jonathan did the pencils by hand with a mechanical pencil and inks with a Micron pen. After scanning the inked artwork and editing it where needed on a Wacom tablet, he would add the colors and letters. He worked at an average rate of one page per day. They were able to make one full issue every four weeks. The Lunas described the creation of Ultra as "organic", admitting they had a plan but saying they "figured out a lot of things as [they] were doing them". A plot synopsis and a five-page sample of the comic was submitted blindly to and accepted by Image Comics publisher Erik Larsen.

When Jonathan was brainstorming cover ideas, he knew the cover needed to "show that Pearl was this icon – everyone knew her". He based the design on Time magazine because it was "such a great fit". Later issues continued the theme by parodying other popular magazines like Rolling Stone, Maxim, and Vogue. The Lunas expanded on the magazine theme by including fake advertisements and mock-interviews with various characters in the book styled after the magazine being parodied.

=== Publication ===
The first issue was released August 11, 2004. Retailers ordered over 8,000 copies, making the issue the 171st most ordered comic for the month. These numbers happily surprised the Lunas because they were not known creators. When the final issue was released in March 2005, orders had fallen but were still close to the 8,000 mark, which is a significantly lower drop than the industry average. In May 2005, the miniseries was collected in one paperback volume. A limited hardcover edition with a print run of 300 was released at the same time, and those sold quickly. A second printing of the paperback was later released with an alternate cover design. In September 2011, a deluxe hardcover was released in an oversized format with a slipcase.

Fans of Ultra were open about liking it and sent a significant amount of correspondence to Image and the Luna Brothers. The series was intended as a finite story, but its success prompted Image to ask the creators to continue the story. Instead, they chose to move on to a different project, Girls, which began in May 2005.

== Plot summary ==
In Spring City, Pearl Penalosa is one of several superheroes. Most superheroes, including Pearl, have public identities and are treated like celebrities. They have agents, product endorsements, and a bureaucracy that schedules their working shifts to ensure proper coverage. Because she has been single for five years after a public relationship with popular superhero Captain Steel, she has been adopted as a model of abstinence. Partly because of this image, Pearl has been nominated for "Best Heroine of the Year" in the 77th annual Superhero Awards. On Thursday night, one week before the award ceremony, Pearl is out with her friends and fellow superheroes Olivia Arancina and Jennifer Janus. At Olivia’s insistence, the three women visit a fortune teller who tells them that within seven days, Jennifer will "receive what she has given" and Pearl will "find true love". The final prediction excites Olivia and Jennifer, but Pearl dismisses it as a scam.

Pearl decides her fortune was real after a man in a restaurant gives her his phone number. Her friends help her to dress sexy for the event, which causes Pearl particular embarrassment when the paparazzi find them and begin taking pictures. Pearl and her date escape to his apartment, where they have sex. She begins telling her friends that she is in love. When she returns to work, she learns that while she was sleeping after sex, her date took several selfies with her and sold them, along with his story of what happened, to a tabloid.

When Pearl is called to assist with an attack by a super villain, she is unable to prevent the death of several police officers. Distraught, Pearl seeks solitude, but Jennifer finds her and tries to lift her spirits. Jennifer reminds Pearl about her own fortune, and claims that their two fortunes are related. Jennifer reveals her romantic feelings for Pearl and kisses her. Pearl is too shocked to respond.

Pearl receives an emergency call when another super villain attacks. During the fight, Pearl sees Olivia caught in an explosion. Believing her friend dead, Pearl attacks the villain directly and suffers serious burns to her hands and face. She faints after she subdues him. She awakens in a hospital and finds herself healed except for her hair.

Despite the terrible attack, Pearl learns the Superhero Awards will still proceed as planned. When she arrives, she is booed by the crowd and mocked for her "new haircut". One member of the audience defends her and shames the crowd for its behavior. As Pearl enters the ceremony, the crowd has begun chanting her name, but the award she was nominated for goes to Jennifer. At the after party, Jennifer tells Pearl that this award must have been her fortune.

Pearl returns to her penthouse apartment. She is visited by Captain Steel, who says he has been thinking about her recently and regrets their breakup. When he says that he still loves her and would like to have a relationship with her again, Pearl declines. The next night, she goes to a nightclub with Olivia and Jennifer. They have fun joking about the fortunes, and Pearl admits she is a little sad hers did not come true. Pearl goes to a coffee house and cries when the fortune's deadline passes without anyone talking to her. Friday morning, Pearl is leaving for work when she meets a man who is about to knock on her door. He says he works at the coffee house she visited, and that she left her wallet behind. After a conversation, Pearl and the man arrange a date.

== Critical reception ==
The series debuted to positive reviews, with critics praising both the storytelling and the artwork. Reviewer Matthew Melikhov described Ultra as "a borderline romantic comedy featuring super heroines". Several reviewers drew comparisons to the Sex and the City television show, such as Mario Anima who dubbed the comic book "Spandex Sex in the City". The reviews at The A.V. Club and IGN noted the Luna Brothers' skill at writing recognizably real people and capturing a character's humanity. Writing for ComicsAlliance, Laura Hudson said that while many comics "deal with the idea of superheroes as modern-day celebrities", none "focus on the relentless commercialism and pitfalls of fame quite like Ultra". Anima described the internal layouts as "cinematic". Although Melikhov described Ultra as "entertaining", he went on to say that it was "probably not worth a second read".

== In other media ==
During publication, the Luna Brothers promoted new issues on their website with animations of each issue's opening scenes. The animation work was done by their friend Giancarlo Yerkes. In 2011, they created a live-action ad to promote the deluxe hardcover.

In January 2006, a television adaptation of Ultra was announced as being in development by producer Barbara Hall for CBS. In February, Lena Headey was cast as Ultra. A pilot episode was made, but CBS chose not to carry the show. When asked about the failed pilot in a 2008 interview with The A.V. Club, Joshua said the pilot "just wasn't good". He went on to say the script was a large departure from the comic book, such as the unexplained name change from Pearl to Penny and the removal of Aphrodite and Cowgirl. He described the pilot as being Ultra in name only.

In 2007, the brothers spoke to director Stephen Hopkins about moving forward with an adaptation again, but it became stuck in development hell. The Lunas were in talks for an Ultra television project in 2011.
