= Alex + Ada =

Comic book series by Jonathan Luna and Sarah Vaughn

- Issue one cover

Publication information
- Publisher: Image Comics
- Genre: Science fiction
- Publication date: November 2013 – June 2015
- No. of issues: 15

Creative team
- Created by: Jonathan Luna; Sarah Vaughn
- Written by: Jonathan Luna; Sarah Vaughn
- Artist: Jonathan Luna

Collected editions
- Vol 1 (#1-#5): ISBN 1632150069
- Vol 2 (#6-#10): ISBN 1632151952
- Vol 3 (#11-#15): ISBN 1632154048

Alex + Ada is an American comic book series created by Jonathan Luna and Sarah Vaughn. The duo began work on the series in January 2013, before publishing 15 issues through Image Comics between November 2013 and June 2015. The series has since been collected into three trade paperbacks.

Alex + Ada centers upon the relationship between a lonely man and an intelligent android. The series received positive reviews from critics who compared it to other popular science fiction stories, although Luna's artwork was sometimes criticized for being simplistic.

== Publication history ==
=== Development ===
Jonathan Luna had previously created comics with his brother Joshua, but was exhausted after six straight years of work. Inspired by a TED Talk, he decided to take a break from working. During his two years away from comics, he painted Star Bright and the Looking Glass, a fairy tale picture book that was proofread by his friend Sarah Vaughn and published in 2012.

While working on the picture book, Luna realized he missed telling a story panel by panel and decided to return to comics. He and his brother had decided to work on separate projects, so Luna pitched the idea of a young man who falls in love with a female android to Vaughn over dinner. Vaughn, who began writing and drawing romance comics in her youth, jumped at the opportunity.

After initializing the concept in January 2013, the two discussed the project for three or four months before creating an outline for the whole story. The original outline was for 12 issues, but it left room for improvisation and a few points were removed as the story progressed. They looked at past and present social movements for civil rights for inspiration for how one would progress and how people might respond to a movement for android rights. Luna wrote the first draft of issue one, then the two worked together to rewrite it.

Luna began drawing around April. Alex + Ada is the first comic Luna drew completely digitally. Because Luna needed to focus on art, Vaughn wrote the first draft of the remaining issues. She and Luna would discuss the draft, then she would rewrite it.

=== Publication ===
The first issue of Alex + Ada was released on November 6, 2013, and was Vaughn's first published comic work. It was the 141st best selling issue of the month with estimated sales around 15,000, which was more than any book Luna had done previously. During the course of publication, the series length was increased from 12 issues to 15 issues. Each issue was released approximately six weeks apart, with the final issue available June 18, 2015. Issue 15 was the 206th best selling issue of the month with estimated orders around 8,250. The series has been collected into three trade paperbacks, each containing five issues.

== Plot ==
Alex is a young man who is depressed after his fiancée breaks up with him. Tired of seeing him unhappy, Alex's grandmother sends him Ada, a Tanaka X-5 android which is capable of intelligent human interaction. The robot is initially incapable of self-awareness, as each android has a program that blocks any potential free thought or consciousness.

Alex decides to remove this inhibition and grant Ada her own mental freedom, as he is uninterested in a partner who cannot truly interact with him. Because removing the program is illegal and carries harsh consequences for both Ada and Alex, they have to pretend Ada is not self-aware. When a jealous love-interest of Alex reports Ada as sentient to the FBI, Alex and Ada attempt to flee the country. When they are intercepted by the FBI, Ada gets shot by the police and Alex is arrested. He is convicted and sentenced to 25 years in prison, but Ada is not found to be sentient.

During his time in prison, rights are granted to sentient robots. On Alex's release, Ada is returned to him. She appears to be non-sentient, but Alex discovers she locked her consciousness to protect him. He restores her freedom and is re-united with her.

== Reception ==
According to review aggregator Comic Book Round Up, critics gave the first issue an average 8.0/10 and the series as a whole 8.5/10. During its publication, Alex + Ada appeared on many "best of" lists created by comic news websites.

Reviewing for Bleeding Cool, Zac Thompson and David Dissanayake made favorable comparisons to the 1982 film Blade Runner and the 2013 film Her. Dissanayake also noted the entertaining realism, as it "feels like our world, full of technologies that...will [exist] very soon". Comic Book Resources' Sonia Harris also praised the series for its realism, writing the "metaphor of artificially intelligent beings living out their secret lives, unsafe and insecure, yet potentially stronger and smarter than humans is potent". Dean Stell, a reviewer for Weekly Comic Book Review, said Luna and Vaughn created "a wonderful and classically-themed science-fiction story". Writing for Bloody Disgusting, Lonnie Nadler said Luna's work on facial expressions was the "major highlight" of his illustrations.

Luna's simplistic artwork is a frequent point of criticism among reviewers, although some call it appropriate for the setting. In addition to Luna's "painfully plain" illustrations, Newsarama's David Pepose also criticized the story's pace.

Alex + Ada prompted artist Leila del Duca to approach Vaughn about collaborating on a romance comic at the 2015 New York Comic Con. They eventually created Sleepless, which began in November 2017.
