= The Humans (comic) =

American comic book series by Keenan Marshall Keller and Tom Neely

Publication information
- Publisher: Image Comics
- Schedule: Monthly
- Format: Ongoing series
- Genre: Anthropomorphic; Crime; Fantasy
- Publication date: November 2014 – present
- No. of issues: 11

Creative team
- Created by: Keenan Marshall Keller; Tom Neely
- Written by: Keenan Marshall Keller
- Artist: Tom Neely
- Colorist: Kristina Collantes

The Humans is an ongoing American comic book series from Image Comics created by writer Keenan Marshall Keller (Galactic Breakdown) and artist Tom Neely (All Crime Comics, Henry & Glenn Forever, Popeye).

== Plot ==
The series focuses on the Humans, an outlaw biker gang based in an alternate 1970s Bakersfield, California, in an alternate universe where the dominant species are anthropomorphic apes, and humans (called "Skins") are used as pets or slaves, similar and Spiritual Successor to Planet of the Apes.

=== Humans For Life (Issues #0-4) ===
The Bakersfield charter of the Humans MC consists of brothers Bobby and Johnny Moore, Marra, Karns, Crispin, Mojo, Doc, Nada, and Bricks.

As the Humans MC gathers to bury Mojo, a rival club called the Skabbs shows up and a fight ensues. The Humans finish the rumble, with Bobby defeating the Skabbs' president by punching his head through Mojo's headstone. Continuing the wake, the Humans return to their clubhouse at Mighty Joe's Junkyard and party around a funeral pyre they erect for Mojo's bike. As the party continues, Johnny, recently returned from Vietnam, rejoins the crew.

The next day, Bobby wakes Johnny from his nightmares of the war to introduce him to his idea for striking it big with a newly created drug called "Spazm" - a hallucinogenic form of speed created by Doc. Bobby plans to use the profits of the drug to get out from under the thumb of their boss, Abe Simian.

After Johnny is reunited with his bike, Moonbeam, the Humans attend a "Skin fight" (human cockfighting) at Abe's business, Flex Trucking. A meeting is held in Abe's office, consisting of Abe and the presidents of three MCs: Bobby of the Humans, Marcus of the Haterz, and Reeko Santini of the Madfückers. Abe hires the Humans to deliver two truckloads of the Haterz' cannabis from their Oakland charter to the Madfückers in Los Angeles, then deliver the Madfückers' five-crate meth shipment to Bakersfield.

Wanting a bigger cut for all the risk, Bobby initially demands from Abe ten percent of the profits. When Abe asks for a wager, Bobby's best skin against his, Bobby asks for fifteen percent if he wins, or the Humans will do both runs for free. To win the fight, Bobby injects one of their fighters with Spazm.

=== Volume 2 (Issues #5-10) ===
As the Humans make the run to LA, they fight off Victor's Legion, a gang of desert bandits who attempt to hijack the convoy. After losing Moonbeam and Bobby's bike, The Governor, the Humans survive the hijack attempt and successfully deliver the drugs to LA. While in the city, the Humans party at the Madfückers MC clubhouse, while Crispin accompanies Johnny on his ride to reunite with his long-lost love, Peg, who now strips at the Forbidden Zone in Oildale.

After calling out and ditching Crispin, Johnny rides alone to the Forbidden Zone, where he gets drunk while waiting for Peg to arrive for her shift. As he waits, a few locals pick a fight with him, nearly setting him on fire before being saved by the club's staff. Later, Peg arrives for her shift, surprised to find Johnny there. Back in Bakersfield at Flex Trucking, Crispin makes a deal to help Abe finish the Humans once and for all.

== Characters ==
=== Humans MC ===
- Johnny Moore (c. 1948-) - the vice president of the Humans MC Bakersfield charter. He was long thought killed in action in the Vietnam War, and the scars he brings back from the jungle run deep. His bike was Moonbeam, destroyed during a skirmish against Victor's Legion.
- Karns (c. 1942-) - the weirdo and quiet killer, an ugly, mean, perverted, freak gorilla, but a Human through and through. His bike is the Mauler.
- Doc (c. 1931-) - the adviser and chemist, a smart, careful and caring old orangutan who refuses to slow down or grow up. His bike is the Go-Cart, with a beer-keg sidecar.
- Marra (c. 1945–1970) - the artist, poet and ladies 'mate, a pretty boy chimpanzee with a mean streak. He sees the poetry in violence and the freedom of the road. His bike is the Pequod.
- Nada (c. 1947–1970) - the joker, a wild-eyed, drug-rattled orangutan with a smile as sharp as his blade, and Johnny's best friend. His bike is Matilda.
- Crispin (c. 1941–1970) - the weasel and whiner, a crooked and lying gorilla who believes he should be president of the MC. His bike is the Dodger.
- Bobby Moore (c. 1940–1970) - the former president and original member of the Humans, and Johnny's older brother. A cool, in control chimp, his voice was loud and his words were gospel. He was the Humans' best fighter, and he was quick and street smart. His bike was the Governor, destroyed during a skirmish against Victor's Legion. Killed by Skuz and Woz of the Skabbs MC in issue #7.
- Bricks (c. 1944–1970) - the muscle and Skin-keeper, a gorilla as big as a house, but quiet as a mouse. His bike was the Monster Trike. Killed by the Skabbs MC in issue #7.
- Marvin "Mojo" Hopper (c. 1939–1970) - a gorilla full of piss, whiskey and hate, he was the best 'mate to watch someone's back. He lived for action and never said no to a rumble. His bike was Black Magik. Killed by Woz of the Skabbs MC pre-issue #1.
- Clyde (c. 1927-) - the mascot, Doc's soft-headed older brother.
- Peg - Johnny's girlfriend
- Queenie - Bobby's old lady
- Florence - Karns' Skin slave girl whom he named after his mother
- Cha-Cha - club property
- Snaks - club property
- Mols - club property

== Music ==
At the end of each issue is a newsletter that features two to three songs from bands contributing a soundtrack for the series, with each issue containing one volume of music. Each new track is added to the Humans Soundtrack SoundCloud page. With the release of issue #7, the creators revealed they had opened up submissions for bands to write original songs inspired by the comic for the soundtrack. With the deadline on October 25, 2015, the winning tracks were included in the SoundCloud soundtrack release for issue #10, and artist Tom Neely designed a T-shirt graphic for the winning bands.

=== The Humans Soundtrack ===
Artist/Band	Song	Issue/Volume
Zig Zags	Humans March (Let's Die)	1
Smelly Tongues	Live to Ride	1
Boss Kong	Ride to Die	2
Goblin Cock	Just Fucking Humans	2
Boss Kong	Viet-Kong	3
Fairlight Express	Outside in a Cage	3
Coliseum	Man Should Surrender	4
Wizard Rifle	Apes Bounce For Fux!/The Deuce Is Loose!	4
Gary Wrong Group	Warlords Willing Redux	5
Speedbuggy	Still Movin' On	5
Degreaser	Erase My Mind	6
Witches of God	Return of the Living Dead	6
Sun Trash	Electric Feather Hair	6
Folsom Keller	Humans	7
Apeshit Simians	Simian Stomp	7
Damien Blaise	Mojo's Funeral	7
Ghoul	Humans Till Deth	8
Heavy Lids	Fight It	8
Saviours	The Sacrifice	9
Imagine "the" Band & Die Rotzz	Nife Fite	9
Boss Kong	Ape Hanger	10
The Hip Priests^{1}	For Life Till Deth	10
Child Leash^{1}	Monkey Eye	10
Cadaver Pudding^{2}	Primacy	10
Thee Minks^{2}	Cavegirl Love	10
The Sorority^{2}	Reconnaissance By Fire	10
Scuzz^{2}	Nihilistic Vile Punks	10
Dark Palms^{2}	Ghost Horse	10
Apex Shrine^{2}	Can't Help Myself	10
Admiral Sir Cloudesley Shovell^{2}	Mean and Filthy	10

^{1} Battle of the Bands winner
^{2} Battle of the Bands honorary mention

=== Inspiration ===
Below are songs said to have inspired the writing for the comic.

Artist/Band	Song	Album
The Spits	Rip Up the Streets	The Spits IV: School's Out
Davie Allan & the Arrows	Blues' Theme	The Wild Angels (Music from the Soundtrack of the Motion Picture)
Ty Segall & White Fence	Easy Ryder	Hair
The Black Angels	Black Grease	Passover
Oblivians	Indian In Me	Best of the Worst: 93–97
Motörhead	Live to Win	Ace of Spades
Jerusalem	Hooded Eagle	Jerusalem
George Brigman	Don't Bother Me	Jungle Rot
Pretty Things	Grass	Parachute
Bizarros	Jackson's Pride	From Akron (w/ Rubber City Rebels)
Donovan	Cosmic Wheels	Cosmic Wheels
Brainbombs	After Acid	Burning Hell
Wizzard Sleeve	Mommy's Little Baby	Make the World Go Away
Midnight	I Am Violator	Complete and Total Hell
DMZ	Don't Jump Me Mother	DMZ LP
The Monkees	Can You Dig It	Head
The Screamers	I Wanna Hurt	In a Better World
Iggy and the Stooges	Gimme Danger	Raw Power
Bits of Shit	F	Cut Sleeves
Cuntz	Never Felt Better	Solid Mates
Mammoth	Mammoth	
Flower Travellin' Band	Satori, Pt. 2	Satori
Funkadelic	Maggot Brain	Maggot Brain
The Spits	Kill the Kool	Kill the Kool
