= Whispers (comics) =

Comic series by Joshua Luna

- Cover to Whispers #2, art by Joshua Luna

Publication information
- Publisher: Image Comics
- Schedule: Bimonthly
- Format: Limited Series
- Genre: horror / sci-fi
- Publication date: January 2012
- No. of issues: 6
- Main character: Sam Webber

Creative team
- Created by: Joshua Luna
- Written by: Joshua Luna
- Artist: Joshua Luna
- Letterer: Joshua Luna
- Colorist: Joshua Luna

Whispers is a bimonthly limited comic series created by Joshua Luna which ran for six issues. Image Comics began publishing it in January 2012.

Sam, a mentally troubled man, is suddenly empowered with the ability to leave his physical body in "ghost" form and manipulate people in strange and disturbing ways.

== Publication history ==
Luna typically works with his brother, Jonathan Luna, and Whispers is his first solo work. The story comes from Luna's fascination with the concepts of free will and control. He handles all duties in its creation, including writing, penciling, inking, lettering, and coloring.

The series was originally solicited as bi-monthly, but saw delays beginning with the third issue. The first issue was published in January, the second in March, and the third in June. Luna says the delays were due in part to a computer crash.

== Plot ==
Sam, who has obsessive–compulsive disorder (OCD), visits his ex-girlfriend Lily and her friends to help comfort her about her father, who is in a coma. He shares with them a dream he had where her father claimed to be happy.

That night, Sam discovers his spirit can leave his body and visit others. During these visits, he can hear people's thoughts and manipulate their decisions. He visits his mother, whom he persuades not to contact him. He then visits an old girlfriend, Vannessa, accidentally putting her in danger from her drug dealer. He decides to visit Lily to get closure from their failed relationship, but is unable to follow through. As he leaves her apartment, he encounters an evil presence which causes him to wake.

Sam tries to tell Lily about his abilities, but she does not believe him. When he returns home, he meets a friendly neighbor woman who does believe him, and she encourages him to investigate the evil presence further. That night, Sam does, and he discovers it to be a monster disguised as a human.

== Reception ==
Whispers debuted to mostly positive reviews. Walt Richardson of Multiversity Comics praised the characterization of Sam, but felt the supporting cast was weak.
