= Five Ghosts =

- Five Ghosts Volume 1

Publication information
- Publisher: Image Comics
- Genre: Action/adventure
- Publication date: March 2013

Creative team
- Written by: Frank J. Barbiere
- Artist(s): Chris Mooneyham (#1-5, #7-); Garry Brown (#6)

Five Ghosts is an ongoing comic book series chronicling the travels of treasure hunter Fabian Gray and his rare ability to harness the ghosts of five literary characters.

First issued in 2013 by publisher Image Comics, the comic was created by writer Frank J. Barbiere and artist Chris Mooneyham.

== Plot ==
The story focuses on Fabian Gray who suffers from a rare affliction, inflicted after an encounter with an artifact known as “The Dreamstone”. This encounter has given Gray the power to harness the abilities of five unnamed literary characters or “Ghosts” referred to as "The Wizard", "The Archer", "The Detective", "The Samurai" and "The Vampire". It has been suggested these correspond to Merlin, Robin Hood, Sherlock Holmes, Miyamoto Musashi, and Count Dracula.

== List of characters ==
- Fabian Gray
- Iago
- Sebastian
- Jezebel

== Adaptations ==
In October 2014, American television channel SyFy announced that a series based on the comic book was under development. The pilot will be produced by Universal Cable Productions, Black Mask Studios and BenderSpink.
