= Girls (comics) =

American comic book limited series

- Cover to Girls #1.

Publication information
- Publisher: Image Comics
- Schedule: Monthly
- Format: Limited series
- Genre: Horror, science fiction
- Publication date: May 2005 – April 2007
- No. of issues: 24
- Main character: Ethan Daniels

Creative team
- Created by: Jonathan and Joshua Luna

Collected editions
- Conception: ISBN 1-58240-529-8
- Emergence: ISBN 1-58240-608-1
- Survival: ISBN 1-58240-703-7
- Extinction: ISBN 1-58240-753-3
- The Complete Collection: ISBN 1-58240-826-2

Girls was an American monthly comic book limited series created by Jonathan and Joshua Luna, published by Image Comics between 2005 and 2007.

It tells the story of the people of Pennystown, a community of 63 who are cut off from the rest of the world and attacked by a group of naked, flesh eating, egg-laying women, as well as other bizarre dangers. The first issue was published in May 2005 and the last in April 2007, after 24 issues.

== Plot ==
After a young man named Ethan Daniels is thrown out of the bar in the town of Pennystown following a drunken misogynistic rant, he meets a mysterious, naked and injured woman out on the street. He takes her to his home, and after he tries unsuccessfully to get information from her, they have intercourse. He leaves her in his house the next day to report the situation to the local police officer, running across his ex-girlfriend Taylor in the process. They return to Ethan's home to find that the women he took in has laid eggs that hatch into full-grown identical copies of her. The Girls attack any other females they come across, forcing the townspeople to initially hide in their homes. The situation is complicated by a giant sperm-like monster in a cornfield and the discovery of an enormous reflective dome separating Pennystown from outside aid and from escaping. The townspeople are further stressed when the bridge collapses, killing many of them and demolishing almost all of the town's vehicles.

The townspeople are then attacked again and escape to a nearby farmhouse where they take advantage of the homeowner's hospitality by eating all of the food and running down the generator, much to her frustration. One of the men, Lester, is left behind at the bridge but later manages to make his way to where everyone is hiding. He initially tells everyone that he was attacked by the women but soon confesses that he had been injured by a moose and actually had sex with several of the Girls. This prompts Ethan to suggest that the Girls could lay eggs after intercourse, revealing that he had sex with the one he had taken home. This horrifies many of the women and upsets Taylor, who insisted that the two had been on a break rather than broken up. Tensions continue to rise, prompting the women and men to take sides based on their gender.

The men in the group end up taking some of the Girls prisoner, which ends up angering the women, who believe that they should be killed. This further alienates the women from the men, especially after it is discovered that one of the men had sex with one of the Girls. During a scuffle over the discovery, one of the men ends up striking his pregnant wife. This prompts one of the women, Nancy, to shoot his ear and lock most of the men into the shed after first killing the Girls. Some of the men, including Nancy's husband Kenny, escape into the woods. Kenny ends up having sex with several of the Girls and later tries to kill his wife when she discovers his wrongdoings after she and the others had been forced to leave the farmhouse.

Everyone eventually converges and it's discovered that the Girls had only been interested in the men for their semen. If they could not or would not copulate with them, the Girls would try to kill them as they did the women. This comes as a blow to many of the men, who had not taken the threat the Girls posed as seriously due to the idea that they would never be attacked. The book ultimately ends with the remaining townspeople killing off the rest of the Girls, which prompts the sperm monster to break the dome and shoot a beam into space. The surviving townspeople then mourn their dead friends and family as well as celebrate their survival as rain pours down on them. The scene then cuts to outer space, where another sperm monster is seen carrying another Girl to another planet.

== Development ==
The Lunas first began developing the idea for the series after Joshua Luna had a "random idea of a girl hatching out of an egg". The Lunas then began building on the idea of a "beautiful monster", also questioning what would happen if the girl in question began multiplying through clones and how it would affect both men and women. They stated that they chose to include themes of sexuality as well as gender issues and identification as a way of "[challenging] the way people thought" and that they wanted to make it as realistic as possible. The story's setting, the small fictional town of Pennystown, was chosen in order to keep the cast as small as possible.

== Reception ==
Critical reception for Girls was mostly positive. Comic Book Resources commented that the series "exemplifies the best traditions of classic indie comics" and The A.V. Club named it as one of their "Best Comics Of 2007". The Lunas noted that fan reaction to the series was occasionally different depending on the gender of the reader, remarking that "it's funny how some men could sympathize with one of the worst male characters, and just hate, hate the main female character, Nancy, but there'd be women who would empathize with Nancy and understand why she did the things she did, even though they were pretty vile. We did try to treat both genders equally".

== Collected editions ==
The issues have been collected into four trade paperbacks, each collecting six issues. The volumes were released between November 2005 and May 2007, with a hardcover deluxe edition collecting all 24 issues of the series:

- Girls: The Complete Collection (hardcover, November 2007, ISBN 1-58240-826-2) collects the individual volumes:
  - Conception (collects Girls #1-6, 152 pages, November 2005, ISBN 1-58240-529-8)
  - Emergence (collects Girls #7-12, 152 pages, May 2006, ISBN 1-58240-608-1)
  - Survival (collects Girls #13-18, 152 pages, November 2006, ISBN 1-58240-703-7)
  - Extinction (collects Girls #19-24, 168 pages, May 2007, ISBN 1-58240-753-3)
