= Invisible Republic (comics) =

- Cover to Invisible Republic #1, art by Gabriel Hardman

Publication information
- Publisher: Image Comics
- Schedule: Monthly
- Genre: Science Fiction
- Publication date: March 2015
- No. of issues: 15
- Main character(s): Croger Babbs, Arthur McBride, Maia Reveron, Liv Woronov

Creative team
- Written by: Corinna Bechko and Gabriel Hardman
- Artist: Gabriel Hardman
- Colorist: Jordan Boyd

Collected editions
- Vol 1 (#1–5): ISBN 978-1632154088
- Vol 2 (#6–10): ISBN 978-1632156587
- Vol 3 (#11–15): ISBN 978-1534300637

Invisible Republic is an American science fiction comic book series created by Corinna Bechko and Gabriel Hardman and published through Image Comics. The first issue was released on March 18, 2015 to favorable reviews. The creators intended the story to run between 39 and 50 issues. The title has been on indefinite hiatus since the fifteenth issue, released in March 2017.

== Premise ==
The story is set on a distant moon colonized by humans. After the fall of a dictator who had ruled for four decades, disgraced reporter Croger Babbs begins an investigation into the secrets behind the dictator's rise. The narrative is split between Babbs' present day adventures doing his research and flashbacks showing the dictator's early days, as experienced by his cousin.

== Publication history ==
Corinna Bechko and Gabriel Hardman, who are married collaborators, began working on Invisible Republic in 2009 as a followup to their graphic novel Heathentown. They discussed the concepts and characters for years before they began writing anything. The title and some character names come from a 17th-century Irish ballad and anti-recruiting song. The project was delayed in favor of work-for-hire comics such as Deep Gravity for Dark Horse Comics and Planet of the Apes for BOOM! Studios.

The series was announced at the 2014 Image Expo, where it was described as "the epic history of the rise of an empire." The first issue was released March 18, 2015, and the series maintained a nearly-monthly schedule thereafter. Three paperback editions have been released. Each one contains five single issues. They were released in July 2015, August 2016, and April 2017. Following the release of issue 15 in March 2017, the series went on hiatus while the creators did work-for-hire projects for other comic companies. In February 2018 Bechko said they were planning its return.

In a 2015 Newsarama interview, Hardman described Invisible Republic as a big story with an ideal length of around 50 issues. In 2018, the expected length had been shortened from approximately 50 to 30 issues and Bechko mentioned a possible companion prose novel set prior to the events of the comic.

== Plot ==
After the fall of the Mallory regime on the distant moon Avalon, disgraced reporter Croger Babbs travels there hoping to find redemption by writing the truth behind the rise of the deceased dictator, Arthur McBride. Babbs has trouble finding leads until he finds a diary written by McBride's unknown cousin, Maia. As he reads her eyewitness account of McBride's ascension, other parties learn of the diary and try to steal it to prevent the violent details from McBride's rise to power from being publicly revealed. Babbs learns that Maia is still alive and receives her permission to print her diary.

== Critical reception ==
The debut issue sold nearly 23,000 copies and was ranked the 103rd best selling American comic by units in March 2015. Reviews were mostly positive with review aggregator Comic Book Roundup showing an average rating of 8.6 out of 10 based on 20 reviews. By the third issue sales had fallen to just above 8000 units for a rank of 207, a drop which is slightly larger than typically expected for new comic books. It continued to receive critical praise however, with Multiversity Comics' Jess Camacho saying the third issue "continues to be a refreshing addition to the science fiction genre." In a review for The A.V. Club, Oliver Sava complimented Boyd's use of color to provide contrast between the narrative's two temporal settings. He also described the plot as "dense" and believed Hardman's background as a storyboard artist allowed him to use creative layouts that take advantage of the medium. Overall, Sava found the themes of Invisible Republic to be chillingly plausible.

Invisible Republic was a finalist for a 2016 Hugo Award in the category Best Graphic Story.
