= Luna Brothers =

Filipino-American comics creators

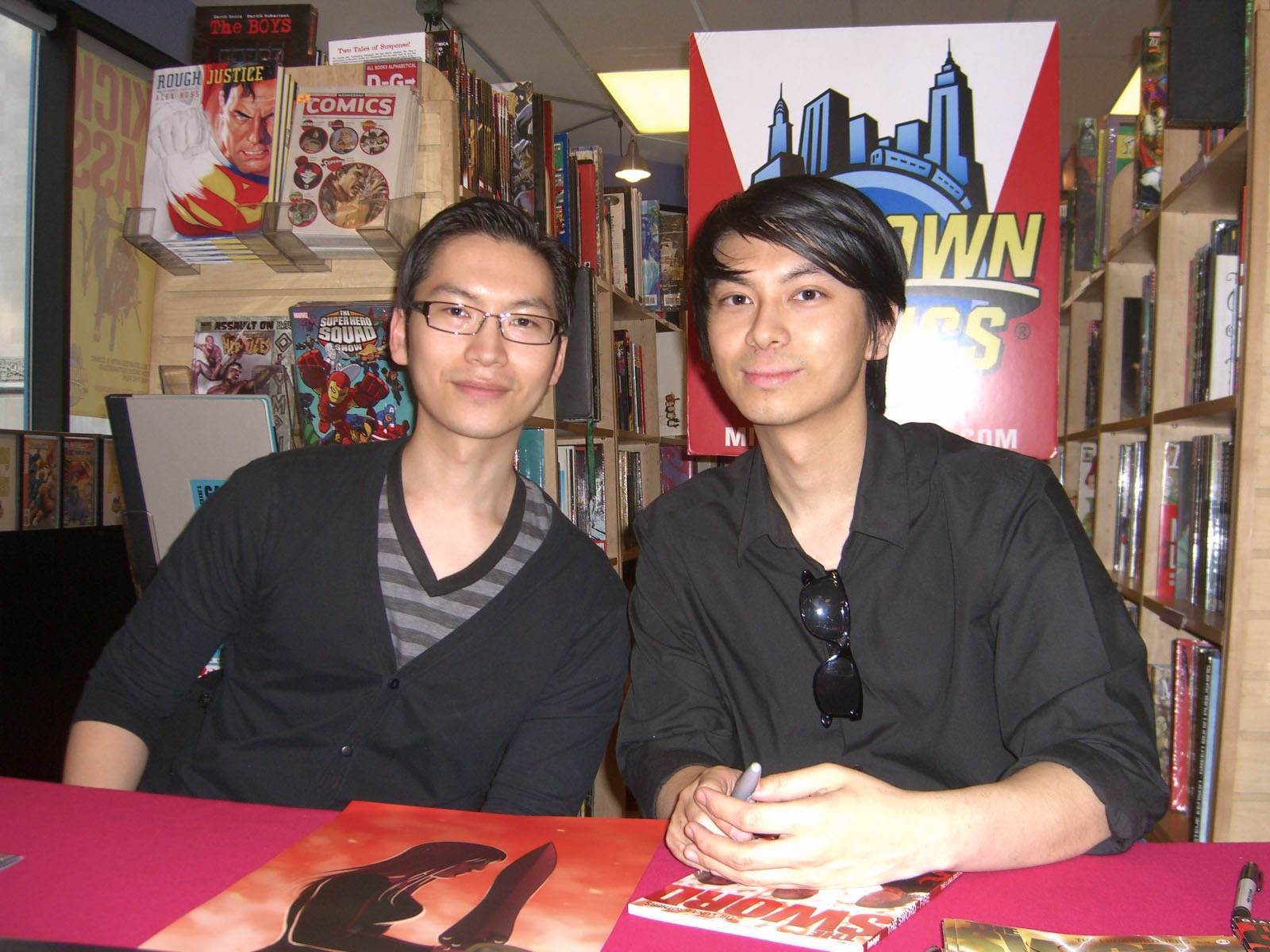
- Joshua Luna (left) and Jonathan Luna (right) at a signing at Midtown Comics Grand Central, May 13, 2010
- Born: Jonathan and Joshua Luna; December 10, 1978 (age 47) (Jonathan); January 9, 1981 (age 45) (Joshua) California
- Areas: Writer, artist
- Notable works: Ultra; Girls; The Sword

Jonathan Luna (born December 10, 1978) and Joshua Luna (born January 9, 1981), professionally known as the Luna Brothers, are Filipino-American comics creators known for their creator-owned books. They first achieved success with the series Ultra and Girls. They are also known for their book The Sword, and for providing the art for Marvel Comics' Spider-Woman: Origin.

Although early in their career they wrote and drew together, later Joshua primarily scripted the dialogue, and Jonathan did the art.

== Early lives ==
Jonathan Luna and Joshua Luna were born on December 10, 1978, and January 9, 1981, respectively, in California to Filipino parents. Their earliest interest in comics were through publications like Mad magazine, Teenage Mutant Ninja Turtles and Uncanny X-Men, and in particular, creators such as Mort Drucker, Jim Lee, Marc Silvestri, and Adam Hughes.

The Lunas spent most of their childhood overseas, living on military bases in Iceland and Italy. In their teens they were enthusiastic fans of fellow Filipino comics creator Whilce Portacio, and his creation, Wetworks. They returned to the United States in their late teens, attending Savannah College of Art and Design, where they earned Bachelor of Fine Arts degrees. Jonathan graduated in 2001, and Joshua in 2003. Their interest in the comics medium was reignited when they noticed works such as Garth Ennis's Preacher, which inspired them to work in mature genres other than superheroes, as typified by the material published by Vertigo Comics.

== Career ==
The Luna brothers sent Ultra to Image Comics publisher Erik Larsen as a blind submission, which consisted of a synopsis and five-page sequence. Image published Ultra as a miniseries between 2004 and 2005.

Girls was also published by Image between May 2005 and April 2007. In October 2007, the brothers created a limited series, again for Image, titled The Sword. Joshua Luna worked a solo miniseries, Whispers, at Image in January 2012.

Similarly, Jonathan Luna pursued his own project for Image, teaming with fellow writer Sarah Vaughn on Alex + Ada, which was released in 2013, and won a Special Prometheus Award in 2016.

The Lunas have expressed a preference for working on their own creations, but have stated that if given the opportunity, would like to work on Superman, Supergirl, Batman and Spider-Man. Joshua has also expressed an interest in one day feature film screenwriting.

== Media adaptations ==
In 2006, a pilot episode was made for a proposed Ultra television series. The pilot was produced by Barbara Hall. It featured Lena Headey as Ultra (renamed Penny Penalosa) and Peter Dinklage and was directed by Helen Shaver. While CBS and the CW expressed an interest in the series, neither decided to carry it.

In July 2013, Variety reported that Lakeshore Entertainment had acquired the film rights to The Sword in February, and was developing a film adaptation written by David Hayter.

== Technique and influences ==
Jonathan Luna has expressed an appreciation for horror works such as The Walking Dead, The Descent and I Am Legend. The Lunas have also cited TV shows such as True Blood and The Sopranos as inspirations.

Early in their career they shared both writing and art duties in their work, as seen in the first several issues of Girls, which they have described as a transition point in their collaborative process. Today, they both collaborate on plots, but Joshua primarily scripts the dialogue, and Jonathan does all the art.

When illustrating their work, Jonathan Luna uses 14 x 17 Strathmore bristol board, which he cuts into 11 x 17 pieces on which to draw. He draws using a 2H pencil, and after inking his pencils with a Micron pen, he edits his line work on a graphics tablet.

== Personal life ==
As of 2013, the Luna brothers both live in Northern Virginia.

== Bibliography ==
- Ultra: Seven Days (232 pages, Image Comics, May 2005, softcover ISBN 1-58240-483-6, hardcover, ISBN 1-58240-484-4)
- Girls: The Complete Collection (Image Comics, hardcover, November 2007, ISBN 1-58240-826-2) collects the individual volumes:
  - Conception (collects Girls #1-6, 152 pages, November 2005, ISBN 1-58240-529-8)
  - Emergence (collects Girls #7-12, 152 pages, May 2006, ISBN 1-58240-608-1)
  - Survival (collects Girls #13-18, 152 pages, November 2006, ISBN 1-58240-703-7)
  - Extinction (collects Girls #19-24, 168 pages, May 2007, ISBN 1-58240-753-3)
- Spider-Woman: Origin (with writers Brian Michael Bendis/Brian Reed, 5-issue mini-series, Marvel Comics, 2007, tpb, 120 pages, hardcover, ISBN 0-7851-1965-5, September 2006, softcover, March 2007, ISBN 0-7851-1966-3 )
- The Sword (Image Comics):
  - Fire (collects The Sword #1-6, 152 pages, April 2008, ISBN 1-58240-879-3)
  - Water (collects The Sword #7-12, 152 pages, December 2008, ISBN 1-58240-976-5)
  - Earth (collects The Sword #13-18, 152 pages, September 2009, ISBN 1-60706-073-6)
  - Air (collects The Sword #19-24, 152 pages, July 2010, ISBN 1-60706-168-6)

=== Joshua Luna ===
- Whispers (Image Comics, 6-issue mini-series, 2012 - 2013)

=== Jonathan Luna ===
- Star Bright and the Looking Glass (Image Comics, hardcover graphic novel, 2012)
- Alex + Ada (Image Comics, 2013 - 2015, with Sarah Vaughn)
- Eternal Empire (Image Comics, 2017 - 2018, with Sarah Vaughn)
- 20XX (Image Comics, 2019 - present, with Lauren Keely)
- The Knight and the Lady of Play (November 2022)
- Quest (January 2024 - present, with Crystal Wood)
- Love Spell (February 2025 - present, with Dan Stout)
