= Undying Love =

Comic book series

Publication information
- Publisher: Image Comics
- Format: Limited series
- Publication date: March – July 2011
- No. of issues: 4
- Main character(s): John Sargent & Mei

Creative team
- Created by: Tomm Coker & Daniel Freedman
- Written by: Tomm Coker & Daniel Freedman
- Artist: Tomm Coker
- Letterer: Michael David Thomas
- Colorist: Daniel Freedman

Collected editions
- Undying Love Vol.1: ISBN 978-1-60706-438-1

Undying Love is a limited comic book series created and written by Tomm Coker and Daniel Freedman. The first issue was published in March 2011 by American company Image Comics. Originally meant to be 2 arcs published as an 8-issue limited-series, only 4 issues and a collected edition were ever published.

The story is about an ex-soldier who falls in love with a vampire, a Chinese woman named Mei. To free Mei of her vampiric curse, John Sargent must fight his way through the Hong Kong underworld to kill the vampire who transformed her. It happens that Mei was transformed by one of the most powerful vampires of all times.

== Publication history ==
Coker said that he got the idea from a news story that he read about a drug-addicted woman who was forced into prostitution. One of her Johns fell in love with her, but she was ashamed of what she had become. She was also being beaten by her pimp, so the John shot and killed the pimp and some other men, was caught, and spent the rest of his life in jail.

Both creators also said they spent months researching Chinese folklore and mythology. The story is also heavily inspired by Romanian vampire lore.

== Collected edition ==
In September 2011, Undying Love Vol. 1 was released. It had 102 pages and included issues #1-4, never-before-seen art, cover gallery, character designs, a page of the script and layouts for four pages.

== Film ==
In March 2012, Alexandre Aja, director of Piranha 3D, was in negotiations to direct a film adaptation of Undying Love, but in November, Aja was out and Joe Carnahan, director of The Grey, The A-Team and Smokin' Aces, was in negotiations to direct Undying Love for Warner Bros. The project was said to be produced by Michael De Luca and Stephen L’Heureux and also by Chris Bender and J.C. Spink of Benderspink. In January 2019, David Leitch was announced to direct Undying Love from Tommy Wirkola for Studio 8 and is produced by Jeff Robinov, Kelly McCormick, and Stephen L’Heureux.
