= Pax Romana (comics) =

2012 comic book by Jonathan Hickman

- Cover art of Pax Romana #1. Art by Jonathan Hickman.

Publication information
- Publisher: Image Comics
- Schedule: Irregular
- Format: Limited series
- Genre: Science fiction
- Publication date: December 2007 – November 2008
- No. of issues: 4
- Main character(s): Nicholas Chase; Gene Pope; Constantine; Cardinal Beppi Pelle

Creative team
- Created by: Jonathan Hickman
- Written by: Jonathan Hickman
- Artist: Jonathan Hickman
- Letterer: Jonathan Hickman
- Colorist: Jonathan Hickman

Collected editions
- Pax Romana: ISBN 1-58240-873-4

Pax Romana is a creator-owned four-issue limited series comic book written and illustrated by Jonathan Hickman and published by Image Comics on March 7, 2012.

== Plot ==
Vatican-backed research has discovered the secret of time travel. With it the Church plans to fix the future by altering the past. They send a warehouse of modern weaponry and enhanced soldiers to Rome in 312 CE. Plans change quickly as the cardinal in charge of the mission is shot.

== Collected editions ==
Trade paperbacks
Title	Material collected	Publication date	ISBN
Pax Romana	Pax Romana #1–4	April 2008	ISBN 1-58240-873-4

== Adaptation ==
In April 2014, Syfy announced to adapt Pax Romana into a miniseries. Matthew Federman and Stephen Scaia (Warehouse 13) were hired as the writers of the show, with Scaia and David Alpert (The Walking Dead) as executive producers and Hickman as a co-executive producer. No new details of the project were moving forward after its initial announcement.

== Characters ==
Nicholas Chase
A retired American general who is sent with Cardinal Beppi Pelle on a mission from the Pope to change history and right the wrongs of modern humanity by ensuring that the Catholic Church reigns supreme.

Gene Pope
Pope who tells the young Holy Roman Emperor the story of how the empire has lasted for so many centuries.

Beppi Pelle
Cardinal chosen to be sent back in time to make sure the Catholic Church retains supremacy.

Constantine
Constantine was the first Christian emperor of Rome and considered within the story to be the last effective ruler of Rome.
