= The Sword (comics) =

Image Comics limited series by the Luna Brothers

- Cover to The Sword #1.

Publication information
- Publisher: Image Comics
- Schedule: Monthly
- Format: Limited series
- Publication date: October 2007 - May 2010
- No. of issues: 24
- Main character: Dara Brighton

Creative team
- Created by: Luna Brothers

Collected editions
- Fire: ISBN 1-58240-879-3
- Water: ISBN 1582409765
- Earth: ISBN 1607060736
- Air: ISBN 1607061686

The Sword is a monthly comic book limited series created by the Luna Brothers and published by American company Image Comics. The first issue was released in October 2007 and the series concluded in May 2010 with a giant-sized 24th issue.

It is a fantasy story set in modern-day about a young woman named Dara Brighton seeking revenge on a trio of siblings with unique abilities. Dara's conflict with the siblings revolves around, and is aided by, an unusual sword.

== Plot ==
Dara Brighton is a young, paraplegic, college student with a happy, normal life. One night, she and her family are attacked by three sibling strangers who claim that her father is someone they know from the past and demand from him a magical sword, displaying control and power over water, earth, and air. After they murder her family and leave Dara for dead, she finds the sword in the ruins of her home. Touching it heals her wounds and cures her paraplegia, giving her incredible powers. With her best friend, Julie, and a classmate from her school, she hunts down the three in order to get vengeance for her family.

From her classmate, she learns that her father was really an immortal warrior from ancient Minoan civilization named Demetrios, who used the sword to confront and defeat the siblings who are actually powerful demigods that were terrorizing the people of his native Crete and had killed his family. Initially, there had been four sibling demigods, but the two brothers and sister had convinced Demetrios to kill their one particularly cruel and evil brother. Demetrios then used the sword to keep the remaining siblings from dominating mankind throughout history. After successfully intimidating the siblings into hiding, Demetrios settled in North America, stopped using and hid the sword, and assumed a normal life and raised a family.

Dara, with the help of her friends, do battle with and defeat the siblings. After she kills the last one atop Mount Ida in Crete, her classmate reveals himself to be the sibling that Demetrios had killed in ancient times. He had actually survived and vowed vengeance on the siblings who betrayed him by tracking down Demetrios and planting himself in his life, posing as a student and Dara's friend and waiting for the right opportunity to strike. He commits suicide, after which Dara tosses the sword into a volcanic lava pit where it sinks down to the Earth's core, causing all of her sustained wounds to aggravate as she returns and dies in the remains of her home.

== Collected editions ==
The series is collected into trade paperbacks:

- Fire (collects The Sword #1-6, 152 pages, April 2008, ISBN 1-58240-879-3)
- Water (collects The Sword #7-12, 152 pages, December 2008, ISBN 1-58240-976-5)
- Earth (collects The Sword #13-18, 152 pages, September 2009, ISBN 1-60706-073-6)
- Air (collects The Sword #19-24, 152 pages, July 2010, ISBN 1-60706-168-6)

Additionally, there is a deluxe hardcover with all 24 issues (December 2010, ISBN 1-60706-280-1).

== Film ==
Lakeshore Entertainment are making the film version of The Sword with David Hayter writing the film's script.
