= Occult Crimes Taskforce =

American four-issue comic book mini-series

- Cover of the first issue

Publication information
- Publisher: 12 Gauge Comics / Image Comics
- Schedule: Irregular
- Format: Limited series
- Genre: Horror
- Publication date: July 2006 - May 2007
- No. of issues: 4
- Main character(s): Investigator Sophia Ortiz; Detective Aaron Cain; Detective Mucilinda; Detective Jack Faust; Detective Annis Lythe; Investigator Robert Dospil; Sergeant Jim "Grim" Mettler

Creative team
- Created by: David Atchison; Rosario Dawson; Tony Shasteen
- Written by: David Atchison; Rosario Dawson
- Artist: Tony Shasteen
- Letterer: Matt Ryan
- Colorist: Tony Shasteen
- Editor: Brian Stelfreeze

Collected editions
- Occult Crimes Taskforce: ISBN 1-58240-675-8

O.C.T.: Occult Crimes Taskforce is an American four-issue comic book miniseries about the eponymous team of fictional police officers. It was created by actress Rosario Dawson, writer David Atchison and illustrator Tony Shasteen. Dawson also lends her likeness to main character Sophia Ortiz.

== Publication history ==
The series debuted in O.C.T.: Occult Crimes Taskforce Heroes Con Preview #1, published in June 2006 by 12 Gauge Comics. O.C.T.: Occult Crimes Taskforce #1 debuted one month later after a move to 12 Gauge Comics and Image Comics.

== Background ==
The Occult Crimes Taskforce is a group of New York Police investigators who patrol a district of New York primarily populated by practitioners of magic. The "Otherground", as the denizens refer to it, is the 'Extant', the location that connects the Earth with another dimension.

=== Overview ===
There is an old and forgotten resolution in recesses of the City of New York Annotated Code of Ordinances mandating the creation of a taskforce in the Manhattan Police Department specifically designed to deal with crimes of occult origin.

The primary mission of the OCT's is to serve and protect the Manhattan populace from magical contaminations, Rogue Ceteri (creatures from the dimension beyond) and Tainted, practitioners who exploit magic for personal gain at expense of the citizenry. Contrary to general assumption, the OCT is not a large, sweeping conspiracy, but a small, elite task force of officers dealing with a problem only they can. The entire operation is no larger than 250 full-time officers, investigators and auxiliary personnel.

The OCT precinct is located near the epicenter of the Extant in an area of Manhattan informed Tainted and Ceteri refer to as the "Otherground". Due to the Otherground's proximity to the Extant's epicenter, it is a hotbed of magical activity and a haven for Ceteri and Tainted alike. Like Shangri-La, Avalon and the Garden of Eden, only Tainted individuals and Ceteri can actually see the Otherground and spells of concealment prevent the average person from viewing it.

== Fictional history ==
=== 1600s ===
In Occult Crimes Taskforce (OCT) continuity historians claim Peter Minuit purchased the Isle of Manhattan in 1626 from Wappinger Indian Tribe for 60 Dutch Guilders or $24. What the historians don't know is why the tribe sold the island for such a low price. The Wappingers had been plagued by demons, ravaged by werewolves and haunted by spirits. Their shamans cast a spell blocking passage from the alternate universe, but knew the spell was a temporary solution at best. When Minuit made his offer the Wappingers saw it as an opportunity to avenge themselves for the injustices they suffered at the hands of the early settlers.

Things remained peaceful on Manhattan for nearly two centuries, but eventually the Wappinger's barrier dissolved and conflict arose. Those closest to the extant center suffered the worst casualties. Those living farther out saw their lives minimally effected. The OCT was created shortly after the barrier breach as a means of minimizing MERlin contamination and protecting citizens. With the barrier broken and magical energies once again flowing from the extant, the area around the epicenter began to attract magical beings from across the planet.

=== 1800s ===
Formed in the 19th century, the Occult Crimes Taskforce is a covert police unit composed of the Manhattan Investigators and "Ceteri", supernatural beings from the dimension beyond, who have pledged their existence to the protection of mankind. Together, man and monster have secretly defended Manhattan for over 200 years.

== Collected editions ==
The series has been collected in a trade paperback:

- Occult Crimes Taskforce (152 pages, Image Comics, June 2007, ISBN 1-58240-675-8)

== Other media ==
=== Film ===
The Occult Crimes Taskforce film rights were acquired by Dimension Films in September 2006.

=== Television series ===
In 2012, A&E Network intended to do a TV adaptation of OCT. Jorge Zamacona was hired as the script writer, also serving as a producer along with the comic's creators Dawson, Atchison, Gilmore and Shasteen, and The Walking Dead producer Gale Anne Hurd.
