= Image Universe =

Fictional shared universe of Image Comics

- Original work: Graphic Fantasy #1 (June 1982) (Note: First appearance of Savage Dragon)
- Owner: Image Comics

Print publications
- Novels: Witchblade: Ao no Shōjo (2006); Darkchylde: The Ariel Chylde Saga (2016)
- Comics: Savage Dragon (1992–present); Spawn (1992–present); Witchblade (1995–present); The Darkness (1996–present); Aria (1999–present); Ant (2004–present); Bomb Queen (2006–present); I Hate Fairyland (2015–present); Killadelphia (2019–present); Chu (2020–present); The Scorched (2021–present); Rogue Sun (2022–present) List of ended series: The DNAgents (1983); Crossfire (1984–1988); Megaton Man (1984–1996); Pitt (1993–1999); Youngblood (1992–2018); ShadowHawk (1992–2006); Prophet (1992–2016); Trencher (1993–1994); WildStar (1993–1996); Freak Force (1993–1997); Angela (1994–2000); Supreme (1994–2015); The Pact (1994–2005); Chapel (1995–1997); Dart (1996); Darkchylde (1996–2008); Teenage Mutant Ninja Turtles (1996–1999); Sam & Twitch (1999–2004); M. Rex (1999); Jack Staff (2000–2011); Tech Jacket (2002–2015); G-Man (2002–2010); Noble Causes (2002–2008); Firebreather (2003–2009); Invincible (2003–2018); Brit (2003–2009); WildGuard (2003–2008); Capes (2003); Venture (2003–2015); Firebirds (2004); Blacklight (2005); Bloodwulf (2005); Intimidators (2005–2006); Meltdown (2006–2007); Proof (2007–2010); I Hate Gallant Girl (2008–2009); The Astounding Wolf-Man (2007–2010); Madman (2007–2010); Dynamo 5 (2007–2010); Godslayer (2007–2008); Gemini (2008–2009); Haunt (2009–2014); Chew (2009–2016); Guarding the Globe (2010–2012); The Adventures of Spawn (2007–2008); Secret Identities (2015); Outer Darkness (2018–2020)

Films and television
- Films: List of films: Spawn (1997); Witchblade (2000); Firebreather (2010); Heroes United (2011); Ready Player One (2018); Invincible (TBA)
- Television series: List of television series: The Savage Dragon (1995–96); Spawn (1997–99); Witchblade (2006); Generator Rex (2010–13); Invincible (2021–present)

Miscellaneous
- Related: Teenage Mutant Ninja Turtles; Massive-Verse; WildStorm

The Image Universe (IU) is a fictional universe in which some of the stories published by Image Comics take place. It was introduced in the early years of the publisher, shared by the various creators who formed the Image partnership. The independent, creator-owned nature of their work led to limited interaction between their characters, and little coordination of the Image Universe as a shared setting, with the primary versions populated by a number of superheroes/villains, including Supreme, Invincible, Omni-Man, Spawn, Angela, Atom Eve, the Savage Dragon, Gert, Bomb Queen, Tony Chu, and Witchblade, as well as incarnations of the Teenage Mutant Ninja Turtles.

It has mainly served as the ostensible setting of occasional crossovers between different series, including Deathmate, Image United, The Invincible War, and Crossover, all existing within a "multiverse" consisting of a multitude of different universes; in this context, "Image Universe" refers to the mainstream Image continuity.

== Publication history ==
The Image Universe began with the founding of Image Comics in 1992, launching with series such as The Savage Dragon, Spawn, Youngblood, and WildC.A.T.s.

Image Comics' nature of allowing comic creators to retain the rights to the characters they publish with Image has led to many characters entering or exiting the Image Universe as the creators move from or to other publishers. Image co-founder and Savage Dragon creator Erik Larsen generally treats the Image Universe continuity as though each title exists in its own universe, and any crossovers between different creators' characters are events that occur simultaneously in each respective characters' universes. The 1996 crossover comic Shattered Image used a variation this idea, establishing each of the major Image titles as overlapping sub-realities that shift in and out of continuity with the wider Image Universe.

When Jim Lee was an Image partner, his WildStorm properties such as WildC.A.T.s, Stormwatch, Gen^{13}, Union, Deathblow, Wetworks, and Backlash regularly crossed over with other Image characters, but when he sold his studio to DC Comics, this ceased.

In June 1996, Erik Larsen relaunched the original Teenage Mutant Ninja Turtles series by Mirage Studios with a third volume under the Image Comics banner, featuring supporting characters from other series and various crossovers with The Savage Dragon and Spawn. The series ceased publication on a cliffhanger in 1999. After its cancellation, the series remained in publication limbo for nearly two decades, with no reprints or collected volumes. In 2018, IDW Publishing, which publishes their own TMNT comic series, began to reproduce the existing 23 issues in a colored version, as well as officially conclude the Image series with a final three-issue story arc, with Carlson and Fosco again taking part in this project.

There were several Image crossover mini-series in the 1990s, such as Shattered Image, Altered Image, Big Bruisers, Badrock & Company, Deathmate, Darker Image, and Splitting Image, along with the Eclipse Comics satire Spittin' Image. But only Mars Attacks Image had any direct impact on the titles represented, as the Martians' attack was also shown and referenced many times in the Savage Dragon series.

In 2009, the Image Universe had its first major crossover in several years with Image United. However, it was canceled, with Youngblood being sold to Terrific Productions. The Pact, a crossover between Invincible, ShadowHawk, Noble Causes, and Firebreather, was also produced.

In 2021, Todd McFarlane announced the mainline Spawn series to be expanded into its own shared universe, with King Spawn, Gunslinger Spawn and The Scorched. He would also like 12 more titles for Spawn's expanded universe.

Later on in 2021, following the success of Kyle Higgins' Radiant Black, it was announced that it would expand into its own universe of books dubbed "The Massive-Verse". It all started with a one-shot crossover entitled Supermassive, written by Higgins, Ryan Parrott, and Mat Groom with art by Francesco Manna and Simone Ragazzoni. The comic served as a crossover between Radiant Black, Inferno Girl Red, and Rogue Sun, with the comic marking the first appearances of the latter two. Rogue Sun would later launch as an ongoing in March 2022 written by Parrott and drawn by Abel, while Inferno Girl Red would launch as an original graphic novel, with Groom as writer and Erica D'Urso as artist in late 2022. Radiant Black would later get a spin-off of its own with Radiant Red, a 5 issue miniseries written by Cherish Chen and art by David Lafuente. In February 2022, it was announced that another book connected to the Massive-Verse would release in August entitled The Dead Lucky, written by Melissa Flores and art by French Carlomango.

== List of universes ==
- The Bone Orchard Mythos
- Teenage Mutant Ninja Turtles (Mirage Studios)
- Chewniverse (owned by John Layman and Rob Guillory)
- Crossover
- Extreme universe
- Ghost Machine universes
  - Family Odysseys
  - Hyde Street
  - Rook: Exodus
  - The Unnamed
- Highbrow universe (owned by Erik Larsen)
- Massive-Verse
- Millarworld
- Skybound Entertainment universes
  - Energon Universe (with Hasbro)
  - Invincible
- Spawn's Universe (Todd McFarlane Productions)
- Top Cow Universe (Top Cow Productions)
- Wildstorm Universe (WildStorm, currently owned by DC Comics)
