= List of television series and films based on Image Comics publications =

This is a list of television series and films based on properties of Image Comics. This list includes live action and animated television series and films.

For some of the television series and films below, Image Comics did not begin publishing the associated comic book until after the television series or film had been released. Titles indicated in boldface below are those for which Image or its imprints had published an associated comic book before the television series or film debuted.

== Television ==
=== Live-action ===
Title	Seasons	Episodes	Original running	Production company	Network	Notes and Ref.
The Crow: Stairway to Heaven	1	22	1998–99	PolyGram Television / Alliance Communications / Alliance Atlantis Communications / Crescent Productions / Crow Productions	Broadcast syndication	
The Walking Dead	11	177	2010–2022	AMC Studios / Skybound Entertainment / Valhalla Entertainment / Circle of Confusion / Idiot Box Productions	AMC	
Powers	2	20	2015–16	Sony Pictures Television / Circle of Confusion / Jinxworld	PlayStation Network	
Fear the Walking Dead	8	113	2015–23	AMC Studios / Skybound Entertainment / Valhalla Entertainment / Circle of Confusion / Square Head Pictures	AMC	
Wynonna Earp	4	49	2016–21	Cineflix Studios / IDW Entertainment / SEVEN24 Films	Syfy / Space	
Outcast	2	20	2016–18	Fox International Studios / Skybound Entertainment / Circle of Confusion	Cinemax	
Happy!	2	18	2017–19	Universal Cable Productions / Original Film / Littletown / Hypernormal (season 2)	Syfy	
Deadly Class	1	10	2018–19	Sony Pictures Television / Universal Cable Productions / Gozie AGBO / Chipmunk Hill / Getaway Productions / Giant Generator / 2 Miles Entertainment	Syfy	
The Walking Dead: World Beyond	2	20	2020–21	AMC Studios / Skybound Entertainment / Valhalla Entertainment / Circle of Confusion / Idiot Box Productions	AMC	
Jupiter's Legacy	1	8	2021	Millarworld / Di Bonaventura Pictures / DeKnight Productions	Netflix	
Paper Girls	1	8	2022	Amazon Studios / Legendary Television / Plan B Entertainment / Future Investigation / Sorry Dave Productions / Sic Semper Tyrannis	Amazon Prime Video	
Tales of the Walking Dead	1	6	2022	AMC Studios / Skybound Entertainment / Valhalla Entertainment / Circle of Confusion / Illiterate Manifesto / Idiot Box Productions	AMC	
The Chosen One	1	6	2023	Millarworld / Redrum	Netflix	Series based on Mark Millar's American Jesus
The Walking Dead: The Ones Who Live	1	6	2024	AMC Studios / Skybound Entertainment / Valhalla Entertainment / Circle of Confusion / Hush Hush Films / Gurazoo Productions / Idiot Box Productions	AMC	
Revival	1	10	2025	Blue Ice Pictures / Hemmings Films	Syfy	
Ongoing
The Walking Dead: Dead City	3	22	2023–present	AMC Studios / Skybound Entertainment / Valhalla Entertainment / Circle of Confusion / Schneibot	AMC	
The Walking Dead: Daryl Dixon	3	19	2023–present	AMC Studios / Skybound Entertainment / Valhalla Entertainment / Circle of Confusion / Remainder Men / Idiot Box Productions	AMC	Renewed for a fourth season

=== From Image imprints ===
==== Top Cow Productions ====
Title	Seasons	Episodes	Original running	Production company	Network	Notes and Ref.
**Witchblade**	2	23	2001–02	Warner Bros. Television / Top Cow Productions / Mythic Films / Halsted Pictures (season 1) / Camelot Pictures (season 2)	TNT	
Ongoing
**The Beauty**	1	11	2026–present	Top Cow Productions / Ignition Press / Ryan Murphy Productions / 20th Television	FX / FX on Hulu	

=== Web series ===
Title	Original running	Network	Notes and Ref.
The Walking Dead: Torn Apart	2011	AMC	6 episodes.
The Walking Dead: Cold Storage	2012	AMC	4 episodes.
The Walking Dead: The Oath	2013	AMC	3 episodes.
Fear the Walking Dead: Flight 462	2015–16	AMC	16 episodes.
Fear the Walking Dead: Passage	2016–17	AMC	16 episodes.
The Walking Dead: Red Machete	2017–18	AMC	6 episodes.
Fear the Walking Dead: The Althea Tapes	2019	AMC	6 episodes.
Fear the Walking Dead: Dead in the Water	2022	AMC	6 episodes.

=== Animated series ===
Title	Seasons	Episodes	Original running	Production company	Network	Notes and Ref.
Wild C.A.T.s	1	13	1994–95	Nelvana Limited / WildStorm Productions	CBS	
The Maxx	1	13	1995	MTV Animation / Rough Draft Studios	MTV	
The Savage Dragon	2	26	1995–96	Universal Cartoon Studios / USA Studios / Lacewood Productions (season 1) / Studio B Productions (season 2) / P3 Entertainment	USA Network	
Todd McFarlane's Spawn	3	18	1997–99	HBO Animation / Todd McFarlane Entertainment	HBO	
Battle Pope	1	8	2008	World Leaders Entertainment	Spike TV	
Invincible	1	19	2008	Gain Enterprises	MTV2	
Generator Rex	3	60	2010–13	Cartoon Network Studios	Cartoon Network	
Super Dinosaur	1	26	2018–19	Spin Master Entertainment / Atomic Cartoons / Skybound Entertainment / Corus Entertainment	Teletoon	
Ongoing
Invincible	4	33	2021–present	Amazon MGM Studios / Skybound North / Skybound Animation / Point Grey Pictures / Wind Sun Sky Entertainment	Amazon Prime Video	Renewed for a fifth and sixth season.
In Development
Nights	TBA	TBA	TBA	Titmouse, Inc / Untitled Entertainment	TBA	

=== From Image imprints ===
==== Top Cow Productions ====
Title	Seasons	Episodes	Original running	Production company	Network	Notes and Ref.
**Witchblade**	1	24	2006	Gonzo	Tokyo Broadcasting System	

== Film ==
=== Live-action ===
Year	Title	Production studio(s)	Notes and Ref.
1994	The Crow	Miramax Films / Dimension Films / Entertainment Media Investment Corporation / Pressman Film / Jeff Most Productions	
1995	Tank Girl	United Artists / Trilogy Entertainment Group	
1996	The Crow: City of Angels	Miramax Films / Dimension Films / Pressman Film / Jeff Most Productions	
1997	Spawn	New Line Cinema / Todd McFarlane Entertainment	
1999	Mystery Men	Universal Pictures / Dark Horse Entertainment / Golar Productions	
2000	The Crow: Salvation	Miramax Films / Dimension Films / IMF / Pacifica Film Development / Edward R. Pressman Film Corporation / Jeff Most Productions	
2003	Bulletproof Monk	Metro-Goldwyn-Mayer / Lakeshore Entertainment / Mosaic Media Group / Lion Rock Productions	
2005	The Crow: Wicked Prayer	Dimension Films / Pressman Film / Jeff Most Productions / Fubu Films	
2010	Kick-Ass	Lionsgate / Universal Pictures / Marv Films / Plan B Entertainment	
2013	Kick-Ass 2	Universal Pictures / Dentsu / Marv Films / Plan B Entertainment	
2013	Captain Battle: Legacy War	Saint James Films / Sterling Entertainment / Tom Cat Films	
2014	The Scribbler	XLRator Media / Caliber Media Company / New Artists Alliance	
2016	Term Life	Focus World / PalmStar Entertainment / WWE Studios / Wild West Picture Show Company / Merced Media Partners	
2016	Officer Downe	Magnet Releasing	
2017	I Kill Giants	RLJE Films / 1492 Pictures / Ocean Blue Entertainment / XYZ Films / uMedia / Man of Action Studios / Parallel Films / Adonais Productions	
2019	Random Acts of Violence	Telefilm Canada / Shudder / Elevation Pictures / SND Films / Wicked Rig / Manis Films / JoBlo Productions / Kickstart Comics	
2020	The Last Days of American Crime	Netflix / Radical Studios / Mandalay Pictures	
2020	The Old Guard	Netflix / Skydance Media / Denver and Delilah Productions / Marc Evans Productions	
2024	The Crow	Lionsgate / FilmNation Entertainment / Edward R. Pressman Film Corporation / Davis Films / The Electric Shadow Company / Ashland Hill Media Finance / Hassell Free Productions / Media Capital Technologies / 30West	
2025	The Old Guard 2	Netflix / Skydance Media / Denver and Delilah Productions / Marc Evans Productions	
In development
TBA	King Spawn	Universal Pictures / Blumhouse Productions / Todd McFarlane Entertainment	Pre-production
TBA	Hardcore	Universal Pictures / Skybound Entertainment / Montauk Chair	Pre-production
TBA	Torso	Netflix / Vertigo Entertainment / Subconscious / Eat the Cat	Pre-production

==== From Image imprints ====
===== Top Cow Productions =====
Year	Title	Production studio(s)	Notes
2000	**Witchblade**	Warner Bros. Television / Turner Network Television / Top Cow Productions / Halsted Pictures	Television film
2008	**Wanted**	Universal Pictures / Relativity Media / Spyglass Entertainment / Top Cow Productions / Marc Platt Productions / Kickstart Productions /	

=== Animated films ===
Year	Title	Production studio(s)	Notes and Ref.
1995	Youngblood	Extreme Studios / Roustabout Productions	
1998	Gen^{13}	Buena Vista Pictures / Paramount Pictures / WildStorm Productions / Aegis Entertainment	
2010	Firebreather	Cartoon Network Studios / Pistor Productions	
2010	The Pro	Image Comics / YouTube	
2011	Ben 10/Generator Rex: Heroes United	Cartoon Network Studios	
2012	Dear Dracula	Kickstart Productions / Shadowline	
2022	Radiant Black vs. Blaze	Black Market Narrative / Tiger Animation	

== Reception ==
=== Box office ===
Title	Distributor(s)	Release date (United States)	Budget (in millions)	Box office gross		
Title	Distributor(s)	Release date (United States)	Budget (in millions)	Opening weekend (North America)	North America	Worldwide
The Crow	Miramax Films / Dimension Films / Entertainment Media Investment Corporation / Pressman Film / Jeff Most Productions	May 13, 1994	$23	$11,774,332	$50,693,129	$50,693,129
Tank Girl	United Artists / Trilogy Entertainment Group	March 31, 1995	$25	$2,018,183	$4,064,495	$4,064,495
The Crow: City of Angels	Miramax Films / Dimension Films / Pressman Film / Jeff Most Productions	August 30, 1996	$13	$9,785,111	$17,917,287	$25,417,287
Spawn	New Line Cinema / Todd McFarlane Entertainment	August 1, 1997	$45	$19,738,749	$54,870,174	$87,840,042
Mystery Men	Universal Pictures / Dark Horse Entertainment / Golar Productions	August 6, 1999	$68	$10,017,865	$29,762,011	$33,461,011
The Crow: Salvation	Miramax Films / Dimension Films / IMF / Pacifica Film Development / Edward R. Pressman Film Corporation / Jeff Most Productions	January 23, 2000	$10	—N/a	—N/a	—N/a
Gen^{13}	Buena Vista Pictures / Paramount Pictures / WildStorm Productions / Aegis Entertainment	October 31, 2000	$6	—N/a	—N/a	—N/a
Bulletproof Monk	Metro-Goldwyn-Mayer / Lakeshore Entertainment / Mosaic Media Group / Lion Rock Productions	April 16, 2003	$52	$8,653,542	$23,358,708	$37,713,879
Wanted	Marc Platt Productions / Kickstart Productions / Universal Pictures / Spyglass Entertainment	June 27, 2008	$75	$50,927,085	$134,508,551	$341,433,252
Kick-Ass	Lionsgate / Universal Pictures / Marv Films / Plan B Entertainment	April 16, 2010	$30	$19,828,687	$48,071,303	$96,188,903
Kick-Ass 2	Universal Pictures / Dentsu / Marv Films / Plan B Entertainment	August 16, 2013	$28	$13,332,955	$28,795,985	$60,795,985
Term Life	Focus World / PalmStar Entertainment / WWE Studios / Wild West Picture Show Company / Merced Media Partners	April 29, 2016	—N/a	$21,256	$21,256	$21,256
Officer Downe	Magnet Releasing	November 18, 2016	—N/a	$470	$850	$850
I Kill Giants	RLJE Films / 1492 Pictures / Ocean Blue Entertainment / XYZ Films / uMedia / Man of Action Studios / Parallel Films / Adonais Productions	March 23, 2018	—N/a	$120,433	$256,092	$342,558
Random Acts of Violence	Telefilm Canada / Shudder / Elevation Pictures / SND Films / Wicked Rig / Manis Films / JoBlo Productions / Kickstart Comics	September 19, 2019	$3.5	—N/a	—N/a	—N/a
The Last Days of American Crime	Netflix / Radical Studios / Mandalay Pictures	June 5, 2020	—N/a	—N/a	—N/a	—N/a
The Old Guard	Netflix / Skydance Media / Denver and Delilah Productions	July 10, 2020	$70	—N/a	—N/a	—N/a
The Crow	Lionsgate / FilmNation Entertainment / Edward R. Pressman Film Corporation / Davis Films / The Electric Shadow Company / Ashland Hill Media Finance / Hassell Free Productions / Media Capital Technologies / 30West	August 23, 2024	$50	$4,644,666	$9,275,659	$24,109,036
The Old Guard 2	Netflix / Skydance Media / Denver and Delilah Productions / Marc Evans Productions	July 2, 2025	—N/a	—N/a	—N/a	—N/a
Total			$499 million	$150,863,334	$401,595,500	$762,081,683

=== Critical and public reception ===
Film	Rotten Tomatoes	Metacritic	CinemaScore
The Crow (1994)	82% (55 reviews)	71 (14 reviews)	—N/a
Tank Girl	38% (39 reviews)	46 (23 reviews)	B
The Crow: City of Angels	12% (33 reviews)	56 (12 reviews)	—N/a
Spawn	18% (45 reviews)	34 (17 reviews)	C+
Mystery Men	60% (103 reviews)	65 (24 reviews)	C+
The Crow: Salvation	22% (9 reviews)	—N/a	—N/a
Gen^{13}	—N/a	—N/a	—N/a
Bulletproof Monk	23% (132 reviews)	40 (29 reviews)	B
The Crow: Wicked Prayer	0% (6 reviews)	—N/a	—N/a
Wanted	71% (205 reviews)	64 (38 reviews)	B+
Kick-Ass	76% (258 reviews)	66 (38 reviews)	B
Kick-Ass 2	32% (207 reviews)	41 (35 reviews)	B+
The Scribbler	50% (14 reviews)	27 (6 reviews)	—N/a
Term Life	0% (7 reviews)	23 (4 reviews)	—N/a
Officer Downe	33% (12 reviews)	26 (4 reviews)	—N/a
I Kill Giants	77% (61 reviews)	74 (10 reviews)	—N/a
Random Acts of Violence	56% (68 reviews)	39 (8 reviews)	—N/a
The Last Days of American Crime	0% (43 reviews)	15 (12 reviews)	—N/a
The Old Guard	80% (287 reviews)	70 (45 reviews)	—N/a
The Crow (2024)	21% (134 reviews)	30 (31 reviews)	B–
The Old Guard 2	27% (109 reviews)	44 (22 reviews)	—N/a
List indicator: A dark grey cell indicates information is not available for the film.

== See also ==
- Image Comics
- Image Universe
- List of Image Comics publications
- List of unproduced Image Comics projects
- Teenage Mutant Ninja Turtles
