= After the Cape =

2007 superhero comic book series

Publication information
- Publisher: Shadowline; Image Comics
- Schedule: Monthly
- Format: Limited series
- Genre: Superhero
- Publication date: (vol. 1); March – May 2007 (vol. 2); November 2007 – January 2008
- No. of issues: (vol. 1) #1–3 (vol. 2) #1–3

Creative team
- Created by: Howard Wong
- Written by: Howard Wong; Jim Valentino
- Artist(s): (vol. 1); Marco Rudy; Manny Trembley (#3) (vol. 2); Sergio Carrera
- Letterer(s): Ed Dukeshire
- Editor(s): Kristen Simon

After the Cape is a 2007 superhero comic book limited series published by the Image Comics studio ShadowLine. There is also a sequel, After the Cape II, whose first issue was published in November 2007.

Created by Howard Wong, After the Cape tells the story of a down on his luck former superhero who, following his retirement as a superhero, has fallen into depression and succumbed to alcoholism. He must make ground breaking decisions about both his superhero career and his duty as both a husband and father.

== Plot ==
=== After the Cape ===
It started out as Ethan woke up in bed and got his kids ready for school. After his wife came home from a long night at work, Ethan told her about him getting a promotion at work. The next day, it showed Ethan going to wait for some guys and decided to go to the bar to get just one drink which ended up being a long series of drinks.

He flashed back to when he was Captain G, a gravity based superhero who had to face an intervention by his fellow superheroes. His team confronted him about his alcoholism endangering innocent lives and even their own lives. After some arguing, Ethan left the team.

It was revealed that he had been robbing banks with a couple of other thugs, using his power to immobilize the patrons of the bank. After his 'last job', he got called by Yip Loch, who knows about his powers and offered him a chance for more money. He also subtlety threatened his family. So, Ethan decided to do the job.

Meanwhile, Ethan's ex-teammates discovered that Ethan had been robbing banks to get money and decided to stop him.

Shadow Stalker told Ellie, Ethan's wife about what happened. He told her that he and his teammates will stop Ethan.

Ethan and a group of mob men attacked at Russian ship. After Ethan started drinking again at the ship where the mob men were looting the place, the superheroes attacked. Ethan got so drunk that he was not sure he could fly and he and Shadow Stalker fought.

Ethan ended up badly injuring Shadow Stalker and escaped to look for his wife and kids only to find the house empty with a Dear John letter. He was left alone.

=== After the Cape II ===
Ethan, trying to get back together with Ellen, meets her at a restaurant, but she is disgusted that he is drunk, and then gunmen attack.
