= Rebound (character) =

Publication information
- Publisher: Image Comics under ShadowLine
- First appearance: Jim Valentino's ShadowHawk #7 (November, 2005)
- Created by: Jim Valentino

In-story information
- Alter ego: Jen Lyter
- Abilities: Deflect anything thrown at her

Rebound is a fictional comic book character created by Jim Valentino. She first appeared in Jim Valentino's ShadowHawk #7 (November, 2005) where ShadowHawk meets a mysterious red haired girl who has the power to deflect anything thrown at her.

== Early life ==
Born in New Port City's surburbia east side to a crack head father who died in prison after being gang raped. Her mother started turning tricks to support her. Later her mother met a man named John who had money, political influence in New Port City and started to support her and mother. But it has its price, as her mother was willing to turn a blind eye to statutory rape which began happening to her starting at ten years old.

== ShadowHawk ==
ShadowHawk met Rebound, who has the power to deflect anything thrown at her. Later on ShadowHawk sees Rebound at school. ShadowHawk will go face-to-face with Rebound who may change his life forever. As ShadowHawk learns more about her, after Eddie Collins learns Rebound's real name, Jen Lyter, the two make love.
