= Blacklight (Image Comics) =

- Blacklight #1 (2005) - cover artist(s): Marc Deering and Jon Toledo

Publication information
- Publisher: Image Comics under ShadowLine
- First appearance: (Ted Cleaver) Jim Valentino's ShadowHawk #1 (Lina Juarez) Blacklight #1 (June 2005)
- Created by: (Ted Cleaver) Jim Keplinger; Carlos Rodriguez (Lina Juarez) Scott Wherle; John Toledo

In-story information
- Alter ego: Ted "Eddie" Cleaver; Lina Juarez
- Team affiliations: The Pact
- Abilities: Dark Matter

Blacklight is the name of two fictional characters associated with the vigilante ShadowHawk from Image Comics.

== Ted Cleaver ==
Blacklight, a 1960s "hippie hero", awakes out of a 30-year coma and goes looking for his wife Dayglo, who was actually killed by "Firepower" ten years ago. He is lied to by a man in the shadows, and thinking ShadowHawk is the son of Firepower, he starts a fight with Shadowhawk, but Shadowhawk sees Blacklight's weakness and kills him.

== Lina Juarez ==
Blacklight is dead, but the "Dark Matter" that gave him his powers has found a home inside an innocent bystander, Lina Juarez, giving her the power to change her life as the new Blacklight. Shadowhawk meets her, looking for a mysterious "corpse" who is killing people. Blacklight is looking for the origin of her newfound powers. The two team up to bring the vicious monster down: the first Blacklight, the man Eddie (Shadowhawk) killed.

Later, Blacklight goes to see Shadowhawk, thanking him for her namesake's merciful death, and helps Eddie Collins stop Luke Hatfield Jr., also known as Hawk's Shadow. After Bomb Queen, in disguise, travels to Las Vegas in search of a weapon prototype at a gun convention, she runs into Blacklight, while also visiting Las Vegas for a comic convention.

Later, Blacklight and Shadowhawk's girlfriend Rebound face off New Port City's Bomb Queen.
