= Orange Iguana =

Orange iguana may refer to

- Orange Iguana, an alias used by the main character in the Firebreather comic book
- Orange Iguanas, a band which has appeared on the television show Chic-a-Go-Go
- Orange Iguanas, team designation within the Legends of the Hidden Temple children's game show
