= Image United =

Comic book series

- Variant cover of Image United 1 (Nov. 2009), art by Whilce Portacio featuring the character he created for this series, Fortress.

Publication information
- Publisher: Image Comics
- Schedule: Monthly
- Format: Limited series
- Genre: Superhero
- Publication date: November 2009
- No. of issues: 4 (#1–3 plus #0)
- Main character(s): Youngblood; Shadowhawk; Spawn; Savage Dragon; Invincible; Witchblade; Cyberforce; Fortress

Creative team
- Written by: Robert Kirkman
- Artist(s): Whilce Portacio; Jim Valentino; Marc Silvestri; Rob Liefeld; Erik Larsen; Todd McFarlane

Image United is an incomplete comic book limited series published by Image Comics. The intent of the series was to re-unite the founders of Image Comics on a joint project, serving as a crossover among various Image Universe titles. However, there were delays in production, and only three of the planned six issues were published in November 2009 (plus a spinoff, the prologue-centric #0), with artist Rob Liefeld eventually confirming that no further issues would be forthcoming.

== Background ==
Image was announced in 1992 as a cooperative publisher with seven partners – Erik Larsen, Jim Lee, Rob Liefeld, Todd McFarlane, Whilce Portacio, Marc Silvestri, and Jim Valentino – who each created and controlled their own superhero characters. Portacio dropped out before the partnership was formed, Liefeld left the partnership later, and Lee sold his characters and took a position at DC Comics. Although the various creators' characters had occasionally appeared in each other's books, it was rare for them to appear together. Image United was a long-discussed effort to feature them all in a single story.

The plan was to feature Youngblood, Spawn, Savage Dragon, Shadowhawk, Witchblade, Cyberforce, Invincible, and the Darkness, with each creator drawing his own characters. Portacio, whose series Wetworks had been sold to DC with Lee's characters, created a new stand-in character for the series: Baxter Montgomery, code-named Fortress. Lee would participate by contributing covers. Robert Kirkman, who had recently joined Image as a partner, would write the story.

== Plot ==
The story begins with Fortress appearing unsure of his new powers and still adjusting to them. This leads to a run-in with Savage Dragon, who assumes the worst about Fortress, and Fortress accidentally knocks Dragon to the ground. Before the altercation can continue, they both run into Doc Seismic, and a fight ensues, resulting in Fortress finally taking down Seismic after absorbing all his energy. Dragon then thanks Fortress for his help, but after trying to bring him in, Fortress flies off unable to handle the amount of energy he absorbed. He then crashes down onto the ground and passes out after having a vision of all the Image Comics characters standing together.

Issue #1 begins with Fortress continuing to have his vision of the Image Universe characters. In said vision, they face an evil they cannot possibly stand against and are all systematically taken down. Fortress snaps out of it to find himself on a roof in Chicago, before he can get his bearings, he sees Overt-Kill down in the street causing mass destruction while Youngblood arrive on the scene to face down Overt-Kill. Dragon sees the commotion and joins the fray, teaming with Youngblood to stop Overt-Kill.

Meanwhile, at Cyberforce HQ, Cyberforce are seeing violent incidents rising all over the country. Unsure of where to assist first, they conclude that all these incidents arising at the same time can be no coincidence and there must be a larger force at work. At that point Velocity runs in and informs them of big mess in downtown New York City, and they decide to go there first.

Back in Chicago, Dragon and Youngblood are still fighting against Overt-Kill and not having much success. Fortress, tired of standing by, joins the fray, just in time for Diehard's current body to be destroyed by Overt-Kill. He uploads himself into a new body, and as he departs Youngblood HQ, Troll informs him that a new recruit is waiting before he runs out. Fortress, Shaft, Badrock and Dragon continue to engage Overt-Kill in Chicago.

At Youngblood HQ, Eddie Collins, Shadowhawk, is waiting to audition for the team with his father. Troll runs in and informs him that Shaft is out in the field, and that he will be handling the final evaluation. Eddie suits up and says that he is ready.

Back in Chicago, Badrock gets the upper hand on Overt-Kill and destroys his body. Overt-Kill launches his head off, but Shaft grounds him before he can escape. Fortress sees the battle is over, but cannot help but feel that worse things are coming and he must gather more forces. Diehard returns and takes Vogue to a hospital to be treated for her wounds. Dragon starts to leave but Fortress stops him by slamming him into a wall and starts screaming that the world needs them and terrible danger is coming. Dragon punches him down unsure of what Fortress is talking about, Shaft steps in and says that Youngblood will take him into custody.

Back at Youngblood HQ, Shadowhawk has apparently passed all evaluations with flying colors and Troll tells him that he's as good as in. Cougar runs by and tells Troll that Girth, Quantum and Crypt are all active in different locations and that Youngblood is splitting into three teams to assist. Troll tells Shadowhawk that while he must stay to coordinate the effort, they could use Shadowhawk in the field. Shadowhawk agrees with almost no hesitation.

In New York City, Jim Downing is sitting in a room when a voice tells him to rise, and that he is a piece of a plan that has already been set into motion. Jim is unsure of who it is and transforms into Spawn, demanding to know who it is and what they want. Al Simmons then reveals himself as the Omega Spawn, and says that he wants it all, and that Jim Downing is going to help him get it.

Back in Chicago, Dragon arrives back home to find Malcolm watching TV and Angel attempting to help with the chaos. Dragon forbids her before he is called in by the Police Department. His only comment being, "What in the world is going on...?"

At Youngblood HQ, Shaft goes to visit Fortress in his cell, once there Shaft demands to know what he was going on about to Dragon earlier. Fortress says he only knows bits, but that it's going to get worse, and if they do not gather everyone against the coming threat, they will all die.

In New York, Jim Downing comes face to face with Al Simmons, where Al Simmons makes all his plans clear to end the world, and he asks Jim to help him. Jim refuses and engages Omega Spawn in a battle, where Al easily gains the upper hand. Omega Spawn makes it very clear that he is superior, and informs Jim that he will never truly know what he was a part of, and he will never have the answers his sought, as he attempts to deliver a final blow Jim teleports himself to a hospital. He attempts to warn them of the coming threat, but is too weak. He is taken into care by Ann Stevens.

Coincidentally enough, this is also the hospital Diehard brought Vogue to after their fight with Overt-Kill. Vogue appears to be sleeping or passed out, and as Diehard attempts to tell her how he feels about her, the hospital is attacked. Diehard rushes to get Vogue to safety, as Ann changes into Mighty Man to assist against the attack.

Shaft continues to speak with Fortress, with Fortress explaining everything, only for Shaft to doubt his story. Shaft rushes off to assist in the fights as Fortress yells that they need all the help they can get.

In New York, Sara Pezzini sees Youngblood and Shadowhawk engaged in a fight with more villains, and rushes in to assist with the Witchblade.

In Chicago, SuperPatriot is attempting to fight off even more villains as Dragon enters the fray. After defeating them, they are called in to assist at the hospital where Mighty Man and Diehard are still engaged in battle. Dragon and SuperPatriot enter the fray to assist, but are interrupted by the timely intervention of Spawn who dispatches the villains with ease as the other heroes assist in evacuating the Hospital.

Over in Hartford, Cyberforce is still engaged in battle, which is ended due to the intervention of apparently newcomer, Barricade, who apparently also got his powers from Cyberdata. Cyberforce decides to keep Barricade with them, and check in with Youngblood to see if they have a better understanding of what is going on.

Flashes are shown of Seattle, Huntington, St. Louis. Orlando, Detroit and Los Angeles, showing The Darkness amongst others engaged in battle with multiple villains who all appear to be getting the upper hand.

In Chicago, Spawn is explaining the situation to Diehard and Dragon, and reveals Al Simmons, the Omega Spawn as the villain to them. At that moment, Youngblood arrives to pick up Diehard, who takes Dragon and Spawn with him for any help and information they can provide.

Back at Youngblood HQ, Fortress continually tells himself that it's too late. The New York Youngblood team has defeated their villains and Shadowhawk is telling his dad that is fine. Shaft and his father are at the HQ, and await their return.

In New York, a massive group of villains has assembled, poised to destroy New York City, under the orders of the Omega Spawn. They run towards the Statue of Liberty in a group attack.

== Reception ==
The first issue selling just over 42,000 copies, and the second selling around 27,500. Both issues sold out, warranting additional printings. Despite the good sales, the series thus far has received poor reviews. Comic Book Resources awarded the first issue two stars out of five, another review from the website gave it one-and-a-half stars out of five. IGN gave similar reviews, awarding issue #1 a "Mediocre" score of 5.8 out of 10 and issue #2 a "Bad" score of 4.3 out of 10.

== Delays ==
Additional criticism fell upon the delays between the second and third issues. Rob Liefeld commented on his Twitter, saying, "It goes without saying that Image United is a massive embarrassment. Damn shame the enthusiasm for the book not shared by all."

Said delays have also caused multiple spin off books to be produced. First was Image United #0, also written by Robert Kirkman, featuring the same jam style art contributions from Erik Larsen and Whilce Portacio, drawing Savage Dragon and Fortress respectively, and additional art by Image mainstay Ryan Ottley, handling art chores for Doc Seismic. It was initially released as a four-part back-up ran in Savage Dragon, Invincible, Witchblade, and Spawn. It was meant to act as a prelude to the series and was collected in a single issue (with a bonus parody story, Image United by G-Man creator Chris Giarrusso) in February.

The second book was to be called Image United Interlude, also written by Kirkman, featuring art by Ryan Ottley. Solicitations for the book focused on the effects of the story on other characters within the Image Universe, including Invincible. It was meant to follow the "cataclysmic events" of Image United #3.

Image United #4 and #5 were solicited for an April and May 2010 release and another fill-in issue titled Image United: Interlude was solicited for March 31, 2010. That interlude would feature other heroes from the Image Universe such as Invincible but was not published. In December 2010, Kirkman stated in a video interview that Image United was definitely going to finish the book. In January 2011, Erik Larsen stated, "Image United #4 is about 60% done. The thing is, there are pages that are completely done and sitting there finished and there are others out there that need one guy to come in and do his character then it's done. There's a few pages where more work is needed and three or four guys all need to be jamming and not everybody showed up. It's kind of a mish-mash in terms of that." As the "de facto middleman and editor" of the book, Larsen explained that other commitments prevented the creators involved from finishing their work on time, but stated that McFarlane took responsibility for the nine-month delay between the second and third issues. In March 2011, Erik Larsen commented that issue #4 was 'about 60% done,' and that he was laying out issue #5. By 2014, Larson described the project as "dead" and said that there was nothing he could do to advance it.

By early 2019, Rob Liefeld said he was still determined to finish the Image United series. However he later confirmed that the series is unfinished as it is officially 'dead'

== Sources ==
Interviews

- Wigler, Josh (July 24, 2009). "CCI: Kirkman and McFarlane on "Image United"". Comic Book Resources. Archived from the original on July 27, 2009.
- Rogers, Vaneta (October 21, 2009). ""Image United" Weekly – Erik Larsen". Newsarama. Archived from the original on October 24, 2009.
- Geddes, John (October 29, 2009). "Comic all-stars team up for Image United". USA Today.
- Rogers, Vaneta (October 30, 2009). "IMAGE UNITED Weekly – Jim Valentino". Newsarama. Archived from the original on November 3, 2009.
- Geddes, John (November 3, 2009). "Robert Kirkman talks Image United". USA Today.
- Rogers, Vaneta (November 4, 2009). "IMAGE UNITED Weekly – Rob Liefeld". Newsarama.
- Geddes, John (November 10, 2009). "Jim Valentino on Image United and ShadowHawk". USA Today.
- Rogers, Vaneta (November 11, 2009). "IMAGE UNITED Weekly – Whilce Portacio". Newsarama. Archived from the original on November 15, 2009.
- Geddes, John (November 12, 2009). "Marc Silvestri discusses Image United and big 2010". USA Today.
- Kirkman, Robert (November 16, 2009). "Kirkman Talks Image United". Techland.com.
- Rogers, Vaneta (November 20, 2009). "IMAGE UNITED Weekly – Marc Silvestri". Newsarama. Archived from the original on November 24, 2009.
