= The Pact (comics) =

Image Comics limited series

- First issue of the second series.

Publication information
- Publisher: Image Comics
- Format: Limited series
- Publication date: (vol 1) February 1994 (vol 2) March 2005
- No. of issues: (vol. 1): 3 (vol. 2): 4
- Main character(s): Firebreather; Shadowhawk; Invincible; Zephyr; Quantum Girl; Handgunn; Blacklight; Slam; Cutlass

Creative team
- Created by: Jim Valentino; Len Senecal

The Pact is a superhero team in American comic books published by Image Comics. The Pact was a comic book title released in two limited series by Image Comics.

== Vol. 1 ==
The members were Handgunn, Blacklight, Slam and Cutlass. The mini-series was three issues.

=== Synopsis ===
Handgunn, Blacklight, Slam and Cutlass start a new superhero team in Los Angeles, California.

== Vol. 2 ==
Volume 2 of the Pact centers on Firebreather, ShadowHawk, Invincible and Zephyr forming a loose-knit association with one another as opposed to being an actual super-team.

=== Synopsis ===
- Issue one named Father's Day, The Pact starts with Firebreather, Shadowhawk, Invincible, and Zephyr, come together to fight Firebreather's father, who was going to see his son on Father's Day. After Shadowhawk thinks of forming an informal group and hang out with no parents or nothing and talk about super-stuff. Zephyr said her family's got a place on the Moon they can use.
- Issue two named To the Moon, Invincible meets Firebreather, Shadowhawk, and Zephyr with pizza on the Moon. As the four start to eat, a fireball is seen headed straight for earth. Invincible goes out-side in hopes of stopping it. The fireball is made up of little "space monsters". Some make it to the moon and fight Shadowhawk and Zephyr, as Invincible and Firebreather fight monsters on earth.
- Issue three named The Life of Quantum Girl, Quantum Girl was a founding member of The Pact. She has precognitive visions, the ability to teleport, and the ability to generate force fields. She was in one issue of The Pact and her history and powers are currently a mystery.
- Issue four, Firebreather asks Shadowhawk, Invincible, and Zephyr go help him look for Lava Monsters. Invincible meets James Collins (Shadowhawk's father). In a fight, Zephyr thinks Shadowhawk is nuts after learning about the Nommo. The team meets Doc Seismic who had met Invincible in the hero's titular series. The villain is swiftly defeated. Later, Zephyr begins a flirtation with Shadowhawk simply to annoy her mother.
