= Bomb Queen =

American fictional comic book character

- Cover Bomb Queen: Gang Bang, featuring Bomb Queen along with a group of her recurring superhero adversaries. Clockwise starting upper far left: Tempest, Bomb Queen, Blacklight, Fetish, and Rebound. Art by Jimmie Robinson.

Publication information
- Publisher: Image Comics
- First appearance: Bomb Queen #1, February 2006
- Created by: Jimmie Robinson

In-story information
- Abilities: Master strategist and tactician; Expertise in explosive devices; Augmented computerized assistance; Gymnastic skills; Fighting skills; Altered DNA grant her energetic projection in form of "Energy bombs"

Bomb Queen, also known as The Queen, is a fictional character created by Jimmie Robinson. She first appeared in Image Comics' Bomb Queen Vol. 1, #1, and has subsequently appeared in eight limited series, four single-issue specials, and a crossover in The Savage Dragon #134.

Bomb Queen is a villainess who has eliminated and subsequently banned all superheroes from the fictional city of New Port City. She rules the city as a dictator; the limitations she has placed over the city's criminals have made her a popular leader.

== Fictional character biography ==
Bomb Queen was originally part of a quartet of supervillains called The Four Queens, who reigned over New Port City. When all the superheroes in town were finally defeated or slain, the Queens turned on Bomb Queen. Bomb Queen emerged as the victor, and took control over the local government, without any superpowers of any kind, armed only with bombs and athletic ability.

Bomb Queen founded New Port City's "No Heroes" law (which outlaws superheroes); this lawmade the town a magnet for criminals across America. This pleased politicians in Washington, D.C., due to the lowered crime rates in other states. However, the government was not happy with the self-elected leadership of Bomb Queen and formed a corrupt organization called the Shadow Government to make numerous attempts to eliminate Bomb Queen. Various smear campaigns have failed to dent her immense public popularity, the government turned to other options. In the third volume, Bomb Queen is revealed to be a clone created by the Shadow Government to serve as the prison warden of New Port City, in order to contain its innate evil (her pet cat Ashe), acquiring superpowers for herself after merging with her younger clone Bomb Teen.

Bomb Queen's rule over the city (and her cavalier attitude to crime) caused the city to flourish. The city coffers were overflowing with laundered money, which caused New Port City to rival Las Vegas. This also resulted in private local TV stations, Intranet, and regional cable stations being allowed to air unrated content – often of Bomb Queen herself, in pornographic movies filmed from her fortified townhouse.

The restriction of the city limits kept Bomb Queen confined in her city of crime, but also presented extreme danger if she were to ever leave - where the law is ready and waiting. This was illustrated in the one-shot comic, Bomb Queen vs. Blacklight (Aug. 2006). Bomb Queen, in disguise, traveled to Las Vegas in search of a weapon prototype at a gun convention and encountered the superheroine Blacklight.

== Ashe ==
Bomb Queen is never seen without her black cat, Ashe. The animal has mysterious origins and is connected to the Maya of Central America. The cat's powers have saved the day in numerous situations, such as the finale of the Bomb Queen vs. Blacklight oneshot. Later on, Ashe is murdered, but in reality, Ashe is the physical manifestation of a demon whose realm nexus is New Port City, and can manipulate the rage of its citizens, notably Bomb Queen.

== Publication history ==
Under Image Comics' ShadowLine banner, Bomb Queen has been printed as eight mini-series and four one-shots. These are denoted by Roman numerals and subtitles instead of the more traditional sequential order.

1. Bomb Queen: WMD: Woman of Mass Destruction
2. Bomb Queen 2: Dirty Bomb: The Queen of Hearts
3. Bomb Queen 3: Bombshell: The Good, The Bad & The Lovely
4. Bomb Queen 4: Suicide Bomber
5. Bomb Queen 5: Bombastic: The Divine Comedy
6. Bomb Queen 6: Time Bomb: Countdown to Armageddon
7. Bomb Queen 7: End of Hope: The Day the Heroes Died
8. Bomb Queen 8: Ultimate Bomb: Trump Card

Bomb Queen made an appearance in #134 of The Savage Dragon, while Invincible and the Savage Dragon appeared in Suicide Bomber.

In 2013, Bluewater Productions published Crossed Wires, a four-issue miniseries that saw 10th Muse cross over with various independent comic book characters including Bomb Queen, Badger, Demonslayer, and Judo Girl.

=== Miniseries ===
Title	Publishing dates	Collections	Description
Bomb Queen: Royal Flush	February-May 2006	Bomb Queen: WMD: Woman of Mass Destruction (with 40 extra pages of material) (Trade Paper Back) - July 2006; Bomb Queen Deluxe Edition Volume 1 (Hardcover Edition) - April 2013	Bomb Queen is put on the defensive when a scheming politician introduces a superhero into the community to win back the people's favour. When the hero's efforts prove fruitless, the politician unleashes a chemically created monster who threatens not only Bomb Queen but the city itself.
Bomb Queen II: Queen of Hearts	October-December 2006	Bomb Queen II: Dirty Bomb (Trade Paper Back) - July 2007; Bomb Queen Deluxe Edition Volume 1 (Hardcover Edition) - April 2013	Bomb Queen, hard-up for romance, falls head-over-heels for an enigmatic stranger who may prove to be her undoing. The stranger is later revealed to be Ice Queen, who was brutally disfigured by Bomb Queen and was taken in by the government for use as a bio-weapon. However, The Agency did not want a woman and Ice Queen was forced into sexual reassignment surgery, crippling her cryokinetic powers as a result. Ice Queen eventually usurps Bomb Queen's rule over New Port and becomes the Bomb King. In the end, Bomb King is defeated by Bomb Queen after having the mutated powers he possessed as a woman being literally injected into his eyes, causing his body to freeze over. To add insult to injury, Bomb Queen later goes on to make him into a statue as punishment for his coup d'état.
Bomb Queen III: The Good, The Bad and The Lovely	March-June 2007	Bomb Queen III: The Good, The Bad and The Lovely (Trade Paper Back) - February 2007; Bomb Queen Deluxe Edition Volume 2 (Hardcover Edition) - May 2013	Bomb Queen faces Blacklight, and Rebound. The Agency unleashes Bomb Teen against the Queen, who has a healing factor and the ability to create energy bombs. After her victory, the Teen reveals that Bomb Queen is a clone, and was created to lead New Port City as a trial free zone for villains to be deported. The Teen dies, but is absorbed by the Queen, giving her the Teen's powers.
Bomb Queen IV: Suicide Bomber	August-December 2007	Bomb Queen IV: Suicide Bomber (Trade Paper Back) - May 2008; Bomb Queen Deluxe Edition Volume 2 (Hardcover Edition) - May 2013	After the death of Ashe and gaining of new abilities, Bomb Queen declares war against the Image Universe. She initially makes herself more popular with the people of New Port City, and later goes on to fire WMDs at the cities of New York, Chicago, Tower city, and Baltimore. Shadowhawk, Savage Dragon, Dynamo 5, Invincible all help to look for survivors. She eventually tells the United States Government that New Port City is now an autonomous state in the union, leaving the government forty eight hours to answer. Ashe is revealed to be a demon, and New Port City his sphere of influence. A female Hellspawn challenges Bomb Queen, successfully killing her and sending her to Ashe's realm. However, Bomb Queen conquers Ashe's realm and returns, now armed with supernatural powers. She also cuts off Ashe's ability to manipulate rage, rerouting the energy to herself.
Bomb Queen V: The Divine Comedy	May 2008-March 2009	Bomb Queen V: Bombastic (Trade Paper Back) - April 2009; Bomb Queen Deluxe Edition Volume 3 (Hardcover Edition) - October 2013	The Story So Far: With New Port City's growing popularity—and population—Bomb Queen's control of her harmful hamlet is slipping. Meanwhile, the writers of capewatch.com--a blog covering hero & villain activity—want the inside scoop on the Queen, and are willing to infiltrate NPC's borders to do it. Their plan: go to Littleville—America's "safest city" (thus the antithesis of NPC) and NPC's main supply source—and sneak in via one of the delivery vehicles. But Littleville has its own plans; a serial killer has infiltrated the good town, hoping to commit enough murder to warrant admission to NPC, and the town itself has decided to send THEIR superhero, the White Knight, in to try to control the Queen. It is later revealed that the White Knight is in fact Bomb Queen's twin brother who possessed two personalities: A serial killer who attacked Littleville and an anti-hero parody of himself called Black Knight.
Bomb Queen VI: Oh-BOMB-Ah!	September 2009-February 2011	Bomb Queen VI: Time Bomb (Trade Paper Back) - June 2011; Bomb Queen Deluxe Edition Volume 3 (Hardcover Edition) - October 2013	President Obama has promised change to America and one of the things he's set his sights on is the lawless New Port City and it's villainous dictator, Bomb Queen! But our favorite super villain is ready to show the world the TRUE meaning of absolute evil! Don't miss the world-altering Bomb Queen vs. Obama where nobody is safe!
Bomb Queen VII: The End of Hope	December 2011-May 2012	Bomb Queen VII: The End of Hope (Trade Paper Back) - August 2012; Bomb Queen Deluxe Edition Volume 4 (Hardcover Edition) - November 2013	Bomb Queen rises to wreak havoc in a techno-dependent future after being killed by Rebound 100 years prior to Bomb Queen VII, but this utopia is protected by the ultimate hero: Shadowhawk! Will the evil Queen rule the world in this sci-fi thriller or will the hero save humanity from destruction? Join Jimmie Robinson as he breaks the mold in this unpredictable saga.
Bomb Queen VIII: Trump Card	August-December 2020	Bomb Queen VIII: Trump Card (Trade Paper Back) - January 2021	Bomb Queen, the ultimate super villain, runs for president in the 2024 election to stop Trump from winning a third term, which is rigged to make him president for life. This bizarre, over-the-top election serves up a dark satire on society, media, and politics.

=== Oneshots ===
Title	Authors	Description
Bomb Queen vs. Blacklight: Cat Fight	Written by Scott Wherle, art & cover by Jimmie Robinson, colors by Jason Embury	Bomb Queen, in disguise, travels to Las Vegas in search of a weapon prototype at a gun convention and runs into Blacklight, also visiting Las Vegas for a comic convention. Continuity-wise, this story falls in between the first two mini-series.
Bomb Queen Presents: All-Girl Comics #1	Written by Kris Simon & Kat Cahill, art by Seth Damoose, cover by Jimmie Robinson, and colors by Frank Bravo	Bomb Queen reluctantly teams up with Blacklight, Editor Girl, Tempest (from I Hate Gallant Girl), Rebound and Fetish when a strange epidemic renders the world's male populace impotent.
Bomb Queen Versus Hack/Slash Valentines Day Special	Jimmie Robinson	The demon dog, Pooch, leads Hack/Slash's Cassie and Vlad to the dimension of superheroes where they hunt Bomb Queen's cat, Ashe. Her demon cat has split a dimension between realities, allowing the Queen's twisted and perverted slashers into Cassie's world—along with, worst of all, Bomb Queen herself!
Bomb Queen Presents: All-Girl Special	Jimmie Robinson, colors by Paul Little	There can only be one Queen! Following the explosive events against President Obama in BOMB QUEEN, VOL. 6, Bomb Queen continues her war against the world when she travels to London to kill the Queen of the United Kingdom. But Madame Queen has a few super heroine tricks up her sleeve, too...

The oneshot specials are collected in Bomb Queen: Gang Bang (Trade Paper Back) and Bomb Queen Deluxe Edition Volume 4 (Hardcover Edition).

== Reception ==
IGN gave the second issue a rating of three out of five and WMD tradeback a rating of four out of five.
