= Intimidators (comics) =

The Intimidators is an Image Comics mini-series written by Neil Kleid and illustrated by Miguel Montenegro. The series was created and co-plotted by Jim Valentino.

== Overview ==
The series is about the Intimidators and Astroman. A silver age battle in Cold War Cuba knocks Astroman, a goody-two-shoes sixties superhero, forty-three years into the future where he decides to try to turn the Intimidators into a group of heroes. Prior to Astroman's arrival, the Intimidators were America's Domestic Strike Unit, but were seldom sent into action because of their callous attitude and bloody disregard for human life. Aside from Astroman the team features Crash, Byrn, Limit, Fetish and Firepower.

== Publication history ==
- Intimidators #1 (December 2005)
- Intimidators #2 (January 2006)
- Intimidators #3 (February 2006)
- Intimidators #4 (March 2006)
