= Normalman =

normalman
- Cover to the Complete normalman trade paperback, with Captain Everything carrying normalman by Jim Valentino.

Publication information
- Publisher: Aardvark-Vanaheim; Renegade Press; Slave Labor Graphics; Image Comics
- First appearance: Cerebus #56 (Nov. 1983)
- Created by: Jim Valentino

In-story information
- Alter ego: Norm-L
- Place of origin: Arnold
- Partnerships: Captain Everything; Sgt. Fluffy; Sophisticated Lady
- Abilities: none
normalman
Publication information
- Schedule: Monthly
- Format: Limited series
- Genre: Superhero, parody, humor
- Publication date: Jan. 1984 – Dec. 1985
- No. of issues: 12
Collected editions
- Normalman - The Novel: ISBN 0-943151-00-7
- The Complete Normalman: ISBN 9781582408156

normalman is a limited series of American comic books created by Jim Valentino. It began in November 1983 as a four-page story in Cerebus #56 (Nov. 1983) before being launched as a full-color 12-issue series which was published by Aardvark-Vanaheim before moving to Renegade Press. There was also a crossover with Journey. The story of normalman concluded in normalman 3D Annual #1 (Renegade Press).

The series spoofed the comics of many comic book companies, including DC, Marvel, EC and Harvey, as well as doing parodies of The Spirit, Elfquest, Asterix, Star Wars, and The Wizard of Oz.

normalman was first collected in trade paperback by Slave Labor Graphics. Later a trade paperback which included several followups was published by Image Comics. Both trades are in black and white. In 2024, Image published a hardcover omnibus collecting the whole series in full color along with other material.

== Overview ==
On the planet Arnold, a junior CPA had come to the conclusion that Arnold would explode in eight hours. In a take on the origin of Superman, the junior CPA built a rocket ship to launch his infant son into deep space. As soon as he did so, he discovered that Arnold was not going to explode after all, leading his enraged wife to murder him. Twenty years later, the rocket carrying the now-grown baby ended up crashing into an Earth-like planet called Levram ("Marvel" spelled backwards), populated entirely by super powered people. Because he had no superpowers of any kind, the locals dubbed him "normalman".

Most of the super-powered inhabitants of Levram were disposed to violence ("fight scenes") and normalman (or "norm" for short) sought a way to leave Levram for good and return to Arnold. His allies in this endeavor were the impossibly powerful but cheerfully dimwitted Captain Everything (a spoof of Superman and Mighty Mouse, whose ability to negate all known laws of physics and invent new superpowers at every plot twist made him the most powerful being in the universe limited only by his considerable stupidity), the battle-ready Sgt. Fluffy, agent of S.C.H.M.U.C.K. (which, according to the footnotes, stood for "nothing in particular"), and the beautiful Sophisticated Lady who would become the love of his life. normalman had gained an enemy in the Ultra Conservative who saw him as a threat to Levram's status quo. A mysterious time-traveling woman calling herself the Countess of Monte Crisco (who debuted in a later issue) had plans of her own regarding both normalman and Fluffy's ruby slippers.

== Characters ==
=== Main characters ===
- normalman: The titular character, he was launched into space by his father (known alternately as Joe-L and Jerk-L) and after 20 years landed on Levram. He is the only person on Levram without super powers and tries to escape the planet, only to end back up there every time. He is usually the straight man for all the bizarre adventures and jokes going on in the series. It is revealed at the finale that his real name is Norm-L.
- Captain Everything: A spoof of Superman, Captain Marvel and Mighty Mouse, he can negate the laws of physics and create new powers for the sake of the plot. His only weakness is his stupidity, which interferes with his powers. At the finale, Captain Everything becomes the champion of the planet Arnold.
- Sophisticated Lady: norm's love interest, she once manipulated norm for the sake of Levram. Her powers are unknown. She marries Norm-L in the end, taking the name Soph-E.
- Ultra Conservative: The main antagonist, he wants to kill normalman, who he sees as a threat to the status quo. His powers are unknown but may include superhuman strength. He has a nephew called Rotten Kid, another antagonist. He and Rotten Kid are killed by Sgt. Fluffy who had been resurrected as Dark Fluffy.
- Countess of Monte Crisco: Another antagonist, she helped normalman get home only so she could get Fluffy's slippers and become super powerful. Captain Everything reflected one of her bolts and sent her to Oz, where she became the Wicked Witch of the East. She was later killed by Dorothy.

=== Recurring characters ===
- Sgt. Fluffy, Agent of S.C.H.M.U.C.K.: A spoof of Nick Fury, he is a spy working for S.C.H.M.U.C.K.. His ruby slippers ultimately are what get norm home. He is invulnerable to everything, but Silver Frostnite (Kryptonite), which kills him. He returns as Dark Fluffy (Dark Phoenix) and destroys Levram.
- Man-Man (pronounced "Mon-Man"): A Rastafarian-type character with the power of "Ganja Breath".
- Rotten Kid: Revealed to be the Ultra Conservative's nephew in a later issue, he is revealed to be behind such League adversaries as the Unnecessary A-Men (a parody of the Uncanny X-Men), Tight Teens (a parody of the Teen Titans) and Cloned Kids (a parody of the DNAgents). He is killed along with the Ultra Conservative by Dark Fluffy.
- Dr. Deranged: The Ultra Conservative's right-hand man, his name is a spoof of Doctor Strange.
- The Fanatical Four: A group sent by the Ultra Conservative to eliminate normalman. A parody of the Fantastic Four, they were Mr. Fanatical, Helpless Woman (later known as Not-so Helpless Woman), Humane Touch and the Lunk.
- Legion of Superfluous Heroes: A parody of the Legion of Super-Heroes. In their first appearance, Uranus Girl wanted to save normalman, but Lightweight Lad pointed out they needed to do roll call first. They appear throughout the series doing roll call (they have a seemly endless list of members). A recurring gag was the comic would go back to them at random moments. Lightweight Lad lost his place (thanks to Yelling Girl) and was going begin the roll call again, only to be killed by the members of the Legion (who also died). It is revealed the Legion was in a time loop.
- Justice League of Society: A parody of the Justice League. Members include:

- Captain Everything
- Human Person: Powers unknown.
- The Flesh: He is a nudist.
- Nastygirl: She can use her beauty to get men to do what she wants.
- Flatman: He is completely flat.
- Water-Logged Man: He has "water breath".
- Green Heartburn: He emits a beam causing heartburn and seems to suffer from it.
- Robin Hoodlum: He uses arrows similar to Green Arrow.
- Useless Kid: He is a random child that hangs out with the League.

== Bibliography ==
- The Complete normalman (Image Comics, 2007) ISBN 978-1-58240-815-6
