= Tia Texada =

American actress and model

- Occupation: Actress
- Years active: 1993–present
- Website: web.archive.org/web/20191120045843/https://tiatexada.com/

Tia Texada is an American actress and model. She is best known for her role as Sgt. Maritza Cruz on the NBC series Third Watch, and her recurring role as undercover agent Ribera on The Unit for CBS. Other roles include In Plain Sight, Saving Grace, Chuck, Mind of the Married Man, Everybody Hates Chris, The Amazing Spider-Man, Batman Beyond, Static Shock, Firebreather, and Handy Manny. Additionally, Texada was an announcer for the ESPY Awards and a spokesperson for various products, including Maybelline.

== Career ==
Texada's appearances include guest-starring roles in episodes of In Plain Sight, Chuck ("Chuck Versus the Coup d'Etat"), Saving Grace, Everybody Hates Chris, The Unit, and Criminal Minds. She played Sgt. Maritza Cruz in the NBC Drama Third Watch in the last three of its six seasons.

She also has appeared in movies such as From Dusk till Dawn (1996), Paulie (1998), Nurse Betty (2000), Bait (2000), Thirteen Conversations About One Thing (2001), Glitter (2001), Phone Booth (2003), and Spartan (2004).

Texada also has a singing career, and her songs have been featured on shows such as Dawson's Creek. She also played at the Lilith Fair tour in 1998.

She played the voice of Isabel Vasquez in the television film Firebreather. Texada has lent her voice to the animated series The Wild Thornberrys, and Static Shock, as well as television commercials. She additionally voiced Elena Valadis in Ben 10: Ultimate Alien.

Texada has also done layouts for magazines and has been featured in the men's magazines FHM and Maxim.

== Personal life ==
Tia Texada is of Venezuelan, Puerto Rican, Spanish, and French descent (and is also noted in some sources as having Ecuadorian heritage).

== Filmography ==
=== Film ===
Year	Title	Role	Notes
1993	Coming in Out of the Rain	Chrissy	
1996	From Dusk till Dawn	Bar Dancer	
1997	Run Away Car	Lupe	TV movie
1998	Shadow of a Doubt	Conchita Perez	
1998	Paulie	Ruby/Lupe (voice)	
1998	The Unknown Cyclist	Lola	
1999	The Thirteenth Floor	Natasha's Roommate	
2000	Nurse Betty	Rosa Hernandez	
2000	Bait	Tika	
2001	Thirteen Conversations About One Thing	Dorrie	
2001	Glitter	Roxanne	
2002	Crazy as Hell	Lupa	
2002	Phone Booth	Asia	
2003	Welcome to the Neighborhood	Stephanie	
2004	Spartan	Jackie Black	
2006	5up 2down	Maria	
2008	Black Crescent Moon	Darla Rosepetal	
2010	Firebreather	Isabel (voice)	TV movie
2010	Finding Hope Now	Mrs. Villanueva	
2012	The Amazing Spider-Man	Sheila (Subway)	
2014	Finding Hope Now	Mrs. Villanueva	
2021	Killer Cheer Mom	Detective Sanchez	TV movie

=== Television ===
Year	Title	Role	Notes
1995	Land's End	Corina	Episode: "El Perico"
1996	Sisters	P.A.	Episode: "A Sudden Change of Heart"
1996	CBS Schoolbreak Special	-	Episode: "Crosstown"
1996	High Tide	-	Episode: "Code Name: Scorpion"
1996	Malibu Shores	Kacey Martinez	Main Cast
1996	ER	Gloria Lopez	Episode: "Homeless for the Holidays"
1997	NYPD Blue	Wanda Diaz	Episode: "A Wrecking Experience"
1998	Ask Harriet	Maria Garcia	Episode: "Pilot"
1998	Fame L.A.	Tasha	Episode: "Green Eyed Monster"
1998	Brooklyn South	Sylvia	Episode: "Queens for a Day"
1999–2000	The Wild Thornberrys	Santusa (voice)	Guest Cast: Season 1 & 3
1999	Arli$$	-	Episode: "The Stories You Don't Hear About"
1999	Working	Female Rebel	Episode: "The Other Executive"
2000	Batman Beyond	Trina (voice)	Episode: "Payback"
2000–04	Static Shock	Talon/Rita Velasquez (voice)	Recurring Cast
2001	As Told by Ginger	Villager #2 (voice)	Episode: "I Spy a Witch"
2001	The Mind of the Married Man	Missy's Roommate	Episode: "Wonderful News"
2002	The American Embassy	Marissa	Episode: "Pilot"
2002–05	Third Watch	Sergeant Maritza Cruz	Main Cast: Season 4-6
2006–07	The Unit	Marianna Ribera	Guest Cast: Season 2-3
2006–09	Handy Manny	Mrs. Alvarez (voice)	Guest Cast: Season 1-2
2007	CSI: Miami	Jane Duncroft	Episode: "Miami Confidential"
2008	Criminal Minds	Detective Tina Lopez	Episode: "In Heat"
2008	Everybody Hates Chris	Ms. Rivera	Episode: "Everybody Hates the English Teacher"
2010	Saving Grace	-	Episode: "Loose Men in Tight Jeans"
2010	Huge	Shay	Recurring Cast
2010	Chuck	Hortensia Goya	Episode: "Chuck Versus the Coup d'Etat"
2011	In Plain Sight	Evita	Episode: "Something A-mish"
2011	Ben 10: Ultimate Alien	Elena Validus (voice)	Guest Cast: Season 2-3
2014	Turbo FAST	Simone (voice)	Episode: "Mall Is Well"
2017	Stitchers	Dr. Sophia Torres	Episode: "Perfect"

=== Video Games ===
Year	Title	Role	Notes
2005	True Crime: New York City	Street Racing Promoter (voice)	
2008	Speed Racer: The Videogame	Denise Mobile (voice)	
2014	Lightning Returns: Final Fantasy XIII	Additional Voices (voice)	
