= Firebreather (comics) =

Comic book

- Cover to Firebreather Volume 1 collected TPB.

Publication information
- Publisher: Image Comics
- First appearance: Firebreather #1 (January 2003)
- Created by: Phil Hester; Andy Kuhn

In-story information
- Alter ego: Duncan Xerxes Absalom Wu Fan Cassius Draco Draconus Quetzelcoatl Gondwana Mjarl Khan Belloc-Rosenblatt Jr.
- Team affiliations: The Pact
- Notable aliases: Duncan Rosenblatt; Orange Iguana
- Abilities: Dragon mimicry; Bulletproof skin; Water breathing; Claw retraction; Fire breath; Flight (via bat-like Dragon wings); Superhuman strength; Superhuman durability; Superhuman endurance; Superhuman agility; Superhuman reflexes; Superhuman hearing; Night vision

Firebreather is a comic book created by Phil Hester and Andy Kuhn and published by Image Comics. Set in the Image Universe, the series focuses on the life of a teenage half-dragon Duncan Rosenblatt. The story has been told in a mini-series (2003) and a one-shot (2004). An ongoing series started in May 2008, and a film based on the series aired on Cartoon Network on November 24, 2010. Following the publication of a crossover series, The Pact, Duncan was incorporated into Invincible as a supporting character.

== Publication history ==
The character was originally part of a Young Avengers proposal that Hester put together for Marvel Comics. He was initially conceived to be the son of Fin Fang Foom, a concept later referenced in the Marvel Comics series The Unbelievable Gwenpool.

It was reworked into a miniseries at Image Comics in 2003. A one-shot followup, The Iron Saint was published in 2004. The character returned in an ongoing series in 2008. Four issues of the ongoing series were published, followed by a third volume in 2010. Two issues of this Holmgang story were released, leaving the series unfinished.

== Plot ==
=== Early life ===
Duncan Rosenblatt is the son of the human Margaret Rosenblatt and the 100 ft. dragon Belloc who rules over the monsters. This makes Duncan a hybrid of both species. He gains powers because of this with a side effect of physical reptilian traits and recurring temperamental issues.

=== Firebreather Volume 1: (Growing Pains #1–4) ===
Duncan and Margaret move to Progress, Utah where Duncan begins his first day at yet another new school, trying to fit in despite his unusual physical appearance. Duncan and Margaret are supported by Col. Frank Barnes, the leader of a military unit called Strikeforce that formerly hunted Belloc and other monsters until a truce was made. However, there are great many obstacles to this goal, particularly his new principal who doesn't like him and a bully named Troy. He does make a few friends amongst other outcasts like Kenny and Dre, as well as Jenna Shwartzendruber, a senior peer counselor whom he develops feelings for. Over the weekend at his father Belloc's place, Duncan goes through a rough training course to master his Dragon powers. Belloc is training him not only to be powerful, but he wants Duncan to learn things the hard way. Back at school, Duncan throws a dodgeball hard into Troy's face during gym class. So for a little payback, Troy tries to set Duncan up by hiding his dad's gun in his locker. It works, but the reaction is far more than what Troy wanted. This leads to Duncan seriously thinking about his control over his emotions and if he truly belongs in the world with humans.

When he returns home, it is demolished and Margaret is missing. He tracks down his mother and her kidnapper, a monster from Monster Island. He and the monster have a brutal fight which ends (at least as far as Duncan is concerned) with Duncan blasting the monster with flame, leaving the monster badly burned but alive. This changes when Belloc arrives on the scene and impales the monster with his tail. Duncan figures out that Belloc arranged the kidnapping to test him and threatens to kill him if he ever endangers his mother again. After Duncan flies away, Belloc smiles to himself, saying, "There's my boy".

=== Firebreather: The Iron Saint ===
Duncan's class is taken abroad by their Spanish teacher Mr. Martinez, who shows them the sights of London, before making their way to Spain. While in London, the group hears the story of "The Iron Saint", a long forgotten being that was created to fight, and survive, the King of the Monsters. The suit of armor has been passed down for generations and generations, and now it's just a museum piece. Duncan learns of its history, and its connection to him, and can't help but be curious. When he and Kenny investigate, they find that the suit has been brought back to life and it's out to get Duncan. The wearer of the armor turns out to be Mr. Martinez, who is revealed to not only be an S.O.S. escort but a survivor of an attack on a Cuban village and a former agent of Strikeforce. He attempts to use the armor to kill Duncan as revenge for Belloc killing his parents when he was a child. However, Duncan is saved due to his half-human heritage, since the armor cannot draw human blood or else it will be destroyed and kill all life on Earth. The Iron Saint dissolves and Martinez is apprehended by Barnes. On the plane to Spain, Duncan accidentally scratches Jenna's cheek with his claw, but she claims it didn't hurt.

=== The Pact ===
Belloc becomes furious when Duncan refuses to visit him on Father's Day and goes on a rampage burning a neighborhood. Duncan, now taking the name ‘Firebreather' is told of this by passing bullies, and flies off to stop him. Shadowhawk, Invincible, and Zephyr Noble, all get word of Belloc's rampage as well and join in together to fight him. Things spur out of control until Duncan yells at the three other teen heroes to cease their attack and reasons with his father to halt his assault. The four later decide to form a friend group and are put through a series of adventures.

=== Firebreather Volume 2: (1-6) ===
Duncan turns 16 when extraterrestrial robots, that fought Belloc and his monsters centuries ago, return to Earth to kill him. They carve the word "Holmgang" into places where Duncan goes, but he manages to defeat most of them. However they manage to fatally injure his father after a prolonged fight. Belloc summons Duncan to his location but despite Duncan's pleadings, Belloc chooses to die, and Duncan destroys the last robot.

=== Firebreather: Holmgang ===
Duncan returns home on a long journey after his father's death but he doesn't tell Barnes or Margaret about it. After returning to school, he spends a night with Kenny, beating up a gang of bullies who injure him with a beer can and Kenny's abusive father. He acts on his feelings for Jenna by asking her to the Prom after two recent failed attempts to go on a date with her. She turns down his offer, admitting that she only cares for him as a friend, as well as being years older than him. Duncan misreads this as her rejecting him for his Dragon heritage, but Jenna states that he has remained oblivious of classmate Isabel Vasques' growing feelings for him and their shared interests. Duncan flies off to his father's lair where guarding robots mistake him for Belloc and let him in, where Duncan hears a heated message from his mother on Belloc's answering machine. Duncan later decides to ask Isabel to the prom, while she declines at first for him not asking her on a date before, she accepts, with Duncan getting a part in the school play in the process. While getting ready for prom, Belloc's human lawyer Mr. Go comes to the Rosenblatt house, revealing that Marge and him both know about Belloc's death. This leaves Duncan upset that they let him live with the guilt of not telling them before. Mr. Go then offers to be Duncan's chauffeur to the prom. During Duncan and Isabel's dance, a fire breaks out destroying half the school, and Duncan is confronted by a large green dragon claiming to be his brother, ending the series on a cliffhanger.

== In other media ==
An animated CGI film adaptation based on the comics aired November 24, 2010, on Cartoon Network. The film starred the voices of Jesse Head as Duncan Rosenblatt, Dana Delany as Margaret Rosenblatt, Kevin Michael Richardson as King Belloc, Josh Keaton as Troy, Gary Anthony Williams as Principal Dave, Reed Diamond as "Blitz" Barnes, and Amy Davidson as Jenna Shwartzendruber.

== Collections ==
- Firebreather, Vol 1 (collects v1, #1–4 and "Iron Saint" one-shot)
- Firebreather, V2: All the Best Heroes Are Orphans (collects v2, #1–4)
- Firebreather, V3: Holmgang (collects "Holmgang" 1–4) (unpublished)
