= Jimmie Robinson =

American comic book creator (born 1963)

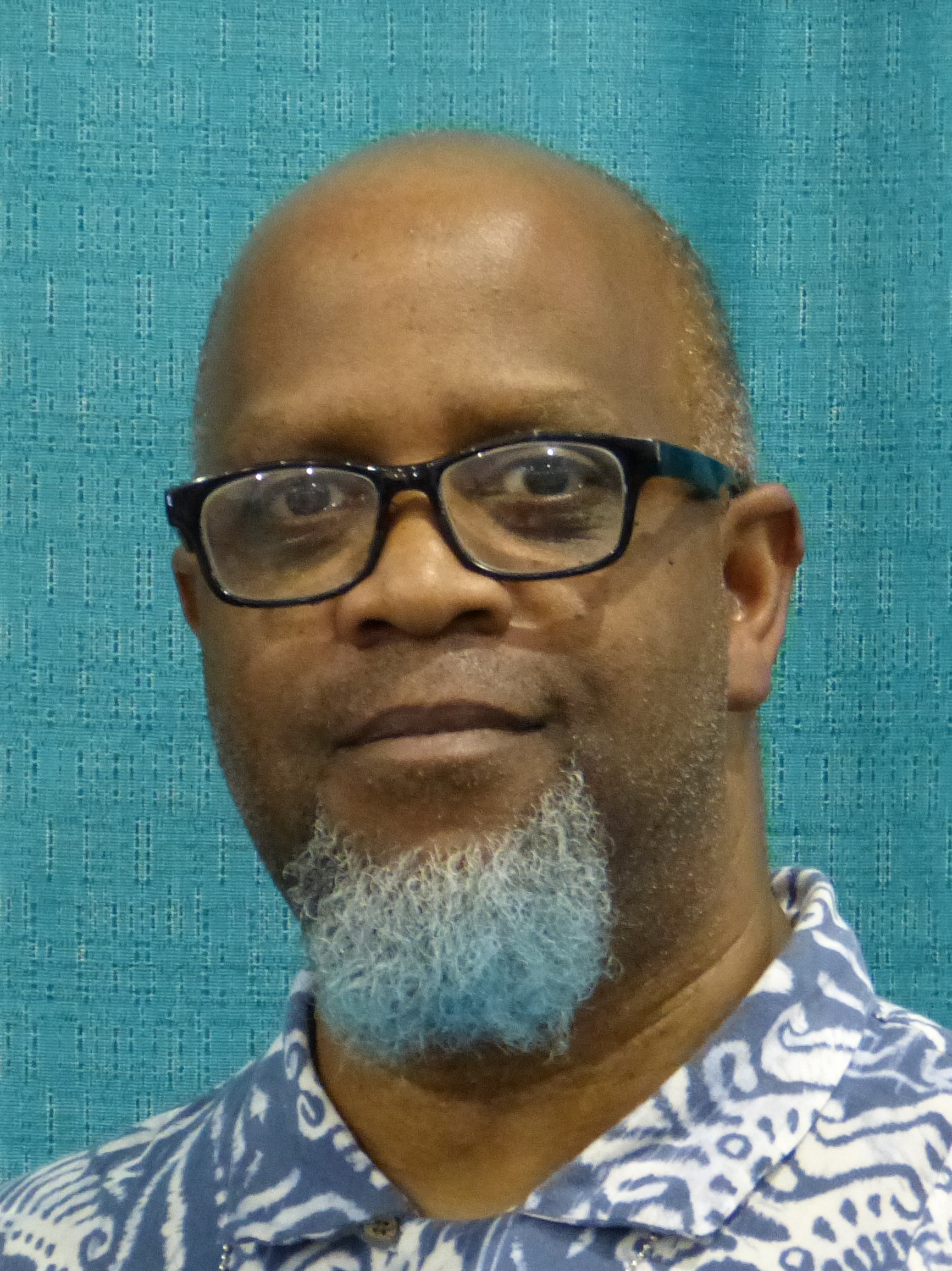
- Robinson in 2017
- Born: 1963 (age 62–63) California
- Areas: Cartoonist, Writer, Artist, Inker, Publisher, Colourist
- Notable works: Bomb Queen
- Awards: Inkpot Award (2015)

Jimmie Robinson (born 1963 in California) is an American comic book creator, known for writing and drawing the comic book series Bomb Queen, and for other works, including Amanda and Gunn, Avigon, Code Blue, Evil & Malice, Five Weapons, The Empty, Power Lines, and Junk Rabbit, most of which have been published by Image Comics.

== Biography ==
=== Early life and education ===
Robinson grew up in Oakland, California, and attended Mosswood Arts, Renaissance Middle School, and Concordia High School.

=== Career ===
After working as a commercial artist and starting a family, Robinson entered the comics industry in 1994, publishing eight issues of Cyberzone under his own Jet Black Graphiks imprint. A science fiction story, it featured a lesbian black bounty hunter named Amanda Shane, and her artificially-intelligent gun. In 1996, Image Comics published a four-issue spin-off titled Amanda & Gunn.

A 1997 follow-up called Code Blue – a medical drama in the style of ER in comics format – was canceled after a single issue. His next series was the color, all-ages Adventures of Evil & Malice about the secretly heroic daughters of a super-villain. Robinson then turned to illustrating writer Ché Gilson's Avigon, first published in 2000 as a 56-page story, then an expanded 184-page version in 2005 as Avigon: Gods And Demons.

In 2006 he began the action/humor series Bomb Queen, starring a "bad girl" super-villain who rules over a lawless city that is a haven for every kind of criminal and evil-doer. The first mini-series was successful, leading to seven additional mini-series as of 2020.

He scripted the one-shot What if? Wolverine: Enemy of the State for Marvel Comics in 2008. He collaborated with writer Derek McCulloch, illustrating T. Runt!, a children's book about an undersized Tyrannosaurus rex, published in 2009.

In 2013-2014, Robinson produced Five Weapons, a drama about a 13-year-old boy at a special school where the children of assassins learn the family trade. Originally intended as a five-issue mini-series, a five-issue sequel followed. In 2015 he began publishing The Empty, a science-fiction story in which two unlike women set out together to save a dying world.

He received an Inkpot Award at the San Diego Comic Convention International in 2015. He was chosen as one of six judges for the 2019 Eisner Awards.
