= Firebreather (film) =

2010 television film directed by Peter Chung

- Promotional poster
- Genre: Adventure; Dark fantasy; Superhero
- Based on: Firebreather by: Phil Hester; Andy Kuhn
- Written by: Jim Krieg
- Directed by: Peter Chung
- Voices of: Jesse Head; Dana Delany; Kevin Michael Richardson; Dante Basco; Tia Texada; Reed Diamond; Amy Davidson
- Ending theme: "Warlocks" by Red Hot Chili Peppers
- Composer: Toby Chu
- Country of origin: United States
- Original language: English

Production
- Executive producer: Julia Pistor
- Producer: Carrie Wilksen
- Editors: Peter Tomaszewicz; Billy Weber
- Running time: 69 minutes
- Production companies: Pistor Productions; Cartoon Network Studios

Original release
- Network: Cartoon Network
- Release: November 24, 2010

Firebreather is an American animated CGI superhero television film, based on the Image Comics comic book series of the same name, which premiered on November 24, 2010, on Cartoon Network. It was directed by Peter Chung from a screenplay by James Krieg based on a story of Phil Hester and Andy Kuhn, and stars the voices of Jesse Head, Dana Delany, Kevin Michael Richardson, Reed Diamond, Dante Basco, Tia Texada, and Amy Davidson.

== Plot ==
On the final day of the war between humans and the giant monsters known as Kaiju, the king of all kaijus, Belloc, a dragon-like being, attacks a city. But during the attack, a human woman, Margaret Rosenblatt, confronts him; they fall in love. Because of this, Belloc ceases his attack and leaves with Margaret.

Some time after this, they both have a son, named Duncan.

Sixteen years later, Margaret and Duncan, are moving into a new house as he prepares to attend a new school. However, Duncan fears that his Kaiju-like appearance and abilities, will make him a target for bullies. At school, he quickly develops a crush on a popular girl Jenna and makes an enemy out of her ex-boyfriend Troy Adams. In biology class, Duncan befriends fellow outcasts Kenny and Isabel, the latter who happens to be a Kaiju-obsessed fangirl and develops a crush on him.

Late that evening, Troy's friends break into Jenna's locker and steal the money she was holding for the school's Homecoming. The next day, Duncan meets "Blitz" Barnes, an agent of M.E.G.T.A.F. who is working undercover as a gym teacher and takes him to Dr. Pytel at the M.E.G.T.A.F. base after discovering his ability to breathe fire. Later, while Duncan and Troy are cleaning the cafeteria, Isabel tells Duncan about a party that everybody will be going to and he agrees to go in hopes of impressing Jenna.

At the party, Troy tries to tell Jenna about Duncan until Troy's father comes and drags him back home for being out while grounded. Duncan and Jenna begin to form a friendship but she abruptly leaves after he talks about Troy's father. Duncan learns from Isabel that Jenna’s father died some time ago. However, Belloc arrives looking for Duncan, taking him to his lair in the desert and revealing his desire to have him succeed him as king of the Kaiju. Then Belloc presents Duncan as his heir to the other Kaiju and throws him into a lava pit; Duncan emerges in his Kaiju form and faints from the transition.

Waking in the desert, Duncan encounters Kenny, who tells him that Isabel told him about Belloc being his father and asks why he was at the party. Duncan replies that Isabel invited him, causing Kenny to become jealous. Back home with his mother, she assures him that the move and deal with M.E.G.T.A.F. were to let him live a normal life and eventually go to college.

Back in school, Duncan is surprised that everyone except Troy now treats him like a celebrity. Isabel reveals that it is because she told them about him "saving" them from Belloc. Meanwhile, Jenna discovers a red crystal in her locker that, unbeknownst to her, was gifted by Duncan to sell and pay for Homecoming.

Later, Isabel attempts to approach Duncan but loses her chance when he and Jenna meet up again. He asks Jenna to be his date for Homecoming, and she agrees. Afterwards, Blitz takes Duncan into the desert to locate the Kaiju lair, but they fall under attack. Duncan almost kills the Kaiju, but refuses to do so, before Belloc surrenders.

That night, Duncan, Jenna, Kenny, Isabel, and Margaret go to the dance together. As Jenna and Duncan dance together, Isabel watches them despite Kenny's attempts to get her to dance with him. However, after Troy and Jenna are elected Homecoming King and Queen and go on stage, Isabel romantically dances with Duncan, enraging Kenny. He claims to Duncan that Isabel only likes him because of Belloc being his father, in which Jenna overhears, causing him to storm out. As Isabel reprimands Kenny, two Kaiju named Abbadon and Astaroth appear.

As Abbadon and Astaroth wreak havoc, Duncan fights them so his friends can get to safety. The two Kaiju attempt to kill Blitz, but Duncan manifests wings to save him from falling off a cliff. Margaret and Jenna head off in a plane to get help from Belloc, who helps Duncan fight the Kaiju. Duncan, refusing to kill them, causes an avalanche to fall, freezing them solid. Subsequently, Belloc allows himself to be recaptured and carried away to be closer to Duncan, and Jenna (who had earlier realized that it was Duncan who had left the red gem) apologizes to Duncan for her earlier behavior, and Duncan flies off with his new wings.

== Voice cast ==
- Jesse Head as Duncan Rosenblatt
- Dana Delany as Margaret Rosenblatt
- Kevin Michael Richardson as Belloc
- Amy Davidson as Jenna Shwartzendruber
- Tia Texada as Isabel Vasques
- Dante Basco as Kenneth "Kenny" Rogers
- Reed Diamond as Agent "Blitz" Barnes
- Josh Keaton as Troy Adams
- Grey DeLisle as Julia Dreakford
- Billy Evans as Steve
- Jameson Moss as Big Rob
- Nicole Sullivan as Dr. Alexandrine Pytel
- Tom Tartamella as Whitey
- Gary Anthony Williams as Principal Dave and Troy's Dad
- Frank Welker as Astaroth (uncredited)
- Paul St. Peter as Abaddon (uncredited)

== Reception ==
Mania.com's Rob Worley viewed Firebreather at the New York Comic Con, awarding the film a B+ and stating "Teen Angst + Kaiju Big Battle = CG Awesome!," but criticizing how the animation could be "... somewhat distracting as the characters sometimes have a puppet-like appearance." Worley concluded that he would like to see the film turned into a franchise or a TV series.

R.L. Shaffer of IGN rated the film 6/10, saying that it was "hardly impressive on any level", but "enjoyable", and that it would appeal to younger audiences. Brian Lowry of Variety called the film "generally a bore between battles", calling the monsters "a sight to behold", but wishing the protagonist spent "less time in school". David Hinckley of the New York Daily News stated that "in general, it succeeds", calling its romance elements "chaste" and "just to make things interesting for someone other than 10-year-old boys".

== Home media ==
The film was released on DVD and Blu-ray on March 22, 2011. Bonus features include a 2D animation test, deleted scenes, animatics, and a visual development featurette.
