= Trencher (comics) =

1993 comic book series by Kieth Giffen

- Cover of the first issue

Publication information
- Publisher: Image Comics
- Schedule: Monthly
- Format: Ongoing series
- Genre: Humor/comedy
- Publication date: May–October, 1993
- No. of issues: 4
- Main character(s): Trencher; Supreme; Elvis; Shadowhawk; Blitz: the manic mandrill Mr. Monster; Sharky; Spawn

Creative team
- Written by: Keith Giffen
- Artist: Keith Giffen
- Letterer: Lovern Kindzierski
- Colorist: Lovern Kindzierski

Trencher is an American comic book series, that was created, written and drawn by Keith Giffen and released by Image Comics in 1993. It totaled only four issues before it ended, with a 5th issue indicated in the end caption, and an ad for a 5th issue in Images of ShadowHawk #2. However there never was a 5th issue and the next Trencher appearances was in Images of Shadowhawk #1–3 in 1993 also from Image Comics, Trencher X-Mas Bites Holiday Blow-Out in December 1994, and in Blackball Comics #1 in March 1994, both from short-lived UK publisher Blackball Comics. Giffen illustrated this in a sort of twisted ligne Claire style with some hyper-detailed elements of Geoff Darrow. All stories are ultraviolent and a parody of the then prevalent "Image Comics style".

== Plot ==
The story follows a zombie-like anti-hero named Gideon Trencher, as he endeavors to complete his mission of exterminating souls which had been "wrongfully reincarnated". Due to the large superhuman population this often brought him in conflict with super-powered beings both important (Supreme and ShadowHawk) to the minor (The Nasal Python, who has the ability to use his nose hairs as fully functioning appendages, and The Hurler, who can utilize pinpoint projectile vomit as a weapon.)

It's Gideon's job to hunt down these beings, with the assistance of a voice in his head named Phoebe, who is his dispatcher, giving him information on his targets, his surroundings, and who also serves as character foil for the otherwise isolated character. He moves from one name on the list to the next, usually receiving heavy damage to his body, frequently resulting in what should be fatal injuries (such as having his head blown from his body).

An unknown organization has designed many of these "trencher" units, who seemingly are resurrected and re-outfitted corpses (similar to deadmen in Gungrave) who are sent on separate missions.

Gideon is frequently involved in situations that largely make little sense within their own context, but continue author Keith Giffen's well known satire. From hunting down four separate Elvis possessed bodies who are each a variation on the beings who replaced Superman after his death in the DC universe, to engaging in a major smack down with superhero Supreme, Gideon endures constant abuse throughout the series until it abruptly ends at issue four, although his story picks up immediately in Images of ShadowHawk 1–3.

In Images of ShadowHawk, Trencher fights Shadowhawk without the obligatory later team-up. They both want to get to a former mob boss Carmine "The Blowhole" Oliveri but for different reasons. As Shadowhawk eventually overcomes Trencher by cutting his intestines, Trencher in fact hanging from a building and falling to the street, ShadowHawk reaches Oliveri who is actually possessed by Twilight Runner and blows out Oliveri's brain.

Trencher and ShadowHawk, however, cross paths not long after these events, with the "Shadowhawk: The monster within" storyline. With Trencher fully regenerated after his last encounter with ShadowHawk, his dispatcher Phoebe watches Shadowhawk struggle with his ever dwindling chances of finding a cure for his AIDS infection and leaves Trencher to assist ShadowHawk for a time; transporting him throughout alternia in an attempt to find a cure. Trencher, now alone in New York, goes on repossessing souls on his own, though he bitterly complains to Phoebe upon return that he requires the dispatch info to do his job properly. The series ends with Trencher killing a sub-demon who was attacking both ShadowHawk and Spawn, and then telling Shadowhawk that there was never a cure and that he just needs to accept his inevitable death, after handing him (Shadowhawk) a loaded gun, Trencher walks away.

In Trencher X-Mas Bites Holiday Blow-Out, Trencher fights a mad scientist Dr. Tushman, who after removing a missile from the sphincter of one Blazin' Glory (a Captain America parody) is caught in a massive radioactive fart and transformed into a shadow being. He hunts down people, collecting their farts and killing them until he comes across Trencher.

In Blackball Comics #1 Trencher is pitted against Blitz the Manic Mandrill created by Simon Bisley. It's a silent issue with no captions and no written dialogue only with drawn balloons and sound effects. The issue is a reference to the "Death of Superman" storyline, with several of the panels in the fight being direct send-ups of the Doomsday fight, along with a note from "the editors" pointing out how apologetic they are for letting an otherwise intelligent character get pulled into such a mindless slugfest. The book ends with the two characters blowing up themselves and everything else, still fighting, though being reduced to disembodied heads, they keep spitting at each other, as they can't (or won't) stop trying to one-up the other.

Trencher later reappears as a cameo in Dave Elliot's Sharky (Issue 4). Where he and a number of other superheroes (Savage Dragon, Flaming Carrot, Mr. Monster etc.) are summoned from the demigod Sharky's mind (As these characters are all of his favorite comic book characters) to assist him in battling his enemies. Trencher fights alongside the other heroes until Sharky no longer needs their assistance, leading him and the other heroes fade away.

The "Not quite a crossover" short story, previewing the unfinished Blackball Comics #3, involves Mr. Monster detonating a nuclear devise and nearly burying Trencher, Mr. Monster assumes that nothing could have survived the blast (though he had no idea that Trencher was near the explosion), and leaves as Trencher is seen covered in debris with a rather disgruntled expression.

Trencher's final appearance was in the unfinished Blackball Comics #3, which would later be published years after its cancellation in the trade paperback "Mr. Monster's books of forbidden knowledge volume 0" under the reworked title "Never Touch A Satan Glass!" (Along with "Not quite a crossover") The story was meant to feature an epic slugfest between Giffen's Trencher and Gilbert's Mr. Monster, both of which were being illustrated by their respective creators in a collaborative effort, but Blackball Comics went bankrupt after Blackball Comics #1 and the initially thirty-page fight was left at an unfinished 6 pages. Gilbert would later release the unfinished story with an additional seventh page to conclude it. The story then picks up with Trencher going to Mr. Monster's mountain to repossess the soul of his secretary, but find's out that he has the wrong address and has attacked the wrong mountain, he trips over a child while attempting to leave and drags Mr. Monster's secretary with him through the Satan Glass which happens to be a direct doorway to hell. The glass shatters and Mr. Monster laments how he'll miss his beloved secretary because his taxes are due and she's not here to do them, only to find out that Trencher had grabbed a mannequin instead of the secretary. Trencher, now in hell, talks appreciatively to the mannequin, whom he still believes to be the secretary, complementing her on her quiet mannerisms, and asking it if she knows how to file tax returns.

== Personality and abilities ==
Trencher has a very dry and gruff tone, with an almost "been there, done that" mentality. As Giffen put it "he'd have already killed himself if he weren't already dead" Trencher has been described by Keith Giffen as being a more blue collar working man type character, as opposed to his other character Lobo, which Trencher has at times been labeled a knock off. His job as a repo-man, collecting souls, also conveys the general unpleasantness of his position, implying that he has good reason to hate his messy, un-respected and thankless job. Trencher almost never displays overt rage, in many ways his anger is illustrated by the more imposing he becomes as a character the more annoyed he gets at not accomplishing his task. The Images of Shadowhawk issues illustrate this well, where Trencher's frustration over Shadowhawk's constant intervention with every attempt he makes to eliminate his target, leading to him devastating an entire hospital in an attempt to remove Shadowhawk from the equation. He also never quite ever opens his mouth when he speaks, preferring to talk through gritted teeth, often out of the side of his mouth, he is rarely seen without a cigarette.

Trencher also has a regenerative healing factor and super strength, however, it seems that both of these are slightly controlled by Phoebe, who also can initiate programs within Trencher's body, at one point injecting an adrenal burst into his system so that he could stand toe to toe against Supreme and have an even chance in the fight. The adrenal burst, however, cannot be sustained long, as it will burn Trencher's body up from the inside out, but its initiation allows him to fight even top tier, near godlike, characters for a short time.

Trencher also possesses a large arsenal of heavy weapons, and is quite proficient in marksmanship. Though he tends to get very close to his targets and use rapid fire weapons to blow them to pulp in order to make sure they're dead, as he is much more dangerous up close due to his physical strength and high caliber weaponry make it near impossible to escape him close range.

== Status ==
Giffen stated in a 2008 interview that, "There is not a chance Trencher will ever appear in another comic book...I've moved on. The character doesn't interest me anymore. Never say never, but...never."

== Collected editions ==
Boom! Studios released a Trencher trade paperback reprinting the four issues.

There is no collections of the Images of ShadowHawk 1–3, Blackball Comics issue 1, and Trencher X-Mas Bites Holiday Blowout issues on the internet, but all can be found in back issue bins.

Mr. Monster's Books Of Forbidden Knowledge Volume 0 (Trade Paperback), contains The "Not quite a crossover" and the unfinished Blackball Comics Issue 3 retitled "Never Touch A Satan Glass"

Dave Elliot's Sharky (Hardcover) Issue 4

ShadowHawk: Chronicles (Trade Paperback) collects most of Shadowhawk: The monster within, but is missing Badrock and Company #6 and ShadowHawk #0, which completes the "monster within" story arc.
