= Shadowline =

Imprint of Image Comics founded by Jim Valentino

- Parent company: Image Comics
- Founded: 1993
- Founder: Jim Valentino
- Key people: Jim Valentino; Kristen Simon
- Official website: shadowlinecomics.tumblr.com

Shadowline, Inc., is an imprint of Image Comics established by Image co-founder Jim Valentino. The name is an homage to Valentino's character, ShadowHawk.

== History ==
Shadowline was officially created in December 1992 when the logo first appeared on the inside front cover of Jim Valentino's ShadowHawk #3. The first book to sport the logo on its cover was Shadowline Special #1 (October, 1994).

In January 1997, Shadowline became more commonly referred to as the “Non-Line” with the publication of A Touch of Silver #1. The name referred to the fact that the comics in the line at that time were not in any way aligned with one another. There was no singular universe or line. Hence, non-line.

On August 25, 1999, Jim Valentino became the publisher of Image Comics and while he did not publish his own work (so as not to create a conflict of interest), other books in the Non-Line continued. When Erik Larsen eventually took over as the publisher, Valentino returned to the Non-Line and to publishing his own work.

In July 2004 with the publication of the normalman 20th Anniversary Special, the name Shadowline was reborn. The first new book to have the Shadowline logo on the cover after the rebirth was Shadowhawk v. II #1 (May, 2005). Other titles to be created by Valentino, but executed by different creative teams were Blacklight, Task Force 1, The Intimidators and Emissary.

Today, Shadowline not only publishes Jim Valentino's properties but also properties owned by other creators such as Jimmie Robinson, Ted McKeever, Jeff Mariotte, Mike Mayhhew, Steve Niles and Michael Cavallaro.

== Who Wants To Create a Super-Heroine contest ==
In December 2007 Shadowline announced a contest for writers to send in a submission for a three-issue limited series featuring an all-new, creator-owned superheroine. While it was announced in April 2008 that Tom Arguello was declared the winner for his entry, Incredible Journey the book itself never did go to print due to a lack of customer/comic-shop support through pre-orders. However, shortly after ComicCon 2008 it was announced that contest finalist Kat Cahill would have her semi-finalist submission I Hate Gallant Girl published by Shadowline with Seth Damoose as the series artist. Three issues of I Hate Gallant Girl were published between December 2008 and February 2009.

== Shadowlinecomics.com ==
On June 25, 2008, the Shadowline website was relaunched.

In the weeks and months that followed the site became home to a number of webcomics, including Brat-halla, Chicago:1968, Finder and Yenny. Later additions include Hannibal Goes to Rome, Action, Ohio, Platinum Grit, Nightmare World, Li'l Depressed Boy and the Mundane Overrated Misadventures of Spudman.

== Silverline Books ==
Along with the relaunch of the website in 2008 came the announcement of an all-ages sub-imprint for the company called Silverline Books. Silverline was created as a way to clearly define the all-ages books for easier reference for parents, librarians and others. It was done to assist in allowing anyone to separate those titles from Shadowline's more mature offerings such as Bomb Queen and The Roberts.

Among the titles that will see print under the Silverline Books banner are Dear Dracula, Bruce The Little Blue Spruce, Missing the Boat and any future versions of PX!, The Surreal Adventures of Edgar Allan Poo, "Timothy and the Transgalactic Towel," "Rocketbots," and "Night of the Bedbugs."

== ShadowlineOnline.com ==
In the early part of 2011 the Shadowline website was renamed to ShadowlineOnline and the website was relaunched once again.

Along with the relaunch came a new webcomic, The Tales of Mr. Rhee, a spinoff of Dirk Manning's Nightmare World. Additionally, the website also runs a feature every Monday that gives details on any new comics that come out each week and on every Friday there is a 10 Questions interview with a given Shadowline creator.

As of August 2016 the website is no longer active.
