= Jim Valentino =

American comic creator (born 1952)

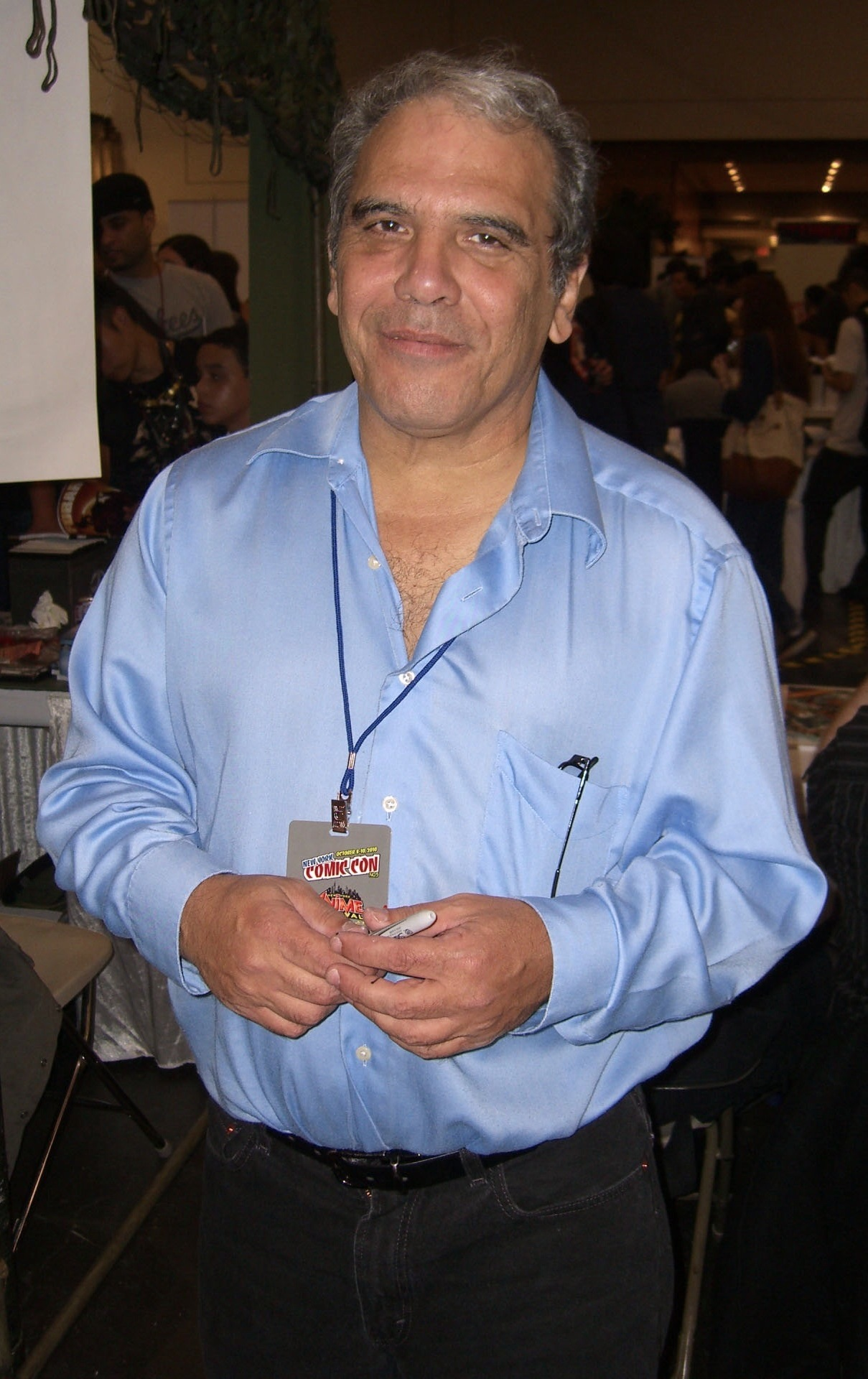
- Valentino at the New York Comic Con in Manhattan, October 9, 2010
- Born: October 28, 1952 (age 74) Bronx, New York, U.S.
- Areas: Writer, Penciller, Inker, Editor, Publisher
- Notable works: Guardians of the Galaxy normalman ShadowHawk
- Awards: Inkpot Award (1984)

Jim Valentino (born October 28, 1952) is an American writer, penciler, editor and publisher of comic books, best known for his 1990–1992 work on Guardians of the Galaxy for Marvel Comics, and for co-founding Image Comics, a company publishing creator-owned comics.

At Image Comics, Valentino produced books such as the superhero vigilante series ShadowHawk, and the 1997 semi-autobiographical black and white book A Touch of Silver. Valentino also served as publisher of Image from 1999 to 2003, during which he oversaw the diversification of Image's publication through his discovery of creators such as Robert Kirkman, who co-created the critically and commercially successful comic book The Walking Dead.

== Early life ==
Valentino was born on October 28, 1952, in the Bronx, New York.

== Career ==
=== 1970s–1992 ===
Cover to The Complete normalman trade paperback collecting the series

Valentino began his career in the late 1970s, creating small press and mostly autobiographical comics. The early-mid-1980s saw normalman, which first appeared as a back-up story in Aardvark-Vanaheim's comic book series Cerebus. Aardvark-Vanaheim's Dave Sim and Deni Loubert (Sim's wife at the time) began publishing normalman as a 13-issue limited series but only did so until #8, when Loubert began her own publishing company, Renegade Press, which finished the series. Renegade also published three issues of Valentino's self-titled series in the mid-late 1980s.

In the late 1980s, Valentino began working for Marvel Comics on their superhero titles. He was writer/artist on the future-set superhero series Guardians of the Galaxy, selected issues of What If...?, and fill-ins on most of Marvel's major titles. Valentino, a longtime fan of Guardians of the Galaxy, submitted his pitch for a new series on the group to editor-in-chief Tom DeFalco at the 1989 WonderCon. Coincidentally, DeFalco had already written his own proposal for a Guardians of the Galaxy series, but preferred Valentino's, and approved that proposal instead. That book launched in June 1990 and ran for 62 issues. This series was initially written and illustrated by Valentino, who'd plotted the series ahead as far as issue #50, but his run was cut short when he co-founded Image Comics. Having taken on two new series and the foundation of a publication company, Valentino asked editor Craig Anderson if he could reduce his duties on the book to just writing, but was fired from the series.

=== Image Comics ===
Valentino left Marvel in 1992 to co-found Image Comics with Whilce Portacio, Erik Larsen, Jim Lee, Rob Liefeld, Todd McFarlane and Marc Silvestri. Valentino originated several projects at Image, which he published through his own Shadowline imprint. Unlike at Marvel, where Valentino worked on characters owned by that company, the original Shadowline titles, like all those of Image, were creator-owned. His first title under the Image banner was the super-hero series ShadowHawk, on which he was both writer and artist. In 1997 he began another series in black and white called A Touch of Silver, a semi-autobiographical book about a young comic book fan coming of age in the 1960s. Also during this time he repackaged most of his earliest autobiographical work into a trade paperback called Vignettes, with an introduction by Dave Sim.

In 1999 he became the publisher of Image Comics. Under his directorship the company diversified its line considerably. The results were mixed. On one hand, Valentino's efforts led to the discovery of a number of talented creators, including Robert Kirkman and Brian Michael Bendis. On the other hand, with the earlier departure of Marc Silvestri's Top Cow line from Image and the 1999 sale of Jim Lee's WildStorm lines to DC Comics, Image Comics saw a drop in overall sales. Still, he was able to turn the company's first profit in nearly a decade by opening new revenue streams such as sales to traditional book stores and libraries. The company managed to maintain its standing as number three in overall market share.

In 2003, Valentino was replaced as publisher of Image Comics by Erik Larsen, another co-founder of the company. Since then Valentino has resurrected Shadowline, his own arm of Image, and has published a revived ShadowHawk series, The Collected normalman, the auto-biographical Drawing From Life and creator owned properties including Bomb Queen, After the Cape and Sam Noir. He also serves on the board of directors of the comic industry charity The Hero Initiative and on its Disbursement Committee. In 2008 Valentino created Silverline Books, an all-ages imprint for original graphic novels.

== Bibliography ==
As writer

=== Marvel Comics ===
- Silver Surfer vol. 3 #32–33 (writer, 1989)
- Savage Sword of Conan (Vol 1) #172 (writer, 1990)
- What If? Vol. 1 #3, 5, 7, #11–12, 25, 30, 41 (writer, 1989–1992)
- Badrock/Wolverine (Vol 1) #1 (writer, 1996)
- Avengers Vol. 2 #1–4 (writer, 1996–1997)

=== Image Comics ===
- After the Cape #1-3
- After the Cape II #1-3
- Bomb Queen III: The Good, The Bad & The Lovely #1-4
- I Hate Gallant Girl #1-3
- Supreme #40

=== Other publishers ===
- Amazing Heroes #29 (Fantagraphics)

As artist

=== Archie Comics ===
- Archie's Weird Mysteries #1, 11
- Knuckles the Echidna #22-24
- Sonic Super Special #7, 10
- Sonic the Hedgehog #80, 103

=== Image Comics ===
- Image United #1–3 (artist, 2009–2010)
- ShadowHawk #1

=== Other publishers ===
- Amazing Heroes #138 (Fantagraphics)
- Champions #39
- The League of Champions #1-2 (Heroic Publishing)
- Who's Who in the Legion of Super-Heroes #1-4, 6

As writer and artist

=== Marvel Comics ===
- Guardians of the Galaxy #1–29, Annual #1–2 (writer and penciler, 1990–1992)

=== Image Comics ===
- Altered Image #1–3 (writer and penciller, 1998)
- A Touch of Silver #1–6 (writer and artist, 1997)
- Drawing from Life #1–2 (writer and artist, 2007)
- ShadowHawk #1–18 (writer and artist, 1992–1996)
- ShadowHawk (vol. 2) #1–15 (writer and artist (#9–15), 2005–2006)
- Shadowhawk II #1-3
- ShadowHawk One-Shot #1 (writer and artist, 2006)
- Supreme #36-39
- The Alliance #1-3 (writer and artist, 1995)
- The Others #0-3 (layouts and writer (#0, 3), 1995)
- The Return of ShadowHawk #1 (writer and artist, 2004)
- Vignettes: The Auto-Biographical Comix of Valentino (1997)
- Youngblood #2, 9

=== Other publishers ===
- Champions #41, 52 (Heroic Publishing)
- normalman #1–12, Annual #1 (writer and artist, 1984–1986)
- normalman 20th Anniversary Special #1 (writer and artist, 2004)
- The League of Champions #4 (Heroic Publishing)

As editor

- Cemetery Blues #1-2
- Green Wake #1-7
- Images of Shadowhawk #1
- Morning Glories #1
- Supreme #31
