= ShadowHawk (character) =

- Jim Valentino, ShadowHawk #3 (December 1992)

Publication information
- Publisher: Image Comics
- First appearance: Youngblood #2 (June 1992)
- Created by: Jim Valentino

In-story information
- Alter ego: Paul Johnstone
- Team affiliations: Brigade
- Abilities: Derived from his armor: Augmented strength and agility; Completely bulletproof

ShadowHawk is a superhero created by Jim Valentino for Image Comics. He was first advertised in the Malibu Sun free promotional magazine in May 1992. His official Image Comics debut was in the second issue of Youngblood series (June 1992), written and illustrated by Rob Liefeld.

Originally, the name ShadowHawk was to be used for the Marvel character Starhawk while he had darkness powers, but Tom DeFalco convinced Valentino to use the name for a new character instead.

== Development ==
Jim Valentino said the impetus behind ShadowHawk was his attempts to look at the elements of Batman that work versus those that do not. He pointed out that Batman being a "creature of the night" who strikes fear into the hearts of criminals was an element that worked, while criticizing Batman's souped-up car and his relationship with Commissioner Gordon. Valentino further criticized Batman's handling of the Joker, stating:

Batman lets the Joker go time and time again, knowing full well that he will kill indiscriminately every time he's let go... He isn't doing his job. That's where the spine breaking came from.

== Paul Johnstone ==
=== Fictional character biography ===
Paul Johnstone grows up as a troubled youth in Harlem, New York City. He avoids a life of crime due in part to the encouragement of a man named Richard Woodroe, who is originally assigned as a caseworker to Paul when he is caught stealing, and eventually marries his mother, becoming his stepfather.

Eventually, Paul became a lawyer and, beyond that, a district attorney. While his life is going so well, his half brother Hojo took his success in college, moved to Wall Street and developed a cocaine addiction. Using Hojo, some gangsters try to leverage Paul into letting their men off, but Paul refuses. Soon after he ends up the target of an assault intended to serve as an example to others who get in the way of these mobsters. This incident culminates in his attackers injecting him with HIV-infected blood.

After the encounter, Johnstone is left uncertain regarding whether he was infected or not. The attack was made public and word of his possible infection spreads through Johnstone's workplace, making it a very inhospitable environment to be in. Tensions between Johnstone and one of his co-workers lead to an altercation between the two which lands Johnstone out of a job and in jail.

After he is released, Paul receives medical confirmation that he is HIV positive and he descends into depression. While walking the streets to clear his head, Paul is threatened by a group of young gang members. He goes berserk and attacks them, leading to his brutal mugging and return to the hospital. During this time he resolves that he will use the rest of his time to dispense justice to the individuals who prey on innocent victims. One of his friends, a cop named Christina Reid (who was kicked off the force that day for use of excessive force), is also in the hospital and comes to visit him. She informs Paul that she and a man named Carlton Sun were developing an exoskeleton suit of armor that can help aid him in accomplishing this task.

Johnstone decides to don the suit, christening himself "ShadowHawk" after his favorite superhero (a name that eventually lures out the psychotic and racist villain Hawk's Shadow, a copycat of ShadowHawk who believes he is the one entitled to bear the mantle of ShadowHawk), and is taught how to fight effectively with the help of Christine, promising to "take back the night". Johnstone also keeps the pills needed to slow his reaction to his HIV infection in small pouches on his belt so he can take them as needed.

Early on, ShadowHawk's actions against criminals are brutal. He catches violent criminals in the act and break their spines, leaving them to be discovered by police with no indication that he attacked them other than hearsay from the criminals and obvious severe injuries. This leads to ShadowHawk garnering a reputation as an urban legend as well as being hunted by both criminals and law enforcement alike. Johnstone also faces various supervillains, including crime-boss Vendetta, her gang the Regulators (Blackjack, Vort-X, Arson, Hardedge and Scandal), the acidic mutant Liquifier, super-powered hitman Dedline and Hawk's Shadow. ShadowHawk also encounters other superheroes such as Spawn and The Savage Dragon. ShadowHawk later becomes a member of the superhero group Brigade.

Later in his career (and as his lifespan shortened due to the progression of HIV to AIDS), Johnstone eventually grows to be less violent. He encounters Trencher and his dispatcher Phoebe; who agrees to assist him in his search for a cure to his infection or another way to extend his life. This leads to encounters with the likes of Youngblood's Chapel (another hero also infected with HIV), Bloodstrike and ShadowHawk team-up with each other in the hopes of finding a cure. He then teams up with the WildC.A.T.s (who offer a possible solution involving a robotic body to transplant Johnstone's consciousness into – which ultimately fails to work). ShadowHawk then visits the Others (Guardd, Klone, Racket, Rebound) in a similar attempt, where they attempt to exorcise the spirit of the virus from his body, which ultimately fails. He is then transported into an encounter with Supreme (in which a battle ensues, leading to the discovery of ShadowHawk's true identity to the world), then encounters Badrock and company in another attempt at changing his body's structure in order to live longer, again leaving in failure, and finally meeting Spawn in his alleyways who, with the help of Trencher and Phoebe, convince him to accept his inevitable death from the virus. One of his few regrets is that he never gets to join a super-group, as in his search for a cure, he realized how useful and fun fighting in a group is.

In his final act as ShadowHawk, Johnstone rescues his mother from being attacked by Hawk's Shadow. The aftermath of the fight leaves Johnstone in a weakened state and unable to elude the pursuit of the police. He is remanded into custody and transported to a hospital, where he dies from AIDS.

== Edward Collins ==
In the wake of Paul Johnstone's death, it was revealed that ShadowHawk is in fact a "Spirit of Justice" and the spirit has inhabited at least four people in the past. Three of the revealed ShadowHawks were human, the last one being a robot. The three human ShadowHawks dealt with villains such as big game huntress Trophy, the toxic mutant Glortch, the mutant crime-boss Joe the Blowfish and the street gang of super-villains the Junkyard Dogz (Hotspur, Rumble Doll, Fast Lucy, Guncrazy and Needle). One of the ShadowHawks included Paul Johnstone's accomplice, Christina Reid. Like Johnstone, the New ShadowHawks become members of Brigade.

After the Spirit of Justice leaves the robot it becomes "Justice", without human feelings and starts to kill people. The saga of the robot ShadowHawk was told in a crossover story called "ShadowHunt", which ran through five Image titles in April 1996. At the end of New Man #4, the robot was destroyed.

ShadowHawk

Publication information
- Publisher: Image Comics under Shadowline
- First appearance: New Man #4 (April 1996)
- Created by: Jim Valentino

In-story information
- Alter ego: Edward "Eddie" J. Collins
- Team affiliations: The Pact
- Abilities: Donning the helmet, the costume morphed around his body, increasing his strength, agility, and stamina.

=== The new ShadowHawk ===
After the robot is destroyed, Eddie Collins, a young high school student, makes his debut as the new ShadowHawk. Having just moved to New York with his recently widowed father James, an electrician, Eddie was walking down a street when the helmet literally fell into his hands. The helmet – called "Nommo" – contains the spirits of all people who were, at one time, inhabited by ShadowHawk, the Spirit of Justice. Eddie Collins tried to meditate with the Nommo on, meeting the spirit of Paul Johnstone, who tells Eddie that he is a reincarnation of a first dynasty Egyptian shaman, how he was the prior ShadowHawk and that Eddie is destined to start anew.

At first Eddie's father orders him to stop, thinking it would kill him. But Eddie is faster, stronger and more agile now and finds new responsibility to the people of New York City. After saving some hostages, Eddie meets Captain Nieves and starts working with him.

=== Jim Valentino's ShadowHawk ===
Blacklight, a 1960s "hippie hero" wakes up from a 30-year coma and learns his wife Dayglo was killed 10 years ago by a villain called Firepower. He is falsely told by a mysterious man that ShadowHawk is the son of Firepower. Blacklight later attacks ShadowHawk and is accidentally killed by him. After killing Blacklight, ShadowHawk faces a mercenary named ZAP. After ZAP is defeated, police propose that Eddie Collins go through the Police Academy to learn the difference between superhero and vigilante. Eddie is attacked by the man who hired ZAP and lied to Blacklight, named Nocturn.

Out on patrol, Nocturn, who knows Eddie Collins is ShadowHawk, attacks him. After a brutal fight, Hawk's Shadow comes out of the shadows to face his "returned" arch-enemy. After being beaten nearly to death, ShadowHawk faces Hawk's Shadow, who wants the helmet that gives ShadowHawk his powers. In the end, Paul Johnstone usurps Eddie's body and beats Hawk's Shadow to near death, but Eddie stops him before the kill.

Soon, Eddie meets the new Blacklight, who is investigating the origin of her new-found powers. The two team-up to bring a vicious monster down. Their target turns out to be the first Blacklight.

Eddie's mentally unstable classmate, Philip Marko discovers he has the power of pyrokinesis. After killing ten people at the high school and his mother, ShadowHawk stops him.

A man-beast named Komodo kills Eddie's best friend, Steven "Skeeve" Evans and defeats ShadowHawk. The helmet, the source of ShadowHawk's power, is taken by Hawk's Shadow, who steps in and kills Komodo. He is soon confronted by his father, the Silver Age ShadowHawk. With the help of the new Blacklight, and Astroman, Eddie goes after Hatfield (Hawk's Shadow) and wins, taking back the helmet.

After hearing the stories of past ShadowHawks, Eddie Collins makes the decision that now he is going to be ShadowHawk on his terms and receives a new costume.

Steven Evans' younger brother blames Shadowhawk for his brothers death and seeks revenge, while Hawk's Shadow's brain is placed in Komodo's body.

== Silver Age ShadowHawk ==
Silver Age ShadowHawk

Publication information
- Publisher: Image Comics
- First appearance: Shadowhawk Special (December 1994)
- Created by: Jim Valentino

In-story information
- Alter ego: Luke Hatfield Sr
- Abilities: No powers, but an excellent hand-to-hand fighter, with access to high-tech equipment.

The Silver Age ShadowHawk is a parody of the Jack Schiff-era Silver Age Batman comics. He works out of the Shadowcave which is in the basement of his house, has a Shadowcar and a Shadowdog. His wife and son are his crimefighting partners, Lady ShadowHawkette and Squirrel. Squirrel went on to become Hawk's Shadow.

The ShadowHawk Special (December 1994) featured two Silver Age ShadowHawk stories. In "The Hyena's Revenge" ShadowHawk and Squirrel hunt the Hyena, a villain based on the Joker. The second was "The Phantom Gorillas from Dimension-Z!" The Silver Age ShadowHawk also appeared with the Silver Age Knight Watchman in Big Bang Comics #2.

The story "Rising" in issue #11 of Jim Valentino's ShadowHawk described Hatfield Sr and his family's final fight against the Hyena and the death of Lady ShadowHawkette.

== ShadowHawk: Resurrection ==
Image Comics published a new ShadowHawk ongoing series following the events of Image United. The series featured Paul Johnstone, the original ShadowHawk, as wearing the helmet once again 15 years after his death. The story was written by Dan Wickline, and the art by Tone Rodriguez and Jim Valentino. The series also featured covers by Erik Larsen and Frank Bravo. Variant covers for ShadowHawk: Resurrection took homage from older issues of ShadowHawk titles and other notable covers throughout comic history. Notably, #3 featured a variant that was styled after the glow-in-the-dark cover for ShadowHawk (1st series) issue #3, while issue #5 featured a variant cover that paid homage to the "Death of Supergirl" cover of Crisis on Infinite Earths #7.

== Bomb Queen VII ==
In Bomb Queen VII: The End of Hope, released from December 2011 to May 2012, after being killed by Rebound 100 years prior, Bomb Queen awakens in a techno-dependent future protected by ShadowHawk, who now inhabits the closest members of the human race to ongoing crimes, regularly switching between bodies. As their battle continues, despite their moral opposition, Bomb Queen gradually begins to fall in love with him.

== Toys ==
Two action figures of ShadowHawk have been released in the past by McFarlane Toys.

In 2009, Shocker Toys released two ShadowHawk figures as part of the first series of its "Indie Spotlight" line.

On May 12, 2026, McFarlane Toys will be soliciting a new ShadowHawk figure as part of their Elite Edition 7" scale line of action figures.

== Video game ==
In April 1994, Valentino stated that a ShadowHawk video game was in development for the Super Nintendo Entertainment System and Sega Genesis, but was asked not to reveal who the developer was at their request.

== TV series ==
=== Live-action ===
In November 1995, it was reported that a live action ShadowHawk television series was in development at Wesley Snipes' production company. Snipes explained that while Shadowhawk was not being developed as a vehicle for him, he did not rule out the possibility of playing a recurring role or guest appearance.

=== Animation ===
In May 1996, it was reported that the USA Network was considering a ShadowHawk animated series produced by Nelvana to possibly air on the network in Autumn of that year. ShadowHawk creator Jim Valentino revealed that he had written a pilot script with Sib Ventress and a series bible. While the ShadowHawk for the series was intended to be Paul Johnstone, the character would not be struggling with AIDS like his comic book counterpart. Wesley Snipes, whose production company was developing the separate live-action TV project, was reportedly in negotiations to provide the voice of Johnstone. In November of that year, it was reported that USA had passed on the ShadowHawk animated series.

== See also ==
- Brigade
- The Pact
- Image United
- Trencher (comics)
