= Image Comics =

American comic book publisher

- Status: Active
- Founded: 1992; 34 years ago
- Founders: Erik Larsen; Jim Lee; Rob Liefeld; Todd McFarlane; Whilce Portacio; Marc Silvestri; Jim Valentino
- Country of origin: United States
- Headquarters location: Portland, Oregon
- Distribution: Lunar Distribution (direct market); Simon & Schuster (books)
- Key people: Todd McFarlane (President); Jim Valentino (Vice President); Marc Silvestri (CEO); Robert Kirkman (COO); Erik Larsen (CFO); Eric Stephenson (Publisher, CCO)
- Publication types: Comic books, graphic novels
- Fiction genres: Superhero; Horror; Fantasy; Science fiction; Action; Adventure; Crime; Comedy
- Imprints: Highbrow Entertainment; ShadowLine; Skybound Entertainment; Todd McFarlane Productions; Top Cow Productions
- Official website: Official website

Image Comics is an American independent comic book publisher and is the third largest direct market comic book and graphic novel publisher in the industry by market share. Its best-known publications include Spawn, The Walking Dead, Kick-Ass, Invincible, Jupiter's Legacy, Witchblade, The Maxx, Savage Dragon, Bitter Root, Descender, Saga, East of West, Monstress, Radiant Black, Firebreather, and Stray Dogs.

It was founded in 1992 by several high-profile illustrators as a venue for creator-owned properties, in which comics creators could publish material of their own creation without giving up the copyrights to those properties. Normally this is not the case in the work-for-hire-dominated American comics industry, where the legal author is a publisher, such as Marvel Comics or DC Comics, and the creator is an employee of that publisher. Its output was originally dominated by superhero and fantasy titles from the studios of the founding Image partners, but now includes comics in many genres by numerous independent creators.

== History ==
=== Founding ===
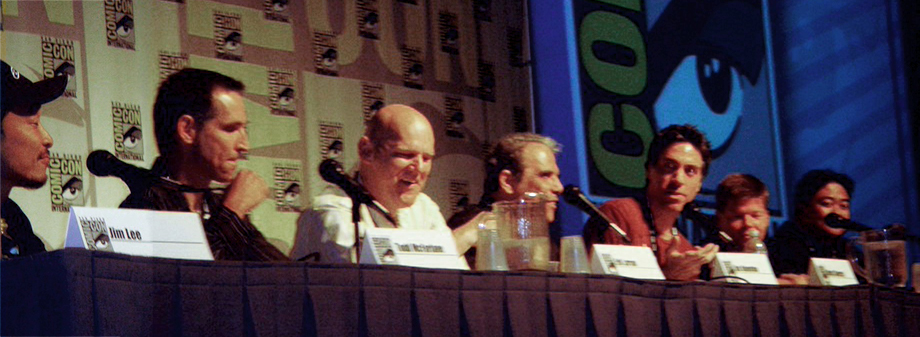
Panel at ComicCon 2007 on the 15th anniversary of the founding of Image Comics. From left: Jim Lee, Todd McFarlane, Erik Larsen, Jim Valentino, Marc Silvestri, Rob Liefeld and Whilce Portacio

In the early 1990s, artists Todd McFarlane, Rob Liefeld, and Jim Lee broke successive modern sales records at Marvel Comics with Spider-Man #1, X-Force #1, and X-Men #1 respectively. However, the creators became discontented. Liefeld worried that their success actually made their positions at Marvel precarious. "We had become too big for the system," he said in 2000. "Marvel didn't want a star system." McFarlane and Lee, on the other hand, felt undervalued at Marvel, where they were not paid when their art was reused for merchandise such as t-shirts.

Malibu Comics agreed to publish a creator-owned title by Liefeld in 1991. In July that year he announced plans to publish an independent comic called Youngblood and in September advertised a title called The Executioners to be published by "Image Comics." Although Liefeld shelved plans for The Executioners after Marvel threatened to both sue him and fire him from X-Force (the characters later appeared in Youngblood and their own title as "The Berzerkers"), the incident only further motivated him to pursue independent publishing.

Liefeld soon invited Amazing Spider-Man artist Erik Larsen, Guardians of the Galaxy artist Jim Valentino, and McFarlane to join Image Comics. McFarlane then recruited Jim Lee at the Sotheby's auction in New York in December 1991. Wolverine artist Marc Silvestri, who was also in town for the event, was also invited. Lee invited Uncanny X-Men artist Whilce Portacio shortly after. These seven creators became the original founding partners of Image Comics.

Image's organizing charter had two key provisions:

- Image would not own any creator's work; the creator would. Image itself would own no intellectual property except the company trademarks: its name and its logo.
- No Image partner would interfere—creatively or financially—with any other partner's work.

=== Early years ===
The founders' initial titles were produced under the Image name, but published through Malibu Comics, which provided administrative, production, distribution and marketing support.

The first Image comic published was Liefeld's Youngblood #1 in April 1992. Pre-orders for the book reached 930,000 copies, beating the previous record for both the top selling creator-owned comic and top selling independent comic of all time. The second Image title, McFarlane's Spawn #1, debuted with a print run of 1.7 million copies in May 1992. Larsen's The Savage Dragon, Lee's WildC.A.T.S, Valentino's ShadowHawk, and Silvestri's CyberForce followed, all with strong sales to comic shops.

Within a few months, Malibu had almost 10% of the North American comics market share thanks to Image, briefly exceeding that of industry giant DC Comics. In early 1993 Image left Malibu and established itself as an independent company, hiring Tony Lobito as full-time publisher. Image became the first publishing company to challenge Marvel and DC's dominance since the establishment of the direct market.

Portacio was the only founder not to deliver the first issue of his own series in 1992. Initially, Portacio was reported to be working on a title called Huntsman with Chris Claremont, but opted instead to create his own title called Wetworks (the Huntsman character later appeared in issues of WildC.A.T.S and CyberForce written by Claremont). However, work on the series was significantly delayed due to the death of Portacio's sister and he decided to resign as an Image partner. In 2022, former Incredible Hulk artist Dale Keown said that he was approached in 1992 about taking Portacio's place, but declined because his criminal record made it difficult to travel outside his home country of Canada. Keown still became the first non-founder to publish a creator-owned title with Image. The first issue of his series Pitt sold more than one million copies to comic shops. It was originally scheduled for November 1992 but shipped several months late.

Image continued to expand in 1993 with new titles from both founders, such as Liefeld's Bloodstrike and Lee's StormWatch, and non-founders, including Sam Kieth's The Maxx, Larry Stroman's Tribe, Keith Giffen's Trencher, and Mike Grell's Shaman's Tears, and 1963 by Alan Moore, Steve Bissette, and Rick Veitch. Tribe became the largest-selling African-American-created comic, with more than one million copies sold to comic shops. Moore went on to work on several Image series, including Spawn, WildC.A.T.S, The Maxx, and Supreme.

Also in 1993, Image and Valiant Comics began publishing the inter-company crossover Deathmate, which comics historian Jason Sacks described as the first major comic universe crossover since the Marvel/DC crossover The Uncanny X-Men and The New Teen Titans was published in 1982.

Some of the founders' studios came to resemble separate publishers, each with several ongoing series set in a shared universe. The use of freelancers to write or illustrate series that were owned by the Image partners led to criticism that some of them had reproduced the very system they had rebelled against, but with them in charge instead of a corporation.

Many Image series quickly fell behind their intended publishing schedule (See "Speculative bubble burst" below). In response, retailers cut orders to reduce their risk. In August 1993, Image cut back its line, citing lateness and a desire to focus on books by the founders. The company announced it had canceled Shaman's Tears, Stupid, Trencher, and Tribe and that several mini-series including 1963 and Pitt would not become ongoing series. Moore's Enemies of Mankind and Frank Miller's Big Guy were "indefinitely postponed."

In late 1993, Image hired Larry Marder, an independent cartoonist and former marketer for Chicago comics retail chain Moondog, to act as "executive director" for the publisher, ranking above Lobito and reporting directly to the partners. McFarlane told The Comics Journal that the founders had ignored Lobito's advice in the past, even when he was correct, because they didn't have confidence in his guidance due to his age and relative inexperience.

Despite the scaleback in 1993, Image continued to publish creator-owned comics by a variety of creators. Though many Image titles sold more than 500,000 copies per issue in 1992 and 1993, by mid-1994 only the top-selling titles reached 250,000 in sales. Marder determined that Image needed to publish at least 30 comic books per month to stay in business. "And if the partners did not provide those books, I had to get those books wherever I could find them," Marder explained in 2007. Titles added in the mid-1990s included Hellshock by Jae Lee, Groo by Sergio Aragonés, Bone by Jeff Smith, A Distant Soil by Colleen Doran, and Astro City by Kurt Busiek, Brent Anderson and Alex Ross. In 1996, Lee founded a new sub-imprint called Homage Comics under his WildStorm Studios label. Described as a "home for creator-owned material as well as a safe haven from an increasingly challenging comic book market," the initial line-up consisted of Astro City, Terry Moore's previously self-published Strangers in Paradise, and a new title called Leave it to Chance by James Robinson and Paul Smith.

The Image founders also continued to produce new top-selling series, such as Gen^{13} from WildStorm Studios in 1994, and Witchblade and The Darkness from Silvestri's Top Cow Productions in 1995 and 1996 respectively. In 1998, WildStorm launched the commercially successful Cliffhanger sub-imprint to showcase creator-owned titles from a new generation of popular artists, starting with Humberto Ramos, J. Scott Campbell, and Joe Madureira.

=== Speculative bubble burst ===
After a peak in early 1993, the comics market experienced a steep downturn as the speculative bubble burst. Around 20% of all comic book stores went out of business in 1993, industry analyst Mel Thompson estimated, compared to the typical attrition rate of around 10% in prior years. Many comics industry professionals blamed speculators for the market downturn, but many retailers cited Image's erratic publishing record as a key cause of fiscal strain for stores.

Every single Image comic scheduled to ship in the first quarter of 1993 shipped late. In April 1993, only 15.3% of the company's titles shipped on time, compared with 90.1% shipped on time by DC, 79.2% by Marvel, and 100% by Valiant. Some titles ended up shipping out of sequence. For example, the first issue of Liefeld's ongoing Brigade series shipped before the concluding issue of the Brigade limited series, and Spawn #21 shipped before issues #19 and #20. Deathmate Red, Liefeld's portion of the inter-company crossover with Valiant Comics, became emblematic of Image's problems. The book shipped four months late, well after the release of the series epilogue.

Retailers typically order comics two months in advance, on a non-returnable basis. Late books create cash flow issues for retailers, and in many cases, fans lost interest in late books by the time they shipped. Retailers estimated that late shipping could affect sales by as much as 60%, according to The Comics Journal. Late books also make it harder for retailers to plan purchases, because they have to order the next issues in a series before they see how well the earlier issues sold. "When books start shipping late, you end up ordering four, five, six issues before you see sales, and that's where the greater danger is," Hanley's Universe owner Jim Hanley told The Comics Journal in 1994.

Todd McFarlane told The Comics Journal that the blame for the market collapse should not be pinned entirely on Image. He argued that the company shared responsibility with other publishers, distributors, and retailers alike, saying that Image shipping books on time wouldn't "stop retailers from being stupid." In a Comics Retailer interview, McFarlane blamed the industry downturn on greed, saying he hoped that retailers who over-ordered popular titles, including Spawn, went bankrupt.

Based on public orders and shipping data, The Comics Journal and Thompson concluded that because Image titles accounted for such a large percentage of both late books and dollars spent, the company was more culpable for the situation than the Image partners were willing to admit.

In 2007, comics journalist George Khoury wrote that Marvel's decision to distribute its product exclusively through its own distribution subsidiary beginning in 1995 had a bigger long-term impact on the comics industry than Image's business practices. Diamond Distributors founder Steve Geppi told Khoury that Image helped expand the market for comic books, and Mile High Comics proprietor Chuck Rozanski pointed to the return of Superman less than six months after the Death of Superman, as the moment the speculative bubble burst. Khoury concluded that everyone in the industry was to blame for the comics market crash, including publishers, speculators, readers, retailers, creators, and editors.

"Many consider Deathmate the comic book that singlehandedly put an end to the industry's prosperous times and the biggest reason why so many comic book stores closed its doors for good," comics historian Jason Sacks wrote in 2018. "In truth, there was plenty of blame to go around."

=== Partial break-up ===
There were tensions between the Image Comics founders from the very beginning, according to Liefeld, as the founders competed with each other for sales and talent. Liefeld founded his own separate company, Maximum Press, in late 1994 largely in response to those tensions and a realization that he wouldn't always be a part of Image, he told CBR in 2001. At the time Maximum Press was announced, he had described it as an imprint for non-superhero titles, such as the science fantasy Warchild.

Liefeld proposed a merger between his Extreme Studios imprint and Silvestri's Top Cow imprint in 1996, according to Matt Hawkins, who worked for Liefeld's studios from 1993 until 1998 and has been president of Silvestri's Top Cow Productions since 1998. Hawkins said that when Liefeld realized that Silvestri was going to reject his offer, he decided instead to try to recruit some of Top Cow's artists, including Witchblade artist Mike Turner. At one point Hawkins called Turner about working on an Avengelyne project for Maximum Press, but Silvestri took the phone and yelled at Hawkins.

Meanwhile, Liefeld moved some of his titles from Image Comics to Maximum Press, escalating tensions within the company. In the summer of 1996, shortly after the incident with Turner and Hawkins, Silvestri announced that he would leave Image Comics, citing irreconcilable differences with a then-unnamed Image partner.

Liefeld resigned from Image Comics in September 1996 shortly before a vote to force him out of the company. Silvestri reversed his plans to leave Image shortly after.

Liefeld filed suit against Image in 1996 for wrongful termination and breach of contract for money he claimed was owed to him. Image countersued, claiming Liefeld had misused Image funds and staff resources for his Maximum Press titles and failed to repay an overpayment made by the company. The suits were settled in February 1997. Terms of the settlement were not disclosed, but Marder and Valentino claimed Liefeld repaid the company the money he owed.

Liefeld later reconciled with the Image partners and returned to the company as a creator, as opposed to a partner, in 2007.

Jim Lee sold WildStorm and its characters to DC Comics in 1998, citing a desire to exchange his responsibilities as a publisher for the opportunity to do more creative work.

=== Diversification ===
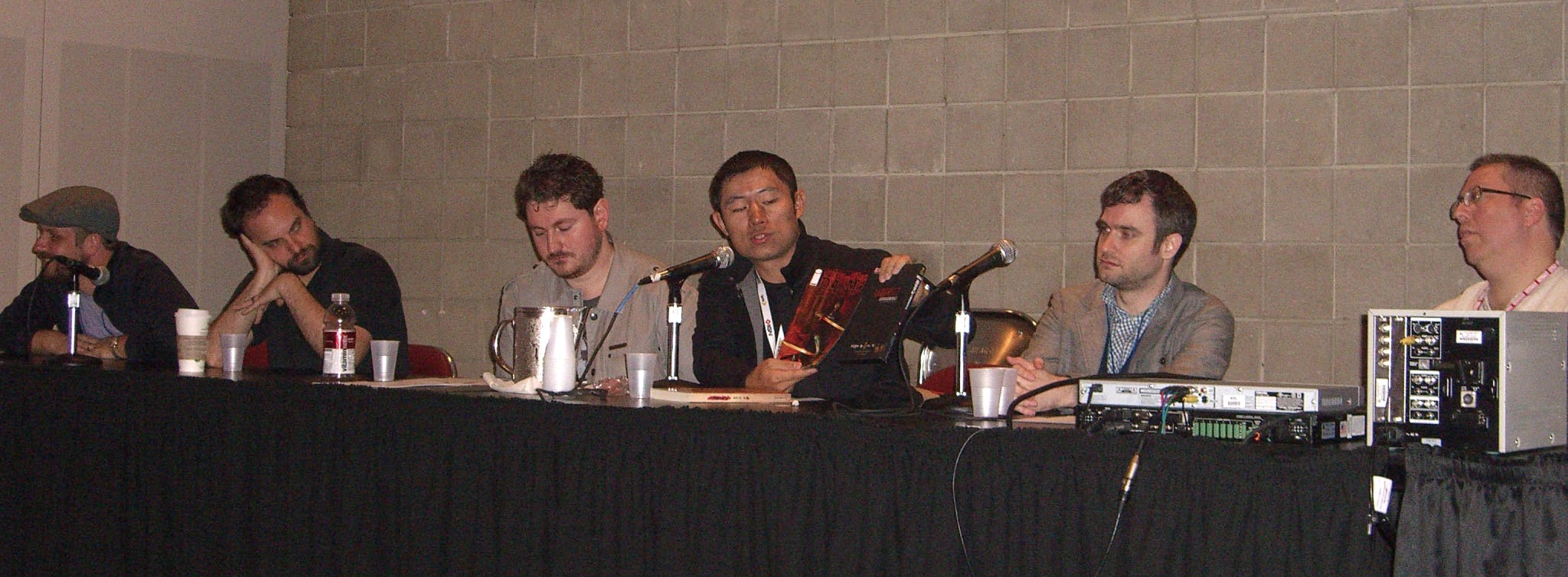
A panel of non-founding Image creators at the 2010 New York Comic Con (l–r): Tomm Coker, Tim Seeley, Ben McCool, James Zhang, Nick Spencer and Ron Marz

Image continued to branch out, adding titles such as Brian Michael Bendis's Jinx and Matt Wagner's Mage to the company's line-up in 1997, while Valentino's Shadowline imprint published more than 12 black-and-white titles, including his own A Touch of Silver, James A. Owen's Starchild, Zander Cannon's The Replacement God, Mike Baron's The Badger, and Michael Avon Oeming's Ship of Fools. Creators paid a flat fee of $2,000 to Image and $500 to Shadowline for administrative costs and kept all other proceeds from their sales, as well as all intellectual property rights.

After Marder left Image in 1999 to help run McFarlane Toys, Valentino was named the company's publisher. He later said he saw his time as publisher as an extension of what he had been doing with Shadowline. He is often credited for making Image Comics into the diverse publisher that it is seen as today. Sacks wrote that by the end of 1999, Image had bolstered its reputation "as the place to find the highest quality creator-owned material."

In the early 2000s, a number of imprints not owned by the Image partners began publishing licensed material through Image. Devil's Due launched a new G.I. Joe series via Image in 2001, MVCreations launched a new Masters of the Universe series in 2002, Udon Entertainment began publishing a series based on the Street Fighter video game franchise in 2003, and the imprint DB Productions began publishing an adaptation of George R. R. Martin's The Hedge Knight, also in 2003.

Image Comics hired Eric Stephenson, who had worked as an editor and writer for Liefeld's Extreme Studios in the early days of Image, as marketing director in 2002. In 2003, Image published Robert Kirkman and Tony Moore's zombie comic The Walking Dead, which went on to become one of the top-selling comics on the market. Valentino originally rejected the title, fearing the premise was too familiar. Kirkman lied and said he planned to reveal that aliens were behind the zombies, a premise Stephenson found interesting enough to encourage Valentino to accept. Kirkman later admitted that he never planned to include aliens in the comic.

Other titles published during Valentino's tenure include Kirkman and Cory Walker's Invincible; Bendis's Powers; Garth Ennis, Jimmy Palmiotti, and Amanda Conner's The Pro; Jay Faerber's Noble Causes, and Warren Ellis and Chris Weston's Ministry of Space.

Image's market share declined in the mid-2000s as the imprints Devil's Due, Dreamwave Productions, MVCreations, Udon Entertainment, and DB Productions departed the company and Dark Horse Comics surpassed Image to become the third largest comic book publisher. Larsen took over as publisher in 2004, intending to publish more mainstream comics. Valentino returned to running the Shadowline imprint. Titles launched during Larsen's tenure include Ellis and Ben Templesmith's Fell; Casey and Tom Scioli's Godland; Richard Starkings's Elephantmen; Kieron Gillen and Jamie McKelvie's Phonogram; and The Sword by the Luna Brothers.

In 2007, Liefeld returned to Image as a creator, as opposed to a partner, to publish a new Youngblood series written by Joe Casey with art by Derec Donovan and Val Staples. Liefeld credited Kirkman for bringing him back to Image.

Larsen stepped down as publisher to focus more on The Savage Dragon in July 2008 and Stephenson was promoted to the position.

=== Eric Stephenson era ===
In 2008, shortly after Stephenson's appointment, Image added Kirkman as the company's first new partner since its founding. Stephenson cited Kirkman's commitment to publishing through Image and his strong vision as reasons for the decision. In 2010, Kirkman founded his own imprint called Skybound.

Under Stephenson, Image began to greatly expand both the types of comics it publishes and the types of creators drawn to the publisher, beginning a period of critical acclaim. An influx of Marvel- and DC-associated creators began publishing creator-owned work with them. The Beat named Stephenson the Comics Industry Person of the Year in 2012 for what editor-in-chief Heidi MacDonald described as Stephenson's "creative revitalization" of Image. MacDonald cited the publication of Saga and other new titles from popular creators like Grant Morrison, Jonathan Hickman and Ed Brubaker, along with "homegrown hits" from Image like Chew, Morning Glories, and Thief of Thieves and Stephenson's own Nowhere Men among his accomplishments. Saga creator Brian K. Vaughan explained that while he loved the other companies he had worked with, he wanted to maintain 100% control over the series to ensure there would be no content restrictions or interference and Image may have been the only publisher that still offered a fully creator-owned contract.

Image's sales grew significantly during this period to a market share of around 10% in 2015. Image was voted Diamond Comic Distributors' Publisher of the Year three years in a row between 2013 and 2015. By the company's 25th anniversary in 2017, the majority of titles Image published in a given month were not affiliated with the founding partners. Meanwhile, McFarlane's Spawn and related titles, his McFarlane Toys line, Silvestri's Top Cow imprint and Kirkman's various series remained a substantial segment of Image's total sales. As of 2020, McFarlane's Spawn and Larsen's Savage Dragon were the longest-running creator-owned titles published by Image, with over 300 and 250 issues, respectively.

The company's headquarters moved from Berkeley, California to Portland, Oregon in 2017. The following year, Stephenson became an Image partner, board member, and chief creative officer. Prior to Berkeley, its headquarters were located first in Anaheim, California and then in Oakland, California.

=== Staff unionization ===
In November 2021, members of the editorial, production, sales and accounting staff formed Comic Book Workers United (CBWU), a trade union affiliated with the Communications Workers of America. The union published nine goals, including salary and workload transparency, improving staff morale, and improving career mobility. Image did not voluntarily recognize the union.

The unionization drive was met with praise from many industry professionals. However, the union's ninth goal of establishing "a collective voting option to immediately cancel publication of any title whose creator(s) have been found to have engaged in abuse, sexual assault, racism and xenophobia, homophobia, transphobia, anti-Semitism, Islamophobia, ableism, etc.” proved controversial. Vice reported that this goal was "read as a demand for a censorious panel to ensure that upcoming comics adhere to diktats of political correctness." CBWU told Vice that the request was not an effort to dictate the content of Image publications, but to create a process to ensure a safe working environment.

The union was certified by a vote in January 2022, becoming the first of its kind in the American comics industry. Prior to the vote, most Image comics, apart from those published by Todd McFarlane Studios, included the names of Image staffers in the credits. After the vote, those names were removed from titles published under Valentino's Shadowline imprint. CBWU filed suit against Image Comics in February 2022, alleging retaliation against union members and interference with bargaining efforts.

CBWU ratified their first union contract with Image Comics in March 2023. The union filed an additional lawsuit against Image Comics in May 2023, alleging further "anti-union discrimination."

== List of imprints ==
This list also includes studios and partners. Image considers these studios as separate publishing companies that operate in concert with Image and each studio as fully autonomous from Image Central.

=== Current ===
- 12-Gauge Comics
- Arancia Studio
- Black Market Narrative
- Giant Generator
- Ghost Machine
- Highbrow Entertainment
- Robert Kirkman, LLC
  - Skybound Entertainment
  - Skybound Games
    - Howyaknow, LLC
- Todd McFarlane Productions
  - McFarlane Toys
- Top Cow Productions
- Shadowline
- Syzygy Publishing

=== Former ===
- Devil's Due Publishing
- Dreamwave Productions
- Extreme Studios
- Gorilla Comics
- Millarworld
- WildStorm
  - America's Best Comics

== Accolades ==
In July 2018, Marjorie Liu won the Eisner Award for Best Writer for her work on Monstress, making her the first woman in history to win in the category.

In April 2019, Image Comics titles received a total of 30 Eisner Award nominations—more than any other nominated publisher—and made history as the first publisher to sweep the Best New Series category, with all six titles nominated published by Image.

== See also ==
- Energon Universe
- Image Universe
- Massive-Verse
- List of Image Comics publications
- List of unproduced Image Comics projects
- List of television series and films based on Image Comics publications
