= Horridus =

Publication information
- Publisher: Image Comics; IDW Publishing
- First appearance: The Savage Dragon #4 (August 1993)
- Created by: Erik Larsen

In-story information
- Alter ego: Sarah Hill
- Team affiliations: Special Operations Strikeforce; Chicago Police Department; Freak Force
- Abilities: Her body thorns and teeth can cause much damage. Bulletproof, less so on palms and stomach. Superhuman agility, strength and senses.

Horridus, born Sarah Hill, is a superheroine created by Erik Larsen for his Image Comics series, The Savage Dragon, as a member of the Freak Force.

== Fictional character biography ==
Meggan Tully, while dating George Hill, is abducted by aliens and impregnated. The event is removed from her memory and she is returned to her car. George believes the child is his and marries Meggan.

When the unusually shaped child is born, Meggan and George chain her up in the basement, with only a television set for company. They believe the child to be a punishment for their pre-marital sex.

After years of guilt and suffering, George and Meggan Hill commit suicide and Sarah is found by the paper delivery boy. The local police are afraid to enter the basement and call in an officer – called Dragon – from the Chicago Police Department, who releases Horridus and takes her to his station house.

=== Freak Force ===
CPD's Captain James Stewart is extremely enthusiastic about assembling a superhuman strikeforce for his department and recruits Sarah Hill, giving her the codename Horridus, to his "Freak Force" program. There, she meets Dragon, Rapture, Barbaric and Ricochet who at the time is too young to join the department. Due to restrictions imposed by the local government and their police superiors, the 'freak' officers quit the police force and become bounty hunters, allying themselves with the veteran hero Superpatriot and the new Mighty Man.

Freak Force fights a number of menaces, ranging from the supervillains such as the Fantastical Force, the Covenant of the Sword, the Throwaways, Master Atom, Bludgeon, their own evil clones and the Frightening Force, the extraterrestrial Martians, Matrix Swarm and Cosmic Cops, and other heroes like Badrock, the WildC.A.T.S. and Cyberforce.

They even fight their own government; at one point Horridus assists in taking down a secret prison for super types.

Eventually, Horridus and most of her teammates join the United States government's new superteam to replace Youngblood – presumed dead from the Martian attack - the Special Operations Strikeforce. Horridus gains more worldly and fighting experience.

For a time, Horridus lives with Rapture. However, Horridus still hasn't come to terms with the fact she is very sharp; at one point she destroys Rapture's waterbed, after which Horridus briefly meets the Teenage Mutant Ninja Turtles, whom she considers cute. The character briefly appeared in the Turtles' series, developing a brief relationship with Michelangelo.

Her living situation changes after Rapture's death on an off-world mission. At one point she lives with Dragon, developing an attraction for him. Unfortunately, as a consequence to her isolated background and lack of proper social skills, she does not know how to handle it and ends up inappropriately touching him in the middle of the night, causing a good deal of drama.

As a bridesmaid, Horridus attends the wedding of Dragon and her superhero friend, Jennifer Murphy. It is interrupted by the seeming murder of Jennifer by the armored Overlord. However, Jennifer had been replaced by a double. Horridus then serves as a nanny to Angel when Dragon is out fighting crime. According to Hawkins she was also being trained by Sgt Marvel to fight better.

Horridus suffers another loss when Chelsea Nirvana, Freak Force's old nemesis, murders Ann Stevens and steals the Mighty Man powers. Chelsea dies of misuse of the MM form, which passes to Dart.

Horridus gains a position with the Chicago branch of the Special Operations Strikeforce. However, like the rest of the city, it is owned outright by the criminal society, the Vicious Circle.

Horridus died of COVID-19 after "refusing" to get vaccinated (in actuality having been unable to get vaccinated due to the toughness of her skin), with the attending physician lamenting, "Superheroes are supposed to die saving the world--not from some virus."

=== Alternate Horridus ===
After issue #75 of the Savage Dragon series, an alternate version of Earth was introduced into that universe. In this one, Freak Force had never fully formed, though Horridus did spend some time employed by the Chicago Police Department. Twenty-eight issues later, in #103, the original Earth is destroyed, killing virtually all of its inhabitants, including that universe's version of Horridus.

A 'savage world' Horridus does exist where she is held captive in Brainiape's arena. She rescued along with others. She goes with Dragon to try to rescue Dart from Mako and witnesses Dart's death first hand. She's part of a superhuman army put together by Super Patriot to try to stop Mighty Man who at this point was Billy Berman and was shown defeated in the background.

This Horridus is shown tossed into Dimension X along with the genius Rex by an evil version of the Dragon.

== See also ==
- Freak Force
