= Jennifer Dragon =

Publication information
- Publisher: Image Comics
- First appearance: The Savage Dragon: Sex & Violence #1 (August 1997)
- Created by: Erik Larsen

In-story information
- Alter ego: Jennifer Dragon (née Murphy)
- Team affiliations: Liberty League
- Notable aliases: Smasher
- Abilities: Currently depowered, formerly super strong and invulnerable.

Jennifer Dragon, originally Jennifer Murphy and sometimes using the codename Smasher, is a recurring comic book character in Erik Larsen's Savage Dragon and Robert Kirkman's Invincible. The wife of the Savage Dragon and mother of Angel and Malcolm Dragon, she debuted in the first issue of The Savage Dragon: Sex & Violence mini-series, though she had a one-panel cameo prior to that in Savage Dragon issue 40.

== Fictional character biography ==
=== Before The Savage Dragon ===
The Savage Dragon characters appeared in two series prior to Image Comics' founding, but neither are canon to the current Savage Dragon series. In Graphic Fantasy, a self-published title by Larsen and two friends, The Dragon was a widower, with his wife Liz being shown in flashback in both issues. Liz looked almost identical to Jennifer and was killed in the same way. A similar character appeared in Megaton, again being identical in looks and possessing the same powers as Jennifer. The character also had a baby girl. In the letter column of Savage Dragon #37 Erik Larsen confirmed that these characters were Jennifer, albeit with different names, in response to a rumor about a new love interest appearing in an upcoming Savage Dragon annual. (The annual became the Sex and Violence mini-series.)

=== Original Jennifer Murphy ===
Prior to issue 75 of The Savage Dragon, stories were set on a different Earth to the ones they are now and with few exceptions all of the characters featured in the series today are not those that appeared in the series prior to that issue, including Jennifer Murphy.

Jennifer had married her high school sweetheart Kevin Murphy after they graduated and had a baby girl called Angel. Kevin was abusive and their marriage was unhappy. One night Jennifer strikes Kevin to defend Angel causing his head to explode due to the mutant powers she had developed. The Dragon responded to the domestic violence call, meeting Jennifer. Jennifer found herself framed for a series of vicious murders taking place. The Dragon clears her name by apprehending the real killer, a disgruntled stripper.

At this time, Rob Liefeld departed Image Comics and the Mars Attacks Image and Shattered Image events were used to phase out his characters from the collective 'Image Universe' including Youngblood. In The Savage Dragon, Erik Larsen has the US Government proposition him about making a replacement team for Youngblood which he eventually forms from most of the series' super-powered/costumed support cast and names "Special Operations Strikeforce" (S.O.S). Jennifer is one of the characters who accepts a position, codenamed 'Smasher' and quickly ascends the ranks of the team to Level One.

Jennifer is one of the S.O.S members sent to Darkworld to stop its despot ruler Darklord from swapping his dying planet (later revealed as another Earth) with the S.O.S's. She was separated from the group along with Dragon after attacking Darklord and the two did not take part in the dictator's defeat. Stuck on a dying planet, they were able to escape using a Martian space ship that was at the bottom of that world's Lake Michigan and the two spent months lost in space along with the Darkworld version of The Dragon's old girlfriend Debbie Harris eventually crashing on Godworld, where the offspring of the various Gods and Deities of mythology had been banished. There Thor wanted to take Jennifer for his own. During the ensuing battle between Thor, Hercules and The Dragon, Jennifer was knocked unconscious. Eventually All-God (an all powerful 'god of gods') intervenes to send Jennifer and Dragon home where she is reunited with her daughter. Shortly after The Dragon appears to die in battle.

Dragon had in fact been bonded with Detective William Johnson. Jennifer is present when Dragon is fully resurrected during a battle with the sorcerer Abnver Cadavar. The two finally begin to date eventually moving in together in Chicago. Dragon is unhappy with her decision to join the Chicago branch of the S.O.S he proposes and Jennifer accepts however before the wedding, an underground organization The Covenant of the Sword kidnap Jennifer and the villain Imposter takes her place. At the wedding, Imposter is killed by the new Overlord, who is completely unaware of the impersonator. The Dragon was also unaware of the switch, and believes Jennifer to be dead.

While in the Covenant's possession Jennifer is brainwashed. By the time The Dragon and Dart, now Mighty Man, attack the organization she is totally under their control. Jennifer defeats her former lover as part of the lead up to the switch in Earths. She was freed from the Covenant's control. Years later she is still working for the S.O.S and is in a relationship with Hercules was stranded on Earth. This Jennifer is killed when Universo (a pastiche of Marvel villain Galactus) destroyed the Earth from the first 75 issues. Her daughter Angel survived and was rescued by She-Dragon from Dimension X, where she fell shortly before the Earth was destroyed.

=== Second Jennifer Murphy ===
When Dragon killed the time traveler Damian Darklord he created a parallel Earth where Darklord's meddling never happened. During the creation, Dragon became stuck in this Earth, which is the current setting for the savage Dragon series. Jennifer's life on this Earth was much the same as it had on the previous Earth. She had been in a solid relationship with The Dragon of that Earth but instead of being replaced by the Covenant of The Sword (who never existed as they were formed by Damian Darklord), she left the Dragon and Chicago after constant attacks on him by Super Villains and old enemies made her fear for Angel's safety. After Dragon arrived on the new earth, he discovered his family home had been destroyed and he believed Jennifer was dead. After The Dragon overthrows Sebastian Khan (known on the previous Earth as Cyberface), Jennifer returns.

The Dragon tells Jennifer the truth about their situation with the new Earth. The couple overcome their difficulties and marry. They settle in Chicago, with both being active members of The Liberty League, which also includes Superpatriot and Mighty Man. Dragon and Jennifer experience many adventures, with Angel often tagging along against her mother's wishes.

Dragon accidentally brings back the alien criminal Ba-Goom from Dimension X. Jennifer is instantly skeptical and wary of the alien. Ba-Goom becomes her daughter's 'pet' and is named Mr. Glum. Glum is constantly trying to kill The Dragon or take over the world, though his plans always come to naught often with comical results. The Dragon thinks he's harmless and mischievous and dismisses his wife's worries about him. Jennifer is eventually proved right when Ba-Goom comes into possession of the God Gun and takes over the planet with Angel at his side.

Jennifer is currently missing after being rendered powerless during a battle with Negate. She was badly injured and hospitalized after an experiment of Glum's caused Angel to grow to gigantic proportions and destroy Jennifer and Dragon's house. Jennifer was furious with the Dragon for not listening to her about Mr. Glum. She disappeared from hospital during the months Dragon and Vanguard spent trying to overthrow Glum.

== Powers ==
Jennifer is currently a normal human in peak physical condition. Before losing her powers she had super strength, enough to cause a man's head to explode on impact with the force of the punch. She was also very durable, though not invulnerable as she has been seen to bleed in combat with powerful adversaries.
