= Covenant of the Sword =

Fictional organization

Covenant of the Sword is a fictional, covert organization bent on global domination appearing in comic books published by Image Universe. It was created by Erik Larsen, Keith Giffen and Dave Johnson, and first appeared in SuperPatriot #1 (July 1993). Although mainly appearing in Larsen's flagship title The Savage Dragon and the related title SuperPatriot, the Covenant also appeared in a number of Extreme Studios comics by Rob Liefeld, most notably Bloodstrike and Badrock. Damien Darklord is one of the members who is also a major villain in the Savage Dragon series.

== Fictional team history ==
The Covenant of the Sword is an organization shrouded in mystery but whose sole purpose is to secretly take over the world. Members dress in medieval garb reminiscent of the Knights Templar and employ an army of robotic and cybernetic soldiers.

When the Savage Dragon's unborn child kicked its mother, Rapture, the baby, who had inherited its father's super strength, caused internal damage, forcing Rapture to go into premature labor. By the time the Dragon arrived on the scene, the baby had been delivered and, apparently, died. In reality, however, the baby had been stolen by the Covenant of the Sword and replaced by a drone to fool its parents, leaving the Covenant free to use the Dragon's powerful child for its own nefarious ends.

The Covenant of the Sword also attempted to infiltrate Project: Born Again, a controversial government agency that resurrected dead heroes as agents, by successfully having one of their members, Leonard Noble, placed in charge of both the project and the Bloodstike team. Noble's true loyalties were eventually uncovered but not before the entire Bloodstrike team had been destroyed aside for its leader, Cabbot Stone, who had been remade into a mindless soldier. Noble was killed when his membership in the Covenant was revealed.

Cabbot Stone, now known simply as Bloodstrike, was sent to rescue a U.S. senator who had been abducted by the Covenant. The attempt was successful but Stone ended up executing the senator for being a member of a rival secret society, the Brotherhood of Man.

On two separate occasions, the Covenant of the Sword abducted the mother of Youngblood member, Badrock. In both instances, Badrock teamed up with Grifter of the Wildcats (an old flame of Angela McCall) to rescue her.

They were founded by Damien Darklord the grandson of Superpatriot.

== Members ==
=== Damien Darklord ===
Damien Darklord is the hybrid Grandson of Superpatriot and the third main villain of the Savage Dragon comics.

=== Flux ===
A shape-shifting member

=== Hive ===
A member who can break down into miniature versions of himself

=== Manga ===
A woman who can separate parts of her body.
