= Freak Force =

Fictional superhero team

- Cover to Freak Force #1, December 1993. Pencils by Vic Bridges, inks by Karl Kesel.

Publication information
- Publisher: Image Comics
- First appearance: The Savage Dragon #4 (September 1993)
- Created by: Erik Larsen

In-story information
- Member(s): Horridus; Rapture; Barbaric; Dart; Superpatriot; Ricochet; Mighty Man; Star

Freak Force is the name of a fictional team of superhuman bounty hunters operating out of Chicago, Illinois. They originated in the Image Comics comic book series Savage Dragon, but subsequently went on to star in their own series. All the characters were created by Erik Larsen, many during his adolescence.

== Premise ==
With the exceptions of Superpatriot and Mighty Man, all of the team were part of a failed "freak force" program, in which the Chicago Police Department attempted to recruit super-powered police officers. Dart, a vigilante from Detroit, was among the first recruited. Horridus joined soon after the Dragon rescued her from abusive captivity in her parents' basement. Ricochet and Barbaric were led to the program from a meeting with the Savage Dragon, although Ricochet was rejected as too young to be a police officer. While sulking, she helped rescue Rapture from a homicidal pimp.

Their tenure as police officers was brief and fraught with disaster. Barbaric almost killed members of the Vicious Circle criminal organization during a prison escape. Dart gravely injured the villain Cesspool, who later filed a lawsuit. The police department also wanted the crew to wear standard police uniforms, instead of superhero costumes. The heroes complained that this would restrict their fighting ability. This, and other factors, soon led to the team leaving the police department.

== The series ==
In addition to The Savage Dragon, Highbrow Entertainment turned out the initial spin-off series Freak Force on a regular basis. The series ran for 18 issues, from December 1993 to July 1995. It was written by Erik Larsen, Keith Giffen and pencilled by Vic Bridges.

Issues #1 mostly set the scene and introduced the team's downtown headquarters as well as a shambolic fight against a nuclear-powered character Major Disaster, and issue two tying into the long-running Covenant of the Sword sub-plot that would not be resolved until the 75th issue of Savage Dragon some years later. Chelsea Nirvana, the daughter of Mighty Man's old villain Dr. Nirvana, tricks her way into becoming the secretary for the group.

Issues #3, #4, and #5 featured the series' first story arc, with Chelsea Nirvana using one of her father's old inventions to clone Mighty Man, Ricochet and Barbaric (twice, after failing to remember Superpatriot was mostly robotic) resulting in a public battle between the clones and the originals. Vanguard, an ally of the Dragon, was sucked into the fight. During clean up, Mighty Man, Barbaric and Ricochet were attacked by the Inhabitor, who was able to stretch inanimate objects, mostly floors and walls.

Issue #6 detailed the origins of Mighty Man and Rapture, and so in turn, the fate of Chelsea's father, who was killed during experimenting on Rapture. This is the incident that gave Rapture her superpowers. Issue #7 featured an appearance of the dangerously insane Detroit hero Killkat (later of the Deadly Duo) who is obsessed with Dart. Chelsea and Inhabitor team up.

Issues 8 & 9 introduced Jake Farrel, a government agent and old 'acquaintance' of Superpatriot, who enlists them to defeat metal eating ants that crash landed in Brazil. The story again guest-starred Vanguard, and was a cross-over with Cyberforce. Issue #10 was the only issue to feature The Dragon in any major way, in a stand-alone story featuring a bullied and abused teen Joey Finkleberry who wakes with incredible strength and murders his abusive father and classmates. He defeats Freak Force, but is talked into surrendering by the Dragon.

The final issues were divided up into three major story-arcs. 11, 12 and 13 had Jake Farrel once again drafting Freak Force, this time with two members of Superpatriot's old team The Liberty League Mr Big and Hornet to remove The Cosmic Cops, who had commandeered New York City with intentions of taking the populace. Horridus was revealed as being half extraterrestrial. She accidentally sabotages the Cosmic Cops, who flee. However both Mr Big and Hornet perish and Rapture's leg is broken. Annoyed at the team's performance Dart quits. Issues 14 and 15 feature Bludgeon, who was given powers by Johnny Redbeard. Mighty Man and Ricochet are in comas and it is Joey Finkleberry who saves the day. Dart and Mighty Man's friend, Phyllis Deeder, are captured by Chelsea and Inhibitor.

Issue #16 has a further confrontation with Chelsea, Redbeard and various other characters. Freak Force disbands, some of the group perform a rescue mission at a super-freak detainment camp and Chelsea changes genders.

This story continued on into the regular Savage Dragon series. Chelsea and Inhibitor’s gang, made up of her henchmen and other freed prisoners continued on with villainy. The Nixed Men, further creations of Johnny Redbead, joined up. She-Dragon mistook Chelsea Nirvana for Johnny Redbead, for Chelsea had changed into that form. The gang-lead Cyber-Face killed a number of Chelsea's men, then had Negate, who could remove powers, neutralize Chelsea. She ended up looking exactly like her father. Chelsea later gained some measure of revenge by killing Mighty Man's human host. Dart soon gained Mighty Man's powers.

== Mini-series ==
Concurrent with the end of the initial series, there was also a three-issue Freak Force mini-series, set after the "Mars Attacks Image" event, that ran from April 1997 to July 1997. Larsen was again involved overseeing the project, which was written by Larsen (with Eric Stephenson as co-scripter) and illustrated by Andy Kuhn.

The Mini-series had one story, that of the attack of the 'Frightening Force', a new team of enemies organised by Chelsea Nirvana, now a normal powerless man attacking the group out of revenge shortly after they became funded by Peter Klaptain, a rock singer who likes to insinuate he is the vigilante Star (when in fact it was a policeman Chris Robinson, who was his bodyguard, and in this story, his Limo driver) and added Star to the team's roaster, there is one sub-plot that of a prison break by a villain Ultimatum that releases Joe Finkleberry, Finkleberry is essential to ending the battle between Freak Force and Frightening Force, killing Inhabitor and Star. Negate takes Finkleberry's powers from him returning him to a normal boy.

Dart is not part of the major story, she is on holiday with her lover Justice, one of Superpatriot's children, the other, Liberty appears heavily pregnant, having been impregnated by Martians during the Mars Attacks Image event, Ricochet is also revealed to be pregnant.

Freak Force were absorbed into The Dragon's S.O.S project, a government sponsored team replacing Youngblood who were killed during the Mars Attacks Image event (in truth Rob Liefeld creator of the team was no longer part of Image Comics after being voted out by his co-founders) Barbaric and Ricochet were married in Savage Dragon issue 41 to help a lucrative merchandising deal, Rapture was killed an issue later while on an S.O.S mission and Dart was crippled in issue 47, she later gained the powers of Mighty Man.

== This Savage World ==
After killing Damian Darklord, The Savage Dragon caused an alternate Earth to exist, and the Earth the previous Freak Force inhabited was destroyed. However all of the Freak Force existed in this world.

Superpatriot has been the most featured, along with Mighty Man, originally under the control of the villain Cyberface, who was now running America. He is now a major support role. Anne Stevens, alive in this reality, had never realized she could become Mighty Man, and had to be shown by The Dragon and has been gradually getting more adept at superheroics. Dart was recently killed during a battle between Mako and The Savage Dragon. Barbaric and Ricochet were part of a gladiatorial arena that also included Madman. Rapture was shown to be morbidly obese.

== Analysis ==
According to John M. Trushell, principal lecturer at the University of East London, independent titles were inclined to parody X-titles and Image Comics’ Freak Force, operating as bounty hunters and superheroes-for-hire, parodied X-Factor and X-Force.
