= Smasher =

Smasher may refer to:

- Smasher, nickname of Art Shamsky (born 1941), American Major League Baseball outfielder and Israel Baseball League manager
- Smasher (Marvel Comics)
- Smasher (Image Comics)
- Smasher, codename of the comic book character Jennifer Dragon
- The Smasher, a comic strip character
- Smasher Sloan, a former professional wrestler
- Atom Zombie Smasher, a 2011 video game

== See also ==
- Smash (disambiguation)
