= Ant (Image Comics) =

Comic book character

- Hannah Washington as Ant on the textless cover to Ant Vol. 2 #11 (February 2007); Art by Mario Gully

Publication information
- Publisher: Arcana Studio; Image Comics
- First appearance: Ant #1 (February 2004)
- Created by: Mario Gully

In-story information
- Alter ego: Hannah Washington
- Team affiliations: Omega One
- Partnerships: Gadget Man
- Notable aliases: Antwoman; Bug Girl; Subject 9
- Abilities: Enhanced speed, strength, reflexes, and agility Ability to stick to walls and surfaces Hard skin body armor Whip-like antennae providing enhanced senses and doubling as melee weaponry

Ant (Hannah Washington) is a comic book superhero, created by Mario Gully. She first appeared in the eponymous series Ant #1 (February 2004), published by Arcana Studio.

Ant has also appeared in the Image Comics series Ant, Savage Dragon and Spawn.

== Publication history ==
The Ant comic was published by Arcana Studio in February 2004. The creator and artist, Mario Gully, has stated that the concept of Ant was created while he was incarcerated in 1996 for attempted armed robbery. Gully says that one day he was looking through a barred cell window and a tiny ant crawled in from the outside. He later vowed to change his life and make something out of himself. He then created Ant.

=== Vol. 1 (Arcana Studio, 2004) ===
Cover to Ant Vol. 1 #1 (February 2004) Art by Mario Gully

The first volume, published by Arcana Studio and titled "Days Like These", ran for 4 issues before moving to Image Comics. Gully worked with co-writer Matt Nixon in the first volume.

==== Plot ====
The original Arcana miniseries followed 8-year-old Hannah Washington, a lonely young girl continually tormented and bullied at school. Her father, apparently an accountant—and later on, a blue-collar employee—by profession, is made a suspect in an armed robbery and is taken into custody. To escape the harsh realities of her life, she writes in her diary stories of an alter-ego: an adult version of herself who is a superhero known as Ant.

Hannah appears to know more about the world than she ought to and often has the personality of an emotionally unstable young adult, and her new principal takes interest in her as a result.

She ends up unintentionally dropping her diary, and it is read and returned by her friend Stephen, who later on appears as "Gadget Man" in Ant's Cockroach battle, the events of which are followed whenever Hannah's diary is read or written into.

Hannah's father was released from custody but eventually, his home gets raided as the authorities apparently have the evidence they need to put him away. Hannah is found foaming at the mouth, having a seizure on the floor.

The son of the man he allegedly killed pushes for the death penalty—which would normally be too severe a punishment, but due to his influence, his demands are met and Hannah's father is sentenced to death.

Hannah's mother, Betty, working as a cabaret dancer, had left many years ago and she makes an unwelcome step back into Hannah's life, since Hannah's father requested her to. However, after reading her diary Betty comes to the conclusion that it was a mistake to leave.

Meanwhile, Ant is beaten by the Cockroach and loses her exoskeleton. Stephen rescues her and gives her a can which recharges her blood-sugar and her exoskeleton grows back. She then defeats the Cockroach.

Hannah finally manages to obtain information using Ant to clear her father's name—it turns out that the murdered man's son, and Betty's rich lover, was the actual culprit; but he is shot dead by the police when he is about to kill Betty, who has just discovered his guilt. Hannah's happiness at getting her parents together is short-lived, though. When told by the policewoman Inez that it is impossible for Ant to have helped Hannah as she had said Ant was who she would be in the future, she blacks out, and eventually ends up awakening in a straitjacket confined possibly in a sanitarium somewhat into her middle teens. The news of her revival brings forth a visit from her mother, who is in bereavement when informing Hannah of her father's apparent demise. This piece of info shocks Hannah. She manages to escape, leaving behind one of the cans she used to regenerate her exoskeleton in her story, which leads on to the second volume.

=== Vol. 2 (Image Comics, 2005–2007) ===
The second volume, published by Image Comics and titled "Reality Bites", featured heavy hitters such as Spawn and the Savage Dragon as co-stars, featuring an Invincible plush doll. This series ran for 11 issues.

Issue #8 became infamous for a scene where a stripper removes her underwear, exposing her posterior. The creator later apologized for the scene.

==== Plot ====
An adult Hannah Washington wakes up in a mental institution, where she has been told all her memories are the result of a coping mechanism described as a "juvenile power fantasy." But, little by little, her fantasies of her life as Ant become more and more real.

=== Vol. 3 (Big City Comics, 2008) ===
Ant: Unleashed is the third volume of the series, released in 2008 by Big City Comics. This run focuses on a more mature version of Ant. Six issues were scheduled, but only the first three were published as of May 2008, later issues being cancelled without a resolution to the story. Ant subsequently appeared in the spin-off miniseries Omega One, featuring Shi.

=== Vol. 2 continued (Image Comics, 2021) ===
In 2012, Mario Gully sold Ant to Savage Dragon creator Erik Larsen. Fourteen years after its previous issue was published, Ant's second volume was concluded with its 12th issue in June of 2021, written and illustrated by Larsen.

=== Vol. 4 (Image Comics, 2021–2022) ===
The fourth volume of the series was launched in November 2021 by Image Comics, written and illustrated by Erik Larsen. This series ran for 6 issues.

== Powers and abilities ==
Ant possesses the typical enhanced speed and strength of many bug-based superheroes. She can lift up to 5 tonnes without sweating but have the potential to reach 7 tonnes in extreme conditions. She has superb stamina which allows her to perform at her peak for 48 hours until fatigue kicks in. In addition she has bladed antennae which provide her with superhuman-level senses and weapon application. One of the more interesting aspects of the character is her exoskeleton, which appears to be regenerated by use of her blood-sugar. When her armor wears down, it breaks off rather quickly and she must recharge her blood-sugar in order to regenerate it. She seems to use some kind of spray-can with an ant symbol to do this.
