= Vanguard (character) =

- Vanguard #1

Publication information
- Publisher: Megaton Comics; Image Comics
- First appearance: Megaton #1 (Nov. 1983); First Image appearance: The Savage Dragon #2 (July 1993)
- Created by: Gary Carlson, Erik Larsen

In-story information
- Alter ego: Vanguard Thakka
- Team affiliations: Brigade
- Abilities: Abnormally strong, boots allow flight, helmet allows him to speak any language on any planet.

Vanguard is an alien superhero created by Gary Carlson and Erik Larsen for Carlson's self-published comics anthology Megaton. Vanguard is a white alien with small antennae who has been given the unenviable job of guarding Earth, which is viewed by the aliens as boring with little chance of anything happening. His sole companion is a sarcastic, hovering cycloptic robot and their morphing androids, though he quickly developed a relationship with a reporter Roxanne Wells.

Following Larsen's departure from Marvel Comics and co-founding of Image Comics he and Carlson re-tooled the character slightly and re-introduced him as a part of Larsen's Savage Dragon's universe of which he was a close part, via Image he received two mini-series, Vanguard and Vanguard: Strange Visitors and a 1-shot but frequently appeared in Savage Dragon, Freak Force and the third volume of Teenage Mutant Ninja Turtles as well being a member of Rob Liefeld's short-lived re-vamp of Brigade before Liefeld's expulsion.

== Fictional character biography ==
=== Megaton ===
In Megaton comics, Vanguard has already been watching Earth for sometime, and was already in a relationship with Roxanne Wells. Erik Larsen's first fully professional work was on the title (though Graphic Fantasy pre-dated it).

Cosmo VII, a Soviet Union robot assaulted Vanguard, Wally and Roxanne in Vanguard's space station, drawing him to Earth (as Supreme would in his Image series) and leading to conflict between the United States and the USSR and between Vanguard and the Savage Dragon's S.O.S and Mighty Man.

=== Vanguard ===
The initial six-issue series was written by Vanguard creator Gary Carlson and featured a 'revolving door' of artists that included Joe Madureira. In the text of the final issue it was implied that the comic was originally intended to be an ongoing series, rather than a mini-series, but various issues, including the revolving door of artists, led to it being prematurely ended.

Following on from a back-up story, Vanguard began his series fighting Supreme, Supreme had encountered Vanguard's race while in his exile in space. The fight resulted in Earth's first contact with Vanguard, and ended in Chicago with Supreme the victor and Vanguard was left outside the Savage Dragon's police department, arrested and taken to a maximum security prison, which he was swiftly broken out of by his robot aid Wally using their teleporter and one of their shape-shifter robot drones, Lurch. Unfortunately, the teleportation went wrong and sent Vanguard to a science lab, and Lurch had a glitch that made him rebellious. Lurch, posing as Vanguard escaped and fought The Dragon, while Vanguard escaped the space station and accidentally caused the overweight female scientist there to become a super-villain 'Modem' who could control robotics/electronics.

Vanguard was able to intervene with Dragon and Lurch's battle, which led to his first meeting with Roxanne Wells. Wells had found Vanguard's helmet, which he had lost during his fight with Supreme, and had repaired it. Able to speak English once more, the situation was resolved, only for Wally, under the control of Modem, to battle both Dragon and Vanguard. First, in Chicago and then on Vanguard's ship. Vanguard teleported Modem's molecules across the vastness of space.

Issue 5 featured a fight between Vanguard and a time-traveller called Berseker, and Issue 6 featured Vanguard's first date with Roxanne, and his battle with the Imagineer, an old man who used a machine to become various super-criminals.

Vanguard continued to feature in The Savage Dragon and Freak Force series after this, helping Freak Force against their clones, and Freak Force and Cyberforce against alien, metal eating ants. Lurch was particularly crucial in the Savage Dragon, he posed as Lt. Frank Darling and allowed the policeman to fake his death to escape blackmail from Overlord and the Vicious Circle, only for the robot to survive and continue to attack Overlord over and over revealing the man to be alive.

Issue two of Vanguard's initial six-issue series featured a mysterious back-up story; this story was not explained until some time later, when the character appeared in the third volume of Teenage Mutant Ninja Turtles as a villain.

Vanguard attempts to assist when reality threatens to fracture into six different Earths. 'Tremors' tear him away.

=== Strange Visitors ===
Much of Strange Visitors focussed around a long fight between Vanguard and a giant hulking alien called 'Amok', the series guest starred a number of other characters including Supreme, Glory, Badrock, WildC.A.T.S, The Dragon and Freak Force. Gary Calrson again wrote the series and art was by Scot Eaton.

After Vanguard met Roxanne's parents and defeated Modem again, Amok crashed to earth destroying a NASA space station in the process, this destruction was blamed on Vanguard who clashed with Amok, whom he knew as a slave' on Vanguard's homeworld (yes, on Vanguards planet Slavery existed and this slaves just happened to be brown-skinned people who revolted and were wiped out) and the last survivor of an extinct planet (Radan), Amok kidnapped Roxanne and Vanguard enlisted the help of Supreme in rescuing her, with the final issue dedicated to a long fight between Amok and a number of guest stars. After beating Vangard, Supreme and quite a few of the guest stars senseless, even punching Supreme so hard he was knocked to outer space. Upon regaining consciousness Supreme charged back to earth with vengeance on his mind to deliver his best punch. Amok took Supreme's best punch and flattened him, much to the amazement of the multiple guest stars cowering in anticipation of the coup-de-grace from Supreme. After laughing at Supreme's best shot it was apparent Amok could not be beat physically. Against the wishes of even Roxanne who could now understand Amok as it took him some time to adapt to English, Vanguards robot pal telekinetically gave Amok a lobotomy (even after finding out Amok was not a senseless brute but just crazed from the loss of his family and profiled because of his enormous size and demeanor).

Aside from the One-Shot Ethereal Warriors, which teamed him with Ethrian, a character created by Frank Fosco (who pencilled the special) Vanguard's appearances since Strange Visitors were mostly in a supporting role, assisting The Dragon mostly and also the Teenage Mutant Ninja Turtles, it was revealed by Larsen (source needed) that Vanguard was positioned to watch for the Cosmic Cops that attacked in the Freak Force ongoing series.
