= Marvel Illustrated =

Imprint of Marvel Comics

- Parent company: Marvel Comics
- Predecessor: Marvel Classics Comics
- Founded: 2007
- Country of origin: U.S.
- Headquarters location: New York City
- Key people: Roy Thomas, Eric Shanower, Nancy Butler, Skottie Young
- Publication types: Comic books
- Fiction genres: horror, fantasy, adventure

Marvel Illustrated was a Marvel Comics publishing imprint specializing in comic book adaptations of classic literature. Each novel's story is told in the form of a limited series, the issues of which are later collected as a trade paperback. Writer Roy Thomas has adapted many of the titles; the imprint is also known for its six adaptations of books from the Land of Oz series, all done by Eric Shanower and Skottie Young; and its four adaptations of Jane Austen novels by writer Nancy Butler.

== History ==
Marvel Illustrated was started in 2007, the first attempt by the company to adapt classic literature since the short-lived 1970s series Marvel Classics Comics. Their first title was a 64-page one-shot adaptation of Rudyard Kipling's The Jungle Book, by Mary Jo Duffy, Gil Kane, and P. Craig Russell, which collected material originally published in 1983 in Marvel Fanfare. Other titles launched in 2007 included The Last of the Mohicans, The Man in the Iron Mask, and Treasure Island, all of which were adapted by Roy Thomas.

2008 saw publications of The Iliad, Moby-Dick, The Picture of Dorian Gray, and The Three Musketeers, all adapted by Thomas.

In 2009 Marvel Illustrated published Kidnapped and Thomas' telling of the Trojan War, as well as the first of Nancy Butler's adaptations of Jane Austen, Pride and Prejudice. That was the year they also released Shanower & Young's adaptation of The Wonderful Wizard of Oz, which has been followed by The Marvelous Land of Oz (2010), Ozma of Oz (2011), Dorothy and the Wizard in Oz (2011–2012), and The Road to Oz (2012–2013).

In 2010, the imprint published Dracula, adapted by Thomas and Dick Giordano, which collected material originally published in the 1970s and mid-2000s. They also published Butler's adaptation of Sense and Sensibility, illustrated by Sonny Liew.

In 2011, they published Butler and Janet K. Lee's adaptation of Emma; since then the imprint has only released Oz adaptations.

== Titles ==
- The Jungle Book (Apr. 2007) — adapted by Mary Jo Duffy, Gil Kane, and P. Craig Russell; originally published in Marvel Fanfare issues #8–11 (May–Nov. 1983).
- The Last of the Mohicans (July–Dec. 2007) — adapted by Roy Thomas, Steve Kurth, and Denis Medri
- Treasure Island (Aug. 2007–Jan. 2008) — adapted by Roy Thomas, Mario Gully, and Pat Davidson
- Alexandre Dumas' d'Artagnan Romances, adapted by Roy Thomas
  - The Man in the Iron Mask (Sept. 2007–Feb. 2008) — art by Hugo Petrus, and Tom Palmer
  - The Three Musketeers, prequel to The Man in the Iron Mask (Aug. 2008–Jan. 2009) — art by Hugo Petrus, and Tom Palmer
- Homer adaptions by Roy Thomas
  - The Iliad (Feb.–Sept. 2008) — art by Miguel Angel Sepulveda, and Sandu Florea
  - The Odyessy (Sept. 2008–April 2009) — art by Greg Tocchini
- The Picture of Dorian Gray (Feb.–July 2008) — adapted by Roy Thomas and Sebastian Fiumara
- Moby-Dick (Apr.–Sept. 2008) — adapted by Roy Thomas, Pascual Alixe, and Victor Olazaba
- Kidnapped (Jan.–May 2009) — adapted by Roy Thomas, Mario Gully, and Jason P. Martin
- L. Frank Baum's Oz books, adapted by Eric Shanower and Skottie Young
  - The Wonderful Wizard of Oz (Feb.–Sept. 2009)
  - The Marvelous Land of Oz (Jan.–Sept. 2010)
  - Ozma of Oz (Jan.–Sept. 2011)
  - Dorothy and the Wizard in Oz (Nov. 2011–Aug. 2012)
  - The Road to Oz (Nov. 2012–May 2013)
  - The Emerald City of Oz (July-Dec. 2013)
- Jane Austen adaptations, written by Nancy Butler
  - Pride and Prejudice (June–Sept. 2009) — art by Hugo Petrus
  - Sense and Sensibility (July–Nov. 2010) — art by Sonny Liew
  - Emma (May–Sept. 2011) — art by Janet K. Lee
  - Northanger Abbey (Nov. 2011-March 2012) - art by Janet K. Lee
- The Trojan War (July–Nov. 2009) — by Roy Thomas, Miguel Angel Sepulveda, and Jason P. Martin
- Dracula (July–Sept. 2010) — adapted by Roy Thomas and Dick Giordano; collects material originally published in Dracula Lives #5–11 (Mar. 1974–Mar. 1975), Legion of Monsters #1 (Sept. 1975), and Stoker's Dracula #2–3 (2005)

== See also ==
- Classics Illustrated, from Gilberton, which produced 169 adaptations of classic stories from 1941 to 1968.
- Joyas Literarias Juveniles, from the Spanish publisher Editorial Bruguera, which produced 270 adaptations of classic stories from 1970 to 1983. 28 of these have been translated into English and published as King Classics.
- Pendulum Press, 1970s publisher of comic book literary adaptations
- Classical Comics, a British publisher producing graphic novel adaptations of the great works of literature, including Shakespeare, Charlotte Brontë, and Charles Dickens
- PAICO Classics, Indian series similar to Classics Illustrated
- Self Made Hero, British company producing adaptations of literature, including some of the same Shakespeare plays as Classical Comics
- Graphic Classics, American anthology series produced since 2002
- Les Grands Classiques de la littérature en bande dessinée, French series of classics adaptations, published in 2017–2018 and incorporating titles from two previous series
