= Vicious Circle (comics) =

Publication information
- Publisher: Image Comics
- First appearance: The Savage Dragon #1 (July 1992)
- Created by: Erik Larsen

In-story information
- Type of organization: Criminal organization
- Base(s): Mobile throughout Chicago
- Leader(s): Overlord, BrainiApe, Cyberface, Horde, Buster Justice, Allison Summers
- Agent(s): Abner Cadaver, Skullface, Basher, Powerhouse, Mako, Open Face, Octopus, Bud Ugly, Roughneck, Undermind, Download, Fever, Cutthroat, Hellrazor, Moregore, Imposter, Brute, Megatech, Vein, Chaos & Control, Bug-Lady, Volcanic, Animal, Dataman, Raw Dog, Deathmask, Negate, Furious George, Raging Woody, Inferno, Bodycount, Gateway, Washout, Glowbug, Weed, Carcass, Assassin, Soundstorm, Heavy Flo, Bad Axe, Strongarm, Toastmaster, Vandal, Hazard, Hardware, Wreckage, Killzone, Lowblow, Mace, Dung, Shard, Roadblock, Doubleheader, Brain-O, Evil Eye, Neutron Bob, Brawn, Bloop, Wildhair, Mindwarp, Bludgeon, Super-X, Lightning Bug, FirePower, Human Sparkler, Samurai, Nuke Rage, Squid, Arachnid, Sub-Human, Fade, Ultimatum, Rushmore, Cesspool, Joey Finkleberry, Flap Trap, Bagman, Major Disaster, Rock Woman, Hive, Absorbing Junior, Quill, Tech, Bug, Double-Page, Belcher, Nasal Ned, Slab, Backfire, Inhabitor, Critical Mass, Johnny Nitro

The Vicious Circle is a criminal organization of mutants, cyborgs, monsters, assassins, and magicians that serves as the primary opponents for the superheroes in Erik Larsen's comic-book titles, primarily the Dragon.

== Overview ==
The group has a varying line-up, sometimes consisting of five-to-six members and sometimes having a staggeringly huge membership. Originally the Vicious Circle was led by the Overlord, an armored mastermind who ruled all of Chicago's underworld. Later, it would be ruled by the technology controlling Cyberface. Once the Savage Dragon started policing the streets of Chicago, the Vicious Circle began to falter and its members started winding up in prison, the hospital or just plain dead. The Vicious Circle remains a consistent thorn in the Savage Dragon's side, and frequently faces off with the SuperPatriot and others, including Raphael of the Teenage Mutant Ninja Turtles, who in issues 10 and 11 of the series run with Image took on the entire Vicious Circle himself in a bar fight.

The Circle desires to utterly control Chicago. Members have attacked the Dragon time and time again, willing to kill anyone who gets in their way. Occasionally, they use subtler methods.

A power vacuum causes an inter-faction war, ending with the sex-changed Johnny Redbeard in charge.

Using insiders, they have Dragon fired and replaced with a more buffoonish superpowered hero, She-Dragon. However, this plan fails as She-Dragon is carefully trained by other police officers and becomes a credible threat.

The Circle is briefly part of the superhero/gang war that erupts in New York City, as mentioned in Wildcats #28.

Circle members are part of the heroic resistance when Martians attack Earth, though they try to claim power and territory once the Dragon kills all the aliens.

After the alien invasion, the Dragon shrunk much of their group with a Martian device, sucked them up in a vacuum cleaner and tossed them out the window. The shrunken members were then used to free other members from jail.

Presumably, the Vicious Circle, along with most of Earth, are dead after a cosmic entity named Universo attacks the planet. Some people of this Earth survived to travel to another, but it is not known whether any Circle members did.

== Leaders ==
=== Overlord ===
Overlord
- Overlord battles his archenemy on the cover to Savage Dragon #7, January 1994. Art by Erik Larsen.

Publication information
- Publisher: Image Comics
- First appearance: The Savage Dragon #1 (July 1992)
- Created by: Erik Larsen

In-story information
- Alter ego: Antonio Seghetti; Victor Nixon; Flash Mercury
- Team affiliations: Vicious Circle
- Abilities: Brilliant criminal leader. Wears a suit of cybernetic powered armor that enhances his strength and protects him from harm.

Overlord first appeared in Larsen's Savage Dragon series, serving as that title's first principal villain and the archenemy of the Dragon. Like many of Larsen's characters, Overlord was based on a character that Larsen had created during his childhood. First conceived as "Bronzeman", a sort of criminal counterpart to Iron Man, Larsen later found he disliked the name and changed it to Overlord. The character's costume also went through multiple revisions before Larsen was satisfied.

==== Fictional character biography ====
Overlord is a Chicago-based crime lord named Antonio Seghetti with extensive ties to the Mafia and the European pocket nation of Lieberheim. As a child, he kills his sister's rapist during the act itself. Though noble, he starts a downward spiral into thuggery. He soon is involved in all sorts of crime, including rape itself.

In the 1990s, the superhuman population of the world skyrockets, resulting in Seghetti's illegal operations being threatened. In response, Saghetti has Sebastian Kahn (a cybernetics genius) design and construct for him a powerful battlesuit to wear. Donning the armor, Saghetti dubs himself Overlord and recruits countless superhuman thugs into his criminal empire, calling the group the Vicious Circle. With superhuman agents, he breaks away from his Mafia connections and Overlord soon has the city of Chicago at his mercy. The Overlord's luck changes when the Savage Dragon becomes a police officer. The Dragon began to dismantle his empire piece by piece. Later the Overlord also has to contend with Kahn, who had been technologically augmented and is now called CyberFace. CyberFace leads a team of superhumans called the Annihilators against the Vicious Circle, but is arrested. After negotiating with the police, CyberFace plans to testify against Overlord and reveal his identity. Overlord panics and dispatched several assassins. Cyberface ended up dead in his cell, having been poisoned through his food. He is soon revived through artificial means.

Dragon's first confrontration with Overlord ends with being thrown off a roof and impaled on a church spire. Later, the Dragon returns with a S.W.A.T. team. The other police officers are killed almost instantly. The Dragon takes apart Overlord's armor and shoots him in the mouth, one of his few vulnerable spots. Overlord falls off the roof, breaking a spire and slamming into the sidewalk.

==== Armor On ====
Other forces conspire to send Dragon to hell, though Dragon does not believe it is real. Nevertheless, he viciously torments Antonio when they meet. Antonio has his armor recreated by mystical means. The Dragon bites off Antonio's finger and spits it through the man's head.

Since then, Overlord's armor has been used by others who have tried to gain power in the Chicago underworld. Some, such as Brainiape, must deal with literally not being able to fit into the armor. Then there was Victor Nixon, Chicago Police officer. He had developed an attraction to the married Rita Meadermade. His use of the armor to spy on her corrupts Nixon, mixing his thought patterns with Antonio's remnants. Nixon ends up killing Rita's other stalker, her homicidal brother-in-law. He also seemingly kills Dragon's wife, but Jennifer had been replaced by a double. Nixon then gathers a force of villains to go after Dragon. This fails and in a one-on-one confrontation with the Dragon, Nixon is beaten to death. His identity is only discovered after the fact.

Under careful supervision, the armor is destroyed in a fire.

In an alternate dimension, the armor is used by a mysterious figure to keep the Vicious Circle in line with the mutation-granting blood of Dragon. Overlord claims to be trying to turn the Circle 'straight', to become a mutated-beings rights group. As part of this goal, he works unofficially with the police. These stated goals suffer a setback after the Dragon, overcome by his previous persona of evil Emperor Kurr, kills many of the Circle's powered forced.

==== In other media ====
Overlord is the main villain in the short lived Savage Dragon animated series, voiced by Tony Jay.

=== Cyberface ===
Cyberface
- Cyberface. Art by Mark Welser

Publication information
- Publisher: Image Comics
- First appearance: Savage Dragon (vol. 2) #5 (October 1993)
- Created by: Erik Larsen

In-story information
- Alter ego: Sebastian Khan
- Team affiliations: Vicious Circle
- Abilities: Technology manipulation, superhuman strength and invulnerability

Cyberface (Sebastian Khan) is a supervillain and enemy of the Dragon in the Image Universe. He first appears in Savage Dragon (vol. 2) #5 and was created by Erik Larsen.

==== Fictional history ====
The city of Chicago has long been renowned for its organized crime, most famously during the infamous reign of Al Capone. The mobs and gangsters managed to retain power for decades but the growing superhuman population threatened their rule by the early 1990s. A Mafia crime lord, Antonio Seghetti, saw this growing menace and acted on it. He had his second-in-command, Sebastian Khan, exercise his technological expertise to try and come up with an answer to the freaks.

The mob had a healthy relationship with the small country of Lieberheim and it's ruthless dictator, Dread Knight, was given a prototype suit of armour to increase his influence of power, as well as constructing him a legion of android soldiers, the Dreadheads.

With the success of the original armour, Khan improved upon his own designs and created the nigh-invulnerable armour that would allow Seghetti to assume the role of OverLord. In this new role, the crime lord was forced to remain within his suit or face certain death from the freaks he has subdued and recruited into his new organisation, the Vicious Circle.

OverLord soon spent less and less time with his Mafia associates while maintaining his new persona twenty-four hours a day. Khan was abandoned and left the mob to pursue other plans. At some unknown point, Khan gained superhuman powers to manipulate all technology and he took on the guise of CyberFace. Gathering a number of other superpowered criminals, CyberFace formed the Annihilators and prepared them to seize control of the Vicious Circle. Unfortunately for him, the Chicago Police Department's Freak Force program interfered and apprehended him, as well as trapping the Annihilators in a dimensional limbo.

While in police custody, CyberFace was poisoned on the orders of OverLord and was presumed dead. Desperate to get CyberFace back so that he can testify against OverLord, as he is the only man able to identify the armoured crime lord in his human guise, the Dragon takes the dead man's carcass to the government's Project: Born Again program. The villain was partially resurrected before the facility was destroyed, and CyberFace wandered back to Chicago and was manipulated by Octopus, planning to use him to conquer the Vicious Circle.

Octopus was later apprehended and CyberFace was cleared of any charges after giving evidence against OverLord so that a warrant for his arrest could be made. Shortly after, Horde took possession of CyberFace and used his might to become the new leader of the Vicious Circle after the Dragon had killed OverLord.

Due to the incomplete resurrection, CyberFace slowly began to degenerate and was saved from death by Abner Cadaver, who infused him with the life essences of some of the Undead. This lifeforce was very unstable, and when CyberFace attempted to conquer Chicago in light of the Martian invasion, he was destroyed by a single punch from the Dragon.

Octopus, OpenFace and PowerHouse revived CyberFace in the gorilla body of BrainiApe, and he stole the OverLord armour from the government as part of a bid to reclaim the Vicious Circle, now under the leadership of Horde. In a mass battle which killed Horde, the remains of CyberFace were finally destroyed by BrainiApe.

==== Savage World ====
CyberFace formed the Annihilators and took them to seize control of the Vicious Circle. CyberFace managed to successfully claim leadership away from OverLord, who he then killed. From this point on, Khan's sphere of influence continued to expand and the Vicious Circle soon became a serious force to be reckoned with.

When the Cosmic Cops invaded Earth in 1994, they managed to decimate much of New York City and looked set to expand their precincts to contain much of the planet. No heroes were able to get close enough to accomplish anything and numerous teams were being monitored and threatened with death if they acted. It was only when CyberFace entered the fray that the aliens were defeated.

CyberFace used the Cosmic Cops' technology to defeat the invaders and convert them into cybernetic entities. CyberFace then took control of New York City after Chicago, expanding his control. CyberFace was difficult to oppose due to his acquisition of the Cosmic Cops' technology.

Three years later when the Martians launched their mammoth invasion of Earth and destroyed much of the planet, CyberFace again came to humanity's rescue, albeit to serve his own selfish gains. CyberFace defeated these latest aggressors and added their technology to his growing cache of equipment was able to seize complete control of Earth and became the King of the World.

Only one person tried to oppose CyberFace, and that was Dragon. He carried out a failed assassination attempt which led to his being named as public enemy number one with a huge bounty on his head. In May 1999, Dragon's mind took control of his alternate timeline's body and he began his own quest to depose CyberFace from power.

Over the next few years, Dragon proceeded to gather together a resistance movement that consisted of abandoned Vicious Circle members, the Underground Freaks and other freedom fighters. Dragon led an assault upon the White House which prompted CyberFace to flee up to the starship of Vanguard's but was unable to hide from his arch-enemy.

Dragon confronted his foe, leading him to the isolation booth that once housed the Possessor, neutralising his powers. This then allowed the hero to free Vanguard so that they can gas CyberFace, leaving him locked away in case his incredible abilities are needed to save the Earth in the future. He could still access remote units under his control such as Wally who shot the villain dead rather than turn into his loyal slave.

==== Powers and abilities ====
CyberFace has immense electro-magnetic abilities that allow him to effortlessly manipulate huge amounts of technology. He also possesses great strength and invulnerability.

=== Alison Summers ===
Alison Summers is the fifth main villain of the series and the niece of Dart 1 and Dart III.

=== Samurai ===
The new leader of the Vicious Circle.

== Members ==
=== Abner Carvader ===
A scientist of the Vicious Circle.

=== BrainApe ===
An ape with Adolf Hitler's brain.

=== Horde ===
Horde is a fictional villain in the comic book series Savage Dragon where he, 50 issues, a secret antagonist, plotting events from behind the scenes.

Horde is the wizard Fon~Ti, the wizard who grants mortals the power of Mighty Man. Trapped and controlled by Mighty Man's old enemy The Wicked Worm. Duplicated bodies of the worm covered Fon~Ti at the command of his old rival Abner Cadaver and used him to slowly take control of Chicago's super-powered criminal underworld.

Horde possesses a number of characters before stepping out of the shadows, the first character is possessed in the very first issue of the Savage Dragon's ongoing series. First the homeless freak The Shrew; then veteran hero Superpatriot; The Dragon himself, causing him to go on a mindless rampage nearly destroying the city of Chicago; vigilante Mace and wannabe heroine She-Dragon; before taking control of criminal Cyberface. Horde used Cyberface to control the Vicious Circle, the biggest super-criminal organisation in Chicago. When Cyberface was killed for the third time Horde revealed himself, took control of all of the Vicious Circle members with his worms.

The Vicious Circle under Horde's leadership cause enough problems to force The Dragon to return from Washington DC and deal with them himself in a final battle in the series' fiftieth issue. During the battle at their headquarters and despite Horde using She-Dragon's power gloves, The Dragon is able to kill off the Wicked Worms covering Fon~Ti with a can of industrial insect killer.

Fon~Ti returns eighth issues later to destroy his old enemy Cadaver and revive the Dragon fully, who had been killed shortly after destroying Horde.

Horde used the leech-like worms that covered his body to control people's minds. The Leeches, later referred to as 'Wicked Worms' (as they were all duplicates of The Wicked Worm), attached themselves at the base of each victim's skull. Each worm, it was later revealed, also had the intellect, personality and power of speech that the original Wicked Worm had.

=== Jimbo da Mighty Lobster ===
Jimbo Da Mighty Lobster was a large, super-powered anthropomorphic Lobster who cursed frequently and battled The Dragon simply to prove he was the stronger of the two. In the end The Dragon threw the fight to end the battle and Jimbo went away thinking he was indeed, the strongest. He was not seen again.

The character was the winner of Erik Larsen's 'Ultimate Character Creation Contest'. Launched in issue 1 of the Savage Dragon ongoing series with a deadline of July 31, 1993 fans could enter their finest creation (Hero or Villain), the prize was their character would appear in issue #10 and the creator would retain the copyrights. Several thousand entered and Larsen chose the winner (Jason Merritt).

Jimbo was incredibly strong and practically invulnerable, and instead of hands he had two powerful claws. He made his living as some kind of criminal, running illicit cargo by boat.

=== Mako ===
A mutant Shark-man.

=== Octopus ===
ORIGINAL IMAGE UNIVERSE

Unhappy with the way that OverLord was running the Vicious Circle, two of its seemingly minor members joined forces to try and claim power for themselves. Octopus and OpenFace performed a number of thefts from electronics warehouses such as Donner Electronics, killing any guards they encountered. This drew the attention of Officer Dragon along with neophyte heroes Justice and She-Dragon.

In the main warehouse of Donner Electronics, Dragon caught up with his suspects and OpenFace provided cover for his partner to escape. Despite being apprehended and ultimately sentenced to time in Stronghold Penitentiary, Octopus was able to remain at large and continue his plan. Octopus created a device using the stolen electronic mechanisms and used this invention to summon the recently resurrected CyberFace to him.

CyberFace became a mindless pawn of Octopus and was entombed below the city of Chicago to prevent his discovery by the police that very much wanted him back to testify against OverLord. Octopus was forced to abduct Officer Howard Niseman which led Dragon down into the sewers. He apprehended both the disorientated CyberFace and the enraged Octopus.

Octopus remained in prison until the Martian invasion decimated much of Chicago and allowed CyberFace to assert control. The police tried to get Octopus to help them bring down CyberFace but he escaped and gathered up the remains of his former pawn when his unstable body blew up. Octopus took this disembodied head and attached it to the body of BrainiApe.

CyberFace and Octopus were soon joined by PowerHouse and then Baby Boom and OpenFace in building up a rebellion against the rule of Horde over the Vicious Circle. This attempt left both Horde and CyberFace dead, leaving PowerHouse, BrainiApe and OverLord II battling for sole leadership. PowerHouse ultimately won out and installed Octopus as one of his inner circle.

OpenFace and Octopus aided the miniaturised Dataman in analysing and reversing a shrinking gun for the smaller Vicious Circle members so that the criminal organisation could return to full capacity. OpenFace was later reverted to a normal human when the second Nega-Bomb detonated. He and the rest of the Vicious Circle were left without purpose and were forced to restart their lives... until Universo consumed the entire planet.

SAVAGE WORLD

In this reality, Octopus was among the thirty or so Vicious Circle members that refused to pledge loyalty to CyberFace when he killed OverLord. Unfortunately, their exile to the devastated Chicago left these outcasts losing members until around half their number had fallen. Octopus managed to remain alive and was present when this group's fortunes begun to change.

The leader of this faction was HellRazor who was talked into an alliance with Dragon by his colleague Neutron Bob. These Vicious Circle thugs were part of a rebellion mounted against CyberFace's primary headquarters in the White House. Octopus came through such a dangerous conflict alive but was apprehended by the newly formed Liberty League before he could escape.

A massive breakout at Stronghold Penitentiary later occurred and Octopus was able to return to work with the Vicious Circle. The organisation was being restructured by SkullFace, using the older members as cannon fodder to eliminate Dragon. Octopus and OpenFace created a massive android that was deployed against their target but when it was destroyed, the pair was assumed to have been killed, but this was actually all a ruse. They had in fact created holographic illusions of themselves that they knew would be destroyed so that they could continue their research unmolested.

Octopus and OpenFace remained hidden for years and combined their efforts to draw the OverLord armour down from space where it was found by the Chicago Police Department. They activated the suit's most powerful photon blast to exterminate all of the officers present. Unfortunately, their plan to control the OverLord armour and conquer the Vicious Circle fell through when it was taken from them by an unknown figure. The duo fell in line behind the new OverLord and worked as his chief scientists, creating a way to employ Dragon's blood to restore older Vicious Circle members to their former glory, albeit with a Dragon-ised appearance.

SAVAGE DRAGON ANIMATED SERIES

Octopus appeared as a recurring villain in the Savage Dragon Animated series, and was voiced by Rob Paulsen.

=== Openface ===
Openface is a fictional scientist and secondary antagonist in Erik Larsen's Savage Dragon comic book series. He is a short, noseless man with olive skin whose head splits vertically to reveal a large Venus Fly Trap like second mouth with a large tongue. he was the main villain of Savage Dragon issue #12.

Openface was first seen stealing from a laboratory when the Dragon and new heroes Justice and She-Dragon interrupt them. Unable to free his head from Openface's second mouth, Dragon ripped out the villains tongue with his teeth, it was later stitched back on.

Having escaped during the prison break organised by Cyberface and, following his old partner's escape from prison 11 issues later, teamed up with Octopus to take control of the Vicious Circle criminal organisation. Once their plan failed, Openface was not seen again.

The Savage Dragon series was originally set on another Earth to the one it is now. On this new earth Openface took part in an attempted coup to liberate the world from Cyberface, who had become a dictator.

== Sources ==
- Savage Dragon issues 1, 10, 12, 38, 50, 58, Image Comics.
