= Mario Gully =

American comic book writer-artist

- Born: Anderson, Indiana, U.S.
- Areas: Writer, Penciller, Artist, Inker, Editor, Publisher
- Pseudonym: O.M.G.
- Notable works: Ant

Mario Gully (/ˈɡʌli/), also known professionally as O.M.G., is an American comic book writer-artist, who created the comic book series Ant, first published by Arcana Studio and later Image Comics. Gully drew illustrations for Marvel Comics from 2007 to 2009 before returning to freelancing.

== Career ==
=== Ant ===
Ant is a comic book series created by Gully about a girl who understands the adult world faster than other children. When she gets bullied by her schoolmates, she creates an imaginary world on drawing paper and a superhero, the Ant. According to Gully,

I invented Ant in jail in 1996. I was convicted of robbery and sentenced to one year and probation. The event was a turning point in my life. I used to draw portraits and hot chicks on envelopes for commissary. One day around day #6 of 358, I was depressed about where my choices in life put me. I was looking out the barred window and a single ant crawled in from the outside of my window seal. I said to myself 'Man, I wish I were an ant! Then I could crawl right out of this place and start my life all over!' Well, I couldn't pull that one off, so I decided to make a homemade comic book about it. It got around and I had a little audience with my cellmates. Really built up my confidence about drawing. That's when I realized that one day I could be a comic book artist. I sent out my first submission from the county jail. I hope one day my story can be an inspiration to anybody out there who has a dream.

After prison, he studied art independently and worked with co-writer Matt Nixon to continue the Ant comic series. Gully published Ant through Arcana Studio beginning in 2004 with variant covers by J. Scott Campbell and Joe Benitez. Ant later moved to Image Comics in 2005.

Ant #8 caused controversy with some readers and retailers due to adult content which was published without appropriate warnings in the solicitation. Image Comics later announced that Ant had been canceled, and Gully moved the title to a new publisher, Big City Comics, where he released a new Ant series, Ant: Unleashed. In 2012, Mario sold his character Ant to Savage Dragon creator and Image comics founder Erik Larsen. Mario's final Ant cover appeared on a variant cover for Ant vol. 4 #12, which was published on June 9, 2021.

=== Marvel Comics ===
Gully drew Marvel Illustrated: Treasure Island adapted by writer Roy Thomas. He teamed up with Thomas again for a new comic book called Marvel Illustrated: Kidnapped, a comic book series adaptation of a 19th-century adventure novel.

=== Freelancing ===
Gully launched a comic book series on Kickstarter, Dirty Bones, written and illustrated by Gully and colored by Thomas Mason. The story is about a dog who is caught up in the world of organized crime and forbidden love. Gully's crowdfund goal had aimed at $50,000. He said "This is my first big project since I created Ant." However, the funding failed with $17,532 and 145 backers. Gully's project, Original Mario Gully's Very First Sketchbook, was successfully crowdfunded on Indiegogo. The crowdfunding project includes commissions and signed prints; it is Gully's first book that contains sketch drawings. For this funding goal, he aimed at $3,000 and it was successful with $5,002 and 152 backers.

== Bibliography ==
- Ant #1–4 (script and art, Arcana Studio, February–October 2004)
- Ant #1–7 (script and art, Image Comics, August 2005 – June 2006, tpb Ant: Reality Bites collects Ant #1–4, 120 pages, April 2006, ISBN 1-58240-580-8)
- Ant: Unleashed #1–6 (script and art, Big City Comics, December 2007 – May 2008)
- Totem #1–7 (pencils, with writer Jeff Kaufman, Big City Comics, 2007–2008)
- Marvel Illustrated: Treasure Island (pencils, with writer Roy Thomas, 6-issue limited series, Marvel Comics, August 2007 – January 2008)
- Marvel Adventures: Hulk #6 (pencils, with writer Paul Benjamin, Marvel Comics, February 2008)
- "World Tour" (pencils, with Mike Raicht, in Exiles: Days of Then and Now, Marvel Comics, March 2008)
- Marvel Illustrated: Kidnapped (pencils, with writer Roy Thomas, 5-issue limited series, Marvel Comics, January–May 2009)
- Army of Darkness #24 (art, with writer Mike Raicht, Dynamite Entertainment, July 2009)
