= Savage Dragon =

Image Comics superhero

- Savage Dragon #1 (July 1992) by Erik Larsen

Publication information
- Publisher: Megaton Comics; Image Comics
- First appearance: As Paul Dragon: Graphic Fantasy #1 (June 1982); Cameo as the Savage Dragon: Megaton #3 (February 1986); First full appearance as the Savage Dragon: Savage Dragon #1 (July 1992); Malcolm Dragon: Savage Dragon #33 (November 1996); Malcolm's first appearance as the Savage Dragon: Savage Dragon #192 (November 2013)
- Created by: Erik Larsen

In-story information
- Alter ego: Kurr (legal name: Savage Dragon) (Savage Dragon I); Malcolm Dragon (Savage Dragon II)
- Team affiliations: Liberty League; Chicago Police Department; Special Operations Strikeforce
- Notable aliases: The Dragon, Mr. Dragon, Officer Dragon, Dragon
- Abilities: Superhuman strength, stamina, and durability; Accelerated healing factor

The Savage Dragon is the name of three superheroes created by Erik Larsen, published by Image Comics and taking place in the Image Universe. The comic initially follows the adventures of a superheroic police officer named the Dragon. The character first appeared as the Dragon in Graphic Fantasy #1 (June 1982) and first appeared as the "Savage Dragon" in Megaton #3 (February 1986), before starring as the protagonist of the ongoing comic book series The Savage Dragon.

The Dragon is a large, finned, green-skinned humanoid whose powers include super-strength and an advanced healing factor. He is also an amnesiac: his earliest memory is awakening in a burning field in Chicago, Illinois. Thus, for most of the series, the origins of his powers and appearance are a mystery to readers. At the beginning of the series, he becomes a police officer under the legal name "Savage Dragon" and battles the mutant criminal "superfreaks" that terrorize Chicago. Ultimately, the Dragon is revealed to be the amnesiac Kurr, tyrannical emperor of the known universe. After sacrificing himself in the thirty-ninth volume Merging of Multiple Earths, the Dragon is succeeded by his son Malcolm Dragon as the Savage Dragon, who becomes the new protagonist of The Savage Dragon. Paul Dragon is also introduced in a supporting role as a version of the original Dragon who survived his universe's destruction.

Together with Spawn, Savage Dragon is one of two Image Comics titles that debuted during the company's 1992 launch that continues to be published well into the early 2020s. Further, Savage Dragon is the only one of the two that has been written and drawn entirely by its creator for the entirety of its run, for which Larsen has been lauded*.

- The Savage Dragon #13 was written by Brandon Choi, pencilled by Jim Lee, and inked by Monica Bennett, and Joe Chiodo.

Savage Dragon is the longest-running full-color comic book to feature a single artist/writer. The character was also adapted into an animated series, which ran for two seasons (26 episodes) on the USA Network beginning in 1995.

The Savage Dragon was listed by Wizard as the 116th-greatest comic book characters of all time. IGN listed the Savage Dragon as the 95th-greatest comic book hero of all time, stating that he has the trappings of a great comic book hero.

== Publication history ==
Like many of Erik Larsen's characters, the Savage Dragon was created by Larsen while he was a child in elementary school. In his youth, Larsen drew the Dragon in homemade comic books. The original Dragon, inspired by elements from Captain Marvel, Batman, Speed Racer and later The Incredible Hulk, differs greatly from the modern incarnation. After launching Savage Dragon in a professionally published comic book, Larsen returned to the original and reworked his designs.

Much later, a greatly redesigned Savage Dragon was featured in two issues of Graphic Fantasy, a self-published title with a small print run, published by Larsen and two friends. In this incarnation, the Dragon was a widower and a retired member of a government-sponsored superhero team. Subsequently, the Dragon made another appearance in the third issue of Gary Carlson's Megaton Comics anthology Megaton—in its Vanguard strip, which Larsen had been drawing. In these appearances, the character of the Dragon remained basically the same as it had been in Graphic Fantasy, with a few details modified (such as the inclusion of his wife, who was dead in his previous incarnation). Both the Graphic Fantasy and Megaton issues containing the Dragon have since been reprinted in high-quality editions.

In 1992, when Larsen left Marvel to co-found Image Comics, he reworked the character for the new publication venture. This time, the Dragon was a massively muscled green amnesiac, who joined the Chicago police department after being discovered in a burning field. Initially debuting in a three-issue miniseries (with the first issue cover-dated July 1992), the Savage Dragon comic book met with enough success to justify a monthly series, launched in June 1993. To this day, Larsen continues to write and illustrate the series entirely by himself, and has maintained a reasonably consistent monthly schedule (save for occasional lapses) in comparison with the other original Image Comics titles.

According to Larsen, the series is aimed at "older Marvel readers who are about ready to throw in the towel on comics altogether. It's the missing link between Marvel and Vertigo. More mature than Marvel; less pretentious than Vertigo. The kind of comics [he wants] to read. [The] book is really self-indulgent."

As the series has progressed, it has become a 'Mature Readers' title with occasional nudity and strong language.

== Fictional character biography ==
For the initial miniseries and the first 38 issues of the ongoing series, the Dragon is a full officer of the Chicago Police Department, and he partners with officer Alex Wilde. Dragon and Wilde later have a casual sexual relationship. He receives the name of "Dragon" (due to his fin and green skin) from Nurse Ann Stevens, who later becomes a supporting character in Mighty Man.

=== Miniseries ===
The Dragon is found in a burning field by Lt. Frank Darling. At the time, Chicago is being terrorized by villainous "superfreaks" (Larsen's collective term for superpowered characters), namely the Vicious Circle, a criminal gang led by the mysterious Overlord. Realizing that the Dragon's superhuman powers can be a terrific boon to the police in battling the Vicious Circle, Darling asks the Dragon to join the police. At first, the Dragon refuses and takes a job in the warehouse of Darling's cousin. After a number of serious incidents, including the murder of the superhero Mighty Man and the brutal mauling of SuperPatriot, Darling takes drastic action. He pays Vicious Circle members to threaten his cousin in the hope that it will prompt Dragon to reconsider his offer. Although this achieves Darling's desired result, the two criminals, Skullface and Hardware, kill Darling's cousin and detonate a bomb in his warehouse. The Dragon joins the police, but Darling is now under the thumb of the Vicious Circle, causing him to steer the Dragon away from Vicious Circle activities.

Later, the Dragon gains a girlfriend, Debbie Harris, only to see her shot dead in his apartment by her jealous ex-boyfriend Arnold Dimple. The Dragon falls into a deep depression as a result. Dimple returns to plague the Dragon on several occasions as the Fiend, who makes a deal with the devil to gain supernatural powers.

=== Chicago PD ===
As well as being kept away from Vicious Circle activities, the Dragon is loaned out to other police forces across the country to help them in dealing with superpowered criminals. While on loan to the NYPD, he first meets the Teenage Mutant Ninja Turtles, whom he assists multiple times in later comics. Also during his time in New York, a large prison break occurs and a number of powerful criminals are killed. This is the first time the Chicago PD loses a star witness against the Overlord; Hardware, who intended to give evidence against the criminal, is shot dead.

Though Captain Darling's Freak Force program fails, the Dragon carries on a lasting relationship with one of its former members: Rapture, a former prostitute with electrical powers, who later has his child. Meanwhile, the Overlord's second-in-command Cyberface breaks away from the Vicious Circle to form a rival organization. Cyberface is later arrested but, like Hardware before him, he is killed before being able to testify. Ultimately, Cyberface is resurrected and later leads the Vicious Circle under the control of the Horde, another recurring villain.

Later, the Dragon makes his first attempt to arrest the Overlord, who easily defeats him and leaves him impaled upon a church spire. The Dragon is believed to be dead, but regenerates from his wounds afterwards. This is not the only time the Dragon is missing and presumed dead; it becomes both a recurring theme and running joke in the series. During his recovery, the Dragon is attacked by a person under the mental control of a strange worm. Under the domination of this creature, the Dragon goes on a rampage during which many innocent bystanders are injured or killed. He is finally stopped by the vigilante Mace, and the worms are traced to the Horde. The rampage results in a massive negative backlash against the Chicago Police Department, and the Dragon's biggest naysayer, R. Richard Richards, takes this opportunity to attack the Dragon with a robotic weapon dubbed the "Dragon Slayer". Later, the Dragon encounters the She-Dragon, a young superpowered woman who models herself after him.

Following an attack on the police station and the murder of Cyberface, the Dragon leads a SWAT team to finally take down the Overlord. The battle is harsh, and every member of the SWAT team perishes except for the Dragon, who is skinned alive. Even in his weakened state, the Dragon finally unmasks the Overlord as Mafia boss Antonio Seghetti, who subsequently falls to his death.

After aiding the Teenage Mutant Ninja Turtles for a second time, the Dragon narrowly survives another attack by the Fiend, which leaves him nearly crippled after his bones heal incorrectly. To make matters worse, Chicago is in the midst of a brutal gang war that arises as a result of the Overlord's death. The Vicious Circle, once kept tightly organized by the Overlord, separate into several factions that battle for criminal supremacy. The Dragon is found by a friendly cabbie and Mighty Man, who uses his super-strength to re-set the Dragon's bones. After recuperating from this ordeal, the Dragon fights another prison break, this time in a maximum-security facility torn open by a newly resurrected Cyberface. This battle marks the end of the gang war, and Cyberface assumes command of the Vicious Circle.

This victory is followed by difficult times for the Dragon. After a number of crossovers with other Image Comics characters including WildStar and The Maxx, the Dragon encounters Spawn and ultimately is sent to Hell by the Fiend. The Fiend can possess living bodies, and his powers are fueled by the capacity for hate of those possessed. His last victim is Debbie Harris' mother, who is unaware that the demon possessing her is the spirit of her daughter's murderer. While in Hell, a fist-fight occurs between God and the devil. God ends up being victorious. Just as the amnesiac Dragon begins to ask about his origins, God returns him to Earth.

Afterward, things grow steadily worse for the Dragon. He is unable to save ill fellow officer Phil Dirt with a blood transfusion. Meanwhile, Rapture (pregnant with the Dragon's child) suffers internal damage when the baby kicks—the unborn child having inherited its father's strength—and Rapture enters premature labour. The Dragon is not able to reach the hospital in time, and the baby appears to have died. However, in truth, the infant is taken by the Covenant of the Sword, a shadowy organization bent on world takeover.

After a crossover with Hellboy, the Dragon is caught up in the Mars Attacks and Mars Attacks/Savage Dragon event, in which he is responsible for destroying the Martians' bases on Mars using a Martian growth ray. This results in their retreat and possible extinction. While he is gone, the Vicious Circle takes control of the city. Returning home to a devastated Chicago, the Dragon is captured and publicly crucified by the Circle. The Dragon survives and defeats most of the villains, but his new superior, Captain Mendoza, suspends him for having been missing for so long. During his suspension, the Dragon spends a few months as a bounty hunter and helps rebuild the city after the Martian invasion.

=== S.O.S. years ===
Behind the scenes during this period, Rob Liefeld acrimoniously departed from Image Comics. The Shattered Image crossover and the Mars Attacks Image event were used as a way to phase out characters created by Liefeld from the collective "Image Universe", including Youngblood. In the pages of Savage Dragon, Larsen has the Dragon approached by the United States government to form a superhuman task-force to replace Youngblood. After negotiations, the team is dubbed the Special Operations Strikeforce, or S.O.S. This team includes much of the super-powered supporting cast of the book, including Jennifer Murphy, a super-strong, invulnerable single mother first introduced in The Savage Dragon: Sex & Violence miniseries. Despite being the founding member of the team, the Dragon spends little time as a member.

Later, on a dying parallel Earth, a murderous despot named Damian Darklord begins to swap parts of his Earth with parts from the Dragon's. The Dragon leads a team of S.O.S. members, including Jennifer Murphy and his former girlfriend Rapture, to this world to stop Darklord. Rapture is killed by Darklord, and the Dragon and Jennifer are separated from the rest of the team. While the remaining members of S.O.S. manage to stop the transfer and escape back to their own Earth, the Dragon and Jennifer are forced to find their own way off of the dying planet. While they make their escape, Dragon attempts to find this Earth's Rapture, only to find that world's Debbie Harris instead.

The threesome is lost in space for some months, and the Dragon is once again presumed dead, eventually landing on Godworld, where Debbie dies but is revived as an angel. The Dragon and Jennifer are caught in a battle between Thor and Hercules, and then sent back to Earth by All-God; Debbie does not return with them. Following this, the Dragon fights a Doctor Doom-like armored dictator before returning to Chicago on leave and striking up a casual sexual relationship with his former partner Alex Wilde.

In the giant-sized issue #50, many of the series subplots are resolved, and in a climactic battle among most of the series cast, the Dragon is killed by the mystic Abner Cadaver; however, the wizard is murdered midway through this by William Jonson, and the Dragon is bonded with him.

=== William Jonson and the new Overlord ===
The series changed its title to Savage She-Dragon for four issues, featuring her as the main character during an attack by the God Squad to retrieve the various super-freaks that were descendants of gods. This led to the S.O.S. returning to Godworld and its accidental destruction by S.O.S. member and former Deadly Duo member Kid Avenger. During this time, William Jonson realizes he and the Dragon are sharing bodies, and shortly thereafter the Dragon finds he has the ability to take over Jonson's body, so they become a masked superhero. While he is helping the She-Dragon, Jonson's fiancé, Rita Medermade, is kidnapped by Jonson's brother Ralph and they both encounter an individual wearing the Overlord armor. While rescuing her, Jonson is shot, Ralph is killed by the Overlord, and the Dragon is given full possession of his body.

Abner Cadaver returns—made up of parts of dead God Squad characters, Darklord, and the Dragon's arm—and engages in battle with Fon~Ti, the mystical being who was once the Horde. After Fon~Ti's victory, he separates the Dragon from Jonson and returns the Dragon to his normal body. Having admitted their love, Jennifer and the Dragon begin to date. After a fight with Impostor, posing as Rapture, the Dragon proposes to Jennifer, and their wedding follows in the next issue, in which Jennifer is apparently killed by the new Overlord. In truth, she was replaced with Impostor beforehand by the Covenant of the Sword. Though he had only been semi-active before, the Dragon officially resigns from the S.O.S. and became the legal guardian of Jennifer's daughter Angel. In the following issue, the Overlord subplot is tied up after the Dragon defeats his new team. The Dragon kills the Overlord, and he is revealed as supporting character Vic Nixon, who had worn the armor to spy on Rita; the armor then corrupted him. After this, the Overlord armor is destroyed.

=== Single parent and Damian Darklord ===
Following the resolution of the new Overlord plot, the series spent most of its issues wrapping up all the remaining subplots. This was preparation for the eventual revamp in issue #75, with the Dragon as a single parent looking after Angel and eventually losing a custody battle for her because of his dangerous lifestyle. The Dragon dated a television producer named Marcy Howard, resumed his casual affair with Alex Wilde, and dated Ann Stevens before she was murdered, while a number of super-powered children and adults were kidnapped by the Covenant of the Sword.

After losing custody of Angel and Ann's murder, the Dragon and Mighty Man (now former Freak Force member Dart) began searching for the missing SuperPatriot. This led them to the Covenant of the Sword, which had in its possession the SuperPatriot, Jennifer, and the Dragon's child. The Dragon and Mighty Man are captured, but eventually rescued in a large battle similar to the one in issue #50 in which a number of characters are killed.

It was revealed that the Covenant was formed by Damian Darklord, a time traveler who was the enemy of a vigilante named Super-Tough. This man became Darklord and started life as Damian, the son of Liberty, SuperPatriot's daughter who was raped during the Mars Attacks event. Damian also built and detonated the "Nega Bomb" made up of super-powered individuals that de-powered every non-natural "freak" in the world. The Dragon then kills him.

=== This Savage World ===
With issue #76, the series changed into a Jack Kirby-inspired post-apocalyptic/dystopian story. The Dragon is stuck in a new reality he created by killing the infant Damian Darklord, which prevented him from going back in time, and with most of the mutated and monstrous populace of this world trying to kill him. The Dragon finds his house to be a crater and believes Jennifer and Angel are dead. The Dragon has encounters with WildStar and Madman and finds out that during his time possessed, without Mace to stop him, he went on a much longer rampage, killing Alex Wilde. The Dragon also discovers that Cyberface is now President of America and has the SuperPatriot under his control. The Dragon organizes a group of old enemies and allies to defeat Cyberface. After fulfilling a commitment to Rex Dexter—who helped him overthrow Cyberface—by saving his daughter, the Dragon returns a hero and finds his way back to Chicago and is reunited with Jennifer and Angel, who had in fact survived.

The Dragon then finds his old world had survived as well as the Savage World. His counterpart from Darkworld, this Dragon, was defeated, but the Dragon's old Earth was destroyed by a world-devouring Galactus-like being named Universo, despite the best efforts of the Dragon and his son, Malcolm, who are left floating in space after its destruction. The Dragon is able to save Alex Wilde from that world. After this, the Dragon marries Jennifer and lives with her, Angel, and Angel's new "pet", Mr. Glum, who is secretly plotting to kill the Dragon.

To coincide with the 2004 U.S. presidential election, Larsen created a corrupt politician Ronald Winston Urass, who engineers a successful write-in campaign to elect the Dragon President of the United States. However, once his criminal intents and relationship to the criminal Dread Knight are exposed, the Supreme Court disallows these votes. This leads a vengeful Urass to attack the Dragon using the armor of his father, the Dread Knight, who was an old foe of the SuperPatriot's.

Behind the scenes, Erik Larsen was made publisher of Image Comics, causing a nearly year-long publishing gap between issues #121 and #122 of the series. The title resumed regular publication in January 2006, with the first story involving a vengeful scientist from Iraq sending an almost unstoppable robot to kill the President.

Mr. Glum's plans for world domination were realized using the power of the God Gun (a weapon able to grant three wishes to its user). Glum fires the gun and asserts his control of the planet while the Dragon is incapacitated in a hospital, having lost his rapid healing abilities. Glum was, at the time, on the run with the Dragon's stepdaughter Angel after he caused her to grow to more than 100 feet tall, and she accidentally destroyed her house and crippled her mother. The two become partners and Angel adopts a murderous, merciless personality, while Glum set the people of Earth to work with the impossible task of making the planet look like his face (as his old world did).

The Dragon is revived with his healing abilities restored and is able to defy Glum's control because of a loophole in his wish that means he cannot control extraterrestrials. The Dragon is unable to get close enough to Glum due to the various robots and villains Glum has under his control. However, the intervention of a number of characters from the comic series Wanted (the Killer and the Fraternity), who had come to steal the God Gun, allows the Dragon to destroy the weapon, negating Glum's wish.

During the story, Vanguard's spaceship is destroyed, freeing Universo who was imprisoned on it. He begins to suck the energy from Earth once more. Universo and its herald are killed by Solar Man, a Superman-like hero who became murderous and was wished out of existence using the God Gun, a wish undone by the Dragon's destruction of the weapon. The She-Dragon also returns from Dimension X with the Angel from the Dragon's original world of origin. They are being pursued by the Darkworld Dragon and a new villainess, Battleaxe.

=== Back to Basics ===
After Angel and Malcolm's return to the new world, the Savage Dragon is left to face a new array of troubles. With Jennifer having disappeared and presumed dead, two superstrong kids ill-equipped to face the return to normalcy after months spent in isolation (Angel has learning deficits and Malcolm is nearly illiterate), and no income to care for his family, the Savage Dragon returns to the police force.

Meanwhile, a new Overlord takes over the Vicious Circle, resuming his attacks over the city, and the Savage Dragon, hospitalized after a fight, is ambushed and killed by a new freak with the power to steal the memories and the life force of his enemies. Due to the huge amount of life force held by the Dragon and his powerful immune system, the freak absorbs all of his memories and physical characteristic, becoming essentially a new iteration of the Dragon. The Impostor Dragon has the remains of his former body packed in a preservative solution by Rex, and resumes his normal life.

Even this new lease at life appears to be short-lived, as the new Overlord, after trying to bargain with the Savage Dragon for his allegiance, blows his head and torso away: the Impostor Dragon, brought in the Vicious Circle laboratories for analysis, revives himself as a crazed, unstoppable, deformed powerhouse with conflicting memories, bent on nourishing himself on the superpowered Angel and Malcolm.

Still knowing nothing about the actions of the Impostor Dragon, Angel and Malcolm seek a way to revive the body of the Savage Dragon, despite being faced by Rex with the prospect of creating nothing more than a soulless being or a mind-addled monstrosity, due to the brain matter lost during the attack. They set off to ask Nurse Stevens for the last blood sample of the Dragon, hoping to use its regenerative abilities to speed up the recovery and the resurrection of the Savage Dragon corpse. The Vicious Circle, however, overpowers them, stealing the blood sample to create an army of Dragon clones.

As a last resort, after being faced by the Impostor Dragon who attacks Rex and is frozen in the preservative solution, Rex and Malcolm agree to transfuse part of Malcolm's blood into the Dragon's corpse. The Dragon revives, but has no memories of his former life.

=== Dragon Wars ===
Concerned about the new, harder attitude of the Dragon, the new Overlord sends the Dark Dragon after the Savage Dragon. Showing a callous disregard for human life, the Savage Dragon ultimately reveals to have regained every shred of his past memory as (Emperor) Kurr, and after beating up the Dark Dragon, he eats his brains, killing him for his defiance.

He then proceeds to alienate from himself Malcolm, planning vengeance over the Vicious Circle, now using the Dragon's blood to empower his members. The new Overlord decides to strike a truce with the police department as seen in #159. He lends the help of all the superfreaks in his command to stop Kurr. As the last attempt fails, Kurr sheds his facade, proclaiming his identity and retelling his origins (see below), for the first time in-universe speaking, to Malcolm and Angel. Battling his way through several enemies, including Vanguard, an unnamed Shapeshifter taking the She-Dragon's appearance, Glum, the original Angel, and other friends and foes from his past, Kurr cleanses Earth of human life using a special venom.

After he battles and kills Malcolm, the Impostor Dragon wakes up, this time with the Savage Dragon's personality fully in charge, and avenges his offspring and world by killing the Kurr-Dragon. Damian Overlord proceeds to restore his original look and body, giving the Savage Dragon the opportunity to greet his species and leave the cleansed Earth in their care.

Distraught by the consequences of Kurr's actions, he pleads with Damian Overlord for the power to travel back in time and kill Kurr before he unleashes the potion, thus creating another divergent timeline where his family is still alive. Damian grants his wish, mercilessly killing him shortly thereafter as "Savage Dragon is a dangerous wildcard for the world". Despite a red herring implying Damian transplanted Savage's personality into WildStar's body, in the "restored" timeline Kurr's alien son, along with a "mysterious gentleman", takes away Virus' corpse (as he is now calling the Impostor Dragon), taking it on to his spaceship, where Virus and Kurr are used to return the Savage Dragon to life. The Savage Dragon decides to keep his resurrection hidden to Earthlings, and to make amends with his species, offers to help them to find a suitable planet.

After the Dragon Wars, Malcolm Dragon has taken the Savage Dragon's role, along with his sister Angel, acting as protectors of the city. A schism in the superfreaks has brought the Overlord working with the police department, with a part of the freaks still engaging in villainy, and Malcolm to keep them in check.

=== Origin revealed ===
The Savage Dragon's origin was revealed in the Image Comics tenth Anniversary hardcover book, which was released on November 30, 2005. The collection featured stories by the four remaining Image founders (Erik Larsen, Todd McFarlane, Marc Silvestri, and Jim Valentino) returning to the characters they first created for the company. Larsen's story revealed that the Dragon used to be an evil tyrant named Emperor Kurr, who led a nomadic race of space aliens who had traveled through space for thousands of years, searching for a suitable new homeworld. After Kurr had chosen Earth, which was perfect for their needs, he decided to go against his people's peaceful ways and slaughter all humans. Two scientists named Rech and Weiko conspired against him.

Kurr had previously refused to father an heir, correctly believing that it would put his own power in jeopardy and thus killed all the females with whom he had sex. Weiko's daughter Geeta sacrificed herself by mating with him, allowing her father to recover a fertilized egg from her remains. With their people's future assured, the two scientists gave him brain damage that erased his memory, and implanted within his memories five days' worth of satellite television broadcasts from Earth, in order to give him some knowledge of Earth culture. Kurr was then sent to live on Earth, while his race moved on to search for a new planet elsewhere.

=== Death ===
In issue #225, during the battle against Darklord, Dragon sacrifices his life to stop him. The role of the Savage Dragon is taken over by his son Malcolm.

=== Move to Toronto ===
Malcolm and Maxine relocate to Toronto, Canada. Malcolm's half-brother Kevin enters into a sexual relationship with Maxine's mother, who becomes pregnant with his child.

=== Paul Dragon ===
In issue #250 it is shown that Paul Dragon's (the first Savage Dragon prototype) previous name showed up in the current universe as a replacement for the original Dragon.

== Characters ==
=== Supporting characters ===
- Alex Wilde – A female ex-police officer who was in a relationship with the Dragon.
- Malcolm Dragon – The son of the Dragon and Rapture who is currently the main character of the comics.
- Angel Murphy – The daughter of Smasher and step-daughter of the Dragon.
- Maxine Dragon – Malcolm's wife.
- Dart (Jill August) – She was a superhero prior to her death. Later on, her niece Alison Summers took up the role and the third Dart is her sister Jane August.
- Smasher (Jennifer Murphy) – The mother of Angel Murphy and one of the Dragon's love interests
- Rapture (Sharona Jackson) – The mother of Malcolm and one of Dragon's lovers.
- Mighty Man – a woman who can turn into a man with superpowers.
- The SuperPatriot – A Captain America analog, he is the father of Liberty & Justice.
- Liberty & Justice – Brother and sister team who are the children of the SuperPatriot.
- The Freak Force – a group of super-humans that often allies with the Dragon
- Vanguard – an alien superhero who often teams up with the Dragon.
- Horridus – a member of the Freak Force.
- The She-Dragon – a young woman who was mutated into a female counterpart to the Dragon.

=== Villains ===
- The Vicious Circle – the primary opponents for the Dragon.
- The Overlord – the original leader of the Vicious Circle and the original main villain of the series, as well as the Dragon's arch-enemy.
- Cyberface – one of the leaders of the Vicious Circle and the second main villain of the series.
- Abner Cavadar – one of the members of the vicious circle.
- The Horde – a member of the Vicious Circle.
- Brainape – a member of the Vicious Circle.
- Damien Darklord – the grandson of SuperPatriot and the third main villain of the series.
- Alice Summers – the niece of Dart and the second person to take up the mantle and later the leader of the Vicious Circle.
- Mr. Glum – an evil alien from Dimension X who becomes the fourth main antagonist of the series.
- The Scourge – a vigilante committed to assassinating costumed criminals.
- Solar Man – an evil parody of Superman.
- Universo – A giant alien who consumes planets.
- The Fiend – An evil demon spirit who possesses people.
- Thor – the God of Thunder.
- Mako I – a mutant sharkman
- Executioner / Mako II – a villain who was a member of The Vicious Circle but was abandoned to die and later becomes the second Mako.
- Samurai – A villain who became the new leader of the Vicious Circle.
- Covenant of the Sword – A group that was made by Darklord.

== Multimedia ==
- The Erik Larsen CD-Rom Comic Book Anthology (1995, Think Multimedia Entertainment) collected the Savage Dragon miniseries (#1–3) Savage Dragon #1–10, Freak Force #1–4, Vanguard #1–6, SuperPatriot #1–4, and The Savage Dragon Vs. Savage Megaton Man Special, plus Graphic Fantasy #1–2 and Megaton #3 (early independent comics featuring the Dragon)

== In other media ==
In 1995, the Savage Dragon appeared in The Savage Dragon, an animated television series as part of the Cartoon Express on the USA Network. Produced by Universal Cartoon Studios, it ran for 26 episodes from 1995 to 1996 and featured numerous supporting characters from the comic book series, including the She-Dragon, the Horde, Barbaric, Mako and the Overlord. The Dragon was voiced by Jim Cummings. Additional voices were provided by Mark Hamill, Michael Dorn, Jennifer Hale, René Auberjonois, Frank Welker, Dawnn Lewis, Paul Eiding, Peter Cullen, Rob Paulsen, Robert Ito and Tony Jay.

== Reception ==
The Savage Dragon was listed by Wizard as the 116th-greatest comic book character of all time. IGN also listed the Savage Dragon as the 95th-greatest comic book hero of all time.

== Collected editions ==
- The Savage Dragon (collects #1–3 of the original Savage Dragon miniseries, plus the Savage Dragon story from Image Comics #0 and other new material, with pages rearranged to appear in chronological order)
- Savage Dragon Volume 1: Baptism of Fire (reprints #1–5 of the Dragon miniseries, an expanded version of the original Savage Dragon miniseries with everything from the original collection plus new material)
- Savage Dragon Volume 2: A Force to Be Reckoned With (collects #1–6)
- Savage Dragon Volume 3: The Fallen (collects #7–11)
- Savage Dragon Volume 4: Possessed (collects #12–16 and WildC.A.T.s #14)
- Savage Dragon Volume 5: Revenge (collects #17–21)
- Savage Dragon Volume 6: Gang War (collects #22–26)
- Savage Dragon Volume 7: A Talk with God (collects #27–33)
- Savage Dragon Volume 8: Terminated (collects #34–40, #1/2)
  - Savage Dragon/Hellboy (collects #34–35)
- Savage Dragon Volume 9: Worlds at War (collects #41–46)
- Savage Dragon Volume 10: Endgame (collects #47–52)
- Savage Dragon Volume 11: Resurrection (collects #53–58)
- Savage Dragon Volume 12: Last Rites (collects #59–63)
- Savage Dragon Volume 13: Desperate Times (collects #64–69)
- Savage Dragon Volume 14: End of the World (collects #70–75)
- Savage Dragon Volume 15: This Savage World (collects #76–81)
- Savage Dragon Volume 16: The Wrath of Khan (collects #82–87)
- Savage Dragon Volume 17: Public Enemy No. 1 (collects #88–94)
- Savage Dragon Volume 18: The Choice (collects #95–100)
- Savage Dragon Volume 19: Parallel Lives (collects #101–106)
- Savage Dragon Volume 20: Danger in Dimension-X! (collects #107–112)
- Savage Dragon Volume 21: In the Center of the Crosshairs (collects #113–118)
- Savage Dragon Volume 22: A Dragon in the White House (collects #119–124) (ISBN 8892973185)
- Savage Dragon Volume 23: Wanted! (collects #125–130) (ISBN 8892973495)
- Savage Dragon Volume 24: Coast to Coast (collects #131–138)
- Savage Dragon Volume 25: United We Stand (collects #139–144) (August 2010) (ISBN 1607062968)
- Savage Dragon Volume 26: Back in Blue (collects #145–150) (January 2010) (ISBN 1607061848)
- Savage Dragon Volume 27: Identity Crisis (collects #151–156) (March 2010) (ISBN 1607062585)
- Savage Dragon Volume 28: Dragon War (collects #157–162) (November 2010) (ISBN 1607063239)
- Savage Dragon Volume 29: Emperor Dragon (collects #163–168) (April 5, 2011)
- Savage Dragon Volume 30: The Kids Are Alright (collects #169–174) (November 2011)
- Savage Dragon Volume 31: Invasion (collects #175–180) (September 2012)
- Savage Dragon Volume 32: On Trial (collects #181–186) (July 2013)
- Savage Dragon Volume 33: The End (collects #187–192) (February 2014) (ISBN 1607068508)
- Savage Dragon Volume 34: A New Beginning! (collects #193–198) (December 2014)
- Savage Dragon Volume 35: Changes (collects #199–204) (July 2015)
- Savage Dragon Volume 36: Growing Pains (collects #205–210) (March 2016)
- Savage Dragon Volume 37: Legacy (collects #211–216) (December 2016)
- Savage Dragon Volume 38: Warfare (collects #217–222) (June 14, 2017)
- Savage Dragon Volume 39: Merging of Multiple Earths (collects #223–227) (April 2018)
- Savage Dragon Volume 40: As Seen on TV (collects #228–234) (May 2019)
- Savage Dragon Volume 41: City Under Siege (collects #235–240) (August 2019)
- Savage Dragon Volume 42: The Scourge Strikes (collects #241–246) (July 15, 2020)
- Savage Dragon Volume 43: Family Matters (collects #247–252) (December 16, 2020)
- Savage Dragon Volume 44: The Vicious Circle Is Triumphant (collects #253–258) (February 9, 2022)
- Savage Dragon Volume 45: Into the Hornets' Nest (collects #259–264) (December 6, 2023)
- Savage Dragon Volume 46: Welcome to San Francisco (collects #265–272) (July 15, 2026)
- Savage Dragon: Team-Ups (collects Vanguard #3–4, Velocity #2 written by Kurt Busiek, Freak Force #10, Savage Dragon #13A by Jim Lee and Brandon Choi, #25's back-up story by Keith Giffen, Jeff Matsuda and Terry Austin, and #30)
- Twisted Savage Dragon Funnies (collects the back-ups from #160–171, plus some new stories) (July 2011)
- The Dragon: Blood & Guts (collects the three issue Blood & Guts miniseries)
- Savage Dragon Archives Volume 1 (collects #1–5 of the Dragon miniseries, #1–21 of the ongoing series, and WildC.A.T.s #14 in black-and-white)
- Savage Dragon Archives Volume 2 (collects #22–50 & #1/2 in black-and-white)
- Savage Dragon Archives Volume 3 (collects #51–75 in black-and-white)
- Savage Dragon Archives Volume 4 (collects #76–100 in black-and-white)
- Savage Dragon Archives Volume 5 (collects #101–125 in black-and-white)
- Savage Dragon Archives Volume 6 (collects #126–150 in black-and-white)
- Savage Dragon Archives Volume 7 (collects #151–175 in black-and-white)
- Savage Dragon Archives Volume 8 (collects #176–200 in black-and-white)
- Savage Dragon Archives Volume 9 (collects #201–225 in black-and-white)
- Savage Dragon Archives Volume 10 (collects #226–250 in black-and-white) (January 6, 2021)
- Savage Dragon Archives Volume 11 (collects #251-275 in black-and-white) (August 13, 2025)
- Savage Dragon: The Ultimate Collection Volume 1 (collects #1–5 of the Dragon miniseries, and #1–8 of the ongoing series) (December 13, 2022)
- Savage Dragon: The Ultimate Collection Volume 2 (collects #9–21 and WildC.A.T.s #14) (June 27, 2023)
- Savage Dragon: The Ultimate Collection Volume 3 (collects #22–35) (March 5, 2025)
