= Mighty Man (Image Comics) =

Publication information
- Publisher: Megaton Comics; Image Comics
- First appearance: Megaton #2 (October 1985); First Image appearance: The Savage Dragon #3 (October 1992)
- Created by: Erik Larsen

In-story information
- Alter ego: Robert Berman; Ann Samantha Stevens; Chelsea Nirvana; Jill August
- Team affiliations: Allied Supermen of America; The Allies; Freak Force; The Liberty League

Mighty Man is a superhero created by comics creator Erik Larsen. He has been a major character in Larsen's series The Savage Dragon (published by Image Comics) and its spin-off Freak Force, as well as in Gary Carlson's Big Bang Comics series. His first appearance was Megaton #2 (published by Megaton Comics), which was also the first appearance of the Savage Dragon.

== Fictional character biography ==
Mighty Man is an ancient entity created by a mysterious wizard named Fon~Ti to fight evil. The entity is passed from host to host at the point of death. The host, regardless of their sex, is able to transform into a tall blonde man with god-like powers, including flight and incredible strength. This is accomplished by tapping their wrists together. The Mighty Man entity cannot, however, sustain itself. In order to survive, the host must return to human form to sleep and eat.

Robert Berman is the Mighty Man entity's host from the 1940s until 1992. He uses the entity and its powers as a super-hero. For the first few years of his career, Berman is a teenager, working as a radio broadcaster. This is the Mighty Man who appears in Big Bang Comics. During World War II, Mighty Man first fights alongside SuperPatriot, who remains his lifelong friend and ally. During the fifties, they form another team, The Liberty League, with three other super-heroes; Mr. Big, Hornet and Battle Tank.

Over his years of heroism, Berman's Mighty Man builds up a rogues gallery like most others in his profession, most notably The Wicked Worm and Dr. Nirvana. Berman is killed in 1992 by a gang of ordinary thugs after a newspaper journalist learns and publishes his secret identity. While delirious and dying, Berman mistakes his nurse Ann Samantha Stevens for his grandson Billy and passes on the Mighty Man entity to her. This is the Mighty Man that appears in Savage Dragon.

Ann Samantha Stevens is unaware that Berman gave her the Mighty Man entity until she slips on a spillage in her home and accidentally taps her wrists together. After realizing the entity cannot sustain itself, she figures out how to change back and forth at will. When she has the powers and is unaware of it, she supervises the health of an amnesic 'superfreak' who was found in a burning field, and gives him the nickname 'the Dragon' because of his green skin and the prominent fin on his head. The Dragon likes her nickname and takes it as his legal name.

Stevens' first public appearance as Mighty Man is in Savage Dragon #3. They help save two other heroes, Dart (Jill August) and Star from an escaped group of super-powered prisoners.

The Dragon is skeptical about Mighty Man's return until they save him from the rampages of Mighty Man's old friend Superpatriot. Superpatriot is being controlled by Horde, a being made up of hundreds of copies of the entity known as Wicked Worm, combined with the wizard Fon~Ti.

When Ann's roommate, Phyllis Deeder, learns of her identity, she sexually propositions Ann while she is in male form. Ann rejects her, stating she 'wasn't that kind of person'.

Mighty Man joins the super-powered team of bounty hunters called Freak Force, but does not reveal her identity to them, or the Dragon, for some time. The actual identity of Mighty Man was a subject of much talk in the letter column. Her full origin appears in Freak Force #6. There, she defeats a powerful opponent in her human form and then explains everything to Superpatriot.

The daughter of Dr. Nirvana, Chelsea Nirvana, is a recurring villain in the Savage Dragon stories, and is the main villain of both Freak Force series. She scams her way into becoming the secretary for Freak Force. She then steals the powers of another villain, Johnny Redbeard. She then has the power to give other people super-powers. Chelsea's lover, Inhabitor, kills Redbeard, but this is after the creation of the tall, super-strong Bludgeon. This villain beats Mighty Man into a coma, where she/he stays until reverting to Ann Stevens.

The Freak Force series lasted from December 1993 to July 1995.

Ann Stevens uses her strength to help the Dragon when he healed incorrectly from a battle with the entity known as The Fiend. Her nursing knowledge allows her to break his bones in ways so that the Dragon's super-fast healing abilities re-mold them correctly.

Ann Stevens denies the Dragon's offer to join his new government team, Special Operations Strikeforce. She fears revealing her identity.

=== Death ===
Some time after Dragon's wife is seemingly murdered, he and Ann Stevens begin dating. Chelsea Nirvana, now in a man's body, manages to temporarily shape-shift into the Dragon. He shoots her to death, in the process stealing the form of Mighty Man. At Ann's funeral, Nirvana under the influence of the Wicked Worm attacks Dragon, but he dies from exhaustion. The powers pass to the now-legless Dart (Jill August). Naturally, as Mighty Man, Jill August enjoys her/his new legs.

=== New Ann ===
The Savage Dragon series is now set on an alternate Earth to the one on which it was set for its first 75 issues. The original Earth is destroyed in Savage Dragon issue #103 and everyone from that original Earth, with a few exceptions, is killed, including the Mighty Man of that world.

On this new Earth, Ann Stevens does not slip and does not realize she holds within her the power of Mighty Man. The lack of Mighty Man causes large changes in the history of that Earth. For instance, Mighty Man does not stop the jailbreak in Chicago and Dart is carried off to a remote tropical island by a villain named Mako and, as such, is never crippled or becomes Mighty Man herself. Avoiding the attentions of Chelsea Nirvana, Ann moves to Kansas City and is employed as a nurse.

While looking for allies to help him overthrow this new Earth's leader, Dragon shows Stevens what she can do. Dragon realizes Ann needs training. While she trains, Berman's nephew, the intended inheritor of the powers, gains the form of Mighty Man for a time, but he dies and the powers return to Ann. As Mighty Man, she joins the Liberty League. This group includes the Dragon, SuperPatriot and BattleTank. The group dissolves later.

She later tries to stop the Galactus-like Universo from draining energy from the planet.

Ann Stevens becomes pregnant and her child later gains Mighty Man's powers. After some destruction, Ann convinces her daughter to turn back and promises to guard her wrists so this would not happen again.

Mighty Man also appears in various issues of Invincible in a minor capacity, such as being a guest at the funeral of the Guardians of the Globe and participating in large battles.

== Inspiration ==
Mighty Man is heavily based on Captain Marvel. Erik Larsen was a big fan of the character as a child (and remains one today) and Savage Dragon and popular series villain Powerhouse also started out based on the hero. Mighty Man's enemies are also equally obvious pastiches of Captain Marvel's enemies Mr. Mind (The Wicked Worm) and Doctor Sivana (Dr. Nirvana). Mighty Man's old team The Liberty League, however, is based on Marvel's premiere Superhero team The Avengers, and the wrist-tapping transformation is reminiscent of the Nega-Bands of Marvel's Captain Marvel.

== Powers and abilities ==
Inheriting the Mighty Man entity allows the person to transform into a tall blonde man while still retaining their own personality, as well as being super-strong and being able to fly, Mighty Man is also bullet-proof and has enhanced durability though he is not totally impervious to harm.

== See also ==
- Vicious Circle
