= SuperPatriot =

- SuperPatriot #1

Publication information
- Publisher: Image Comics
- First appearance: Savage Dragon #1 (July 1992)
- Created by: Erik Larsen

In-story information
- Alter ego: John Quincy Armstrong
- Team affiliations: Allied Supermen of America; Liberty League; The Allies; Freak Force
- Abilities: Superhuman strength, agility, stamina and endurance Regenerative powers Telescopic/Microscopic/Night vision Decreased aging Flight via aid of unpleasant drug Cyborg limbs can stretch, and grow many types of guns and weaponry

SuperPatriot (John Quincy Armstrong) is an Image Comics superhero created by Erik Larsen in 1992. He regularly appears in Larsen's titles, whether in his own mini-series or as a supporting character and is currently a member of the Liberty League.

== Fictional character biography ==
SuperPatriot was once Johnny Armstrong, a soldier in World War II. Captured by the Germans, Armstrong was used as a guinea pig for scientific experiments and gained superhuman powers. He destroyed the base at which he was being kept so the Nazis could not replicate the process on their troops and donned an American flag-styled costume to become SuperPatriot. SuperPatriot later joined the superhero group called the Allies, working with such figures as Supreme and Mighty Man, and protected the innocent for many decades. He also worked with the World War II version of Die-Hard and Glory as the group 'Allies'. His World War II career also included a stint in Africa in 1943, chasing Rommel's 'Afrika Corps'.

However, in the 1990s, SuperPatriot was faced with more brutal and intense supervillains than ever before and began to have difficulty dealing with them. Eventually, he was overpowered by members of the Vicious Circle, a group of supervillains organized by Chicago crime-boss Overlord. SuperPatriot was savagely attacked by his foes, with the shark-man Mako biting off his limbs and much of his face. Left for dead, SuperPatriot's body was taken by Cyberdata, a corporation of subversive scientists, and transformed into a powerful cyborg.

Initially his transformation made him highly unstable and he embarked upon a violent spree of vigilante murders, clashing with the Savage Dragon. Superpatriot was easily controlled while in this addled state and was made into a puppet killing machine by terrorist groups like the Covenant of the Sword. Also, he was temporarily controlled by the entity known as the Horde. Fortunately, the SuperPatriot later regained his own mind and became a superhero again, joining the newly formed Chicago group called Freak Force.

During his time with the team he learns that his long-term friend Mighty Man died some time ago and the powers were now being wielded by his former nurse.

=== Two children ===
Sometime after being freed from Cyberdata and the Covenant of the Sword's control John learned that he had fathered two children. The twins (a boy and a girl) grew up to become Liberty & Justice. His ex-wife, who the twins and John thought dead, was revealed to be alive and was a member of the Covenant of the Sword prior to marrying John. His daughter also thinks the Covenant is not as bad as it is made out to seem.

SuperPatriot is well respected in the superhero community, becoming one of the main resistance leaders during the Mars Attacks The Image Universe crossover. He and the other leaders operate out of what seems to be a small suburban tract house, as most other military installations have been destroyed or are potential targets. During these events, his daughter is raped by Martians. She chooses to keep the child, which has far-reaching effects.

SuperPatriot cameos as part of the hero-only murder trial of Knightsabre. SuperPatriot's history in the Allied Supermen of America is explored in the Alan Moore run of Supreme.

=== Savage World ===
In the "Savage World", the alternate Earth depicted in Larsen's Savage Dragon series, SuperPatriot is controlled by Cyberface until his eventual downfall. Afterwards he rejoins the newly reestablished Liberty League. He has had various adventures, including meeting Claire Bono, and eventually marrying her.

Invincible, a newer Image character created by Robert Kirkman, has been depicted as a fan of SuperPatriot. Claire Bono, the executor of Omni-Man's will, is a friend and confidante to Invincible's mother, Debbie Grayson. They have bonded over their shared experiences of being married to superheroes. SuperPatriot is seen climbing up the side of Claire's building to talk with her about lunch, he states he has trouble going through security.

Superpatriot and the Savage Dragon are two of many heroes who later appear in the Invincible series. They are targeted by Doc Seismic and his army of monsters. Superpatriot and the other heroes were saved by a backup team led by the mysterious vigilante Darkwing. He again deals with Invincible's fallout when evil alternate universe versions of the hero threaten the world. Superpatriot works with several Chicago based heroes to try and defeat one of the doubles.

In SuperPatriot: War on Terror, John and Claire are trying to start their own family. John is living with survivors guilt as it is revealed that Liberty and Justice have been killed. The couple are successful and Claire gives birth to twins, a boy and girl. She wants to name them Libby and Justice in honor of their older half-siblings.

John later establishes himself as a Chicago crime fighter again. Other Chicago crime fighters include the reformed Neutron Bob, Daredevil, Kill-Cat, Kid Avenger and the teenaged children of Dragon. Dragon himself has gone mad, taking on the personality of a murderous alien conqueror.

Much later Superpatriot is seen again, working simple crime fighting. With the reluctant aid of Kid Avenger and the interference of Kill-Cat, he defeats the careless, dangerous Lightning Bug.

== Powers and abilities ==
Prior to becoming a cyborg SuperPatriot's body had the stamina, endurance, strength, and agility of ten peak human athletic men as well as slowed aging process. During World War II, SuperPatriot took a drug that allowed him to fly for a limited range, he discontinued the use of this drug due to its hallucinogenic side effects.

SuperPatriot's artificial eyes give him enhanced sight such as night vision, microscopic vision, and telescopic vision.

SuperPatriot's limbs have been replaced with nanite-powered cybernetic limbs, which obey his every mental command on a molecular level. When put to their most common use, his arms can assume the shape and function of any weapon he can think of so long as they retain its original mass. The ammunition for these weapons is, in most cases, stored elsewhere in his body and he can use actual components of his self-regenerating nanite-powered body. He can also reload with conventional ammo.

SuperPatriot's human form has an accelerated healing ability and as a cyborg, he is capable of lifting and pressing approximately 10 tons.

== See also ==
- Savage Dragon
- Freak Force
- Invincible
