= Erik Larsen =

American comic creator (born 1962)

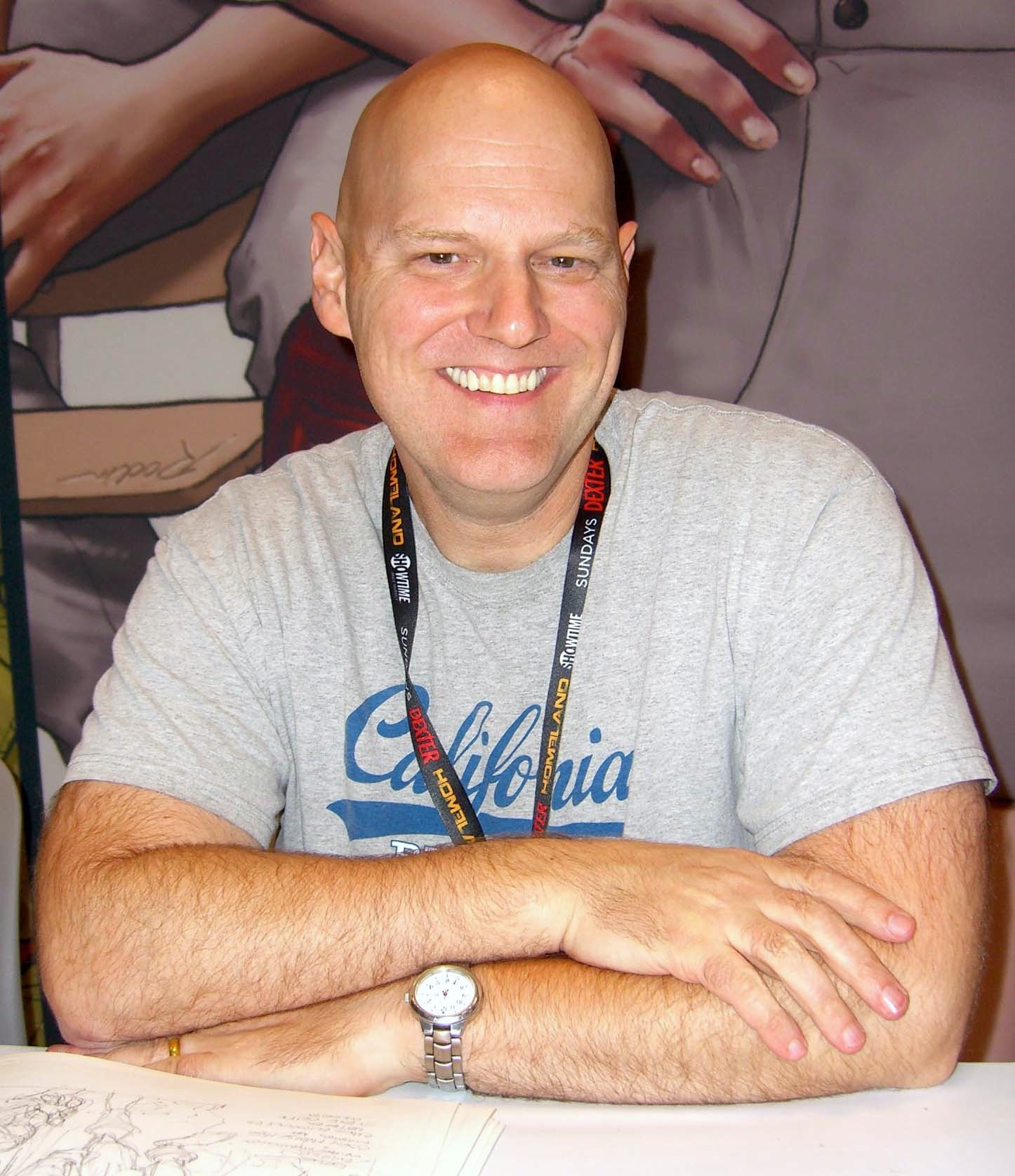
- Larsen at the 2011 New York Comic Con
- Born: Erik J. Larsen; December 8, 1962 (age 63) Minneapolis, Minnesota, U.S.
- Areas: Writer, Penciller, Inker, Publisher
- Notable works: The Amazing Spider-Man; Doom Patrol; Savage Dragon; Spawn; Spider-Man; Supreme

Erik J. Larsen (born December 8, 1962) is an American comic book artist, writer, and publisher. He currently acts as the chief financial officer of Image Comics. He gained attention in the early 1990s with his art on Spider-Man series for Marvel Comics. In 1992 he was one of several artists who stopped working for Marvel to found Image Comics, where he launched his superhero series Savage Dragon – one of the longest running creator-owned superhero comics series – and served for several years as the company's publisher.

== Early life ==
Larsen was born on December 8, 1962, in Minneapolis, Minnesota. He has one older brother and two younger sisters. Growing up in Bellingham, Washington, he became interested in comics through his father, a professor of English who read EC Comics, and owned a large collection of Captain Marvel Adventures. Through him, Larsen was exposed to those books and those of Marvel Comics, and began to buy comics in earnest in the mid-1970s. It was Larsen's exposure to Dick Sprang's rendition of Batman that would later influence the earliest incarnations of his own creation, The Dragon, who drove a car copied from Speed Racer's Mach Five, and who turned into a superhero using a magic word to trigger his powers like Captain Marvel.

== Career ==
=== Early career ===
About a decade after creating the Dragon, Larsen and two friends produced a fanzine called Graphic Fantasy, which featured this character.

For the anthology Megaton #1 (1983), Larsen co-created and illustrated a feature called "Vanguard" with publisher Gary Carlson. A revised version of the Dragon debuted in issue #2 and made a cameo appearance in the following two issues. The original Dragon, inspired by elements from Captain Marvel, Batman, Speed Racer and later The Incredible Hulk, differs greatly from the modern incarnation.

Savage Dragon was first featured in two issues of Graphic Fantasy, a self-published title with a small print run, published by Larsen and two friends. In this incarnation, the Dragon was a widower and a retired member of a government-sponsored superhero team. Subsequently, the Dragon made another appearance in the third issue of Gary Carlson's Megaton anthology in its Vanguard strip, which Larsen had been drawing. In these appearances, the character of the Dragon remained basically the same as it had been in Graphic Fantasy, with a few details modified (such as the inclusion of his wife, who was dead in his previous incarnation). Both the Graphic Fantasy and Megaton issues featuring the Dragon were later reprinted in high-quality editions.

In 1985 Larsen worked on Sentinels of Justice for AC Comics, and The DNAgents for Eclipse Comics.

By 1986, Larsen penciled scripts for the Renegade Press book Murder, which were written by Robin Snyder and Jim Senstrum, whom Larsen met because Snyder, like Larsen, lived in Bellingham, Washington, and frequented the same comics store.

=== DC Comics ===
Larsen did work at DC on The Outsiders, Teen Titans, Adventures of Superman and Doom Patrol. His art on Doom Patrol was negatively received by readers at first, something Larsen thought was due to his style being such a drastic departure from that of his predecessor on the series, Steve Lightle. He remarked, "Years later, I learned from the experience and made more of an effort to ease the transition." In 1998, he briefly wrote the series Aquaman.

=== Marvel Comics ===
His first work for Marvel Comics was a fill-in on Thor that was inked by Vince Colletta. He later did a fill-in issue of The Amazing Spider-Man and five issues of Punisher for Marvel. He then pitched to editor Terry Kavanaugh a story he would write and draw for Marvel Comics Presents featuring Nova, a character that Larsen adored. It was initially approved, but when it was found that it did not fit with an impending storyline in New Warriors, a team book in which Nova was a member, Larsen's series was cancelled. Larsen instead drew an "Excalibur" arc for Marvel Comics Presents, despite lacking interest in that group, because he needed work. This led to Larsen doing more Spider-Man work.

In 1990 Erik Larsen replaced Todd McFarlane on The Amazing Spider-Man with issue #329, having previously penciled issues 287, 324 and 327. With writer David Michelinie, Larsen illustrated stories such as "The Cosmic Spider-Man", "The Return of the Sinister Six" (#334–339) and "The Powerless Spider-Man" (#341–343). He left the title with #350, was succeeded by Mark Bagley with #351. Larsen again succeeded McFarlane on Spider-Man, where he wrote and drew the six-issue story arc "Revenge of the Sinister Six" (#18–23). Larsen also gained critical acclaim for his work with the character Venom during his time on Amazing Spider-Man. His design of Venom was highlighted during the story "Venom Returns" (#330–#333, #344–347, Annual #25), which introduced signature visual elements to the character such as giving Venom a long reptilian tongue dripping slime. Though his work with Venom was widely lauded and sales were strong, Larsen has gone on record saying he did not enjoy drawing the character and that he found the origin story of both Eddie Brock and the Venom symbiote to be unlikable.

Larsen stopped working for Marvel in 1992 (see below) but has occasionally returned to write and illustrate, on titles such as Fantastic Four, The Defenders, Wolverine and Nova. In 2000, he returned to pencil The Amazing Spider-Man vol. 2, issues #19–21 with writer Howard Mackie. In 2019, he penciled and wrote Amazing Spider-man: Going Big, a one-shot for Marvel's 80th anniversary, along with Mark Bagley and Gerry Conway.

In 2025, it was announced that Larsen was returning to Marvel to write a new Spider-Man Noir mini-series, with art by Andrea Broccardo.

=== Image Comics ===
In 1992, seeking greater control and profit over the work they created, Larsen and six other illustrators left Marvel to form Image Comics, where Larsen launched a series featuring a reworked version of Savage Dragon. This version was a massively muscled green amnesiac, who joined the Chicago police department after being discovered in a burning field. Initially debuting in a three-issue miniseries, the series met with enough success to justify a monthly series, launched in 1993. Larsen continued to write and illustrate the series entirely by himself, usually maintaining a roughly monthly schedule except during times when it was not in production.

As an Image partner, he formed the studio Highbrow Entertainment, which publishes through Image.

Savage Dragon is one of two original Image Comics titles still published (the other being Spawn) and the only one still written and drawn by its creator. The character was also adapted into a short-lived (26 episodes) USA Network animated series that started in 1995.

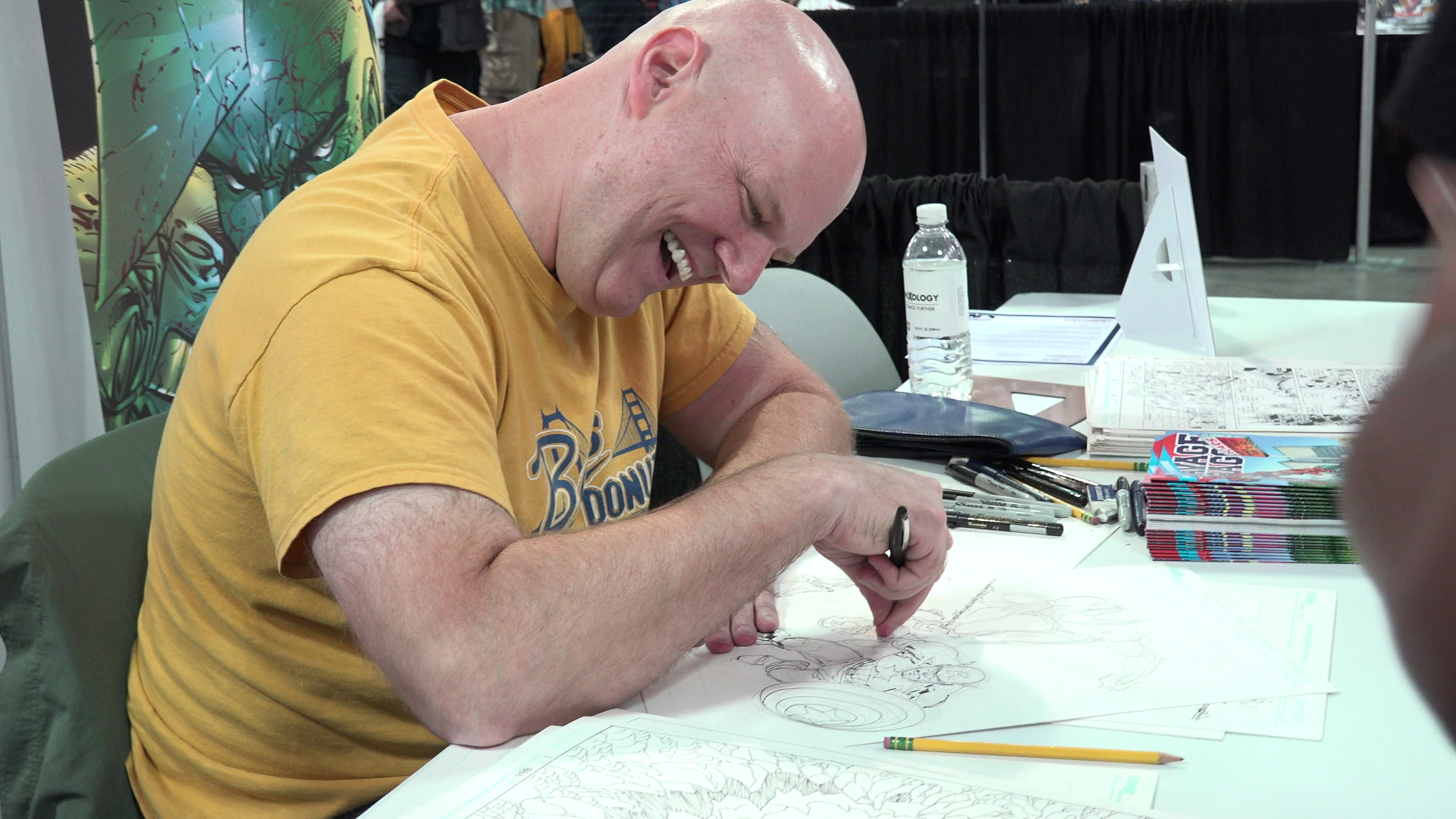
Erik Larsen in Artists Alley at New York Comic Con 2015

In 2004, Larsen replaced Jim Valentino as publisher of Image Comics, taking responsibility for all comics produced by creators other than the Image partners and their studios. Larsen stepped down as publisher in July 2008 and executive director Eric Stephenson was promoted to the position:

Fans wanted more Savage Dragon and I wanted to do more Savage Dragon—but it was not possible to be both a fulltime publisher and a fulltime cartoonist efficiently. Something had to give, and given the fact that Image was in a good place—going in the right direction—and Eric Stephenson was completely up to speed and ready to go—it seemed that the timing was right.

In 2012 and 2013, Larsen had a run as writer and artist on a short-lived revival of Rob Liefeld's Supreme, illustrating writer Alan Moore's final unpublished script with issue #63 and writing new stories from issues #64–68. Also in 2012, Erik Larsen purchased Mario Gully's character Ant. In 2015, Erik co-wrote and drew Spawn starting with Spawn #258 and ending with Spawn #266; this run was notable for having included a crossover with Savage Dragon and for featuring Gully's creation Ant. In June 2021, Larsen concluded the first volume of Gully's series Ant. In November 2021, Larsen launched a new Ant series, starting with a new first issue.

== Personal life ==
Larsen and his wife Jannie live in San Francisco, California, with their two sons, Christopher and Joseph.

In October 2022, Larsen said he would leave Twitter if Elon Musk bought the platform. In an email to NBC News, he said, "Yeah, I left. I said I would leave if Musk bought Twitter. Musk bought Twitter. So, I had no choice. The move only emboldened those most toxic users. The racists, 'patriots' and creeps are back in full force".

== Awards ==
In 2012, Larsen received an Inkpot Award from Comic-Con International.

Larsen was nominated for the 2016 Inkwell Awards All-in-One Award, for "Favorite artist known for inking his/ her own pencil work in award year interior, cover-dated, American comic book material." In 2017, he was again nominated and received the 2017 All-in-One Award for his work on Savage Dragon.

== Bibliography ==
=== As writer ===
==== DC Comics ====
- Aquaman #50–62
- Aquaman Secret Files #1

==== Marvel Comics ====
- The Defenders vol. 2 #1–12
- Fantastic Four: The World's Greatest Comics Magazine #1–12
- The Hulk #8
- Nova vol. 3 #1–7
- Spider-Man #15, 18–23
- Wolverine #133–149
- Spider-Man Noir (Vol. 3) #1-5

==== Image Comics ====
- Ant #12
- Deadly Duo vol. 1 #1–3
- Freak Force vol. 2 #1–3
- Negative Burn Anthology
- Savage Dragon vol. 1 #1–3 v2 #1–present
- Savage Dragon vs Savage Megaton Man
- Savage Dragon: Sex & Violence #1–2
- Spawn #259–266
- Supreme #64–68
- SuperPatriot #1–4
- WildC.A.T.s vol. 1 #14

=== As artist ===
==== DC Comics ====
- Adventures of Superman #431
- DC Secret Origins #13
- Doom Patrol #6–16
- Doom Patrol Annual #1
- Doom Patrol & Suicide Squad Special
- Legion of Superheroes #55
- Lobo's Greatest Hits
- Orion #6
- Outsiders vol. 2 #24, 27, 28
- Teen Titans #33
- Teen Titans Spotlight #10, 15

==== Marvel Comics ====
- The Amazing Spider-Man vol. 1 #287, 324, 327, 329–344, 346–350, vol. 2 #19–21
- Amazing Spider-Man Annual #25
- The Defenders vol. 2 #1–12
- Doctor Strange, Sorcerer Supreme #4
- Excalibur: Air Apparent
- Fantastic Four: The World's Greatest Comics Magazine #1, 5, 9, 12
- Guardians of the Galaxy vol. 1 #13
- The Incredible Hulk #346
- Marvel Comics Presents #31–38, 43, 48–50, 82–83, 138–142
- Marvel Super-Heroes vol. 2 #8
- Namor the Sub-Mariner Annual #1
- Peter Parker: Spider-Man vol. 2 #19
- Punisher #21–25
- Spider-Man #15, 18–23
- Spectacular Spider-Man Annual #11
- Spider-Woman #10
- Thor #385 vol. 2 #26–28
- X-51 #12
- X-Force #2–3

==== Image Comics ====
- 10th Muse #5
- Ant #12
- Desperate Times #1–4
- Image Illustrated #1
- Image United #1–3
- Negative Burn Anthology
- Savage Dragon vol. 1 #1–3, vol. 2 #1–present
- Savage Dragon vs Savage Megaton Man
- Savage Dragon Companion
- Savage Dragon/Destroyer Duck
- Shadowhawk #4
- Spawn #199, 258–266
- Splitting Image #1
- Supreme #63–68
- Teenage Mutant Ninja Turtles #1–23
- WildC.A.T.s vol. 1 #14
- Youngblood #1

==== As writer and artist ====
- The Amazing Spider-Man: Going Big #1

==== As editor ====
- Deadly Duo vol. 2 #1–4
- Freak Force vol. 1 #1–18
- Savage Dragon: Red Horizon #1–3
- Savage Dragon/Destroyer Duck
- Star #1–4
- SuperPatriot: Liberty & Justice #1–4
- Vanguard #1–6
- Vanguard: Strange Visitors #1–4

==== Publisher ====
- Dart (1996)
- Deadly Duo (1994–1995)
  - Deadly Duo vol. 2 (1995)
- Freak Force (1993–1995)
  - Freak Force vol. 2 (1997)
- Dragon: Blood & Guts (1995)
- Savage Dragon (1992)
  - Savage Dragon vol. 2 (1993–ongoing)
- Savage Dragon/Marshal Law (1997)
- Savage Dragon: Red Horizon (1997)
- Savage Dragon: Sex and Violence (1997)
- Savage Dragon: God War (2004–2005)
- Star (1995)
- SuperPatriot (1993)
  - SuperPatriot: Liberty & Justice (1995)
  - SuperPatriot: America's Fighting Force (2002)
  - SuperPatriot: War on Terror (2004–2005)
- The Dragon (1996)
- Teenage Mutant Ninja Turtles (1996–1999)
- Vanguard (1993–1994)
  - Vanguard: Strange Visitors (1996–1997)

Preceded by Todd McFarlane	The Amazing Spider-Man artist 1990–1991	Succeeded by Mark Bagley
Preceded by Todd McFarlane	Spider-Man writer-artist 1991–1992	Succeeded by Howard Mackie (writer); Larry Alexander (artist)
Preceded by Todd DeZago	Wolverine writer 1999–2000	Succeeded by Steve Skroce
