= Occupy Comics =

Comic book anthology series

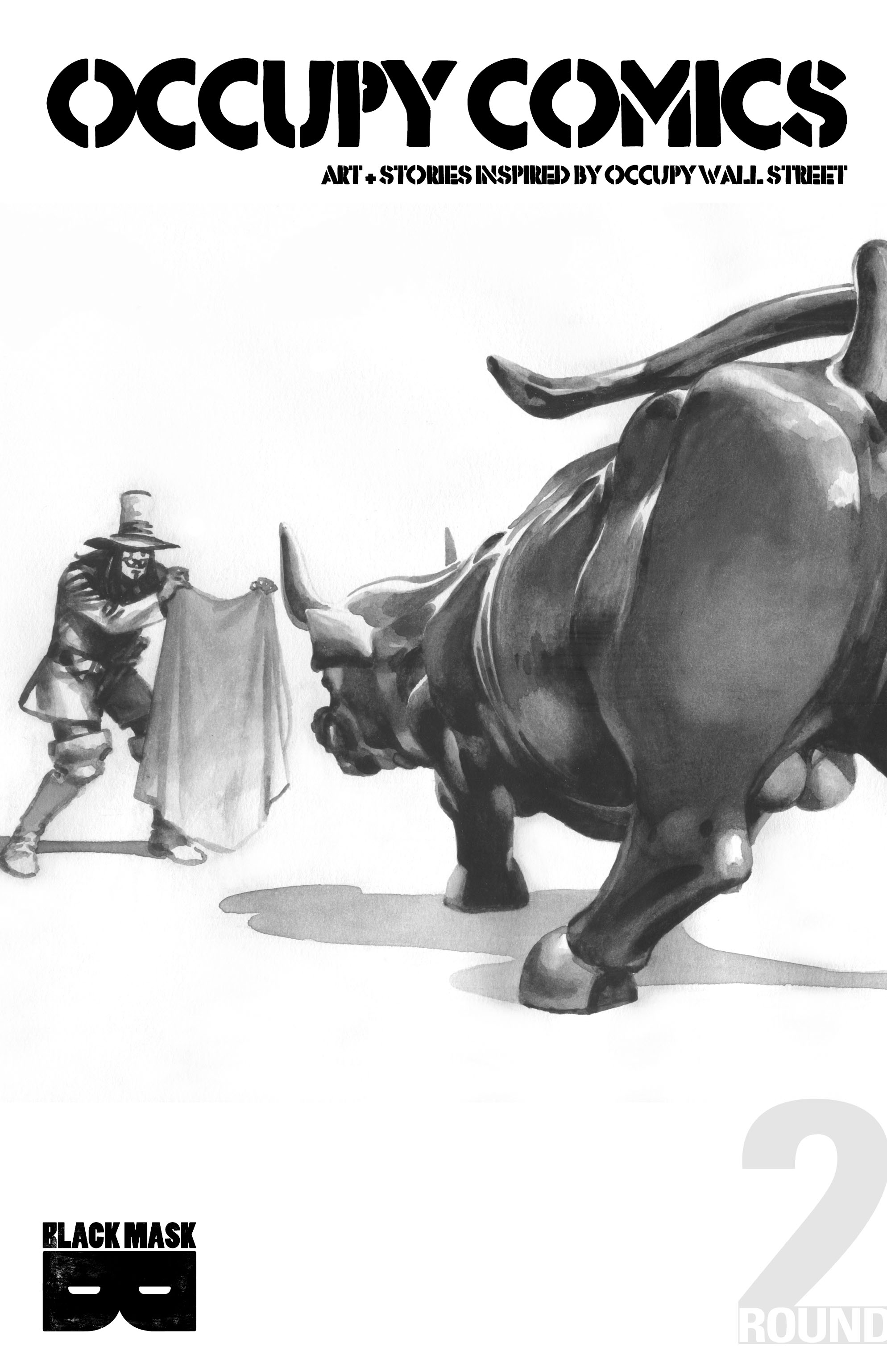
- Cover of Occupy Comics #2. Art by David Lloyd.

Publication information
- Publisher: Black Mask Studios
- Publication date: May–August 2013
- No. of issues: 3
- Editor: Matt Pizzolo

Occupy Comics: Art & Stories Inspired by Occupy Wall Street is a three-issue comic book anthology series published by Black Mask Studios in 2013. Funded on Kickstarter, the series articulates themes of the Occupy Wall Street movement through comics as well as fund-raises on behalf of the protesters.

As Bleeding Cool described it:

Some of the biggest names in independent and mainstream comics have come together for a social-networking funded comic book anthology to tell the story of the Occupy Wall Street protest that sidesteps the 24-hour news media's desire for sensationalism. The money raised will pay the creators for their work – and they will then donate all that money to the Occupy movement, especially through the coming winter months.

Wired explained the perceived relationship between Occupy Wall Street and art:

Pizzolo said the project makes sense because the Occupy Wall Street movement was launched by a piece of art. "Adbusters created a really powerful image of a ballerina atop the Wall Street Bull with protesters in the background, and that was enough to set this off," he said. "Then Anonymous brought in the Guy Fawkes masks, and U.S. Day of Rage created more art challenging the relationship between Wall Street and Washington. So this is an art-inspired movement, and that's part of what makes it so viral. It's not intellectual, it doesn't need a manifesto. People are banding together around an idea, rather than an ideology."

== History ==
=== Mission ===
The project was officially announced by organizational spearhead Matt Pizzolo in Wired Magazine on October 13, 2011, several weeks after the occupation of Zuccotti Park began on September 17, 2011.

According to Wired:

Pizzolo's Occupy Comics was originally designed to bring public awareness to the Occupy Wall Street movement. But a combination of growing protests, as well as possibly illegal police pushback, solved the exposure gap. Now Pizzolo is interested in providing illustrative and material support to protesters through a Kickstarter project whose contributors would donate all proceeds to the Wall Street occupiers. "I think it's cool to expand the Occupy movement out of physical spaces and into abstract spaces like comics, so its culture can start occupying shared mindspaces as well as cities," Pizzolo said. "The occupation has to be as pervasive and immersive as possible."

=== Kickstarter campaign ===
Occupy Comics launched on Kickstarter November 9, 2011 with a minimum funding goal of US$10,000 and a roster of 30 professional artists and writers, including Charlie Adlard, Marc Andreyko, Kevin Colden, Molly Crabapple, J.M. DeMatteis, Joshua Dysart, Brea Grant, Joe Keatinge, George Krstic, Joseph Michael Linsner, B. Clay Moore, Steve Niles, Laurie Penny, Matt Pizzolo, Steve Rolston, Riley Rossmo, Douglas Rushkoff, Tim Seeley, Simon Spurrier, and Ben Templesmith.

Shortly after the Kickstarter campaign launched, Wired released a follow-up article which explained the project's funding goals and strategy:

What do we want? Funding! How will we get it? Comics!

That's the goal of the Occupy Comics Kickstarter project... The plan is to graphically document the Occupy movement with the help of a roster of respected comics creators and artists, then funnel the proceeds directly to the protesters taking hits and making history for the 99 percent.

"Comics is at the root of this thing," Halo-8 founder and Occupy Comics organizer Matt Pizzolo said in an e-mail to Wired.com. "Just look at Alan Moore and David Lloyd's V for Vendetta masks at every protest. A Guy Fawkes mask is now a more iconic image of street protest than a gas mask."

Occupy Comics contributor Molly Crabapple ... lives a block from Zuccotti Park, where the Occupy Wall Street movement got its start. She said she visits the site, where hundreds of people have encamped to protest economic inequality, almost daily.

"It's a beautiful community, almost a mini-city, complete with library, kitchen, free store, coffee, compost and Ben and Jerry's ice cream scooped out by Ben himself," Crabapple told Wired.com in an e-mail. "But the media wasn't portraying this. So I started drawing the protesters to show the diversity down at Zuccotti. Later, I did more blatantly political work in response to attacks on unions and police brutality in Oakland."

Occupy Comics overall plan is pretty simple, which is how Pizzolo wants to keep it, in the interests of transparency. But some workarounds have been needed. "You can't fund-raise for charity on Kickstarter; you can only use it to fund a creative project," Pizzolo said. "So Kickstarter itself is funding the creation of a hardcover anthology graphic novel about the protests, and through that everyone is being paid, then donating their pay to the protesters."

Early in the campaign, the project got an unexpected boost when Frank Miller attacked Occupy Wall Street in a controversial and polarizing blog post.

As the campaign closed in on its funding goal, 13 additional contributors were added to the roster, including Vito Delsante, Dan Goldman, Amanda Palmer, Darick Robertson, Mark Sable, and Salgood Sam.

The campaign passed its funding goal and was guaranteed its budget on November 20, 2011, 11 days in on its 30-day funding period.

Shortly after passing its funding goal, six additional contributors were added to the roster, including Mike Allred, Shannon Wheeler, Eric Drooker, Ryan Ottley, Dean Haspiel, Guy Denning, and David Lloyd.

In the final week of its Kickstarter campaign, Alan Moore joined the roster.

Although not an official reunion, the participation of Alan Moore and David Lloyd was considered significant to many observers of the Occupy movement, as the duo's V for Vendetta originated the Guy Fawkes mask that has become emblematic of the movement. Moore and Lloyd have not worked together since V for Vendetta was completed in 1989.

Alan Moore further boosted Occupy Comics' profile when, during an interview with Honest Publishing, he responded to Frank Miller's attack on the Occupy movement. The conflict led to mainstream news coverage of Occupy Comics in The Huffington Post, Deadline Hollywood, MTV, Entertainment Weekly.

On December 9, 2011, the Occupy Comics Kickstarter campaign ended with $28,640 raised from 715 backers, earning 286% of its funding goal.

=== Public release and formation of Black Mask Studios ===
On March 20, 2012, it was announced that Occupy Comics would not be released through an existing comic book publisher, instead a new company called Black Mask Studios would be formed to release the project.

According to Comic Book Resources:

"Initially I was hoping we could partner with a publisher or retailer to work with us on distribution, but we weren't happy with any of the deals we were offered," said Pizzolo on the project's Kickstarter site. "So instead I decided to invent a solution we'd be happy with, and it wound up seeming like a pretty cool way to support comics creators in general."

Wired reported that Steve Niles (30 Days of Night) and Brett Gurewitz (guitarist-songwriter Bad Religion, owner Epitaph Records) joined with Pizzolo to found Black Mask:

The mainstream comics industry has spawned another alternative supergroup. 30 Days of Night creator Steve Niles and Epitaph Records owner and Bad Religion guitarist Brett Gurewitz have banded together with Halo-8′s Matt Pizzolo to form Black Mask Studios with the stated aim of disrupting the comics market.

"It's become this monopolized walled garden where you're only allowed to grow two things: superheroes and movie treatments," Pizzolo told Wired via e-mail. "We're going to open new space outside the entrenched market where we can cultivate more subversive experimental and literary comics to reach broader audiences."

Inspired by the controversial but influential 1960s anarchists Up Against the Wall Motherfuckers and Edgar Allan Poe's class-conscious gothic short The Masque of the Red Death, Black Mask Studios was teased Sunday during WonderCon's spotlight panel on Niles, who serves as creative director. Pizzolo runs the biz as president, and Gurewitz's Epitaph Records empowers the indie operation.

"Comics and punk have a lot in common, being transgressive art forms with under-appreciated potential for social influence," Gurewitz said in an e-mail to Wired. "Black Mask Studios might be disruptive, in a really good way, for both artists and fans."

"I'm really excited about this project," Niles told Wired via e-mail. "Since the advent of the direct market and the disappearance of the spinner rack, I've watched comics sales fall due to lack of exposure."

On June 12, 2012, Black Mask Studios opened its webstore and officially released Occupy Comics #1 with the announcement that Pulitzer Prize-winner Art Spiegelman, Bill Ayers, Ryan Alexander-Tanner, Jimmy Palmiotti, and Matt Bors had joined the Occupy Comics roster.

Spiegelman told Wired:

"I'm proud to be included in this book," Spiegelman told Wired by email. "Occupy is the seismograph of things to come."

"Occupy is one of the most significant things happening that could actually bring hope and change to our ravaged nation."

On September 17, 2012, the one-year anniversary of Occupy Wall Street, Occupy Comics #2 was released to the project's Kickstarter backers and via the Black Mask Studios website. The cover featured a new and iconic illustration by V for Vendetta artist David Lloyd pitting his seminal character V against the Wall Street Charging Bull.

Lloyd told Wired:

"I was massively impressed by the great camaraderie and strength of will [the Occupy movement] showed in New York last October when I went to see what they were doing, and I hope that they can somehow survive all the blows they've suffered since then… They've got a hard job to do and it's not going to get any easier."

== Contributors ==
- Charlie Adlard (The Walking Dead)
- Ryan Alexander-Tanner (To Teach: The Journey, in Comics)
- Mike Allred (Madman)
- Marc Andreyko (Manhunter)
- Bill Ayers (co-founder Weather Underground, To Teach: The Journey, in Comics)
- Matt Bors (War Is Boring)
- Susie Cagle (Notes on Conflict, arrested at Occupy Oakland)
- Mike Cavallaro (Parade (with Fireworks), The Life and Times of Savior 28)
- Kevin Colden (I Rule the Night, Grimm's Fairy Tales)
- Molly Crabapple (Dr. Sketchy's)
- Tyler Crook (Petrograd, B.P.R.D.)
- Vito Delsante (Superman, FCHS)
- J.M. DeMatteis (Justice League, Spider-Man: Kraven's Last Hunt, Imaginalis)
- Guy Denning (painter)
- Eric Drooker (Flood!)
- Joshua Dysart (Swamp Thing, The Unknown Soldier)
- Zoetica Ebb (Biorequiem)
- Joshua Hale Fialkov (I, Vampire, Echoes)
- Allen Gladfelter (Cars (comics), Penguins of Madagascar (comics), Strongman, Intrepid Events Presents]])
- Dan Goldman (Shooting War, 08: A Graphic Diary of the Campaign Trail)
- Jenny "Devildoll" Gonzalez-Blitz (Coffin Factory art collective)
- Brea Grant (We Will Bury You, SuicideGirls comic)
- Zane Grant (We Will Bury You, SuicideGirls comic)
- Joe Harris (Ghost Projekt, Spontaneous)
- Dean Haspiel (American Splendor)
- Megan Hutchison (An Aurora Grimeon Story: Will-O-the-Wisp)
- Joe Keatinge (Hell Yeah, Glory, Brutal)
- Ales Kot (upcoming projects w/ Image Comics & DC Ent)
- George Krstic (Star Wars: The Clone Wars, Megas XLR)
- Jonathan Swifty Lang (Feeding Ground)
- Joseph Michael Linsner (Dawn)
- David Lloyd (V for Vendetta)
- Patrick Meaney (Grant Morrison: Talking with Gods)
- Mark L. Miller (Luna, Nanny & Hank)
- Caleb Monroe (Batman: Fearless, Hunter's Fortune)
- Alan Moore (V for Vendetta, Watchmen, League of Extraordinary Gentlemen, From Hell, Promethea)
- B. Clay Moore (Hawaiian Dick, Superman Confidential)
- Jerem Morrow (Drive-In Horrorshow, Kingdom Suicide)
- Amancay Nahuelpan-Bustamante (Hijos de P)
- Steve Niles (30 Days of Night, Batman: Gotham County Line, Criminal Macabre)
- Ryan Ottley (Invincible)
- Amanda Palmer (The Dresden Dolls)
- Jimmy Palmiotti (The Pro, Jonah Hex)
- Laurie Penny (Penny Red)
- Matt Pizzolo (Godkiller)
- Darick Robertson (Transmetropolitan, The Boys)
- Steve Rolston (Ghost Projekt, Queen & Country)
- Riley Rossmo (Proof, Cowboy Ninja Viking)
- Douglas Rushkoff (Testament, media theorist)
- Mark Sable (Two-Face: Year One, Rift Raiders, Unthinkable)
- Salgood Sam (Dream Life, RevolveR One, Revolution on the Planet of the Apes)
- Tim Seeley (Hack/Slash, Witchblade)
- Art Spiegelman (Maus)
- Simon Spurrier (2000 AD, X-Men: Curse of the Mutants)
- Ben Templesmith (30 Days of Night, Fell)
- Shannon Wheeler (Too Much Coffee Man)
- Anna Wieszczyk (Godkiller, Lucid)
- Ronald Wimberly (MF GRIMM: Sentences)
