= Ivan Brandon =

Writer

- Born: 1976 (age 49–50) New York City
- Areas: Writer, Editor

Ivan Brandon (born 1976) is a comic book writer known for his work on titles such as DC Comics' Final Crisis Aftermath: Escape and Men of War as well as creator-owned series Viking, The Cross Bronx and NYC Mech, published by Image Comics. He is also the creator and producer of the Eisner-nominated anthology series 24Seven.

== Early life ==
Ivan Brandon was born in New York City in 1976 to Cuban immigrants. He has an older brother, two younger brothers and a younger sister. Brandon's earliest exposure to comics came in the early 1980s, from the books that were passed down to him from his older brother, including such Marvel publications as Daredevil, The Amazing Spider-Man, Uncanny X-Men and Secret Wars. Brandon names Bill Sienkiewicz's work on New Mutants and Frank Miller's work on Daredevil and Elektra as having had an influential impact on him.

Brandon studied art under David Mazzucchelli, and has stated that he made his first comics with him at age 10.

== Career ==
Brandon got his start at Beckett Comics, providing scripts for two series created by the company's founder Jeff Amano, Gene-Fusion and Ruule, as well as writing the first two issues of the Terminator 3 prequel series. Most of Brandon further body of work consists of creator-owned projects such as The Cross Bronx, a supernatural crime story produced with Michael Avon Oeming, NYC Mech with co-writer Miles Gunter and artist Andy MacDonald, and 24Seven, an anthology series that Brandon created and edited. April 2009 saw the debut of Viking, an Image Comics series based on Viking history about two young brothers attempting to work their way up the criminal food chain. Brandon stated that he was inspired by period dramas such as Hiroaki Samura's Blade of the Immortal and the parallels he perceived between Viking history and organized crime.

Also in 2009, Brandon started writing for DC Comics with Final Crisis Aftermath: Escape. For DC Comics' 2011 company-wide title relaunch The New 52, Brandon wrote Men of War, which lasted eight issues before its cancellation.

== Bibliography ==
=== Early work ===
- Beckett Comics:
  - Gene-Fusion A.D. 2310 #1–4 (with Neil Vokes, 2003)
  - Terminator 3 #1–2: "Before the Rise" (with Goran Parlov, 2003)
  - Ruule: Ganglords of Chinatown #1–5 (with Mike Hawthorne, 2003–2004) collected as Ruule: Ganglords of Chinatown (tpb, 224 pages, 2005, ISBN 1-58240-566-2)
- More Fund Comics: An All-Star Benefit Comic for the CBLDF: "Cookies and Milk" (with Andy MacDonald, anthology graphic novel, 144 pages, Sky Dog, 2003, ISBN 0-9721831-2-4)

=== Image Comics ===
- NYC Mech (co-written by Brandon and Miles Gunter, art by Andy MacDonald):
  - NYC Mech #1–6 (with additional art by James Romberger in issue #6, 2004) collected as NYC Mech: Let's Electrify (tpb, 160 pages, 2005, ISBN 1-58240-558-1)
  - NYC Mech: Beta Love #1–6 (2005–2006) collected as NYC Mech: Beta Love (tpb, 160 pages, 2007, ISBN 1-58240-889-0)
  - Image! #11: "Dead Again" (anthology, 2023)
- Grounded #1–6 (as "editor"; written by Mark Sable, drawn by Paul Azaceta, 2005–2006)
- 24Seven (as creator and editor, series of anthology graphic novels):
  - Volume 1 (224 pages, 2006, ISBN 1-58240-636-7) featured several stories written by Brandon:
    - "Last Stop" (with Eduardo Risso)
    - "Transit" (with Jeff Amano)
    - "Perro" (with Alex Maleev)
    - "Flush" (with Dan Panosian)
    - "Drag" (with Eric Canete)
  - Volume 2 (240 pages, 2007, ISBN 1-58240-846-7) featured two stories written by Brandon:
    - "Getaway" (with Calum Alexander Watt)
    - "Little Nano in Alphaland" (with Gene Ha)
- The Cross Bronx #1–4 (with Michael Avon Oeming, 2006) collected as The Cross Bronx (tpb, 128 pages, 2007, ISBN 1-58240-690-1)
- Crimeland (story by Felipe Ferreira, dialogue by Brandon, art by Rafael Albuquerque, graphic novel, 96 pages, 2007, ISBN 1-58240-847-5)
- Fear Agent #10: "Wild Goose" (with Rafael Albuquerque, co-feature, 2007)
  - Collected in Fear Agent Library Edition Volume 1 (hc, 440 pages, Dark Horse, 2012, ISBN 1-61655-005-8)
  - Collected in Fear Agent: The Final Edition Volume 4 (tpb, 248 pages, 2018, ISBN 1-5343-0875-X)
- Comic Book Tattoo: "Pirates" (with Calum Alexander Watt, anthology graphic novel, hc, 480 pages, 2008, ISBN 1-58240-965-X; sc, 2008, ISBN 1-58240-964-1)
- Viking #1–5 (with Nic Klein, 2009–2010) collected as Viking: The Long Cold Fire (hc, 144 pages, 2010, ISBN 1-60706-170-8; sc, 2011, ISBN 1-60706-169-4)
- Outlaw Territory Volume 1: "The First Car in Mexico" (with Andy MacDonald, anthology graphic novel, 240 pages, 2009, ISBN 1-60706-004-3)
- The Crazies #1: "Hopman Bog" (with Jon Buran and Chris DiBari, Top Cow, 2010)
- Thought Bubble Anthology #2: "I'm Through" (with Leigh Gallagher, 2012) collected in Thought Bubble Anthology Collection (tpb, 136 pages, 2016, ISBN 1-5343-0067-8)
- Drifter (with Nic Klein, 2014–2017) collected as:
  - Out of the Night (collects #1–5, tpb, 128 pages, 2015, ISBN 1-63215-281-9)
  - The Wake (collects #6–9, tpb, 104 pages, 2015, ISBN 1-63215-501-X)
  - Lit by Fire (collects #10–14, tpb, 128 pages, 2016, ISBN 1-63215-706-3)
  - Remains (collects #15–19, tpb, 120 pages, 2017, ISBN 1-5343-0187-9)
- Black Cloud (co-written by Brandon and Jason Latour, art by Greg Hinkle, Paul Reinwand (#6) and Saumin Patel (#9–10), 2017–2018) collected as:
  - No Exit (collects #1–5, tpb, 128 pages, 2017, ISBN 1-5343-0328-6)
  - No Return (collects #6–10, tpb, 128 pages, 2018, ISBN 1-5343-0669-2)
- VS #1–5 (with Esad Ribić, 2018) collected as VS, Volume 1 (tpb, 144 pages, 2018, ISBN 1-5343-0693-5)
- Where We Live: A Benefit for the Survivors in Las Vegas: "N-R-Yay" (with Paul Azaceta, anthology graphic novel, 336 pages, 2018, ISBN 1-5343-0822-9)

=== Marvel Comics ===
- Secret Invasion: Home Invasion #1–8 (with Nick Postic, digital, 2008) collected as Secret Invasion: Home Invasion (tpb, 104 pages, 2009, ISBN 0-7851-3557-X)
- Marvel Comics Presents vol. 2 #8–12: "Machine Man" (with Niko Henrichon, anthology, 2008)
- Nation X #4: "Ice Ceam Alamo" (with Rael Lyra, anthology, 2010) collected in X-Men: Nation X (hc, 360 pages, 2010, ISBN 0-7851-3873-0; tpb, 2010, ISBN 0-7851-4103-0)
- Deadpool Team-Up #894 (with Sanford Greene, 2010) collected in Deadpool Team-Up: Good Buddies (hc, 176 pages, 2010, ISBN 0-7851-4528-1; tpb, 2010, ISBN 0-7851-4529-X)
- Wolverine #309: "Underneath" (with Rafael Albuquerque and Jason Latour, 2012) collected in Wolverine: Rot (hc, 128 pages, 2012, ISBN 0-7851-6145-7; tpb, 2013, ISBN 0-7851-6146-5)
- Secret Wars: Battleworld #3: "A Thousand Cuts" (with Aaron Conley, anthology, 2015) collected in Secret Wars Journal/Battleworld (tpb, 248 pages, 2016, ISBN 0-7851-9580-7)

=== DC Comics ===
- Faces of Evil: Kobra (with Julian López, one-shot, 2009) collected in Kobra: Resurrection (tpb, 144 pages, 2010, ISBN 1-4012-2655-8)
- Final Crisis Aftermath: Escape #1–6 (with Marco Rudy (#1–3) and Cliff Richards (#4–6), 2009) collected as Final Crisis Aftermath: Escape (tpb, 144 pages, 2010, ISBN 1-4012-2608-6)
- Nemesis: The Impostors #1–4 (with Cliff Richards, 2010)
- Batman: Streets of Gotham #14–16: "The Long Way Down" (with Ramon Bachs, co-feature, 2010)
- Weird War Tales: "The Hell Above Us" (with Nic Klein, anthology one-shot, 2010) collected in Our Army at War (tpb, 128 pages, 2011, ISBN 1-4012-3015-6)
- Doc Savage vol. 5 #6–12 (co-written by Brandon and Brian Azzarello, art by Nic Klein, James Harren (#8–9) and Phil Winslade (#10), First Wave, 2010–2011)
- JSA 80-Page Giant 2011: "The Perfect Score" (with Nic Klein, anthology one-shot, 2011)
- Men of War vol. 2 #1–6 (with Tom Derenick, 2011–2012) collected in Men of War: Uneasy Company (tpb, 256 pages, 2012, ISBN 1-4012-3499-2)
- Batman: Black and White vol. 2 #5: "Hell Night" (with Paolo Rivera, anthology, 2014) collected in Batman: Black and White Volume 4 (hc, 288 pages, 2014, ISBN 1-4012-4643-5; tpb, 2015, ISBN 1-4012-5062-9)
- Strange Sports Stories vol. 2 #1: "Refugees" (with Amei Zhao, anthology, Vertigo, 2015) collected in Strange Sports Stories (tpb, 144 pages, 2015, ISBN 1-4012-5864-6)

=== Other publishers ===
- IDW Publishing:
  - Masters of Horror #3–4: "Dreams in the Witch-House" (adaptation of the teleplay; script by Brandon, art by Dennis Calero, anthology, 2006) collected in Masters of Horror (tpb, 104 pages, 2006, ISBN 1-60010-016-3)
  - Doomed #3–4: "David J. Schow's Visitation" (adaptation of the short story; script by Brandon, art by Andy MacDonald, anthology, 2006) collected in Completely Doomed (tpb, 240 pages, 2007, ISBN 1-60010-078-3)
  - Gene Simmons' House of Horrors #2: "Last Meal" (with Jeff Zornow, anthology, 2007) collected in Gene Simmons' House of Horrors (tpb, 192 pages, 2008, ISBN 1-60010-209-3)
  - Love is Love (untitled one-page prose story with an illustration by Paul Reinwand, anthology graphic novel, 144 pages, 2016, ISBN 1-63140-939-5)
- The Toxic Avenger and Other Tromatic Tales: "I Heart Tromaville" (with Andy MacDonald, anthology graphic novel, 160 pages, Devil's Due, 2007, ISBN 1-932796-90-8)
- The Way of Shadows: The Graphic Novel (adaptation of the novel by Brent Weeks; script by Brandon, art by Andy MacDonald, 224 pages, Yen Press, 2014, ISBN 0-316-21298-9)
- Spitball: A CCAD Comics Anthology #1: "Labyrinth" (with Alissa Sallah, Columbus College of Art and Design, 2015)
- Frontlines: Requiem #1–4 (with Gary Erskine, Jet City Comics, 2016) collected as Frontlines: Requiem (tpb, 112 pages, 2016, ISBN 1-5039-3811-5)
