= Machete Squad =

2018 graphic novel memoir

- First edition
- Author: Brent Dulak; David Axe; Kevin Knodell; Per Berg (illustrator)
- Genre: Graphic novel; Memoir
- Published: 2018 (Dead Reckoning)
- ISBN: 978-1-68247-100-5

Machete Squad is a 2018 graphic novel memoir written by Brent Dulak and co-contributors about his time as a U.S. Army medic in Afghanistan. The book was published by Dead Reckoning, an imprint of Naval Institute Press, and was contributed to by David Axe, Kevin Knodell, and illustrator Per Berg.

The book has received reviews from publications including Publishers Weekly, Kirkus Reviews, Foreword Reviews, Comics Bulletin, Comicon.com, Military Times, Midwest Book Review, and Las Vegas Review-Journal.
