= We Will Bury You (disambiguation) =

We Will Bury You, an infamous quote by Soviet Premier Nikita Khrushchev.

We Will Bury You may also refer to:

- We Will Bury You, a 2010 zombie comic book miniseries by Brea Grant and Zane Grant
- We Will Bury You: The Soviet Plan for the Subversion of the West by the Highest Ranking Communist Ever to Defect, a 1963 book by Jan Šejna
- We Will Bury You: Studies in Left Wing Subversion Today, a 1970 book by Brian Crozier
