= Project Negin =

Upcoming Iranian class of warship

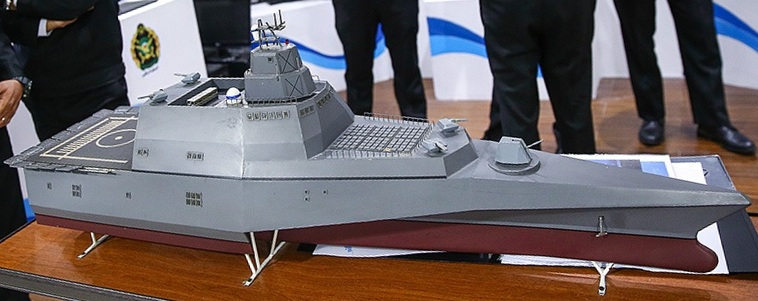
- Model unveiled in November 2019

Class overview
- Operators: Islamic Republic of Iran Navy

General characteristics
- Displacement: approximately 6,000 tons

Negin (Persian: نگین, lit. 'gemstone') is the tentative title of an upcoming class of warship designed by Iran, unveiled in November 2019. The design of the vessel resembles littoral combat ship (LCS) in the American terminology, though Iranians have identified it as a 'heavy destroyer'.

== Design and construction ==
The vessels in the class are to displace between 5,000 and 7,000 tons, according to what Iranian officials told press in November 2019. In April 2020, Iran announced that the design phase has been concluded and the construction of the lead ship will begin shortly.

== Analyses ==
The project is described as an attempt to improve blue-water capabilities of the Islamic Republic of Iran Navy, by Farzin Nadimi of The Washington Institute for Near East Policy. Military journalist David Axe is skeptical that Iran can build such a warship.

== See also ==
- List of naval ship classes of Iran
- List of military equipment manufactured in Iran
