= Loaded Bible =

Series of comic books by Tim Seeley

- Cover of Loaded Bible: Jesus vs. Vampires 1 (Apr 2006 Image Comics), art by Stefano Caselli

Publication information
- Publisher: Image Comics
- Schedule: Yearly (one-shots) monthly (mini-series)
- Title(s): Jesus vs. Vampires; Blood of Christ; Communion; Blood of My Blood (mini-series)
- Formats: Original material for the series has been published as a set of one-shot comics.
- Genre: Post-apocalyptic; Vampire
- Publication date: April 2006 – ongoing
- Number of issues: 7 (Blood of My Blood #4 in shops on June 1, 2022)
- Main character(s): Jesus Christ

Creative team
- Writer(s): Tim Seeley (+ Steve Orlando, co-writer of mini-series)
- Penciller(s): Jesus vs. Vampires; Nate Bellegarde; Blood of Christ & Communion; Mike Norton; Blood of My Blood; Giuseppe Cafaro
- Inker(s): Mark Englert
- Letterer(s): Jesus vs. Vampires; Steve Seeley; Blood of Christ; Brian J. Crowley
- Colorist(s): Rex Justice; Communion; Joseph Baker; Melissa Kaercher
- Editor(s): Robert Kirkman

Reprints
- Collected editions
- Loaded Bible: ISBN 1-58240-957-9

Loaded Bible is a series of one-shot comic books (and a comic book mini-series) written by Tim Seeley, with art by Nate Bellegarde, the first of which, Jesus vs. Vampires, was published in February 2006 by Image Comics.

== Publication history ==
A follow-up was released May 2007 called Loaded Bible 2: Blood of Christ and it takes place right after the first one. Loaded Bible 3: Communion was released February 2008 and is the conclusion to the first part of the series.

The first issue of Loaded Bible: Blood of My Blood (a 6-issue mini-series) was for sale in comic book shops starting March 2, 2022.

== Plot ==
The story starts with two acts: the discovery of vampires and the fact that the Christian religion has become much more fanatic. Then, a nuclear global war caused by the religion turns The Earth into an uninhabitable territory. Now, the second coming of Jesus Christ must save America from vampires.

== Collected editions ==
The three comic books have been collected into a trade paperback:

- Loaded Bible (168 pages, July 2008, ISBN 1-58240-957-9)

Loaded Bible is also available digitally through Devil's Due Digital.

== Other media ==
Halo-8 Entertainment has optioned the rights to make an "illustrated film" of Loaded Bible to be directed by Matt Pizzolo, who had previously done Godkiller.

== See also ==
- Jesus Hates Zombies
