= Hazed (comics) =

- Author: Mark Sable
- Cover artist: Robbi Rodriguez
- Language: English
- Genre: Graphic novel
- Publisher: Image Comics
- Publication date: February 2008
- Publication place: United States
- Media type: Print (Paperback)
- ISBN: 978-1-58240-869-9
- OCLC: 176882048

Hazed is a dark comedy about three young girls’ perilous journey through the world of sororities and eating disorders. It is a 160-page original graphic novel published by Image Comics in 2008, and is created by Mark Sable (writer of Image's Grounded and Fearless) and Robbi Rodriguez.
