= Hazed (disambiguation) =

Hazed refers to hazing, ritualistic abuse or humiliation used for initiation into a group.

Hazed may also refer to:

- Hazed (The Hardy Boys), the title of a Hardy Boys graphic novel
- Hazed (Image Comics), the title of a 2008 graphic novel by Image Comics
- Haze, an atmospheric phenomenon where dry particles obscure the clarity of the sky
