= Matt Pizzolo =

American dramatist

- Pizzolo at Worldcon 2026
- Born: Long Island, New York, United States
- Occupations: Film director, screenwriter, playwright, comic book writer, actor, producer, entrepreneur

Matt Pizzolo (born on Long Island, New York) is an American film director, screenwriter, producer, bestselling comic book writer, playwright, and entrepreneur, best known for his work as writer of the speculative politics comic books Calexit, Rogue State, and Young Terrorists, creator of the transmedia franchise Godkiller, writer-director of the "punk classic" indie movie Threat, and director of music videos for Atari Teenage Riot.

He co-founded and runs indie film studio HALO 8 Entertainment with producing partner Brian Giberson and comic book publisher Black Mask Studios with partner Brett Gurewitz and creative director Steve Niles.

In 2012 Pizzolo was selected by Wired as "World's Most Wired Comics Creator" for his work synthesizing genre media with street politics ("anticorporate DIY production") and innovating new storytelling technologies ("engineering the transmedia spine that will take comics into the future").

Pizzolo became involved in political organizing in 2017, leveraging the momentum of his comic book series Calexit. He formed the political action committee "Become The Government" to support first time political candidates in the 2018 midterm elections (initially funded by his Calexit royalties), ran interviews with first-time candidates and grassroots organizers in the non-fiction backmatter of Calexit, and hosted Indivisible to run voter registration at his booth on the showfloor of San Diego Comic-Con.

== Career ==
=== Threat ===
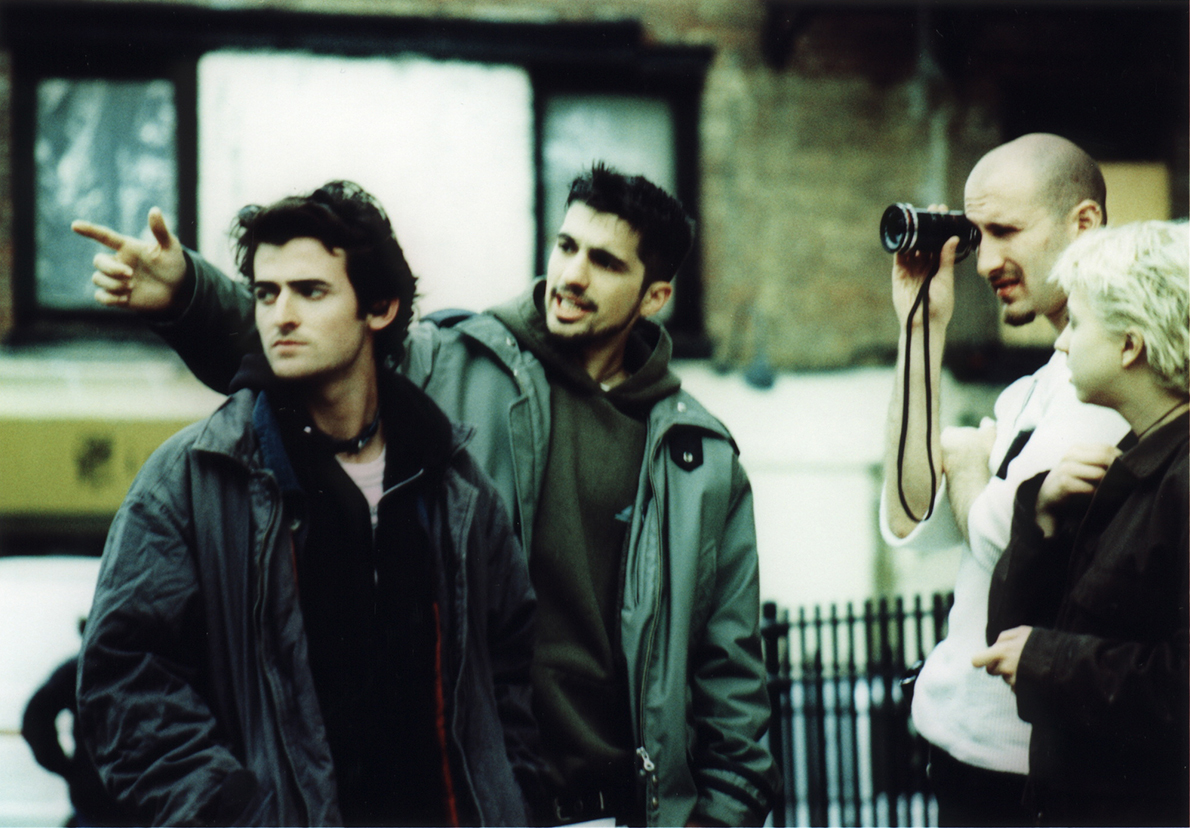
Matt Pizzolo directing Carlos Puga on set of Threat with DP Benjamin Brancato and producer Katie Nisa. (photo by Jason Rose)

Pizzolo was 19 years old, living out of a backpack in New York City's Lower East Side and working at Kim's Video and Tower Records when he wrote the screenplay for Threat, a radical, transgressive story of class struggle and youth violence.

He intended to shoot Hi8 footage of the principal characters and cut their dialogue and reaction shots against footage stolen from obscure films, creating a unique project built on film sampling (a common practice in the indie rock music of the time). As the project developed, Pizzolo discarded the sampling format and instead directed it on 16mm film as a traditional independent film despite the fact that its massive scope of location and action was quite ambitious for no-budget indies of the time which generally focused on a single-location, talking-heads format.

Writing in Film Threat, T.W. Anderson rated Threat 4.5 out 5, saying "This film works on every conceivable level; it holds court not only as a historical document of time and place, but also as a window into the soul of American adolescence... The film is a revelation partly because of the subject matter, partly because of the DiY ethic but most importantly because the performances ring so true. The cast of mostly non-professional actors extract remarkable performances that frighten and stir the audience throughout this epic battle of cinematic creativity... Great art should assail the status quo, and that is what Pizzolo and Nisa’s film has skillfully accomplished."

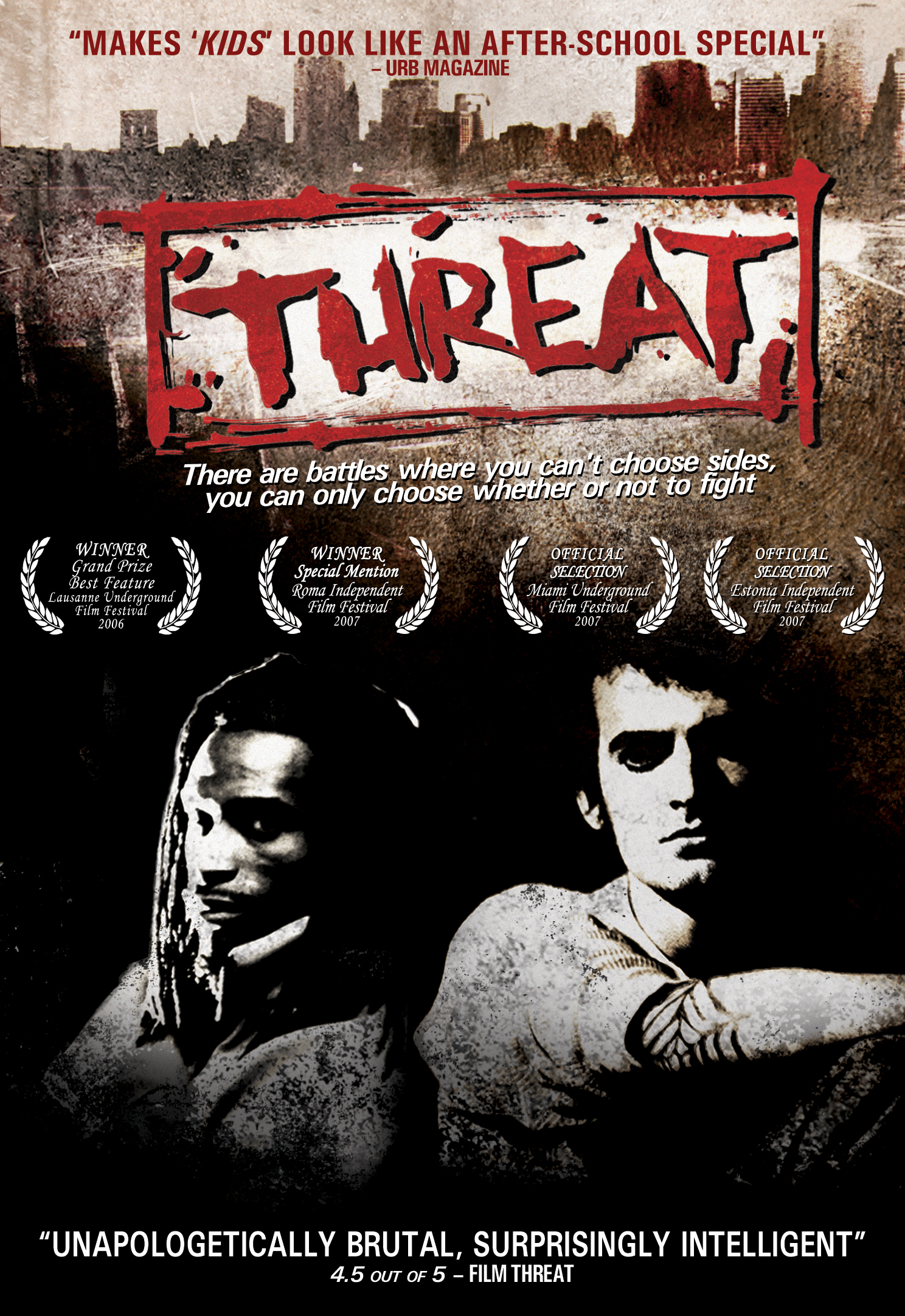
DVD cover of Threat with Keith Middleton and Carlos Puga. (designed by Robert Anthony Jr.)

Threat attracted controversy for allegedly glorifying violence and class conflict. When Threat premiered in US theaters, SuicideGirls commented, "Matt Pizzolo shook up Hollywood with his indie movie Threat and the guerrilla tactics he used to produce and distribute it. A defiant and confrontational movie about class war and unbridled youth violence, Threat is not exactly the type of film you might expect to earn its writer-director a multi-picture deal with Sony, but that's exactly what Pizzolo managed to accomplish along with his filmmaking partner Katie Nisa and their Kings Mob multimedia militia."

Writing in DVD Talk, Preston Jones said "A raw blast of visceral anger, Threat explodes off the screen eliciting comparisons to early Martin Scorsese, Abel Ferrara and Larry Clark's nihilistic masterpiece Kids. Pretty heady company and it's to director Matt Pizzolo's credit that when Threat works, it's more than worthy of being mentioned in the same breath as those films... Undeniably compelling, Threat grabs you by the throat and holds tight for 90 minutes."

In his 9 out of 10 review for Terrorizer Magazine, Neil Kulkarni called Threat "Genuinely unsettling, thrillingly chaotic, a tale of a cross-cultural riot that takes in philosophy, polemic and politics without taking a breath… it’s a morally complex, beautifully acted, occasionally sickeningly violent portrayal of the underground."

Threat has been called a cult-classic and a "punk classic," winning multiple film festival awards, and touring punk and hip-hop venues across the U.S. and Europe, including over 100 dates on the Van's Warped Tour. Threat garnered a theatrical release and wide distribution after its appearance at Coachella.

Ray Gun called Threat "important... special and different from everything else out there," The Village Voice's Long Island Voice called it a "triumph," Earcandy said "Threat is simply the voice of this generation's youth... it is easily one of the most important films of the decade," Entertainment Today called it "brutal yet fascinating," the McGill Daily said "Visionary director Matt Pizzolo takes a harsh look at what it means to be a disaffected youth, showing that the promised land of opportunity and the American dream are relics of the past," and Urb Magazine said Threat "makes Kids look like an after-school special."

After tour screenings, Pizzolo and filmmaking partner Katie Nisa taught DiY Filmmaking Workshops for aspiring guerrilla filmmakers. Over time, the filmmaking workshops became a focus of the events and Pizzolo invited local independent media-makers to teach various DiY-instructional workshops.

==== DiY-Fest ====
These workshops developed into DiY-Fest, the "touring carnival of Do-it-Yourself mediamaking" with contributions from notable independent artists including Ian MacKaye, Ani Difranco, Howard Zinn, Jello Biafra, Jim Jarmusch, Jem Cohen, Sarah Jacobson, Abel Ferrara, and many more.

==== "Rage" ====
Pizzolo was invited to give a lecture on DiY media at 2600 Magazine's H.O.P.E.: Hackers On Planet Earth conference. He titled the lecture "Open Source Mediamaking" and articulated the need for independent media by contrasting the relatively tepid news coverage of the 1999 WTO protests in Seattle against the provocative and incendiary documentary footage shot independently by activists on the ground inside the protests. The radical band Atari Teenage Riot invited Pizzolo to create a video for their song "Rage" and utilize the documentary footage in the hopes of spreading it to a wider audience. Pizzolo incorporated footage from the WTO protests in Seattle, the World Bank protests in Washington DC, and the May Day protests in Berlin where members of Atari Teenage Riot were arrested (footage was provided by pickAxe Productions, Big Noise Films, Re:Generation TV, and Philipp Virus). The video played numerous festivals including the Chicago Underground Film Festival and was later included in Buddyhead's Punk Is Dead music video compilation DVD.

=== HALO 8 Entertainment ===
In 2005, Pizzolo formed HALO 8 Entertainment, a production, distribution, and marketing company devoted to counterculture films, punk rock cinema, and alt-lifestyle videos. Although the company was partly devised as a distribution infrastructure for Kings Mob's productions, HALO-8 quickly grew into a thriving indie studio with various shingles including horror movie/cult film sub-label UnitShifter Films and alt-lifestyle sub-label DiY-Fest Video.

One of the first films Pizzolo championed at HALO-8 was the controversial and embattled Your Mommy Kills Animals, a critically acclaimed documentary about the animal rights movement. Although widely praised for its unbiased approach, the film drew the ire of Washington lobbying firm Center for Consumer Freedom, who waged a costly legal campaign to block release of the film. Despite Amazon.com, Netflix, and numerous other retailers, film festivals, and movie theaters' decision to drop the film when faced with legal threats and intimidation, Pizzolo stood by the film and continued its distribution despite fierce, ongoing opposition.

=== "Godkiller" ===
In 2008, Pizzolo expanded Halo 8 into comic books by writing Godkiller. The comic book was illustrated by Anna Muckcracker and was released as limited edition print comic books at Fangoria's Weekend of Horrors, Wizard World Chicago, and WonderCon.

==== Godkiller: The Illustrated Film ====
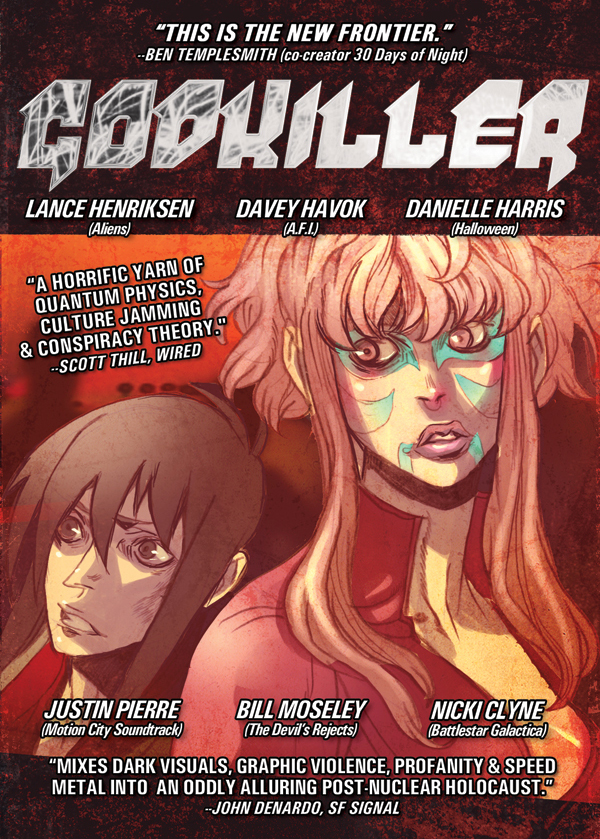
DVD cover of Godkiller. (designed by Robert Anthony Jr., illustration by Anna Muckcracker Wieszczyk.)

In February 2009, Pizzolo announced his next film would be an illustrated film called Godkiller: Walk Among Us, adapted from his graphic novel of the same name, which was illustrated by Anna Muckcracker. Set in the future after an economic collapse, a nuclear holy war and an alien invasion, Godkiller: Walk Among Us follows an orphan named Tommy as he searches for a new heart for his ill sister, Lucy. Pizzolo explained the inspiration of the story thus: "I thought it would be fun to design a new mythology for fuck-ups and misfits. My goal with it is to present heroes that don't behave heroically because it's their job to maintain the status quo or because they're bored and want to rescue a princess, they act heroically because they're regular misfits who are trying to do the best they can for each other in an unjust, fucked-up world."

The illustrated film format Pizzolo developed with producer Brian Giberson for Godkiller merges sequential art with 3D CGI, motion graphics and dramatic voice performances in the style of a radio play.

Godkiller featured performances by Lance Henriksen, Danielle Harris, Justin Pierre (singer of Motion City Soundtrack), Davey Havok (singer of AFI), Nicki Clyne, Bill Moseley, Katie Nisa, Lydia Lunch, and a musical score composed by Alec Empire and Nic Endo of Atari Teenage Riot.

Once released, the first episodic DVD quickly established itself as its distributor's all-time fastest-selling release.

In May 2010, the Godkiller: Walk Among Us series of shortform illustrated film was collected into a feature-length film and distributed in theaters. It was distributed day and date with a digital release by Warner Brothers before streaming on Netflix and Hulu.

==== Godkiller: Silent War ====
The Godkiller: Walk Among Us DVDs included serialized audiobooks of the prequel urban fantasy/speculative fiction novel Godkiller: Silent War. Set in the near future, Godkiller: Silent War tells the story of Joe Junior, a 17-year-old draft-dodger who is recruited by an armed cult of populist assassins and thrust into a secret world of international cabals, alien conspiracies, and the countdown to Armageddon.

==== The Long Knives ====
During Halo-8's panel at WonderCon in April 2010, Pizzolo announced production of The Long Knives, a comic book illustrated by Ana Ludeshka and animated Giallo film homage to Dario Argento.

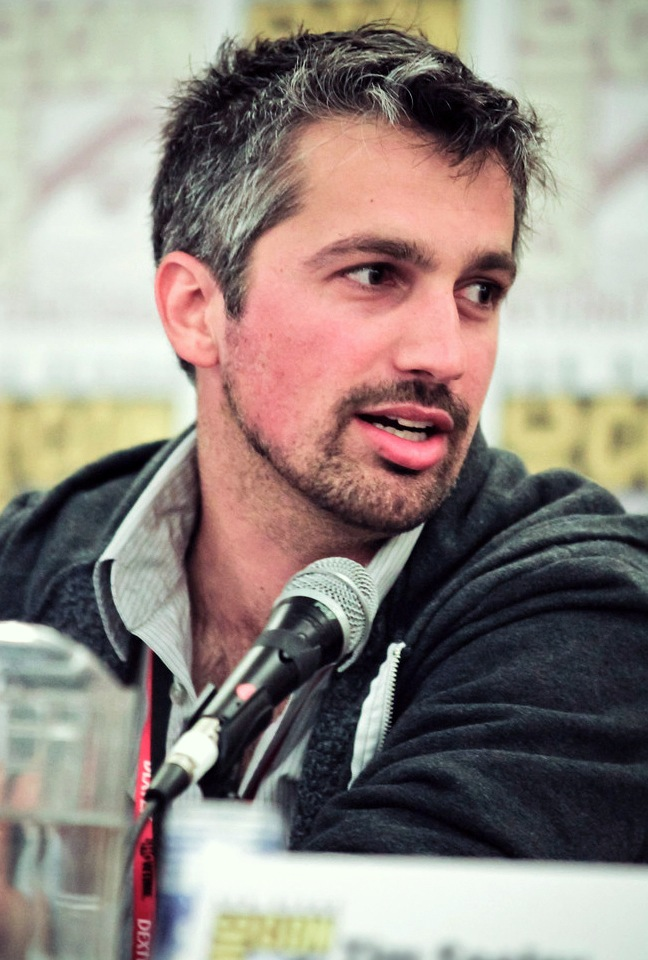
Pizzolo during a Transmedia panel at the 2011 San Diego Comic-Con

Though not an official prequel, Pizzolo has indicated that The Long Knives takes place in a shared universe with Godkiller and deals with several key Godkiller characters during the breakdown of society that precedes Godkiller: Walk Among Us.

The Long Knives comic book series debuted on digital comics platform Graphic.ly.

=== Black Mask Studios ===
Godkiller's success led to Pizzolo co-founding the comic book publishing company Black Mask Studios with Brett Gurewitz in 2012. The label was formed with Pizzolo serving as president and Steve Niles as creative director. On forming the company, Gurewitz told Wired "Comics and punk have a lot in common, being transgressive art forms with under-appreciated potential for social influence." Focusing on transgressive art and genre stories with a social message, Pizzolo coined the name Black Mask as an homage to the anarchist group Black Mask and the Edgar Allan Poe story The Masque of the Red Death.

=== Comic Book Writing ===
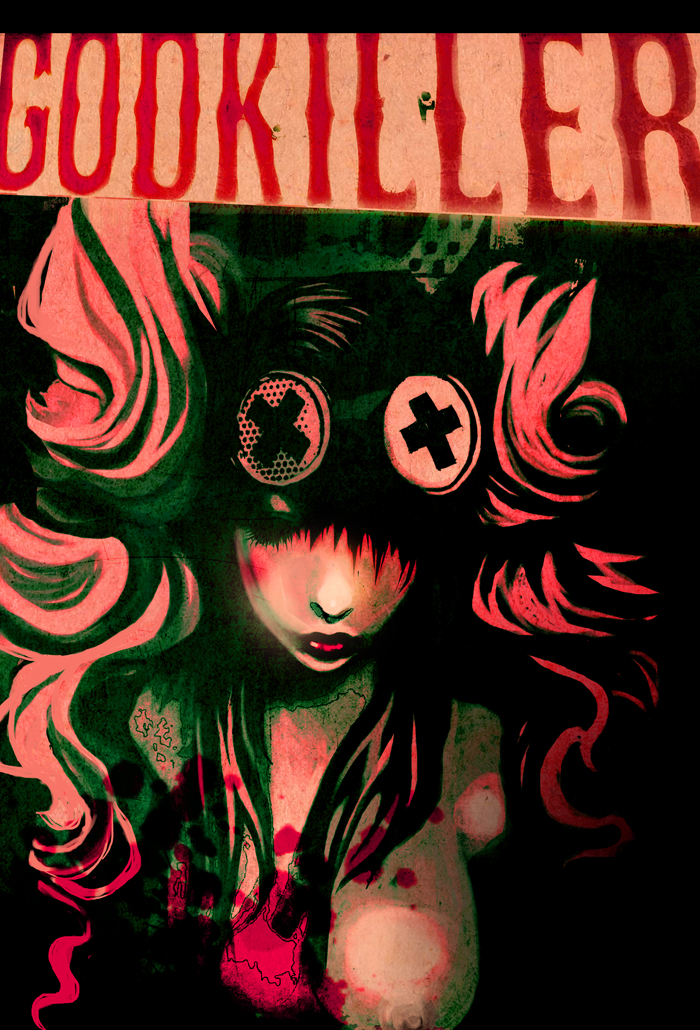
Cover of Godkiller: Walk Among Us #2. Art by Anna Muckcracker Wieszczyk.

In 2014, Black Mask re-released the Godkiller limited edition comics as Godkiller, vol 1: Walk Among Us.

The Godkiller re-release was met with strong sales and acclaim, becoming the still-fledgling publisher's highest-selling and most-reprinted comic book at its time of release. Godkiller sold through three re-printings and placed #1 on the comic industry's Advanced Reorder Charts.

Kirkus Reviews placed it on its Best Books Of The Year List, calling Godkiller "Stellar... enchanting... wonderfully bizarre... deftly unorthodox and wickedly delectable" in a starred review.

Bloody Disgusting said "I was truly moved... It's a dizzying read that will burrow into the core of your being. It pushed me further than I've ever been pushed and it establishes a new level of dialogue in the medium" in a 5 Skull Review.

Comic book writer Tim Seeley called Godkiller, "That early display of genius. A nascent voice ready to make a lot of fucking noise. It showed Pizzolo’s skills, his tastes, his balls, and it set the stage for what would come from Black Mask and Pizzolo."

==== "Young Terrorists" ====
In 2015, Pizzolo wrote the Amazon bestselling graphic novel series Young Terrorists illustrated by Amancay Nahuelpan, which became one of the top selling independent graphic novels of the year (#1 Mature Readers, #2 Marketwide) according to Publishers Weekly, going on to sell through four printings.

Acclaimed at its time of release, Young Terrorists #1 remains Black Mask's all-time top-reviewed debut issue of a new series. LA Weekly called it "thought-provoking," Dan Casey writing in Nerdist called it "Thrilling… Violent, aggressive, and taps into an undercurrent of rage against the proverbial machine that is pervasive in the world around us," Amy Giardiniere writing in CBR said Young Terrorists "fearlessly attacks politics in a completely savage way," Emma Houxbois writing in Comicosity called it "the most ambitious and fiery debut I’ve ever seen," and Julian Darius (writer of Grant Morrison: The Early Years) said Young Terrorists is "The Invisibles on PCP!"

==== "Calexit" ====
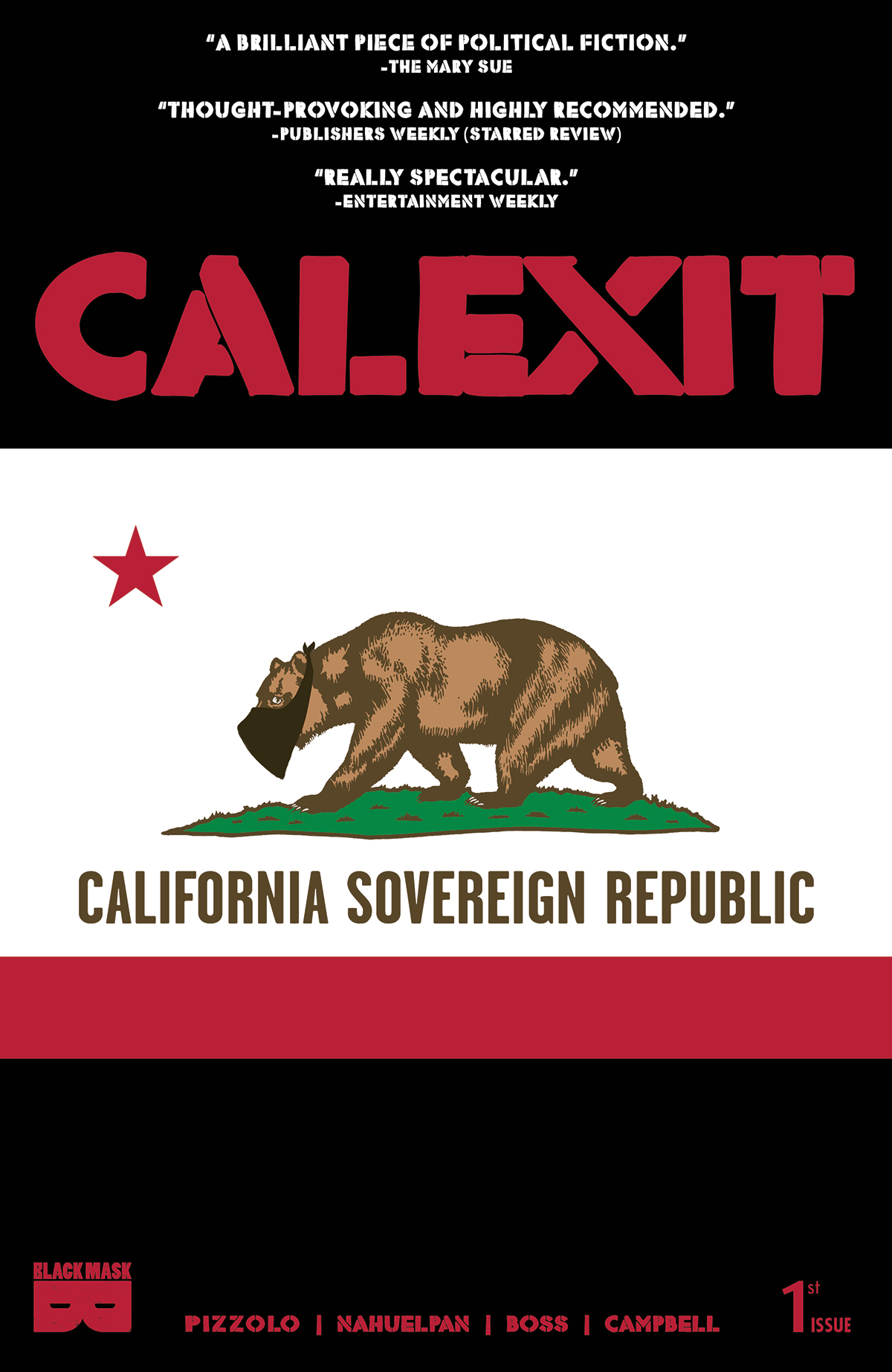
Cover of Calexit #1. Art by Amancay Nahuelpan.

Pizzolo and Nahuelpan followed up Young Terrorists with the acclaimed comic book series Calexit in 2017.

Calexit sold out its first print run of 25,000 copies within 24 hours, going on to sell through seven additional printings.

Calexit: The Battle of Universal City #1 debuted on July 23, 2025, and also sold out its first print run within 24 hours of release. On August 7, 2025, a second printing was announced, followed by a third printing with new cover by artist Elisa Pocetta.

The Calexit comics received positive reviews from io9, Boing Boing, Newsarama, New York Magazine / Vulture, Entertainment Weekly, Rolling Stone, NPR, Paste, Salon, and a starred review in Publishers Weekly.

Cory Doctorow, writing in Boing Boing, called Calexit "not wish fulfillment: it's warning -- and a scarily imminent and salient warning at that. But that's not all: it's superb."

Abraham Josephine Riesman, writing in Vulture, said "Calexit may sound a bit on the nose. After all, it's a tale about the establishment of a breakaway Californian republic in the wake of a presidency not too dissimilar from our current one. But trust me, it works. There are no easy gags about Californians, no silly jabs at Trumpism, and no over-the-top satire of our current state of decline. Instead, the creators have opted to tell a terrifyingly straightforward suspense story about the intrigues and crackdowns that ensue when governments decay and societies rot. The scariest thing about Calexit is how lived-in it feels — after all, every dystopia is just an accurate description of how things are for other people somewhere in the world, and this story just reminds us that we're always a hair's breadth away from the very bad things that we assume only happen in failed states."

Calexit received news coverage in The New York Times on the cover of the Arts Section, CNN, The San Francisco Chronicle, The Washington Post, Breitbart, Snopes, The Hollywood Reporter, The San Diego Tribune, CBS News, and LA Weekly.

Pizzolo was interviewed about the comic in appearances on CNN Newsroom, KCRW's Press Play (interviewed by Madeleine Brand), and KPCC's Take Two (interviewed by A. Martinez).

Paste called Calexit "caustically powerful," The Mary Sue called it "a brilliant piece of political fiction," and Publishers Weekly said it is "topical... insightful... this rock-solid dystopian comic is thought-provoking and highly recommended" in a starred review.

==== "Godkiller" continuing series ====
The Godkiller comic book series returned in 2021 with the sequel volume Godkiller: Tomorrow's Ashes. It immediately sold out of its first printing of over 40,000 within 24 hours of its release (becoming Black Mask's top-selling comic at the time), and went on to sell through four printings.

Writing in Syfywire, Matthew Jackson called Godkiller: Tomorrow's Ashes "in many ways the embodiment of what Black Mask is all about as a publisher: Bold, visceral storytelling unconcerned with being pinned down in one genre or category."

The success of Tomorrow's Ashes spawned follow-ups Godkiller: Spiderland and Godkiller: For Those I Love I Will Sacrifice (both of which sold through multiple printings) as well as the announced but not yet released Godkiller: The Color You Took From Her Eyes.

==== "Rogue State" ====
In 2022, Pizzolo wrote the new mini-series Rogue State, illustrated by Carlos Granda. The two had previously collaborated on the short Calexit: All Systems San Diego. Deadline Hollywood described it as "a new comic about a near future army of young vigilantes resisting a paramilitary police state after the Supreme Court rules that militias are Constitutionally protected."

Rogue State sold out of its initial print run of nearly 50,000 within 24 hours of release, becoming Black Mask's all-time top-selling launch. It held five of the Top 12 spots on Comichron's Advanced Reorder Charts, and went on to sell through 4 printings.

Rolling Stone called Rogue State "an American hellscape in art," Gizmodo called it "a hyper-extrapolated, sideways glance at some very real-world anxieties," and The San Francisco Chronicle said "it's a genre known as 'speculative fiction,' except it doesn't feel as speculative anymore."

Chuck D of Public Enemy illustrated three variant covers for Rogue State, saying "the concepts Matt is presenting here are so familiar they should be terrifying.”

=== Other work ===
==== Activism ====
Pizzolo organized the political action committee "Become The Government" in 2017 to support first time political candidates in the 2018 midterm eections funded by royalties from his comic book Calexit. In the non-fiction section of Calexit, he interviewed midterm candidate Sara Innamorato and her campaign team ahead of her victory in Pennsylvania, as well as journalist David Sirota whose wife Emily Sirota won a House seat in the 2018 midterms, and numerous other activists and organizers.

An Indivisible volunteer registers a new voter. Calexit's Emmie-X illustrated by Emily Pearson, created by Matt Pizzolo and Carlos Granda

Pizzolo hosted Indivisible to run voter registration at his booth on the showfloor of San Diego Comic-Con in 2018, where he unveiled the charity comic book Calexit: All Systems San Diego (referencing San Diego band Rocket from the Crypt's album) which introduced the new character Emmie-X, a pirate radio DJ in Occupied San Diego.

Indivisible San Diego adopted Emmie-X as the face of their 2018 voter outreach efforts with the "Voting Is My Superpower" campaign. Artist Emily Pearson (The Wilds, Snap Flash Hustle, Bonding) illustrated Emmie-X for the campaign.

Pizzolo and Indivisible also organized a free "Voting Is My Superpower" event during San Diego Comic-Con at Comickaze Comics in Liberty Station for locals who were unable to afford Comic Con badges. Indivisible leader Kathy Stadler, ACLU Advocacy Director David Trujillo, and Council on American-Islamic Relations community liaison Yusef Miller joined Pizzolo for a discussion of how dystopian art can help prepare people for crises in real life.

==== Producing ====
Pizzolo has been announced as producer on the Warner Brothers feature film adaptation of the Black Mask Studios comic book series BLACK, about a world where only black people have superpowers, and the Orion Pictures / Miramax / PictureStart / Amazon MGM Studios feature film adaptation of the comic book series 4 Kids Walk into a Bank, about a 12-year-old girl who enlists her friends to rob a bank in order to prevent her dad and his friends from botching the job themselves and getting thrown back in jail.

During Halo-8's panel at C2E2, it was announced that Pizzolo would collaborate with Tim Seeley on an adaptation of the comic book series Loaded Bible.

During the same panel, Pizzolo unveiled the first concept art for Medusa: Year One, which Pizzolo describes as "A twist on the Medusa origin-story.",

Pizzolo will direct an illustrated film adaptation of the comic book series Hack/Slash.

Pizzolo organized the Occupy Comics project featuring dozens of comics pros including Alan Moore, David Lloyd, Ben Templesmith, Molly Crabapple, J.M. DeMatteis, Charlie Adlard, Steve Niles, Amanda Palmer and Anna Wieszczyk.

In July 2021, it was announced that Pizzolo will write an adult animated series adaptation of the comic book series Faust, a deconstructed superhero comic contemporaneous with Watchmen, Dark Knight Returns and The Crow, for Sony Television. The comic book launched in 1987 and is considered to be "one of the goriest, most NSFW superhero horror comic book series ever published."

== Production style ==
Pizzolo's artistic and entrepreneurial works are reflective of his DIY ethos and belief that a subversive artist can only maintain creative control of a project if he or she also controls the business aspects including production, distribution, and marketing.

In 1998, while working on Threat, he told Style Magazine, "When we were thinking of starting a DiY production company, there were no models on how to do it in independent film. So we looked to musical role-models like the Wu-Tang Clan, the punk Epitaph label, and the hardcore Dischord label. Now we want Kings Mob to be the role model we couldn't find."

== Awards ==
In October 2006, Pizzolo accepted the Grand Prize for Best Feature on behalf of Threat at the Lausanne Underground Film and Music Festival in Lausanne, Switzerland.

In April 2007, Pizzolo was awarded the "First Feature Film - Special Mention" prize on behalf of Threat at the Rome Independent Film Festival in Rome, Italy.
