= Two-Face: Year One =

- Issue #1, art by Mark Chiarello.

Publication information
- Publisher: DC Comics
- Schedule: Monthly
- Format: Prestige
- Publication date: July – October 2008
- No. of issues: Two
- Main character(s): Two-Face; Batman; Jim Gordon

Creative team
- Written by: Mark Sable
- Artist(s): Jesus Saiz and Jimmy Palmiotti

Two-Face: Year One is a two-part miniseries released by DC Comics. It was released in July 2008 to coincide with The Dark Knight, although it is set in the comics' continuity and not the film's.

It chronicles the origin of Two-Face also known as Harvey Dent D.A., one of Batman's archfoes; the first issue details the downfall of Harvey Dent, and the second issue focuses on Two-Face as he runs for re-election.
