= Calexit (comic) =

2017 comic by Matteo Pizzolo and Amancay Nahuelpan

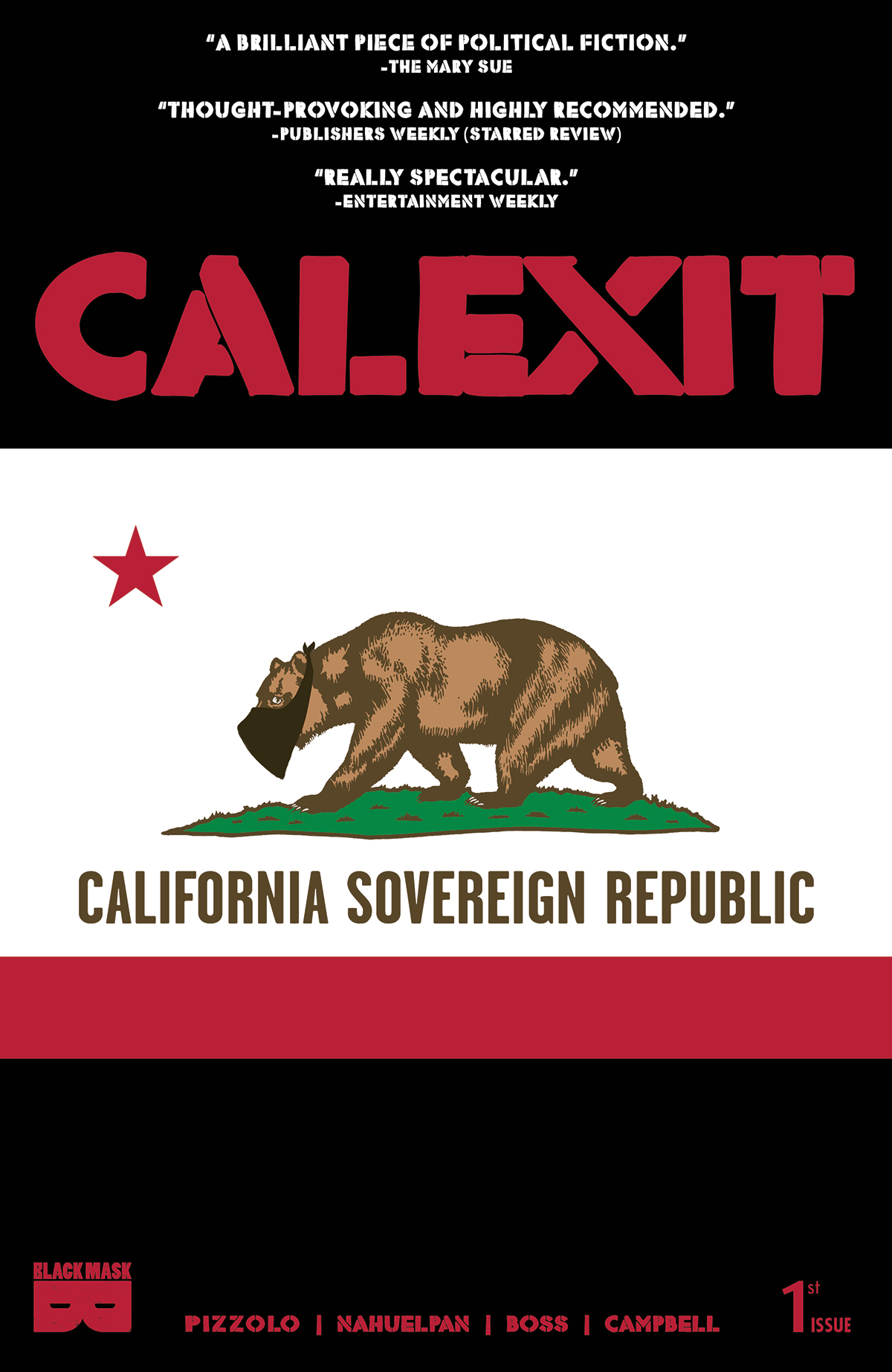
- Calexit #1 (Fifth Printing) cover by Amancay Nahuelpan

Publication information
- Publisher: Black Mask Studios
- Schedule: irregular
- Format: Ongoing series
- Publication date: July 2017–present
- No. of issues: 11

Creative team
- Written by: Matteo Pizzolo
- Artist(s): Amancay Nahuelpan, Carlos Granda, Butch Mapa, Elisa Pocetta, Winston Smith, Ashley A. Woods, Ben Templesmith, Maria Llovet, Tyler Boss, Soo Lee, Skylar Patridge, Alexis Ziritt, Tim Smith 3, Robert Anthony Jr, Richard Nisa, Luana Vecchio, Creees Lee, Sunando, Emily Pearson, Duski Loveless
- Penciller(s): Amancay Nahuelpan, Carlos Granda, Butch Mapa, Elisa Pocetta
- Letterer(s): Jim Campbell, DC Hopkins
- Colorist(s): Tyler Boss, James Offredi, Elisa Pocetta, Brad Simpson, Lauren Affe

Collected editions
- Calexit vol. 1: ISBN 978-1628751819

Calexit is a speculative fiction comic book written by Matteo Pizzolo, illustrated by Amancay Nahuelpan, Carlos Granda, Butch Mapa, and Elisa Pocetta, and published by Black Mask Studios.

The book has been called "prescient" and "all-too-topical" as if "Matt Pizzolo has some kind of crystal ball for this thing."

According to Entertainment Weekly, the comic book was initially created prior to the 2016 United States presidential election and before the term Calexit was adopted by the Yes California initiative, explaining that the story was actually inspired by the California droughts. Pizzolo said "The thought of having to rely on the federal government for something like water was scary... To my mind, the comic isn't about secession or attacking the government, it's about people learning to take care of one another at a time when it feels like we're all slipping apart." CNN reported that Pizzolo based the comic book title off of Brexit.

The comic has been cited as "seemingly ripped-from-the-headlines" and predicting events, such as in The Battle of San Onofre (2025), which "tells the story of friends radicalized by a DHS raid at their workplace, and though seemingly ripped from today's headlines, the story was written last year before the current wave of deportations."

== Plot ==
Following an order from the United States federal government to deport all immigrants, California declares itself a sanctuary state, triggering a military intervention by the federal government plunging the state into chaos. The series follows Jamil, a smuggler, and Zora, a resistance leader, who escape together from a detention facility in Occupied Los Angeles.

== Reception ==
Calexit sold out its first print run of 25,000 copies within 24 hours, going on to sell through seven additional printings.

Calexit: The Battle of Universal City #1 debuted on July 23, 2025, and also sold out its first print run within 24 hours of release. On August 7, 2025, a second printing was announced, followed by a third printing with new cover by artist Elisa Pocetta.

The Calexit comics received positive reviews from io9, Boing Boing, Newsarama, New York Magazine / Vulture, Entertainment Weekly, Rolling Stone, NPR, Paste, Salon, and a starred review in Publishers Weekly.

Cory Doctorow, writing in Boing Boing, called it "not wish fulfillment: it's warning -- and a scarily imminent and salient warning at that. But that's not all: it's superb."

Abraham Josephine Riesman, writing in Vulture, said "Calexit may sound a bit on the nose. After all, it's a tale about the establishment of a breakaway Californian republic in the wake of a presidency not too dissimilar from our current one. But trust me, it works. There are no easy gags about Californians, no silly jabs at Trumpism, and no over-the-top satire of our current state of decline. Instead, the creators have opted to tell a terrifyingly straightforward suspense story about the intrigues and crackdowns that ensue when governments decay and societies rot. The scariest thing about Calexit is how lived-in it feels — after all, every dystopia is just an accurate description of how things are for other people somewhere in the world, and this story just reminds us that we're always a hair's breadth away from the very bad things that we assume only happen in failed states."

Calexit received news coverage in The New York Times on the cover of the Arts Section, CNN, The San Francisco Chronicle, The Washington Post, Breitbart, Snopes, The Hollywood Reporter, The San Diego Tribune, CBS News, and LA Weekly.

Pizzolo was interviewed about the comic in appearances on CNN Newsroom, KCRW's Press Play (interviewed by Madeleine Brand), and KPCC's Take Two (interviewed by A. Martinez).

Paste called it "caustically powerful," The Mary Sue called it "a brilliant piece of political fiction," and Publishers Weekly said it is "topical... insightful... this rock-solid dystopian comic is thought-provoking and highly recommended" in a starred review.

== Publication ==
Black Mask put out three issues of Calexit written by Pizzolo, illustrated by Nahuelpan, and colored by Tyler Boss, from July 2017 to May 2018, followed by a trade paperback collection published in June 2018. Covers were illustrated by Amancay Nahuelpan, Winston Smith, Ashley A. Woods, Ben Templesmith, Maria Llovet, Tyler Boss, Soo Lee, Skylar Patridge, Alexis Ziritt, and Tim Smith 3. Calexit's flags were designed by Robert Anthony Jr, and its map was designed by Richard Nisa.

In July 2018, Black Mask released Calexit: All Systems San Diego written by Pizzolo and illustrated by Carlos Granda with colors by Lauren Affe and covers by Tyler Boss and Ben Templesmith.

In July 2022, Calexit: Our Last Night In America was released, also by Pizzolo and Granda, with colors by Brad Simpson and cover by Sunando.

In July 2025, volume 2 Calexit: The Battle Of Universal City debuted, written by Pizzolo, illustrated by Granda, colored by James Offredi, and lettered by DC Hopkins, with covers by Amancay Nahuelpan, Carlos Granda, Luana Vecchio, Creees Lee, and Duski Loveless.

Also in 2025, two spinoffs were released: Calexit: L For Luigi written by Pizzolo, illustrated by Elisa Pocetta, and lettered by DC Hopkins, and Calexit: The Battle of San Onofre written by Pizzolo, illustrated by Butch Mapa, colored by James Offredi, and lettered by DC Hopkins

In January 2026, volume 3 Calexit: Say Goodbye To Hollywood was announced for a Spring release, written by Pizzolo and illustrated by Granda.

== Activism ==
Several Calexit comics have been designed as charitable fundraisers.

Pizzolo organized the political action committee "Become The Government" in 2017 to support first time political candidates in the 2018 midterm elections funded by royalties from the Calexit comic book.

An Indivisible volunteer registers a new voter. Calexit's Emmie-X illustrated by Emily Pearson, created by Matt Pizzolo and Carlos Granda

Pizzolo hosted Indivisible to run voter registration at the Calexit booth on the showfloor of San Diego Comic-Con in 2018, where he unveiled the charity comic book Calexit: All Systems San Diego (referencing San Diego band Rocket from the Crypt's album) which introduced the new character Emmie-X, a pirate radio DJ in Occupied San Diego. Profits from Calexit: All Systems San Diego were donated to San Diego Rapid Response to help families separated during the border crisis.

Indivisible San Diego adopted Emmie-X as the face of their 2018 voter outreach efforts with the "Voting Is My Superpower" campaign. Artist Emily Pearson (The Wilds, Snap Flash Hustle, Bonding) illustrated Emmie-X for the campaign.

In 2025, Pizzolo debuted two new Calexit comics: The Battle of San Onofre (illustrated by Butch Mapa) and L For Luigi (illustrated by Elisa Pocetta), with profits from both being donated to Alliance San Diego to help families affected by the ICE Raids. Pizzolo explained to Comics Beat that he was inspired to donate the profits after seeing The Battle of San Onofre story become darkly prophetic when real-life ICE raids mirrored the book's speculative-fiction after he wrote it:

“With Calexit, I do my best to keep the dystopia optimistic and constructive. I focus on characters struggling to do the right thing for each other in a world gone mad. I wrote this character-origin story last year, and it's heartbreaking to see real world events devolve at such a rapid clip and mirror the comic's dark speculation. We're doing what we can with the tools at our disposal, raising money for an organization that is on the frontlines, helping people.”

== Adaptation ==
A television pilot based on Calexit, written by Pizzolo, was optioned by MRC in a five-studio bidding war. It was then purchased by the studio, but ultimately reverted before being produced.

In July 2025, Chad Stahelski was announced to produce a feature film adaptation of the comic. Pizzolo wrote the spec script.
