= Matt Miner =

American comic writer and activist

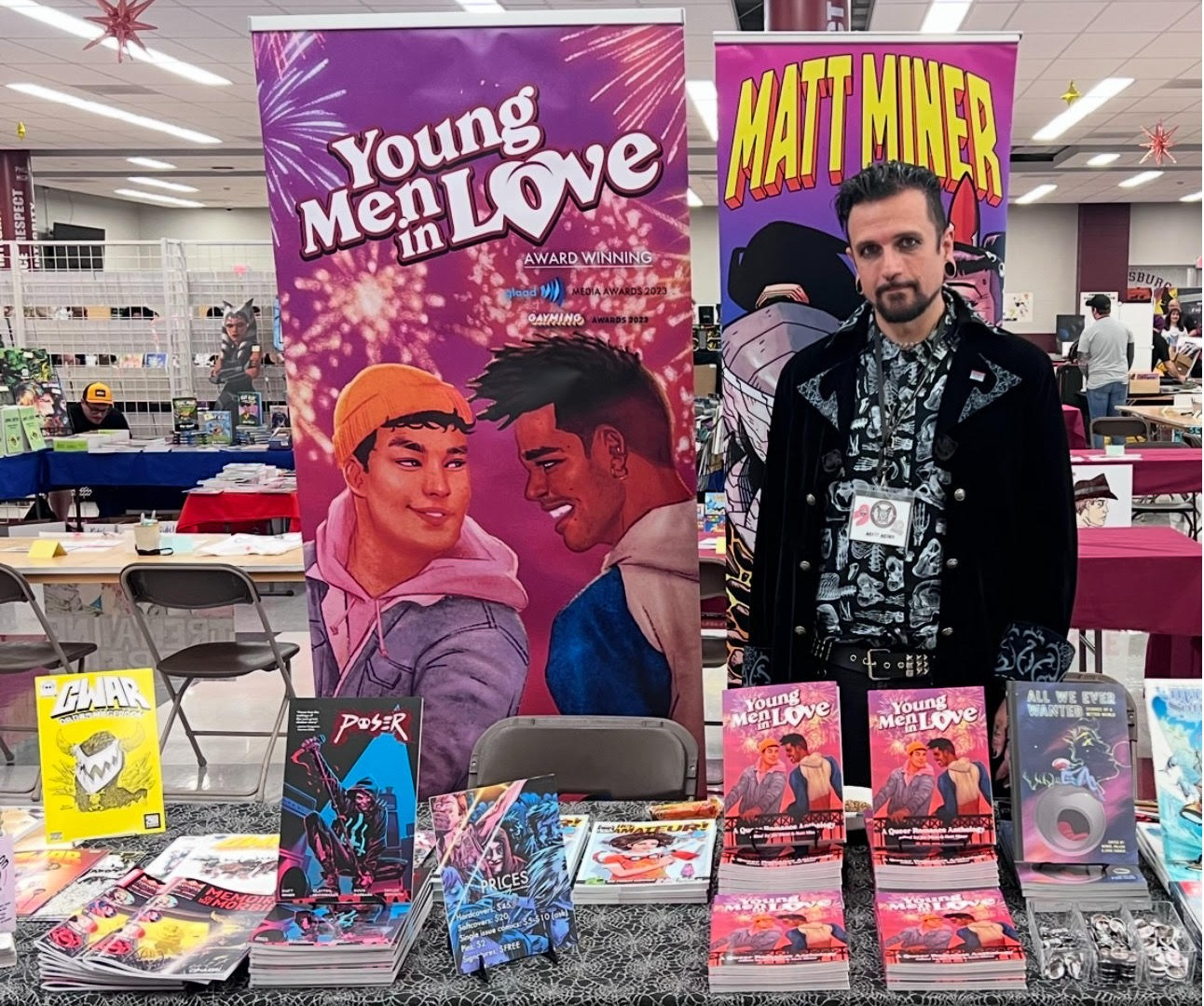
Matt Miner at Philipsburg Comic Con 2023

Matt Miner is an American comic book writer, editor, activist and animal rescuer best known for works such as Liberator, Toe Tag Riot, and GWAR Orgasmageddon. He also co-edited anthologies such as This Nightmare Kills Fascists, All We Ever Wanted: Stories of a Better World, and Young Men in Love.

Outside of comics, Miner is also the Vice President and co-founder of Zion's Mission Animal Rescue, a grassroots dog rescue in New York City that focuses their efforts in the Rockaways community in Queens.

== Animal Activism and Rescue Work ==
Miner turned to veganism in his late 20s and became involved with animal activism campaigns such as Ringling's, anti-fur, and, after to moving to New York, the campaign against Huntingdon Life Sciences, a contract testing company that was a target of the international campaign called Stop Huntingdon Animal Cruelty (SHAC) due to their large animal testing policies.

After moving to New York City, Miner and his then wife, Sloane Quealy-Miner, began rescuing stray and abandoned animals within the Rockaway, Queens community. During Hurricane Sandy in 2012, both Miner and Quealy-Miner rescued dozens of dogs who were displaced or lost. In 2019, Miner and Quealy-Miner co-founded Zion's Mission Animal Rescue, where Miner is the standing Vice President after years of working with a partner for Redemption Rescue.

== Career ==
Miner began his comic book writing career after taking a comic book writing course with Scott Snyder and shortly after published his first comic Liberator in 2013, a four-issue series published by Black Mask Studios. The comic features a couple of young, masked vigilantes who rescue animals from abusers and sabotage facilities involved in animal exploitation, and included nonfiction essays on real-world activism. Miner explained that he was inspired by real life videos from Animal Liberation Front, when he thought to himself, "Holy shit, these people are like masked superheroes – like Batman – but for animals!" and wanted to portray them as heroes. A portion of its profits was donated to animal rescue efforts, including Miner's rescue, Zion's Mission Animal Rescue. Liberator was received well from critics for combining of superhero tropes with activist themes, and was praised by creators such as Scott Snyder and members of the punk and hardcore communities. Due to the success of Liberator, Miner then published Critical Hit in 2014. The comic is a follow-up story that delves deeper into the personal consequences and dilemmas faced by animal rights activists who seek direct action instead of protesting.

In 2014, Miner co-created Toe Tag Riot, a satirical horror comic about a punk rock zombie band that attacks hate groups, bigots, and misogynists. The comic received positive reviews for its humor, irreverence, and outspoken political edge, gaining wide attention in both comic and music circles. However, it gained negative attention from the Westboro Baptist Church after publication. Also in 2014, Miner collaborated with the hardcore band Earth Crisis on Liberator/Earth Crisis: Salvation of Innocents, a two-issue crossover comic that tied into the band's concept album of the same name. The story continued with the themes of animal liberation, set against the backdrop of dystopian cruelty and direct action.

In 2017, Miner then went on to co-write GWAR: Orgasmageddon, a sci-fi romp based on the metal band Gwar, which received praise for its chaotic energy known from the band. After doing a press tour with Gwar for the release of comic, Miner went on to write Poser in 2018, which became a four-issue horror series published by Waxwork Comics. The series has a strong punk rock aesthetic mixed in with slasher horror movie themes and is set in Southern California's underground punk scene. A 7″ vinyl soundtrack accompanies each issue that was composed by Joel Grind of Toxic Holocaust. Miner completed the Liberator series with the third and final comic Lab Raider in 2019.

In 2022, Miner released, along with his fellow co-editor and creator Joe Glass, Young Men in Love, an all-ages comic anthology published by A Wave Blue World. The collection of short stories brings together over 20 queer men or non-binary creators to tell stories focused on budding romance between cisgender men, transgender men, and/or non-binary partners across a wide variety of genres. The anthology was widely received for its inclusive and positive portrayal of queer romance, and for being an authentic publish work by queer men for queer men. Publishers Weekly highlighted the diversity of stories and styles, calling it a "satisfying collection of gay love narratives across genres" and has earned widespread success in the LGBTQ+ and comics communities. Following the success of the first volume, a follow-up anthology titled Young Men in Love: New Romance was launched in June 2025, continuing the theme with fresh queer creators and romantic tales that keep authenticity and queer joy at its core.

== Personal life ==
Miner studied in school with the goal of becoming a professional writer, but after a few failed attempts in writing proses, he turned to focusing on comics since he loved reading comic books as a child. Miner lives in Queens, New York, with his partner and several rescued animals.

== Awards and recognition ==
- 2026 Nominated for Ringo Award for Best Anthology for Young Men in Love: New Romance
- 2023: GLAAD Media Award for Young Men in Love in the category of Outstanding Original Graphic Novel/Anthology.
- 2023: Gayming Awards for Best LGBTQ Comic Book Moment for Young Men in Love.
- 2023: Ringo Award for Best Anthology for Young Men in Love.
- 2023: Nominated for Dwayne McDuffie Award for Diversity in Comics for Young Men in Love.
- 2022: Listed in The Mary Sue Best Comics & Graphic Novels of 2022 for Young Men in Love.

== Bibliography ==
=== Comic book series ===
- Liberator (Black Mask Studios, 2013) – 4-issue miniseries
- Liberator / Earth Crisis: Salvation of Innocents (Black Mask Studios / Earth Crisis, 2014) – 2-issue crossover
- Critical Hit (Black Mask Studios, 2014–2015) – 4-issue sequel to Liberator
- Toe Tag Riot (Black Mask Studios, 2014–2015) – 4-issue punk zombie horror miniseries
- GWAR: Orgasmageddon (Dynamite Entertainment, 2017) – 4-issue co-written miniseries
- Poser (Waxwork Comics, 2018–2022) – 4-issue punk slasher miniseries
- Lab Raider (Black Mask Studios, 2019) – 4-issue animal liberation thriller

=== Anthologies (as contributor or editor) ===
- This Nightmare Kills Fascists (A Wave Blue World, 2017) – co-editor and contributor
- All We Ever Wanted: Stories of a Better World (A Wave Blue World, 2019) – co-editor and contributor
- Young Men in Love (A Wave Blue World, 2022) – co-editor and contributor
- Young Men in Love: New Romance (A Wave Blue World, 2025) – co-editor and contributor

=== Collected editions ===
- Liberator (Black Mask Studios, 2014) – ISBN 978-0-991-07013-3
- Critical Hit (Black Mask Studios, 2015) – ISBN 978-1-939-32604-4
- Toe Tag Riot (Black Mask Studios, 2015) – ISBN 978-1-939-32607-5
- Lab Raider (Black Mask Studios, 2020) – ISBN 978-1-939-32657-0
- Poser (Waxwork Comics, 2022) – ISBN 978-1-732-25116-5
