= Viking (comics) =

2009 comic book series

Publication information
- Publisher: Image
- Schedule: Bi-Monthly
- Genre: Historical
- Publication date: April 2009 – January 2010
- No. of issues: 5

Creative team as of April 2009
- Created by: Ivan Brandon, Nic Klein
- Written by: Ivan Brandon
- Artist: Nic Klein
- Letterer(s): Kristyn Ferretti; Nic Klein; Tom Muller (cover design)
- Colorist: Nic Klein

Viking is a creator-owned comic book series published by Image Comics. It is written by its creator, Ivan Brandon, with art by Nic Klein.

== Publication history ==
The first issue appeared April 22, 2009 but had sold out before it went on sale.

The fifth issue appeared in January 2010, and finished the first arc. No more issues were published afterwards.

== Characters ==
- Aki - An enforcer for King Bram
- Annikki - Viking princess, Daughter of King Bram the Quiet
- Bork - A merchant / arms dealer
- Bram - A Viking king, he bears the title "The Quiet."
- Egil - A criminal raider of sorts, brother to Finn and Ketil.
- Finn - A criminal raider of sorts, brother to Egil and Ketil.
- Ketil - A young boy, the youngest of three children. Brother to Egil and Finn.
- Ozur - Egil, Finn, and Ketil's grandfather, an old man.

== Plot synopsis ==
=== Issue 1 ===
Date of Publication: 22 April 2009

Egil and Finn kill a group of Vikings led by a man named Knut, stealing their cache of weapons for their own purposes, leaving one messenger alive to tout their bravado. Upon reception of his message, this messenger is put to death by Aki and King Bram.

Princess Annikki meanwhile practices her archery in the woods as her father looks on. A large bear trundles from the woods and curiously inspects her. King Bram means to kill it for threatening his daughter, but is stopped by Annikki, who escapes the situation with little more than a series of scratches along her left cheek where the bear pawed her during its inspection.

The brothers Egil and Finn sell their ill-gotten goods to Bork the merchant, and visit their grandfather, Ozur, whereupon they take their younger brother Ketil out for a day of family recreation.

The boy recklessly charges about playing at being a raider, when the three brothers are set upon by another group of Vikings. This is the murdered Knut's brother and his men, who stab Ketil and begin savagely beating Egil. Finn charges into the fray as he draws his weapon, ending the first issue of the series.

== See also ==
- Northlanders, a comic book series about Vikings from Vertigo
