= Black Mask Studios =

American comic book publisher

- Status: Active
- Founded: 2012
- Country of origin: United States
- Headquarters location: Los Angeles, California
- Distribution: Simon & Schuster (books), Lunar Comics Distribution (comics), Diamond Comic Distributors (comics)
- Key people: Matt Pizzolo; Brett Gurewitz; Steve Niles
- Publication types: Comic books, books
- Official website: www.blackmaskstudios.com

Black Mask Studios is a comic book and graphic novel publishing company formed by Matt Pizzolo, Steve Niles and Brett Gurewitz, designed as a new infrastructure to support comic book creators and a new pipeline for transgressive art.

Black Mask is known for the miniseries Elisa Romboli's Alice In Leatherland, Matthew Rosenberg's 4 Kids Walk Into A Bank, Magdalene Visaggio's Kim & Kim, Matt Miner's Liberator, Tini Howard's The Skeptics, Vita Ayala's The Wilds, Curt Pires's Mayday, Amancay Nahuelpan's Clandestino, Fabian Rangel Jr.'s Space Riders, and Kwanza Osajyefo's White.

Comic book writer Matthew Rosenberg, the writer of Uncanny X-Men and Batman whose first comic book 4 Kids Walk Into A Bank was published by BM, appeared on the Word Balloon podcast with John Siuntres and he said:

"There's going to be a moment in this industry when Matt Pizzolo is really viewed as one of the great eyes for talent. Up there with, I don't want to say up there with Karen Berger just to not throw myself in with that, but regarding the talent that came out of Black Mask versus other indie publishers: so many good people got their start there. Tini Howard's first creator owned book is at Black Mask. Vita Ayala's first creator owned book is at Black Mask. My first creator owned book is at Black Mask. Alexis Ziritt. So many people doing great work. Like Tony Patrick and Mags Visaggio. Curt Pires. Zac Thompson and Lonnie Nadler. All these people who are doing great, fascinating, cool books. All these people who are doing stuff that I love can point to Black Mask as that was the first door that was opened. I think in the history books Black Mask is not going to dominate sales anytime soon, but the eye for talent has been really impeccable."

Host John Siuntres agreed. "It's a great roster and responsible for a lot of the great new voices in comics."

According to publicly available data, Black Mask's top five bestselling series include Calexit, Godkiller, Black, 4 Kids Walk Into A Bank, and Rogue State. Black Mask's top reviewed debut issue of a new series is currently Young Terrorists #1 followed by a tie between Ballistic #1 and CalExit #1, and its top reviewed collected standalone story is currently a three-way tie between 4 Kids Walk Into A Bank, We Can Never Go Home, and The Dregs. The first Black Mask series to be adapted into a feature film is 4 Kids Walk Into A Bank starring Liam Neeson, to be released by Amazon Studios in 2026.

== History ==
On March 20, 2012, it was announced that Occupy Comics, the charity comic book inspired by and raising funds for Occupy Wall Street, organized by Pizzolo, would not be released through an existing comic book publisher, but through a new company called Black Mask Studios.

Niles and Gurewitz joined with Pizzolo to found Black Mask, Niles noting "if V for Vendetta were created today there would be no publisher for it." Pizzolo has explained that Black Mask will operate under the mottos "to create you must destroy" and "Inspire, never meddle".

On June 12, 2012, Black Mask Studios opened its webstore and officially released Occupy Comics No. 1 with the announcement that Pulitzer Prize-winner Art Spiegelman, Bill Ayers, Ryan Alexander-Tanner, Jimmy Palmiotti, and Matt Bors had joined the book's roster.

On September 17, 2012, the one-year anniversary of Occupy Wall Street, Occupy Comics No. 2 was released to the project's Kickstarter backers and via the Black Mask Studios website. The cover featured a new and iconic illustration by V For Vendetta artist David Lloyd pitting his seminal character V against the Wall Street Charging Bull.

Nearly a year later, on February 14, 2013, Black Mask Studios unveiled its first slate of comics with a two-pronged distribution strategy of supplying comics to traditional comic book shops as well as direct-to-fan through digital-physical hybrid subscriptions.

The following year, in October 2014, Black Mask Studios announced its second slate of 15 new series, a major expansion for the company, flagshipped by Sinatoro from Grant Morrison and Vanesa Del Rey and Disciples from Steve Niles and Christopher Mitten.

Black Mask Studios has since announced several non-comics productions: a TV adaptation of Five Ghosts by Frank Barbiere and Chris Mooneyham, executive produced by Pizzolo and Gurewitz for Syfy and Universal Cable Productions with a pilot by Evan Daugherty; an animated feature film trilogy of Godkiller by Pizzolo, Anna Muckcracker Wieszczyk and Ben Templesmith, a TV adaptation of The Disciples by Niles and Christopher Mitten at Universal Cable Productions, a TV adaptation of Mayday at Imperative, and an adaptation of Sinatoro by Grant Morrison and Vanesa Del Rey at Universal Television with a pilot by Heroes writers Adam Armus and Kay Foster, co-produced with Chris Weitz (Rogue One) and Paul Weitz (Mozart in the Jungle). According to The Hollywood Reporter, Black Mask currently has 11 projects in development at studios.

Warner Bros. Pictures announced that it is developing a feature film universe based on the comic book series BLACK set to be directed by Gerard McMurray (The First Purge, Burning Sands). Sony Pictures Television announced that Black Mask is producing an animated series adaptation of the comic book series Faust set to be written by Matt Pizzolo (Godkiller). Picturestart announced that it is developing a feature film based on the comic book series 4 Kids Walk Into A Bank set to be written by Matthew Robinson (Edge of Tomorrow, Rogue Squadron).

== Titles ==
The first slate of titles was scheduled to launch on May Day 2013 with Occupy Comics No. 1.

The second slate of titles began debuting in late 2014 with new series scheduled to launch through mid-2015.

The third slate of titles (dubbed Black Mask's Class Of 2016) debuted in Spring 2016.

In May 2017, it was announced that Black Mask title Kim & Kim earned the company its first Eisner Award nomination.

Black Mask Studios announced in February 2017 that a new comic Calexit will be released in May 2017, which will be about the Pacific Coast Sister Cities Resistance in a California under martial law by the President of the United States set in an occupied Los Angeles.

Year	Title	Author(s)	Artist(s)	Notes
2013	Occupy Comics	Various	Various	
2013	12 Reasons To Die	Matthew Rosenberg and Patrick Kindlon	Various	Created by Wu-Tang Clan's Ghostface Killah, producer Adrian Younge, and executive producer RZA
2013	Ballistic	Adam Egypt Mortimer	Darick Robertson, Diego Rodriguez	Created by The Boys co-creator Darick Robertson. USA Today: Best of the Year Honorable Mention for "Most Insane Read Of The Year"
2013	Liberator	Matt Miner	Javier Aranda, Joaquin Pereyra	
2014	Toe Tag Riot	Matt Miner	Sean Von Gorman	Featuring Andy Hurley of Fall Out Boy.
2014	Godkiller	Matt Pizzolo	Anna Muckcracker Wieszczyk, Ben Templesmith (covers)	Kirkus Reviews: Starred review, Best Books Of The Year List. Diamond Comic Distributors: #1 on Advanced Reorder Charts. Number of printings: 3.
2014	Godkiller: Walk Among Us	Matt Pizzolo	Anna Wieszczyk	
2014	Critical Hit	Matt Miner	Jonathan Brandon Sawyer	
2014	Pirouette	Mark Miller	Carlos Granda	
2014	Last Born	Patrick Meaney	Eric Zawadzki	
2015	We Can Never Go Home	Matthew Rosenberg and Patrick Kindlon	Josh Hood	Diamond Comic Distributors Gem Award winner: Best Graphic Novel of the Year. Number of printings: 3.
2015	Mayday	Curt Pires	Chris Peterson	
2015	Space Riders (volume 1)	Fabian Rangel Jr.	Alexis Ziritt	Number of printings: 3.
2015	The Disciples	Steve Niles	Christopher Mitten	Number of printings: 2.
2015	Transference	Michael Moreci	Ron Salas	Number of printings: 2.
2015	Young Terrorists	Matt Pizzolo	Amancay Nahuelpan	Publishers Weekly: Bestselling Indie Graphic Novel of the Year (#1 Mature Readers, #2 Marketwide). Amazon #1 Bestseller. Number of printings: 4.
2015	Clandestino	Amancay Nahuelpan	Amancay Nahuelpan	Number of printings: 2.
2015	X'ed	Tony Dreannan	Ayhan Hayrula	
2016	Jade Street Protection Services	Katy Rex and Fabian Lelay	Fabian Lelay, Mara Jayne Carpenter, Annie Wu (covers)	Number of printings: 2.
2016	Kim & Kim	Magdalene Visaggio	Eva Cabrera, Claudia Aguirre, Tess Fowler and Devaki Neogi (covers)	Eisner Award and GLAAD Media Award-nominated Issue 1, First printing sales: 20,000. Number of printings: 2.
2016	BLACK	Kwanza Osajyefo	Jamal Igle, Khary Randolph (covers)	Designed by Tim Smith III. Cover of The New York Times Arts Section. Issue 1, First printing sales: 22,000. Number of printings: 2.
2016	The Skeptics	Tini Howard	Devaki Neogi, Jen Hickman	Number of printings: 2.
2016	4 Kids Walk into A Bank	Matthew Rosenberg	Tyler Boss	Acclaimed in The New York Times Book Review section. Issue 1, First printing sales: 31,000. Number of printings: 3.
2016	The Forevers	Curt Pires	Eric Pfeiffer	
2016	No Angel	Eric Palicki and Adrianne Palicki	Ari Syahrazad, Jean-Paul Csuka	Number of printings: 2.
2017	The Dregs	Zac Thompson and Lonnie Nadler	Eric Zawadzki	Number of printings: 2.
2017	Space Riders: Galaxy of Brutality (volume 2)	Fabian Rangel Jr	Alexis Ziritt	Number of printings: 2.
2017	Last Song	Holly Interlandi	Zoe Chevat	
2017	Beautiful Canvas	Ryan K Lindsay	Sami Kivela, Sami Kivela, Sami Kivela, Triona Farrell	
2017	Calexit	Matteo Pizzolo	Amancay Nahuelpan, Tyler Boss	Publishers Weekly: Starred Review. Amazon Bestseller. Cover of The New York Times Arts Section. Issue 1, First printing sales: 25,000. Number of printings: 5.
2017	Gravetrancers	M.L. Miller	James Michael Whynot	
2017	Quantum Teens Are Go	Magdalene Visaggio	Eryk Donovan	
2017	There's Nothing There	Patrick Kindlon	Maria Llovet	Number of printings: 2.
2018	America's Sweetheart	Kwanza Osajyefo	Jennifer Johnson	BLACK spin-off
2018	The Wilds	Vita Ayala	Emily Pearson	
2018	Come Into Me	Zac Thompson and Lonnie Nadler	Piotr Kowalski	
2018	BLACK [AF]: Widows And Orphans	Kwanza Osajyefo	Tim Smith III	BLACK spin-off
2018	Breathless	Pat Shand	Renzo Rodriguez	
2018	BLACK [AF]: Devil's Dye	Vita Ayala	Liana Kangas, Maika Sozo	BLACK spin-off
2018	Devil Within	Stephanie Phillips	Maan House, Tula Lotay (cover)	Number of printings: 2.
2018	Eternal	Ryan K Lindsay	Eric Zawadzki	
2018	Survival Fetish	Patrick Kindlon	Antonio Fuso	
2018	Sex Death Revolution	Magdalene Visaggio	Becca Farrow, Kasia Witerscheim, Kiki Jenkins (covers)	
2018	We Are The Danger	Fabian Lelay	Fabian Lelay	
2018	Calexit: All Systems San Diego	Matteo Pizzolo	Carlos Granda	Calexit spin-off
2019	Space Riders: Vortex of Darkness (volume 3)	Fabian Rangel Jr	Alexis Ziritt	
2019	Snap Flash Hustle	Pat Shand	Emily Pearson	Number of printings: 2.
2019	Lab Raider	Matt Miner	Creees Lee	
2019	Nobody Is In Control	Patrick Kindlon	Paul Tucker	
2020	LOUD	Maria Llovet	Maria Llovet	Number of printings: 3.
2021	WHITE	Kwanza Osajyefo	Jamal Igle, Khary Randolph, Tim Smith, Derwin Roberson	Sequel to BLACK. Issue 1, First printing sales: 40,000. Number of printings: 3.
2021	Alice In Leatherland	Iolanda Zanfardino	Elisa Romboli, Elisa Romboli	Amazon #1 Bestseller. Number of printings: 3.
2021	Destiny, NY	Pat Shand	Jenn St-Onge, Elisa Romboli, Manuel Preitano, Rosi Kampe	Number of printings: 2.
2021	Godkiller: Tomorrow's Ashes	Matt Pizzolo	Anna Wieszczyk, Jen Bartel and Tess Fowler (covers)	Issue 1, First printing sales: Over 40,000. Number of printings: 4.
2021	Everfrost	Ryan K Lindsay	Sami Kivela	
2022	Godkiller: Spiderland	Matt Pizzolo	Anna Wieszczyk, Nen Chang (covers)	Number of printings: 3.
2022	Hecate's Will	Iolanda Zanfardino	Iolanda Zanfardino	
2022	Calexit: Our Last Night In America	Matteo Pizzolo	Carlos Granda	Calexit spin-off
2022	Rogue State	Matteo Pizzolo	Chuck D, Soo Lee, Ashley A Woods, C. Granda (covers)	Issue 1, First printing sales: Over 48,000. Held five of the Top 12 spots on Comichron Advanced Reorder Charts. Number of printings: 4.
2022	Gangster Ass Barista	Conor Hughes	Renzo Rodriguez, Elisa Romboli (covers)	
2023	Godkiller: For Those I Love I Will Sacrifice	Matt Pizzolo	Anna Muckcracker	Number of printings: 2.
2023	Destiny, NY: Mystic Mafia	Pat Shand	Elisa Romboli	
2023	Don't Avert Your Eyes	Patrick Kindlon	Valentina Pinti, Simone Sellecchia, Andy Duggan, Kelsi Jo Silva, Lesley Leirix Li (cover), Maria Llovet (cover)	There's Nothing There spin-off
2024	Faust: Love of the Damned	David Quinn	Tim Vigil, Tim Tyler, Tom Brunton, Augie Pagan	
2024	How To Steal An Election (Before Someone Else Does)	Matteo Pizzolo	Elisa Pocetta	
2024	Godkiller: The Color You Took From Her Eyes	Matt Pizzolo	Anna Muckcracker	Preview
2025	Calexit: The Battle Of Universal City	Matteo Pizzolo	C. Granda	Calexit sequel. Number of printings: 3.
2025	Nightvision	David Quinn	Hannibal King, Tim Vigil, Kyle Hotz	
2025	Calexit: L For Luigi	Matteo Pizzolo	Elisa Pocetta	Calexit spin-off.
2025	General Strike	Grant Morrison, Brian Michael Bendis, Matt Pizzolo, Judalina Nera, Jeff Perreca, Tamara Becher-Wilkinson	Jamal Igle, Michael Avon Oeming, Joshua Hood, Elisa Pocetta, Butch Mapa, C. Granda, Tyler Boss, Ben Templesmith, Creees Lee, Elisa Romboli, Iolanda Zanfardino, Darick Robertson, Amancay Nahuelpan	
2025	Calexit: The Battle Of San Onofre	Matteo Pizzolo	Butch Mapa	Calexit spin-off.
2026	Leaded Gasoline	Patrick Kindlon	Lorenzo Re	Preview
2026	Calexit: Say Goodbye To Hollywood	Matteo Pizzolo	C. Granda	Calexit sequel. Announced for Spring 2026 launch.

=== Unproduced ===
Title	Author(s)	Artist(s)	Notes
Sinatoro	Grant Morrison	Vanesa del Rey	Announced in 2014
Our Work Fills The Pews	Vita Ayala and Matthew Rosenberg	Yasmin Liang	Announced in 2016, "retooling" as of 2019
Run for the Shadows	J.M. DeMatteis and Matt Pizzolo	Josh Hood	Announced in 2016
We Can Never Go Home (volume 2)	Matthew Rosenberg and Patrick Kindlon	Josh Hood	
