= War Is Boring =

Online news outlet

War Is Boring is an online news outlet which specializes in coverage of defense and international relations.

== History ==
War Is Boring's origins are in 2007, when David Axe began writing a webcomic called War Is Boring which was illustrated by cartoonist Matt Bors.

The publication gained particular attention for its coverage of the defense industry, especially Lockheed Martin's F-35 Joint Strike Fighter program.

In May 2015, Medium made significant changes to its company structure. This included massive funding cuts in the editorial department. Medium shut down several publications and forced many others to cut longtime editors and writers. War Is Boring's budget was heavily slashed, most of the staff was laid off and story output greatly decreased. Before long, Axe publicly announced that War Is Boring was searching for a new publisher.

In July 2015, War Is Boring and Reuters launched the War College podcast, a joint venture hosted by Reuters opinion editor Jason Fields and War Is Boring contributing editor Matthew Gault.

David Axe left War Is Boring in 2019.

== Notable stories ==
=== F-35 "dogfight leak" ===
In 2015, Axe obtained a leaked testing report written by a pilot that recounted how the F-35 Joint Strike Fighter the tester was flying was unable to outmaneuver an F-16 fighter it was facing off against in a simulated dogfight, the report circulated widely in defense publications and mainstream media outlets. While the Pentagon admitted that the fighter was only designed to be “comparable to current tactical fighters in terms of maneuverability,” the spokesperson insisted that Axe "did not tell the entire story” and thus was misrepresentating the facts.

Then-Republican presidential candidate Donald Trump cited War Is Boring's coverage during an interview with Hugh Hewitt in which he argued the F-35 program should be cancelled. This possibly helped spur a showdown between Trump and Lockheed Martin execs that Trump claimed reduced the cost of the program, though several analysts have questioned the savings.

=== Civilian casualties in Syria and Iraq ===
War Is Boring reporter Joseph Trevithick obtained U.S. military documents that revealed possible mistakes by Canadian pilots in the war against the Islamic State that could have resulted in greater civilian casualties than initially reported.

After breaking the story, War Is Boring worked with the Airwars project to share the documents with The Guardian, the Canadian Broadcasting Corporation, the Australian Broadcasting Corporation and the Dutch-language RTL Nieuws. CBC's The Fifth Estate would go on to incorporate the data into a larger investigative feature.

=== "Narin Afrin photo" controversy ===
During the siege of Kobanî, a photo taken by British freelance photographer Matt Cetti-Roberts (at the time working with War Is Boring) of YPJ snipers in the town of Rabia became widely shared by activists on social media claiming it depicted female Kurdish guerilla leader Narin Afrin, who was apparently in charge of Kobanî's defense. The photo soon became a meme. War Is Boring's Iraq coverage editor Kevin Knodell wrote a post clarifying the photo's origin, and asserted that the woman in the photo was highly unlikely to be Afrin. The photo, as well as comments by Knodell and Cetti-Roberts on Twitter became a subject of debate in both French and Kurdish media.

"People have very sudden, very emotional responses to things they see on the internet, and they share them with friends and families [...] But sometimes they do that without checking on facts, or seeing if there's any truth to what they are seeing or reading. Social media is a great thing, but it has its downsides too", War Is Boring's Iraq coverage editor Kevin Knodell told Kurdish media outlet Rudaw.
