= Fearless (comics) =

- Cover of the first issue

Publication information
- Publisher: Image Comics
- Format: Limited series
- Genre: Superhero
- Publication date: 2007
- No. of issues: 4

Fearless is four-issue limited series is written by Mark Sable and David Roth, with art by PJ Holden, and is published by Image Comics.

The series is the story of Adam Rygert, a superhero who must depend on an anti-fear drug to keep his crippling anxiety at bay.
