= Godkiller =

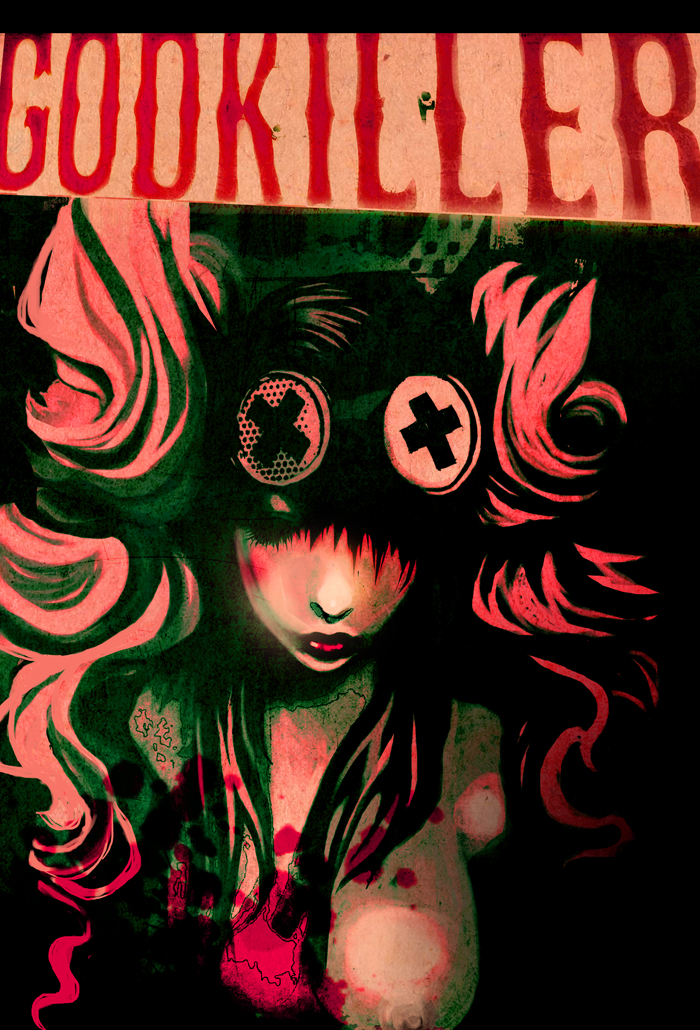
- Cover of Godkiller: Walk Among Us #2. Art by Anna Muckcracker Wieszczyk.

Publication information
- Publisher: Halo 8 Comics (2008-2013); Black Mask Studios (2014-present)
- Genre: Horror
- Publication date: 2008-present

Creative team
- Written by: Matt Pizzolo
- Penciller: Anna Muckcracker Wieszczyk

Godkiller: Walk Among Us [illustrated film]
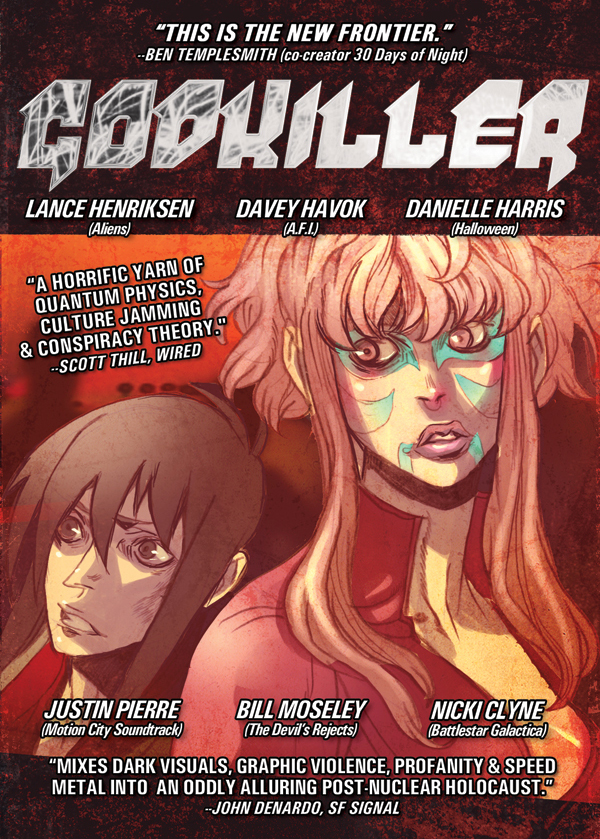
- DVD box. Designed by Robert Anthony Jr. Illustration: Anna Muckcracker Wieszczyk.
- Directed by: Matt Pizzolo
- Written by: Matt Pizzolo
- Based on: Godkiller by: Matt Pizzolo; Anna Muckcracker Wieszczyk
- Produced by: Brian Giberson
- Starring: Lance Henriksen; Danielle Harris; Davey Havok; Justin Courtney Pierre; Bill Moseley; Lydia Lunch; Tiffany Shepis; Katie Nisa; Nicki Clyne
- Edited by: Brian Giberson
- Music by: Alec Empire; Nic Endo; Atari Teenage Riot
- Distributed by: Warner Bros.; Warner Music Group; Rykodisc; Gravitas Ventures; Halo 8 Entertainment
- Release dates: April 20, 2010 (C2E2); May 28, 2010 (United States)
- Running time: 88 minutes
- Country: United States
- Language: English

Godkiller is a transmedia series of graphic novels, illustrated films, and novels created by filmmaker Matt Pizzolo that tells the stories of human beings caught in the crossfire of warring fallen gods.

The core series is a trilogy of feature-length illustrated films beginning with Godkiller: Walk Among Us, illustrated by Anna Muckcracker and featuring performances by Lance Henriksen, Davey Havok (lead singer of AFI), Danielle Harris, Bill Moseley, Lydia Lunch, Nicki Clyne, and Justin Pierre (lead singer of Motion City Soundtrack). The series is particularly notable for its use of experimental and innovative media formats, such as the illustrated film format Pizzolo developed with producer Brian Giberson that merges sequential art with 3D CGI, motion graphics and dramatic voice performances in the style of a radio play.

In 2010, following an underground release by Halo 8 as episodic shortform DVDs, the complete illustrated film was distributed wide by Warner Bros.

The October 2009 illustrated film DVD Godkiller: Walk Among Us - Episode 1 quickly established itself as its distributor's all-time fastest-selling release.

In January 2012, the first issue of the Godkiller 2: Tomorrow's Ashes comic book series debuted as a digital series.

Godkiller returned in 2014 as a monthly paper comic book series from Black Mask Studios.

In November 2014, it was reported that Godkiller would be rebooted as an animated feature film trilogy directed by Pizzolo.

Godkiller returned to comic book stores in July 2021 with the sequel Godkiller: Tomorrow's Ashes #1. The painted cover by Nen Chang immediately became the publisher's all-time bestseller. With an initial print run over 40,000, it sold out in its first day of release. The publisher rushed a second printing to stores with a new cover by artist Yasmin Flores Montanez.

== Publication/Production history ==
Pizzolo said about the inspiration behind Godkiller:

I thought it would be fun to design a new mythology for fuck-ups and misfits. My goal with it is to present heroes that don't behave heroically because it's their job to maintain the status quo or because they're bored and want to rescue a princess, they act heroically because they're regular misfits who are trying to do the best they can for each other in an unjust, fucked-up world.

=== Core series ===
The Godkiller series was devised to be simultaneously produced as a series of graphic novels and films (both utilizing the same sequential art) with the ultimate goal being a trilogy of feature-length films. Pizzolo and Muckcracker began by serializing Godkiller: Walk Among Us into a 6-issue comic book series (debuting in 2008) and a 3-episode film series (debuting in 2009) before the completed Walk Among Us feature film opened theatrically in 2010.

The Walk Among Us film was slated for a unique release of limited edition, bi-monthly DVDs starting September 29, 2009, followed by a theatrical run of the full feature in January 2010 and a DVD/Blu-ray release in March 2010.

Due to overwhelming demand far beyond studio expectations, the first DVD's street date was delayed until October 6, 2009, so enough DVDs could be supplied to the stores, including Best Buy, Borders Books, F.Y.E. and Suncoast, among many more retailers.

Pizzolo and Muckcracker are currently working on the second part of the trilogy, Godkiller: Tomorrow's Ashes. The new series was slated to be released in mid-2011, followed soon after by the next wave of films. The complete Tomorrow's Ashes feature-length film was expected to premiere theatrically in 2011.

=== Additional series ===
==== Godkiller: Silent War ====
Pizzolo also wrote the serialized, pre-apocalyptic prequel Godkiller: Silent War, an urban fantasy novel series which debuted as episodic e-books & audiobooks on the special features of the Godkiller: Walk Among Us DVDs in October 2009.

Pizzolo explained the dramatic structure to Dread Central:

Godkiller is split into two periods ... there's the pre-nuke world of Silent War and there's the post-nuke world of the graphic novel and illustrated film Walk Among Us. So Silent War is only a prequel insofar as it happens beforehand, but its events drive the Walk Among Us story, and many of the same characters appear in both. I'm super excited that the two stories can roll out together in this integrated way--everything about this project is unorthodox and crazy, hopefully everyone will enjoy the ride.

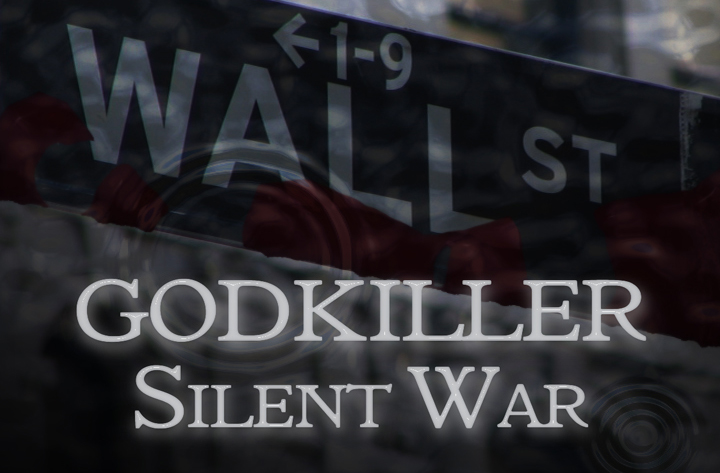
Godkiller: Silent War audiobook cover (2009).

The early chapters of Silent War (from October 2009 to March 2010) depicted chaotic, youth-driven protests on Wall Street and are now considered prescient of the Occupy Wall Street movement that began in September 2011. The protest scenes were illustrated by Muckcracker in mid-2011 as flashbacks in the comic book Godkiller: Tomorrow's Ashes - Spiderland and bear an uncanny resemblance to Occupy imagery. Pizzolo talked to Bleeding Cool about how the images of violent street protest, including a lynching of the Wall Street Charging Bull, were not widely considered predictive at the time of their initial release.

We start tying in the events of Silent War in Spiderland. Silent War was previously a serialized prequel novella included on the Walk Among Us DVDs as e-books and audiobooks. I wrote it back in 2009 and some of the core plot takes place among young radicals protesting on Wall Street. The pages in Spiderland look like they're directly lifted from Occupy Wall Street, but Anna actually illustrated those pages last summer before Occupy started. It's funny because when Silent War started coming out people were telling me they didn't believe there would be a populist youth movement targeting Wall Street, but now when Spiderland comes out everyone will be like oh yeah that's so obvious haha.

==== The Long Knives ====
Pizzolo has indicated that his 2010 graphic novel series The Long Knives takes place in a shared universe with Godkiller and deals with several key Godkiller characters during the breakdown of society that precedes Godkiller: Walk Among Us. The Long Knives is a Giallo-style horror illustrated by newcomer Ana Ludeshka.

Ludeshka told Bloody Disgusting:

I was very shocked when I first read the Long Knives script. And not only because of the blood and the gore. There's no mercy in this story. It burns like cold things burn.

== Plot ==
=== Pre-nuke period ===
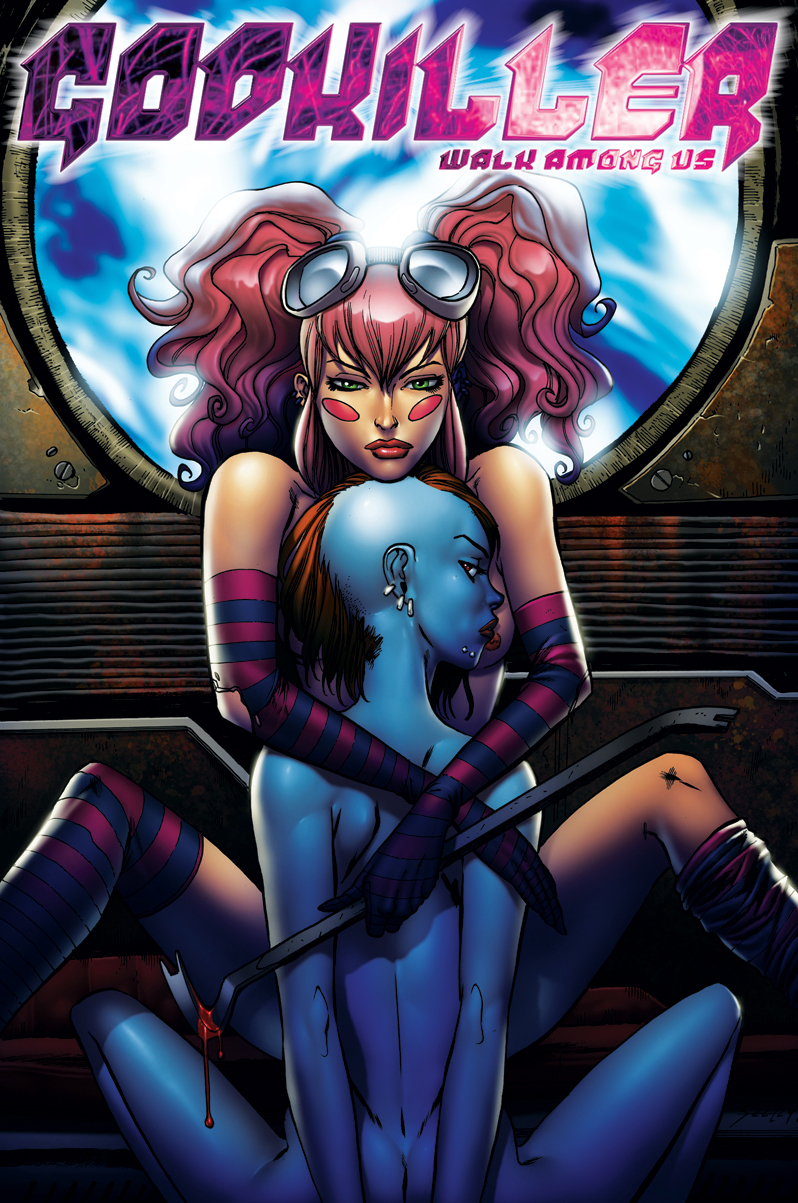
Godkiller (Hot Topic exclusive limited edition) episode-1 DVD cover by Tim Seeley (2009).

==== Godkiller: Silent War ====
In the near future, 17-year-old Joe Junior and his girlfriend Bee run a speakeasy in the basement of an abandoned NYC church where they serve narcotic drinks to underagers while providing sanctuary and black-market employment to draft dodgers. When Joe is recruited by an armed cult of populist assassins, he is thrust into a secret world of international cabals, alien conspiracies, and the countdown to Armageddon.

==== The Long Knives ====
A deadly viral pandemic is tearing America apart. Amid the looting and lawlessness, a murderous gang of awol black ops is abducting children but no one knows why. 16-year-old Bird winds up in their clutches.

=== Post-nuke period ===
==== Godkiller: Walk Among Us ====
Set in the future after an economic collapse, a nuclear holy war and an alien invasion, Godkiller: Walk Among Us follows orphan Tommy as he searches for a new heart for his ill sister, Lucy.

==== Godkiller: Tomorrow's Ashes ====
The story continues Tommy's quest from Godkiller: Walk Among Us.

== Formats ==
=== Illustrated film format ===
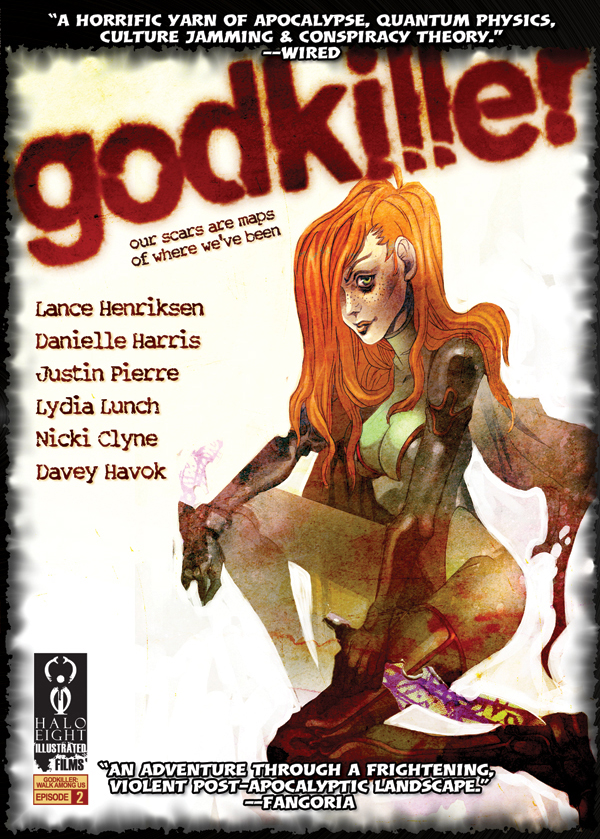
Godkiller: Walk Among Us shortform episode-2 DVD cover (2010).

Pizzolo developed the concept of an illustrated film with his producing partner Brian Giberson, mixing elements of anime, radio drama, video games, and motion comics. Utilizing the original artwork from the comic book, the illustrated film adds motion animation, visual effects, elaborate sound design, music, and voice-acting performances.

Wired asked Pizzolo to explain the differences between motion comics and illustrated films:

In illustrated films, we drive the pace of the storytelling with the dramatic voice performances and the sound design, so that allows us to showcase the illustrations in a way where you can really take a moment to absorb the art in the same way you can when reading a comic book ... Motion comics are closer to a form of limited animation that uses comics as source material. Illustrated films are closer to the experimental cinema of Ralph Bakshi's work, Chris Marker's La jetée or animation like Liquid Television.

Pizzolo gave Bloody Disgusting additional thoughts on differences between motion comics and illustrated films:

The simple answer is illustrated-films are an attempt to merge comic book sequential art with cinematic storytelling, whereas motion comics seem more intent on re-purposing comic books into cartoons. And I don't mean to sound like a dick because I think motion comics are cool, these are just different. On first glance, they look very similar ... and people might say 'it's moving comics on a screen, that's motion comics' to which I say 'just because Seinfeld is moving people captured on 35mm film doesn't make it the same thing as Full Metal Jacket'. On one level you could see motion comics and illustrated films as siblings like comics books vs graphics novels or TV shows vs feature films, but there are deeper distinctions. Basically, we're filmmakers so we're bringing a cinematic sensibility to this... We animate motion in the frame, but the need for motion is different in film ... it's not like Michael Madsen bounces around the frame in Reservoir Dogs the way Wakko does in Animaniacs.

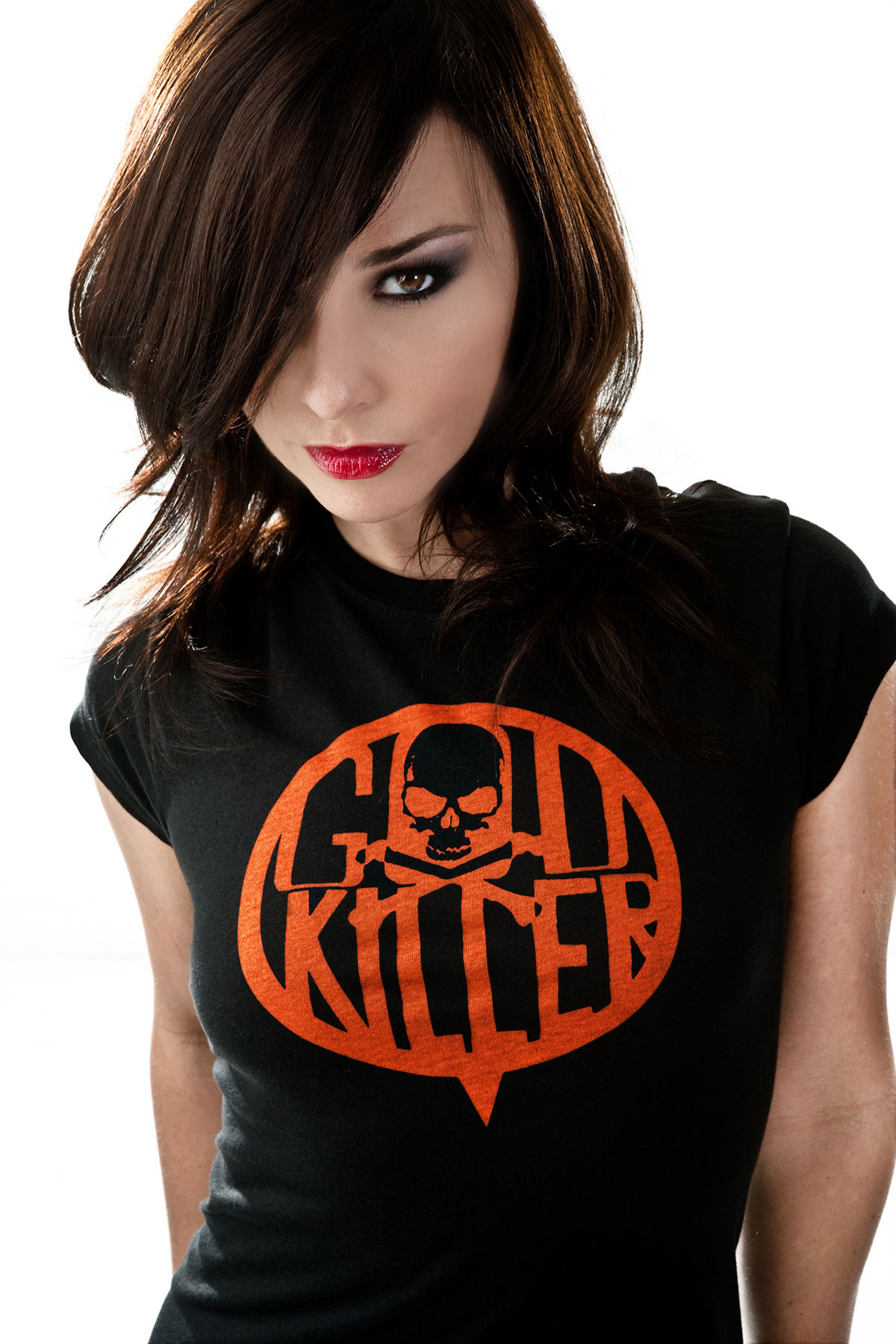
Danielle Harris voiced Halfpipe in the illustrated film and modeled for this exclusive chase-variant cover of Godkiller issue #1, photo by Jon Weiner.

Explaining the decision to develop the new filmmaking format, Pizzolo told Bloody Disgusting:

When we decided to make an anime adaptation of the comic book, I couldn't see how a traditional animated approach would do justice to Anna's incredibly lush and detailed illustrations. It made perfect sense to adapt the medium to suit her art, rather than vice versa.

Pizzolo clarified further in an interview with Horror News:

There are lots of reasons [Godkiller was made as an illustrated film], but I think the most important one was really being inspired by Anna Muckcracker's gorgeous artwork. Brian Giberson (my partner at Halo-8) and I had been experimenting with the illustrated film format for a while, but we might still have gone with traditional animation for Godkiller since it's really risky to experiment with a crazy story and a new filmmaking format at the same time. But once I saw Anna's art I knew that no traditional form of animation could do justice to the grimy, textured, surreal aesthetic she created. It was really an artistic choice, because from a business point of view it's just so risky.

According to Fangoria, "Lance Henriksen, Bill Moseley and Tiffany Shepis are the genre stalwarts lending their vocal talents to the project; also on board in that capacity are underground cinema queen Lydia Lunch and singers Justin Pierre (of Motion City Soundtrack) and Davey Havok (of AFI)".

Pizzolo and Giberson unveiled a preview clip of the Godkiller illustrated film during the "Comic Books & Indie Movies" panel at Comic-Con International's Wondercon in San Francisco on February 28, 2009.

According to Shock Till You Drop, "Danielle Harris (known for her turns in the Halloween franchise), Katie Nisa (Threat), and Nicki Clyne (Battlestar Galactica) have joined previously announced cast members Lance Henriksen, Bill Moseley, Tiffany Shepis, Justin Pierre (singer of Motion City Soundtrack), Lydia Lunch (Richard Kern's 'Hardcore Collection'), and Davey Havok (AFI) in the cast of the 'illustrated film' adaptation Godkiller, written and directed by award-winning filmmaker Matt Pizzolo (Threat) based on the comic book he created with illustrator Anna Muckcracker."

Pizzolo, Giberson and actresses Danielle Harris and Tiffany Shepis presented two exclusive preview clips of the Godkiller illustrated film at Fangoria's Weekend of Horrors in Los Angeles on April 18, 2009.

Immediately following the preview clip debut at Weekend of Horrors, Fangoria posted the first exclusive online clip of Godkiller on its website.

The film premiered on April 20, 2010 in Chicago as part of the Comic-Con C2E2.
