= We Will Bury You =

Comic book series

- Issue 3 cover by Trevor Hutchison

Publication information
- Publisher: IDW Comics
- Publication date: February 2010
- No. of issues: 4

Creative team
- Written by: Brea Grant, Zane Grant
- Artist: Kyle Strahm
- Letterer: Robbie Robbins
- Colorist: Zac Atkinson
- Editor: Denton J. Tipton

We Will Bury You is a comic book miniseries written by brother–sister team Brea Grant and Zane Grant. The first issue was published in the United States on February 24, 2010. The fourth and final issue was published in June 2010.

== Plot ==
We Will Bury You is a story of two lesbian lovers, Miyah and Fanya, set in a zombie-ridden alternate version of the 1920s. Unlike many zombie stories, We Will Bury You does not focus on the main characters’ struggle to survive when besieged by a horde of zombies. Instead, the story concentrates on the lovers' relationship and their travels as the roles of women in society change.
