= Grounded (comics) =

- Cover of the first issue

Publication information
- Publisher: Image Comics
- Format: Limited series
- Publication date: 2005
- No. of issues: 6

Creative team
- Created by: Mark Sable

Grounded is a coming-of-age story by Mark Sable and Paul Azaceta about a boy without super-powers who is sent to a high-school for super-powered teens. It was originally published as a six-issue limited series by Image Comics and was later collected in a trade paperback edition.
