= David Axe =

American military correspondent (born 1978)

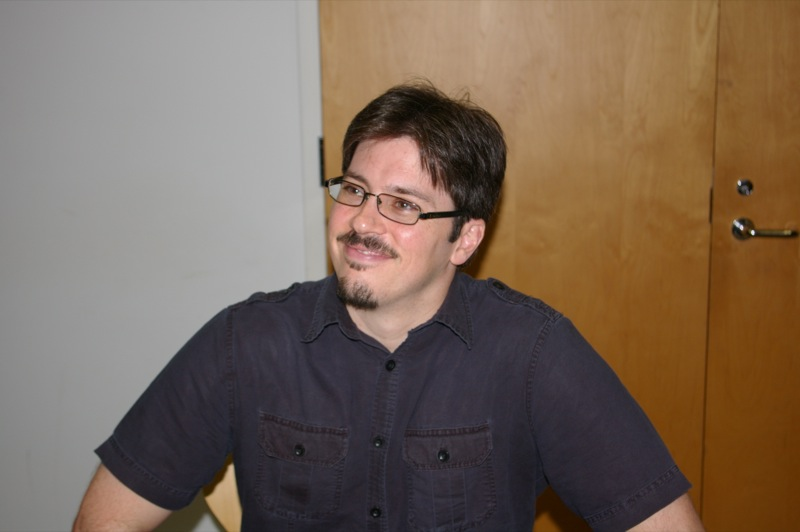
- Axe in 2011
- Born: April 11, 1978 (age 48); Arlington, Texas, U.S.
- Education: Furman University (BA); University of South Carolina (MA)
- Occupations: Military correspondent; blogger; graphic novelist

David Axe (born April 11, 1978) is an American military correspondent, blogger, and graphic novelist. Axe founded the website War Is Boring in 2007 as a webcomic, and later developed it into a news blog.

== Early life and education ==
David Axe was born on April 11, 1978, in Arlington, Texas. He attended Eisenhower High School from 1992 to 1996. After graduation, he enrolled at Furman University and earned a bachelor's degree in history in 2000. Then he went to the University of Virginia to study medieval history before transferring to and graduating from the University of South Carolina with a master's degree in fiction in 2004.

== Journalism ==
Axe was engaged in freelance writing before joining the Columbia, South Carolina-based weekly newspaper Free Times to cover county politics. In late 2004, he persuaded his editor to let him cover South Carolina guardsmen's deployment to the Iraq War and moved to Iraq in January 2005. Leaving the Free Times soon after, Axe continued to work in Iraq as a war correspondent for The Village Voice, The Washington Times, C-SPAN, BBC Radio, Popular Science, Fast Company, and Cosmopolitan.

Beginning in 2007, Axe began writing a webcomic called War Is Boring and illustrated by cartoonist Matt Bors.

The publication gained particular attention for its coverage of the defense industry, especially Axe's coverage of Lockheed Martin's controversial F-35 Joint Strike Fighter program.

In 2012, Axe reported in The Diplomat that U.S. special operations on the Korean Peninsula may have been infiltrating North Korea to gather intelligence based on quotes he attributed to U.S. Army Brigadier General Neil Tolley. U.S. officials condemned the report, accusing Axe of making up quotes and attributing them to Tolley. Retired Navy SEAL Brandon Webb circulated a suicide note ostensibly written and signed by Axe, which depicted him killing himself in shame for making up the story. The note circulated on Twitter and Facebook and caused rumors of its authenticity. Webb later took Axe's name off it and said that it was meant to be satirical. Several other reporters who were in the same room publicly came to Axe's defense, saying they heard the same things and that Axe's story accurately quoted Tolley's remarks. Tolley stated that Axe had misquoted him as he was speaking hypothetically.

David Axe left War Is Boring in 2019.

Axe was a member of the staff of Forbes from 2020 to May 2025 as a war correspondent. As of June 2025 he writes for Euromaidan Press.
