= Mark Sable =

American writer

- Mark Sable
- Born: Mark A. Sable; June 22, 1975 (age 51)
- Education: Duke University (BA); New York University (MFA); University of California, Los Angeles (MBA); University of Southern California (JD)
- Occupation: Writer
- Notable work: Grounded; Fearless; Hazed

Mark A. Sable (born June 22, 1975) is an American writer for stage, screen, and comic books.

== Biography ==
Mark Sable is a writer for comics, film and television, best known for such creator-owned comics as Image Comics "Graveyard of Empires" and Boom! Studios "Unthinkable". Sable graduated cum laude with B.A. in English from Duke University, and received an M.F.A. in Dramatic Writing from NYU’s Tisch School of the Arts as well as a J.D from The University of Southern California Law School. He also has a M.B.A. from the University of California, Los Angeles.

Sable started his comic book career in 2005, writing Grounded for Image Comics. In 2007, Sable followed up Grounded with Fearless, also from Image. Co-written by Dave Roth and Illustrated by P. J. Holden, Fearless tells the story of a vigilante who is addicted to an anti-fear drug, which he needs not only to fight crime, but to function as a human being.

Also in 2007, Sable wrote "online graphic novels" for the TV show Heroes that ran on NBC's website. His first, two-part webcomic called "Blackout" featured the character Mohinder Suresh was illustrated by Jason Badower. He also wrote the two-part story "Faces", featuring new characters created by Sable for the "Heroes" universe and illustrated by Alitha Martinez and Micah Gunnell.

In 2008, Sable wrote Image comics' Hazed, an original graphic novel, illustrated by Robbi Rodriguez. Also in 2008, Sable began work in animation by creating the original pilot Polarity for Cartoon Network.

In May 2009 Sable released his comic book series "Unthinkable" from Boom! Studios. Unthinkable was based on true incidents after 9/11, when the Department of Homeland Security recruited novelists, filmmakers and other creative types to help envision worst-case terror scenarios. In Sable's fictionalized version of events, a writer's imaginary terror plots start coming true, and it's up to the protagonist to stop them while he himself is a suspect. In an incident that mirrored the plot of the comic, Sable was briefly detained at Los Angeles International Airport by TSA guards, who found the script for issue 3 of the series to be suspicious. After Mandalay Pictures optioned "Unthinkable" as a feature film in 2009, in 2013, 20th Century Fox and producer Howard Gordon ("24", "Homeland") gave Sable an unheard-of "put pilot" deal to develop "Unthinkable" for network

In Summer 2010, Mark Sable's Cyborg: Rage Against The Machine, based on the popular Teen Titans character, saw print from DC Comics. Sable's series featured art by Ken Lashley and Carlo Magno.

Sable's other work for DC comics includes "Supergirl" (2007) with Ale Garza, where along with Joe Kelly he created a new origin for Kara Zor-El; "Teen Titans: Cold Case" with Sean Gordon Murphy (Punk Rock Jesus, Chononauts), featuring the first meet up between the Titans and The Flash's "Rogues Gallery" and "Batman - Two-Face: Year One", codifying Two-Face's origin for the 21st Century. Two-Face: Year one, illustrated by Jesus Saiz, Jeremy Haun, Jimmy Palmiotti with covers by Mark Chiarello, was released originally as a mini-series in conjunction with Two-Face/Harvey Dent's introduction to cinema in The Dark Knight.

Starting in 2011, Sable created books for DC's rival Marvel Comics as well, including "What If Spider-Man" (Killed Kraven the Hunter) and Marvel Universe Avengers: Hulk and the Fantastic Four.

In 2015, Sable started writing the comic book series "The Armagondas" for Domain Entertainment in Dubai, based on a story by famed Emirati artist Jalal Luqman and illustrated by Italian artist Denis Medri. Sable was recruited by to write "The Armagondas" after appearing at the original Middle East Film and Comic-Con", the first comic convention in the Middle East. Domain Entertainment is Dubai's first privately owned comics publisher, and Sable is one of the first Western Comic creators to specifically create work for the region.

Sable is also a writing professor. After teaching for 5 years at The Writer's Boot Camp in Santa Monica, California, in 2013 became one of the founding faculty members of the School of Visual Arts Masters in Visual Narrative Program, where he currently teaches "Creative Script" and "Digital Storytelling" (the latter with comics artist Jim Rugg).

== Bibliography ==
=== Image Comics ===
- Grounded (art by Paul Azaceta) (2005)
- Fearless (with co-author Dave Roth and art by P. J. Holden, 2007)
- 24/7 Vol. 2 "NYC2LA" (art by Dan Hipp) (2007)
- Popgun Vol. 1 "They Shoot Ponies, Don't They?" (art by Rob Guillory) (2007)
- Comic Book Tattoo: Stories Inspired by the Songs of Tori Amos ("Upside Down" from Tori Amos' Little Earthquakes"; art by Salgood Sam)
- Hazed (February 2008)
- Graveyard of Empires (with art by Paul Azaceta), (June 2011)

=== Boom! Studios ===
- Cthulhu Tales "There Will Be Blood" (art by Sergio Carrera)
- Unthinkable" (art by Julian Totino Tedesco) (2009)

=== DC Comics ===
- Supergirl (co-writer Joe Kelly, art by Ale Garza) 2007
- Dc Special: Cyborg (art by Ken Lashley and Carlo Magno) (May 2008)
- Two-Face: Year One(July 2008)
- Teen Titans: Cold Case (art by Sean Murphy) 2011

=== Marvel Comics ===
- What If Spider-Man Killed Kraven The Hunter (art by Paul Azaceta) (2011)
- What if? Dark Avengers (art by Paul Azaceta) (2011)
- Marvel Universe Avengers: Hulk and the Fantastic Four (2012)

=== Kickstart Comics ===
- Rift Raiders (art by Julian Totino Tedesco) (2009)
- Duplicate (art by Andy MacDonald)

=== Domain Entertainment ===
- The Armagondas (story by Jalal Luqman, art by Denis Medri) (2015)

=== Black Mask ===
- Occupy Comics Vol. 1 (art by Megan Hutchison)

=== The Atlantic Council's Art of Future Warfare/Art of The Future Project ===
- Allah Ex Machina - prose story (2016)
