= Flame Con =

LGBTQ+ multi-genre fan convention in the United States

- Status: Active
- Genre: LGBTQ-focused comic convention
- Venue: Sheraton New York Times Square Hotel
- Location: New York City
- Country: United States
- Inaugurated: June 13, 2015 (11 years ago)
- Most recent: August 12–13, 2023
- Next event: August 17–18, 2024
- Attendance: 8,000 (2019)
- Organizer: Geeks OUT
- Filing status: Non-profit
- Website: http://www.flamecon.org

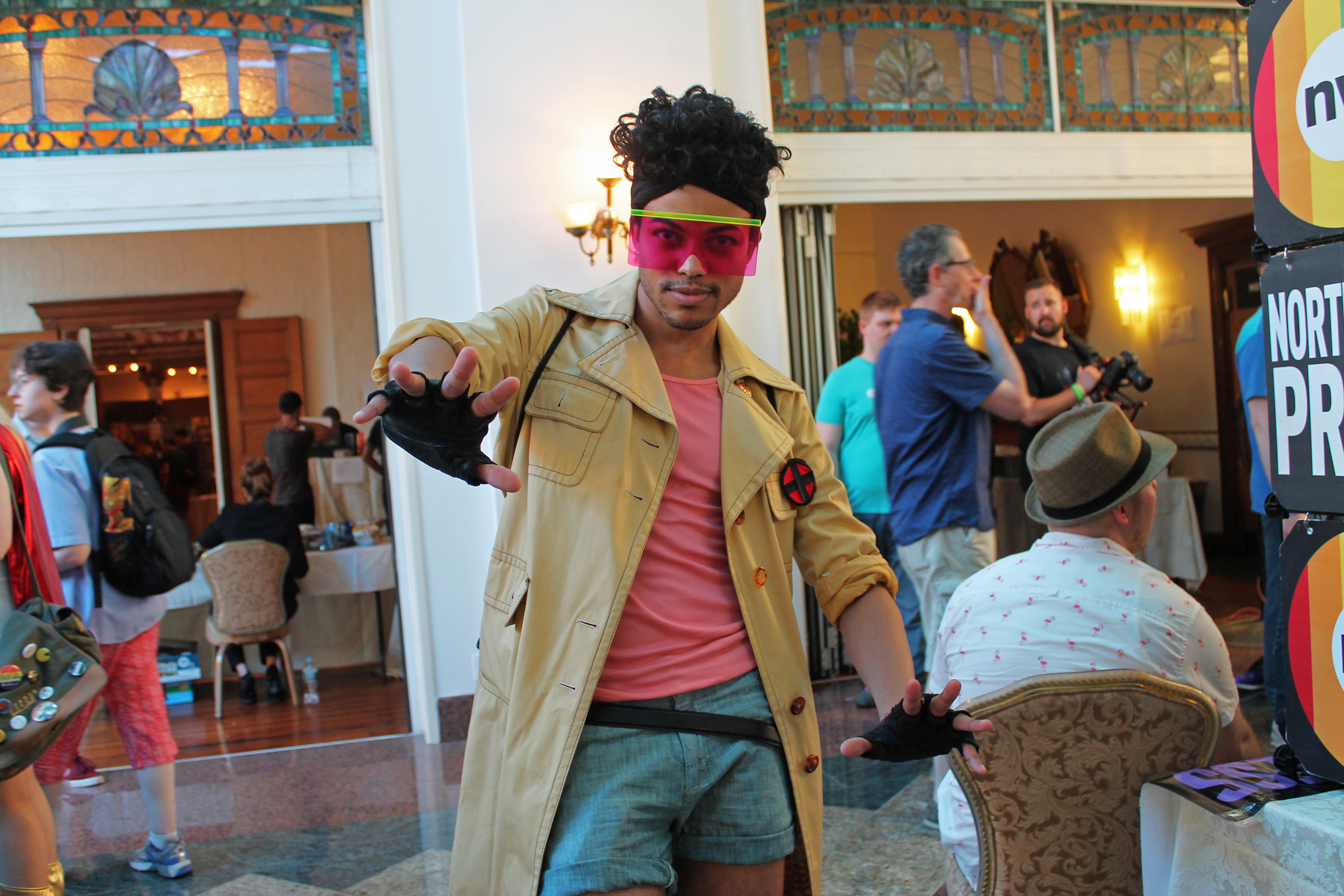
A cosplayer dressed as Jubilee at the inaugural Flame Con on June 13, 2015, at Grand Prospect Hall

Flame Con is an annual two-day multi-genre entertainment and comic convention, focused on fans and creators of pop culture who are lesbian, gay, bisexual, transgender, and queer (LGBTQ). Launched in 2015, it is the first LGBTQ comic convention in New York City, and the largest LGBTQ comic convention in the world.

== Programming ==
Flame Con is organized by Geeks OUT, a non-profit organization aimed at organizing LGBTQ events at comic conventions. The convention is a multi-genre event, showcasing LGBTQ-inclusive pop culture across comics, graphic novels, anime, manga, video games, movies, and television. Flame Con features panel discussions, workshops, and an exhibitors floor. The convention is launched with an annual kick-off party, which features a dance party and drag performances.

In partnership with the Ali Forney Center, the Sunday of each Flame Con is designated as "Youth Day", in which attendees under the age of 20 are granted free admission.

== History ==
Flame Con launched as a Kickstarter campaign in November 2014, with a fundraising goal of $15,000. The campaign would ultimately raise over $19,000, and was inaugurated as a one-day convention in June 2015. The following year, Flame Con moved from Grand Prospect Hall to the Brooklyn Bridge Marriott, and expanded to two days of programming.

After the 2016 Pulse nightclub shooting, Flame Con instituted a ban on all prop weapons at the convention, including those used in cosplay. In 2018, Flame Con relocated from Brooklyn to Manhattan to be held at the Sheraton New York Times Square Hotel. The convention switched to a lottery system to assign exhibitor space in 2019, and launched a mentorship program with artist Jen Bartel that same year. In 2020, Flame Con was cancelled due to the COVID-19 pandemic. An online-only version of the event was held in 2021, and the convention returned to a in-person event in 2022.

=== Event history ===
No.	Date(s)	Location	Atten.	Special guests
1	June 13, 2015	Grand Prospect Hall	2,200	Cecil Baldwin, Morgan Boecher, Sarah Donner, Lewd Alfred Douglas, C. Edwards, Aimee Fleck, Tommy Heleringer, Phil Jimenez, Daniel Ketchum, David Levithan, Krutika Mallikarjuna, Dylan Marron, Steve Orlando, Jill Pantozzi, Mark Patton, Tony Ray, Cristy Road, Chad Sell, Kate Tracy, James Tynion IV, Kevin Wada, Max Wittert, Jennie Wood
2	August 20–21, 2016	New York Marriott at the Brooklyn Bridge	4,000	Kris Anka, Cecil Baldwin, Tea Berry-Blue, Terry Blas, Brandon The Shapeshifter, Sophie Campbell, Jennifer Camper, Amy Chu, Chris Claremont, Sarah Donner, Lewd Alfred Douglas, Dax ExclamationPoint, Aimee Fleck, Tana Ford, Heather Hogan, Phil Jimenez, Jay Justice, Daniel Ketchum, Jeff Krell, Kate Leth, Laurent Linn, Alex London, Terra Elan McVoy, Steve Orlando, Greg Pak, Jill Pantozzi, Fyodor Pavlov, K. Perkins, Amy Reeder, Cristy Road, James Romberger, Marcy Schwerin, James Tynion IV, Marguerite Van Cook, Magdalene Visaggio, Chelsea Von Chastity, Kevin Wada, Matthew Waterhouse, Max Wittert, Jennie Wood
3	August 19–20, 2017	New York Marriott at the Brooklyn Bridge	6,000	Sana Amanat, Marc Andreyko, Kris Anka, Vita Ayala, Cecil Baldwin, Tea Berry-Blue, Soman Chainani, Amy Chu, Valerie Complex, Jay Edidin, Grace Ellis, Dax ExclamationPoint, Katy Farina, Ulises Fariñas, Aimee Fleck, Tana Ford, Tee Franklin, Nicole J. Georges, Sina Grace, Heather Hogan, Phil Jimenez, Robert Jones Jr., Jay Justice, Daniel Ketchum, Mackenzi Lee, Kate Leth, David Levithan, Laurent Linn, Alex London, Terra Elan McVoy, Steve Orlando, Dan Parent, Mark Patton, Amy Reeder, Vincent Rodriguez III, Kristin Russo, Marcy Schwerin, Adam Silvera, Nicky Soh, Bishakh Som, Rian Sygh, Robin Lord Taylor, James Tynion IV, Magdalene Visaggio, Kevin Wada, Max Wittert, Jennie Wood, Jenny Owen Youngs
4	August 18–19, 2018	Sheraton New York Times Square Hotel	7,000	K Alexander, Kris Anka, Iasmin Omar Ata, Vita Ayala, Jen Bartel, Terry Blas, Tee Franklin, Joamette Gil, Sina Grace, Atla Hrafney, Phil Jimenez, Julia Kaye, Irene Koh, MariNaomi, Annie Mok, Erin Nations, Steve Orlando, Lee Knox Ostertag, Dan Parent, Shadi Petosky, Amy Reeder, Hamish Steele, ND Stevenson, Lilah Sturges, Mariko Tamaki, Josh Trujillo, James Tynion IV, Magdalene Visaggio, Kevin Wada, Brittney Williams
5	August 17–18, 2019	Sheraton New York Times Square Hotel	8,000	Vita Ayala, Jen Bartel, Tamra Bonvillain, Terry Blas, Jay Edidin, Food 4 Thot, Crystal Frasier, Tana Ford, Melanie Gillman, D.J. Kirkland, Kate Leth, Ed Luce, Steve Orlando, Dana Simpson, Christina 'Steenz' Stewart, Miles Stokes, Taneka Stotts, Mariko Tamaki, Josh Trujillo, Rosemary Valero-O'Connell, Luciano Vecchio, Magdalene Visaggio, Wendy Xu
6	August 15–16, 2020 (scheduled)	Cancelled due to the COVID-19 pandemic	—N/a	Tanya DePass, Chuck Tingle (scheduled)
7	August 21–22, 2021	Virtual event	—N/a	none
8	August 20–21, 2022	Sheraton New York Times Square Hotel		Jadzia Axelrod, Terry Blas, Tanya DePass, Connor Goldsmith, Danny Lore, Barbara Perez Marquez, Jarrett Melendez, Anthony Oliveira, Steve Orlando, Aatmaja Pandya, Amy Reeder, Nadia Shammas, Hamish Steele
9	August 12–13, 2023	Sheraton New York Times Square Hotel		Alyssa Wong, Blue Delliquanti, Charlie Jane Anders, Chuck Tingle, Josh Trujillo, Maia Kobabe, Stephanie Williams, Terry Blas

== See also ==
- GaymerX, an LGBTQ-focused video game convention
- ClexaCon, an entertainment convention focused on LGBTQ women
