= Cerebro (podcast) =

Podcast about the X-Men

- Language: American English

Cast and voices
- Hosted by: Connor Goldsmith

Production
- Length: 2-4 hours

Publication
- No. of seasons: 4
- No. of episodes: 124
- Original release: September 1, 2020

Related
- Website: www.connorgoldsmith.com/cerebro

Cerebro is an audio podcast hosted by writer Connor Goldsmith. Each episode, Goldsmith talks with a guest about a single X-Men character and their entire history, going "through the byzantine maze of continuity that inevitably builds up over 60 years of storytelling," often with a queer lens. His guests have included authors, comedians, a Pulitzer winner, an Emmy nominee, as well as his own personal friends. Entertainment Weekly listed it in their article "The 10 Best Podcasts of 2021."

== History ==
Goldsmith, a former senior literary agent at Fuse Literary, started the podcast in 2020 as a way to keep from going stir crazy during the COVID-19 pandemic lockdowns. After encouragement from a friend, he decided to start with an interview with then-Excalibur writer Tini Howard about Betsy Braddock. The podcast is named after Cerebro, a device in the Marvel Comics universe that amplifies the user's telepathic abilities.

In April 2024, the podcast hit one hundred episodes and over 300 hours of content. Niko Stratis of Autostraddle stated, "It's got a long backlog of episodes, but it's a really fun, joyfully chaotic listen through a joyfully chaotic timeline of messy mutants."

== Format ==
Each episode highlights a different character in the X-Men comics, with Goldsmith and his guest often discussing themes of LGBTQ+ and how the character relates to the X-Men's minority metaphor. Entertainment Weekly described it as them "excavat[ing] the many queer allegories that are possible with these colorful characters." He will often talk about the character's history chronologically, before stopping for a brief segment called the "Cerebro Character File" - an abridged version of the character's history - and then resuming his discussion with the guest. The end of the episode has Goldsmith and his guests answer questions from listeners.

== Episodes ==
As of June 13, 2026, the podcast has aired 125 episodes, with a number of bonus episodes.

=== Season 1 ===
No.	Title	Length	Original release date
1	"Betsy Braddock (feat. Tini Howard)"	1:21:00	September 1, 2020
2	"Kurt Wagner (feat. Daniel Kibblesmith)"	1:34:00	September 8, 2020
3	"Emma Frost (feat. Alex Abad-Santos)"	2:18:00	September 15, 2020
4	"Piotr Rasputin (feat. Mattie Lubchansky)"	1:51:00	September 22, 2020
5	"Ororo Munroe (feat. Rashida Renée Ward)"	1:46:00	September 29, 2020
6	"Scott Summers (feat. Jay Edidin)"	1:47:00	October 6, 2020
7	"Dani Moonstar (feat. Darcie Little Badger)"	1:39:00	October 13, 2020
8	"Bobby Drake (feat. Anthony Oliveira)"	2:28:00	September 8, 2020
9	"Warren Worthington III (feat. Jay Jurden)"	2:28:00	October 27, 2020
10	"Raven Darkhölme (feat. Patrick Sullivan)"	2:27:00	November 3, 2020
11	"Hank McCoy (feat. Spencer Ackerman)"	2:23:00	November 10, 2020
12	"Brian Braddock (feat. Jordan D. White)"	2:40:00	November 17, 2020
13	"Logan (feat. Gerry Duggan)"	2:26:00	November 24, 2020
14	"Opal Luna Saturnyne (feat. Tini Howard)"	2:51:00	December 1, 2020
15	"Jean Grey (feat. Sara Century)"	2:46:00	December 8, 2020
16	"Erik Magnus Lehnsherr (feat. Spencer Ackerman)"	2:58:00	December 18, 2020
17	"Anna Marie (feat. Cass Morris)"	3:09:00	December 30, 2020
18	"Meggan Puceanu (feat. A.R. Moxon)"	2:55:00	January 5, 2021
19	"Tessa (feat. Valentine M. Smith)"	2:49:00	January 21, 2021
20	"Lorna Dane (feat. Cori McCreery)"	2:38:00	January 19, 2021
21	"Mortimer Toynbee (feat. Tim Platt)"	2:20:00	January 26, 2021
22	"Doug Ramsey (feat. Annalise Bissa)"	2:56:00	February 3, 2021
23	"Cassandra Nova (feat. Patrick Willems)"	2:31:00	February 9, 2021
24	"Alex Summers (feat. Allison Senecal)"	2:50:00	February 19, 2021
25	"Kitty Pryde (feat. Stephanie Burt)"	3:31:00	February 26, 2021
26	"Adam Neramani (feat. Fabian Nicieza)"	1:51:00	March 2, 2021
27	"Moira MacTaggert (feat. Zach Rabiroff)"	3:12:00	March 10, 2021
28	"Alison Blaire (feat. Evan Narcisse)"	3:25:00	March 19, 2021
29	"Rachel Summers (feat. Sara Century)"	3:23:00	March 25, 2021
30	"Stryfe (feat. Anthony Oliveira)"	3:07:00	March 30, 2021
31	"Armando Muñoz (feat. Angélique Roché)"	2:08:00	April 8, 2021
32	"Mojo (feat. Ann Nocenti)"	1:37:00	April 13, 2021
33	"Regan & Martinique Wyngarde (feat. Alex Abad-Santos)"	2:38:00	April 28, 2021
34	"Megan Gwynn (feat. Josh Cornillon)"	3:23:00	May 5, 2021
35	"Sally Blevins (feat. Jordan Blum)"	2:45:00	September 8, 2020
36	"Monet St. Croix (feat. Tini Howard & Kendra James)"	3:38:00	May 16, 2021
37	"Sarah Rushman (feat. Steve Orlando)"	1:20:00	May 21, 2020
38	"Joanna Cargill (feat. Mike Carey)"	2:20:00	May 27, 2021
39	"Xuân Cao Manh (feat. Sara Century)"	3:48:00	June 7, 2021
40	"Jean-Paul Beaubier (feat. Steve Foxe)"	3:34:00	June 17, 2021
41	"Julio Richter (feat. Louis Lopez)"	2:42:00	June 28, 2021
42	"Gaveedra Seven (feat. Luke Ruddick)"	2:33:00	July 10, 2021
43	"Roxy Washington (feat. Stephanie Williams)"	2:25:00	July 16, 2021
44	"Roberto da Costa (feat. Alex Segura)"	2:05:00	July 29, 2021
45	"Sam Guthrie (feat. Zoe Tunnell)"	3:06:00	August 5, 2021
46	"Everett Thomas (feat. Kendra James)"	2:33:00	August 11, 2021
47	"Jamie Madrox (feat. Elana Levin)"	3:30:00	August 22, 2021
48	"Paige Guthrie (feat. Karen Charm)"	3:20:00	August 27, 2021
49	"Remy LeBeau (feat. Chris Robinson)"	2:28:00	August 31, 2021
50	"Charles Xavier (feat. Spencer Ackerman)"	3:41:00	September 7, 2021

=== Season 2 ===
No.	Title	Length	Original release date
51	"Nathan Christopher Summers (feat. Vishal Gullapalli)"	3:17:00	September 29, 2021
52	"Candy Southern (feat. Sara Century)"	4:37:00	October 7, 2021
53	"Angelo Espinosa (feat. Terry Blas)"	2:21:00	October 18, 2021
54	"Theresa Rourke Cassidy (feat. Valentine Smith)"	4:33:00	October 24, 2021
55	"Selene Gallio (feat. Alex Abad-Santos)"	4:38:00	October 31, 2021
56	"Illyana Rasputina (feat. Leah Williams)"	3:51:00	November 5, 2021
57	"Sooraya Qadir (feat. Khaliden Nas)"	4:26:00	November 11, 2021
58	"Warlock (feat. Stephanie Burt)"	2:57:00	November 21, 2021
59	"Karl Lykos (feat. James Goldsmith)"	3:24:00	November 30, 2021
60	"Valerie Cooper (feat. Patrick Sullivan)"	3:50:00	December 8, 2021
61	"Bennet du Paris (feat. Anthony Oliveira)"	3:14:00	December 18, 2021
62	"David Alleyne (feat. Ash Alleyne)"	3:11:00	December 26, 2021
63	"Nate Grey (feat. Zack Jenkins)"	2:46:00	December 31, 2021
64	"Arkady Rossovich (feat. Ben Percy)"	2:06:00	January 4, 2022
65	"Laura Kinney (feat. Zoe Tunnell)"	3:05:00	January 16, 2022
66	"Callisto (feat. Spencer Ackerman)"	2:49:00	January 23, 2022
67	"Irene Adler (feat. Nola Pfau)"	2:39:00	January 31, 2022
68	"Shiro Yoshida (feat. Justin Park)"	2:36:00	February 7, 2022
69	"Miranda Leevald (feat. Josh Cornillon)"	3:09:00	February 16, 2022
70	"Victor Creed (feat. Victor LaValle)"	2:04:00	February 28, 2022
71	"Jono Starsmore (feat. Kat Overland)"	2:45:00	March 15, 2022
72	"Sophie, Phoebe, Irma, Celeste, & Esme (feat. Charles Pulliam-Moore)"	4:13:00	March 18, 2022
73	"Kwannon (feat. Caroline Bird)"	3:16:00	April 3, 2022
74	"Sean Cassidy (feat. Thom Dunn)"	3:16:00	April 10, 2022
75	"Eleanor Murch & Peter (feat. Zeb Wells)"	2:21:00	April 18, 2022

=== Season 3 ===
No.	Title	Length	Original release date
76	"Nathaniel Essex (feat. Kieron Gillen)"	3:02:00	May 22, 2022
77	"John Proudstar (feat. Nyla Rose & Steve Orlando)"	1:36:00	May 30, 2022
78	"Cecilia Reyes (feat. Stephanie Williams)"	2:39:00	June 14, 2022
79	"Abigail Brand (feat. Al Ewing)"	4:06:00	June 2, 2022
80	"Rita Wayword (feat. Jordan Blok)"	3:06:00	June 29, 2022
81	"Rahne Sinclair (feat. Rebecca Gault)"	3:55:00	July 14, 2022
82	"Amara Aquilla (feat. Alex Abad-Santos)"	3:57:00	July 28, 2022
83	"St. John Allerdyce (feat. Anthony Oliveira)"	4:06:00	August 8, 2022
84	"Maria Callasantos (feat. Darryl Ayo)"	2:52:00	September 8, 2022
85	"Lila Cheney (feat. Margot Mutter)"	2:41:00	September 15, 2022
86	"Colin McKay (feat. Sam Guido)"	1:54:00	September 24, 2022
87	"Pietro Maximoff (feat. Luke Ruddick)"	3:56:00	October 2, 2022
88	"Andrea & Andreas von Strucker (feat. Spencer Ackerman)"	3:51:00	October 22, 2022
89	"Tabitha Smith (feat. Leah Williams)"	3:54:00	October 27, 2022
90	"Melody Jacobs (feat. Jordan Blok)"	5:09:00	November 4, 2022
91	"Eden Fesi & Gateway (feat. Kaetun Khlynne)"	4:29:00	November 19, 2022
92	"Tom Cassidy (feat. Eoin Higgins)"	3:34:00	December 6, 2022
93	"Amahl Farouk (feat. Khaldoun Khelil)"	3:24:00	December 16, 2022
94	"Longshot (feat. Nola Pfau)"	3:53:00	December 31, 2022
95	"Jubilation Lee (feat. Jason Loo)"	4:24:00	January 14, 2023
96	"Forge (feat. Josh Trujillo)"	4:58:00	January 29, 2023
97	"Sebastian Shaw (feat. Steven Attewell)"	4:25:00	February 11, 2023
98	"Jamie Braddock (feat. Holly Raymond)"	5:12:00	February 21, 2023
99	"Annie Ghazikhanian (feat. Chuck Austen)"	2:35:00	March 17, 2023
100	"Madelyne Pryor (feat. Sara Century)"	18:03:00	April 15, 2023
Due to the extra-length nature of this episode, it was broken up into five parts, each named after a section of the crossover "Inferno": "Prologue: Vanities!" 4:15:00; "Part the First: Strike the Match!" 3:27:00; "Part the Second: Fan the Flames!" 3:57:00; "Part the Third: Burn!" 3:21:00; "Part the Fourth: Ashes!" 3:03:00

=== Season 4 ===
No.	Title	Length	Original release date
101	"En Sabah Nur (feat. Jonathan Hickman)"	3:35:00	May 30, 2023
102	"Nekra Sinclair (feat. Jordan Blok)"	6:41:00	June 24, 2023
103	"Calvin Rankin (feat. Chad Anderson)"	3:49:00	July 16, 2023
104	"Amanda Sefton (feat. Anna Peppard)"	6:51:00	October 10, 2023
105	"Cain Marko (feat. Anthony Oliveira)"	6:56:00	November 25, 2023
106	"Laurie Collins (feat. Alex Abad-Santos)"	3:56:00	December 15, 2023
107	"Candra (feat. Kat Driscoll)"	5:56:00	February 2, 2024
108	"Hepzibah (feat. Jordan Blok)"	9:30:41	February 27, 2024
Due to the extra-length nature of the episode, it was divided into two: "Part One: Stepmutha Has Arrived" 4:51:00; "Part Two: Skunk, Interrupted" 4:41:00
109	"Arcade (feat. Annalise Bissa)"	3:42:48	April 13, 2024
110	"Trish Tilby (feat. Patrick Sullivan)"	3:50:52	May 10, 2024
111	"Eva Bell (feat. Karen Charm)"	3:04:33	May 28, 2024
112	"Gloria Dolores Muñoz (feat. Alex Segura)"	4:09:15	June 18, 2024
113	"Hope Summers (feat. Kieron Gillen)"	4:10:22	July 15, 2024
114	"Namor McKenzie (feat. Spencer Ackerman)"	4:57:55	September 17, 2024
115	"Jeanne-Marie Beaubier (feat. Sara Century)"	6:06:43	September 30, 2024
116	"Victor Borkowski (feat. Jay Jurden)"	3:12:20	November 7, 2024
117	"Yuriko Oyama (feat. Jordan Blok)"	8:52:59	December 24, 2024
117	"Yuriko Oyama (feat. Jordan Blok)"	8:52:59	December 26, 2024
Due to the extra-length nature of the episode, it was divided into two: "Part One: A Lady Deathstrike Christmas" 4:04:25; "Part Two: Heavy Metal & Reflective" 4:49:37
118	"Lilandra Neramani (feat. Josh Trujillo)"	5:38:03	January 31, 2025
119	"Idie Okonkwo (feat. Murewa Ayodele)"	2:48:15	February 26, 2025
120	"Pete Wisdom (feat. Dan Grote)"	4:23:35	May 1, 2025
121	"Mariko Yashida (feat. Justin Park)"	8:43:09	June 8, 2025
121	"Mariko Yashida (feat. Justin Park)"	8:43:09	June 27, 2025
Due to the extra-length nature of the episode, it was divided into two: "Part One: Wolverine no Baka" 4:09:53; "Part Two: Honor, Duty, and Whatnot" 4:35:48
122	"Gatecrasher & Technet (feat. Jadzia Axelrod)"	4:40:26	July 30, 2025
123	"Quentin Quire (feat. Scott Platton)"	8:30:53	September 21, 2025
123	"Quentin Quire (feat. Scott Platton)"	8:30:53	October 20, 2025
Due to the extra-length nature of the episode, it was divided into two: "Part One: The Rats & The Children" 4:14:09; "Part Two: You Were Never My Age" 4:20:59
124	"Amelia Voght (feat. Patrick Sullivan)"	7:45:10	December 31, 2025
124	"Amelia Voght (feat. Patrick Sullivan)"	7:45:10	January 11, 2026
Due to the extra-length nature of the episode, it was divided into two: "Part One: Hello, Nurse!" 3:43:49; "Part Two: Play Misty for Me" 4:07:51
125	"Angelica Jones (feat. Josh Cornillon & Holly Ramond)"	9:11:25	April 15, 2026
125	"Angelica Jones (feat. Josh Cornillon & Holly Ramond)"	9:11:25	May 22, 2026
Due to the extra-length nature of the episode, it was divided into two: "Part One: A Firestar is Born" 5:01:15; "Part Two: Marvel Diva Down" 4:14:32

=== Season 5 ===
No.	Title	Length	Original release date
126	"Marius St. Croix (feat. Anthony Oliveira & Khaliden Nas)"	5:28:22	July 5, 2026
Due to the extra-length nature of the episode, it was divided into two: "Part One: Les Fleurs du Mal" 5:28:22

== See also ==
- List of LGBTQ podcasts
