= Love Is Love (comics) =

American graphic novel

- Date: December 2016
- No. of issues: 1
- Publisher: IDW Publishing, DC Comics

Creative team
- Writers: See section
- Artists: See section
- Pencillers: See section
- Inkers: See section
- Letterers: See section
- Colourists: See section
- Creators: See section
- Editors: See section
- ISBN: 978-1-63140-939-4

Love Is Love is a 144-page graphic novel released in December 2016 by IDW Publishing in collaboration with DC Entertainment with many characters appearing from other publishers and franchises with explicit permission in tribute to the victims of the Orlando nightclub shooting. The comic became a New York Times bestseller and over US$165,000 was raised by the sales, which was donated to the victims. The comic was produced with volunteer work by dozens of artists and featured the first official comic based on the Harry Potter media franchise.

== Background ==
On the 12th of June, 2016, Omar Mateen shot and killed 49 people and wounded 53 others at the Pulse nightclub in Orlando, Florida. The nightclub was a gay bar and the perpetrator had decided to commit a mass shooting in response to the United States' airstrike a month prior that killed Abu Waheeb, a leader of the Islamic State in Anbar, Iraq. No evidence points to Mateen knowing the Pulse was a gay bar.

== Publication history ==
=== Format ===
Unlike most graphic novels, the book is a mass anthology with one or two-page-long shorts, comic strips or single illustrated pages lacking panels or dialogue bubbles. IDW Publishing simply referred to it as an "oversize comic", as did Goodreads, Geek.com, and Comic Book Resources.

=== List of contributors ===
The following is a list of contributors listed in the Love is Love comic.

==== Writers ====
- Fernando Blanco
- Ellie Ann Lang
- Jim Zub
- Patrick Zircher
- Justin Zimmerman
- Joshua Yehl
- Jennie Wood
- G. Willow Wilson
- Rob Williams
- Christina Weir
- Kurtis Weibe
- Matt Wagner
- Pedro Víllora
- Robert Venditti
- James Tynion IV
- B. Alex Thompson
- Teddy Tenenbaum
- Tom Taylor
- Lilah Sturges
- Morgan Spurlock
- Scott Snyder
- Gail Simone
- Liam Sharp
- Chris Ryall
- Christina Rossetti
- Matthew Rosenberg
- Ashely Victoria Robinson
- James Robinson
- Rachel Rickey
- Ivan Reis
- J.R. Rand
- Ben Raab
- Dan Parent
- Jeff Parker
- Patton Oswalt
- Steve Orlando
- Nyambi Nyambi
- Scott Morse
- Grant Morrison
- Devon T.W. Morales
- Chris Miskiewicz
- Mark Millar
- Brad Meltzer
- T. Chick McClure
- Mary Jo Smith
- Gulliem March
- David Macho
- Ed Luce
- Scott Lope
- Damon Lindelof
- Tom King
- Jeff King
- Chuck Kim
- Taran Killam
- Joe Kelly
- Dave Justus
- Dan Jurgens
- Jeff Jensen
- Van Jensen
- Paul Jenkins
- Jason Inman
- Emma Houxbois
- Joe Harris
- Justin Hall
- Marc Guggenheim
- Sina Grace
- Christian Gossett
- Eddie Gorodetsky
- Christopher Golden
- Kieron Gillen
- Sterling Gates
- Chris and Ruth Gage
- Tee Franklin
- Steve Foxe
- Greg Fox
- Ross Fisher
- Joshua Hale Fialkov
- Al Ewing
- Jay Edidin
- Joshua Dysart
- Gerry Duggan
- Drew Droege
- David Drake
- Jeff Dixon
- Paul Dini
- Dan DiDio
- Amanda Deibert
- Nunzio DeFilippis
- Brenna Davis
- Dave Crossland
- Cecil Castellucci
- Mike Carlin
- Mike Carey
- Jeffrey Burandt
- Brian Buccellato
- Ivan Brandon
- Paige Braddock
- John Ross Bowie
- Matt Bomer
- Marc Bernardin
- Marguerite Bennett
- Brian Michael Bendis
- Tony Bedard
- Dan Beals
- Mark Badger
- Paul Azaceta
- David Avallone
- James Asmus
- Alejandro Arbona
- Roberto Aguirre-Sacasa
- Jason Aaron
- Marc Andreyko

==== Pencillers ====
- Fernando Blanco
- Patrick Zircher
- Leinil Yu
- Pete Woods
- Judd Winick
- Brad Walker
- Sean Von Gorman
- José Villarrubia
- Emma Vieceli
- Max Vento
- Billy Tucci
- Wilfredo Torres
- Marcial Toledano
- Philip Tan
- Cat Staggs
- Jon Sommariva
- Mary Jo Smith
- Emily Smith
- Karl Slominski
- Liam Sharp
- David Sexton
- Tim Seeley
- Dan Schkade
- Victor Santos
- Jesus Saiz
- Steve Sadowski
- P. Craig Russell
- Stéphane Roux
- Robbi Rodriguez
- Pedro Rodriguez
- Nick Robles
- Elayne and Robin Riggs
- Kevin Richardson
- Ivan Reis
- Paul Reinwald
- Steve Pugh
- Brandon Peterson
- George Pérez
- Brent Peeples
- Dan Parent
- Jeff Parker
- Lee Knox Ostertag
- Alvar Ortiz
- Mike Oeming
- Phil Noto
- Troy Nixey
- Vivian Ng
- Amancay Nahuelpan
- Scott Morse
- Bill Morrison
- Rags Morales
- Travis Moore
- Karl Moline
- Guillermo Mogorron
- Jesus Merino
- Carla Speed McNeil
- Mike McKone
- Jeff McComsey
- T. Chick McClure
- Iain McCaig
- Shawn Martinbrough
- Gulliem March
- Francis Manapul
- David Mack
- Ed Luce
- John Lucas
- David López
- Joseph Michael Linsner
- Jim Lee
- Iain Laurie
- Jason Latour
- David Lafuente
- Jeff Krell
- Piotr Kowalski
- Tristan Jones
- Mark Simpson 'Jock'
- Phil Jimenez
- Austin James
- Jesus Iglesias
- Mike Huddleston
- Jonathan Hickman
- Cully Hamner
- Craig Hamilton
- Justin Hall
- Robert Hack
- Andrew Griffith
- Sina Grace
- Sarah Gordon
- Isaac Goodhart
- Mitch Gerads
- Alé Garza
- Lee Garbett
- Simon Fraser
- Greg Fox
- Sophia Foster-Dimino
- Sagar Fornies
- Tom Feister
- Gary Erskine
- Chris Eliopoulos
- Kieron Dwyer
- Ming Doyle
- Mike Dowling
- Carlos D’Anda
- Dave Crossland
- Barry Crain
- Matt Clark
- Yıldıray Çınar
- Vincente Cifuentes
- Jim Calafiore
- Stephen Byrne
- Mark Buckingham
- Andrei Bressan
- Paige Braddock
- Peter Bergting
- Gabriel Bautista
- Donna Barr
- Mark Badger
- Paul Azaceta
- Alejandro Gutierrez Franco
- Aneke
- Kaare Andrews
- Mirka Andolfo
- Jason Shawn Alexander
- Rafael Albuquerque
- Dave Acosta

==== Inkers ====
- Fernando Blanco
- Patrick Zircher
- Leinil Yu
- Pete Woods
- Judd Winick
- Brad Walker
- Sean Von Gorman
- José Villarrubia
- Emma Vieceli
- Max Vento
- Billy Tucci
- Wilfredo Torres
- Marcial Toledano
- Philip Tan
- Cat Staggs
- Jon Sommariva
- Emily Smith
- Karl Slominski
- Liam Sharp
- Tim Seeley
- Dan Schkade
- Victor Santos
- Jesus Saiz
- Steve Sadowski
- P. Craig Russell
- Stéphane Roux
- Robbi Rodriguez
- Pedro Rodriguez
- Nick Robles
- Kevin Richardson
- Ivan Reis
- Paul Reinwald
- Steve Pugh
- Brandon Peterson
- Brent Peeples
- Dan Parent
- Jeff Parker
- Lee Knox Ostertag
- Alvar Ortiz
- Mike Oeming
- Phil Noto
- Troy Nixey
- Vivian Ng
- Amancay Nahuelpan
- Scott Morse
- Bill Morrison
- Rags Morales
- Travis Moore
- Karl Moline
- Guillermo Mogorron
- Carla Speed McNeil
- Mike McKone
- Jeff McComsey
- T. Chick McClure
- Mary Jo Smith
- Shawn Martinbrough
- Jesus Marino
- Gulliem March
- Francis Manapul
- David Mack
- Ed Luce
- John Lucas
- David López
- Joseph Michael Linsner
- Iain Laurie
- Jason Latour
- David Lafuente
- Jeff Krell
- Piotr Kowalski
- Karl Kesel
- Tristan Jones
- Mark Simpson 'Jock'
- Phil Jimenez
- Austin James
- Jesus Iglesias
- Mike Huddleston
- Jonathan Hickman
- Cully Hamner
- Craig Hamilton
- Justin Hall
- Robert Hack
- Andrew Griffith
- Sarah Gordon
- Isaac Goodhart
- Mitch Gerads
- Alé Garza
- Lee Garbett
- Simon Fraser
- Greg Fox
- Sophia Foster-Dimino
- Sagar Fornies
- Tom Feister
- Gary Erskine
- Chris Eliopoulos
- Kieron Dwyer
- Ming Doyle
- Mike Dowling
- Carlos D’Anda
- Dave Crossland
- Barry Crain
- Matt Clark
- Yıldıray Çınar
- Vincente Cifuentes
- Jim Calafiore
- Stephen Byrne
- Mark Buckingham
- Andrei Bressan
- Paige Braddock
- Peter Bergting
- Gabriel Bautista
- Donna Barr
- Mark Badger
- Paul Azaceta
- Alejandro Gutierrez Franco
- Aneke
- Kaare Andrews
- Mirka Andolfo
- Jason Shawn Alexander
- Rafael Albuquerque
- Dave Acosta

==== Colourists ====
- Fernando Blanco
- Yel Zamor
- Leinil Yu
- Pete Woods
- Judd Winick
- Michael Wiggam
- Brennan Wagner
- José Villarrubia
- Max Vento
- Priscilla Tramontano
- Marcial Toledano
- Christina Strain
- Robert Stanley
- Cat Staggs
- Chris Sotomayor
- Taki Soma
- Karl Slominski
- Brad Simpson
- Dan Shadian
- Harry Saxon
- Victor Santos
- Elmer Santos
- K. Michael Russell
- Stéphane Roux
- Robbi Rodriguez
- Pedro Rodriguez
- Nick Robles
- Elayne and Robin Riggs
- Ivan Reis
- Paul Reinwald
- Brandon Peterson
- Dan Parent
- Jeff Parker
- Lee Knox Ostertag
- Alvar Ortiz
- Phil Noto
- Vivian Ng
- Paul Mounts
- Scott Morse
- Karl Moline
- Guillermo Mogorron
- Carla Speed McNeil
- Mike McKone
- Jeff McComsey
- T. Chick McClure
- Mary Jo Smith
- Iain McCaig
- Jesus Merino
- Gulliem March
- Francis Manapul
- David Mack
- Ed Luce
- Adriano Lucas
- David López
- Joseph Michael Linsner
- Jason Latour
- David Lafuente
- Jeff Krell
- Lovern Kindzierski
- Mark Simpson 'Jock'
- Austin James
- Leonardo Ito
- Jesus Iglesias
- Mike Huddleston
- Jonathan Hickman
- Justin Hall
- Sina Grace
- Sarah Gordon
- Mitch Gerads
- Michael Garland
- Simon Fraser
- Greg Fox
- Sophia Foster-Dimino
- Sagar Fornies
- Tom Feister
- Antonio Fabela
- Mark Englert
- Chris Eliopoulos
- Kieron Dwyer
- Ming Doyle
- Mike Dowling
- Carlos D’Anda
- Andrew Dalhouse
- Dave Crossland
- Yıldıray Çınar
- Vincente Cifuentes
- Gabriel Cassata
- Stephen Byrne
- Mark Buckingham
- Giuilia Brusco
- Andrei Bressan
- Bo Bradshaw
- Paige Braddock
- Jordan Boyd
- Tyler Boss
- Tamra Bonvillian
- Fernando Blanco
- Peter Bergting
- Gabriel Bautista
- Donna Barr
- Mark Badger
- Paul Azaceta
- Mike Atiyeh
- Alejandro Gutierrez Franco
- Aneke
- Mirka Andolfo
- Laura Allred
- Jason Shawn Alexander
- Rafael Albuquerque
- Dave Acosta
- Hi-Fi (program created by colorist Brian Miller)

==== Letterers ====
- Jim Zub
- Patrick Zircher
- John Workman
- Russ Wooton
- Steve Wands
- Sean Von Gorman
- Max Vento
- Marcial Toledano
- Saida Temofonte
- Karl Slominski
- Dmyko Sienty
- Willie Schubert
- Victor Santos
- Jesus Saiz
- JG Roshell
- Pedro Rodriguez
- Ivan Reis
- Paul Reinwald
- Brandon Peterson
- Dan Parent
- Jeff Parker
- Lee Knox Ostertag
- Alvar Ortiz
- Phil Noto
- Chris Mowry
- Scott Morse
- Travis Moore
- Guillermo Mogorron
- Carla Speed McNeil
- Jeff McComsey
- T. Chick McClure
- Mary Jo Smith
- Gulliem March
- Carlos Manguel
- Ed Luce
- Jason Latour
- Dave Lanphear
- Travis Lanham
- David Lafuente
- Todd Klein
- Austin James
- Jesus Iglesias
- Mike Heisler
- Craig Hamilton
- Justin Hall
- Sina Grace
- Simon Fraser
- Greg Fox
- Sophia Foster-Dimino
- Sagar Fornies
- Jared K. Fletcher
- Ryan Ferrier
- Taylor Esposito
- Kieron Dwyer
- Dave Crossland
- Joshua Cozine
- Elisa M. Coletti
- Sal Cipriano
- Janice Chiang
- Stephen Byrne
- Ed Brisson
- Corey Breen
- Paige Braddock
- Peter Bergting
- Deron Bennett
- Gabriel Bautista
- Donna Barr
- Neal Bailey
- Mark Badger
- Alejandro Gutierrez Franco
- Jason Shawn Alexander
- Dave Acosta

==== Editors ====
- Marc Andreyko
- Sarah Gaydos
- Robert 'Bob' Harras
- David Hedgecock
- Maggie Howell
- Jamie S. Rich
- Chris Ryall

==== Cover artists ====
- Jordie Bellaire
- Elsa Charretier
- Steven Cook

==== Other creators ====
- Patty Jenkins (introduction)
- J.K. Rowling (loaned out characters and text from her novels)
- Marc Andreyko (afterword)
- Steven Cook (logo design)
- Lou Prand (layouts)
- David Drake (adaption)
- Dennis Calero
- Olivier Coipel
- Amanda Conner
- Andrew Constant
- Denys Cowan
- Crank!
- Arvind Ethan David
- Vito Delsante
- Shannon Eric Denton
- Kelly Fitzpatrick
- Javier Grillo-Marxuach
- Michael Hoeweler
- Douglas Holgate
- Rantz Hoseley
- Kike Infame
- Shawn Lee
- Vince Locke
- Julian Lopez
- Kevin Mellon
- Richard Ortiz
- Greg Pak
- Livio Ramondelli
- Kelsey Shannon
- Scott Shaw
- Frank Tieri
- Jill Thompson
- Josh Trujillo
- Zeb Wells

== Stories ==
Many of the stories featured in Love is Love revolve around LGBT-related relationships and discrimination, and they sometimes utilize pop culture icons such as Poison Ivy, Harley Quinn, Deathstroke, and Wonder Woman. One tale is about a forgotten Golden Age superhero, Rainbow Boy, who uses his powers to fight "Doc Drumpf" and his armies of "Spider Haters".

== Reception ==
Love is Love won the 2017 Eisner Award for Best Anthology. The book holds an average rating of 9.6 by five professional critics on the review aggregation website Comic Book Roundup.

The book was banned in a Texas school due to "extreme homosexuality".
