= Moxon =

Moxon may refer to:

== People ==
=== Sport ===
- Bill Moxon (1885–1952), Australian rules footballer
- Martyn Moxon (born 1960), English cricketer
- Owen Moxon (born 1998), English footballer
- Steve Moxon (born 1987), Australian kickboxer

=== Other people ===
- George Moxon (1602–1687), English clergyman
- Joseph Moxon (1627–1691), English hydrographer to Charles II
- David Moxon (born 1951), Church of England Bishop of Waikato
- Edward Moxon (1801–1858), British poet and publisher
- Elizabeth Moxon (fl.1740–1754), English cookery writer
- Kendrick Moxon, American lawyer with Moxon & Kobrin and Scientologist
- May Moxon, the stage name of Scottish dancer and choreographer Euphemia Davison (1906–1996)
- Michael Moxon, honorary chaplain to Elizabeth II
- Timothy Moxon (1924–2006), English actor and pilot
- W. Moxon Cook (1857–1917), Australian sports journalist
- A. R. Moxon, American author

=== Fictional ===
- Lew Moxon, character in the DC Comics Batman series

== Other uses ==
- Moxon & Kobrin, the Church of Scientology's law firm
- Moxon antenna, a rectangular two-element array antenna often homebuilt by amateur radio enthusiasts
- Moxon Huddersfield, a British textile manufacturer of luxury worsted and woollen cloth
