= Darst =

Darst is a surname. Notable people with the surname include:

- David Darst, CFA, an American financier, educator and author
- Jeanne Darst, American author
- Joseph Darst (1889–1953), the thirty-seventh Mayor of St. Louis
- Margaret Darst Corbett (1889–1962), American vision educator who used the discredited Bates method
- Seth Darst, American biochemist, member of the United States National Academy of Sciences
