= Geeks OUT =

New York City-based non-profit organization

- Website type: Not-for-profit; Entertainment; Queer geekdom
- Available in: English
- President: Nic Gitau
- Website: geeksout.org
- Commercial: No
- Registration: Not required to access
- Launched: October 2010; 15 years ago
- Current status: Active
- Written in: English

Geeks OUT is a New York City-based, non-profit organization, founded in 2010, whose mission is to rally, empower, and promote the queer geek community. The content on its website often focuses on gaming, video gaming culture, comics, superheroes, science fiction, television, film, and other "geek" media, through a queer lens. Geeks OUT has left a "solid impact on geek culture." Geeks OUT is host to the world's largest LGBTQ queer comic con, Flame Con.

The organization also came to international attention when it started a Skip Ender's Game movement in 2013. The movement, often promoted with the #SkipEndersGame hashtag, called for a boycott of the film Ender's Game, based on the novel Ender's Game by Orson Scott Card.

== Purpose ==
Geeks OUT is a 501(c)(3) non-profit organization dedicated to rallying, empowering and promoting the queer geek community. Founded in 2010 with the goal of bringing a positive queer presence to local comic conventions, Geeks OUT now hosts events in five major cities, attends conventions across the nation and produces the world's largest LGBTQ comic convention - Flame Con. Geeks OUT is also the publisher behind Power! An Anthology of Queer Creators and the forthcoming Serving Pride: The Queer History Dinner Party Handbook.

== Board Members ==
Geeks OUT was originally founded by Josh Siegel and Joey Stern. In 2018, Geeks OUT announced their new Board Members, including the organization's first non-binary president, Nic Gitau.

2023 Board Members:

- Nic Gitau - President
- Kevin Gilligan - Vice President
- Steve Gianaca - Secretary
- Mark Emsak - Treasurer
- Phoebe Ellman - Board Member
- Leslee Friedman - Board Member
- Rachel Greeman - Board Member
- Mike Moon - Board Member
- Sara Munson - Board Member

== Events ==
Geeks OUT holds events across the country in large cities including: New York City, Seattle, Los Angeles, Washington, D.C., and more. Geeks OUT is often present at comic conventions, sometimes called "comic cons", either tabling, hosting discussion panels, or having a booth. In 2013, they partnered with the New York Times for a discussion panel called New York Times OUT and Geeks Out present LGBT and Allies in Comics, which was held at the New York Comic Con. The panel included Dan Parent, Marjorie Liu, Greg Pak, Jude Biersdorf, Dan Ketchum, and Rich Bernatovech, among others.

Another event included 'McKellen Me Softly', a celebration of Ian McKellen with all original artwork featuring the actor for sale. The proceeds from the event went to fund the nonprofit. Jono Jarrett, a founding member of Geeks OUT, stated, "Geeks OUT could not be more proud to honor the unparalleled creative achievements and beloved personality of Sir Ian McKellen as this year's queer geek icon. We're inspired by his courage, his talent, and his fabulous joie de vivre -- whether he's leading a band of Hobbits across Middle Earth, or Sir Patrick Stewart across the Brooklyn Bridge. By tragedy or trial we grow stronger, but our community must never neglect to celebrate our success stories. Sir Ian McKellen is the happy hero we need."

== Flame Con ==
Launched in 2015, Flame Con is the world's largest queer comic con. Showcasing creators and special guests from all corners of LGBTQ fandom, it features thoughtful discussions, exclusive performances, screenings, and cosplay. In November 2014, the group started a fundraising campaign to start New York City's first queer comic convention. The convention fundraiser met its $15,000 goal on December 4, 2014. The project eventually received close to $20,000 in fundraising support on Kickstarter. The fundraising was endorsed by OUT Magazine, BUST Magazine, NewNowNext, and others. Flame Con 2023 is set to take place August 12 and 13 at the Times Square Sheraton in New York City.

== Skip Enders Game ==
The Skip Enders Game movement raised Geeks OUT's profile and brought attention to Orson Scott Card's views on homosexuality. Geeks OUT posited that since Card was a board member of the National Organization for Marriage and holds anti-gay views, people should not financially support his projects. Their message: "Skip Ender's Game" is a call to action. Do NOT see this movie! Do not buy a ticket at the theater, do not purchase the DVD, do not watch it on-demand. Ignore all merchandise and toys. However much you may have admired his books, keep your money out of Orson Scott Card's pockets."

Geeks OUT members were interviewed by Michelangelo Signorile on his radio XM show to talk about the boycott. The movement received coverage from Towleroad, Mother Jones, The Huffington Post, and other mainstream media with discussions about artistic works and if the artist's personal beliefs affect them.

The campaign got significant media coverage before Ender's Game was released on October 24, 2013. It was mentioned in The Hollywood Reporter, Wired, Los Angeles Times and The Washington Post.

In response, Card issued a statement saying, "Ender's Game is set more than a century in the future and has nothing to do with political issues that did not exist when the book was written in 1984. With the recent Supreme Court ruling, the gay marriage issue becomes moot. The Full Faith and Credit clause of the Constitution will, sooner or later, give legal force in every state to any marriage contract recognized by any other state." The movement also received criticism, including criticism from Diane Anderson-Minshall, editor-at-large of The Advocate. She stated, "In a world where ethical consumerism is sometimes the best way to get our point across, art is a murky zone... Our mouths say boycott, but our TV remotes don't always back that up."

After the film was released media coverage continued in: The Guardian, Slate (magazine) and The Hollywood Reporter. On October 30, 2013 Josh Dickey from TheWrap reported that Card "made his movie deal years ago — and there's no backend in it" saying "Progressive people of the world, go ahead and see 'Ender's Game' this weekend with a clear conscience: Orson Scott Card won't see a penny of your movie ticket money" while "Card still profits handsomely from the novel, perched at the top of the latest New York Times Best Seller List for paperback mass-market fiction".

According to HuffPost Card said he received “no actual criticism because they've never addressed any of my actual ideas”.
