= Bentley State Limousine =

Official state cars for the British Monarch

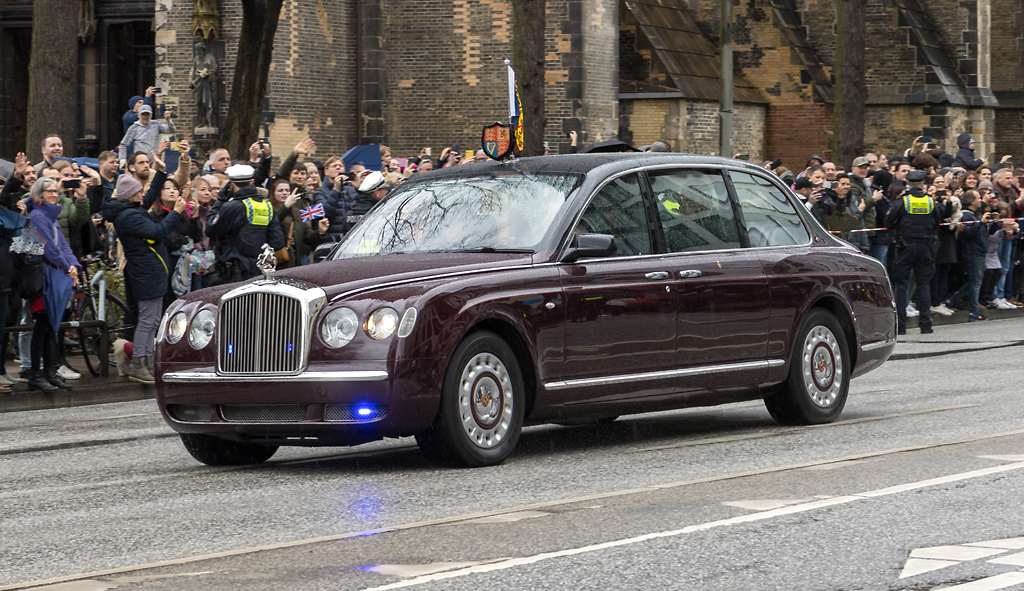
- The car featuring the monarch's personal English mascot made by Edward Seago of St George slaying the dragon. The mascot is changed to match the car's duties.

Overview
- Manufacturer: Bentley
- Production: 2002; 2 produced
- Assembly: United Kingdom: Crewe (Bentley Crewe)
- Designer: Crispin Marshfield under Dirk van Braeckel

Body and chassis
- Class: Full-size luxury car Limousine; Official state car
- Body style: 4-door landaulet saloon
- Layout: FR layout
- Doors: Conventional doors (front); Coach doors (rear)

Powertrain
- Engine: 6.75-litre twin turbocharged Rolls-Royce–Bentley L-series V8 engine
- Transmission: 4-speed GM 4L80-E automatic

Dimensions
- Wheelbase: 3,844 mm (151 in)
- Length: 6,220 mm (245 in)
- Width: 2,000 mm (79 in)
- Height: 1,770 mm (70 in)

The Bentley State Limousines are official state cars manufactured by Bentley as a gift for Elizabeth II on the occasion of her Golden Jubilee in 2002. The two cars produced were in service for the Queen up until her death in 2022. They have most recently been in service for Charles III. Anne, Princess Royal used the car while accompanying the Queen's coffin. Both cars are kept in the Royal Mews.

== Description ==
The vehicles' twin-turbocharged, 6.75-litre V8 engines have been modified from Bentley's Arnage R version to produce 400 hp (298 kW; 406 PS) and 616 lb⋅ft (835 N⋅m) of torque. Their maximum speed is 130 mph (209 km/h).

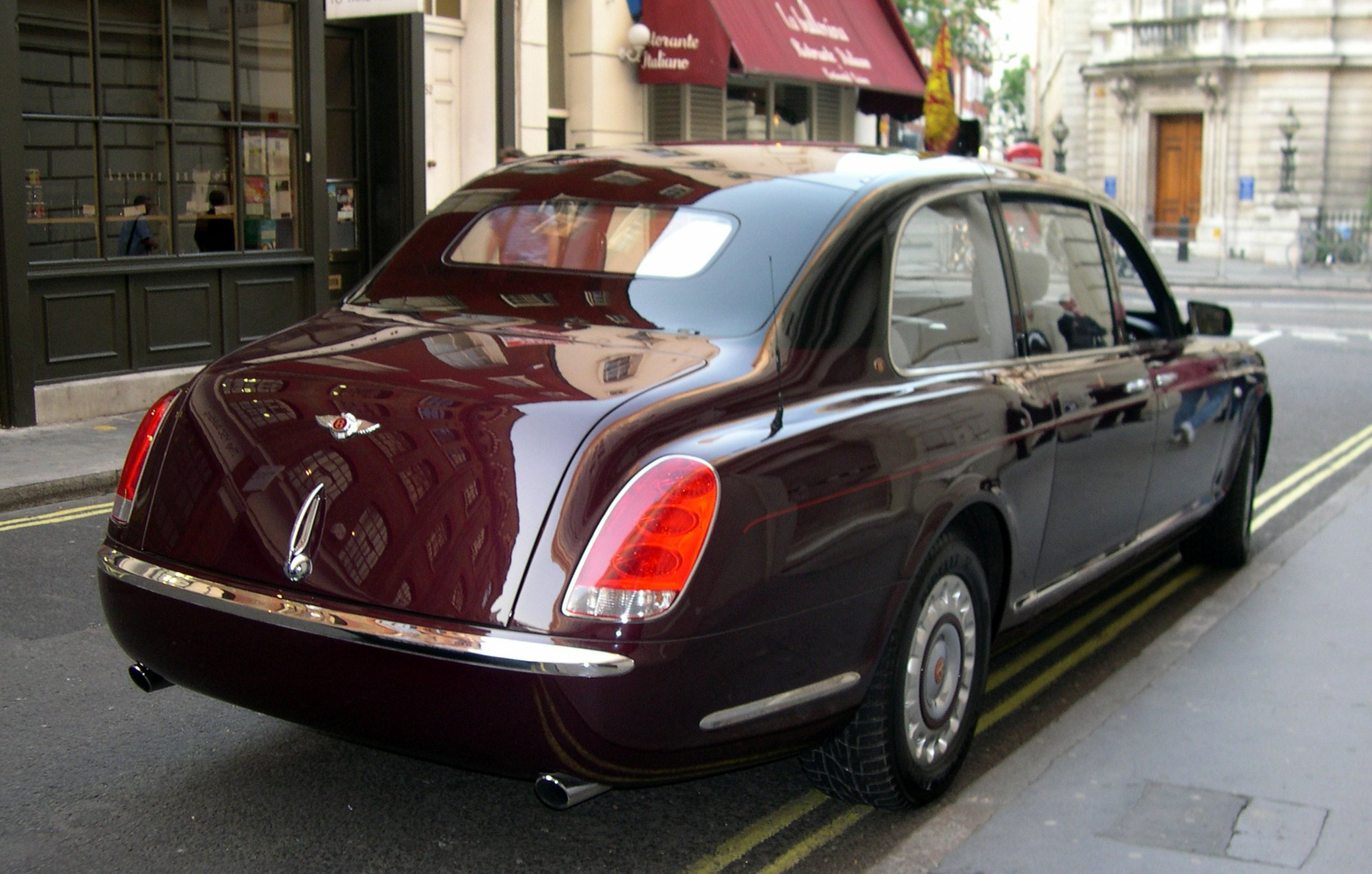
View from the rear.

The State Limousines are 83.0 cm (2 ft 8.7 in) longer than a standard Bentley Arnage, 25.5 cm (10.0 in) taller, and 6.8 cm (2.7 in) wider. They are equipped with broad coach doors opening to the rear by almost 90 degrees. Opaque panels over the rear window of the cars can either be installed for added privacy or removed for added visibility of the occupants. For protection of the occupants, the bodywork and glass are armoured, the cabin can be sealed air-tight in case of gas attack and is also blast-resistant, and the tyres are kevlar-reinforced.

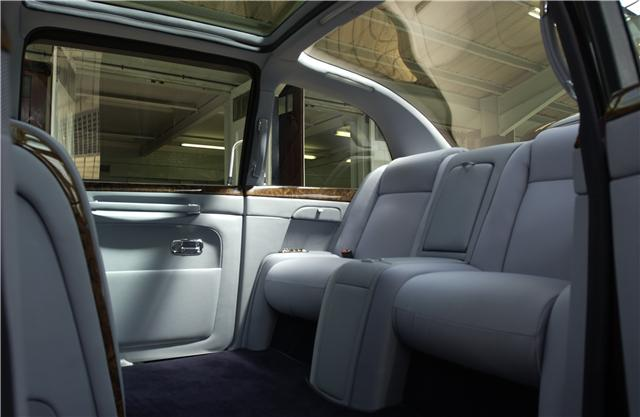
Interior view.

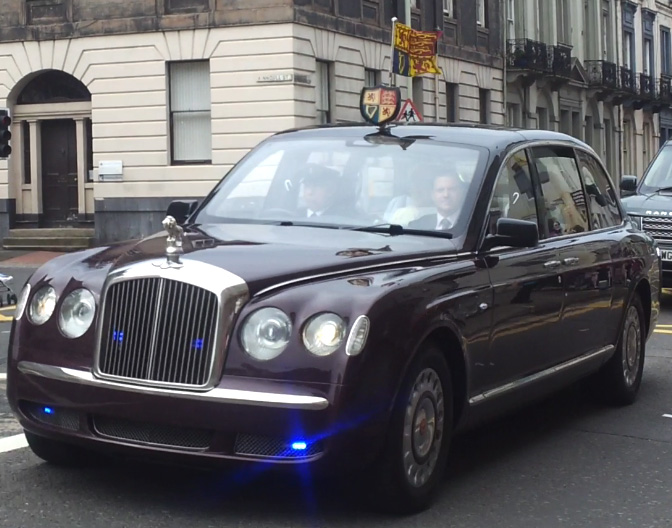
The State Limousines are equipped with flashing blue lights. The Scottish lion bonnet mascot is displayed here, as is the Royal Standard and shield for Scotland (royal visit to Perth, 2012).

The Bentleys are used mostly on official engagements and are always escorted by a selection of marked and unmarked Royal Protection Squad vehicles, along with local police vehicles and motorcycle outriders. The motorcade usually includes a support vehicle to carry staff and aides, which was previously a silver VW Transporter minibus, until replaced by a black Mercedes V-Class in 2019. Both minibuses used the registration plate 1 KUV.

The Queen also used the Bentleys at Sandringham House, and for travelling to and from Crathie Kirk when at Balmoral. Until her death in 2022, she typically used the Bentleys on the rare occasions that she travelled abroad, but also used other state cars or a vehicle provided by her hosts.

Like all British state cars, the Bentleys have a mount on the roof for an illuminated coat of arms and a flag, which can be inserted from inside the vehicle. These usually feature the royal coat of arms and the Royal Standard respectively, although other symbols can be used for occasions such as a state visit.

When carrying the Monarch, the Bentley "Flying B" bonnet mascot was replaced, either by the Monarch's personal English mascot of Saint George slaying the dragon (made by the artist Edward Seago) or, in Scotland, by a single standing lion.

The Bentleys are equipped with flashing blue lights, two within the radiator grille and two mounted on the front bumper. The State Limousines neither have nor require number plates. The Bentleys are painted claret and black, in keeping with all British state vehicles.

In January 2009, it was announced that the Bentley State Limousines would both be converted to run on biofuel.

The vehicle was showcased at the 2013 Coronation Festival in Buckingham Palace Gardens.

The two limousines are said to be valued at £10 million each.

== Production ==
British textile manufacturer Hield Brothers produced the lambswool sateen cloth used for the upholstery of the rear seats.

The unique bodywork was built by Bentley's Mulliner coachbuilding division.

Only two of these vehicles were built, making it even rarer than the Rolls-Royce Phantom IV, of which just 18 were built for royalty and heads of state.

== See also ==
- Prime Ministerial Car (United Kingdom)
