= Edward Seago =

English painter

- Seago in the 1960s
- Born: Edward Brian Seago; 31 March 1910; Norwich, England
- Died: 19 January 1974 (aged 63); London, England
- Known for: Painting
- Movement: Post-Impressionism
- Patrons: Queen Elizabeth The Queen Mother

Edward Brian Seago, RBA, ARWS, RWS (31 March 1910 – 19 January 1974) was an English artist who painted in oils and watercolours.

== Early life ==
The son of a coal merchant, Seago was born in Norwich and attended Norwich School. He was a self-taught artist (although he received advice from Sir Alfred Munnings and Bertram Priestman) and enjoyed a wide range of admirers from the British royal family and the Aga Khan to the general public. His works have been classified as either Impressionist or Post-Impressionist and included landscapes, seascapes, skyscapes, street scenes, portraits and his garden.

When aged 14, Seago won an award from the Royal Drawing Society, and from then on knew what he wanted to do in spite of his parents' initial disapproval. At the age of 18, he joined Bevin's Travelling Show, and he subsequently toured with circuses in Britain and throughout Europe.

In 1937, Seago gave evidence to a police enquiry into a blackmail gang in London's West End who exploited laws against homosexuality. His statement revealed that he had had a friendship with a young man in late 1936 who used a fake name and extracted money from Seago by deception.

In 1939, "A Rabbit Skin Cap" by Lilias Rider Haggard was published, with the front cover and all other illustrations by Seago.

== Wartime camoufleur ==
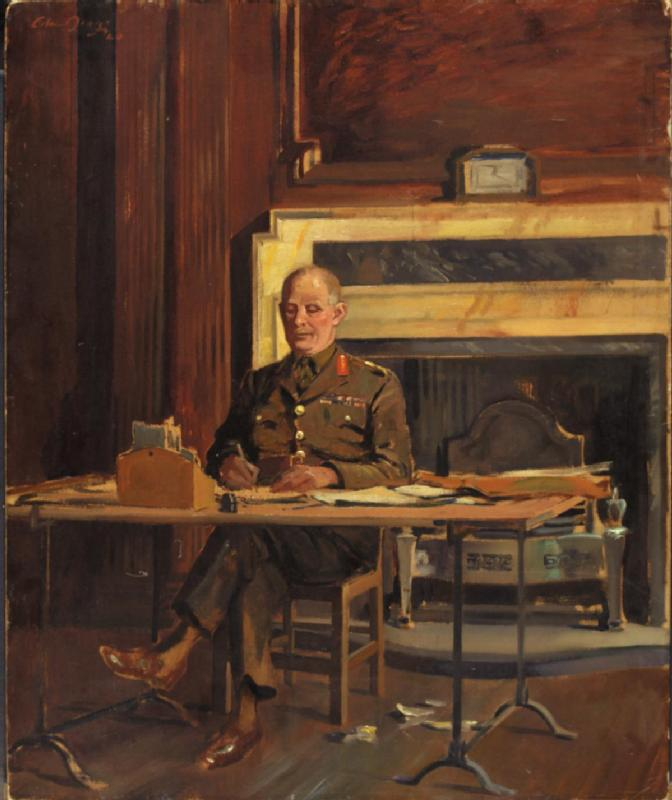
General Lord Gort, VC, at the Headquarters of the British Expeditionary Force, 1940

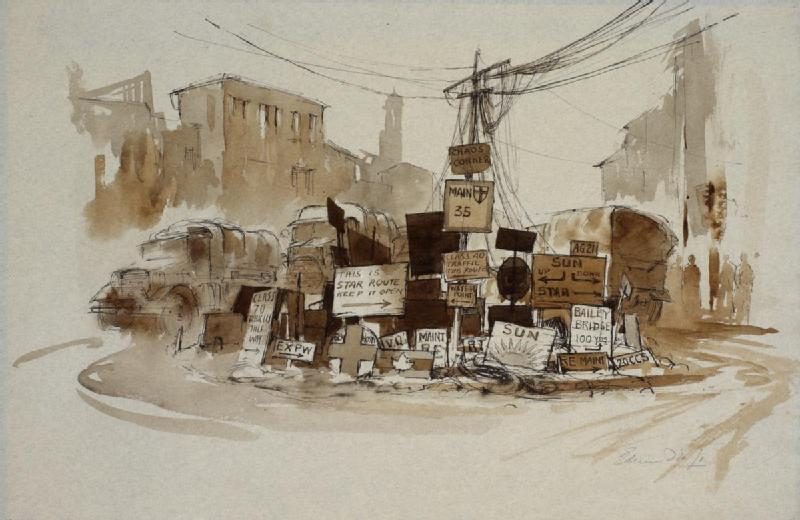
Traffic Signals - Eighth Army Area, Italy 1944

Heart problems, identified at the age of seven, dogged him all of his life. He had to resort to subterfuge to join the army at the outbreak of the Second World War. He was commissioned as a Second Lieutenant in the Royal Engineers on 3 December 1939, with the Army number 110235 and was employed on developing camouflage techniques for Field Marshal Auchinleck, with whom he had a lifelong friendship. He continued painting whilst with the Army and gave paintings to those with whom he served. Major Eddy Hodges DSO of 2nd Battalion The King's Regiment may not have been alone in folding his painting so that it fitted in the pocket of his Battle Dress blouse. Edward Seago relinquished his Commission on account of ill-health whilst serving as a War Substantive Captain and was granted the honorary rank of Major on 16 October 1944.

== Later career ==
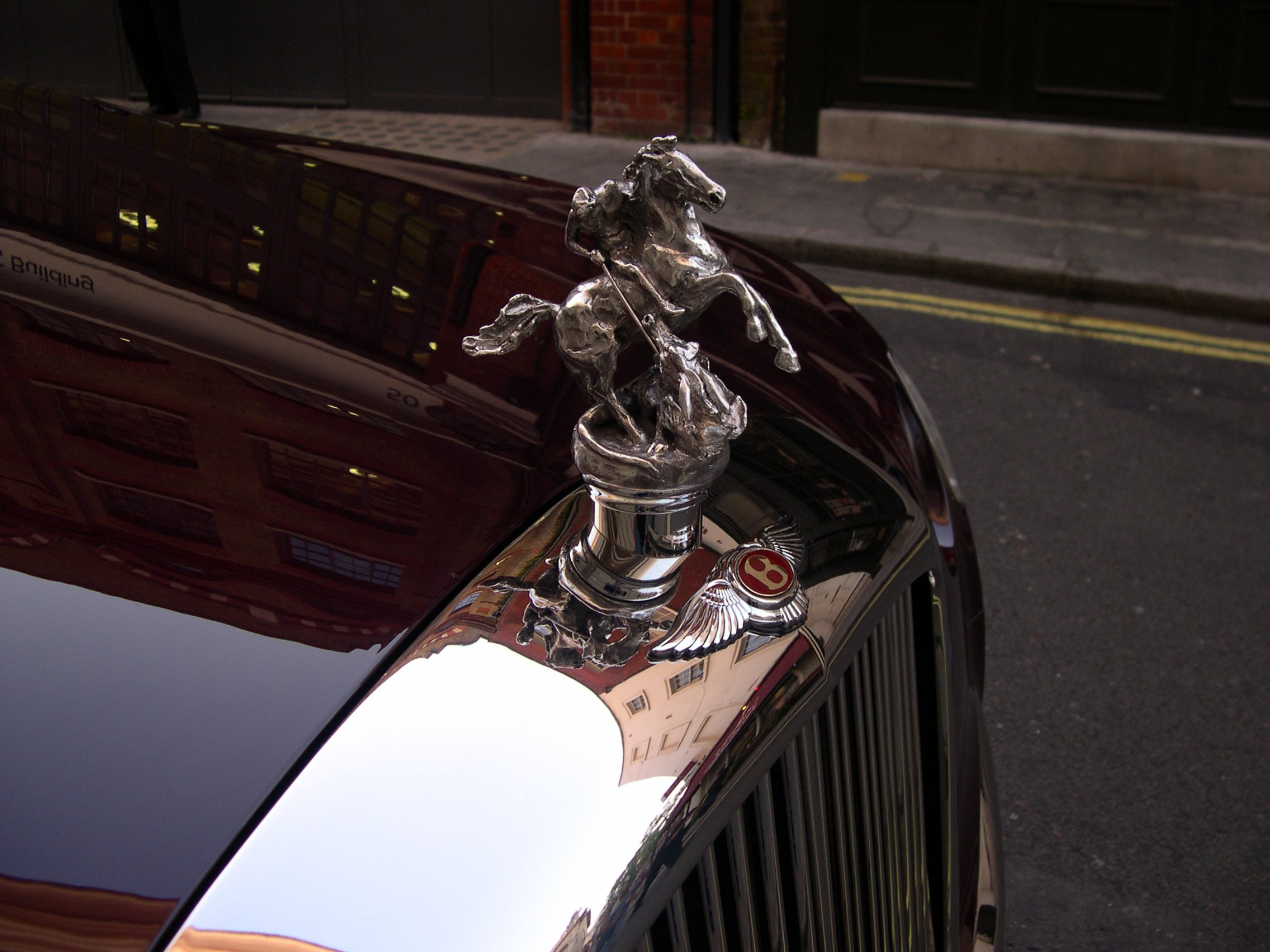
Queen Elizabeth II's 2002 Bentley State Limousine with Seago's 'George and the Dragon' mascot

His popularity was such that those who wished to buy one of his paintings had to queue (with the single exception of Queen Elizabeth The Queen Mother) at his various annual exhibitions around the world.

"The Queen Mother bought so many that eventually the artist, who died in 1974, gave her two a year – on her birthday and at Christmas. Prince Philip invited him on a tour of the Antarctic in 1956, and his subsequent paintings, considered to be among his best, hang at Balmoral."

Seago created a solid silver sculpture of St George slaying the Dragon, which serves as an automobile mascot for any state limousine in which the monarch travels. The mascot can be transferred from car to car. When the monarch is not aboard, it is substituted with the symbol of the manufacturer, such as the Rolls-Royce Spirit of Ecstasy or the Bentley "B".

Seago settled in East Anglia with Peter Seymour, his lover and studio assistant, who was also an artist.

== Legacy ==
Seago died of a brain tumour in London on 19 January 1974. In his will he requested that one-third of his paintings currently in his Norwich studio were to be destroyed. There remain about 19,000 water colours and 300 oil paintings worldwide. A major retrospective of his work was held in autumn 2008 in London, as was a Sky Arts 2 television series about Seago fronted by Selina Scott.

A Seago exhibition was held at the Portland Gallery, which represents Seago's estate, in June and July 2012. Another exhibition was mounted in June and July 2014.

To mark fifty years since Seago's death, the Portland Gallery held a sales exhibition of his oils, watercolours and drawings on 12th-28th June 2024.

== Bibliography ==
Seago's published works include:

- Circus Company (1933)
- Sons of Sawdust (1934)
- The Country Scene (1936 – forty-two paintings accompanying John Masefield's poetry)
- Tribute to the Ballet (1937 – again in conjunction with Masefield)
- Caravan (1937)
- A Generation Risen (1942)
- Peace in War (1943)
- High Endeavour (1944)
- With the Allied Armies in Italy (1945)
- A Canvas to Cover (1947 – Autobiography)
- Tideline (1948)
- With Capricorn to Paris (1956)

== Bibliography ==
- Harries, R.; Cattermole, P.; Mackintosh, P. (1991). A History of Norwich School: King Edward VI's Grammar School at Norwich. Norwich: Friends of Norwich School. ISBN 978-0-9518561-1-6.
