= Moxon Huddersfield =

British textile manufacturer

Coordinates: 53.561°N 1.812°W

- Type: Private
- Industry: Manufacturing
- Headquarters: Yew Tree Mills, Holmbridge, Holmfirth, United Kingdom
- Key people: Firas Chamsi-Pasha, Managing Director
- Products: Cloth, accessories

Moxon Huddersfield Ltd is a high-end British textile manufacturer of luxury worsted and woollen suiting fabrics. It is located at Yew Tree Mills, Holmbridge, near Holmfirth, Kirklees in Yorkshire.

== History ==
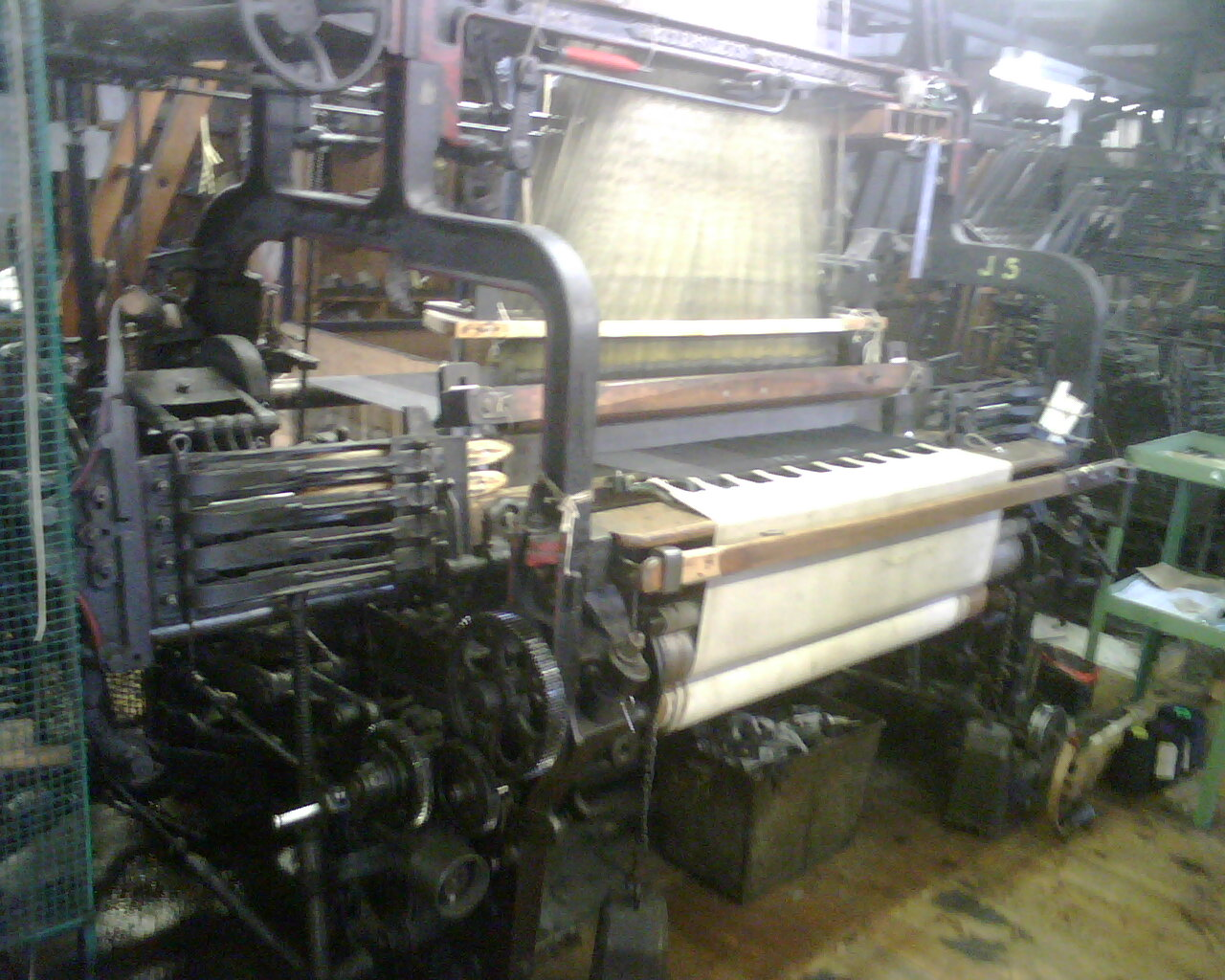
Loom at Moxon's plant, Yew Tree Mills.

The company was incorporated in 1924 but claims it can trace its roots to the 16th century. In the 1910s, it traded under the name of B. H. Moxon & Sons and was located at Springfield Mills, Kirkburton, near Huddersfield. At that time it patented an improvement to the dobby loom. In the 1930s, it was exporting to Japan and the United States. In 1950, it moved to a new 60,000 sq ft (5,600 m^{2}) site in Kirkburton. In the 1950s, it was noted for its fancy worsted fabrics, In the 1980s, it was specialized in worsted mohair and silk blends aimed primarily at the Japanese market.

Moxon was one of the first British weavers to replace British Dobcross looms with wider Swiss Sulzer looms. In the early 1960s, after the retirement of Matthew Moxon, it became part of the Tulketh Group, which went into receivership in the early 1970s. It was acquired in 1971 by the Allied Textiles group.

== Today ==
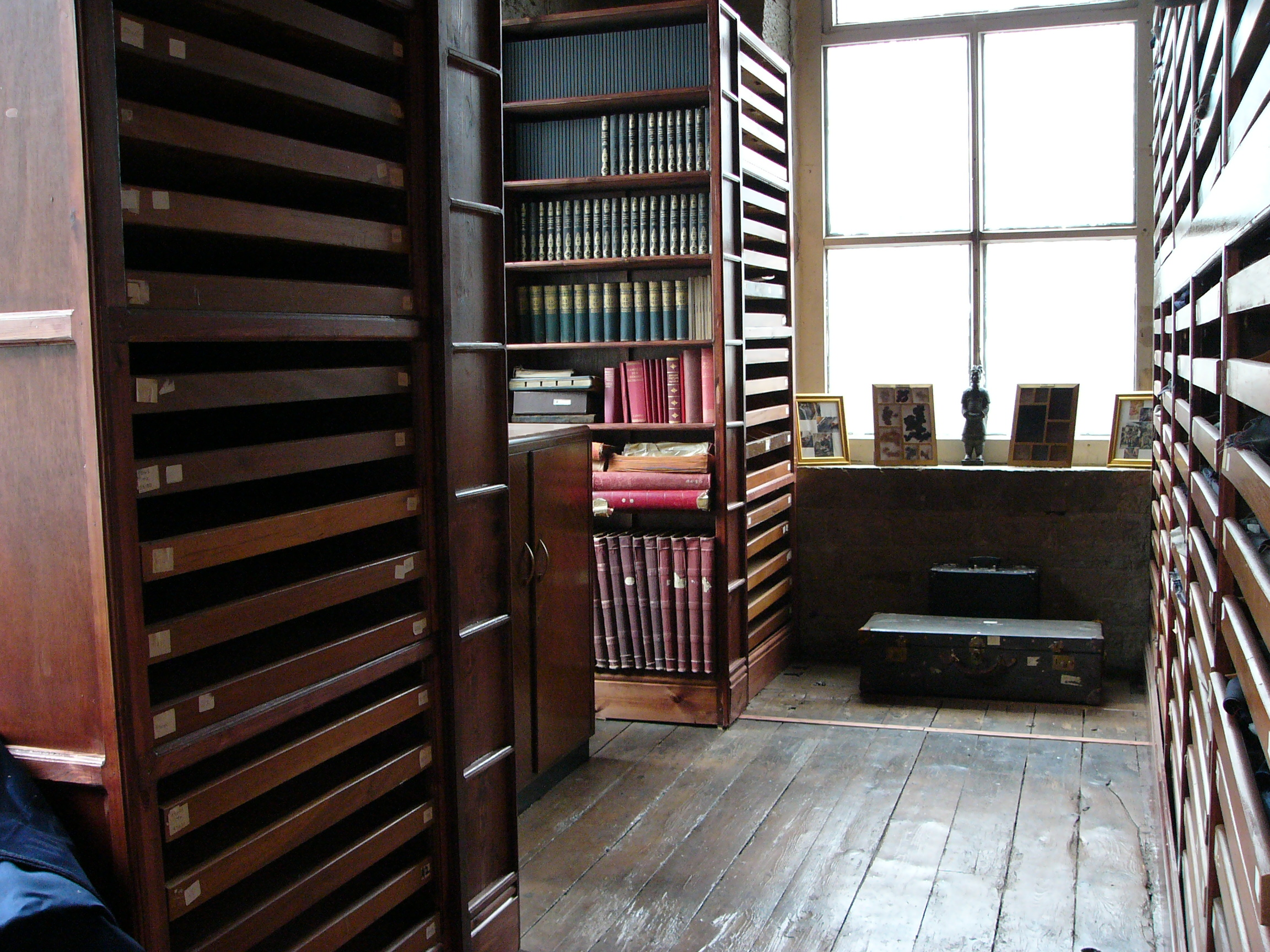
Moxon's archives, Yew Tree Mills

The company was acquired in 1993 (Note: According to other sources, the company was acquired in 1996.) by British industrialist Firas Chamsi-Pasha, formerly of textile firm Hield Brothers. (Note: According to another source, the company was bought by Chamsi-Pasha's father and the son was "asked in 1996 to look after the business".) Mr Chamsi-Pasha dropped 90% of the company's customer base and concentrated its production in the most expensive segment of the cloth market, with retail price up to £4,200 a metre in 2005 for fabrics such as a 12.9 micron wool or a super-fine wool with an 18 ct gold stripe. Mr Chamsi-Pasha marketed Super 180s fabrics in 1998 (Note: The numbering system used to describe the fineness of wool fibers has been codified by the International Wool Textile Organization and, in the United States, the Wool Suit Fabric Labeling Fairness and International Standards Conforming Act. Super 180s have an average section not wider than 14.75 microns; Super 210s, not wider than 13.25 microns; a fiber not wider than 11.5 microns is a Super 240s. Despite this "numbers game", fineness of the fiber is just one of the components of its quality, together with length, strength, color, and crimp.) and Super 210s fabrics in 2000. He claimed in 2003 that he was willing to pay "silly prices" to acquire wool with a fiber measuring less than 12 microns and had bought 26 pounds of wool with a fiber measuring 11.5 microns. The company uses antique machinery together with up-to-date equipment, such as a £120,000 scouring machine.In 2006, Joanne Alsop, then head designer of the company, won a Silver Shuttle Award from the Worshipful Company of Weavers. As of 2010, the company was using 8 looms and producing about 500 single pieces or 35,000 metres per year, using archives going back to the 1930s for ideas. As of 2011, its fabric are priced between £300 ($480) and £11,000 ($17,600) per metre. 95% of the production is exported.

== Cashmere socks ==
In 1999, the company introduced socks woven with a very fine cashmere from the Altai region. They were priced at £400 ($640) in 2011. (Note: The alleged price of these socks varies extensively. Other sources quote $400 in 2010, or "£200-plus" ($320) in 2011.) The company claims to sell 140 pairs per year.
