= Joseph Osmundson =

American biophysicist and writer

- Born: 1983 (age 42–43)
- Education: Rockefeller University (PhD)
- Scientific career
- Fields: Molecular biophysics
- Workplaces: New York University
- Doctoral advisor: Seth Darst

Joseph S. Osmundson (born 1983) is an American biophysicist and writer. He is a Clinical Associate Professor of Biology at New York University. Osmundson is the author of various books exploring bodies, queerness, race, and geography.

== Education ==
Osmundson has a Doctor of Philosophy in Molecular Biophysics from the Rockefeller University. His 2012 dissertation was titled rRNA Promoters as Targets for Transcription Factors: Structural and Functional Studies of PhERI and CarD. His doctoral advisor was Seth Darst.

== Career ==
Osmundson's research on protein structure and function has been published in scientific journals such as Cell and PNAS. He is currently a Clinical Associate Professor of Biology at New York University.

Osmundson’s creative work on bodies, queerness, race, and geography has appeared, among others, in Medium, The Village Voice, the Los Angeles Review of Books, Gawker, Guernica, the Kenyon Review, the Lambda Literary Review, and the Feminist Wire, where he is an associate editor. His 2016 book Capsid: A Love Song won the POZ Award for best HIV writing (fiction/poetry) and was a finalist for a Lambda Literary Award, and his second book, INSIDE/OUT, was published in January 2018. With fellow queer writers Dennis Norris II, Tommy Pico, and Fran Tirado, he co-hosts Food 4 Thot, a podcast "at the intersection of queerness and brownness," with subject matters ranging "from Beyoncé to Borges, politics to peen sizes, Nietzsche to 90s R&B."

Osmundson's third book, Virology, was published in June 2022 by Norton. The essay collection focusses on "the social and scientific impact of viruses through the lens of queer theory, race, capitalism, and the legacy of HIV/AIDS activism". The New York Times said, "Osmundson writes with the disarming voice of that teacher who makes science cool, even radical."

In 2022, Time included Osmundson on their Time100 Next list of emerging leaders, citing Osmundson as, "instrumental in guiding New York City’s [mpox] vaccine distribution, helping implement a program that brings shots to places where people meet for sex and pushing for more inclusive eligibility criteria."

== Selected works ==
=== Books ===
- Capsid: A Love Song (Indolent Books, 2016), ISBN 978-1-945023-03-3
- INSIDE/OUT (Sibling Rivalry Press, 2018), ISBN 978-1-943977-44-4
- Virology: Essays for the Living, the Dead, and the Small Things in Between (Norton, 2022), ISBN 978-0-393-88136-3
- Spawning Season: An Experiment in Queer Parenthood (Bloomsbury, 2026) ISBN 978-1639737833

== See also ==
- LGBT people in science
- LGBT culture in New York City
