= Channing Robertson =

American chemical engineer (born 1943)

- Born: Channing Rex Robertson; 1943 (age 82–83)
- Education: University of California, Berkeley (BS); Stanford University (MS, PhD)
- Spouse: Donna Reineke
- Scientific career
- Fields: Chemical engineering
- Workplaces: Stanford University; Theranos
- Thesis: Low Reynolds number shear flow past a rotating circular cylinder: momentum and heat transfer (1970)
- Academic advisors: Andreas Acrivos
- Doctoral students: Seth Darst
- Other notable students: Elizabeth Holmes
- Website: Official website

Channing Rex Robertson (born 1943) (Note: As per age 59 in 2003.) is a professor emeritus of chemical engineering at Stanford University. He held multiple significant roles at startup Theranos, founded by his student Elizabeth Holmes. Robertson took on major responsibilities at the company prior to its collapse, including becoming its first board member, engaging with venture capitalists, and recruiting biochemist Ian Gibbons. He retired from Stanford in 2012, becoming professor emeritus. Theranos named him the co-leader of their technology advisory board in 2017. He was called as a witness in United States v. Elizabeth A. Holmes, et al., which convicted Holmes and partner Sunny Balwani of criminal fraud. During his time working for Holmes, Robertson was paid US$500,000 per year by Theranos. Since his active role in the Theranos scandal, he went back to teach one course at Stanford.

== Early life and education ==
Robertson spent the early part of his life in Los Angeles, California. He went to Herbert Hoover High School in Glendale, California, where he met his wife, Donna Reineke. Reineke graduated from Hoover in 1960, with Robertson following in 1961. He received a Bachelor of Science degree in chemical engineering from the University of California at Berkeley, followed by a Master of Science in chemical engineering at Stanford University, where his focus included transport phenomena and fluid mechanics. Robertson received his Doctor of Philosophy (Ph. D) from Stanford under the supervision of Andreas Acrivos. After graduating from Stanford with his Ph. D, Robertson left academia to become a researcher for in the oil industry; later returning to Stanford to work in the field of bioengineering. Reineke became director of donor relations at Stanford in 1990. She retired from the institution in 2020.

== Academic career ==
Robertson joined the Stanford faculty in 1970. He served as the Ruth G. and William K. Bowes Professor and Senior Associate Dean for Faculty & Academic Affairs in the School of Engineering. He was an advisor to doctoral student Seth Darst. Robertson testified in 1998 as a witness for the state about the cigarette brand Marlboro related to a lawsuit against tobacco company Philip Morris USA. In 2000, he was featured in a special issue of Upside, entitled "100 People Who Have Changed the World". He was a founding fellow of the American Institute for Medical and Biological Engineering. After the collapse of Theranos, Robertson returned to Stanford as professor emeritus, teaching the course "Busting Energy Myths".

== Theranos ==
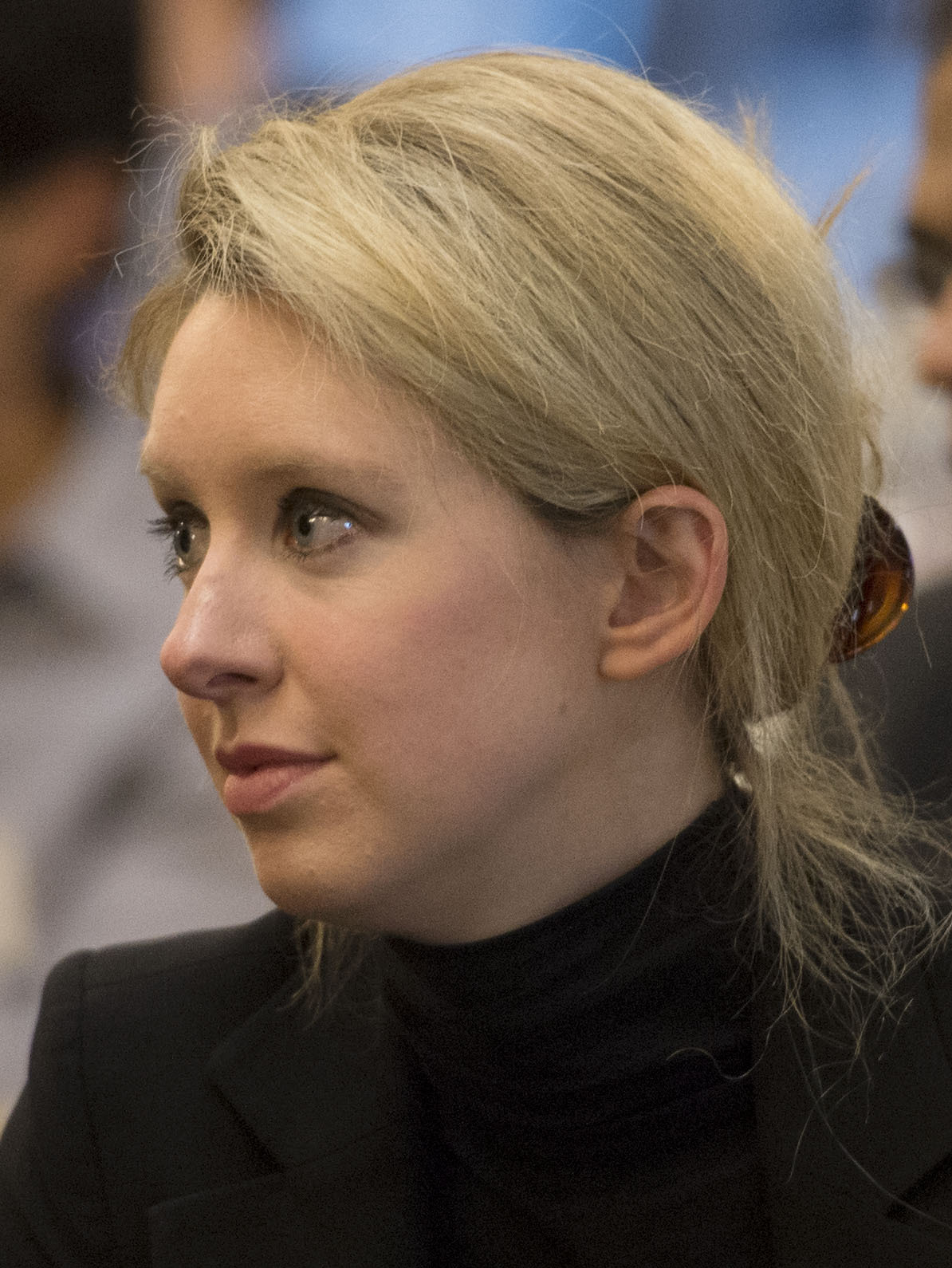
Theranos founder Elizabeth Holmes at Stanford University, April 17, 2013

Robertson taught Theranos founder Elizabeth Holmes when she was a student at Stanford. He became acquainted with her after granting her request to work in his research laboratory at Stanford amidst PhD students. Robertson was initially swayed by his student's ideas on what she felt her fledgling technology could accomplish. After Holmes dropped out, Robertson helped her start Theranos in 2003. He went on to become the company's first board member. Robertson gave up his tenured position in order to work at Theranos. Along with Robertson, his associate from his lab Shaunak Roy also joined Holmes at Theranos and became its co-founder. Shaunak and Holmes had previously worked together in Robertson's lab at Stanford. Robertson brought venture capitalists to meet with Holmes about her early business venture. He convinced Ian Gibbons to work for Theranos in 2005. Robertson and Gibbons had previously worked together in the 1980s and co-authored a patent at Biotrack Laboratories. Gibbons brought confidential concerns about Theranos to Robertson in confidence, including the fact that the technology was not working. Gibbons asked Robertson to keep his private comments about Theranos between them. Robertson then immediately shared Gibbons's concerns with Holmes, who fired Gibbons.

Holmes kept a quote from Robertson featured on her desk: "You start to realize you are looking in the eyes of another Bill Gates, or Steve Jobs." After receiving this assessment from Robertson, Holmes later began to dress like Jobs. Robertson was included in activities related to Holmes's personal life, and was a featured guest at her 30th birthday party at the home of fellow Theranos board member and former United States Secretary of State George Shultz.

According to criminal filings by prosecutors in United States v. Elizabeth A. Holmes, et al., Robertson was paid approximately US$463,000 by Theranos from March 2015 to February 2016. In 2017, Theranos named him the co-leader of their technology advisory board. Brian Grossman, PFM Health Sciences chief investment officer, testified that he spoke with and relied upon Robertson's expertise prior to his firm's $96 million investment in Theranos. Robertson assured him Theranos's technology was sound and years ahead of competitors. Robertson stated to Grossman that the only risk related to the company was with customer experiences. After speaking with Robertson, Grossman felt confident in his firm's investment in Theranos. Grossman testified under oath as to his conversation with Robertson about Theranos, in the U.S. government's criminal trial against Holmes. Robertson kept what was happening at Theranos secret, and did not tell his wife what was happening at the company.

Following a report by Wall Street Journal investigative journalist John Carreyrou on questionable medical practices at Theranos, Robertson defended the company in an interview with Bloomberg Businessweek. Robertson told Bloomberg Businessweek, "We would have to be certifiable", to go live with actual medical patients with a product that impacted individuals' health, with foreknowledge the tests were not dependable. In the same interview, Robertson classed Holmes among geniuses including Leonardo da Vinci, Wolfgang Amadeus Mozart, Albert Einstein, and Isaac Newton.

As late as May 2018, Robertson believed the company was successful in developing novel blood testing technology. According to lawyer Reed Kathrein, who sued Theranos on behalf of some of its former investors, the company only paid Robertson to lend itself credibility. Robertson maintained ties to Theranos, continuing to both work at the company and serve on its board of directors until 2018. Kathrein said Holmes, "compensated him very, very well. From 2013 through 2017 she paid him more than anyone else at the company. ... From what I can tell, she paid him $500,000 a year for those four years." Robertson confirmed his income in testimony during litigation between Theranos and Richard Fuisz. Kathrein described Robertson as the person in the world who "would have known the right questions to ask". Robertson was a witness in U.S. v. Holmes, at the conclusion of which Holmes and partner Sunny Balwani were convicted of criminal fraud.

== In media ==
The Wall Street Journal investigative journalist John Carreyrou delved into the manner in which Elizabeth Holmes courted Robertson to involve himself in her company Theranos; he recounted this in-depth in his 2018 book, Bad Blood: Secrets and Lies in a Silicon Valley Startup. This relationship was investigated further in the 2019 Alex Gibney documentary, The Inventor: Out for Blood in Silicon Valley. Rebecca Jarvis delved into the early background between Robertson and Holmes, in her 2019 podcast about Theranos, The Dropout. In the 2022 American biographical television drama miniseries The Dropout, based on the Jarvis podcast of the same name, Robertson was portrayed by actor Bill Irwin.

== See also ==
- Bad Blood: Secrets and Lies in a Silicon Valley Startup
- The Dropout
- Ian Gibbons (biochemist)
- The Inventor: Out for Blood in Silicon Valley
