= Jesus Hates Zombies =

Graphic novel series

- Created by: Stephen Lindsay

Publication information
- Publisher: 215Ink
- Schedule: Semi-Annually
- Title(s): Those Slack-Jaw Blues; Yea Though I Walk
- Genre: Post-apocalyptic
- Publication date: October 2007
- Number of issues: 5
- Main character(s): Jesus Christ

Creative team
- Writer(s): Stephen Lindsay; Those Slack-Jaw Blues; Michael Bartolotta
- Penciller(s): Those Slack-Jaw Blues; Lauren Monardo; Those Slack-Jaw Blues; Michael Bracco; Those Slack-Jaw Blues; Jeff McComsey; Those Slack-Jaw Blues; Andy Pollock; Those Slack-Jaw Blues; Mark Lauthier; Those Slack-Jaw Blues; Danilo Beyruth; Those Slack-Jaw Blues; Stephanie O'Donnell; Yea, Though I Walk Vol. 1 Steve Cobb; Yea, Though I Walk Vol. 2,3,4; Daniel Thollin
- Letterer(s): Yea, Though I walk Stephen Lindsay
- Editor(s): Those Slack-Jaw Blues; Peter Simeti; Yea, Though I Walk; Erin Kohut

Reprints
- Collected editions
- Jesus Hates Zombies: Those Slack-Jaw Blues: ISBN 0-9797874-5-9

Jesus Hates Zombies is a series of graphic comic novels written by Stephen Lindsay, with art by various artists. Yea, Though I Walk was drawn by Steve Cobb in the first issue and Daniel Thollin for the remaining issues.

== Publication history ==
Those Slack-Jaw Blues was originally self-published by Stephen Lindsay in October 2007. It was then re-published by Alterna Comics in November 2007. All four volumes of Yea, Though I Walk were also published by Alterna Comics until May 2010.

Jesus Hates Zombies has moved publishers to 215Ink with a collection of all the Jesus Hates Zombies stories to date and is available via 215Ink and Comixology as of February 2020.

== Plot ==
In a not so distant future, zombies have overrun the earth. Fearing for the future of humanity, God sends his son Jesus Christ to save humanity. Upon returning, he finds that his powers are greatly diminished as they are tied to others' faith in him. So he sets out to find the last remaining faithful and rally them to his cause.

Along the way he comes across various friends including Mother Teresa, Elvis Presley, a stripper named King, and a time traveling Abraham Lincoln.

== Collected editions ==
The series was released in a variety of forms. The first stories were in a standard sized anthology. Yea, Though I Walk was serialized in a series of 4 digest size books:

- Those Slack-Jaw Blues (144 pages, November 2007, ISBN 0-9797874-5-9)
- Jesus Hates Zombies/Lincoln Hates Werewolves: Yea, Though I Walk Vol. 1 (64 pages, September 2008, ISBN 0-9797874-8-3)
- Jesus Hates Zombies/Lincoln Hates Werewolves: Yea, Though I Walk Vol. 2 (64 pages, April 2009, ISBN 1-934985-10-4)
- Jesus Hates Zombies/Lincoln Hates Werewolves: Yea, Though I Walk Vol. 3 (64 pages, November 2009, ISBN 1-934985-15-5)
- Jesus Hates Zombies/Lincoln Hates Werewolves: Yea, Though I Walk Vol. 4 (64 pages, May 2010, ISBN 1-934985-18-X)

== Other media ==
Michael Mongillo wrote the screenplay along with actor Jason Alan Smith and was originally slated to helm the project as director, however, Mongillo has since moved into a Producer role and directing responsibilities have been taken up by actor Eric Balfour. Mali Elfman and Jason Alan Smith are also on board to Produce.

The movie is in development as of February 2020.

== See also ==
- Loaded Bible
- The Walking Dead (comics)
