= Die Kitty Die =

- Cover of Die Kitty Die Graphic Novel

Publication information
- Publisher: Chapterhouse Comics
- Main character(s): Kitty Ravencraft

Creative team
- Created by: Dan Parent, Fernando Ruiz
- Written by: Dan Parent, Fernando Ruiz
- Penciller(s): Dan Parent, Fernando Ruiz
- Inker(s): Rich Koslowski
- Colorist(s): Glen Whitmore
- Editor(s): Tony White

Die Kitty Die is a comic book series created, written, and drawn by Dan Parent and Fernando Ruiz originally under their comic imprint Astrocomix. It is funded by various Kickstarter campaigns and subsequently published by Chapterhouse Comics. The comic stars Kitty Ravencraft, a beautiful and magical young witch who is the star of her own popular comic book. When her greedy, publicity-starved publisher wants to increase interest in her comic book, he sets out to kill his main character, Kitty, in the comic and in real life. The comic parodies Harvey Comics and Archie Comics characters and often lampoons and satirizes the comic book industry.

== Publication history ==
The first Die Kitty Die series (four issues) was funded by Kickstarter and published in 2016. The second series Die Kitty Die: Hollywood or Bust was also funded by Kickstarter and published in 2017. A third series Die Kitty Die: Heaven & Hell was also funded by Kickstarter and published in 2018. A fourth Kickstarter (and also Indiegogo) campaign for the fourth series Die Kitty Die: Starstruck was funded in 2020.

A number of one-shots have also been published. Die Kitty Die Christmas Special #1 was published in December 2017. Die Kitty Die: I Love You to Death #1 was published as a 2018 Free Comic Book Day edition. Die Kitty Die Presents Kitty's Cathouse of Horror Halloween Special was published in November 2018.

== Characters ==
- Kitty Ravencraft
- Katty (Kitty's evil cousin)
- Derek (Kitty's ex-husband)
- Linda-Louise Carney (Kitty's conjoined twin friends whose family are the subject of a reality show.)
- Dippy the Dead Kid
- Lil Satan
- Maxie Millions
- Rudy
- Mara
- Assie

Cameos:

- Super Fan Adam Alamo
- Kitty Cosplayer Shazzer VS
- Gisele Lagace
- Fernando Ruiz
- Dan Parent

== Notable facts ==
Shazzer VS is recognized by Parent and Ruiz as the original cosplayer for Kitty Ravencraft. Her first Kitty costume debuted at New York Comic Con in 2016, the same year the original Die Kitty Die series was published. She has since created over five Kitty looks for various conventions. She is often referred to as "The 'Real' Kitty Ravencraft".

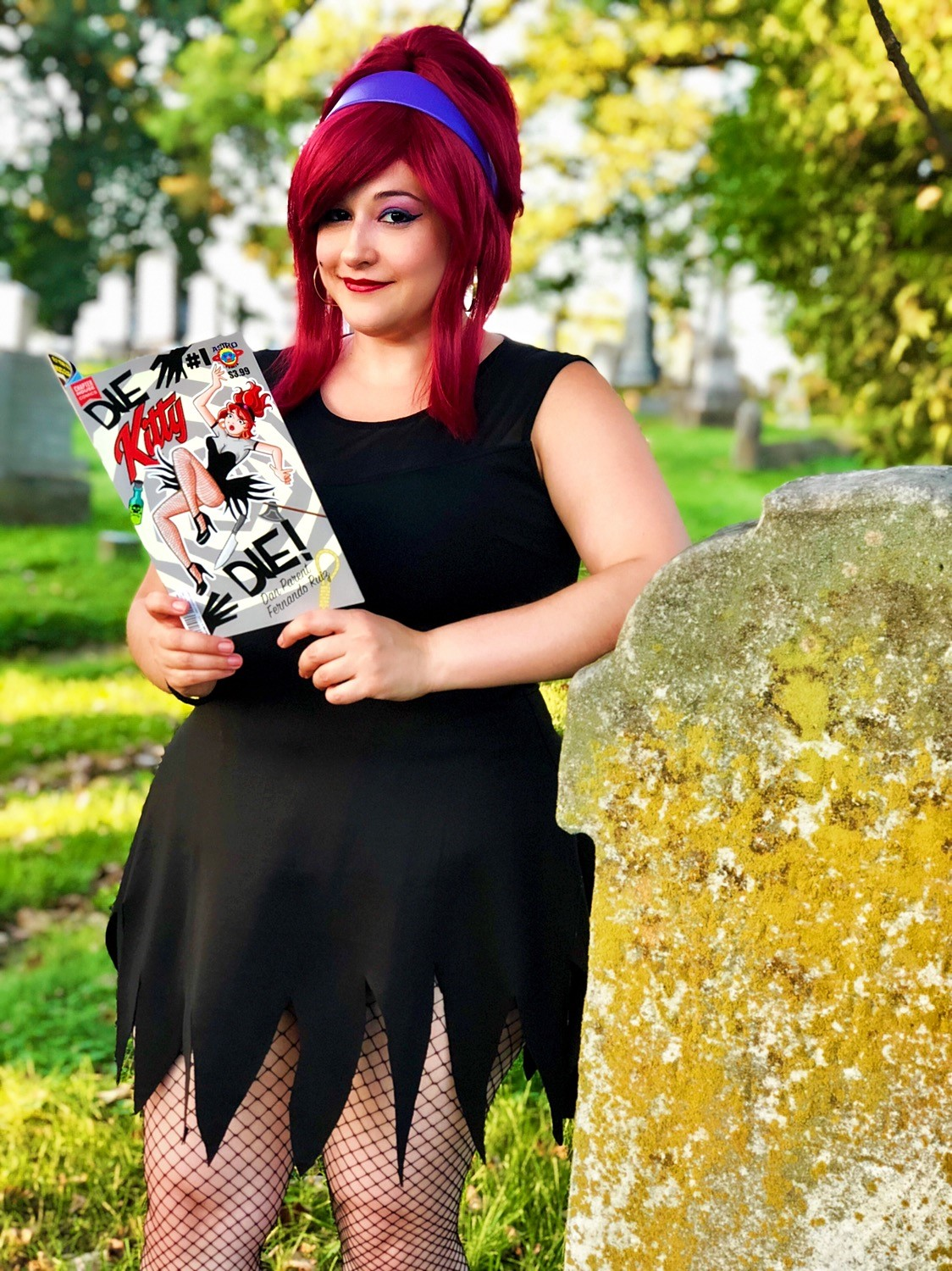
Cosplayer Shazzer VS as Kitty Ravencraft

Super fan Adam Alamo created the first Facebook Fan Group, Fans of Astrocomix, for Die Kitty Die (Astrocomix) in 2016 to help promote the first Kickstarter.
