= American Terror =

Graphic novel and comic series

American Terror: Confessions of a Human Smart Bomb is a graphic novel / comic series written and illustrated by Jeff McComsey with co-writing by James Cooper (Vol 1). The graphic novels are distributed by indie publisher Alterna Comics. Two volumes that have been released. A third volume is in production.

== Synopsis ==
The story follows the life of Victor Sheppard, a rebellious individual who lives in a futuristic world where everything is seemingly at peace. No one in this dystopian future seems to remember how they got there.

== Film adaptations ==
In 2009 a short film was released, co-produced by McComsey and Joseph Krzemienski of indie animation studio, theFictory. The film uses traditional/hybrid animation and is entitled "American Terror: Company Man."
