= Jeff McComsey =

- Born: December 11, 1981 (age 44) Oxford, Pennsylvania, U.S.
- Areas: Illustrator, writer, editor, producer
- Notable works: American Terror; FUBAR; Jesus Hates Zombies; Flutter

Jeff McComsey (born December 11, 1981), is an American illustrator and author of graphic novels, animations, and video game art.

His most notable works include American Terror, a graphic novel series published through Alterna Comics, the self-published work FUBAR and the Ultimate Night of Living Dead, series Rise and Z-Men. McComsey is also the artist for Flutter, the award-winning graphic novel series published by 215 Ink.
