= Rashida Renée =

American fashion archivist and writer

Rashida Renée Ward is an American fashion archivist and writer. She maintained the Tumblr "Fuck Rashida" that was dedicated to fashion worn primarily by Black women in the 1990s and early 2000s. Ward is known for her fashion critiques posted to her Twitter and Instagram.

== Early life ==
Ward was raised in San Francisco, California. Her mother co-owned a beauty salon with her aunt and there Rashida began reading magazines like Jet, Ebony and Essence. She was particularly drawn to Naomi Campbell and credits the model as one of her earliest fashion muses.

Ward understood that she was trans from a young age, and has connected her interest in fashion to her gender. During her adolescence she was active in LGBTQ Black communities on Myspace and was introduced to ballroom, which she referred to as "a possibility model."

== Career ==
Ward's digital fashion archiving began when she joined a closed fashion group on LiveJournal. She continued to learn about different designers, as each post was credited. Ward gained prominence in the late 2000s for her Tumblr blog "Fuck Rashida" that focused on the intersection of fashion and Black culture. Her blog functioned as an archive for both well-known and lesser known fashion looks worn by celebrities from the 1990s through present day. She was as comprehensive as possible with the photos and images she posted, and included information about hair dressers, set designers, and make up artists to the extent possible. Ward also maintains her own personal archive of fashion items, and she collects Barbie dolls. She provided commentary on the costuming in Greta Gerwig's Barbie (2023).

In October 2016 Ward was the subject of Elizabeth De La Piedra's solo exhibition Rashida at 151 Gallery in New York. Her day-to-day activities were photographed over a four-day period, with Ward wearing clothing provided by ASOS.

She is active on Twitter and frequently goes viral for her posts related to fashion. As of 2020 she maintains the fashion archive How To Be a Fucking Lady on Instagram. She has been noted for her "no holds barred" approach to critique and has provided commentary to New York, Interview, and others.
