= Josh Trujillo =

American writer

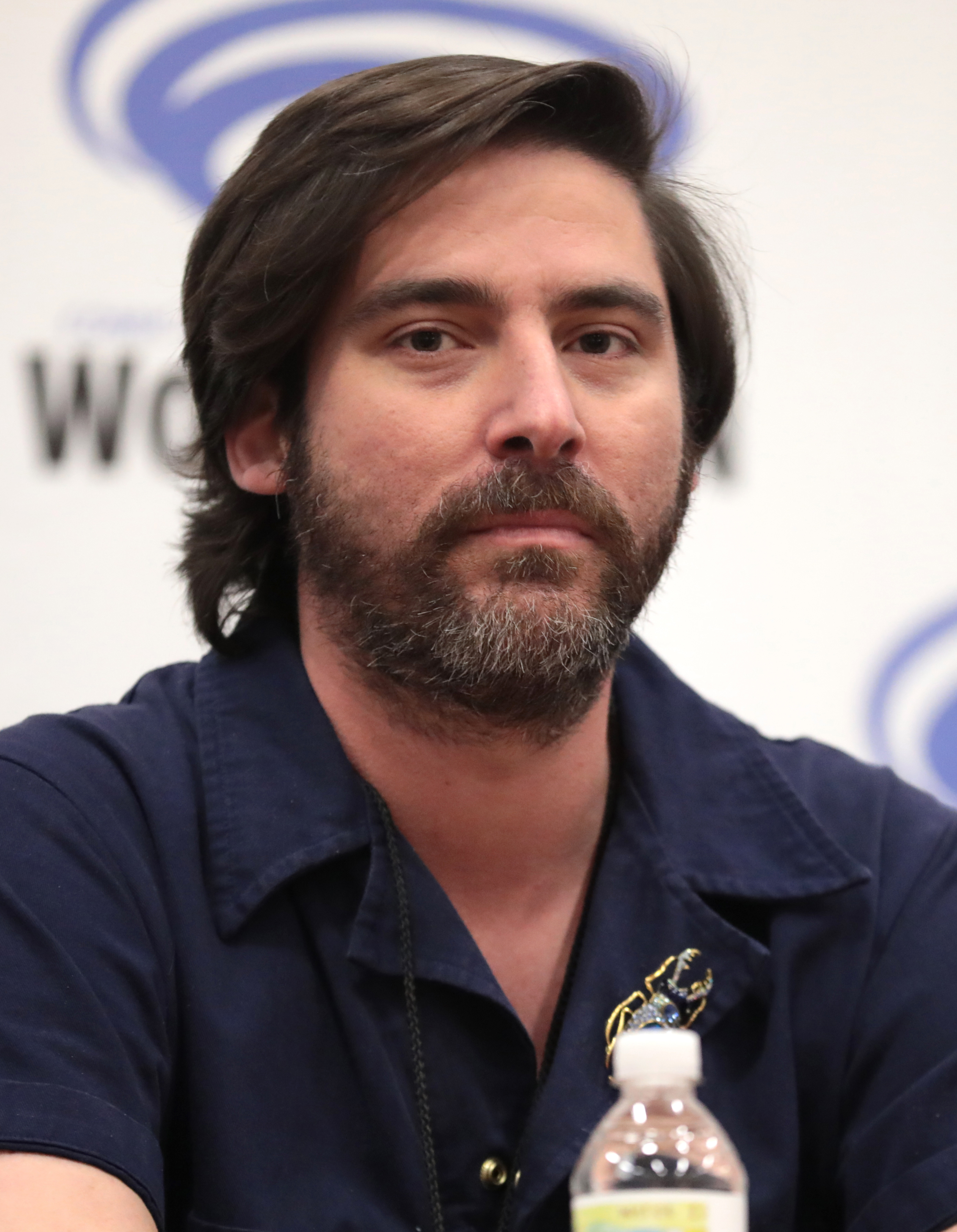
- Trujillo at the 2023 WonderCon.
- Born: Josh Trujillo Los Angeles, California
- Area: Writer
- Notable works: Adventure Time; Captain America; Rick and Morty; Blue Beetle

Josh Trujillo is an American writer known for his work on comic book franchises such as Adventure Time, Captain America, Blue Beetle, and Rick and Morty.

== Career ==
Trujillo was born and lives in Los Angeles. He did not attend college, but began freelance writing in his 20s.

He first major credit came in 2016, when he contributed the story Tonight to the anthology Love is Love, produced by IDW Publishing and DC Comics. Later that year he was hired by BOOM! Studios to author three Adventure Time graphic novels, all published in 2016 as well: The Three Castles, Princess Bubblegum, and Brain Robbers.

Trujillo's self-published romance anthology Love Machines touched on stories of technology intersection with romance. "The Most Beautiful Woman In The World" told the tale of Vincente Minnelli and Lester Gaba, as well as Cynthia the "Gaba Girl". In 2018 he wrote his first comic book for the Rick and Morty series, Rick and Morty Issue 36, and he has since authored several others, including Rick and Morty: Worlds Apart. Trujillo has also written for a number of Superhero franchises, including The Flash, Wonder Woman, Superman, and Hulkling and Wiccan.

In addition to working for comic studios, Trujillo has also contributed writing to several video games, including Guardians of the Galaxy: The Telltale Series, Destruction AllStars, and Batman: The Enemy Within. In 2018, he authored his own four-issue comic book with BOOM! Studios entitled Dodge City, and in 2020 he wrote the children’s book Lost Beast, Found Friend.

Trujillo's work appears in the Ringo Award-winning anthology, MINE! A Celebration of Planned Parenthood, and the Ignatz Award-winning Be Gay, Do Comics.

In 2021, Trujillo co-created the character of Aaron Fischer with writer Christopher Cantwell and artist Jan Bazaldua. Fischer, a gay teenage runaway, is a new hero taking on the mantle of Captain America. In September 2021, it was announced Trujillo would be the writer of a one-off superhero-themed comic book about the YouTube group FaZe Clan.

He is currently writing a comic biography of Baron von Steuben for Mariko Tamaki's Surely imprint.

== Personal life ==
Trujillo is openly gay, and has been involved in activism relating to LGBTQ and Latino issues in comics and entertainment. Much of his work centers gay characters, or introducing gay themes to existing properties. In 2015, he moderated San Diego Comic Con’s first panel on queer gaming.

Writer Sina Grace has stated that the character of "Softboy" in his comic Rockstar and Softboy is based on Trujillo.

== Bibliography ==
- Aggretsuko: Out to Lunch
- Bill & Ted's Day of the Dead
