= Food 4 Thot =

LGBT podcast

- Language: English

Cast and voices
- Hosted by: Tommy Pico, Joseph Osmundson, Denne Michele, Fran Tirado

Technical specifications
- Audio format: Podcast

Publication
- Original release: February 13, 2017
- Provider: iHeartRadio

Related
- Website: food4thotpodcast.com

Food 4 Thot is an LGBT podcast hosted by Tommy Pico, Denne Michele Norris, Joseph Osmundson, and Fran Tirado. The podcast is described as, "A multiracial mix of queer writers talk about sex, relationships, race, identity, what we like to read, and who we like to read."

== Background ==
The four hosts met at Tin House Summer Writer's Workshop in 2016. In an interview with The Stranger, the hosts said, "The podcast’s conception stemmed from a discussion about how literary and intellectual spaces rarely allowed for conversations about things typically considered—well, not so intellectual. We loved talking about queer theory, identity politics, and Ta-Nehisi Coates, but also Mariah Carey’s Vine account, nail polish, and our absolutely filthiest hook-up stories. In a world where those conversations were so often separated, where could one get both?" The New York Times described the podcast as "boisterous, intellectual and sometimes profane".

Alexander Chee, Melissa Febos, Steven Canals, Alok Vaid-Menon, Bowen Yang, Jenna Wortham, and Ashley C. Ford have all appeared as guests on the podcast.

Food 4 Thot's second season was produced in partnership with the dating app, Grindr, and was available to stream on the app In July 2019, they joined the iHeartRadio podcast network.

== Hosts ==
Tommy Pico is the author of four books of poetry and is a National Book Award and Whiting Award winner.

Joseph Osmundson has a PhD from The Rockefeller University in Molecular Biophysics and is a Clinical Assistant Professor of Biology at New York University. He has written three books, including the essay collection Virology released in 2022.

Denne Michele Norris is a writer and former figure skater. In 2021 she was announced as the new Editor-in-Chief of Electric Literature. She is the first Black, out trans woman to helm a major literary publication.

Fran Tirado is the Executive Editor at the online LGBT magazine Them. Prior positions include Deputy Editor of Out magazine and Executive Editor of Hello Mr.

== Reception ==
Food 4 Thot has been featured on Time's list of "The 50 Best Podcasts to Listen to Right Now", writing "Sex positivity is a major theme of each episode, a topic still all-too-rare in the podcasting world." The podcast has also been recommended by The Advocate, Out, Oprah Magazine, InStyle, Vice, Vulture, and Dazed. The podcast was nominated for Best LGBTQ Podcast at the 2019 iHeartRadio Podcast Awards.

== See also ==
- List of LGBT podcasts
