= Seth Darst =

American chemist

Seth A. Darst
- Education: University of Colorado at Boulder
- Known for: Enzymes of transcription
- Awards: Pew Scholar
- Scientific career
- Fields: Biochemistry
- Workplaces: Rockefeller University
- Doctoral advisor: Channing Robertson
- Doctoral students: Joseph Osmundson

Seth A. Darst is a Jack Fishman Professor of molecular biophysics at the Rockefeller University. He was elected to the United States National Academy of Sciences in 2008.

== Life and career ==
Darst earned his B.S. in chemical engineering from the University of Colorado at Boulder in 1982. He continued his education with advisor Channing Robertson at Stanford University, where he earned both M.S. (1984) and Ph.D. (1987) degrees in chemical engineering. Darst completed postdoctoral training, also at Stanford, as an American Cancer Society Postdoctoral Fellow and a Lucille P. Markley Postdoctoral Scholar in the laboratory of Roger D. Kornberg. He joined the faculty at the Rockefeller University in 1992. Darst's research centers on the structural basis of transcription by exploring the enzymes involved in the process.

== Honors and awards ==
- 2008 – Elected to the United States National Academy of Sciences
- 1995 – Pew Scholar in the Biomedical Sciences
- 1994 – Irma T. Hirschl Charitable Trust Career Scientist
