= Lambswool =

Textile

Lambswool is wool which is 50 millimetres (2 in) or shorter from the first shearing of a sheep, at around the age of seven months. It is soft, elastic, and slippery, and is used in high-grade textiles.

Weaner fleece is wool 50 millimetres (2 in) or longer from young sheep, that have been shorn for the first time, and which exhibits the characteristic lambs tip and staple structure.
