= David Darst =

American financier, educator, and author

David Martin Darst is an American financier, educator, author, and triathlete. Following his 25 years at Goldman Sachs in New York and Zurich, for 17 years, he was a Managing Director and Chief Investment Strategist of Morgan Stanley Wealth Management, where he served as Vice Chairman of the Morgan Stanley Wealth Management Global Investment Committee. He was the founding President of the Morgan Stanley Investment Group, and the founding Chairman of the Morgan Stanley Asset Allocation Committee. He has also served as an independent Senior Advisor to and a member of the Morgan Stanley Wealth Management Global Investment Committee.

Since 2017, he has served as Senior Advisor and Investment Strategist for The Family Office and since 2018, he has been Managing Director and Chief Investment Officer of Americana Partners LLC.

He is an alumni member of the Alpha of Connecticut Yale University Chapter of the Phi Beta Kappa Society, a heredity member of the Society of the Cincinnati in the State of Virginia, and a Commissioner of the White House Fellows Foundation.

== Early life ==
Darst was born in Knoxville, Tennessee, the third of five sons born to Guy Bewley Darst and Susan Mary McGinnis Darst. Darst attended Father Ryan High School in Nashville, TN and earned a high school diploma from Phillips Exeter Academy, a BA degree in Economics from Yale University, and an MBA from Harvard Business School.

== Lecturing and professional associations ==
Darst has lectured at Wharton, Columbia University, INSEAD, New York University, Washington State University, the University of Zurich, and Rice University, and for nine years, Darst served as a visiting faculty member at Yale College, Yale School of Management, and Harvard Business School. He serves on the Investment Committee of the Phi Beta Kappa Foundation, and is a CFA Charterholder and a member of the New York Society of Security Analysts and the CFA Institute. On November 3, 2011 at the Metropolitan Club in New York, Darst was inducted by Quinnipiac University into their Business Leaders Hall of Fame.

== Media appearances and publications ==
Darst has appeared frequently on CNBC, Bloomberg Television, PBS, and Fox Business, and has been profiled and/or quoted by The New York Times, The Wall Street Journal, Financial Times, Barron's, Worth magazine, and the Yale Economic Review. Darst has also been an occasional contributor of articles to Forbes.com.

== Books ==
- The Complete Bond Book (McGraw-Hill ISBN 0-07-017390-7)
- The Handbook of the Bond and Money Markets (McGraw-Hill ISBN 0-07-015401-5)
- The Art of Asset Allocation (McGraw-Hill ISBN 0-07-137950-9)
- The Art of Asset Allocation, Second Edition, (McGraw-Hill ISBN 0-07-159294-6)
- Mastering the Art of Asset Allocation (McGraw-Hill ISBN 0-07-146334-8)
- Benjamin Graham on Investing (McGraw-Hill ISBN 978-0-07-162142-7)
- The Little Book that Saves Your Assets (John Wiley ISBN 978-0-470-25004-4; a bestseller in The New York Times and Business Week weekly rankings)
- The Little Book that STILL Saves Your Assets (John Wiley ISBN 978-1-118-42352-3)
- Voyager 3: Fifty-four Phases of Feeling (Seapoint Books ISBN 978-0-9830622-2-6)
- Portfolio Investment Opportunities in Managed Futures (John Wiley ISBN 978-1-118-50294-5)
- Portfolio Investment Opportunities in China (John Wiley ISBN 978-1-118-50296-9)
- Portfolio Investment Opportunities in Precious Metals (John Wiley ISBN 978-1-118-50303-4)
- Portfolio Investment Opportunities in India (John Wiley ISBN 978-1-118-82425-2)
- Flim-Flam Flora (Seapoint Books ISBN 978-0-9973920-2-9)
- Questioning Quentin (Seapoint Books ISBN 978-0-9985565-4-3)
- Lulu Loves Christmas (Seapoint Books ISBN 979-8-234-20320-5)
