= Hield =

UK business

Hield Bros.
- Company type: Private
- Industry: Manufacturing, Retailing
- Founded: England, United Kingdom (1922)
- Headquarters: Briggella Mills, West Yorkshire, England
- Key people: David & Hugh Hield, Founders; Chamsi-Pasha brothers(owners)
- Products: Cloth, Clothing, Fashion
- Website: www.hield.com

Hield Bros /ˈhiːld/, or simply Hield, is an English textile manufacturer and retailer of men's clothing and luxury goods. The company was established in 1922. In addition to manufacturing cloth for its own suits, Hield produces cloth for many labels and has supplied the upholstery used in Queen Elizabeth II's custom Bentley State Limousine.

== History ==
Founded as the Hield Brothers by David and Hugh Hield in 1922 in West Yorkshire, England, Hield Bros. is based in Briggella Mills, West Yorkshire. The company was acquired by the Chamsi-Pasha family in 1981 when it was under threat of a hostile take-over.

The company manufactures cloth for both apparel and furniture, suits, shirts, neckties, knitwear, scarves and throws, shoes, luggage, small leather goods and accessories and has twice been awarded the Queen's Award for Export. Forbes magazine lists a $21,000 set of 7 Hield suits as one of the "best ways to blow your bonus".

The company has shops in London's Savile Row, Japan, the Middle East and the USA.

== Gallery ==
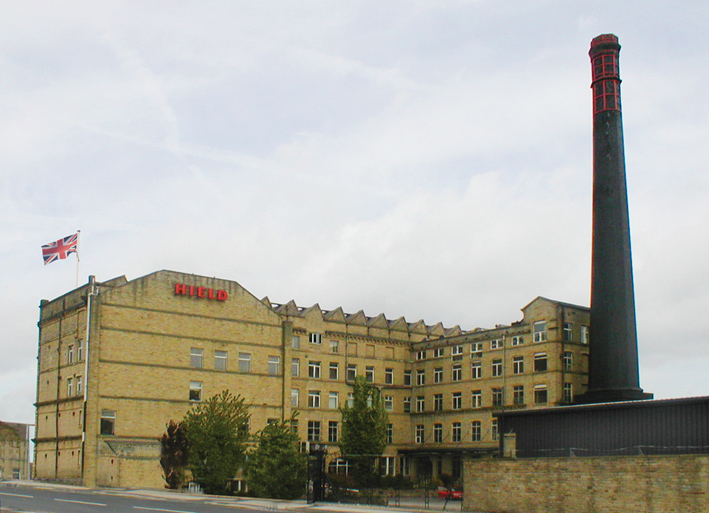
Briggella Mills, West Yorkshire, England Headquarters of Hield Bros. Ltd.

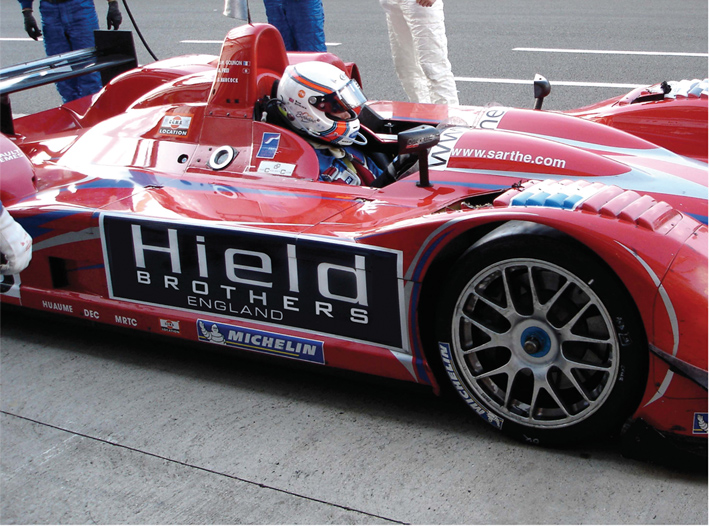
Hield-sponsored Le Mans racecar driven by British driver Sam Hancock.

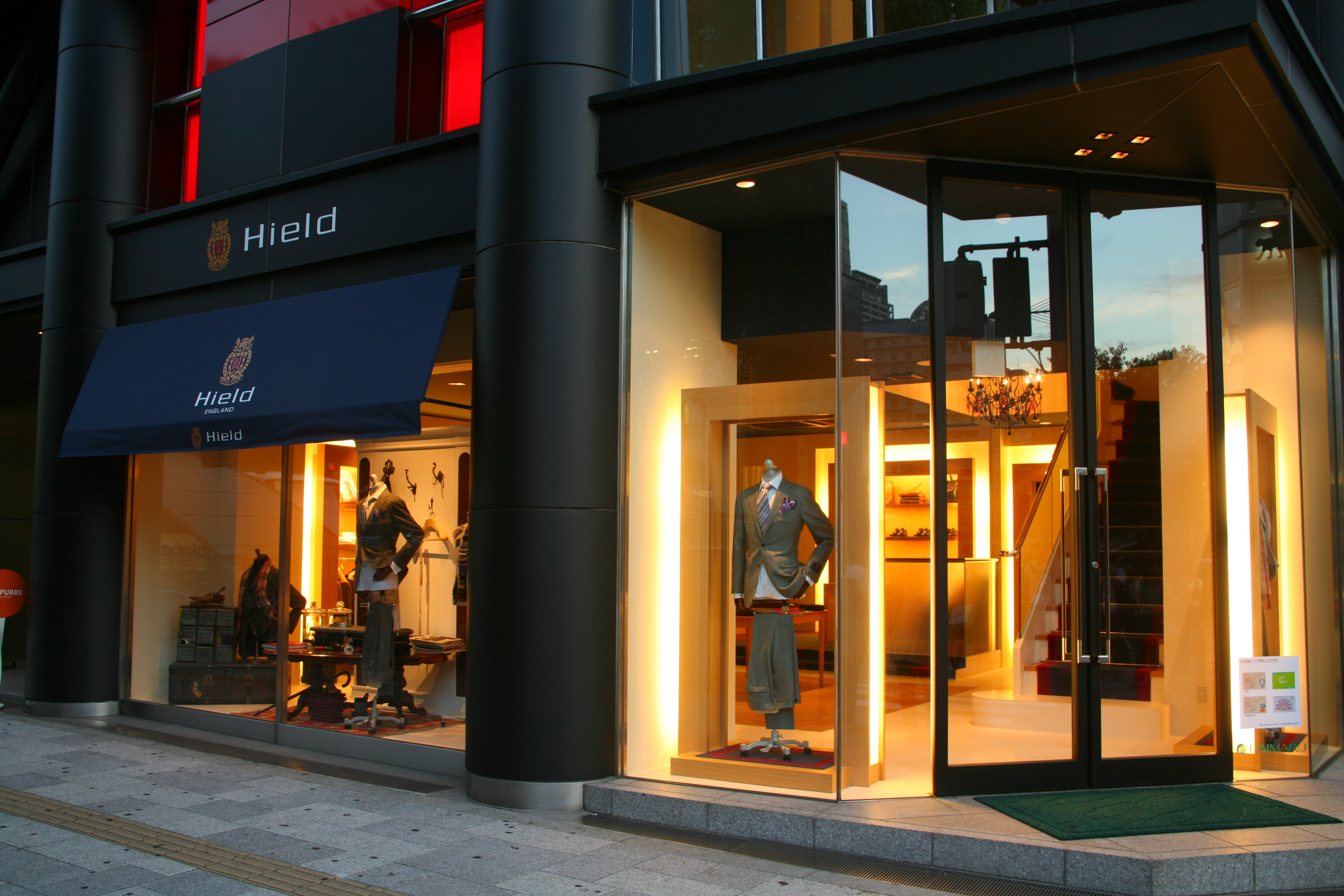
Hield Store in Osaka, Japan.

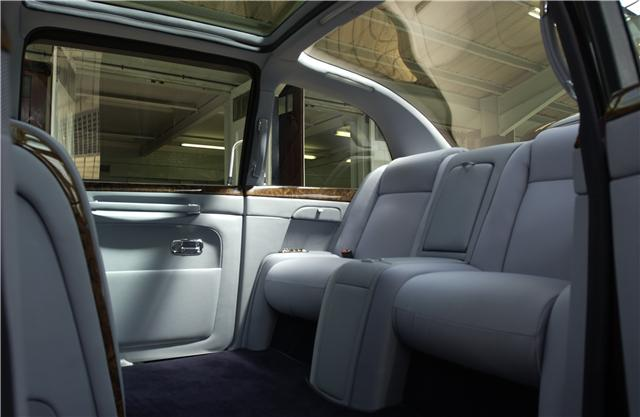
Hield Bros. Lambswool Sateen cloth seen in the interior of Queen Elizabeth II's Bentley State Limousine
