= Jay Edidin =

American cartoonist and journalist

- Born: United States
- Occupations: Cartoonist, editor, journalist, and podcaster

Jay Edidin is an American cartoonist, editor, journalist, and podcaster. He currently works as a co-presenter on the podcast Jay and Miles X-Plain the X-Men.

== Career ==
Jay Edidin worked for seven years as an editor for the American publishing house Dark Horse Comics until his departure in 2013, when he left the company to focus on his own independent projects. In 2014 he launched, with his then-husband, the podcast Jay and Miles X-Plain The X-Men, about the real and fictional history of the X-Men, a team of superheroes from the Marvel Comics.

2019 saw the publication of his first audiobook, Marvel’s Thor: Metal Gods, which he wrote in collaboration with Aaron Stewart-Ahn, Brian Keeney and Yoon Ha Lee. In 2020 he published, together with Marvel Comics, the title X-Men: Marvel Snapshots, a history centered on the origins and history of the superhero Cyclops, leader of the X-Men. In 2021 he served as the author of the webcomic Captain America Infinity Comic. In 2023, he contributed the story "Evil Mutants" starring Destiny and Mystique to Marvel's Voices: X-Men.

Throughout his career, he has worked as an author for publishing houses like Dark Horse Comics and Marvel Comics, and he has published articles in national magazines like Wired and Syfy WIRE. In 2017, he helped co-write an article that helped expose then-DC Comics editor Eddie Berganza's sexual harassment. In 2018, he helped bring to light Dark Horse's anti-trans healthcare stance, which they then reversed.

== Works ==
- Love is Love (IDW Publishing, anthology, 2016)
- Marvel’s Thor: Metal Gods (Marvel Comics, 2019)
- X-Men: Marvel Snapshots (Marvel Comics, 2020)
- Captain America Infinity Comic #1-4 (Marvel Comics, 2021)
- Marvel's Voices: X-Men (Marvel Comics, anthology, 2023)

== Podcasts ==
- Jay & Miles X-Plain the X-Men (2014–present)
- Hello from the Magic Tavern (2017, guest)
- Cerebro with Connor Goldsmith (2020, guest)
