= The Revisionaries (novel) =

2019 novel by A. R. Moxon

- Author: A. R. Moxon
- Language: English
- Genre: Science fiction
- Publisher: Melville House Publishing
- Publication date: December 3, 2019
- Publication place: United States
- Pages: 608
- ISBN: 978-1-612-19798-2

The Revisionaries is a 2019 science fiction novel by A. R. Moxon.

== Synopsis ==
On a Loony Island, crime and poverty are common. Father Julius goes around the island providing aid to people in need.

== Reception ==
The Revisionaries received generally positive reviews from critics. Amal El-Mohtar of NPR said: "I'm almost irritated by how much I enjoyed it". Ron Charles of The Washington Post said: "I was baffled, dazzled, angered and awed. In between bouts of hating it, I adored it. The Revisionaries is a self-indulgent muddle; it's a modern-day classic". Sergio De La Pava of The New York Times said: "[i]n a novel of expertly rendered horrors, the relative shallowness also disturbs, and thereby detracts. And maybe it's unfair to ask that an author this skilled at invention, character and style also exhibit proficiency in philosophy and theology".
