= Sina Grace =

American comics writer and artist

Sina Grace (born August 3, 1986) is an American comics writer, artist, memoirist, and social media personality. He is known for writing and drawing for various publishers, including DC Comics, Marvel, Image, and BOOM! Comics, including Iceman (2017–2018; 2018–2019), Go-Go Power Rangers, and Self-Obsessed (both 2019–present).

== Early life ==
Grace grew up in the suburbs of Santa Monica, in Los Angeles, California, deciding on a career in comic books in elementary school, when he would copy Batman stories and draw them himself on printer paper. Grace extended his passion for comic books throughout high school, interning for Top Cow Comics after school prior to enrolling at the University of California-Santa Cruz, majoring in creative writing.

== Career ==
After graduating from UC Santa Cruz, Grace illustrated Among The Ghosts for Buffy the Vampire Slayer's Amber Benson, and soon after became editorial director, and the very first employee, for Robert Kirkman's Skybound Comics. While at Skybound, Grace worked on titles such as The Walking Dead and Invincible, while simultaneously providing artwork for the Image Comics series The Li'l Depressed Boy with Isabell Struble.

Upon his departure from Skybound, Grace embarked on a journey of self-discovery, writing and doing artwork for the one-off releases Not My Bag (2012) and Self-Obsessed (2014), both published and released via Image Comics. Grace also released the video game send-up series Burn The Orphanage with Daniel Freedman, as well with Image Comics. During this time Grace would also produce a web-series based on his work in Self-Obsessed, along with providing artwork for musician and actress Jenny Lewis. Grace would culminate his series of memoirs with Nothing Lasts Forever in 2017, published once again by Image Comics.

In 2017 Grace was hired by Marvel Comics to write the first series for long-running character Iceman who had recently come out. Despite the series being cancelled after 11 issues in March 2018, sales and fan support were so overwhelming that the series returned for another run culminating in a reboot and another five-issue series arc ending in January 2019. After his run with Marvel had ended, Grace posted an essay outlining his experiences working for Marvel on his personal Tumblr account. Among the topics within the essay, Grace has stated that he felt a lack of support for LGBTQIA+ content and its creators, as well as turning a blind eye when the creator was attacked online for his work celebrating a major queer storyline.

Grace is currently working on several titles, including writing Jughead's Time Police for Archie Comics, co-writing Go Go Power Rangers for BOOM! Comics, and writing his own original series Ghosted in L.A. for BOOM! Comics.

== Bibliography ==
Skybound Comics

- The Walking Dead #79–102 (2010–2012), editor
- Invincible #70–92 (2010–2012), editor
- Super Dinosaur #1–10 (2010–2012), editor
- Witch Doctor #1–6 (2010–2012), editor
- Guarding The Globe #1–6 (2010–2012), editor
- Thief of Thieves #1–9 (2010–2012), editor

Image Comics

- Li’l Depressed Boy #1-21 (2011–Current), artist
- Not My Bag One-Shot (2012), writer and artist
- Burn The Orphanage (2013–2014), co-writer and artist
- Self Obsessed (2014), writer and artist
- Penny Dora and the Wishing Box #1-5 (2015), artist
- Nothing Lasts Forever (2017), writer and artist
- Getting It Together (2020–2021), co-writer and artist

DC Comics

- Superman: The Harvests of Youth (2023), writer and artist

Marvel Comics

- All New X-Men Annual (2015), writer
- Secret Wars Journal #4 (2015), writer
- Iceman #1–11 (2017–2018), writer
- The Merry X-Men Holiday Special (2018), writer
- Infinity Wars: Infinity Warps #2 (2018), writer
- Iceman (2018) #1–5 (2018–2019), writer

BOOM! Comics

- Mighty Morphin’ Power Rangers 25th Anniversary Special (2018) writer, artist
- Go-Go Power Rangers #21–Current (2019–Current), co-writer
- Ghosted in L.A. #1–Current (2019–Current), writer

IDW

- Jem and the Holograms IDW 20/20 One-Shot (2019), writer
- Jem and the Holograms: Dimensions #4 (2018), writer
- Read Only Memories #1-4 (2019–2020), writer
