= Dan Parent =

American comic book artist and writer

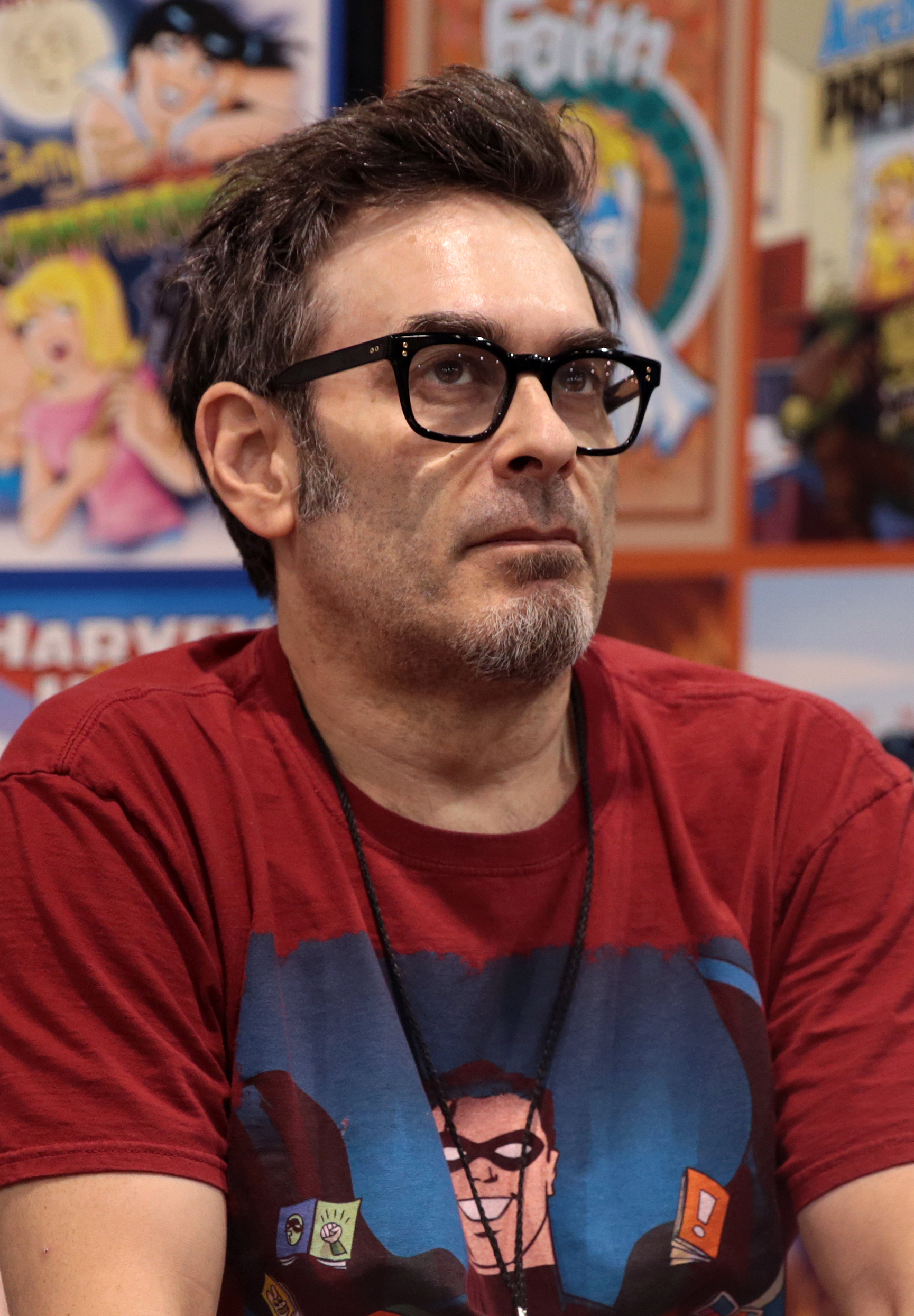
- Parent at the 2018 Phoenix Comic Fest
- Areas: Writer, Artist, Letterer

Dan Parent is an American comic book artist and writer best known for his work for Archie Comics. He has illustrated Love Showdown, Felix the Cat, Barbie, Disney Adventures, and with Fernando Ruiz, created the comic series Die Kitty Die.

== Biography ==
Dan Parent is an American comic book artist and writer who began working for Archie immediately after graduation from The Kubert School. His writing of the Love Showdown series from 1994 received widespread attention.

In 2010, Parent introduced the first openly gay character in Archie Comics when he created Kevin Keller in Veronica #202, which he wrote and drew. Kevin Keller got his own title with the publication of Kevin Keller #1 in 2012. In 2015, Parent illustrated the comic Archie vs. Sharknado, a tie-in to Sharknado 3: Oh Hell No! written by the film's director, Anthony C. Ferrante.

Parent, along with artist/writer Fernando Ruiz published Die Kitty Die in 2016, which was funded through Kickstarter.

Dan illustrated the 2018 6-part crossover "Archie Meets Batman '66". It was a joint publication between Archie Comics and DC Comics, and was collected in trade format in March 2019.

== Awards ==
In May 2013, Parent was presented with the GLAAD Media Award for Outstanding Comic Book in San Francisco.

Parent was nominated for a 2013 Harvey Award for Special Award for Humor in Comics.
