= Kyle Higgins =

American comic book writer and film director

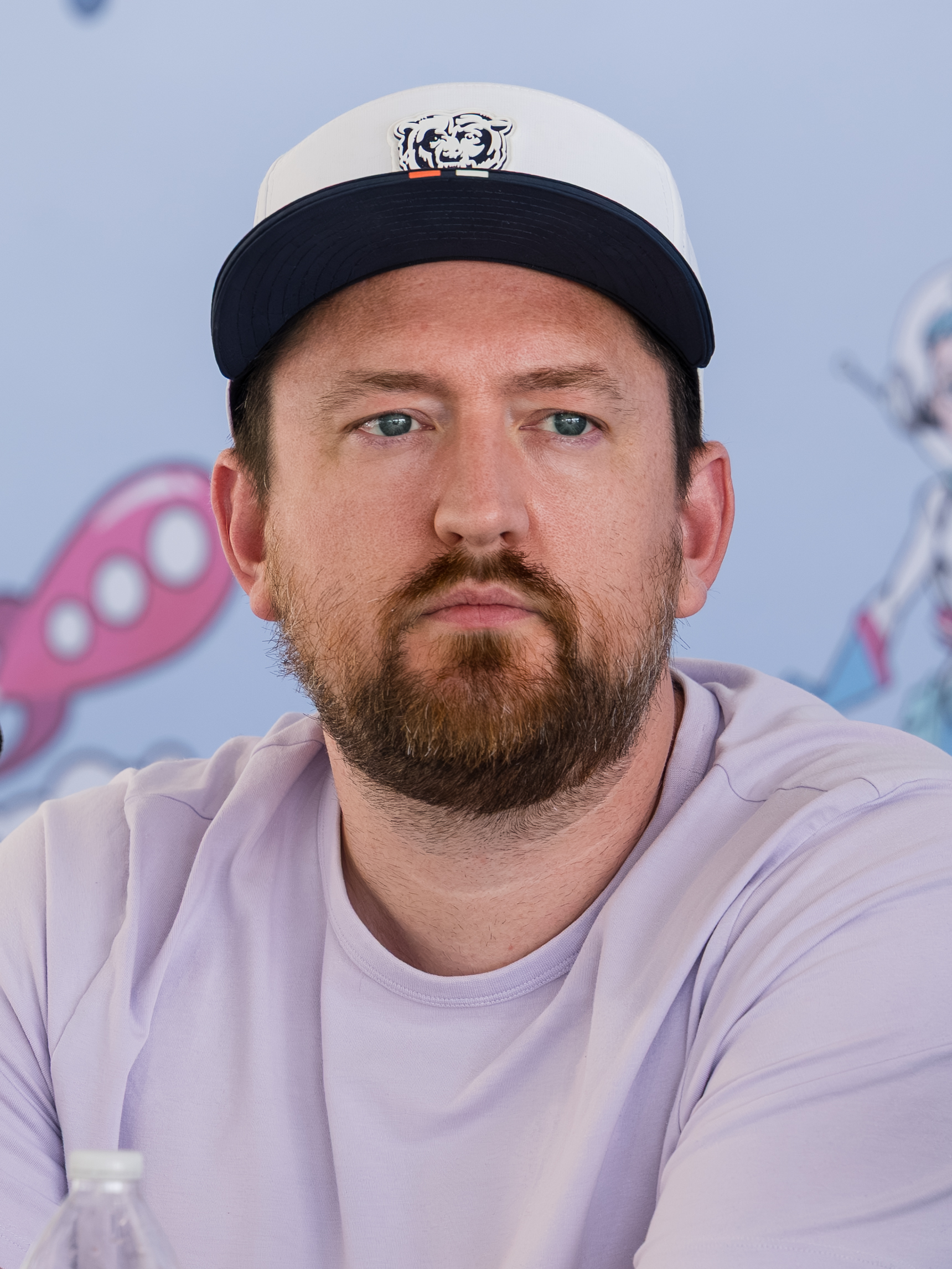
- Higgins at GalaxyCon Nashville in 2026
- Born: June 12, 1985 (age 41) Lockport, Illinois, U.S.
- Areas: Writer, director
- Notable works: Batman: Gates of Gotham; Nightwing; Power Rangers; C.O.W.L. Radiant Black; No/One

Kyle Higgins (born June 12, 1985) is an American comic book writer and film director. He is best known for his work on the Batman franchise at DC Comics, namely writing the miniseries Batman: Gates of Gotham and for the Nightwing and Batman Beyond titles, the Mighty Morphin Power Rangers franchise at Boom! Studios, and Radiant Black at Image Comics.

He is also the creator of the Massive-Verse shared universe of comic book titles published through Image Comics, for which he writes C.O.W.L., Radiant Black, and No/One.

== Early life ==
Kyle Higgins was born June 12, 1985, and grew up in Homer Glen, Illinois. At the age of seven, Higgins saw the 1978 feature film Superman, which began his passion for both comic books and filmmaking.

After two years of studying film and creative writing at the University of Iowa, Higgins transferred to the film production program of Chapman University in Orange, California, from which he would graduate. In late 2006, he began an unpaid internship with the Donners' Company, which provided him with the opportunity to work with Richard Donner, who directed the film that introduced Higgins to comics and filmmaking.

== Career ==
After writing and directing his college thesis film titled The League, about the superhero labor union of 1960's Chicago, Higgins spent a year writing for Marvel Comics before authoring the back-up features for the 2010 editions of Detective Comics Annual and Batman Annual. The stories introduced the Franco-Islamic character Nightrunner, who he co-created with David Hine and caused some controversy. Higgins stayed on the Batman brand, co-writing the five-issue Batman: Gates of Gotham with Detective Comics scribe Scott Snyder which delved into the history of Gotham City.

When DC rebooted their entire line in 2011 with The New 52, Higgins wrote Nightwing, often interlinking arcs with Snyder, who moved to Batman. Higgins also wrote the first eight issues of Deathstroke in September 2011. Higgins began writing Batman Beyond 2.0, a DCU version of the character from the DCAU animated series Batman Beyond, for DC's digital-first line. In January 2014, it was announced that Higgins had joined the writing team for Batman Eternal following his work on Nightwing, which ended in March 2014.

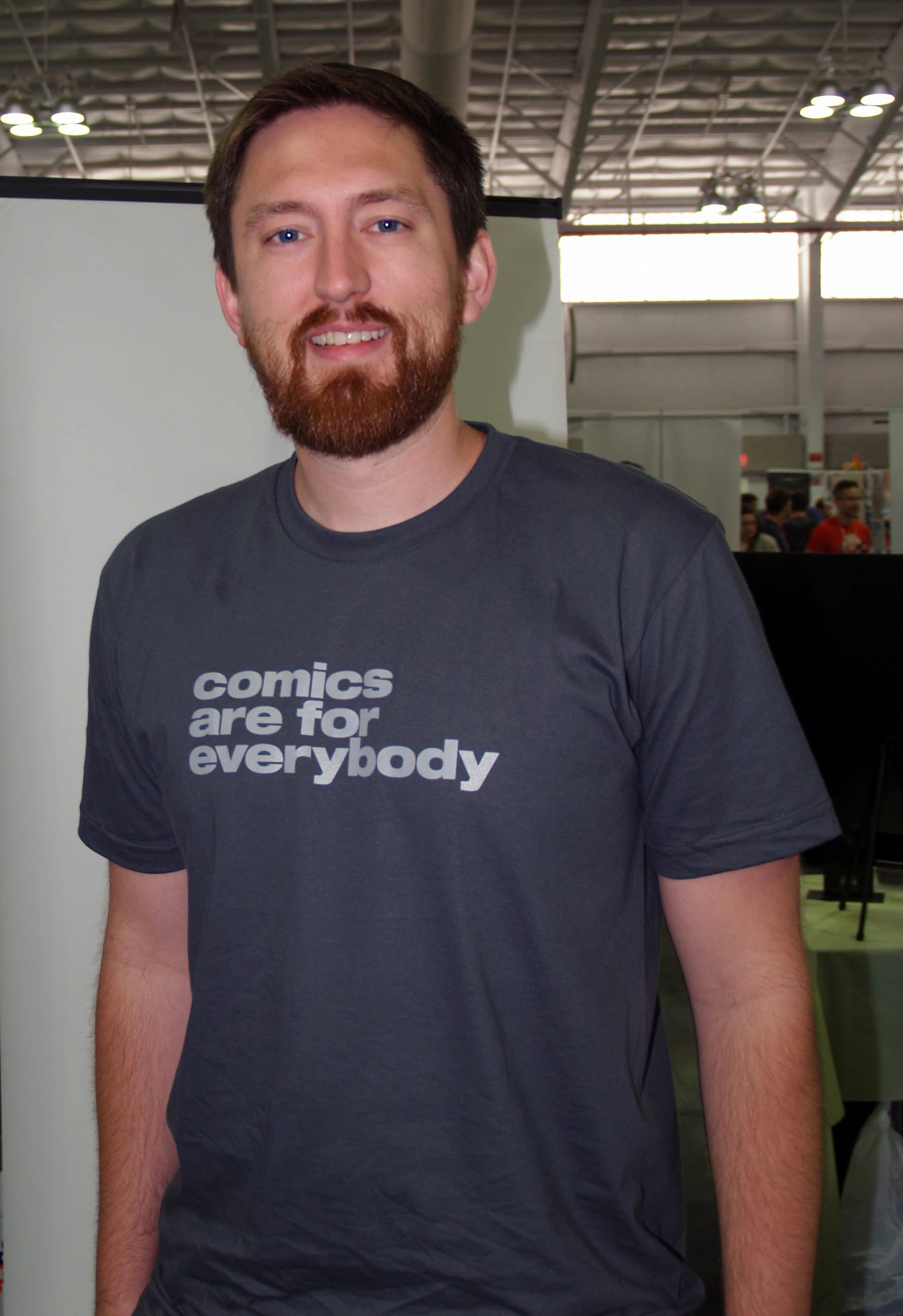
Higgins at Special Edition NYC in Manhattan in 2014

In January 2014, Higgins announced C.O.W.L., his first creator-owned ongoing series with Image Comics. The series, co-written by Alec Siegel and featuring art by Rod Reis, revisited the world created by Higgins in The League. C.O.W.L. explored superheroes from the lens of union organization, and featured an early-1960s aesthetic, noir overtones, and political drama. The series debuted in May 2014, and its first issue sold out of its initial print run. The series concluded in July 2015, with issue 11. Announced at Image Expo 2015, their next collaboration was the eight-issue sci-fi murder mystery Hadrian's Wall, which debuted in September 2016, which he will direct the film adaptation for the Gunpowder & Sky sci-fi label Dust.

In late 2015, Higgins was announced as the writer of Mighty Morphin' Power Rangers, an ongoing comic based on the show of the same name for Boom! Studios. Issue 9 of the comic introduced "the first new official Mighty Morphin Power Ranger created in over 20 years", Lord Drakkon. The character's popularity soon led to inclusion in mobile fighting game Power Rangers: Legacy Wars, an exclusive action figure, and other merchandise. Beginning in March 2018, Higgins wrote the first Power Rangers comic book event in "Shattered Grid", incorporating a range of characters from across the show's history, to celebrate the franchise's 25th anniversary. Higgins later wrote the story for the video game Power Rangers: Battle for the Grid, also acting as the game's voice director and providing the voice of the Mastodon Sentry. He would later be replaced as head writer of the comic by Marguerite Bennett, Ryan Parrott and Melissa Flores.

Higgins' next short film, The Shadow Hours, premiered in August 2016. Starring Tom Riley and Britt Lower, the award-winning neo-noir follows twin private investigators born with a mysterious medical condition where only one of them can be awake at a time.

In March 2017, Dynamite Entertainment announced a reboot of the Magnus, Robot Fighter franchise, written by Higgins with art by Jorge Fornés. Although released to strong reviews, the series was ultimately cancelled at issue 5. Higgins also reunited with his Gates of Gotham collaborator Trevor McCarthy for Nightwing: The New Order, an Elseworlds-style miniseries set in an alternate universe in which superpowers have been eliminated and outlawed. Despite initial fan criticism of the premise, the series was ultimately well-received, with many reviewers comparing the book positively to Marvel's concurrent Secret Empire event.

In early 2018, Higgins announced The Dead Hand, a creator-owned series for Image Comics with art by Stephen Mooney. A spy comic about a Cold War secret that returns to threaten the world, the series debuted in April 2018.

In March 2020, it was announced that Higgins and Mat Groom would be writing a new Ultraman series, titled The Rise of Ultraman, with art by Michael Cho, Francesco Manna. The series began publication on September 9, 2020. Later that year, it was announced that a sequel, The Trials of Ultraman, would begin publication in March 2021, with Higgins and Groom returning as writers and Manna returning as artist. A third series, The Mystery of Ultraseven, was announced to begin publication in August 2022, with Higgins and Groom returning as writers and Davide Tinto serving as the artist.

In November 2020, it was announced that Higgins was writing another creator-owned book for Image Comics entitled Radiant Black, with art by Marcelo Costa. The series officially began publication in February 2021. The series would grow so popular, that it would expand into its own universe of books dubbed "The Massive-Verse". It all started with a one-shot crossover entitled Supermassive, written by Higgins, Ryan Parrott, and Mat Groom with art by Francesco Manna and Simone Ragazzoni. The comic served as a crossover between Radiant Black, Inferno Girl Red, and Rogue Sun, with the comic marking the first appearances of the latter two. The first of these new books to spawn out of this would be the title Rogue Sun written by Parrott and drawn by Abel, with its first issue releasing on March 2, 2022. The first official spin-off of Radiant Black would release on March 9, 2022, entitled Radiant Red, with the miniseries written by Cherish Chen and art by David Lafuente.

In April 2021, it was announced that Higgins would be writing Ordinary Gods for Image with Felipe Wantanabe providing artwork. The series began publication in July 2021. In August 2021, it was announced that Joe Clark, music composer and long time friend of Higgins, would be joining as a permanent co-writer starting with issue 4.

In May 2021, it was announced that Higgins would write a miniseries on Darkhawk for Marvel, with Juanan Ramirez serving as artist. The first issue debuted on August 25, 2021, with the fifth and final issue releasing on January 12, 2022.

In July 2024, it was announced that Higgins was set to make his feature-length directorial debut with I Am No/One, a film adaption of the comic series No/One co-written and co-created by Higgins. He is also set to co-write the screenplay with No/One co-writer and co-creator Brain Buccellato, with the film set to be both a recap of the comic series and its companion podcast, Who is No/One?, while also serving as the final chapter in this multi-narrative experience.

In January 2025, it was announced that Higgins would reunite with Mat Groom for the 5-issue miniseries Spider-Verse vs. Venomverse, with Luciano Vecchio providing the art and the first issue set to release May 14th that same year. In April 2025, it was announced that Higgins and Groom would be writing a title for DC's Elseworlds imprint entitled Immortal Legend Batman. The series, which features character designs, covers, and back-ups by Dan Mora, would feature Erica D'Urso and Igor Monti on art and colors respectively and is set to release August 27th that same year.

== Bibliography ==
=== Marvel Comics ===
- Captain America Theater of War: Prisoners of Duty (one-shot) (with Alec Siegel and Agustín Padilla, December 2009) collected in America First (hc, 128 pages, 2010, ISBN 0-7851-3906-0)
- Captain America #616, "Crossfire", (with Alec Siegel and Pepe Larraz, March 2011) collected in Prisoner of War (hc, 200 pages, 2012, ISBN 978-0-7851-5122-7)
- Supreme Power vol. 2 (4-issue limited series with Manuel García, June 2011 - September 2011, collected in Gods and Soldiers, tpb, 96 pages, 2011, ISBN 0-7851-5571-6)
- Avengers Origins: Vision (one-shot, with Alec Siegel and Stephane Perger, November 2011) collected in Avengers: Mythos (tpb, 208 pages, 2012, ISBN 0-7851-4860-4)
- Death of Wolverine: The Logan Legacy #3 (with Jonathan Marks, October 2014) collected in Death of Wolverine: The Logan Legacy (tpb, 160 pages, 2015, ISBN 0-7851-9259-X)
- Winter Soldier #1-5 (with Rod Reis, December 2018-April 2019) collected in Winter Soldier: Second Chances (tpb, 112 pages, 2019 ISBN 978-1302915872)
- The Rise Of Ultraman #1-5 (5-issue limited series with Mat Groom, September 2020 - January 2021)
- The Trials of Ultraman #1-5 (5 issued limited series with Matt Groom, March 2021 - May 2021, July–August 2021)
- Darkhawk #1-5 (5 issued limited series with Juan Ramierez, July 2021 - January 2022)

=== DC Comics ===
- Detective Comics Annual #12, "The Night Runner" (with Trevor McCarthy, December 2010)
- Batman Annual #28, "Nightrunner" (with Trevor McCarthy, December 2010)
- Batman: Gates of Gotham (miniseries) (May 2011 - September 2011)
  - Batman: Gates of Gotham (tpb, 144 pages, 2012, ISBN 1-4012-3341-4) collects:
    - "Part One: A Bridge to the Past" (with Scott Snyder and Trevor McCarthy, in #1, 2011)
    - "Part Two: The Four Families of Gotham" (with Scott Snyder and Trevor McCarthy, in #2, 2011)
    - "Part Three: The Key to the City" (with Scott Snyder and Trevor McCarthy, in #3, 2011)
    - "Part Four: The Gotham City Massacre" (with Scott Snyder and Dustin Nguyen, in #4, 2011)
    - "Part Five: Welcome to the Future" (with Scott Snyder, Trevor McCarthy and Graham Nolan, in #5, 2011)
- Deathstroke vol. 2 (September 2011 - April 2012)
  - Volume 1: Legacy (tpb, 192 pages, 2012, ISBN 1-4012-3481-X) collects:
    - "Back To Basics" (with Joe Bennett, in #1, 2011)
    - "The Carpocalypse" (with Joe Bennett, in #2, 2011)
    - "Legacy" (with Joe Bennett, in #3, 2011)
    - "Time's Up" (with Joe Bennett, in #4, 2011)
    - "Blowback" (with Joe Bennett, in #5, 2012)
    - "Achilles Heel" (with Joe Bennett and Eduardo Pansica, in #6, 2012)
    - "Deadly Reunions" (with Joe Bennett, in #7, 2012)
    - "Circle of Life" (with Eduardo Pansica, in #8, 2012)
- Nightwing vol. 3 (September 2011-May 2014)
  - Volume 1: Traps and Trapezes (tpb, 160 pages, 2012, ISBN 1-4012-3705-3) collects:
    - "Welcome to Gotham" (with Eddy Barrows, in #1, 2011)
    - "Haly's Wish" (with Eddy Barrows, in #2, 2011)
    - "Past and Present" (with Eddy Barrows and Eduardo Pansica, in #3, 2011)
    - "South Beach Connection" (with Trevor McCarthy, in #4, 2011)
    - "'Til Death Do Us Part" (with Eddy Barrows, in #5, 2012)
    - "Good Girl Gone Bad" (with Eddy Barrows and Geraldo Borges, in #6, 2012)
    - "Turning Points" (with Eddy Barrows and Geraldo Borges, in #7, 2012)
  - Volume 2: Night of the Owls (tpb, 144 pages, 2013, ISBN 1-4012-4027-5) collects:
    - "Bloodlines" (with Eddy Barrows, in #8, 2012)
    - "The Gray Son" (with Eddy Barrows and Andres Guinaldo, in #9, 2012)
    - "The Tomorrow People" (with Eddy Barros and Geraldo Borges, in #10, 2012)
    - "Tomorrow Can't Wait" (with Andres Guinaldo, in #11, 2012)
    - "Inside Out" (with Andres Guinaldo, in #12, 2012)
    - "Perpetual Motion" (with Tom DeFalco and Eddy Barrows, in #0, 2012)
  - Volume 3: Death of the Family (tpb, 176 pages, 2013, ISBN 1-4012-4413-0) collects:
    - "The Hunter" (written by Tom DeFalco and drawn by Andres Guinaldo, in #13, 2012)
    - "Die For Me" (written by Tom DeFalco and drawn by Andres Guinaldo, in #14, 2012)
    - "Cleaning House" (with Eddy Barrows, in #15, 2012)
    - "Curtain Call" (with Eddy Barrows, in #16, 2013)
    - "The Punchline" (written by Scott Snyder and drawn by Greg Capullo, in Batman vol. 2 #17, 2013)
    - "Another Saturday Night" (with Sanford Greene, in Young Romance: A New 52 Valentine's Day Special #1, 2013
    - "The Long Week" (with Juan Jose Ryp, in #17, 2013)
    - "Slow Burn" (with Juan Jose Ryp, in #18, 2013)
  - Volume 4: Second City (tpb, 144 pages, 2014, ISBN 1-4012-4630-3) collects:
    - "Second City" (with Brett Booth, in #19, 2013)
    - "Flying Blind" (with Brett Booth, in #20, 2013)
    - "Co$t of Living" (with Brett Booth, in #21, 2013)
    - "Showtime" (with Will Conrad, in #22, 2013)
    - "World Turned Upside Down" (with Will Conrad, in #23, 2013)
    - "Buyer's Remorse" (with Will Conrad, in #24, 2013)
  - Volume 5: Setting Son (tpb, 200 pages, 2014, ISBN 1-4012-5011-4) collects:
    - "Embers" (with Jason Masters, in Anual #1, 2013)
    - "One Dark City Night" (with Will Conrad, in #25, 2013)
    - "Some Strings Attached" (with Will Conrad, in #26, 2013)
    - "Curiouser and Curiouser" (with Will Conrad, in #27, 2014)
    - "Butterfly Effects" (with Russell Dauterman, in #28, 2014)
    - "Safety Net" (with Russell Dauterman, in #29, 2014)
    - "Setting Son" (written by Tim Seeley and Tom King and drawn by Mikel Janín, Javier Garrón and Jorge Lucas, in #30, 2014)
- Masters of the Universe vol. 2 #2, #5 (with Pop Mhan and Mike Henderson, July 2012)
- Batman Beyond 2.0 (October 2013 - November 2014)
  - Rewired (tpb, 176 pages, 2014, ISBN 1-4012-5060-2) collects:
    - "Rewired" (with Thony Silas, in #1-8, 2013)
    - "The Bat-Men" (with Thony Silas, in #9-15, 2013–2014)
    - "Reunion" (with Eric Wight, in #16, 2014)
  - Justice Lords Beyond (tpb, 176 pages, 2015, ISBN 1-4012-5464-0) collects:
    - "Justice Lords Beyond: Another World" (with Thony Silas, in #17-24, 2014)
- Secret Origins vol.3 #1, "The Long Year" (with Doug Mahnke, April 2014) collected in Volume 1 (tpb, 160 pages, 2015, ISBN 1-4012-5049-1)
- Batman Eternal #22-39 (September 2014 – 2015)
  - Volume 2 (tpb, 448 pages, 2015, ISBN 1-4012-5231-1) collects:
    - "Succession Plans" (with Scott Snyder, James Tynion IV, Ray Fawkes, Tim Seeley and Jorge Lucas, in #22, 2014)
    - "Lioness" (with Scott Snyder, James Tynion IV, Ray Fawkes, Tim Seeley and Dustin Nguyen, in #23, 2014)
    - "The Spoiler" (with Scott Snyder, James Tynion IV, Ray Fawkes, Tim Seeley and Andy Clark, in #24, 2014)
    - "City of Whispers" (with Scott Snyder, James Tynion IV, Ray Fawkes, Tim Seeley and R.M. Guera, in #25, 2014)
    - "Broken Mirrors" (with Scott Snyder, James Tynion IV, Ray Fawkes, Tim Seeley, R.M. Guera and Juan Ferreyra, in #26, 2014)
    - "Divided" (with Scott Snyder, James Tynion IV, Ray Fawkes, Tim Seeley and Javier Garrón, in #27, 2014)
    - "Letting Go" (with Scott Snyder, James Tynion IV, Ray Fawkes, Tim Seeley and Meghan Hetrick, in #28, 2014)
    - "The City of Shadow and Doubt" (with Scott Snyder, James Tynion IV, Ray Fawkes, Tim Seeley and Simon Coleb, in #29, 2014)
    - "From On High" (with Scott Snyder, James Tynion IV, Ray Fawkes, Tim Seeley and Fernando Pasarin, in #30, 2014)
    - "Buried Deep" (with Scott Snyder, James Tynion IV, Ray Fawkes, Tim Seeley and Fernando Pasarin, in #31, 2014)
    - "Whisper Campaign" (with Scott Snyder, James Tynion IV, Ray Fawkes, Tim Seeley and Jason Fabok, in #32, 2014)
    - "Contents Under Pressure" (with Scott Snyder, James Tynion IV, Ray Fawkes, Tim Seeley and Jason Fabok, in #33, 2014)
    - "State of Truth" (with Scott Snyder, James Tynion IV, Ray Fawkes, Tim Seeley and Álvaro Martínez, in #34, 2014)

=== Image Comics ===
- C.O.W.L. (May 2014 - July 2015)
  - Volume 1: Principles of Power (tpb, 128 pages, 2014, ISBN 1-63215-111-1) collects:
    - "Motivation" (with Alec Siegel and Rod Reis, in #1, 2014)
    - "Self-Deception" (with Alec Siegel and Rod Reis, in #2, 2014)
    - "Perception" (with Alec Siegel and Rod Reis, in #3, 2014)
    - "Unity" (with Alec Siegel and Rod Reis, in #4, 2014)
    - "Sacrifice" (with Alec Siegel and Rod Reis, in #5, 2014)
    - "The Grey Raven Soars in "Raven's First Flight!"" (with Alec Siegel, Rod Reis and Joe Bennett, in #6, 2014)
  - Volume 2: The Greater Good (tpb, 128 pages, 2015, ISBN 1-63215-326-2) collects:
    - "At the Brink" (with Alec Siegel and Rod Reis, in #7, 2014)
    - "Doppler Shift" (with Alec Siegel and Rod Reis, in #8, 2015)
    - "The High Ground" (with Alec Siegel and Rod Reis, in #9, 2015)
    - "Full Disclosure" (with Alec Siegel and Rod Reis, in #10, 2015)
    - "Coming to Terms" (with Alec Siegel and Rod Reis, in #11, 2015)
- Radiant Black (February 2021 – present)
  - Volume 1: (Not So) Secret Origin (tpb, 184 pages, 2021, ISBN 978-1534319165) collects:
    - "(Not So) Secret Origin" (with Marcelo Costa, in #1, 2021)
    - "Better Off Red" (with Marcelo Costa, in #2, 2021)
    - "Writing Day" (with Marcelo Costa, in #3, 2021)
    - "Everything Changes" (with Marcelo Costa, in #4, 2021)
    - "Aftermath" (with Eduardo Ferigato and Marcelo Costa, in #5, 2021)
    - "Red" (with Cherish Chen and David Lafuente, in #6, 2021)
  - Volume 2: Team Up (tpb, 176 pages, 2022, ISBN 978-1534321090) collects:
    - "Radiant(s)" (with Marcelo Costa, in #7, 2021)
    - "<001>" (with Marcelo Costa, in #8, 2021)
    - "Life and Times" (with Eduardo Ferigato, in #9, 2021)
    - "Existence" (with Marcelo Costa, in #10, 2021)
    - "Awake" (with Joe Clark and Marcelo Costa, in #11, 2021)
    - "Pink" (with Meghan Camarena and French Carlomango, in #12, 2022)
  - Volume 3: Rogues Gallery (tpb, 192 pages, 2022, ISBN 978-1534323285) collects
    - "Accel" (with Marcelo Costa, in #13, 2022)
    - "Retaliation" (with Marcelo Costa & Eduardo Ferigato, in #14, 2022)
    - "Unauthorized" (with Alec Siegel, Eduardo Ferigato & Marcelo Costa, in #15, 2022)
    - "Ambush" (with Joe Clark and Marcelo Costa, in #16, 2022)
    - "Return" (with Joe Clark and Marcelo Costa, in #17, 2022)
    - "Yellow" (with Laurence Holmes and Stefano Simeone, in #18, 2022)
- Ordinary Gods (July 2021 – May 2023)
- Supermassive (February 2022) (With Ryan Parrott, Mat Groom, Francesco Manna, and Simone Ragazzoni)
- No/One (March 2023 – present) (with Brian Buccelleto, Geraldo Borges, and Mark Englert)
- Supermassive (May 2023) (With Ryan Parrott, Melissa Flores, Mat Groom, Daniele Di Nicuolo, Walter Baiamonte)

Preceded by Marv Wolfman	Deathstroke writer 2011−2012	Succeeded by Rob Liefeld
Preceded by Peter Tomasi	Nightwing writer 2011−2014	Succeeded by Tim Seeley and Tom King
Preceded by Adam Beechen	Batman Beyond writer 2013−2014	Succeeded by Dan Jurgens
