= Gotham City =

Fictional city, home of Batman

- Batman location
- Gotham City as illustrated by John Timms in Batman #107 (April 2021)
- First appearance: Batman #4 (December 1940)
- Created by: Bill Finger (writer); Bob Kane (artist)
- Genre: Superhero

In-universe information
- Type: City
- Locations: Ace Chemicals; Arkham Asylum; Blackgate Penitentiary; Gotham City Police Department; Iceberg Lounge; Wayne Enterprises; Wayne Manor
- Character: List: Aaron Cash; Ace the Bat-Hound; Alan Scott; Alberto Falcone; Alexis Kaye/Punchline; Alfred Pennyworth; Amadeus Arkham; Arnold Wesker/The Ventriloquist & Scarface; Arthur Brown/Cluemaster; Bane; Barbara Gordon/Batgirl; Basil Karlo/Clayface; Bruce Wayne/Batman; Bud and Lou; Carmine Falcone; Chuck Brown/Kite-Man; Damian Wayne/Robin; Dick Grayson/Nightwing; Duke Thomas/Signal; Drury Walker/Killer Moth; Edward Nygma/The Riddler; Floyd Lawton/Deadshot; Francine Langstrom; Garfield Lynns/Firefly; Gillian B. Loeb; Hamilton Hill; Harleen Quinzel/Harley Quinn; Harvey Bullock; Harvey Dent/Two-Face; Hugo Strange; Humphry Dumpler/Humpty Dumpty; Jack Ryder/The Creeper; Jason Todd/Red Hood; Jean-Paul Valley/Azrael; Jervis Tetch/Mad Hatter; Jim Gordon; Jonathan Crane/Scarecrow; Julian Day/Calendar Man; Julie Madison; Kirk Langstrom/Man-Bat; Lazlo Valentin/Professor Pyg; Lonnie Machin/Anarky; Lucius Fox; Mario Falcone; Martha Wayne; Maxie Zeus; Nora Fries; Oswald Cobblepot/The Penguin; Otis Flannegan/The Ratcatcher; Pamela Isley/Poison Ivy; Penelope Young; Prometheus; Ra's al Ghul; Renee Montoya; Roman Sionis/Black Mask; Sal Maroni; Selina Kyle/Catwoman; Slade Wilson/Deathstroke; Sofia Falcone; Solomon Grundy; Stephanie Brown/Spoiler; Talia al Ghul; Terry McGinnis; The Joker; Thomas Blake/Catman; Thomas Elliot/Hush; Thomas Wayne; Tim Drake/Red Robin; Vicki Vale; Victor Fries/Mr. Freeze; Victor Zsasz; Warren White/The Great White Shark; Waylon Jones/Killer Croc
- Publisher: DC Comics

Gotham City (/ˈɡɒθəm/ GOTH-əm), or simply Gotham, is a fictional city in the Northeastern United States that serves as the primary urban setting in American comic books published by DC Comics. It is best known as the home of the superhero Batman and his allies and foes. Created by writer Bill Finger and artist Bob Kane, Gotham was first identified as Batman's place of residence in Batman #4 (December 1940) and has since been the primary setting for stories featuring the character. While affluent, civic-minded families like the Waynes strive to rebuild Gotham City, it remains traditionally depicted as a crime-ridden dystopia, utterly consumed by institutional corruption, predatory mob syndicates, and erratic lunatics.

Gotham City is traditionally depicted as being located in the U.S. state of New Jersey. (Note: Attributed to multiple references:) Its look and atmosphere were primarily influenced by New York City, but over the years have drawn inspiration from Chicago and London as well. Architect Hugh Ferriss' designs also influenced the look and emotional feel of Gotham, particularly in its later depictions. Bill Finger said that he chose the name "Gotham", and not New York, so that readers in any city could identify with it.

Locations used as inspiration or filming locations for Gotham in the live-action Batman films and television series include Chicago, Detroit, Glasgow, Hong Kong, Liverpool, London, Los Angeles, Jersey City, Newark, New York City, Pittsburgh, Tokyo, and St. Louis. (Note: Attributed to multiple references:)

== Origin of name ==
In Jim Steranko's History of the Comics, writer Bill Finger said, "Originally I was going to call Gotham City 'Civic City.' Then I tried 'Capital City,' then 'Coast City.' Then I flipped through the New York City phone book and spotted the name 'Gotham Jewelers' and said, 'That's it,' Gotham City. We didn't call it New York because we wanted anybody in any city to identify with it."

"Gotham" is a nickname for New York City that first became popular in the 19th century. Washington Irving had first attached the name to New York in the November 11, 1807, edition of Salmagundi, a periodical which lampooned New York culture and politics. Irving took the name from the English village of Gotham, Nottinghamshire, which was known for the Wise Men of Gotham legend, in which the village's residents feigned idiocy to prevent a royal visit from John, King of England.

== Geography and history ==
A map showing Gotham City in the U.S. state of New Jersey from Amazing World of DC Comics #14 (March 1977). Art by Dick Dillin.

Gotham City, like other cities in the DC Universe, has varied in its depictions over the decades, but its location is traditionally depicted as being in the state of New Jersey. (Note: Attributed to multiple references:) Gotham and Metropolis are sometimes portrayed as twin cities on opposite sides of the Delaware Bay, with Gotham in New Jersey and Metropolis in Delaware. (Note: Attributed to multiple references:)

Gotham City is described as being founded in 1635 by Jon Logerquist, a Norwegian mercenary, before being taken over by the English; this history parallels the history of New York City, which was founded by the Dutch as New Amsterdam before being conquered by England and renamed New York. In Rick Veitch's comic Swamp Thing #85 featuring the character Tomahawk, Gotham is described as being the site of a major battle between American and British forces during the American Revolutionary War, which is a reference to the real-life Battle of Long Island. In the comic, Gotham is also rumored to be a site of occult rites.

The 2011 comic series Batman: Gates of Gotham details a history of Gotham in which Alan Wayne (Bruce Wayne's ancestor), Theodore Cobblepot (Oswald Cobblepot's ancestor), and Edward Elliot (Thomas Elliot's ancestor) are considered the founding fathers of Gotham. In 1881, they constructed three bridges called the Gates of Gotham, each bearing one of their last names. Edward Elliot became increasingly jealous of the Wayne family's popularity and wealth during this period; his jealousy would spread to his great-great-grandson Thomas Elliot, also known as Hush.

The occult origins of Gotham are further explored in Peter Milligan's 1990 story arc "Dark Knight, Dark City", which depicts some of the Founding Fathers of the United States being involved in summoning a bat-demon which becomes trapped beneath old "Gotham Town", its dark influence spreading as Gotham City evolves. A similar premise is found in 2005's Shadowpact #5 by Bill Willingham, which describes a being who has slept for 40,000 years beneath the land upon which Gotham was built. Strega, the being's servant, says that the "dark and often cursed character" of the city was influenced by the being who now uses the name "Doctor Gotham". In Gotham Underground #2 by Frank Tieri, Tobias Whale claims that 19th century Gotham was run by five rival gangs, until the first "masks" appeared, eventually forming a gang of their own. It is not made clear whether these were vigilantes or costumed criminals.

Gotham City in 1881 from Batman: Gates of Gotham (April 2011). Art by Trevor McCarthy.

Many storylines have added more events to Gotham's history, at the same time greatly affecting the city and its people. Perhaps the greatest in effect was a long set of serial storylines, which started with Ra's al Ghul releasing a debilitating virus called the "Clench" during the "Contagion" storyline. As that arc concluded, the city was beginning to recover, only to suffer an earthquake measuring 7.6 on the Richter scale in the 1998 "Cataclysm" storyline. This resulted in the federal government cutting Gotham off from the rest of the United States in the 1999 storyline "No Man's Land", the city's remaining residents forced to engage in gang warfare, either as active participants or paying for protection from groups ranging from the GCPD to the Penguin, just to stay alive. Eventually, Gotham was rebuilt and returned to the U.S. as part of a campaign mounted by Lex Luthor, who used the positive publicity of his role to make a successful bid for the position of President of the United States. Suggestions of other Gotham City histories include a founding date of 1820 seen in a city seal in Batman: Return of the Caped Crusaders, and a 200th anniversary of the city being celebrated in Tim Burton's Batman, either of which would make Maine the most likely state to contain Gotham City.

== Culture ==
Batman writer and editor Dennis O'Neil has said that, figuratively, Batman's Gotham City is akin to "Manhattan below 14th Street at eleven minutes past midnight on the coldest night in November". Batman artist Neal Adams has long believed that Chicago has been the basis for Gotham, stating "one of the things about Chicago is Chicago has alleys (which are virtually nonexistent in New York). Back alleys, that's where Batman fights all the bad guys." The statement "Metropolis is New York by day; Gotham City is New York by night" has been variously attributed to comics creators Frank Miller and John Byrne.

Airships are commonly depicted flying over Gotham City. Art by Jim Lee.

In designing Batman: The Animated Series, creators Bruce Timm and Eric Radomski emulated the Tim Burton films' "otherworldly timelessness", incorporating period features such as black-and-white title cards, police airships (although no such thing existed, Timm has stated that he found it to fit the show's style), and a "vintage" color scheme with film noir flourishes. Police airships have since been incorporated into Batman comic books and are a recurring element in Gotham City.

Concerning the evolution of Gotham throughout the years, former Batman editor Paul Levitz has stated, "Each guy adds their own vision. That's the fun of comics, rebuilding a city each time".

=== Architecture ===
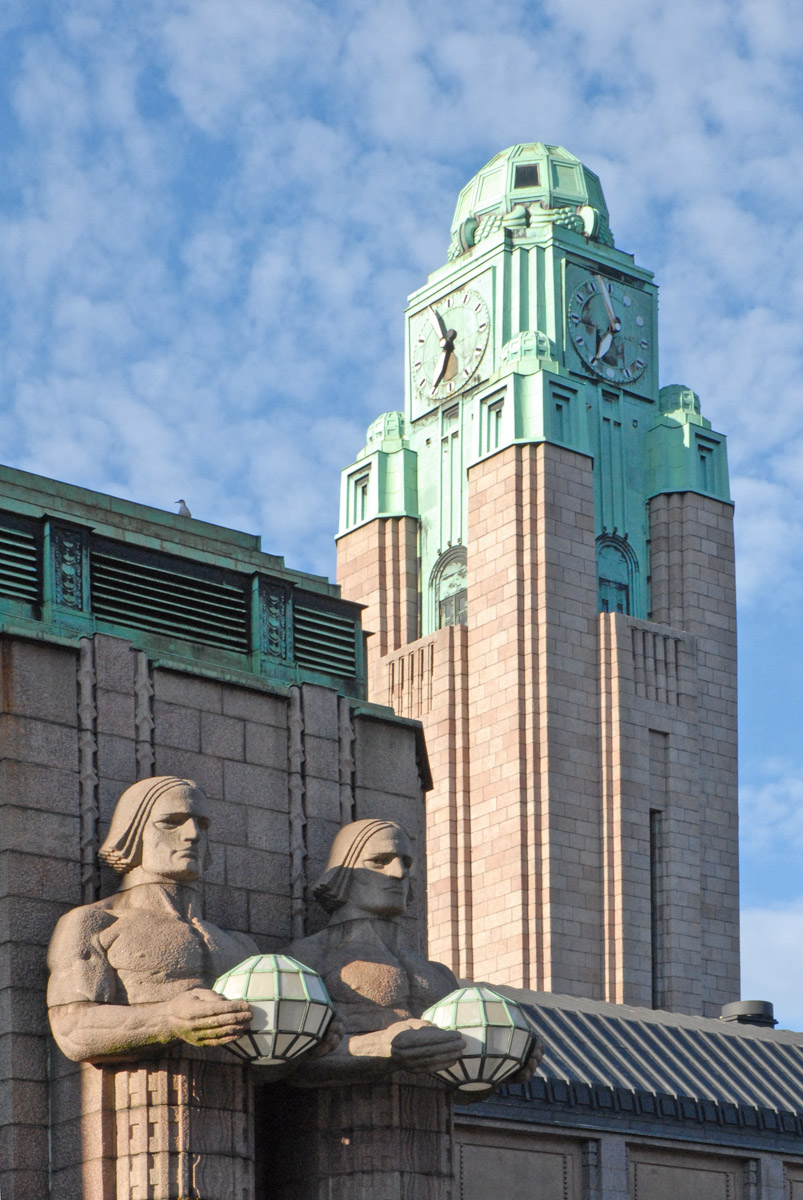
Art Deco and Art Nouveau buildings, such as Helsinki Central Railway Station, inspired the look of Gotham in the 1989 film Batman.

In Batman: Gothic, Gotham Cathedral plays a central role in the story since it is built by Mr. Whisper, the story's antagonist.

In a 1992 storyline, a man obsessed with Pinkney's architecture destroys several Gotham buildings to reveal the Pinkney structures they had hidden; the editorial purpose behind this was to make Gotham resemble its depiction in the 1989 Batman film.

Batman Begins features a CGI-augmented version of Chicago while The Dark Knight more directly features Chicago infrastructure and architecture such as Navy Pier. The Dark Knight Rises forgoes Chicago, instead shooting in Pittsburgh; Los Angeles; New York City; Newark, New Jersey; London; and Glasgow. (Note: Attributed to multiple references:)

== Notable residents ==
Batman enlists the help of numerous characters—including his sidekick, Robin—in the various Batman-related comics in the DC Comics continuity (multiple characters have been given the title "Robin", including Nightwing, Red Hood, Red Robin, Spoiler and Batman's son Damian Wayne). In addition to the Robins or former Robins, there is Catwoman, Batgirl (Barbara Gordon), Batgirl (Cassandra Cain), Signal, Batwing, Batwoman, and Huntress.

Batman overlooks Gotham, his home city. Art by Alex Ross.

Other DC characters have also been depicted living in Gotham, including Hitman, Jason Blood, Alan Scott, Jim Corrigan, Black Canary, Starman, and the Grey Ghost.

Apart from Gotham's superhero residents, the residents of the city feature in a back-up series in Detective Comics called Tales of Gotham City and in two limited series called Gotham Nights. The Gotham City Police Department is the focus of the series Gotham Central, as well as the mini-series Gordon's Law, Bullock's Law, and Batman: GCPD.

=== Mayors ===
The first Gotham mayor depicted in comics was in Detective Comics #68 (October 1942). Theodore Cobblepot, great-grandfather of the Penguin, was mayor in the late 19th century. Mayor Aubrey James was a contemporary of Thomas Wayne who was stabbed to death.

Hamilton Hill became mayor through the backing of crime boss Rupert Thorne but was ultimately ousted from office and replaced by George Skowcroft. Marion Grange later became mayor with the backing of Bruce Wayne, but was assassinated while trying to secure federal aid for Gotham after an earthquake. Sebastian Hady was a corrupt mayor who was eventually killed by the League of Shadows. Michael Akins, former commissioner of police, was appointed mayor, and later replaced by a man named Atkins. Following the storyline "The Joker War", anti-vigilante candidate Christopher Nakano wins election in a landslide.

== In other media ==
=== Television ===
In multiple episodes of the 1960s live-action Batman television series, Batman is seen consulting a transparent map of Gotham, which is an inverted map of St. Louis.

The live-action TV series Gotham was filmed in New York City and was an important requirement of the show's creative team. According to executive producer Danny Cannon, its atmosphere was inspired by the look of New York in the 1970s films of Sidney Lumet and William Friedkin. Clues to this include signs showing phone numbers bearing the area code 212. Donal Logue, who portrayed Harvey Bullock, described different aspects of that series' design of Gotham City as exhibiting different sensibilities, explaining, "for me, you can step into things that almost feel like the roaring 20s, and then there's this other really kind of heavy Blade Runner vibe floating around. There are elements of it that are completely contemporary and there are pieces of it that are very old-fashioned ... There were a couple of examples of modern technology, but maybe an antiquated version of it, that gave me a little bit of sense that it's certainly not the 50s and the 60s ... But it's not high tech and it's not futuristic, by any means."

In Young Justice, Gotham is implied to be located in Connecticut, near Bridgeport.

The 2019 series Batwoman, which is set in Gotham City, was filmed in Chicago.

The 2024 series The Penguin is set in Gotham City.

==== DC Animated Universe ====
Gotham City is featured heavily in Batman: The Animated Series. When describing Gotham City Paul Dini, a writer and director of the show, stated, "In my mind, it was sort of like what if the 1939 World's Fair had gone on another 60 years or so". In the episode "Joker's Favor", a driver's license lists a Gotham area resident's hometown as "Gotham Estates, NY". In the episode "Avatar", when Bruce Wayne leaves for England, a map shows Gotham City, at the joining of Long Island and the Hudson River. The episode "Fire from Olympus" shows a character's address in a police file indicating that Gotham City is located in New York state. The episode "The Mechanic", however, implies that Gotham is located in a state called Gotham; a prison workshop is shown stamping license plates that read "Gotham: The Dark Deco State" (as a reference to the artistic style of the series). The episode "Harlequinade" states that Gotham has a population of approximately 10 million.

Batman Beyond (1999–2001) envisions a Gotham City in 2039, referred to as Neo-Gotham.

==== Arrowverse ====
Gotham City was first shown in the Arrowverse as part of "Elseworlds", a 2018 crossover storyline among the shows, which introduced Batwoman, although it had been referred to several times previously.

In The Flash episode "Marathon", a map shows Gotham City in place of Chicago, Illinois.

==== Theme parks ====
Themed lands meant to represent Gotham City have been physically constructed in several different theme parks around the world. WB Movie World in Germany featured a Gotham City section that housed Batman Adventure – The Ride, and Six Flags Magic Mountain opened a section called the "Gotham City Backlot" that featured Batman: The Ride. The section featured at Magic Mountain was designed by park designer Kevin Barbee, and alongside the opening of Batman: The Ride coincided with the largest expansion the park had ever undergone in 23 years, with the theming elements primarily having been inspired by the Batman films directed by Tim Burton. Both the ride and the Gotham City Backlot opened on March 26, 1994.

The Magic Mountain section closed at the end of the park's 2010 season and was later rethemed and rebranded as the "DC Universe", featuring characters and attractions other than just Batman. It reopened in 2011.

Warner Bros. World Abu Dhabi features a section themed after Gotham City, including rides based on Batman, the Riddler and the Scarecrow as well as a walk-through attraction called "The Joker's Funhouse". The park and its Gotham City section were designed by Thinkwell Group. DC characters as they appear in both the attractions themselves as well as through live performers feature costumes based on The New 52 comic book relaunch from 2011. The Gotham City section neighbors another section themed after Metropolis, home of Superman.

=== Films ===
==== 1989 Batman series ====
Gotham City's skyline in the 1989 Batman film

Batman (1989) director Tim Burton wanted a timeless alternative to New York and described it as "hell burst through the pavement and grew". The look of Gotham was overseen by production designer Anton Furst, who won an Oscar for supervising the art department. Furst stated Batman was "definitely based in many ways on the worst aspects of New York City" and was inspired by Andreas Feininger's photographs of 1940s New York. Furst's draftsman Nigel Phelps created numerous charcoal drawings of the buildings and interior sets for the production.

Following the death of Furst, Burton tapped Bo Welch to oversee production design for Batman Returns (1992). Burton wanted Welch to re-imagine Gotham, stating "Batman didn't feel big to me – it didn't have the power an old American city has". Welch wanted to expand on the same basic concept for the sequel but moved away from European influences to show more American Art Deco/World's Fair elements. When asked what inspired his interpretation of Gotham, Welch stated "[H]ow can I create a visual expression of corruption and greed? That got me thinking about the fascistic architecture employed at world's fairs ... That feels corrupt because it's evocative of oppressive bureaucracies and dictatorships ... So I looked at a lot of [Third Reich] art and images from world's fairs". To physically make the city seem darker, he designed tall "oppressively overbuilt" cityscape that physically blocked out light.

When Joel Schumacher took over directing the Batman film series from Tim Burton, Barbara Ling handled the production design for both of Schumacher's films, Batman Forever (1995) and 1997's Batman & Robin. Ling's vision of Gotham City was a luminous and outlandish evocation of modern Expressionism and Constructivism. Its futuristic design, which Washington Post critic Desson Howe felt evoked the 1982 film Blade Runner, was described by Ling in her book, Bigger, Bolder, Brighter: The Production Design of Batman & Robin, as a cross between 1930s Manhattan and the "Neo-Tokyo" of Akira. Ling cited "neon-ridden" Tokyo and the Machine Age as her influences, describing her Gotham as "like a World's Fair on ecstasy". When Batman is pursuing Two-Face in Batman Forever, the chase ends at Lady Gotham, the fictional equivalent of the Statue of Liberty. During Mr. Freeze's attempt to freeze Gotham in the film Batman & Robin, the targeting screen for his giant laser locates it somewhere on the New England shoreline, possibly as far north as Maine. The soundtrack for Batman & Robin features a song named after the city and sung by R. Kelly, later included on international editions of his 1998 double album R.

==== The Dark Knight trilogy ====
Director Christopher Nolan has stated that Chicago inspired his portrayal of Gotham, and the majority of both Batman Begins (2005) and The Dark Knight (2008) were filmed there. However, Nolan's Gotham City was deliberately set in New Jersey to honor Gotham's location in the comic books.

For Batman Begins, Nolan desired that Gotham appear as a large, modern city that nonetheless reflects a variety of architectural styles and periods, as well as different socioeconomic strata. The production's approach depicted Gotham as an exaggeration of New York City, with elements taken from Chicago, the elevated freeways and monorails of Tokyo, and the "walled city of Kalhoon" [sic] in Hong Kong, which was the basis for the slum in the film known as The Narrows.

In The Dark Knight, more Chicago and New York influences were observed. On filming in Chicago, James McAllister, key location manager stated, "visually it's that look like you would see in the comic books". Nolan also stated "there's all these different boroughs, with rivers to interconnect. I think it's hard to get away from that, because Gotham is based on New York."

For The Dark Knight Rises (2012), the production utilized Pittsburgh; Los Angeles; New York City; Newark, New Jersey; London; Glasgow; and Toronto for shots of Gotham City. (Note: Attributed to multiple references:)

==== DC Extended Universe ====
Within the DC Extended Universe, Gotham City is located in Gotham County, New Jersey. In Batman v Superman: Dawn of Justice, paperwork mentions that the city is in Gotham County, and Amanda Waller's files on Deadshot and Harley Quinn in Suicide Squad reveal Gotham City to be located in the state of New Jersey. Zack Snyder confirmed that Metropolis and Gotham City are in geographical proximity to each other. The Boston Globe compared the proximity of Gotham City and Metropolis to Jersey City and Manhattan. A television ad for Turkish Airlines that premiered during the 2016 Super Bowl featured Bruce Wayne (Ben Affleck) promoting Gotham as a tourist destination.

To create Gotham in Batman v Superman: Dawn of Justice, the creative team "decided to recreate and combine large sections of existing selected city sections and adapt the architecture and layout to fit Gotham's. Thousands of photographs were put through MPC's photogrammetry pipeline to create geometry and textures for each city section."

Birds of Prey, which takes place in Gotham, was shot entirely in Los Angeles. It was originally expected to be filmed in Atlanta and Savannah, Georgia, but the production received a tax credit from California, incentivizing the location change.

==== The Batman ====
The 2022 Matt Reeves film The Batman delves into the criminal underbelly of Gotham City through noir-style storytelling and highlights themes of corruption rampant within the city's government and police department. The film used London, Glasgow, Liverpool, and Chicago as filming locations for Gotham City, although it was modeled on New York City. A towering skyscraper similar to the Empire State Building looms over Gotham City with an emblazoned sign that reads "Gotham Empire". A busy, commercial intersection called "Gotham Square" is seen in several shots and resembles Times Square with its bright signs and giant digital screens. The film's concluding sequence, while filmed at London's O2 Arena, is called "Gotham Square Garden", taking its naming convention from New York's Madison Square Garden.

==== Joker (2019) and Joker: Folie à Deux (2024) ====
Joker director and producer Todd Phillips imagined Gotham as a "version of Gotham was the pre-'80s boom New York, or urban northeastern center, but not the iconic New York". When asked how he re-imagined the city, production designer Mark Friedberg stated, "our version of Gotham was what groomed him. It was both an appreciation for how severe things got in the city, but also for the world of possibility that lived in the version of that city." The film shot on location and used landmarks in New York City; Jersey City, New Jersey; and Newark, New Jersey. In Joker: Folie à Deux, Gotham is explicitly stated to be in New York State.

==== DC Universe ====
The 2026 film Clayface is set in Gotham and rather than showcasing gleaming towers or iconic skylines, the film focuses on the decaying, dark underbelly of Gotham.

==== Animated films ====
The Gotham City skyline in Batman: Gotham Knight (2008)

During the events of the direct-to-video film Batman & Mr. Freeze: SubZero (1998), a computer screen displaying Barbara Gordon's personal information refers to her location as "Gotham City, NY", and displays her area code as 212 – a Manhattan area code.

The 2008 direct-to-DVD film Batman: Gotham Knight shows Gotham as a large city with many skyscrapers and a bustling population.

=== Video games ===
Gotham City appears in several video games, including Batman Begins, DC Universe Online, Gotham Knights and Mortal Kombat vs. DC Universe. The city makes another appearance in a video game with Injustice: Gods Among Us, where the player can fight outside or inside Wayne Manor, on top of a building and in an alley. Other games that feature the city include the Lego Batman series, Lego Dimensions, Lego DC Super-Villains, and Rocksteady's Arkham franchise.

Gotham City in Batman: Arkham Knight (2015)

Gotham City appears as a location in the 2017 video game Fortnite Battle Royale as part of a crossover in commemoration of Batman's 80th anniversary. It was the fourth incarnation of the game's iconic Tilted Towers area. Players are able to use the Batglider after falling from a great height, as long as they remain in the confines of Gotham City. The location was removed on October 13, 2019, during the game's "The End" live event, in which it was sucked into a Black Hole along with the rest of the Fortnite Chapter 1 Island. The assets used for Gotham City, devoid of any Batman branding, are featured in Fortnite Creative under the name "Dark Tilted".

==== Batman: Arkham ====
Batman: Arkham Asylum (2009) opens with Batman driving Joker from Gotham City to Arkham Asylum. Joker also threatens to detonate bombs across Gotham. In Batman: Arkham City (2011), the slums of Old Gotham City (the northern island) were converted into Arkham City. Inside the prison walls, this part of Gotham contains various landmarks throughout the story, like Penguin's Iceberg Lounge, the Ace Chemicals Plant, the Sionis Steel Mill, the Old Gotham City Police Department building, and the Monarch Theatre with the Wayne murder scene in Crime Alley. Most of these locations have major events in the story. In Batman: Arkham Origins (2013), an earlier, younger version of the city can be seen than that of other games in the Batman: Arkham series. In addition to the northern island, this installment in the series lets players explore a new southern island, connected to the former by the Pioneer's Bridge. The setting of Batman: Arkham Knight (2015), Central Gotham City, is five times larger than Old Gotham. The novelization for Batman: Arkham Knight revealed that Crime Alley was renamed Wayne Way months after the "death" of Batman.
