= Massive-Verse =

Fictional shared universe by Kyle Higgins

- Promotional Poster by Eduardo Ferigato and Igor Monti
- Publisher: Black Market Narrative (Image Comics)
- Publication date: February 2021 – present
- Genre: Superhero
Title(s)
- C.O.W.L. (Chicago Organized Workers League)
- Radiant Black
- Rogue Sun
- The Dead Lucky
- Inferno Girl Red
- Radiant Red
- Radiant Pink
- No/One
- Main characters: Nathan Burnett / Radiant Black; Marshall Ward / Radiant Black; Dylan Siegel / Rogue Sun; Cassia Costa / Inferno Girl Red; Satomi Sone / Radiant Red; Eva Reyes / Radiant Pink; Wendell George / Radiant Yellow; Bibiana "Bibi" Lopez-Yang / The Dead Lucky; No/One

Creative team
- Writer: Various
- Artist: Various
- Colorist: Various
- Editor: Michael Busuttil

The Massive-Verse (M-V) is a fictional shared universe, created by Kyle Higgins, which spans a line of comic books (Radiant Black, Rogue Sun, Inferno Girl Red, The Dead Lucky, and other spin-offs) published by Image Comics since February 2021, later retroactively established to have begun with C.O.W.L. (Chicago Organized Workers League), first published in May 2014.

== Publication history ==
In November 2020, it was announced that Higgins was writing another creator-owned book for Image Comics entitled Radiant Black, with art by Marcelo Costa. The series officially began publication in February 2021.

The first crossover started with a one-shot crossover entitled Supermassive, written by Higgins, Ryan Parrott, and Mat Groom with art by Francesco Manna and Simone Ragazzoni and colors by Igor Monti released February 23, 2022. The comic served as a backdoor pilot for spin-off titles entitled Inferno Girl Red and Rogue Sun, with this comic marking the first appearances of the series' protagonists.

The first of these new books to spawn out of this would be the title Rogue Sun written by Parrott and illustrated by Abel, with its first issue releasing on March 2, 2022 and Inferno Girl Red debuting on January 25, 2023, written by Groom and illustrated by Erica D'Urso and colored by Monti. In February 2022, it was announced that another book connected to the Massive-Verse would release in August entitled The Dead Lucky, written by Melissa Flores and illustrated by French Carlomagno. The first direct spin-off of Radiant Black would release on March 9, 2022, entitled Radiant Red, with the miniseries written by Cherish Chen and art by David Lafuente. Another spin-off, Radiant Pink, written by Meghan Camarena and Melissa Flores and illustrated by Emma Kubert, debuted on December 7, 2022. C.O.W.L. (Chicago Organized Workers League) was originally released by Kyle Higgins in 2014 as a stand-alone work, but has since been retroactively designated as part of the Massive-Verse. In December 2022, it was announced that a new series, entitled No/One, would launch in March 2023, with Higgins and Brian Buccellato writing and Geraldo Borges illustrating.

A second Supermassive event was released in May 2023 written by Higgins, Parrot, Groom and Flores with artwork by Daniele Di Nicuolo. This one-shot features Radiant Black (Nathan and Marshall), Rogue Sun (Dylan) and The Dead Lucky (Bibiana), along with a new character Thomasin (a previous Inferno Girl Red) as they hunt down the Holy Grail. That issue includes a cameo from Medieval Spawn, hinting at a further crossover with the wider Image Universe in which the Massive-Verse is set down the line.

After the end of an official fan voting, and the "Catalyst War" arc, the next Radiant Black story arc will feature Marshall Ward as the permanent titular hero.

== Main characters ==
- Radiant Black (Nathan Burnett) — The original Radiant Black, before a building collapsed on top of him that left him in a coma for 9 months. He eventually became Radiant Black again and is now sharing the Radiant with Marshall. Has the ability to manipulate gravity and shoot energy blasts.
- Radiant Black (Marshall Ward) — Nathan's best friend and the second Radiant Black after Nathan fell into a coma. Has the ability to manipulate gravity and shoot energy blasts. Became the new permanent Radiant Black after winning a fan vote.
- Radiant Red (Satomi Sone) — An Asian-American woman with financial debt. Has the ability of matter-absorption.
- Radiant Pink (Eva Reyes) — An Hispanic internet streamer who has the ability to open portals.
- Radiant Yellow (Wendell George) — An elderly African-American man who has the ability to see every probability across time and space.
- Rogue Sun (Dylan Siegel) — The latest Rogue Sun following the death of his estranged father, Marcus Bell.
- Inferno Girl Red (Cassia Costa) — A teenage girl living in Apex City and the current Inferno Girl Red.
- The Dead Lucky (Bibiana "Bibi" Lopez-Yang) — The former captain of the platoon "Dead Lucky" and has the ability to control electrical machinery and can see energy ghosts.
- NO/ONE — A hacktivist/vigilante operating in Pittsburgh.
- Shift (Guy) — A recurring villain who antagonizes Radiant Black and leads his own crime syndicate that sells Radiant tech. Has the ability to "shift" between places.

== Titles ==
=== Ongoing series ===
| Title | Issues | Writer(s) | Artist(s) | Colorist(s) | Debut date | Finale date |
|---|---|---|---|---|---|---|
| Radiant Black | #1– | Kyle Higgins; Megan Camerena; Cherish Chen; Joe Clark; Laurence Holmes; Alec Siegel | Marcelo Costa; Ze Carlos; French Carlomagno; Thobias Daneluz; Eduardo Ferigato; David Lafuente; Stefano Simeone | Marcelo Costa; Raul Angulo; Tríona Farrell; Rod Fernandes; Mattia Iancono; Natália Marques; Igor Monti; Miquel Muerto (#6); Stefano Simeone | February 10, 2021 | Present |
| Rogue Sun | #1– | Ryan Parrott; Nic Cotton | Abel; Ze Carlos; Marco Renna | Chris O'Halloran; Natalia Marques; Raul Angulo | March 2, 2022 | Present |

=== Limited series ===
| Title | Issues | Writer(s) | Artist(s) | Colorist(s) | Debut date | Finale date |
|---|---|---|---|---|---|---|
| C.O.W.L. (Chicago Organized Workers League) | #1–11 | Kyle Higgins; Alec Sigel | Rod Reis; Elsa Charretier | Rod Reis | May 28, 2014 | July 12, 2015 |
| Radiant Red | #1–5 | Cherish Chen | David Lafuente | Miquel Muerto | March 9, 2022 | July 6, 2022 |
| The Dead Lucky | #1–12 | Melissa Flores | French Carlomagno | Mattia Iacono | August 3, 2022 | March 27, 2024 |
| Radiant Pink | #1–5 | Meghan Camarena; Melissa Flores | Emma Kubert | Rebecca Nalty | December 7, 2022 | May 24, 2023 |
| Inferno Girl Red Book One | #1–3 | Mat Groom | Erica D'Urso | Igor Monti | January 25, 2023 | March 22, 2023 |
| No/One | #1–10 | Kyle Higgins; Brian Buccellato | Geraldo Borges | Mark Englert | March 15, 2023 | July 24, 2024 |
| C.O.W.L. 1964 | #1–4 | Kyle Higgins; Alec Sigel | Rod Reis | | August 7, 2024 | TBD |
| Inferno Girl Red Book Two | #1–3 | Mat Groom | Erica D'Urso | Igor Monti | December 3, 2025 | February 4, 2026 |

=== One-shots ===
| Title | Writer(s) | Artist(s) | Colorist(s) | Debut date |
|---|---|---|---|---|
| Supermassive (2022) | Kyle Higgins; Ryan Parrott; Mat Groom | Francesco Manna; Simone Ragazzoni | Igor Monti | February 23, 2022 |
| Supermassive (2023) | Kyle Higgins; Ryan Parrott; Mat Groom; Melissa Flores | Daniele Di Nicuolo | Walter Baiamonte | May 24, 2023 |
| Shift (2023) | Kyle Higgins | Daniele Di Nicuolo; Francesco Manna; Danilo Beyruth; Geraldo Borges; Chris Evanhuis | Walter Baiamonte; Marcelo Costa; Mark Englert; Sjan Weijers | December 20, 2023 |
| Supermassive (2024) | Mat Groom Kyle Higgins; Ryan Parrott; Melissa Flores Joe Clark | Stefano Simeone | | July 24, 2024 |

=== Other ===
| Title | Writer(s) | Artist(s) | Colorist(s) | Debut date | Finale date |
|---|---|---|---|---|---|
| Shift (4 part story in Image!) | Kyle Higgins | Daniele Di Nicuolo; Francesco Manna; Danilo Beyruth; Geraldo Borges; Chris Evanhuis | Walter Baiamonte; Marcelo Costa; Francesco Segala; Gloria Martinelli; Sjan Weijers | April 13, 2022 | July 27, 2022 |

== Other media ==
=== Animated short film ===
In June 2022, to tie in with the release of Radiant Black #15, an animated short produced by Tiger Animation and Black Market Narrative entitled Versus | Radiant Black vs. Blaze was released, with Higgins directing and co-writing with Alec Siegel and Will Friedle providing the voice of Radiant Black. The short can be viewed on the official Black Market Narrative YouTube channel.

=== Podcast ===
In December 2022, it was announced that, to tie-in with the release of No/One, an in-universe podcast entitled Who Is No/One? would release with each issue and would feature the voice work of Rachael Leigh Cook as Julia Paige, the host of the podcast, and Patton Oswalt as Teddy Barstow, the Metro Editor for The Pittsburgh Ledger. Loren Lester provides the voice of No/One, while Yuri Lowenthal, Tara Platt, Cristina Vee, Karl Herlinger, Todd Stashwick, and Walter Jones are also cast. The podcast will also feature original art by Mark Englert and music by Kristopher Carter.

=== Audiobook ===
In April 2024, it was announced an audiobook adaptation of Radiant Black would release later that year. Rider Strong is set to play the voice of Nathan with Friedle reprising his role as Marshall from the animated short. Higgins will serve as writer, director, and narrator for the adaptation. Further casting was announced at San Diego Comic-Con 2024, including Kim Rhodes as Mrs. Burnett, Loren Lester as Mr. Burnett, Todd Stashwick as <001>, Melissa Navia as Eva Reyes / Radiant Pink, Anne Yatco as Satomi Sone / Radiant Red, Troy Baker as Guy / Shift, Ross Marquand as the Radiant Black Colossal, Damion Poitier as Officer Peters, Kevin Porter as Officer Mills, Kaiji Tang as Owen Fujimoto, and Phil Morris as Wendell George / Radiant Yellow.

=== Feature length film ===
In July 2024, during San Diego Comic-Con it was announced that a film based on the comic series No/One was officially in development, under the title I Am No/One. According to TheWrap, the film is set to consist of "sit down interviews, phone and drone footage, news coverage, and first-person GoPro and helmet videography from the "No/One" operation itself". Higgins is set to direct the film, along with co-writing the screenplay with No/One co-writer and co-creator Brian Buccellato. The film is set to be both a recap of the comic series and its companion podcast, Who is No/One?, while also serving as the final chapter in this multi-narrative experience.

== Collected editions ==
| Title | Collected material | Publication date | ISBN |
Radiant Black
| Radiant Black Vol. 1: (Not So) Secret Origin | Radiant Black #1–6 | August 18, 2021 | 978-1534319165 |
| Radiant Black Vol. 2: Team-Up | Radiant Black #7–12 | March 16, 2022 | 978-1534321090 |
| Radiant Black Vol. 3: Rogues' Gallery | Radiant Black #13–18 | October 19, 2022 | 978-1534323285 |
| Radiant Black Vol. 4: Two-In-One | Radiant Black #19–24 | July 12, 2023 | 978-1534324770 |
| Radiant Black Vol. 5: The Catalyst War Part 1: Crisis | Radiant Black #25 A & B, #26, #26.5, #27, and #27.5 | February 28, 2024 | 978-1534397255 |
| Radiant Black Vol. 6: The Catalyst War Part 2: Infinite Earths | Radiant Black #28, #28.5, #29, #29.5, #30, #30.5 and Supermassive (2024) | January 21, 2025 | 978-1534397248 |
| Radiant Black Vol. 7: All-New All-Different | Radiant Black #31-36 | September 9, 2025 | 978-1534332270 |
| Radiant Black Vol. 8: New Number One | Radiant Black #37-43 | August 4, 2026 | 978-1534332409 |
| Radiant Black Vol. 9: Civil War | Radiant Black #44-49 | May 25, 2027 | 978-1534334175 |
Radiant Red
| Radiant Red Vol. 1: Crime & Punishment | Radiant Black #6, Radiant Red #1–5 | December 7, 2022 | 978-1534323209 |
Radiant Pink
| Radiant Pink Vol. 1: Across the Universe | Radiant Black #12, Radiant Pink #1–5 | July 25, 2023 | 978-1534324862 |
Rogue Sun
| Rogue Sun Vol. 1: Cataclysm | Rogue Sun #1–6 | August 24, 2022 | 978-1534322370 |
| Rogue Sun Vol. 2: Hellbent | Rogue Sun #7–12 | May 17, 2023 | 978-1534324701 |
| Rogue Sun Vol. 3: Knight Sun | Rogue Sun #13–18 | March 26, 2024 | 978-1534397231 |
| Rogue Sun Vol. 4: Divinity | Rogue Sun #19–24 | March 4, 2025 | 978-1534327535 |
| Rogue Sun Vol. 5: Noxious | Rogue Sun #25-29 | September 23, 2025 | 978-1534332355 |
| Rogue Sun Vol. 6: Mr. Poe | Rogue Sun #30-35 | October 27, 2026 | 978-1534330214 |
The Dead Lucky
| The Dead Lucky Vol. 1: The Good Die Young | The Dead Lucky #1–6 | March 22, 2023 | 978-1534324664 |
| The Dead Lucky Vol. 2: We Didn't Start the Fire | The Dead Lucky #7–12 | June 4, 2024 | 978-1534397224 |
Inferno Girl Red
| Inferno Girl Red Book One | Inferno Girl Red #1–3 | June 13, 2023 | 978-1534324817 |
| Inferno Girl Red Book Two | Inferno Girl Red Book Two #1-3 | April 21, 2026 | 978-1534335080 |
No/One
| No/One Vol. 1 | No/One #1–10 | December 10, 2024 | 978-1534397217 |
Supermassive
| Supermassive Vol. 1 | Supermassive (2022), Supermassive (2023), Supermassive (2024) | April 23, 2025 | 978-1534333574 |
C.O.W.L. 1964
| C.O.W.L. 1964 | C.O.W.L. 1964 #1-4 | November 3, 2026 | 978-1534355972 |
