= Radiant Black =

American comic book series

- Cover of Radiant Black #1

Publication information
- Publisher: Image Comics
- Genre: Superhero
- Publication date: February 10, 2021–present
- No. of issues: 44 (8 Volumes & 2 chapters)
- Main characters: Nathan Burnett; Marshall Ward

Creative team
- Written by: Kyle Higgins; Meghan Camarena (#12); Cherish Chen (#6); Joe Clark (#11, #16-17, #25-42); Laurence Holmes (#18); Alec Siegel (#15)
- Artists: Marcelo Costa; French Carlomagno (#12); Eduardo Ferigato (#5, #9, #14-15, #25-30.5); David Lafuente (#6); Stefano Simeone (#18)
- Inkers: Jonas Trindade (#14); Paul Daniel Santos (#25)
- Letterers: Becca Carey; Diego Sanches (#16)
- Colorists: Marcelo Costa; Raul Angulo (#13, #21-23, #25-30.5); Tríona Tree Farrell (#16-17); Rod Fernandes (#4, #20, #25-30.5); Mattia Iancono (#11-12); Natália Marques (#5, #7-8); Igor Monti (#10, #14-15, #24); Miquel Muerto (#6); Stefano Simeone (#18)
- Editor: Michael Busuttil

Radiant Black is an American comic book series created by Kyle Higgins and Marcelo Costa. The ongoing series began publication by Image Comics on February 10, 2021. It is a part of Image's Massive-Verse, A collection of comic titles—Rogue Sun, The Dead Lucky, Inferno Girl Red, No/One, and others—take place within the same shared universe with stories and plot points often intersecting and crossing over between titles.

The series follows two best friends, Nathan and Marshall, who encounter a small black hole looking object that grants its wielder superpowers. As they slowly discover the object's extraterrestrial origins, they realize that its creators have come searching and will stop at nothing to retrieve it. Radiant Black is the flagship title of the Massive-Verse and has spun-off several other titles like Radiant Red and Radiant Pink.

== Synopsis ==
The series follows Nathan Burnett, a failing 30-year-old writer with a massive incurred credit-card debt, forced to move back to his hometown of Lockport, Illinois, to live with his parents, and Marshall Ward, Nathan's deadbeat lifelong best friend who works at a DVD rental store. One night, they both discover the cosmic Black Radiant, a small floating black-hole-like entity which bonds with Nathan and grants him a sleek high tech black and white full body suit, and gravity-based superpowers. Nathan becomes the superhero Radiant Black, starts using his abilities to help people and fight crime, and later encounters another radiant powered individual with different abilities who uses them to commit crime. After Nathan is injured in a confrontation with the other Radiant user that leaves him hospitalized and in a coma, Marshall takes over as Radiant Black for his best friend.

Marshall confronts the other Radiant powered individual responsible for his friends condition, but they are interrupted by a ruthless alien foe who plans to forcefully remove their Radiants at the cost of their lives. Their confrontation with the alien leads them to meeting up with the other two Radiant powered heroes revealing them to be four in number. They all later realize that the Radiants belong to powerful cosmic beings on their way to earth, beings who would stop at nothing to reclaim the Radiants.

== Characters ==
=== Main characters ===
- Nathan Burnett: is a failing writer living in Los Angeles, California. He works as a ride-share driver as a second job—struggling to secure a loan due to his massive credit card debt. This financial strain ultimately leads him to return to Lockport to live with his parents, and reunite with his lifelong best friend, Marshall. There, he and Marshall discover a small floating black hole that grants Nathan enhanced strength, speed and gravity based superpowers (flight, telekinesis, energy projection), which prompts him to become the superhero Radiant Black. Nathan would later become the new 001 beginning with issue 42.
- Marshall Ward: Nathan's superhero movie-loving best friend, and employee at The Reel World, a DVD rental shop. Marshall and Nathan attended the same High-School, Marshall has been shown to have a history of anger-prone outbursts and violence, but has always been caring and sardonic to his friends and would do anything to protect those he loves. After an incident with a fellow Radiant user puts Nathan out of commission, Marshall gains his best friends abilities and becomes the second Radiant Black while also struggling with facing his violent tendencies and proving to others that he has changed and developed self control. Following a fan vote at the end of issue 24 and the events of the Catalyst War storyline, Marshall became the permanent Radiant Black.
- Satomi Sone: An Asian-American middle school teacher who becomes Radiant Red, a radiant powered individual in a red and black full-body super-suit who can absorb matter and energy to bulk-up, drastically increasing in size, strength and durability. She initially used her abilities for crime causing the hospitalization of Nathan during their super powered encounter, but later atones for her crimes and helps protect the planet on various occasions. She later headlines her own five-issue miniseries titled Radiant Red.
- Eva Reyes: An energetic Gen Z internet gaming streamer who becomes Radiant Pink, a radiant powered superhero in a pink and black full-body super-suit with the ability to teleport great distances and massive objects and people. She later headlines her own five-issue miniseries titled Radiant Pink.
- Wendell George: He was an electrical engineer (with a PhD) working at a factory, then a BestBuy employee who became Radiant Yellow after finding the Yellow Black Hole in an abandoned donut shop. The powers of the Yellow Radiant allow him to see into the future, but are later revealed to be closer to time travel and timeline manipulation.
- 001: or Kor, is one of the first villains in Radiant Black. He is from an alien race of highly skilled and heavily armed technologically advanced warriors, originally loyal to the creators of the Radiants and hell-bent on forcing the Radiant heroes to return their Black Holes and powers to the Cosmic Beings that wish to reclaim them, to prevent the Catalyst War against Earth. He later helps Radiant Black and the others to stop the Catalyst War

=== Villains ===
- Guy/Shift: A recurring foe and leader of his own syndicate who has the ability to "shift" between places. He hunts down the Radiant heroes with alien technology from 001's ship which grant him his abilities. He intend to use the Radiants from the heroes to power and recharge he and his syndicate's technology.

== Development and publication history ==
Radiant Black is a creator-owned superhero series by writer Kyle Higgins and artist Marcelo Costa, launched by Image Comics in February 2021. Higgins (known for Power Rangers and Ultraman) conceived the book as a personal, "millennial" take on superheroes. He describes it as a "love letter to the superhero stories I love" designed for a "whole new generation". Costa notes the series mixes "superheroes and Sentai" (Japanese tokusatsu) – essentially blending Western heroics with Power Rangers–style action. Indeed, press compared Radiant Black to Power Rangers and Invincible, and even Spider-Man-style storytelling. Higgins has said the story filters real-world "generational issues" – debt, career struggles and second chances – through a superhero lens. The main creative team (writer Higgins, artist Costa, letterer Becca Carey and editor Michael Busuttil) remained largely intact for the series; one exception was Issue #6, which was co-written by Cherish Chen (with art by David Lafuente) to tell a guest character's origin.

Radiant Black debuted on February 10, 2021, as Image Comics' flagship of the new "Massive-Verse"—a shared superhero universe created by writer Kyle Higgins and artist Marcelo Costa. Over the next four years, it released 32 main issues on a roughly monthly schedule, punctuated by five ".5" or special one-shots (#0, #26.5, #27.5, #28.5, #29.5, and #30.5) that provided recaps, character spotlights, and bridges into crossover events. Its issues have been gathered into six trade paperbacks (Vol. 1 – Vol. 6) between August 2021 and January 2025, plus two deluxe hardcover "Massive Edition" omnibuses (Vol. 1 in October 2024; Vol. 2 forthcoming). In late 2024 the series tied into the Massive-Verse "Catalyst War" crossover: issues #30–30.5 formed a combined event, and Image even reprinted them as a double-sized special. A free recap issue—Radiant Black: The Story So Far, released in January, 2025, summarized the Catalyst War and set up the next "Rebuild" era of the franchise. As of mid-2025 the main series is ongoing (Image's site lists issue #35 for June 25, 2025 and #36 for July 30, 2025).

The series spun off three mini-series in 2022—Radiant Red: Crime & Punishment, Radiant Pink: Across the Universe, and the Supermassive crossover series, while participating in the Massive-Verse "Catalyst War" event across multiple titles like Rogue Sun, M-V: The Dead Lucky, M-V: Inferno Girl Red, and No/One. Digital singles remain available on ComiXology and Image's app, and translated editions have appeared in Italian (Oct 2024) with French and more on the way. In April 2025 issue #35 closed out Catalyst War and set the stage for the "Rebuild" era, with a #0 one-shot scheduled for July 2025 and further crossovers planned.

== Collected editions ==
Title	Collected material	Publication date	ISBN
Radiant Black Vol. 1: (Not So) Secret Origin	Radiant Black #1–6	August 18, 2021	978-1534319165
Radiant Black Vol. 2: Team Up	Radiant Black #7–12	March 16, 2022	978-1534321090
Radiant Black Vol. 3: Rogues Gallery	Radiant Black #13–18	October 19, 2022	978-1534323285
Radiant Black Vol. 4: Two-In-One	Radiant Black #19–24	July 18, 2023	978-1534324770
Radiant Black Vol. 5: Crisis	Radiant Black #25–27.5	February 28, 2024	978-1534397255
Radiant Black Vol. 6: Infinite Earths	Radiant Black #28–30.5, Supermassive 2024	January 1, 2025	978-1534397248
Radiant Black Vol. 7: All-New All-Different	Radiant Black #31–#36	August 27, 2025	978-1534332270
Radiant Black Vol. 8: New Number One	Radiant Black #37–#43	July 22, 2026	978-1534332409
Radiant Black: Massive Edition Book One HC	Radiant Black #1–12	October 23, 2024	978-1534327559
Radiant Black: Massive Edition Book Two HC	Radiant Black #13–24	March 11, 2026	978-1534335448

== Sales and reception ==
Daniel Gehen from Comics Bulletin wrote "Radiant Black #1 lays the foundation for what may be the best new superhero since Robert Kirkman's Invincible". Matthew Aguilar of ComicBook.com liked the main character.

The 32 released chapters of Radiant Black—including the 6 released volumes have gotten positive reviews from critics and users alike, holding a collective average critic rating of 8.7 out of 10 for 179 reviews, and an equal user rating of 8.7 out of 10 for 483 reviews on the review aggregator website—Comic Book Roundup.

At launch Radiant Black sold extremely well by independent-comics standards. Early orders for issue #1 broke the 70,000 mark at Diamond's Final Order Cutoff. Comichron's estimate is about 73,000 copies shipped by Diamond (making #1 among the top-seller independents that month). Image's publicity noted that #1 quickly went to a second printing, and #2 "sold out in a snap" and was also reprinted. Subsequent issues saw the common post-launch drop: Diamond figures show #2 at 38,800 and #3 at 32,900 copies sold in 2021. Sales then gradually tapered into the 20–30K range (e.g. issues #4–#6 were in the high 20Ks ). By late 2021 the monthly issues stabilized around the high teens with issue #9 at 18,120 copies, issue #10 at 17,090 copies, and issue #11 at 18,026 copies sold. Notably, by October 2024 the publisher again reported rush printings—an all-star #30/#30.5 special sold strongly.

Trade paperback sales have been modest. According to Diamond/Comichron tallies, Radiant Black Vol.1 (Not So Secret Origin, TPB) sold about 5,900 copies via comics shops in its first year, while Vol.2 (Team-Up) shipped roughly 3,000 copies in its debut month (March 2022). Later volumes have similar performance for a creator-owned indie. Digital editions of each issue and collection have been made widely available (on ComiXology, Kindle, Apple Books, etc.), though specific digital sales figures are not publicly released. Overall, Radiant Black became a standout hit for Image: it sold out multiple printings of its early issues and sustained respectable retailer orders throughout its run, fueled by both the creators' fanbase and buzz from events like the "Catalyst War."

=== Accolades ===
Year	Award	Category	Result	Ref.
2022	Eisner Award	Best New Series	Nominated	

=== Issues ===
#	Publication date	Comic Book Roundup rating	Estimated sales (first month)
1	February 10, 2021	8 by 23 professional critics.	—N/a
2	March 17, 2021	8.2 by 13 professional critics.	—N/a
3	April 21, 2021	8 by 9 professional critics.	—N/a
4	May 19, 2021	9 by 9 professional critics.	—N/a
5	June 16, 2021	9 by 9 professional critics.	22,358, ranked 132nd in North America
6	July 21, 2021	9.1 by 7 professional critics.	23,040, ranked 131st in North America
7	August 18, 2021	9.2 by 9 professional critics.	20,223, ranked 129th in North America
8	September 22, 2021	8.6 by 6 professional critics.	20,058, ranked 145th in North America
9	November 3, 2021	9.1 by 5 professional critics.	—N/a
10	November 24, 2021	8.8 by 4 professional critics.	—N/a
11	December 22, 2021	8.8 by 3 professional critics.	—N/a
12	February 9, 2022	8.4 by 5 professional critics.	—N/a
13	March 30, 2022	8.5 by 3 professional critics.	—N/a
14	May 4, 2022	8 by 5 professional critics.	—N/a
15	June 15, 2022	8.3 by 3 professional critics.	—N/a
16	July 27, 2022	8.6 by 4 professional critics.	—N/a
17	August 24, 2022	7.9 by 3 professional critics	—N/a
18	September 21, 2022	8.8 by 4 professional critics	—N/a
19	November 9, 2022	8.1 by 3 professional critics	—N/a
20	December 14, 2022	8.4 by 3 professional critics	—N/a
21	January 25, 2023	7.5 by 2 professional critics	—N/a
22	March 1, 2023	9.0 by 1 professional critic	—N/a
23	April 12, 2023	—N/a	—N/a
24	May 3, 2023	—N/a	—N/a
25	July 19, 2023	—N/a	—N/a
26	August 23, 2023	—N/a	—N/a
27	December 13, 2023	—N/a	—N/a
27.5	December 13, 2023		
28	February 28, 2024		
28.5	February 28, 2024		
29	July 3, 2024		
29.5	July 3, 2024		
30	October 16, 2024		
30.5	October 16, 2024		

== Spin-offs ==
On February 23, 2022, the first issue of the Massive-Verse superhero crossover event series titled Supermassive, written by Kyle Higgins & Ryan Parrott, and illustrated by Mat Groom & Francesco Manna aired. Starring Radiant Black along with the Image Comics debut of INFERNO GIRL RED and the first appearance of Rogue Sun and Dead Lucky. The title has since then seen a total of 3 releases—Supermassive (2022), (2023), and (2024).

A 5-issue miniseries spinoff titled Radiant Red: Crime & Punishment, written by Cherish Chen and Illustrated by David Lafuente & Miquelon Muerto, set in the same Massive-Verse as Radiant Black—following another radiant-powered hero named Satomi Shen—a middle school teacher who gains the ability to absorb matter from the red Radiant and initially uses it to commit crime, was announced and has completely aired, with the first issue released on May 9, 2022.

Another five-issue miniseries spin-off titled Radiant Pink: Across the Universe, written by Meghan Camarena and Melissa Flores, and illustrated by Emma Kubert, began publishing on December 7, 2022. It follows Eva—a video game streamer who gains the ability to teleport from the pink Radiant and is secretly the superhero Radiant Pink—using her alter ego to increase her stream views, which invites a squad of mercenaries hunting for the radiant that powers her.

== In other media ==
A one minute long animated trailer for the comic series featuring the original song "RADIANT" by Crisis Couture was released on January 8, 2021. An animated short film called "VERSUS" about a fight between the characters Radiant Black and Blaze of C.O.W.L. was released on YouTube on June 22, 2022 and a QR code to the video was hidden as an easter egg in Radiant Black #15. The film was written by Kyle Higgins and Alec Siegel, animated by Tiger Animation and featured the voices of Will Friedle as Radiant Black, Reginald James, Rick Cramer and David Sobolov.

In April 2024, it was announced an audiobook adaptation of Radiant Black would release later that year. Rider Strong is set to play the voice of Nathan with Friedle reprising his role as Marshall from the animated short. Higgins will serve as writer, director, and narrator for the adaptation. Further casting was announced at San Diego Comic-Con 2024, including Kim Rhodes as Mrs. Burnett, Loren Lester as Mr. Burnett, Todd Stashwick as <001>, Melissa Navia as Eva Reyes / Radiant Pink, Anne Yatco as Satomi Sone / Radiant Red, Troy Baker as Guy / Shift, Damion Poitier as the Radiant Black Colossal and Officer Peters, Kevin Porter as Officer Mills, Kaiji Tang as Owen Fujimoto, and Phil Morris as Wendell George / Radiant Yellow. Cherish Chen, who co-wrote issue 6 of Radiant Black and the Radiant Red miniseries, will also narrate alongside Higgins.
