= Radiant Pink: Across the Universe =

American comic book

- Date: December 7, 2022 – May 24, 2023
- Main characters: Eva Reyes / Radiant Pink
- Publisher: Image Comics

Creative team
- Writers: Meghan "Strawburry17" Camarena; Melissa Flores
- Artists: Emma Kubert; Kelly McMahon (variant cover)
- ISBN: 978-1-5343-2486-2

Chronology
- Preceded by: M-V: The Dead Lucky
- Followed by: M-V: Inferno Girl Red No/One

Radiant Pink: Across The Universe is a five-issue American comic book limited series written by Meghan "Strawburry17" Camarena and Melissa Flores–and illustrated by David Lafuente, published by Image Comics as the sixth installment of the fictional superhero universe the Massive-Verse (M-V), a direct spin-off of Radiant Black following Eva Reyes / Radiant Pink, a Hispanic internet streamer who has the ability to open portals. The series began publication on December 7, 2022, and concluded on May 24, 2023.

The series received a universally positive critical reception. It was followed by Inferno Girl Red Book One and No/One.

== Publication history ==
Radiant Pink: Across the Universe began publication on December 7, 2022, and concluded on May 24, 2023.

=== Issues ===
Issue	Publication date	Ref.
#1	December 7, 2022	
#2	January 4, 2023	
#3	February 22, 2023	
#4	April 5, 2023	
#5	May 24, 2023	

== Collected editions ==
Title	Material collected	Format	Pages	Released	ISBN
Radiant Pink: Across the Universe	Radiant Black #12 and Radiant Pink #1–5	TPB	160	July 25, 2023	ISBN 978-1-5343-2486-2

== Reception ==
Radiant Pink: Across the Universe received generally good reviews.
