= Radiant Red: Crime & Punishment =

American comic book

- Date: March 9 – July 6, 2022
- Main characters: Satomi Sone / Radiant Red
- Publisher: Image Comics

Creative team
- Writers: Cherish Chen
- Artists: David Lafuente
- Colorists: Miquel Muerto
- ISBN: 978-1-5343-2320-9

Chronology
- Preceded by: Radiant Black
- Followed by: M-V: The Dead Lucky Radiant Pink: Across the Universe

Radiant Red: Crime & Punishment is a five-issue American comic book limited series written by Cherish Chen–and illustrated by David Lafuente, published by Image Comics as the fourth instalment of the fictional superhero universe the Massive-Verse (M-V), a direct spin-off of Radiant Black, following Satomi Sone / Radiant Red, an Asian-American woman with financial debt and the ability of matter-absorption. The series began publication on March 9, 2022, and concluded on July 6 later that year.

The series received a universally positive critical reception, It was followed by M-V: The Dead Lucky and Radiant Pink: Across the Universe.

== Publication history ==
Radiant Red: Crime & Punishment began publication on March 9, 2022, and concluded on July 6, 2022.

=== Issues ===
Issue	Publication date	Ref.
#1	March 9, 2022	
#2	April 6, 2022	
#3	May 25, 2022	
#4	June 22, 2022	
#5	July 27, 2022	

== Collected editions ==
Title	Material collected	Format	Pages	Released	ISBN
Radiant Red: Crime & Punishment	Radiant Black #6 and Radiant Red #1–5	TPB	160	December 7, 2022	ISBN 978-1-5343-2320-9

== Reception ==
Radiant Red: Crime & Punishment received generally good reviews.
