= Fake Off =

- Genre: Reality television
- Created by: Chris Culvenor
- Presented by: Corbin Bleu
- Judges: Harry Shum, Jr. Laurieann Gibson; Casper Smart
- Country of origin: United States
- Original language: English
- No. of seasons: 4
- No. of episodes: 32

Production
- Executive producers: James Sunderland; Eden Gaha; Paul Franklin; Chris Culvenor

Original release
- Network: TruTV
- Release: October 27, 2014 – June 24, 2015

Fake Off is an American reality competition television series. The show features groups of performers who recreate and reimagine moments from pop culture (e.g. movies, events, television series) in spectacular 90-second routines. The teams use a diverse range of stage disciples including black light theatre, projection mapping, puppetry, and dance. The term "Faking" is used to describe the act of recreating an iconic moment. It debuted on TruTV on October 27, 2014, and is produced by Shine America. TruTV renewed the show for a second season, which was also its last.

== Summary ==
The knock-out performance competition is hosted by Robert Hoffman and judged by actor and dancer Harry Shum, Jr., Pop Star Rozonda Thomas and renowned choreographer Michael Curry. The series features ten teams of performers who each week are given a new pop-culture theme (such as action movies, reality television, the Moon landing, or the Olympic Games). Each team has one week to turn their theme into a 90-second Fake that is then scored by the three judges and the studio audience. The team whose Fake got the lowest score is eliminated from the competition. The Fakes consist of visually stunning special effects that are generated by the group through various stagecraft techniques. After eight episodes one team wins the title of America's Best Fakers and $100,000.

== Contestants ==
Team	Hometown		Result
Wilderbe	Los Angeles, CA	Interactive Videotaping Dance Group	Eliminated 1st 10th place
YFX	Detroit, MI	Theatrical Mime Illusion Group	Eliminated 2nd 9th place
Verses	Los Angeles, CA	Silhouette Dance Group	Eliminated 3rd 8th place
Kristef Strikes Back	Las Vegas, NV	Comedy Acrobatics Troupe	Eliminated 4th 7th place
Inspirati	Denver, CO	Shadow Dance Company	Eliminated 5th 6th place
Archedream	Philadelphia, PA	Blacklight Theater Group	Eliminated 6th 5th place
Freelusion USA	Los Angeles, CA; Budapest, Hungary	3D Videotape Dance Group	Fourth place 4th place
The Body Poets	San Diego, CA	Street Dance Crew	Third place 3rd place
PUSH Physical Theatre	Rochester, NY	Physical Theater Group	Runner-up; 2nd place (runners-up)
Lightwire Theater	New Orleans, LA	Luminous Puppet Theater Company	Winner; 1st place (winners)

== Competition summary ==
=== Season 1 ===
==== Week 1 ====
Running order

Contestant	Theme	Total Score	Result
The Body Poets	Video Game Revolution	24 + 7 = 31	Safe
Wilderbe	Titanic	29 + 9 = 38	Safe
Archedream	TV Drama	26 + 7 = 33	Safe
Inspirati	Children's Cartoons	26 + 9 = 35	Safe
PUSH Physical Theatre	The Super Bowl	26 + 9 = 35	Safe

==== Week 2 ====
Running order

Contestant	Theme	Total Score	Result
Freelusion USA	Western	22 + 8 = 30	Safe
Kristef Strikes Back	Horror Movies	26 + 9 = 35	Safe
Lightwire Theater	Local TV News	27 + 9 = 36	Safe
YFX	Sci-fi Movies	21 + 6 = 27	Safe
Verses	Movies	22 + 7 = 29	Safe

=== Season 2 ===
The judges are Harry Shum Jr., Laurieann Gibson, and Beau Casper Smart. The host is Corbin Bleu. Meghan Camarena is the backstage correspondent.

10 new teams competed in Season 2 (Academy of Villains, Astra Dance Theatre, ClownSnotBombs, CubeMetricks, The Deca Crew, JUNK, LUMA, On The Fly, The Surrealists, Tribe of Fools).

- Winners: Academy of Villains
- Runners-Up: Cubametricks
- 3rd Place: The Surrealists
- 4th Place: Tribe of Fools
- Eliminated: Astra Dance Theatre, LUMA, ClownSnotBombs, The Deca Crew, JUNK, On The Fly

==== Week 1 ====
The theme of the week was "Movie Night".

Team	Theme	Harry	Laurieann	Beau	Judges' Total	Audience	Total	Result
Academy of Villains	Horror Movies	8	8	9	25	10	35	Safe/Highest Score
Astra Dance Theatre	Fantasy Movies	8	8	7	23	8	31	Safe
CubeMetricks	Sci-Fi Movies	7	7	7	21	7	28	Safe
On The Fly	Kung Fu Movies	6	7	7	20	7	27	Safe
ClownSnotBombs	Silent Movies	6	8	5	19	7	26	Safe/Lowest Score

== Reception ==
The show received a positive reception from critics when it launched in October 2014. Allison Keene from The Hollywood Reporter wrote “TruTV has truly created a flashy and worthwhile series that is cut above current competition series, and far more exciting than yet another iteration of a singing show.” Pilot Viruet from Flavorwire wrote “I think Fake Off is my new favorite unscripted program, it was completely mesmerizing.”
