= Meghan Camarena =

American YouTube and television personality (born 1987)

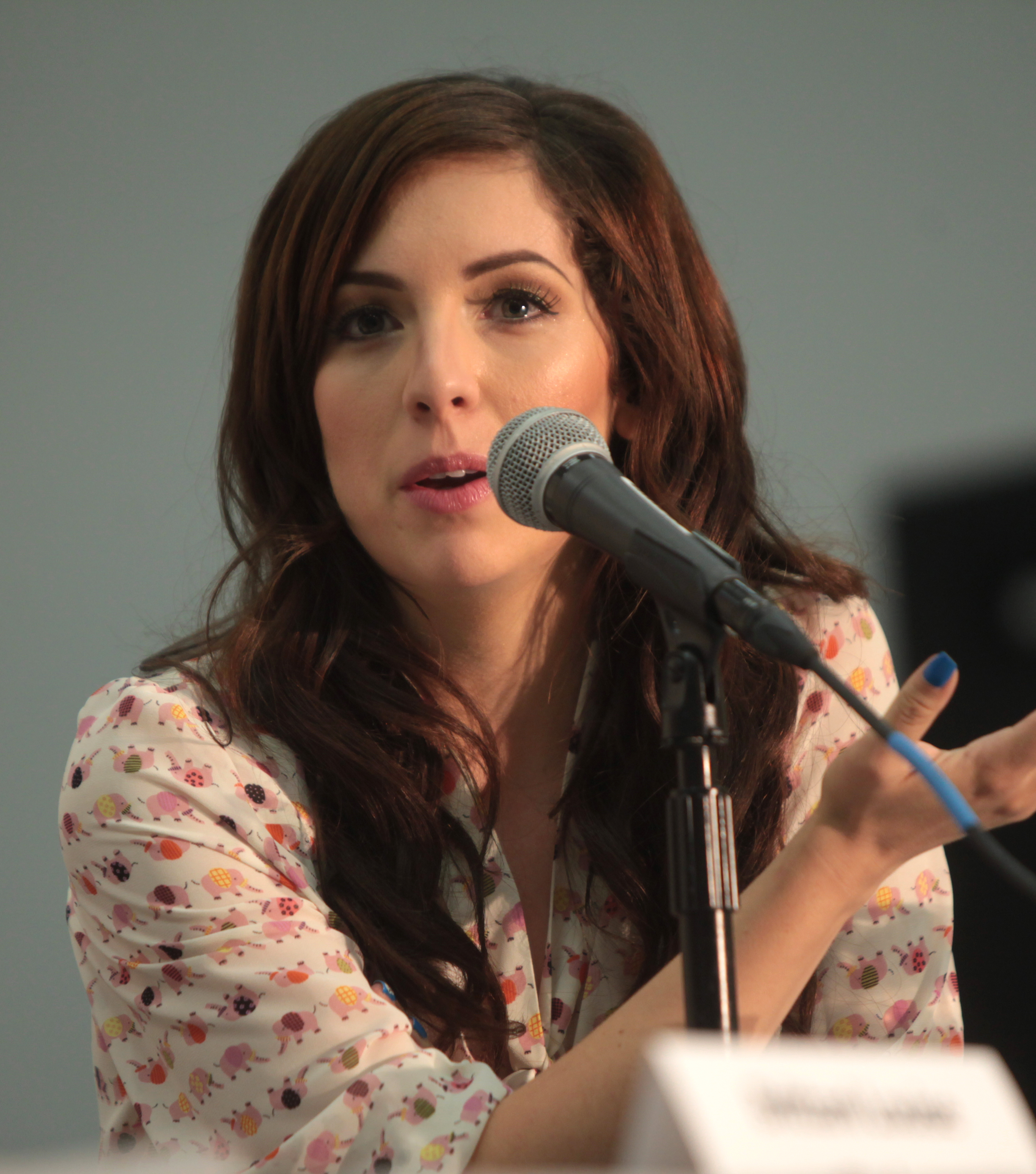
- Camarena at VidCon in 2014
- Born: Meghan Channing Camarena; July 17, 1987 (age 39); Fresno, California, U.S.
- Occupations: YouTube personality; television host; comic book writer; Twitch streamer
- Partner: Arryn Zech

YouTube information
- Channels: Strawburry17; Strawburry17Plays; LifeBurry
- Years active: 2007–present
- Subscribers: 961 thousand (main channel)
- Views: 145 million (main channel)
- Last updated: September 9, 2026

Meghan Channing Camarena (born July 17, 1987), known by her online pseudonym Strawburry17, is an American YouTube personality, television host, actress, and comic book writer. She has worked on a number of videos, web series, and films, gaining popularity as a YouTube star, and participating as a contestant with fellow YouTuber Joey Graceffa on The Amazing Race 22 and The Amazing Race: All-Stars. She was an on-screen host for video content at Teen.com and was the backstage correspondent for season 2 of the TruTV talent contest Fake Off. In 2017, she and fellow YouTuber Jimmy Wong co-hosted the video game themed variety show Polaris Primetime which was part of Disney's inaugural "D | XP" summer programming block on Disney XD. She's also the co-writer of the comic-book miniseries Radiant Pink: Across the Universe.

== Early life ==
Meghan Channing Camarena was born in Fresno, California, on July 17, 1987, and grew up in Modesto. In her Draw My Life video, she said she had two older half-brothers from her parents' previous marriages, and younger twin brothers later. She would often take care of her younger brothers while her father was away and because her mother had suffered a bevy of physical problems and was on medication a lot. She graduated from Davis High School in 2005. Although she said she did okay in school, because of her mother's hardships, she said she was fairly depressed, had taken up drinking, and in college she had an on-and-off relationship. Her grandmother took her to church where she made peace with God, left her boyfriend, and joined a Bible college internship program.

During this time, she learned video production for her youth group. She was inspired by some YouTubers, and began making home videos. She started up a YouTube channel called strawburry17 in 2007 where she would do video blogging, lip dubbing, and would later have videos on "unboxing cutesy Japanese toys, taste-testing weird foods from around the world, and reviewing apps and games." Camarena said that she chose her AOL screen name based on a Strawberry Shortcake cartoon, and that her birthday was on the 17th, but since "strawberry17" was taken, she went with a different spelling. Her first music video was a lip dub of "I'm a Gummy Bear" and featured her brother. Her videos soon became popular and she was getting offers from record and media companies.

== Career ==
In 2010, she began corresponding with YouTuber Joey Graceffa who was located in Boston, Massachusetts, and who was planning to move to Los Angeles. In 2011, she met YouTuber Jimmy Wong who had encouraged her to enter a YouTube video contest called Next Up where the prize was $35k. She said she entered that in the last minute. She was selected as one of the 25 winners, and attended a YouTube boot camp in Manhattan. Using her Next Up money, she moved to Los Angeles In 2012, a YouTube upstart company called Big Frame arranged for her a trip to India where she made videos for the nonprofit organization Water.org. In Los Angeles, she produced videos for Teen.com and also hosted their YouTube channel along with Graceffa. The same year, when Google updated its analytics to throw out inactive and closed subscriber accounts, Camarena said she started treating her YouTube channel more like a company rather than just an Internet channel. She had produced videos five days a week. She would also prepare videos in a large batch for the season, so it could run over several months. She and Graceffa participated in season 22 of The Amazing Race, where they competed as "Team Cute" and finished fifth overall. They would return for the All-Stars season, where they were eliminated in the third episode and finished ninth overall. Also in 2014, she produced a zombie-themed short film called The Grey Road which was funded by Ron Howard's New Form Incubator program.

In 2015, she was the backstage correspondent for the second season of Fake Off, which was a talent show broadcast on TruTV. She signed a deal with Disney's Maker Studios where she worked on creating online content in the entertainment industry. Her YouTube channel went over 1 million subscribers. In October of that year, she and other YouTube creators made a project called Spider-Man Murder Mystery which ran on Instagram. Camarena played character Gwen Stacy, who also goes by "Spider-Gwen". She starred as one of the eight correspondents of Unlocked: The World of Games, Revealed, a multi-part documentary on video games, where she followed people involved in e-sports. In 2017, she and Wong were selected to co-host the video game themed variety show Polaris Primetime which was created as part of Disney's "D | XP" programming block on Disney XD. In 2018, she and YouTubers Markiplier, Jacksepticeye and LuzuGames launched Twitch channels. In 2020, she and Power Rangers Hyperforce director Melissa Flores released a RPG web series called The Unleashed on Twitch.

In February 2022, Camarena made her comic book debut co-writing the 12th issue of Radiant Black alongside Kyle Higgins. Late that year it was announced that Camarena would be co-writing a spin-off miniseries as a part of Image's Massive-Verse called Radiant Pink: Across the Universe, with Melissa Flores, with the first issue set to debut in December 2022. In April 2023, it was announced that Camarena and Flores would be doing a one-shot comic continuation of Power Rangers Hyperforce, that is set to release in July 2023 by Boom! Studios.

Camarena has appeared at several conventions including multiple VidCons, SXSW, Playlist Live and various Comic-Cons. In 2016, she was an L.A. Biz Women of Influence honoree. She cited Tina Fey and Amy Poehler as some of her biggest influences and inspirations. She and YouTuber Jacksepticeye hosted the Level Up! games panel at the D23 Expo 2017.

== Personal life ==
Camarena is half-Mexican and half German-Irish. She moved to Los Angeles in 2011. She came out as pansexual publicly in 2020 and in a post on social media she thanked people for their "kind messages and encouragement."

In addition to attending YouTube related conventions, she has participated as a cosplayer, an activity she has done since 2011. She, Graceffa and YouTuber Catherine Valdes had also created a band called The Tributes with music video parodies based on The Hunger Games film series.

In March 2026, Camamena posted on social media that she was dating Arryn Zech, a bisexual voice actor, with Zech later confirming it in her own post, and describing Camamena as a person who makes her "feel safe and loved" and "pretty girl". Both began a relationship after messaging each other online. Caramena later shared that she and Zech were living together. She described Zech as a "sounding board, a safe space, an incredible teammate...easily the hottest roommate to ever exist" and a "special" person.

== Filmography ==
Year	Title	Role	Notes	Ref.
2012	Tabletop	Guest	Episode "Gloom"	
2013	The Amazing Race 22	Contestant	with Joey Graceffa	
2013	Video Game High School	Rapwnzel	Episode "Welcome to Varsity"	
2013–14	The Misfortune of Being Ned	Wendy, others		
2013	Dance Showdown	Contestant	season 3	
2014	The Amazing Race 24: All-Stars	Contestant	with Joey Graceffa	
2014	The Grey Road (a.k.a. The Void)	M'lia Sharp	Director, producer, Short film, funded by Ron Howard's New Form Incubator program	
2014	The New Adventures of Peter + Wendy	Billie Jukes	Web series, season 2	
2015	Fight of the Living Dead	Cast member	season 1	
2015	Bob Thunder: Internet Assassin	Self (Strawburry 17)		
2015	Clash of Karts: Mario Kart 8	Coach	Disney XD e-sports special	
2015	Fake Off	Backstage correspondent	Season 2	
2015	What's Trending: Experiences	Herself	Collaboration webseries between Marriott and What's Trending	
2016	Unlocked: The World of Games, Revealed	Herself	Multi-part documentary, principal cast	
2017	Polaris Primetime	Co-host	with Jimmy Wong, broadcast on Disney XD's "D | XP" block	
2017	Parker Plays	Recurring guest	broadcast on D | XP	
2017	Polaris: Player Select	Recurring Character	broadcast on D | XP	
2017	Power Rangers Hyperforce	Chloe Ashford / Hyperforce Pink Ranger	RPG web series, cast member	
2019	Power Rangers: Battle for the Grid	Kimberly Hart / Ranger Slayer / Mighty Morphin Pink Ranger	Video game, voice-over role	
2019	KOllOK 1991	Skye Hawkins	RPG web series, cast member	
2020	The Unleashed	Phee	Also Executive Producer, Producer, Series creator, Developer. RPG web series	
