= Batman: Gates of Gotham =

Monthly comic book

- The cover to Gates of Gotham #1, showcasing various members of the Batman family. Art by Trevor McCarthy.

Publication information
- Publisher: DC Comics
- Genre
- Publication date: May 2011
- Main character(s): Batman (Dick Grayson); Red Robin; Blackbat; Robin

Creative team
- Written by: Scott Snyder; Kyle Higgins; Ryan Parrott
- Penciller: Trevor McCarthy

Batman: Gates of Gotham is a five-issue, monthly comic book limited series published by the comic book publishing company DC Comics involving the various characters of the Batman franchise. It is written by Scott Snyder and Kyle Higgins, and illustrated by Trevor McCarthy. The first issue was published on May 18, 2011.

== Publication history ==
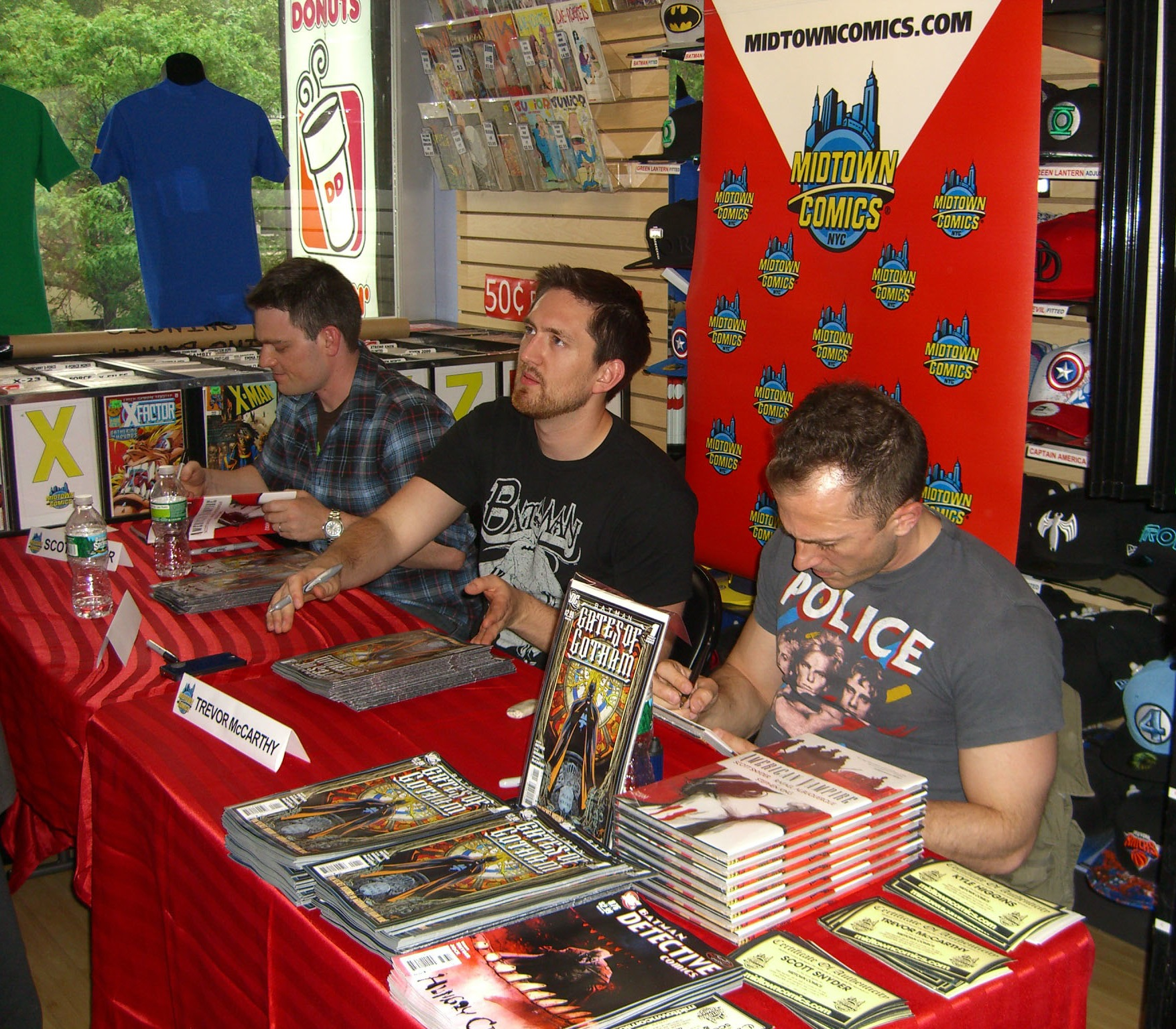
From left to right: writers Scott Snyder and Kyle Higgins, and artist Trevor McCarthy at a signing for issue #1 at Midtown Comics in Manhattan, May 19, 2011.

Preview art from the series was released by DC in April 2011, one month before the first issue's release.

The series revolves around a decades-old mystery connected to the founding fathers of Gotham City that comes to light in the present day, leading Batman to assemble a team of detectives to try to unravel the conspiracy. In addition to Batman, the series features Red Robin, Black Bat (Cassandra Cain) and Robin (Damian Wayne) as the main characters.

The series was used as a launching point for several high-profile Batman storylines in 2011, and also touched upon elements introduced in Grant Morrison's The Return of Bruce Wayne limited series.

== Plot summary ==
Batman and Red Robin are trying to solve a case where there were 300 pounds of explosives on the Gotham bridges when it mysteriously blows up. After saving a civilian and talking to Jim Gordon about what happened, Batman confronts Penguin but Penguin denies any accountability. While talking to Tim Drake, Damian Wayne and Cassandra Cain show up to investigate who built the bridges and realizes the Elliots were also one of the founding families of Gotham.

During flashbacks, architect Cyrus Pickney and Judge Solomon Wayne created The New Trigate Project (a large suspension bridge that would provide access to Gotham City from the west) alongside Theodore Cobblepott, Bradley, and Edward Elliot. Hush is taken hostage by a mysterious figure while Batman and Red Robin try to warn Penguin. Batman finds and saves Hush from being exploded while Damian fails to disable a bomb that destroys Penguin's hideout.

In the past, the bridge collapses on one of the Bradley brothers, and the remaining families relocate the bridge to Kane County instead. Nicholas Bradley tries to convince Alan Wayne that the Kane family sabotaged the bridge so their property can be the new entry point for the Trigate project, but Alan Wayne rejects Bradley's offer of accusing the Kane family. Enraged, Nicholas Bradley murdered Cameron Kane's son by accident and is taken to Arkham Asylum. In the present day, Batman deduces that the mysterious figure that is attacking everyone is one of the Bradley's descendants name Zachary and with the help of Damian, Tim, and Cassandra they thwart his plans.

== Critical reception ==
The entire series received an Average rating of 7.5 out of 10 based on 31 reviews.
