= Rogue Sun =

American comic book series

- Cover of Rogue Sun Vol. 1: Cataclysm

Publication information
- Publisher: Image Comics
- Format: Ongoing series
- Genre: Supernatural; Superhero; Action
- Publication date: March 2, 2022
- No. of issues: 26 issues; (4 volumes & 2 issues)
- Main characters: Dylan Siegel; Marcus Bell; Aurie Bell

Creative team
- Written by: Ryan Parrott
- Artist(s): A. Abel(Illustrater, Penciler, and Inker)
- Letterer: Becca Carey
- Colorist: Chris O'Halloran
- Editor: Michael Busuttil

Collected editions
- Vol 1: Cataclysm: ISBN 978-1-5343-2237-0
- Vol 2: Hellbent: ISBN 978-1-5343-2470-1
- Vol 3: Knight Sun: ISBN 978-1-5343-9723-1
- Vol 4: Divinity: ISBN 978-1-5343-2753-5
- Vol 5: Noxious: ISBN 978-1-5343-3235-5
- Vol 6: Mr. Poe: ISBN 978-1-5343-3021-4

Rogue Sun is an ongoing American comic book series written by Ryan Parrott and illustrated by A. Abel. Published by Image Comics on March 22, 2022, the series features the eponymous character of the same name who first appeared in the comic book one-shot titled Supermassive. Rogue Sun takes place within Massive-Verse (a sub-franchise of the Image Universe)—a shared superhero universe that includes several other titles like Radiant Black, The Dead Lucky, and Inferno Girl Red.

Set in modern-day New Orleans, the series follows Dylan Siegel, a rebellious teenager who inherits the mantle of the superhero Rogue Sun, after the death of his estranged father, Marcus Bell—the city's former hero and protector. Tasked with safeguarding the world from the forces of the supernatural and solving his father's murder, Dylan will be forced to depend on the family his father abandoned him and his mother for, and come to terms with the man he's spent the majority of his life hating.

== Plot ==
The series begins with Marcus Bell—The original Rogue Sun's mysterious death during a battle with a hooded adversary who was aware of his secret identity and disrupted his powers by targeting the Sun Stone—the source of Rogue Sun's abilities. Marcus had abandoned his son—Dylan Siegel, and the boys mother—Gwen Siegel 15 years ago, only to marry another woman named Juliette Bell a year later, having two other children with her. He left when Dylan was just a child, resulting in the boy's strong resentment toward his absentee father, yet Marcus had included Dylan in his will. During the reading of said will at the Bell family estate, Dylan is unexpectedly chosen to inherit the Sun Stone and Rogue Sun's powers, much to the surprise and resentment of his half-siblings, Aurie and Brock. The Sun Stone grants Dylan a mystical suit of armor he can summon at will, the ability to fly, enhanced strength, durability and speed, and the ability to generate and manipulate mystical Fire and weapons, as Dylan is thrust into a world of supernatural threats and must quickly adapt to his new role as a Superhero.

Initially overwhelmed, Dylan struggles with his new responsibilities. His early unsuccessful encounters with villains like Suave & Billy Bludmoon highlight his inexperience and need for guidance. Dylan discovers that Marcus's spirit which he can now see and hear, is bound to the Sun stone. Marcus provides guidance to Dylan on how to use his new abilities and adjust to the superhero life. Dylan initially wants nothing to do with his father—ignoring his advice and warnings, but he eventually heeds when he realizes that innocent lives are at stake and depend on his endeavors as a hero. Aurie—Dylan's half-sister, makes a dangerous decision trying to forcefully take the Sun Stone from Dylan, a decision that almost cost him his life, but he manages to survive with help from an unexpected enemy—revealing the culprit responsible for Marcus's murder.

After dealing with his father's unexpected killer and freeing himself and the Sun Stone from his father's lingering spirit, Dylan—now living with the Bell family in their estate continues to struggle with mastering Rogue Sun's abilities and balancing the Superhero life with his normal one, despite the support and training provided by Juliette. His Half-siblings Aurie and Brock intervene, and Dylan is forced to discover the deep Rogue Sun legacy, uncovering a rich history of predecessors, including the cunning and experienced Caleb Hawthorne, the original Rogue Sun from the 14th century, who becomes Dylan's new mentor—teaching him how to use his abilities, he also learns of a being known as Mourningstar from Dotty—a long time ally of Rogue Sun and owner of the Perrine Jewelry Store, where Rogue Sun imprison's his supernatural enemies within special Diamonds. Mourningstar is revealed to be a powerful otherworldly being seeking to crossover into this realm, and the one responsible for the corruption and creation of every supernatural monster and villain Rogue Sun has faced throughout history.

Dylan travels to the Aviary of Secrets, an enigmatic order of women based in a different realm, who gather, record, and store information and secrets. With the help of Caleb, Dylan manages to convince their leader—The Raven Queen, to give him The Quill—a divine talisman capable of weaving gateways between worlds which Dylan intends to use in baiting a powerful advisory and emissary of Mourningstar called Hellbent. Dylan's plan fails, almost getting him killed, and resulting in the death of his classmate which leads him to hand over control of his body and the Rogue Sun armor and abilities to Caleb, who swiftly deals with Hellbent and the other enemies present displaying unprecedented skill and mastery of Rogue Sun's abilities. Caleb, now in full control of Dylan's body, casts Dylan's soul into the Sun Stone and enact's his plan to end the centuries-old war between the Rogue Sun's and Mourningstar, a plan that threatens Dylan's family, friends, and the fate of the entire world. Dylan's father—Marcus, finds him and helps him survive the in Sun stone, and together they manage to possess an old suit of the Rogue Sun armor belonging to Marcus' father and return to the outside world. This leads to an epic confrontation between Dylan—with the help of his entire family, and Caleb—The Knight Sun.

Dylan, now back in control of his own body after defeating Caleb, and willing to give his father's soul a second chance at guiding him is now hell bent on taking on Mourningstar once and for all, despite warnings from Marcus and the others. Dylan deals with the aftermath of Caleb's Plans which resulted in the destruction of the Perrine Jewelry store and release of almost every monster and villain Rogue Sun had trapped in it—hunting and recapturing them. Enter Divinity—Dotty's niece and bounty hunter specializing in the occult, who has supernatural abilities of her own and works for a mysterious organization called THE PERFECTION. She helps Dylan defeat and capture one of the released enemies before assisting her aunt in rebuilding the Perrine Jewelry store and re-establishing the barrier protecting it. Dylan returns to the Aviary of Secrets at the request of the Raven Queen to help solve a murder mystery. Dylan's half-sister Aurie is granted abilities and assumes the Rogue Sun mantle alongside him, with an unwanted Mentor Spirit of her own. This introduces new dynamics and challenges with two active Rogue Suns. Dylan has to uncover the secrets of this anomaly as he and Aurie's partnership is tested by emerging threats and personal conflicts, while also attempting to take on Mourningstar to save his mother.

== Characters ==
=== Main characters ===
- Dylan Siegel/Rogue Sun: The protagonist of the series—a rebellious teenager who discovers that his estranged father, Marcus Bell, was the superhero Rogue Sun. After Marcus's death, Dylan inherits the Sun Stone—the source of his dad's abilities, granting him powers like superhuman strength, flight, pyrokinesis, and an advanced mystical suit of armor he can summon at will. Initially overwhelmed, Dylan struggles with his new responsibilities and the legacy of a father he barely knew. His journey involves confronting supernatural threats and unraveling family secrets.
- Marcus Bell: Dylan's father and the previous Rogue Sun—an experienced well achieved seasoned hero. While in a relationship with Gwen Siegel, Marcus and Gwen have a child named Dylan. For a yet undisclosed reason, Marcus abandoned them both when Dylan was still a baby to start a family with another woman—having two other children with her. His adventures as Rouge Sun eventually lead to his demise at the hands of an unexpected enemy. After his death, his spirit becomes bound to the Sun Stone, offering guidance—and sometimes criticism—to Dylan.
- Aurie Bell: Dylan's half-sister—an intelligent, resourceful, and dangerously driven character, she means to do good, but Is often shown making misguided decisions to achieve her goals. She possesses useful knowledge of the occult—having a keen understanding of how the Sun Stone works. She assists Dylan in his new role and eventually gains powers and abilities of her own, becoming a second Rogue Sun. This development introduces new dynamics and challenges, as the siblings navigate their shared legacy.
- Gwen Siegel: Dylan's mother and former partner of Marcus Bell. She is shown to be a protective mother who is wary of the superhero world, often worrying about Dylan and the toll his superhero life is taking on him and wanting his normal life to come first before the superhero one. She resents Dylan's dad for abandoning them and later makes a deal with an otherworldly being for powers, becoming the villain Cataclysm. She kills Marcus to prevent him form interfering in their sons life after he tells her she can't stop him.
- Juliette Bell: is the mother of Aurie and Brock Bell and the widow of Marcus Bell, the former Rogue Sun. As the matriarch of the Bell family, she plays a pivotal role in the series taking Dylan into her home to live with their family after his mother is imprisoned, providing a physical trainer for him to better prepare him for his superhero life, healing his injuries with the Asclepius Shroud, and maintaining stability between Dylan and his half-siblings.
- Dotty Perrine: She owns Perrine Jewelry, a front for imprisoning supernatural villains. As long-time ally of the Rogue Sun legacy, Dotty mentors Dylan in managing mystical threats as she is shown to have a high-level understanding of the occult—able to perform powerful rituals and spells. Her experience and connections are invaluable to Dylan as he adapts to his new role.
- Divinity: Dotty's niece, an occult bounty hunter with mystical abilities and a tragic past. She aids in maintaining the prison for supernatural entities and works for a mysterious mystical organization called The Perfection. Divinity's expertise as a bounty hunter having faced many mystical creatures and villains complements the efforts to keep supernatural threats at bay.
- The Raven Queen (Amber Cardling): she rules the Aviary of Secrets, a dimension where birds carry secrets and information. She possesses the Quill, a powerful artifact, and has a complex history with the Rogue Sun lineage having known Dylan's father well and worked with both of them on various occasions. Her interactions with Dylan are pivotal in his quest to understand and harness his powers.

=== Villains ===
- Mourningstar: a demonic entity ruling a dark realm, serving as the primary antagonist of the many Rogue Suns through the ages. As generational enemy of Rogue Sun, Mourningstar seeks to conquer Earth and is responsible for the corruption and creation of various supernatural monsters and villains. He is seen to be trapped in his realm unable to cross over physically, but can communicate with and grant people with strong desire and hatred immense power to do his bidding.
- Caleb Hawthorne/Knight Sun: Caleb is the original Rogue Sun from the 1300s, Shown to be an extremely skilled fighter with keen knowledge of the workings of the Sun Stone and Rogue Suns abilities. Now an embittered spirit, Caleb becomes Dylan's mentor, teaching him how to use his abilities. However, Caleb betrays and manipulates Dylan—stealing his body and trapping his soul in the soul stone to hatch a misguided master plan with Mourningstar.
- Hunter/Hellbent: Hunter is the son of one of Suave's henchmen who was stopped by Rogue Sun from stealing a powerful artifact. Blaming Dylan for his father's injuries and declining medical condition, Hunter strikes a deal with the Demonic entity—Mourningstar becoming the powerful sword-wielding villain Hellbent, seeking revenge on Dylan and adding a personal vendetta to the mix of threats the hero faces.
- Suave: Mourningstar's loyal servant, a debonair swordsman, and one of Dylan's early adversaries. Not shown to possess any supernatural abilities, but Known for his elegant style, movements, speech, and combat skills, Suave has a history with Marcus—the original Rogue Sun, and plays a role in introducing Gwen to Mourningstar, who gave her her powers.
- Billy Bloodmoon: a formidable foe of Rogue Sun who is a vampire-werewolf hybrid with the combined strengths and weaknesses of both creatures. His unique abilities initially pose significant challenges for Dylan in his early days as Rogue Sun.

=== Others ===
- Brock Bell: Dylan's younger half-brother—initially skeptical of Dylan's abilities and intentions but later develops a good relationship with him. While not directly involved in the superhero aspects, Brock is shown to be resourceful—helping Dylan create a Watch like device to hold the Sun Stone. He also has a good understanding of the occult and mystical world and provides indirect support to Dylan.
- Vanessa Myers: the love interest of Dylan and his ex. Due to Dylan's irresponsible actions, she breaks up with him, but Dylan keeps trying to win her back. Her role in the broader narrative provides additional context and depth to the story.
- Byron Fletcher: a friend and classmate of Dylan who becomes involved in the supernatural events surrounding Rogue Sun leading to his death, a pivotal moment in the story which convinces Dylan to start taking his job as a superhero and protector seriously, and care about saving lives.

== Publication history ==
Image Comics initially announced Rogue Sun in November 2021 as part of its expanding creator-owned superhero line of comic books, with writer—Ryan Parrott and artist—A. Abel attached to the new series as its creators. The character first appeared in the crossover one‑shot comic book titled—Supermassive (cover-dated February 2022), which has produced subsequent releases each year since the original. In that issue, Image revealed the new hero ahead of his solo launch, while also teasing his soon-coming death. The standalone Rogue Sun series debuted with issue 1 which went on sale in early March 2022, and introduced the original character's son inheriting the mantle after his death (Image's solicitation had originally scheduled issue 1 for mid‑February 2022, but the issue ultimately shipped in early March).

The Rogue Sun series has since continued with a roughly monthly release into 2025, producing a total of 26 issues (as of April 2025). Its first six‑issue story arc was collected as Volume 1, published August 24, 2022. Subsequent arcs were similarly gathered in trade paperbacks: Volume 2 (collecting issues 7–12) was released on May 17, 2023, Volume 3 (collecting issues 13–18) released on March 27, 2024, and Volume 4 (collecting issues 19–24) released on February 19, 2025. These collected editions are explicitly listed on Image's website with those publication dates. As of spring 2025, the comic remains ongoing, as issue 26 was recently published on April 16, 2025 – indicating the series' continuation beyond the initial story arcs and trade releases.

Rogue Sun also appears in the subsequent Supermassive releases—Supermassive (2023), which follows Rogue Sun's exploits as he draws other heroes in to search for the Holy Grail, and Supermassive (2024), which follows Rogue Sun and other heroes as they travel to another timeline to save a friend and fellow superhero. These Supermassive titles add to the story, and build off of plot points in Rogue Sun and the other Massive-Verse books.

== Collected editions ==
Title	Material collected	Publication date	ISBN
Rogue Sun Vol 1: Cataclysm	Chapters 1–6	August 24, 2022	978-1-5343-2237-0
Rogue Sun Vol 2: Hellbent	Chapters 7–12	May 17, 2023	978-1-5343-2470-1
Rogue Sun Vol 3: Knight Sun	Chapters 13–18	March 27, 2024	978-1-5343-9723-1
Rogue Sun Vol 4: Divinity	Chapters 19–24	February 19, 2025	978-1-5343-2753-5
Rogue Sun Vol 5: Noxious	Chapters 25–29	September 10, 2025	978-1-5343-3235-5
Rogue Sun Vol 6: Mr. Poe	Chapters 30–35	July 15, 2026	978-1-5343-3021-4

== Reception and sales ==
The first volume of Rogue Sun received a positive review on the website Goodreads, with a strong average rating of 3.93 out of 5 for 47 reviews and 385 ratings.

The second volume of Rogue Sun got a positive 5/5 star rating form the website Comicsonline, with Matt Sernaker saying "If you are looking for creative new titles that are outside of the big two publishers, the Massive-Verse books are sure to impress".

The first 26 issues of the Comic Book Series, including all 4 released volumes have received mostly positive reviews, holding a strong average critic rating of 8.2 out of 10 for 108 reviews, and a slightly lower average user rating of 7.8 out of 10 for 90 reviews on the review aggregator website, Comic Book Roundup.

The debut of Rogue Sun in early 2022 was marked by a firm retailer order: Diamond's March 2022 chart shows roughly 43,118 copies of Rogue Sun #1 shipped to comic shops. That placed it in the Top 10 of that month's sales (ranked number 8 by units sold). Like many new Image/indie superhero books, it then saw the typical steep drop on #2: Rogue Sun #2 (April 2022 release) fell to about 12,571 units, a roughly 70% decline. Issue #3 rebounded only slightly to about 13,176. In other words, after the huge debut, Rogue Sun settled into a roughly 10–15K per issue range.

Diamond stopped publishing full sales charts after April 2022, so we lack official month-by-month figures beyond #3. However, available reorder data and industry reports suggest that subsequent issues continued at that modest level. A brief summer 2022 hiatus (after issue #6) and an erratic monthly schedule may have slowed momentum, but no later issue of Rogue Sun is known to have drastically reversed the pattern; sales essentially plateaued in the low-to-mid-teens thousands per issue after the launch. As a point of comparison, the other Massive-Verse launch Radiant Red went from~38,972 at #1 to ~14,281 at #2, a very similar drop-and-stabilize curve.
