= Trevor McCarthy =

American comic book artist and illustrator

- Notable works: Batman: Gates of Gotham, Nightwing, Detective Comics Annual

Trevor McCarthy is an American comic book artist and illustrator. He is best known for his work on Nightwing the New Order, Nightwing, Batman: Gates of Gotham, Batwoman, Aquaman, and Klarion the Witch Boy, all published through DC Comics a subsidiary of Warner Bros. Entertainment Group.

== Bibliography ==
=== Penciller ===
- Aquaman (2011)
- Aquaman (2012)
- Aquaman: A Celebration of 75 Years (2016)
- Batman (1940)
- Batman (2007)
- Batman (2011)
- Batman - The Dark Knight (2012)
- Batman Eternal (2014)
- Batman Eternal (2015)
- Batman Saga Hors Série (2012)
- Batman: Bruce Wayne - Mörder? (2003)
- Batman: Bruce Wayne - Murderer? (2002)
- Batman: Bruce Wayne: Fugitive (2003)
- Batman: Gates of Gotham (2011)
- Batwoman (2011)
- Batwoman (2012)
- Batwoman [GER] (2012)
- Blink (2001)
- Convergence Suicide Squad (2015)
- The DC Comics Encyclopedia (2004)
- DC Comics: Zero Year (2014)
- DC Miniserie (2012)
- DC Sneak Peek: Aquaman (2015)
- DCU Halloween Special 2010 (2010)
- Detective Comics (1937)
- Flash (2012)
- Gen-Active (2000)
- Green Lantern: Rise of the Third Army (2012)
- Green Lantern/Atom (2000)
- Justice League [GER] (2012)
- Klarion (2014)
- Lonebow (2005)
- Nightwing (1996)
- Nightwing (2011)
- Nightwing (2012)
- Nightwing: The New Order (2017)
- Secret Origins (2014)
- SpyBoy (1999)
- SpyBoy: Motorola Special (2000)
- Superman 80-Page Giant 2011 (2011)
- T.H.U.N.D.E.R. Agents (2012)
- Terminator (2000)
- The Terminator Omnibus (2008)
- The Terminator: The Dark Years (1999)
- X-Men: Age of Apocalypse Dawn (2016)
- X-Men: The Complete Age of Apocalypse Epic (2005)

=== Inker ===
- Aquaman (2011)
- Aquaman (2012)
- Aquaman: A Celebration of 75 Years (2016)
- Batman (1940)
- Batman (2007)
- Batman (2011)
- Batman - The Dark Knight (2012)
- Batman Eternal (2014)
- Batman Eternal (2015)
- Batman Saga Hors Série (2012)
- Batman: Gates of Gotham (2011)
- Batwoman (2011)
- Batwoman (2012)
- Batwoman [GER] (2012)
- Blackhawks (2011)
- Convergence Suicide Squad (2015)
- DC Comics: Zero Year (2014)
- DC Miniserie (2012)
- DC Sneak Peek: Aquaman (2015)
- DCU Halloween Special 2010 (2010)
- Detective Comics (1937)
- Flash (2012)
- Green Lantern: Rise of the Third Army (2012)
- Klarion (2014)
- Nightwing (2011)
- Nightwing (2012)
- Nightwing: The New Order (2017)
- Secret Origins (2014)
- Superman 80-Page Giant 2011 (2011)
- T.H.U.N.D.E.R. Agents (2012)

=== Cover artist ===
- Aquaman (2011)
- Aquaman (2012)
- Batman (2007)
- Batman (2011)
- Batman Beyond 2.0 (2013)
- Batman Beyond Universe (2013)
- Batman Saga Hors Série (2012)
- Batman: Gates of Gotham (2011)
- Batwoman (2011)
- Batwoman [GER] (2012)
- Birds Of Prey (2011)
- C.O.W.L. (2014)
- C.O.W.L. (2016)
- Catwoman (2011)
- Convergence (2015)
- DC Miniserie (2012)
- DC Sneak Peek: Aquaman (2015)
- Green Lantern Corps (2011)
- Image Firsts: C.O.W.L. (2014)
- Injustice: Gods Among Us Year Three (2014)
- Injustice: Gods Among Us: Year Three (2014)
- Justice League Dark (2011)
- Justice League Dark [GER] (2012)
- Klarion (2014)
- Nightwing (1996)
- Nightwing: The New Order (2017)
- Shadowman End Times (2014)
- Talon (2012)
