= David Lafuente =

Spanish-born comic book artist (born 1982)

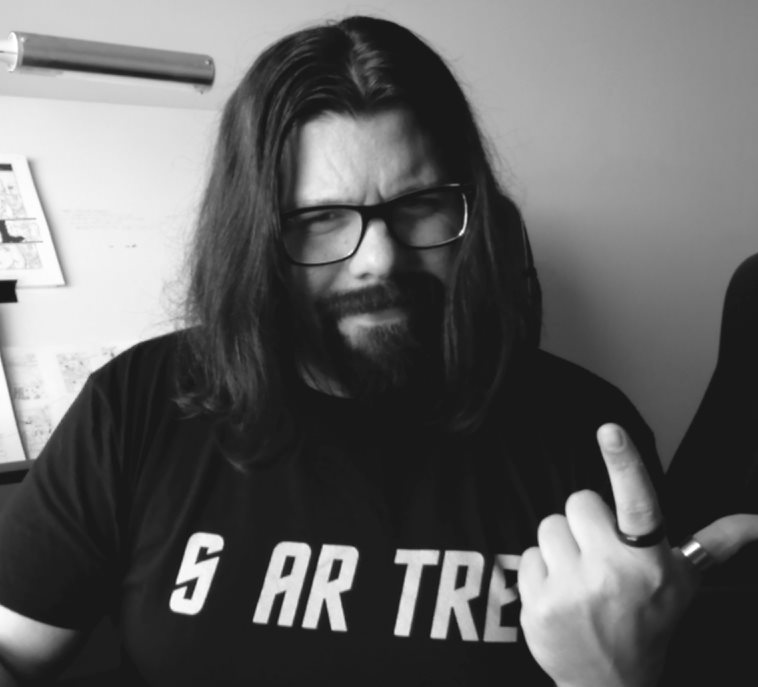
- Lafuente in 2019
- Areas: Penciller, inker, cover artist, concept artist

David Lafuente is a Spanish-born comic book artist known for his work on books such as Ultimate Comics: Spider-Man and Radiant Red: Crime & Punishment. He currently resides in London.

== Career ==
Lafuente first penciled such series as Phénix and Kabur (written by Jean-Marc Lofficier) for Hexagon Comics, then was discovered by Marvel Editor C.B. Cebulski at the Dublin City Comic Con during the editor's self-named talent search ChesterQuest", though the artist's official website displays professional work dated much earlier than this. His first work for Marvel was doing the layouts and coloring for Spider-Man Family #2, Published in 2007. His first major work, however, was providing the pencils/inks for Kathryn Immonen's 2008-2009 Hellcat mini-series. After collaborating with writer Brian Michael Bendis on an Ultimate Spider-Man Annual in 2008, he was picked as the regular artist for that series' 2009 relaunch, which debuted in August 2009. He took over New Mutants as the regular artist, starting on issue 29, which was a tie-in to the 2011 "Fear Itself" storyline.

On April 9, 2011 Lafuente was one of 62 comics creators who appeared at the IGN stage at the Kapow! convention in London to set two Guinness World Records, the Fastest Production of a Comic Book, and Most Contributors to a Comic Book. With Guinness officials on hand to monitor their progress, writer Mark Millar began work at 9 am scripting a 20-page black and white Superior comic book, with Lafuente and the other artists appearing on stage throughout the day to work on the pencils, inks, and lettering, including Dave Gibbons, Frank Quitely, John Romita Jr., Jock, Doug Braithwaite, Ian Churchill, Olivier Coipel, Duncan Fegredo, Simon Furman, John McCrea, Sean Phillips and Liam Sharp, who all drew a panel each, with regular Superior artist Leinil Yu creating the book's front cover. The book was completed in 11 hours, 19 minutes, and 38 seconds, and was published through Icon on November 23, 2011, with all royalties being donated to Yorkhill Children's Foundation.

In January 2015 it was announced that Kieron Gillen, Jim Rossignol and David Lafuente were working on a creator-owned series for Image Comics titled "The Ludocrats." Due to schedule issues, the art ended up being done by Jeff Stokely.

David Lafuente was exclusive to Valiant Comics in 2015 and 2016 and was the regular artist on A&A: The Adventures Of Archer & Armstrong. In 2019 drew the Amazing Spider-Man Annual starring Spider-Ham, written by Jason Latour, later moved to DC Comics to work on Superman with frequent collaborator Brian Michael Bendis.

As of 2022, Lafuente works as video-game concept artist for Atmos.

== YouTube ==
David Lafuente has an active YouTube presence in his own channel and in the Streaming de Dibujantes channel with David Lopez (artist).

== Bibliography ==
Interior comic work includes:

- X-Men: Divided We Stand #1-2 (June 2008-July 2008)
- Patsy Walker: Hellcat #1-5 (September 2008-February 2009)
- Ultimate Spider-Man Annual #3 (October 2008)
- Ultimate Comics: Spider-Man #1-6, 9–14, 150, 152-154 (August 2009-February 2011)
- New Mutants
- A+X (Various stories)
- The Graveyard Book graphic novel adaptation of the Neil Gaiman novel.
- All-New X-Men #15
- Avengers Annual 2013 (Christmas special)
- Ultimate Spider-Man #200
- All-New Doop #1-5 (April 2014-August 2014)
- Batman Eternal #43
- Batman Eternal #52
- A&A: The Adventures of Archer & Armstrong #1-4
- Runaways #13-14
- Amazing Spider-Man Annual 2019 starring Spider-Ham
- Superman #16
- Radiant Black #6
- Radiant Red #1-5

=== Covers only ===
- Runaways vol. 3 #10-12
- Ultimate Comics: Spider-Man #1-15, 150-154 (August 2009-February 2011)
- Scarlet #1 (Variant)
- Young Allies #1-5
- Turf #2 (Variant)
- The Dark Tower: The Fall of Gilead #4 (Variant)
- Young Avengers (Variant)
- A+X
- The Wicked + The Divine #6
- MODOK Assassin #1-5
- Wrath of the Eternal Warrior #1-4
- X-O Manowar #47
- Bloodshot Reborn
- Valiant High #1-4
- Bloodshot Salvation
- Faith & The Future Force #1
- Rom #7-8

== Notes ==
Preceded by Stuart Immonen	Ultimate Comics: Spider-Man artist 2009– 2011	Succeeded by Mark Bagley
