= HALO 8 Entertainment =

Independent film company

HALO-8 Entertainment is an independent film company specializing in genre cinema, documentaries, midnight movies, music-driven lifestyle videos, and animation. Its most popular releases include the films Pop Skull and Threat, the animated series Godkiller and Xombie, the fitness yoga franchise, Fitness For Indie Rockers, and the documentaries Grant Morrison: Talking With Gods, Your Mommy Kills Animals, N.Y.H.C., and Ctrl+Alt+Compete.

Formed in 2005 by Matt Pizzolo and the producer Brian Giberson as a film production studio, the company has grown to include a comic book/graphic novel publishing division and two DVD Premiere shingles. HALO-8 also has a fashion division, H8LA. HALO-8's film catalog is split between in-house productions and third-party acquisitions.

HALO-8 gained popularity by producing controversial films such as the animal-rights documentary Your Mommy Kills Animals. The film drew the attention of the Center for Consumer Freedom, who waged a legal campaign to block its release. HALO-8 has developed tech-driven production and distribution strategies such as designing the "illustrated film" format, a cinematic style of limited animation that merges sequential art with 3D CGI, motion graphics, and voice performances in the style of a radio play. HALO-8 has also developed the non-linear film format "Ether Films" which adds hypertext and multi-platform transmedia functionality to film.

== Imprints and Partnerships ==
=== Halo-8 comics ===
In June 2008, HALO-8 debuted a new comic book publishing arm at Wizard World Chicago with Godkiller (written by Matt Pizzolo, illustrated by Anna Muckcracker).

The following February at Wondercon, Halo-8 unveiled its "illustrated film" format that fuses comic books with cinema and explained Godkiller would be released simultaneously as a print comic book and as episodic illustrated films on shortform DVDs.

In April 2010 at C2E2 in Chicago, Halo-8 premiered the collected Godkiller illustrated film and announced several new comic book series: The Long Knives (a giallo-style revenge adventure written by Pizzolo, illustrated by newcomer Ana Ludeshka), Loaded Bible 2 (continuing the acclaimed Jesus vs vampires series by Tim Seeley (Hack/Slash)), Medusa: Year One (a re-invention of the mythic character as a misunderstood heroine), Godkiller 2 (reuniting Pizzolo and Muckcracker), and Black Sky (a Band of Brothers vs Cthulhu series by Ben Templesmith (30 Days of Night)).

=== First annual Halloween multi-filmmaker showcase DVD ===
In October 2008, HALO-8 debuted a unique, multi-filmmaker showcase project called Slumber Party Slaughterhouse: The Game, a horror DVD game where each death scene is directed by a different HALO-8 filmmaker and stars actors and actresses from various HALO-8 films. Participating filmmakers included Matt Pizzolo, Doug Sakmann, Joanna Angel, Ramzi Abed, and Kurly Tlapoyawa. Participating actors and actresses included Tiffany Shepis, Masuimi Max, Joanna Angel, Melissa Bacelar, and Katie Nisa. The project premiered at the Halo-8: Films That Kill Halloween festival in Hollywood, where live hosts Joanna Angel, Matt Pizzolo, and Daisy Sparks MC'd the event that mixed pub-trivia style gaming with Rocky Horror-style audience participation.

=== Partnership with Epic Level Entertainment for Xombie ===
In November 2008, HALO-8 announced the acquisition of the Xombie web-series produced by James Farr and Epic Level Entertainment's Cindi Rice and John Frank Rosenblum. The March 31, 2009 release date of the Xombie: Dead on Arrival collected series DVD marked HALO-8's entry into distribution of animated films, which was followed by anime-style adaptations of the comic book series currently published under HALO-8's publishing arm.

=== Illustrated films ===
Pizzolo and Giberson began developing what they termed "illustrated films" in late 2007, citing influences Liquid Television, the MTV cartoon adaptation of The Maxx, the Berserk anime series, Chris Marker's La jetée, the motion comic Broken Saints, and the experimental cinema of Ralph Bakshi. Since Pizzolo started out as a playwright, he was interested in using voice performances to drive the pace and action, while composing the visuals from sequential art illustrations in an experimental cinema style utilizing only subtle pans and zooms. Giberson, an Emmy-winning TV producer, pushed Pizzolo to integrate more elaborate animation. The two developed a style that mixed simple limited-animation puppetry with moments of fully animated 3D-CGI. Pizzolo (a longtime comic book fan who previously worked at St. Mark's Comix and Village Comics in NY) decided the sequential art should be composed as a comic book because it was the ideal workflow for creating sequential art. Pizzolo has made clear that this was all theoretical and they might never have executed on the illustrated film style if he had not discovered Anna Muckcracker and recruited her to illustrate the first project, Godkiller.

Pizzolo told Horror News:

There are lots of reasons [Godkiller was made as an illustrated film], but I think the most important one was really being inspired by Anna Muckcracker's gorgeous artwork. Brian Giberson (my partner at Halo-8) and I had been experimenting with the illustrated film format for a while, but we might still have gone with traditional animation for Godkiller since it's really risky to experiment with a crazy story and a new filmmaking format at the same time. But once I saw Anna's art, I knew that no traditional form of animation could do justice to the grimy, textured, surreal aesthetic she created. It was really an artistic choice, because from a business point of view it's just so risky.

Pizzolo has also clarified that the term "illustrated film" was not intended to be a snipe at motion comics, saying he was aware of Broken Saints and has always cited it as an influence but feels motion comics are only one element of the evolving illustrated film style, which is intended to be a constantly evolving multimedia format whose elements are determined by the story rather than the workflow.. He even told Bloody Disgusting that upcoming ill-films may incorporate heavily textured live action and be composed for 3D viewing. Pizzolo also says he is a fan of the Watchmen Motion Comic, but that it hadn't been released yet when he, Giberson, and Muckcracker were producing Godkiller. Pizzolo points out that the contemporary motion comics wave is largely influenced by the Watchmen Motion Comic, so motion comics and illustrated films developed simultaneously but separately from one another. He told Bloody Disgusting, "Godkiller was just a slower production than Watchmen because we had to create 200 pages of art and story from the ground up first, rather than starting with one of the greatest comic books ever made as source material. Plus, we had a dozen voice performers instead of just one."

Wired asked Pizzolo to explain the differences between motion comics and illustrated films:

In illustrated films, we drive the pace of the storytelling with the dramatic voice performances and the sound design, so that allows us to showcase the illustrations in a way where you can really take a moment to absorb the art in the same way you can when reading a comic book ... Motion comics are closer to a form of limited animation that uses comics as source material. Illustrated films are closer to the experimental cinema of Ralph Bakshi's work, Chris Marker's La jetée or animation like Liquid Television.

Pizzolo, Giberson and actresses Danielle Harris and Tiffany Shepis presented two exclusive preview clips of the Godkiller illustrated film at Fangoria's Weekend of Horrors in Los Angeles on April 18, 2009.

Due to overwhelming retail demand far beyond studio expectations, the first episodic DVD's street date was delayed a week until October 6, 2009, allowing for enough DVDs to be manufactured to supply stores. Due to retail holiday conflicts, this delay rescheduled the entire release to: Episode 1 Oct 6 2009, Episode 2 Jan 26 2010, Episode 3 April 16, 2010 (with day & date theatrical release of full feature), Complete film on VOD May 25, 2010, and on DVD July 20, 2010.

The complete 75-minute feature Godkiller: Walk Among Us premiered at the C2E2 comic con in Chicago on April 16, 2010, before playing theatrically in 10 cities. On May 25, 2010, it was distributed via cable VOD to 75 million homes.

=== Growth of illustrated films division ===
Following the success of Godkiller, HALO-8 ramped up the illustrated film line by growing the slate of its comic book publishing division while also entering into partnerships with other comic book publishers and creators. HALO-8 announced deals to produce illustrated film adaptations of Loaded Bible and Xombie: Reanimated.

Shortly after HALO-8 announced the Xombie: Reanimated illustrated film, it was announced DreamWorks SKG is developing a live-action Xombie: Reanimated film to be produced with Alex Kurtzman and Roberto Orci.

During Halo-8's panel at WonderCon 2010, Pizzolo unveiled a first look at his giallo animation The Long Knives, which had recently begun production. Two weeks later during Halo-8's panel at C2E2, Pizzolo confirmed his collaboration with Tim Seeley on Loaded Bible and then unveiled two new projects in development: Medusa: Year One and Ben Templesmith's Black Sky. In September 2010, MTV Splash Page announced that Pizzolo will direct an illustrated film adaptation of the popular comic book series Hack/Slash. In December 2010, a teaser-trailer was released for the illustrated film Black Sky, illustrated and created by Ben Templesmith (30 Days of Night, Welcome To Hoxford, Choker) and directed by Pizzolo.

=== H8LA ===
In November 2009, HALO-8 launched branded-apparel division H8LA, enlisting stylist Aubrie Davis (formerly of Hot Topic and H&M stores) to join the team as Creative Director. Davis began with a line of T-shirts based on Godkiller. Actors Bill Moseley, Danielle Harris, and Tiffany Shepis served double-duty on Godkiller, performing in the film and modeling the T-shirts for H8LA.

== Affiliated production companies ==
- 456 Productions
- Backseat Conceptions
- Bloodshot Pictures
- Burning Angel
- Burning Paradise
- DiY-Fest Video
- Epic Level Entertainment
- Hells Bells Productions
- Indie Genius Productions
- Kings Mob Productions
- Lost Angeles Films
- Microsoft
- Respect! Films
- Savage Roses Productions
- Sequart Organization
- Sunny Bastards Films
- UnitShifter Films

== Releases ==
=== 2006 ===
- Beer: The Movie - dir. Peter Hoare (456 Productions)
- Beer 2: Leaving Long Island - dir. Peter Hoare (456 Productions)
- Beer 2: The Soundtrack (456 Productions)
- Threat - dir. Matt Pizzolo (Kings Mob Productions)
- Threat: Original Motion Picture Soundtrack (Kings Mob Productions)
- Threat: Music That Inspired The Movie (Kings Mob Productions)

=== 2007 ===
- Exist - dir. Esther Bell (Hells Bells Productions, Merlion Entertainment)
- Pilates For Indie Rockers - with Chaos; by Brandi Krieger
- Vegan Cooking For Animal Lovers - with The Hardcore Chef (DiY-Fest)
- Yoga For Indie Rockers - with Chaos; by Brandi Krieger
- Your Mommy Kills Animals - dir. Curt Johnson (Indie Genius Productions)

=== 2008 ===
- Bianca Beauchamp: All Access - dir. Martin Perreault
- The Devil's Muse - dir. Ramzi Abed; with Kristen Kerr, Gidget Gein, Cinqué Lee, Julie Strain, Lizzy Strain, Masuimi Max, Dame Darcy; score composed by David J, Ego Plum
- Gimme Skelter - dir. Scott Phillips; with Gunnar Hansen, Trent Haaga, Kurly Tlapoyawa
- Godkiller: Walk Among Us (graphic novel) - writer/creator Matt Pizzolo, illustrator Anna Muckcracker
- N.Y.H.C. - dir. Frank Pavich; with Madball, 25 Ta Life, Vision of Disorder, District 9, No Redeeming Social Value, 108
- Pink Eye - dir. James Tucker; writer Joshua Nelson; with Melissa Bacelar, Joshua Nelson, Bridget Megan Clark, Alan Rowe Kelly, Raine Brown
- Punk & Disorderly - with The Business, Sham 69, Anti-Nowhere League, Conflict, The Oppressed, The Boys, The Varukers
- Punk Rock Holocaust 2 - dir. Doug Sakmann (Backseat Conceptions)
- The Sick & Twisted Horror of Joanna Angel - dir. Doug Sakmann (Backseat Conceptions); with Joanna Angel (Burning Angel)
- Slumber Party Slaughterhouse: The Game - dir. Matt Pizzolo, Doug Sakmann, Joanna Angel, Ramzi Abed, Kurly Tlapoyawa; with Tiffany Shepis, Masuimi Max, Joanna Angel, Melissa Bacelar, Katie Nisa

=== 2009 ===
- Cardio For Indie Rockers - with Chaos; by Brandi Krieger
- Godkiller: Walk Among Us - Episode 1 - dir. Matt Pizzolo, illustrated by Anna Muckcracker; with Davey Havok, Lance Henriksen, Danielle Harris, Bill Moseley, Tiffany Shepis, Justin Pierre, Lydia Lunch, Katie Nisa, Nicki Clyne
- In A Spiral State - dir. Ramzi Abed; edited by Ken Cravens; with Bianca Barnett, Lizzy Strain, Juliana Fine, Mae Moreno, Messy Stench, Elissa Dowling (Bloodshot Pictures)
- Pop Skull - dir. Adam Wingard; written by E.L. Katz, Lane Hughes, Adam Wingard; produced by Peter Katz, Lane Hughes, Adam Wingard, E.L. Katz; with Lane Hughes, Brandon Carroll, Maggie Henry, Hannah Hughes (Hunter Films, Population 1280 Films)
- Xombie: Dead On Arrival - dir. James Farr; produced by James Farr, Cindi Rice, John Frank Rosenblum (Epic Level Entertainment)

=== 2010 ===
- Godkiller: Walk Among Us - Episode 2 - dir. Matt Pizzolo, ill. Anna Muckcracker; with Davey Havok, Lance Henriksen, Danielle Harris, Bill Moseley, Tiffany Shepis, Justin Pierre, Lydia Lunch, Katie Nisa, Nicki Clyne
- Godkiller: Walk Among Us - Episode 3 - dir. Matt Pizzolo, ill. Anna Muckcracker; with Davey Havok, Lance Henriksen, Danielle Harris, Bill Moseley, Tiffany Shepis, Justin Pierre, Lydia Lunch, Katie Nisa, Nicki Clyne
- Godkiller: Walk Among Us - The Collected Film - dir. Matt Pizzolo, ill. Anna Muckcracker; with Davey Havok, Lance Henriksen, Danielle Harris, Bill Moseley, Tiffany Shepis, Justin Pierre, Lydia Lunch, Katie Nisa, Nicki Clyne
- Grant Morrison: Talking with Gods - dir. Patrick Meaney, Prod. Amber Yoder, Jordan Rennert, Mike Phillips, Julian Darius, F.J. DeSanto; DP Jordan Rennert; with Grant Morrison, Warren Ellis, Geoff Johns, Douglas Rushkoff, Frank Quitely, Dan DiDio, Frazer Irving, Phil Jimenez, Cameron Stewart, Jill Thompson, Mark Waid

=== 2011 ===
- Bianca Beauchamp: All Access 2 - dir. Martin Perreault
- Ctrl+Alt+Compete - created by Microsoft; dir. Brian Giberson; executive produced by Daryll McDade, Tina Wood Summerford, Andrew Stephan, John Dorsey; prod. John Formichella, Matt Pizzolo; written by Matt Pizzolo, Brian Giberson, John Dorsey, John Formichella; with Nolan Bushnell, Felicia Day, Veronica Belmont, Cliff Bleszinski, Randy Pitchford, Tim O'Reilly, Simon Sinek, Gary Kremen, Mark Suster, Josh Harris, Steve Rubel, Tommy Tallarico, Tony Hsieh
- The New Erotic - dir. Ramzi Abed; with Eon McKai, Kimberly Kane, Dave Naz, Vena Virago, Ed Fox, Jack The Zipper, Alejandra Guerrero, Tori Black
- Warren Ellis: Captured Ghosts - dir. Patrick Meaney, prod. Jordan Rennert, Mike Phillips, Julian Darius, F.J. DeSanto; DP Jordan Rennert; with Warren Ellis, Helen Mirren, Joss Whedon, Wil Wheaton, Patton Oswalt, Ben Templesmith, Matt Fraction, Joe Quesada, Molly Crabapple, Stoya, Jason Aaron, Darick Robertson, Phil Jimenez, Cully Hamner

=== 2012 ===
- EDGE: Perspectives on Drug-Free Culture - directors Michael Kirchner, Marc Pierschel; with Ian MacKaye, Ray Cappo, Karl Buechner, Davey Havok, Toby Morse, Brandan Schieppati

=== In development ===
- Black Sky - creator Ben Templesmith
- Loaded Bible - creator Tim Seeley
- Medusa: Year One - creator Matt Pizzolo
- Xombie: Reanimated - creator James Farr
