= DiY-Fest =

DiY-Fest "the touring carnival of Do-it-Yourself mediamaking" was a festival of ultra-independent movies, books, zines, music, poetry, and performance art that ran from 1999 until 2002.

In 2007, DiY-Fest was revived as DiY-Fest Video, a DVD production company devoted to alt-lifestyle instructional videos. Its first productions were Yoga For Indie Rockers (DVD release Oct 30, 2007), Pilates For Indie Rockers (DVD release Nov 13, 2007), and Vegan Cooking For Animal Lovers (DVD release Nov 13, 2007). Upcoming productions include Biofuel My Ride, Burlesque Workout For Indie Rockers, and an as-yet untitled DVD about solutions for ne'er-do-wells to "green your home without losing your black heart." DiY-Fest Video is distributed by HALO 8 Entertainment.

== History ==
Founded by filmmaker Matt Pizzolo and organized by Kings Mob Productions, the festival initially launched as part of a “Do-it-Yourself Filmmaking Workshop” that Pizzolo and partner Katie Nisa ran after rough cut screenings of their cult movie “Threat.” The workshops were attended by a diverse, cross-subcultural audience largely from the independent film, digital hardcore, underground hip hop, hardcore punk, alternative media, and culture jamming scenes. Pizzolo observed that the DiY mediamakers shared a common ideology but developed their art in isolation from one another, so he expanded the workshop into the larger forum of DiY-Fest with the intention of engendering cross-subcultural DiY collaborations.

In 2001, Digital Hardcore Recordings released the fest-soundtrack CD “DiY-Fest” compiling spoken word clips from people such as Howard Zinn and Jello Biafra with underground music ranging from agit-prop folk musician Ani Difranco to hip hop artists The Arsonists. Standout tracks on the album included the original collaborations “43% Burnt [remix]” (math-rockers Dillinger Escape Plan with noise-artists Atari Teenage Riot) and “Ghetto Birds [remix]” (hip hop songstress Mystic with breakbeat diva Nic Endo) . These collaborations were conceived by Pizzolo, who was so pleased by the results that he used them as the template for the mash-up album “Threat: Music That Inspired The Movie.”

In late 2000, DiY-Fest was integrated into The Van’s Warped Tour with the hopes of exposing the underground mediamakers to a broader audience. The festival slowed down with intermittent bookings throughout 2002.

A legacy of DiY-Fest is the growth of alt porn. The organizers of DiY-Fest observed porn as being independent media and were among the first to recognize and include the gonzo, female-owned adult company Shane’s World as a DiY organization. DiY-Fest also hosted SuicideGirls at events when the site was still obscure, and, in a twist on the “Do it Yourself” theme, DiY-Fest partnered with female-owned sex shop Toys In Babeland to give away free vibrators at live events.

== Soundtrack ==
=== DiY-Fest (Audio CD) ===
A compilation of spoken word and underground music released by Digital Hardcore Recordings in January 2006.

==== Track listing ====
1. "Missing Press Conference" - George W. Bush
2. "Alleged Accused Reputed Reused" - Matt Pizzolo vs Alec Empire feat. Seth Tobocman & Jello Biafra
3. "Live At The Solidarity Conference" - Jello Biafra
4. "The Life" - Mystic
5. "43% Burnt [remix]" - Dillinger Escape Plan vs Atari Teenage Riot
6. "Live At The Solidarity Conference" - Howard Zinn
7. "Child Autonomous" - Creation Is Crucifixion
8. "White Collar Crime Fight Song" - White Collar Crime
9. "A Less Important Place (live acoustic)" - Miracle of 86
10. "Digital Skinhead" - Space Robot Scientists
11. "The Fight" - Hanin Elias
12. "Iris" - Nicole Blackman
13. "Fuel" - Ani Difranco
14. "Ghetto Birds [remix]" - Mystic vs Nic Endo
15. "Fellow Candymakers" - Sander Hicks vs The Heartworm
16. "No More Prisons" - William Upski Wimsatt
17. "The Show Must Go On" - D-Stroy
18. "One Fight" - Holocaust
19. "Kill Cupid With A Nail File" - The Icarus Line
20. "Live At The Solidarity Conference" - Safiya Asya Bukhari
21. "Threat" - Kings Mob Productions
22. "Bells I [Sci Fi Mix]" - Nic Endo
23. "Orgasm" - Ducky Doolittle with Jello Biafra

== DiY-Fest participants ==
=== Filmmakers ===
- Abel Ferrara
- Kings Mob Productions
- Matt Pizzolo
- Katie Nisa
- Lloyd Kaufman
- Jem Cohen
- Sarah Jacobson
- Harris Smith
- Esther Bell
- Shane's World
- Debbie Rochon
- Hook-Ups (“Destroying America”)
- Jim Jarmusch

=== Writers ===
- Howard Zinn
- Nicole Blackman
- Sander Hicks
- William Upski Wimsatt
- Cat Tyc
- Clamor Magazine

=== Activist Media ===
- CrimethInc.
- Zack Exley
- Safiya Asya Bukhari
- Independent Media Center
- PickAxe Productions
- Big Noise Films
- Fairness & Accuracy In Reporting
- Electronic Frontier Foundation
- Soft Skull Press

=== Performance Artists ===
- Jello Biafra
- Ducky Doolittle
- Radical Cheerleaders
- Kaiju Big Battel
- Aurora Cicero (tarot readings)

=== Illustrators/Photographers ===
- Seth Tobocman
- Jason Rose
- Buddyhead
- SuicideGirls

=== Musicians ===
- Kevin Devine
- Mystic
- Dillinger Escape Plan
- Atari Teenage Riot
- Creation Is Crucifixion
- White Collar Crime
- Miracle Of 86
- Space Robot Scientists
- Hanin Elias
- Ani Difranco
- D-Stroy
- Holocaust
- The Icarus Line
- Audiofile Collective
- Ian MacKaye
- Shipwreck
- Liars
- This Year's Model
