= Neil Gaiman: Dream Dangerously =

- Directed by: Patrick Meaney
- Produced by: Patrick Meaney; Mike Phillips; Jordan Rennert; Julian Darius; Cat Mihos; Morgan Peter Brown; Geoffrey Notkin
- Cinematography: Jordan Rennert
- Edited by: Patrick Meaney
- Music by: Precious Child
- Production companies: Sequart Organization, Respect! Films
- Distributed by: Vimeo
- Release date: July 2, 2016
- Running time: 74 minutes
- Country: United States
- Language: English

Neil Gaiman: Dream Dangerously is a documentary feature profiling the title subject, an English fantasy writer of prose and comics.

== Synopsis ==
The documentary follows Gaiman on his 2013 signing tour of the US and UK and also delves into his creative process and personal background. While dealing with the challenges of his extensive tour, he reflects on his youth, early creative success and the struggles of balancing creativity and life.It includes interviews with friends, artists, editors and other industry professionals.

== Background ==
Dream Dangerously is co-produced by Sequart and Respect Films. The film grew out of preview collaborations Grant Morrison: Talking With Gods and Warren Ellis: Captured Ghosts. The team felt that Gaiman would be a perfect subject for a next project. At the time, Gaiman was preparing for his final signing tour, which became one of the central subjects of the documentary.

Meaney and Rennert followed Gaiman on his tour in the US and through all of England. This footage became the spine of the film.

This material was supplemented with interviews with Gaiman's collaborators, like DC editor Karen Berger, author Terry Pratchett, as well as his friends and fans like Bill Hader, Michael Sheen, Geoffrey Notkin, and Lenny Henry.

== Release ==
The film was acquired for distribution by Vimeo, and released in July 2016. It is currently available on Vimeo on Demand and Starz. A Blu-Ray edition was released in September 2018 by Brink Vision.

== See also ==
- Dreams With Sharp Teeth
- She Makes Comics
