= Movie TV Tech Geeks =

Entertainment news website

- Website type: Digital media
- Available in: English
- Headquarters: New York, NY
- Owner: Indie Genius Productions
- Founder: Curt Johnson
- Website: movietvtechgeeks.com
- Commercial: No
- Launched: 2010
- Current status: Active

Movie TV Tech Geeks is an online entertainment news website which was launched in 2010. The site offers news in the field of television, films, video games, technology, politics, sports, and film theories. It was founded by Indie Genius Productions and is headquartered in New York, NY along with an office in St. Paul, MN. It is known for breaking Marvel Entertainment news stories along with extensive coverage of the WB show Supernatural.

Movie TV Tech Geeks has expanded its coverage with red-carpet events in Los Angeles, New York film festivals and San Diego Comic-Con panels where their images have been used by mainstream publications such as Entertainment Weekly and The Washington Post.

Writers for the news site have included Pace University Professor Larry Chiagouris, Ph.D. writing about technology along with West Chester University Professor Lynn S. Zubernis, Ph.D. who writes about fandom culture. Her latest book covered exclusively on Movie TV Tech Geeks is titled "There'll Be Peace When You Are Done: Actos and Fans Celebrate the Legacy of Supernatural" featured chapters from stars Jensen Ackles and Jared Padalecki.

In 2015, Movie TV Tech Geeks teamed up with North Shore Animal League America, the largest no-kill shelter in North America to bring attention to rescue animals from puppy mills and overcrowded shelters. Homeless animals were featured on the news site to help find them homes. In that year, the news site was nominated for three Izea Creators Choice Awards and won for Best Pop Culture News from breaking the Lamar Odom story that year.

In 2020, Movie TV Tech Geeks was awarded Best Technology & Entertainment News Platform by Corporate Vision Magazine. Award-winning filmmaker Curt Johnson, and producer of 2001's Academy Award-winning documentary Thoth and Your Mommy Kills Animals is the Editor-in-Chief and founder of the news site.
