= Patrick Meaney =

American film director

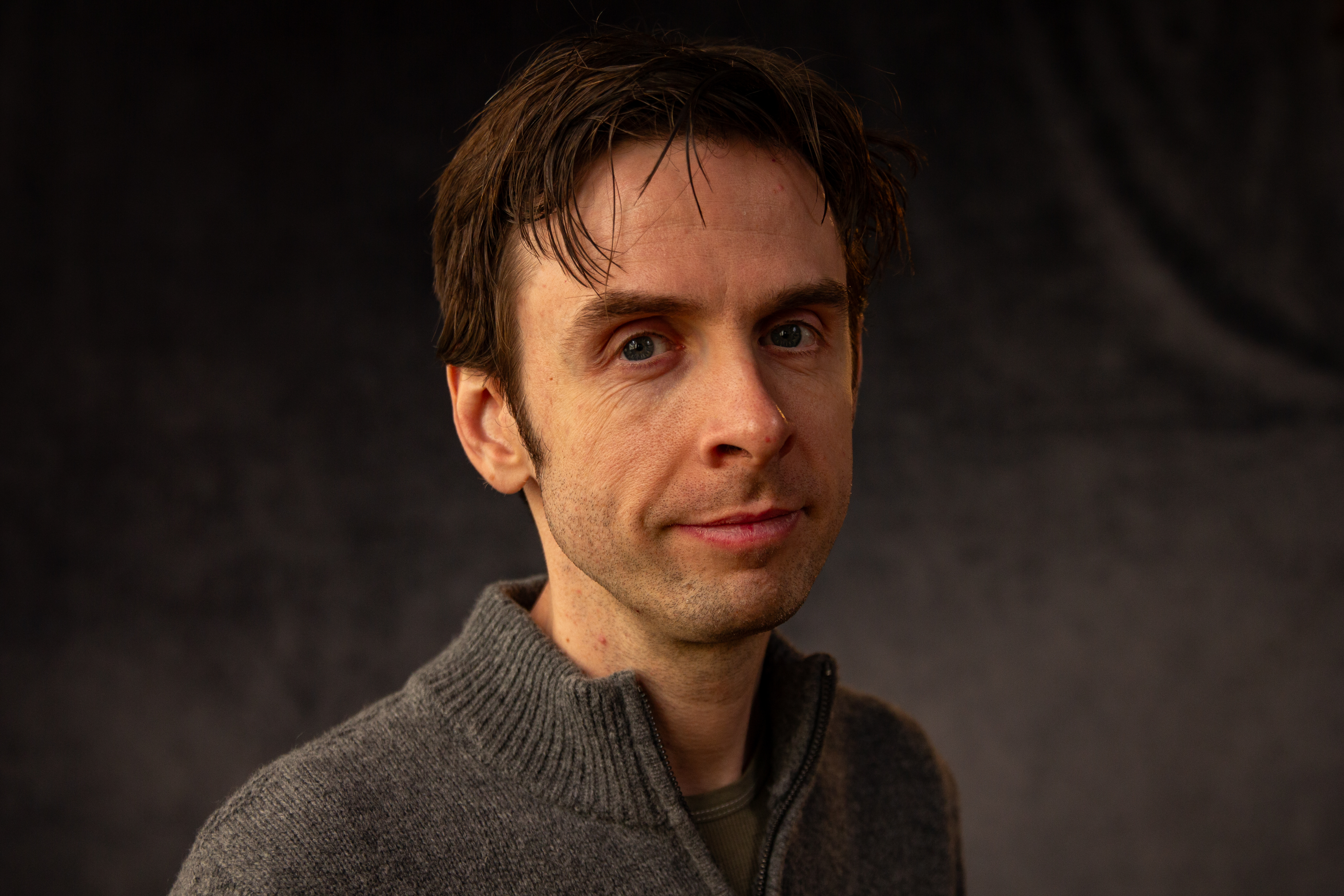
- Meaney at Sundance Film Festival 2025
- Born: Port Chester, New York, United States
- Occupations: Film director, screenwriter, comic book writer, producer, editor

Patrick Meaney is a film director, screenwriter, producer, comic book writer, and editor, best known for his work as a director of documentaries about the world of comics books, including Grant Morrison: Talking With Gods, Warren Ellis: Captured Ghosts, She Makes Comics and Neil Gaiman: Dream Dangerously. He also directed the horror film House of Demons, and his most recent film is the musical romance The Brink Of.

== Career ==
=== Grant Morrison: Talking With Gods ===
In 2008, Meaney was approached by Sequart to turn a series of blog posts about Grant Morrison's comic book series The Invisibles into a book. In the process of working on the book, they decided to approach Morrison with the idea of creating a documentary about his life and work. He agreed, and filming began in 2009. In 2010, the film was completed and picked up for distribution by Halo-8 Entertainment. The film received critical acclaim from outlets like Variety, Wired, and Attack of the Show.

=== Warren Ellis: Captured Ghosts ===
While completing filming on Grant Morrison: Talking With Gods, Meaney and Sequart began work on their next project, a documentary profile of Warren Ellis. The film was shot between 2010 and 2011, shooting with Ellis in London and picking up interviews in New York, Los Angeles and San Diego. The film featured numerous experimental interludes, including a muppet version of Ellis. Respect Films again partnered with Halo 8 to distribute and the film premiered at the Napa Valley Film Festival.

=== The Image Revolution, She Makes Comics and more ===
From 2012 to 2015, Meaney worked on several additional documentary projects for Sequart. The Image Revolution, which chronicles the tumultuous founding of iconic indie comics publisher Image Comics was acquired for distribution by Shout Factory in 2015, and released in January 2016. The film was praised by outlets like Latino Review, who called it "one of the best documentaries of the year". Concurrently, Meaney produced the documentary exploration of women in the comics industry, She Makes Comics, with director Marisa Stotter. The film was selected by the 2015 San Diego Comic-Con Film Festival, where it won the Best Documentary Award. The film was acquired for distribution by XLRator Media and was released in summer 2016.

As a director, he created the short form documentary, Comics in Focus: Chris Claremont's X-Men, which was expanded for feature release in 2018.

Meaney also contributed a short story, "The Green" to the Occupy Comics anthology, and reunited with editor Matt Pizzolo and Black Mask Studios for the four issue comic book miniseries Last Born, with artist Eric Zawadzki.

=== Neil Gaiman: Dream Dangerously ===
In 2016, Meaney completed a long in the works documentary on iconic fantasy author Neil Gaiman. The film chronicles Neil on his final signing tour, and explores Gaiman's passion for writing, as well as the challenges of balancing embracing the opportunities available to him as a successful writer and creating the stories that fans love. The film was released in July 2016 by Vimeo on Demand.

=== House of Demons ===
In 2018, Meaney released his first narrative film, House of Demons. The film follow fours estranged friends who spend a weekend in a remote cabin that used to be home to a Manson Family like cult. The film features numerous popular personalities from the geek world, and was acquired for distribution by Sony Home Entertainment/Smith Global Media.

In 2021, Meaney released Syphon, a comic book mini-series for Image Comics, co-written with Mohsen Ashraf. The series received positive reviews, and won the Ringo Award for fan-favorite hero.

In 2024, his film The Brink Of was released. This music romance featured seven original songs, and received a 100% rating on Rotten Tomatoes.

In 2026, his film The Vanishing Tour premiered at the Marina Del Rey Film Festival, where it won the Grand Prize for Best Feature. The film stars Mina Tobias, Ryan Lee, Nicolette Norgaard, Amber Benson, Brendan Wayne and Auden Wyle.

== Works ==
Documentaries

- Grant Morrison: Talking With Gods - Director/Producer/Editor (2010)
- Warren Ellis: Captured Ghosts - Director/Producer/Editor (2012)
- The Image Revolution - Director/Producer/Editor (2014)
- She Makes Comics- Producer/Co-Editor (2014)
- Comics in Focus: Chris Claremont's X-Men - Director/Producer/Editor (2014)
- Neil Gaiman: Dream Dangerously - Director/Producer/Editor (2016)
- Chris Claremont's X-Men - Director/Producer/Editor (2018)

Narrative Film

- House of Demons - Writer/Director/Producer/Editor (2018)
- The Brink Of - Writer/Director/producer/Editor (2024)

Comics

- Last Born - Writer (2014)
- Syphon - Co-Writer (2021)

Non-Fiction

- Our Sentence is Up: Seeing The Invisibles - Writer (2010)
