= Grant Morrison: Talking with Gods =

- Directed by: Patrick Meaney
- Produced by: Julian Darius; F. J. DeSanto; Patrick Meaney; Mike Phillips; Jordan Rennert; Amber Yoder
- Cinematography: Jordan Rennert
- Edited by: Patrick Meaney
- Production companies: Sequart Organization, Respect! Films
- Distributed by: Halo-8 Entertainment
- Release date: October 9, 2010
- Running time: 80 minutes
- Country: United States
- Language: English

Grant Morrison: Talking with Gods is a feature-length documentary that takes an in depth look at the life, career and mind of the Scottish comic book writer Grant Morrison. Talking with Gods features interviews with Morrison and many of their collaborators, such as artists, editors and other industry professionals.

== Background ==
Talking with Gods is the first documentary co-produced by Sequart and Respect Films. The film grew out of Our Sentence is Up: Seeing The Invisibles, a book-length exploration of Morrison's seminal comic book series. After completing the book, Sequart pitched Morrison on the idea of a documentary chronicling their life and work. They agreed, and filming began in April 2009. Over the next year, the filmmakers traveled to Los Angeles, New York, London and Glasgow to interview Morrison's friends and collaborators.

Among those interviewed are Executive Editor of DC Comics Dan DiDio, and Karen Berger - Executive Editor of DC Comics' Vertigo. Artists interviewed in the film include Phil Jimenez, Jill Thompson, Cameron Stewart, Frazer Irving, Steve Cook, and many others. The film also features interviews with Morrison's collaborators Geoff Johns and Mark Waid, as well as counterculture personalities like Richard Metzger and Douglas Rushkoff. The actress Amber Benson is interviewed briefly on the subject of Morrison's comic series, We3.

== Plot ==
The film tracks chronologically through Morrison's life, emphasizing the connections between their life and their writing. It follows Morrison's development from being a shy and sometimes depressed teenager with an obsession for comics, through their years of explosive self-realization in the 1990s, ultimately leading to a happy and well adjusted married life in Scotland contemplating the future.

== Release ==
News broke in July 2010 that indie film distributor Halo-8 Entertainment had picked up the film for a November 2010 release at New York Comic-Con, followed by a theatrical release run.

The film premiered to general critical acclaim. It is currently available on DVD, and was also free to stream via Hulu (in North America) and YouTube. The film was followed by a similarly themed documentary on Warren Ellis titled Warren Ellis: Captured Ghosts. The same team is currently working on The Image Revolution, a documentary history of Image Comics.

== See also ==
- The Mindscape of Alan Moore
- Warren Ellis: Captured Ghosts
- She Makes Comics
