= House of Demons =

- Directed by: Patrick Meaney
- Written by: Patrick Meaney
- Produced by: Patrick Meaney; Jordan Rennert; Jordan Byrne; Brian Townes; Amanda Sonnenschein
- Cinematography: Jordan Rennert
- Edited by: Patrick Meaney
- Music by: Field Observations
- Production company: Respect Films
- Distributed by: Smith Global Media
- Release date: February 6, 2018
- Running time: 90 minutes
- Country: United States
- Language: English

House of Demons is a 2018 American horror film directed and written by Patrick Meaney that follows four estranged friends who reunite to spend the weekend at a remote house that was once home to a Manson Family like cult. It stars Amber Benson, Kaytlin Borgen, Morgan Peter Brown, Taliesin Jaffe, Tiffany Smith, Jeff Torres, Whitney Moore and Dove Meir. The film was released on February 6, 2018, by Smith Global Media and Sony Home Entertainment.

== Plot ==
Gwen, Matthew, Katrina, and Spencer are best friends for years, until a terrible tragedy tears them apart, and leaves all of them in a state of arrested development. Years later, they are reunited for a destination wedding to stay together in a rented house. What they do not know is that in the late 60s, the house was home to a Manson Family-like cult, run by Frazer, a charismatic former scientist pushing the boundaries of human consciousness. His experiments echo through time and manifest everyone's darkest fears and memories before them as time blurs and Frazer's cult and the present day collide. Over the course of one night, everyone must confront their darkness or be destroyed by it.

== Cast ==
- Kaytlin Borgen as Gwen
- Morgan Peter Brown as Spencer
- Dove Meir as Frazer
- Whitney Moore as Katrina
- Tiffany Smith as Samantha
- Jeff Torres as Matthew
- Amber Benson as Maya
- Chloe Dykstra as Nancy
- Taliesin Jaffe as Dave
- Brian Townes as Derek
- Jeff Berg as Jeff
- Paradox Pollack as The Demon
- Alexia Dox as Dawn

== Production ==
The film was shot in 13 days, primarily in Santa Clarita, California. Meaney chose to cast many people who are prominent in the geek world, after developing those connections while producing documentaries about the world of comic books.

The film was originally called Trip House, but the title was subsequently changed to House of Demons.

== Release ==
The film was acquired for distribution by Smith Global Media and Sony Home Entertainment. It was released February 6, 2018 on DVD, VOD and digital.

In advance of the release, the film received positive reviews from Aint It Cool News, We The Nerdy, Unseen Films and other outlets.
