= Hollywood Residential =

American sitcom

- Genre: Sitcom
- Created by: Adam Paul
- Directed by: Cole Kennedy
- Starring: Adam Paul; Lindsey Stoddart; David Ramsey
- Country of origin: United States
- Original language: English
- No. of seasons: 1
- No. of episodes: 8

Production
- Executive producers: Andy Bobrow; Andy Lerner; Michael Ruggiero
- Producer: Sean K. Lambert
- Camera setup: Single-camera
- Running time: 26–30 minutes

Original release
- Network: Starz
- Release: January 23 – March 12, 2008

Hollywood Residential is an American sitcom created by and starring Adam Paul. It was originally broadcast on the Starz network in the United States in 2008.

Paul plays Tony King, an aspiring actor who had come up with an idea for a reality show in the style of This Old House in which each episode focused on his making improvements to the home of a Hollywood celebrity. Each episode featured a celebrity playing himself or herself.

Recurring themes include Tony's incompetence, his obsession with his ex-wife, and his simultaneous jealousy of and attraction for his co-host, Lila.

Tony's ex-wife Rachael was played by Rachael Harris. Adam Paul and Rachael Harris were married in real life and they divorced soon after the initial broadcast of Hollywood Residential.

== Cast ==
- Adam Paul as Tony King
- Lindsey Stoddart as Lila Mann
- David Ramsey as Don Merritt
- Eric Allan Kramer as Pete
- Carrie Clifford as Carrie
- Rachael Harris as Rachael
- Catherine Reitman as Abbey
- Melissa Bacelar as Scarlett Jo Ramson
- Patrick Gallo as Tom "The Hammer" Stern
- Kurt Fuller as Chet

== Episodes ==
No.	Title	Directed by	Written by	Celebrity guest	Original release date
1	"The Hotness"	Cole Kennedy	Adam Paul	Paula Abdul	January 23, 2008
2	"Where's Tom?"	Cole Kennedy	Adam Paul	Tom Arnold	January 30, 2008
Tom Arnold takes Tony out on a night of wild debauchery the night before the show is to be filmed at Arnold's house and the next day Arnold has disappeared, leaving Tony scrambling to find him.
3	"Dominion Day"	Cole Kennedy	Adam Paul	Carmen Electra	February 6, 2008
While filming at Carmen Electra's house, Tony accidentally injures Electra's beloved pet and sets of a public relations nightmare.
4	"Sauna"	Adam Glass	Adam Paul	Jamie Kennedy	February 13, 2008
When Tony finds out that his next project is at the home of Jamie Kennedy and that Kennedy is dating Tony's ex-wife, Tony decides to take revenge. Lila seems to be warming towards Tony in a romantic way.
5	"Awards Show"	Cole Kennedy	Adam Paul	Cheryl Hines	February 20, 2008
Tony is jealous when Cheryl Hines invites Lila to a fancy Hollywood event.
6	"Only Small Actors"	Cole Kennedy	Adam Paul	Chris Kattan	February 27, 2008
While filming an episode at Chris Kattan's house, Tony and Kattan hit it off and Kattan recommends Tony for a role in a movie, to Kattan's eventual regret.
7	"It Happens"	Cole Kennedy	Adam Paul	John Cho	March 5, 2008
Filming at John Cho's house becomes difficult when it is discovered that Cho's wife has given permission to the "MILF Queen" to film a porn movie on the same day.
8	"Lila's Party"	Andy Lerner	Adam Paul	Beverly D'Angelo	March 12, 2008
