= Warren Ellis: Captured Ghosts =

2011 American documentary film

- Directed by: Patrick Meaney
- Produced by: Julian Darius; F. J. DeSanto; Patrick Meaney; Mike Phillips; Jordan Rennert
- Cinematography: Jordan Rennert
- Edited by: Patrick Meaney
- Production companies: Sequart Organization, Respect! Films
- Distributed by: Halo-8 Entertainment
- Release date: 2011
- Running time: 79 minutes
- Country: United States
- Language: English

Warren Ellis: Captured Ghosts is a feature-length documentary by Patrick Meaney that takes an in depth look at the life, career and mind of the British comic book writer Warren Ellis. The film combines extensive interviews with Ellis with insights from his colleagues and friends, as well as ambient visual re-creations of his prose and comics work.

== Background ==
Captured Ghosts is a co-production of Sequart Organization and Respect! Films, the follow-up to their documentary Grant Morrison: Talking with Gods. As Talking with Gods was drawing to a close, the filmmakers considered various subjects for a follow-up, but ultimately chose to focus on Ellis, due to the strength of his body of work and the mystique surrounding him as a personality.

Production on the film began with a two-day interview with Ellis in a London hotel room in March 2010. Shooting continued until October 2011 in New York, Los Angeles, Leeds, London and San Diego. Among those interviewed are comics industry notables Joe Quesada, Matt Fraction, Jason Aaron, Ellis's collaborators Darick Robertson, Phil Jimenez, Cully Hamner and Ben Templesmith, and more. The film also features a wide variety of cross media Ellis collaborators and friends including Joss Whedon, Helen Mirren, Wil Wheaton, Patton Oswalt, Stoya, Zoetica Ebb, and more.

== Plot ==
The film tracks chronologically through Ellis's life, as he moves from an unruly teenager to a successful writer and internet icon. The film features numerous interludes in which Ellis reads from his works. Thematically, the film is concerned with the construction of futures, and the way that science fiction can influence reality.

== Reality ==
The film premiered at 2011's inaugural Napa Valley Film Festival. A DVD release through Halo-8 Entertainment followed in 2012. It is currently available on DVD and download.

== See also ==
- Grant Morrison: Talking with Gods
- The Mindscape of Alan Moore
- She Makes Comics
