= Tiffany Smith =

American actress (born 1982)

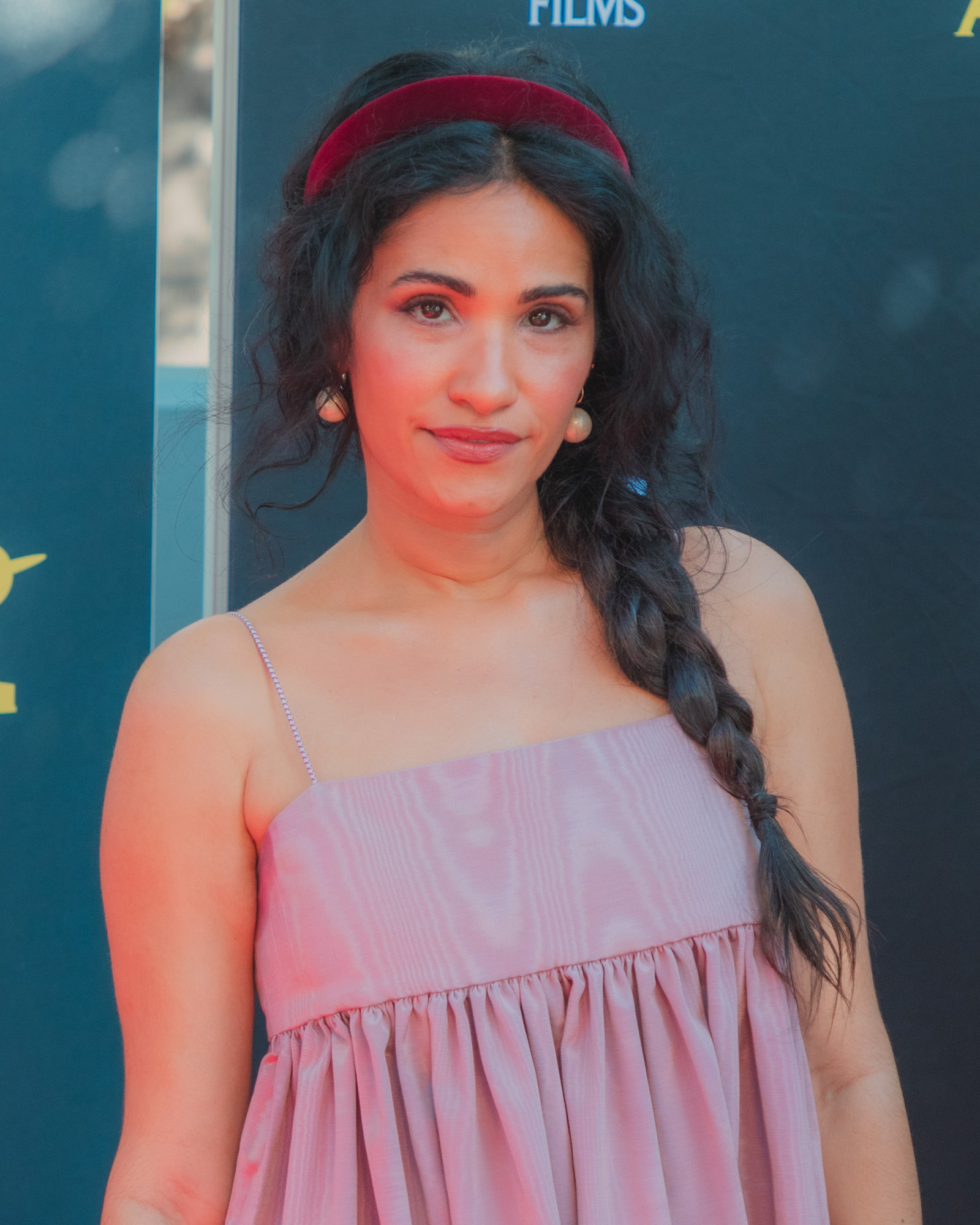
- Smith in 2026
- Born: Tiffany Marie Smith; November 29, 1982 (age 43); Santa Monica, California, U.S.
- Education: Syracuse University (S.I. Newhouse School of Public Communications)
- Occupations: Actress, host, writer, producer
- Years active: 2007–present
- Known for: Harry & Meghan: Becoming Royal, Supernatural, Jane the Virgin, Masters of the Universe: Revelation
- Notable work: Guardians of the Galaxy Vol. 3, Vice, Lego DC Super-Villains (voice of Hawkgirl)
- Spouse: David Smith (married 2003)

Tiffany Marie Smith (born 1982) is an American actress known for portraying Meghan Markle in the 2019 film Harry & Meghan: Becoming Royal, among other roles. She is also known for work on TV shows such as Supernatural, Jane the Virgin, the voice of Andra in Masters of the Universe: Revelation, and films such as Vice and Guardians of the Galaxy Vol. 3. Tiffany has also done voicework as Hawkgirl in Lego DC Super-Villains video game.

== Biography ==
Tiffany Smith was born in Santa Monica, California, and has been passionate about acting since childhood. She took an acting class and began her initial career as a theater artist. She made her acting debut in the 2007 TV series, The Daily Byte. She later became known as a correspondent and host for television programs such as Attack of the Show and CW FanTalk discussing the 2014 TV series The Flash. Other television credits include Supernatural, and NCIS: Los Angeles.

She married writer David Smith in 2003.

== Career ==
She was the producer and writer of the television series Cuz and Weird Weird Times.

== Works ==
- Geeking Out (2016)
- Con Man (2017)
- Jane the Virgin (2017)
- Dungeons & Flagons (2018)
- House of Demons (2018)
- Vice (2018)
- Gears 5 (2019)
- Always a Sword: A Sword & Sorcery Adventure (2019)
- Into the Dark (2020)
- My Valentine (2020)
- Masters of the Universe: Revelation (2021)
- Aloha with Love (2022)
- Shark Side of the Moon (2022)
- The Immaculate Room (2022)
- Guardians of the Galaxy Vol 3 (2023)
- Splinter (2023)
- Trapped in the Cabin (2023)
- Quantum Leap (2023)
- Masters of the Universe: Revolution (2024)
- Landman (2024)
- Masters of the Universe: Andra (2025)

== See also ==
- Masters of the Universe: Revelation
