= Comics in Focus: Chris Claremont's X-Men =

2018 film by Patrick Meaney

Chris Claremont's X-Men
- Film poster
- Directed by: Patrick Meaney
- Produced by: Patrick Meaney; Jordan Rennert
- Starring: Chris Claremont
- Release date: October 14, 2013
- Running time: 71 minutes

Chris Claremont's X-Men is a documentary focusing on comic book writer Chris Claremont's run writing The X-Men from 1975 to 1991. The film features interviews with Claremont himself as well as members of his creative team, including editors Louise Simonson and Ann Nocenti, artist Art Adams, and former Marvel Comics Editor-in-Chief Jim Shooter.

== Background ==
Chris Claremont's X-Men is a co-production between Respect! Films and Sequart Organization, directed by Patrick Meaney, produced by Meaney and Jordan Rennert, and executive produced by Julian Darius and Mike Phillips. On November 7, 2011, the filmmakers launched a Kickstarter campaign to fund the film. By December 7, 2011, the project had surpassed its initial goal of $3,500 to reach $4,131 at the campaign's end.

== Plot ==
The film is an in-depth look at Claremont's run on The X-Men (later The Uncanny X-Men) series, which he wrote from 1975 to 1991. In interviews with Claremont, Simonson, Nocenti, Adams, and Shooter, the film tells the story of how Claremont's writing revived Marvel's failing X-Men title and rebuilt it into a successful franchise. Chris Claremont's X-Men explores Claremont's contributions to the X-Men, including his development of popular characters Wolverine, Phoenix, and Storm.

== Release ==
Chris Claremont's X-Men premiered on October 14, 2013, in New York City and was released on May 13, 2014, through Vimeo on Demand and DVD.

The film was subsequently expanded into a feature-length version that was released on February 6, 2018, by XLRator Media, which added material about the X-Men films, as well as more background on Claremont's life before writing X-Men.
