= Yoga for Indie Rockers =

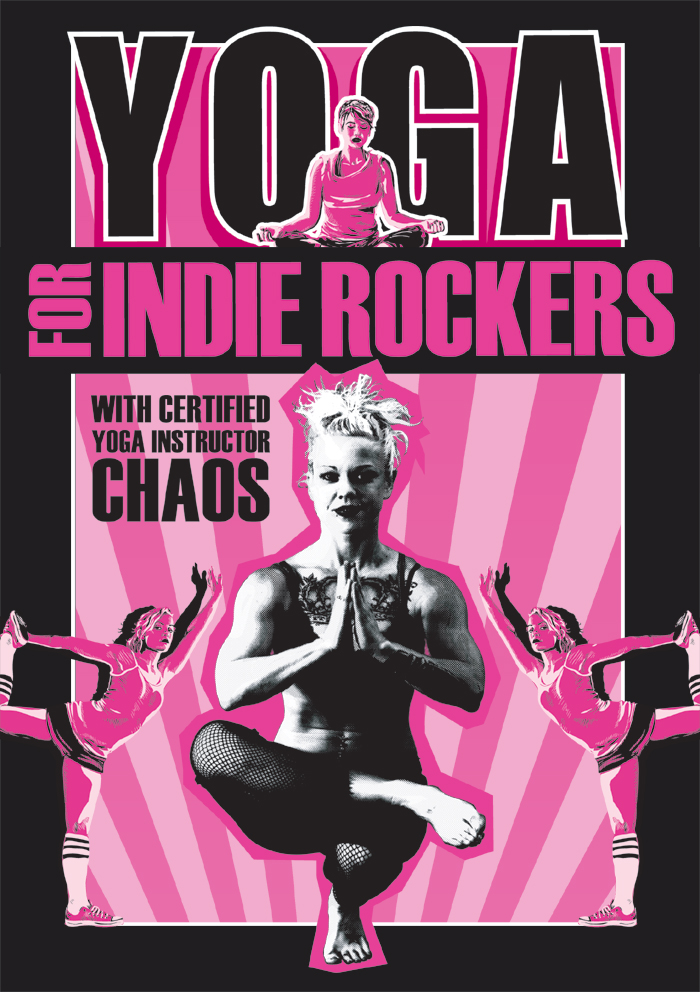
- DVD box. Designed by Robert Anthony Jr. Photos by Daniel Giberson, Carlos Batts.
- Directed by: Brandi Krieger
- Starring: Chaos; Page Turner; Karri Langlois; Kristina Sefeldt
- Distributed by: HALO 8 Entertainment
- Release date: October 30, 2007
- Running time: 45 minutes
- Country: United States
- Language: English

Yoga For Indie Rockers is a fitness video that matches a traditional yoga workout with contemporary indie rock music and attitude.

The DVD features certified yoga instructor Chaos running a hardbody yoga workout with three students: Page Turner (advanced), Karri Langlois (beginner), and Kristina Sefeldt (intermediate). The DVD also features a Beginner's Session and three audio "channels" of musical soundscapes: indie, pop-punk, and electro.

The DVD was released on October 30, 2007 by HALO 8 Entertainment. Its sister release Pilates For Indie Rockers was released on November 13, 2007.

== Track listing ==
=== Music Channel 1 ===
1. From The Bottom Of This Bottle - Crash Romeo (opening sequence)
2. People Are So Fickle - Kevin Devine
3. It Could Be Easy - House of Fools
4. Space Invaders - Knifeyhead
5. Apocalypse Blaze - The PoPo
6. Going Nowhere - modwheelmood
7. City Of Echoes - Pelican
8. No Girl In My Plan - Two Lone Swordsmen
9. Shooting The Breeze With An Air Rifle - The Stay Lows
10. Unretrofied - The Dillinger Escape Plan
11. Wisdom 05 - Enduser (closing meditation)

=== Music Channel 2 ===
1. Running Out Of Time - Roses Are Red
2. Glass Figurines - DoubleheadeR
3. We Declare War - Hello Nurse
4. Heading West - Crash Romeo
5. Ultra High - Paulson
6. Kiss The Wake - Criteria
7. New Man - Alec Empire
8. Black Picket Fences - Novemberkills
9. Stepping Stone - Jet Lag Gemini
10. Sea Legs - Ladyfinger
11. Once We Had A Word For This - Sorry About Dresden

=== Music Channel 3 ===
1. On A Bus In Brighton - Enduser
2. Flexture - Edgey
3. Pericardial Space - Stephen James Knight
4. G.H.U. - Defragmentation
5. Cavity - Edgey
6. Lighter Days - Stephen James Knight
7. Path Of Violence - Enduser
