= Pilates for Indie Rockers =

Pilates For Indie Rockers
- DVD box. Designed by Robert Anthony Jr. Photos by Daniel Giberson.
- Directed by: Brandi Krieger
- Starring: Chaos, Page Turner
- Distributed by: HALO 8 Entertainment
- Release date: November 13, 2007
- Running time: 45 minutes
- Country: United States
- Language: English

Pilates For Indie Rockers is a fitness video that matches a traditional pilates workout with contemporary indie rock music and attitude.

The DVD features certified yoga instructor Chaos running a mat-style pilates workout with the assistance of Page Turner, who demonstrates the beginner moves. The DVD also features a Beginner's Session and three audio "channels" of musical soundscapes: pop-punk, indie, and heavy.

The DVD is slated for a November 13, 2007 nationwide release by HALO 8 Entertainment. Its sister-release Yoga For Indie Rockers was released on October 30, 2007.

== Track listing ==
=== Music Channel 1 ===
1. From The Bottom Of This Bottle – Crash Romeo
2. Catastrophe – Deciding Tonight
3. Run This city – Jet Lag Gemini
4. We Want Guarantees, Not Hunger Pains – Closure In Moscow
5. Last One To Know – Hello Nurse
6. You Can Wake Up Now – Disarming Arctica
7. Glass Figurines – DoubleheadeR
8. Too Late For Us – BEDlight For BlueEYES
9. Giving It All Tonight – Roses Are Red
10. Last Day Of Winter – Pelican (closing meditation)

=== Music Channel 2 ===
1. Beds and Lawns – Sorry About Dresden
2. Damage Done – Veruca Salt
3. Please Fire Me – The Icarus Line
4. Kiss The Haze – House of Fools
5. Glories Yesterday – Two Lone Swordsmen
6. Lady Faire – The Cassettes
7. Run Together – Criteria
8. Radar – Radio Vago

=== Music Channel 3 ===
1. Dangerous – The End
2. TwentyXXSeven – Bring Out Your Dead
3. Setting Fire To Sleeping Giants – The Dillinger Escape Plan
4. Permanence – This Is Hell
5. Hunt You Down – Alec Empire
6. Who Believes Enough? – Ladyfinger
7. Stalwart Carapace – Edgey
