= Ramzi Abed =

American film director

- Born: March 5, 1973 (age 52)
- Occupation: Film director

Ramzi Abed (was born on March 5, 1973) is the founder of Bloodshot Pictures and also the founding member of the electronic group, Elektracity. He is a Palestinian-American visual artist, performer and filmmaker known for The Tunnel (2001), Waking (1999) and Telephone World (2013). He works out of both Falls Church, Virginia and Los Angeles, California.

== Film career ==
His early short film The Tunnel was screened at the Deep Ellum and TromaDance film festivals in 2001 and 2002 respectively. Abed's projects include Upside Downtown, starring Masuimi Max, and The Devil's Muse, based on the unsolved murder of Elizabeth Short known as the "Black Dahlia murder". The Devil's Muse marked his first collaboration with David J, who created the original score and soundtrack for the film. The Devil's Muse was released digitally by Cinetic Media and theatrically and on DVD by HALO 8 Entertainment. His English- and Hebrew-language feature film In A Spiral State was released theatrically and on DVD through HALO 8 on September 29, 2009. His documentary on avant-garde erotica, The New Erotic was released in the spring of 2011. His film Midnight 2020 starring James Duval and Twink Caplan was released in 2016.

== Music career ==
Abed is a founding member of the electronic group, Elektracity known for their improvisation and layered sound effects. Other members include make-up artist and fashion designer Amanda Staggs and producer/actor, Eric Fleming.

== Filmography ==
- 1998: Nobody (short)
- 1999: Waking (short)
- 2000: The Interview (documentary short)
- 2001: The Tunnel (short)
- 2003: Clay Fields (documentary)
- 2003: Shortkutz Vol. IV (video short)
- 2005: Upside Downtown
- 2006: Black Dahlia Movie (documentary)
- 2007: The Devil's Muse
- 2009: Kelly Deerdale, Naturist (video short)
- 2009: In a Spiral State
- 2011: The New Erotic: Art Sex Revolution (documentary)
- 2012: Telephone World
- 2012: Nerdy Girls (credited as MR. E)
- 2016: Midnight 2020
