= Ducky DooLittle =

American sex educator and writer

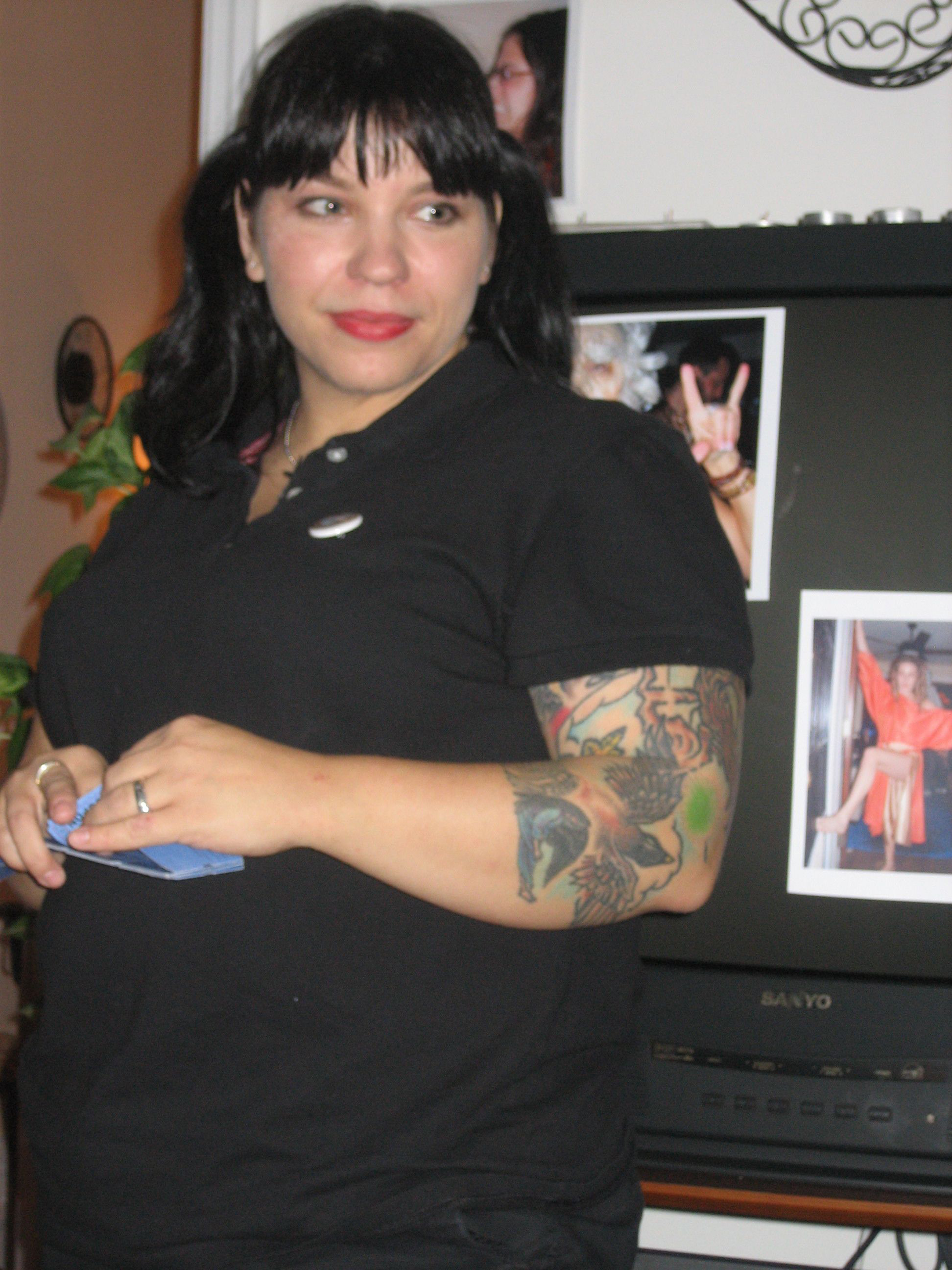
- Ducky DooLittle in 2006.
- Born: June 3, 1970 (age 56); Fridley, Minnesota
- Occupations: sex educator; performer; writer; former peepshow girl; sexual assault and violence intervention counselor
- Notable work: Sex with the Lights On: 200 Illuminating Sex Questions Answered

Ducky DooLittle (born June 3, 1970, in Fridley, Minnesota) is a sex educator, performer, writer, former peepshow girl, and sexual assault and violence intervention counselor in the New York City area. She is the author of the book Sex with the Lights On: 200 Illuminating Sex Questions Answered (ISBN 0-7867-1680-0).

== Career ==
DooLittle began her career as a peepshow girl in New York's Times Square in the 1980s. Her sex work developed into a successful career as a sex journalist for fashion and men's magazines. DooLittle spent three years working on staff as a sex educator with the feminist sex toys store Babeland, holding the position of Education Coordinator and Lead Workshop Facilitator. She has trained with Planned Parenthood in comprehensive STD prevention and sex education.

DooLittle frequently speaks at universities. Past appearances have included Antioch College, Barnard College, Columbia University, Harvard University, Mount Sinai School of Medicine, New York Institute of Technology, New York University, Pace University, Sarah Lawrence College, Stony Brook University, University of California, Riverside, University of Michigan, Vassar College, Wesleyan University, SUNY Purchase, and Western Washington University.

She has appeared on Day to Day (NPR), Sex Bytes (HBO), Countdown with Keith Olbermann (MSNBC), Sexcetera (Playboy TV), Behind Closed Doors (Playboy TV), and Howard Stern (E!). In 2001 DooLittle worked as a consulting sex expert for The Learning Channel's Sex in the New Century (ABC News Productions). In 2000 she was the writer and host of 60 episodes of Fresh Advice, a sex advice show for women (Pseudo Programs, Inc). She has been featured in publications such as The Village Voice, Spin, Details, The New York Times, The New Yorker, Penthouse, Marie Claire, and Mademoiselle.

== Charity work ==
Because of her mother's mental illness, DooLittle entered foster care as a teenager; today, she is working to raise awareness of conditions for foster children:

[M]y real goal is to use my story as an avenue to bring light to the fact that nearly half of all foster kids become homeless once they turn 18 years old. I want to start a movement to revamp the foster care system in America. I want to tell other current and former foster kids that they are not alone. It’s big. This is my purpose.
