= Steve Rubel =

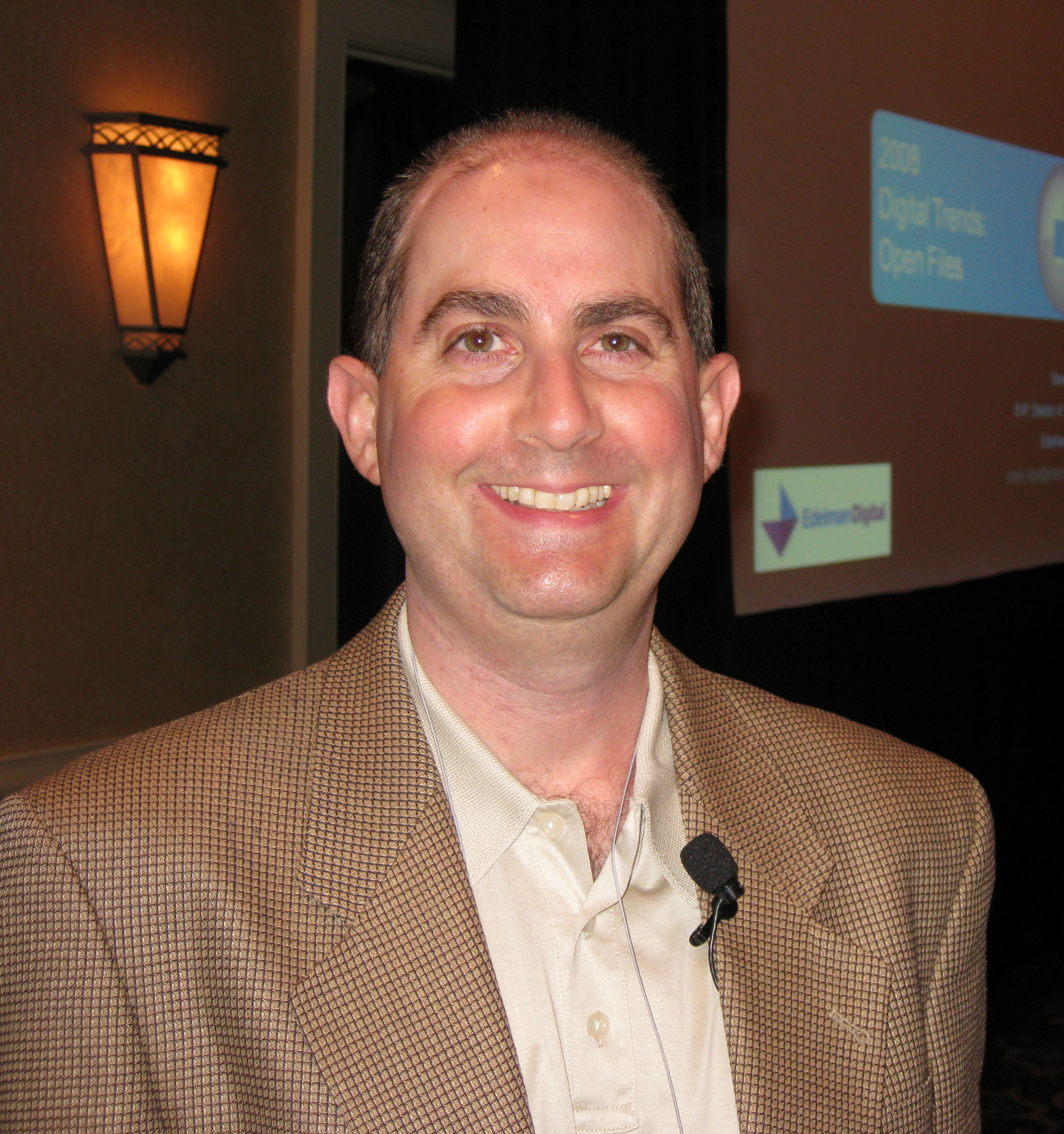
- Steve Rubel, 2008
- Born: United States
- Known for: Public relations, blogger

Steve Rubel is a public relations executive and professional blogger. While with the firm CooperKatz & Co., he advised clients on using blogs in their business strategy and started his own blog, Micro Persuasion, in 2004. The focus of his blog is the effect of blogging on the public relations industry.

Rubel moved to the Edelman public relations firm in February 2006, to help it use blogs more effectively. The firm later came under criticism when one of its clients, Walmart, helped pay for a couple to blog their cross-country RV trip on which they parked at local Wal-Marts. The blog, "Wal-Marting Across America", was quite favorable towards Wal-Mart, but the extent of the financial support was not fully disclosed (any RV can park overnight for free at Wal-Mart, but the company also paid for renting the couple's RV, along with gas and other fees). As the firm's blogging expert, Rubel was a focus of some of the criticism, but he said he was not personally involved in the project. On March 7, 2008, Rubel was interviewed on the WBGO program Conversations with Allan Wolper. He explained how blogs are now a part of the political game.
