= John Frank Rosenblum =

American film producer

- Born: United States
- Occupations: Film producer, screenwriter, actor

John Frank Rosenblum (born 1970), is an American film producer, screenwriter, and actor.

He is an internationally recognized expert on motion picture trailers. On September 7, 2006, eNewsChannels reported that he had "exited Lighthouse Productions after fifteen years as a producer to become a partner at Epic Level Entertainment."

Rosenblum is a graduate of the School of Cinematic Arts, University of Southern California and the Darlington School. In 1980, he acquired the license from BBC Enterprises, Ltd to market their television programs to American audiences, and has appeared as on-air talent and ran fan communications, in conjunction with another BBC licensee, Lionheart Television. In 1985, Rosenblum began producing local and national public broadcasting fund raising programming for such BBC programs as Doctor Who, EastEnders, and Red Dwarf.

In 1987, he was given recognition by Public Television for having raised over $1,000,000 for local public broadcasting stations.

Rosenblum is a member of the Producers Guild of America (Producer Council), Screen Actors Guild, Hollywood Branch, and Academy of Television Arts & Sciences (Producer Branch).

== Filmography ==
=== Motion pictures produced ===
- Charlie Says (IFC Films)
- Dragonlance: Dragons of Autumn Twilight (Paramount)
- Adventures of Johnny Tao: Rock Around the Dragon (Epic Level Entertainment)
- The Gamers: Dorkness Rising (Dead Gentlemen Productions)
- Dungeons & Dragons: Wrath of the Dragon God (Warner Brothers)
- The Gamers (Dead Gentlemen Productions)
- Orgazmo (October Films)
- Cannibal: The Musical (Troma)
- Impostor (Miramax/Dimension)
- Mimic (Miramax/Dimension)
- Anything Once (Aeberhard Productions) — award winning festival short

=== Television programs produced ===
- Astrobirdz (Bill Cobb Productions)
- Trailer Park (Sci-Fi Channel)
- Super Structures of The World (The Learning Channel)
- Wonders of the World (The Discovery Channel)
- Modern Marvels (The History Channel)
- South Park (Comedy Central)
- Red Dwarf (Universal Studios)

=== Mobisodes produced ===
- Xombie (Epic Level Entertainment)
- Loverboy (Lighthouse Productions)
- Digital Access (Warner Bros.)
- The Business (CrapTV).

=== Consulted for or written ===
- The Big Breakfast
- Dame Edna's Neighbourhood Watch

=== Publications ===
- M.I.T.H. - Operation Smoking Jaguar (Epic Level Entertainment)
- 30 Years of Adventure: A Celebration of Dungeons & Dragons (Wizards of The Coast)
