= $30 Film School =

Book by Michael W. Dean

$30 Film School is a book written by Michael W. Dean on how to make films on a limited budget, and is part of the $30 School book series which includes $30 Music School and $30 Writing School. Like the other books of this series, $30 Film School advocates a start-to-finish DIY ethic, and includes interviews with professionals in the given field, as well as a CD or DVD of extras.

The second edition was released in March 2006, and included a DVD featuring software, tutorials, and 14 short films by graduates of the first edition. The book is used in college and university media courses on filmmaking, such as Humanistinen Ammattikorkeakoulu (university of applied sciences) in Finland,

It was reported that at age 9, and by following instructions in the book, filmmaker Emma Kenney created the film The New Girl in Town which was shown at New Jersey International Film Festival.
