= Threat (film) =

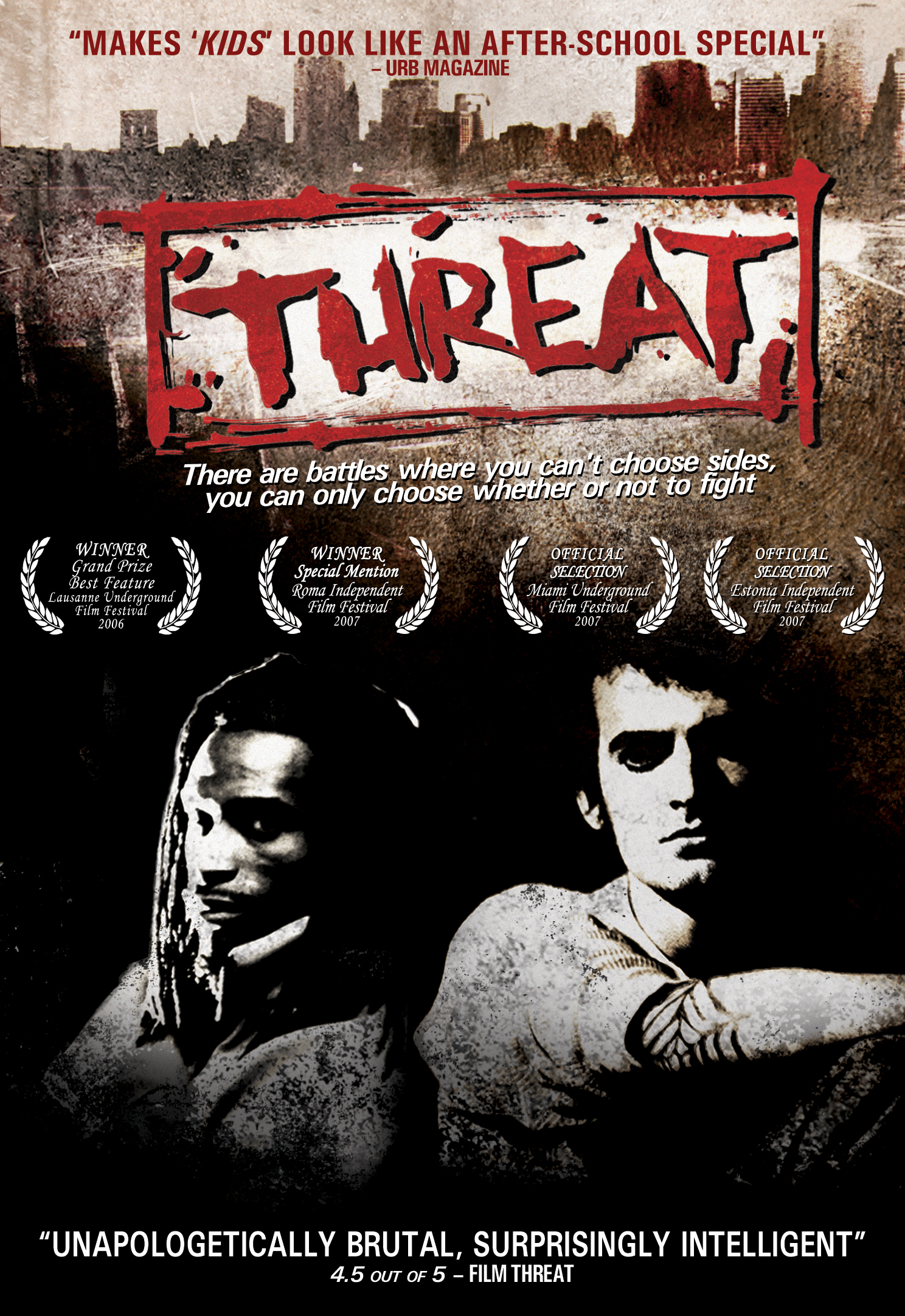
- DVD box. Designed by Robert Anthony Jr. Photos: James Dimaculangan, Jason Rose.
- Directed by: Matt Pizzolo
- Written by: Matt Pizzolo; Katie Nisa
- Produced by: Katie Nisa
- Starring: Carlos Puga; Keith Middleton; Rebekka Takamizu; Katie Nisa; Kamouflage; Neil Rubenstein; David R. Fisher; Tony Dreannan; Justin Brannan
- Cinematography: Benjamin Brancato
- Edited by: Brian Giberson
- Music by: Alec Empire; Atari Teenage Riot; queque; EC8OR; Bomb20; Most Precious Blood; Terror; Eighteen Visions; Bleeding Through
- Production company: Kings Mob Productions
- Distributed by: Sony Pictures; RED Music; HIQI Media; Gravitas Ventures; Halo 8 Entertainment
- Release dates: January 8, 1999 (CBGB, New York City); January 21, 1999 (Park City, Utah); October 13, 2000 (London, UK); January 20, 2006 (US)
- Running time: 91 minutes
- Country: United States
- Language: English

Threat (1999, 2006) is an independent film about a straightedge "hardcore kid" and a hip hop revolutionary whose friendship is doomed by the intolerance of their respective street tribes. It is an ensemble film of kids and young adults living in the early-to-mid-90s era of New York City's all-time highest ever murder rate, each of them suffering from a sense of doom brought on by dealing with HIV, racism, sexism, class struggle, and general nihilism.

The intellectual issues are played out amid an aesthetic of raw ultraviolence that has earned director Matt Pizzolo both accolades and condemnations (such as Film Threat's rave review stating "great art should assail the status quo, and that is what Pizzolo and Nisa's film has skillfully accomplished" in contrast to Montreal Film Journal's scathing review saying the film "openly glorifies murderous revolt").

Threat has been called a cult-classic and a "punk classic," winning multiple film festival awards, and touring punk and hip-hop venues across the U.S. and Europe, including over 100 dates on the Van's Warped Tour. Threat garnered a theatrical release and wide distribution after its appearance at Coachella.

Unlike past urban dramas, the film does not outright condemn its characters' violent outbursts. Although it does show harsh consequences for acts of violence, numerous critics have pointed out that it is unclear whether or not the film intends to glorify violence and/or class conflict.

== Summary ==
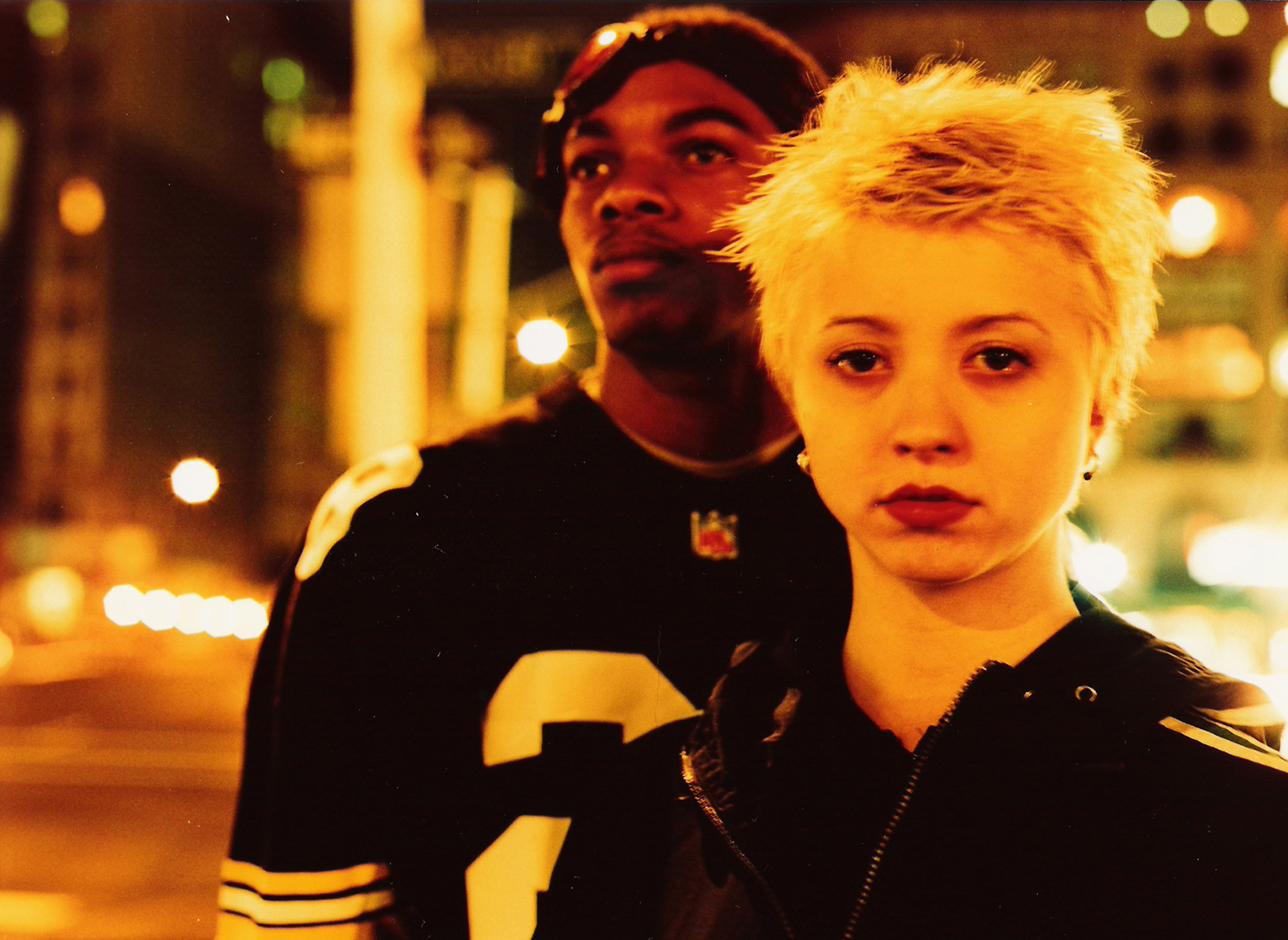
Kamouflage, Katie Nisa in Threat

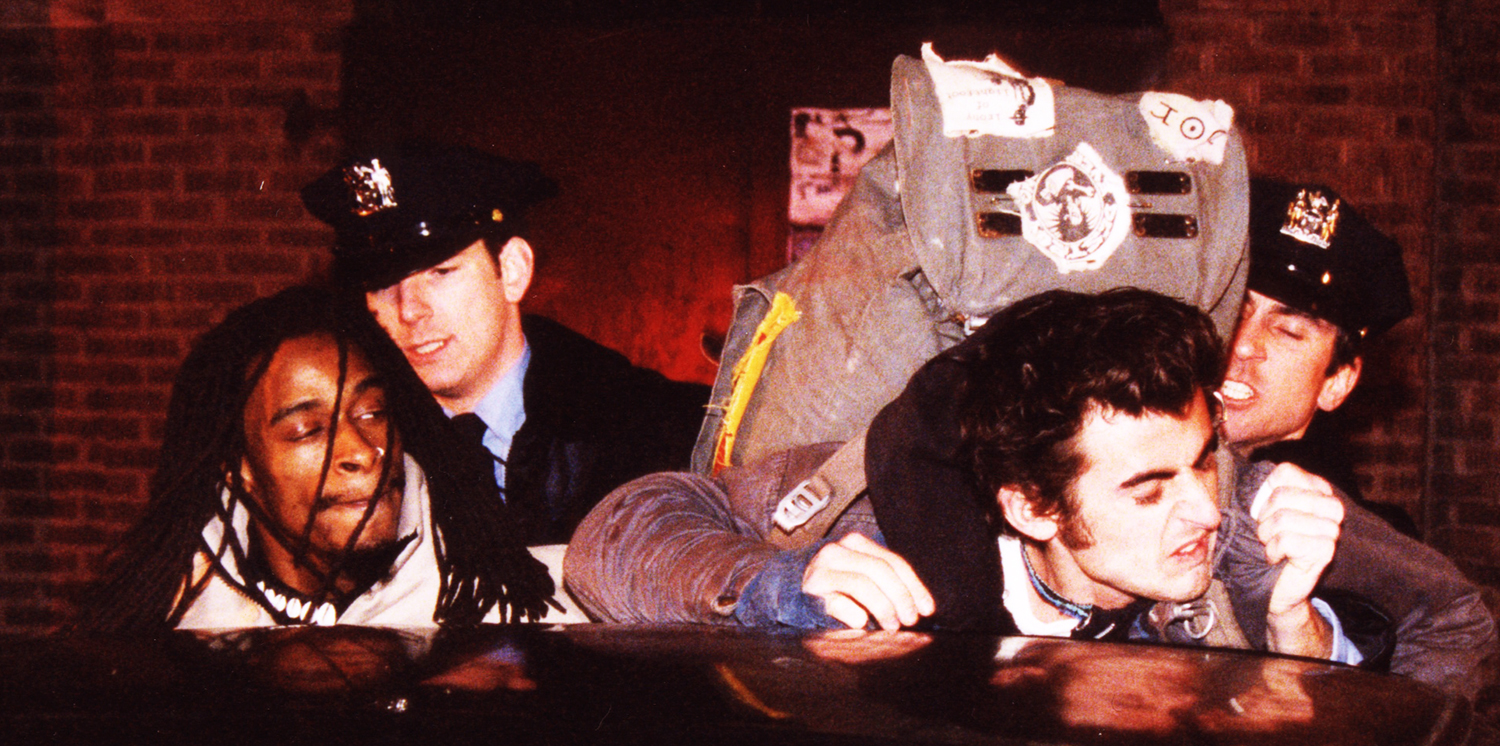
Keith Middleton, Carlos Puga, Mark Hartmann, Ryan O'Connell in Threat

White, straight edge hardcore kid, Jim (Carlos Puga), and black, hip-hop radical, Fred (Keith Middleton), become friends living on New York's Lower East Side - both of them with the hope that their newfound brotherhood will bring solidarity to their disparate communities. Instead, the alliance triggers a violent race riot that spills into the city streets with devastatingly tragic consequences.

== Cast ==
- Carlos Puga as Jim
- Keith Middleton as Fred
- Rebekka Takamizu as Mekky
- Kamouflage as Desmond
- Katie Nisa as Kat
- Neil Rubenstein as Ruby
- David R. Fisher as Marco
- Tony Dreannan as Tony
- Rachel Rosen as Punk Rock Girl
- Slug as Slug

== Production ==
The film was produced by Kings Mob, a team of neophyte filmmakers in their late teen and early 20s. Director Matt Pizzolo was the eldest member of the crew: 19 years old when he wrote the script and 21 when shooting commenced. Pizzolo met filmmaking partner Katie Nisa at NYU's Tisch School of the Arts. Both were enrolled in the school's Dramatic Writing Program. Pizzolo left the program and lived out of a backpack in Manhattan's Lower East Side while writing the first draft of Threat.

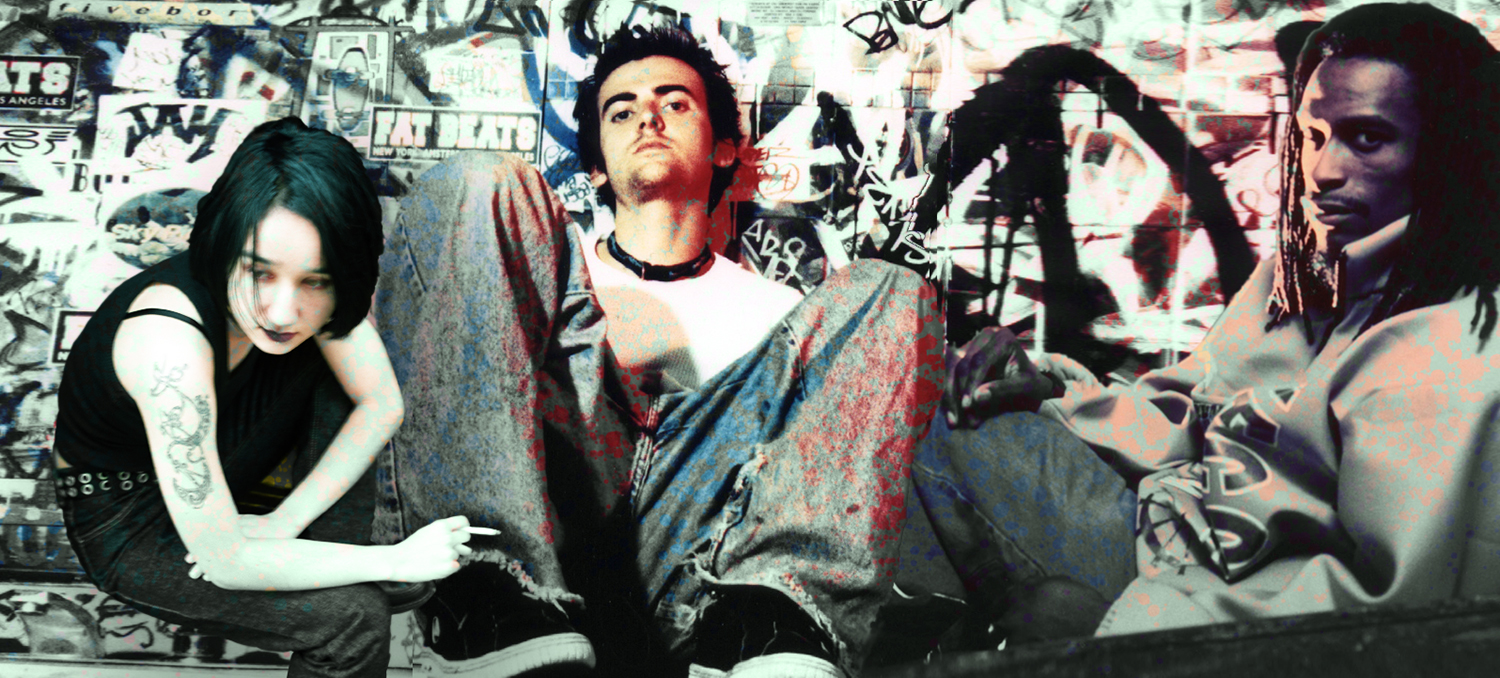
Rebekka Takamizu, Carlos Puga, Keith Middleton in Threat

Still at NYU, Nisa recruited film student Benjamin Brancato to join the project as cinematographer and NYU business school student Carlos Puga to play the lead role. Pizzolo recruited fellow Long Island native Ben Knight who was still a teenager at the time and put him to work as a production designer for the film. Nisa also cast Keith Middleton when she saw him walking on St. Mark's Place. Unknown to Nisa, Middleton was on his way to perform in the popular dance show Stomp.

Kings Mob shot the film in a DIY style that sharply contrasted with other more polished independent films of the mid 90s (sometimes referred to as Indiewood). The DIY style focused less on aesthetic and more on authenticity. This style later picked up traction with various DiY-Video movements including the mumblecore scene of the 2000s. Unlike most movies of the DIY-Video era to follow, Threat was shot on 16 mm film.

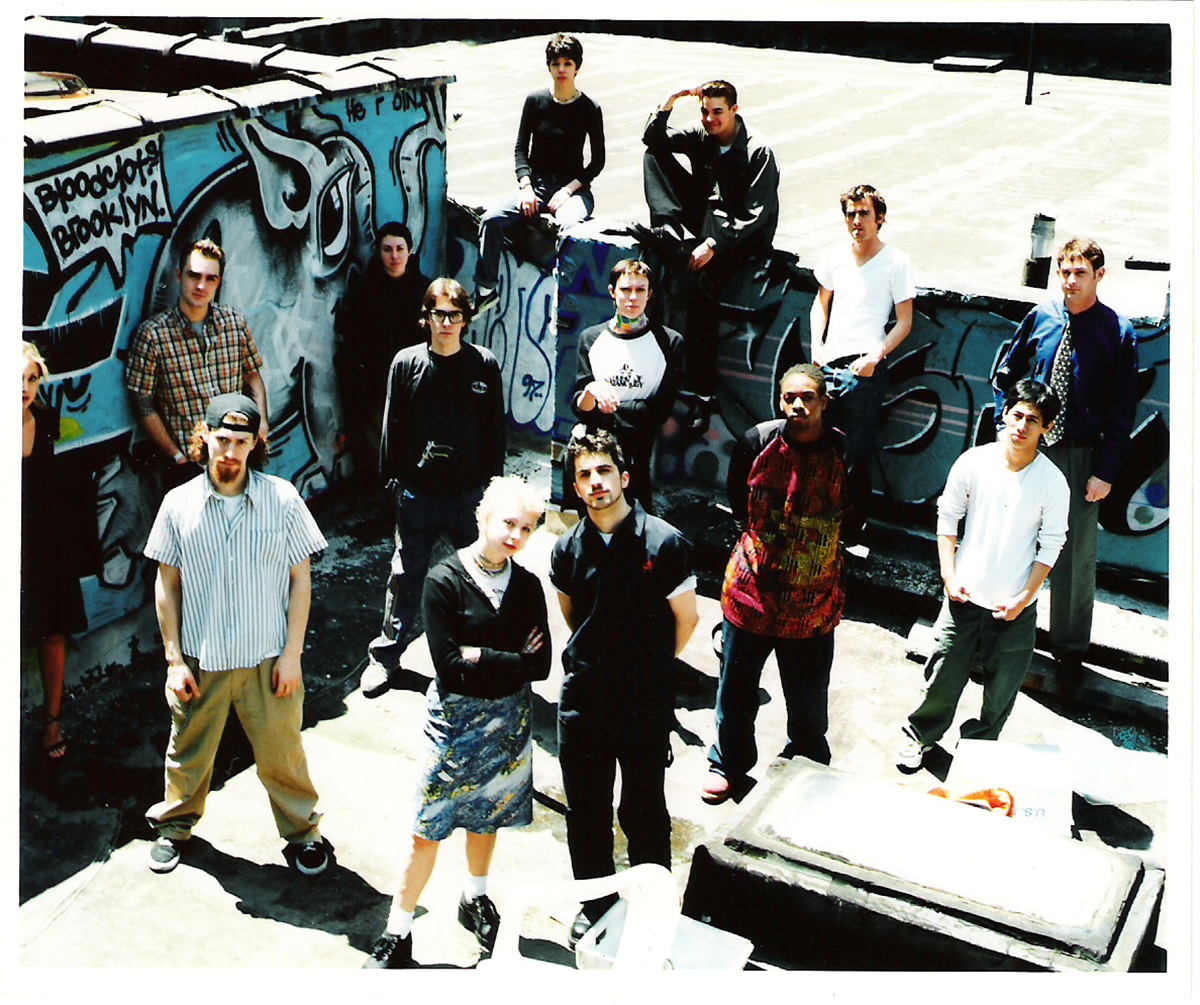
The Kings Mob on set of Threat with director Matt Pizzolo and producer Katie Nisa

Pizzolo interned at NYC film co-op Film/Video Arts, where he cleaned up after film classes in exchange for free access to cameras and lights while not in use. Nisa waitressed at East Village diner 7A to pay for production supplies that "couldn't be borrowed or stolen." Initially, sound recording was to be handled by one of Nisa's film student friends. When he could not make it to the first day of production, he instead gave Nisa a 15-minute lesson on how to run the Nagra. She went on to be the film's sole sound recordist for the first months of production.

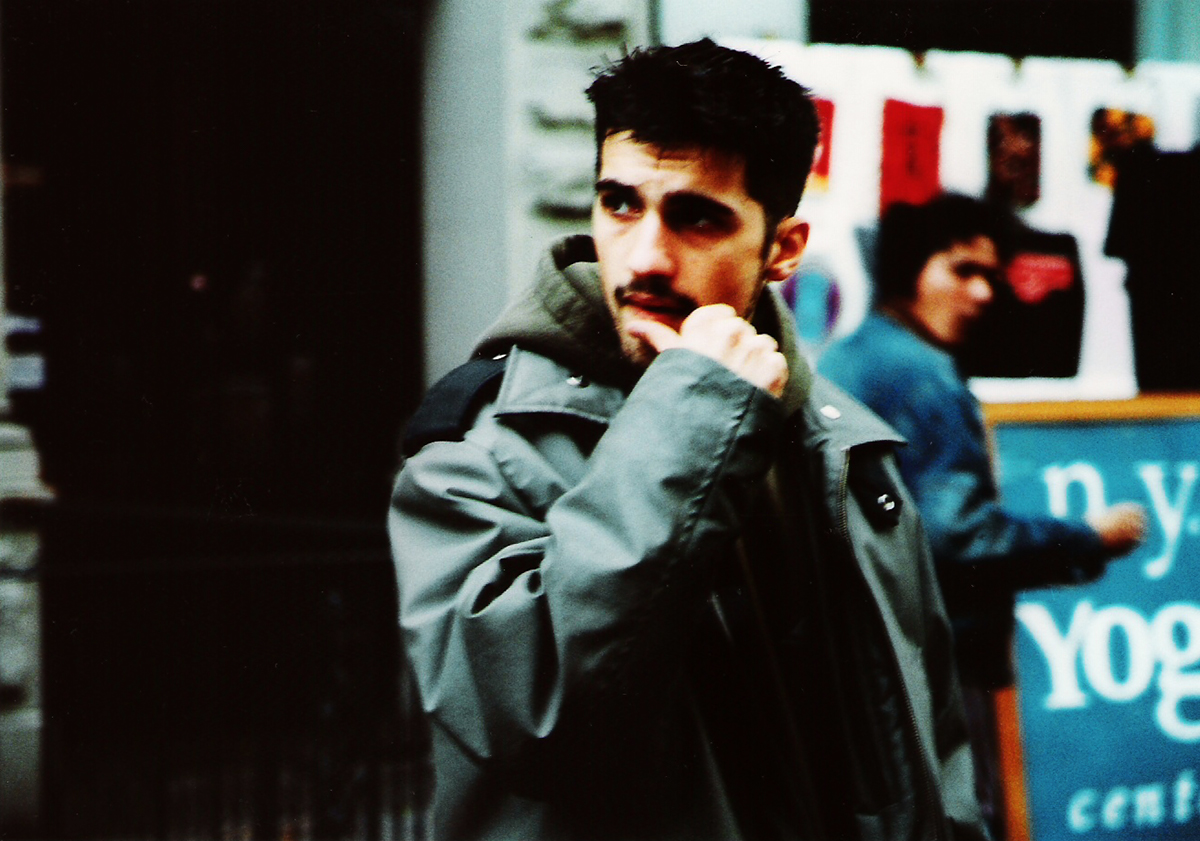
Director Matt Pizzolo on location at St. Mark's Place NYC shooting Threat

At the start of production, the crew consisted solely of Pizzolo, Nisa, Brancato, and Knight but over the course of production it grew to include over 200 young people from 5 different countries.

Animation was created by visual artist Killili and original score was composed by jungle music artist Queque, including the in-character original hip hop song "Am I A Threat?" performed by actor/rapper Kamouflage from the point of view of his character Desmond. A response song, the hardcore punk "I Am The Threat" produced by Sal Villanueva, was performed by actor/singer David R. Fisher from the point of view of his character Marco. Both songs were included on the Threat soundtrack.

Although shot without permits on a shoestring budget by a team of non-professional first-time filmmakers, some critics have compared Threat to such iconic films as The Warriors, Do the Right Thing, American History X, Slacker, Clerks, Romper Stomper, Kids, Doom Generation, Suburbia, and Fight Club.

Produced largely in the New York metalcore and hardcore punk scene, Threat features guest appearances by members of Most Precious Blood from the Trustkill Records label. Trustkill also contributed music to the film's score from Most Precious Blood, Bleeding Through, Eighteen Visions, and Terror. Most of the film's score, however, was composed by Alec Empire and his band Atari Teenage Riot. The score was constructed by Queque.

== Release ==
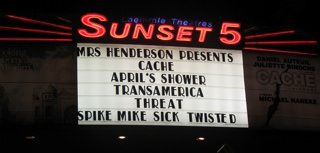
After years of underground screenings, Threat was released theatrically in January 2006, premiering at the Laemmle Sunset 5 in Hollywood and the Pioneer Theater in NYC.

In keeping with the punk and DiY ideologies of the movie and their production company, Pizzolo and Nisa eschewed distribution offers from Hollywood studios.

Initially, the film was released as an underground VHS tape and toured across the US and Europe, playing at non-traditional venues such as record stores, hip hop clubs, skateparks, and music festivals.

One of the more notable non-traditional screenings took place during the Sundance Film Festival at a Doc Martens shoe store across the street from Sundance's flagship Egyptian Theater. It was here that The Daily Telegraph documented the sold-out screenings during Sundance as a cover story in its Saturday Magazine, leading the filmmakers to be invited on a European tour with the film. When they returned home, Threat screenings were added as an attraction on the Van's Warped Tour.

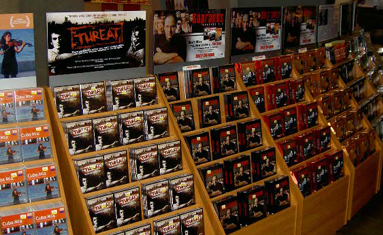
Threat at Tower Records, Lincoln Center in NYC

Critical response ranged from "easily one of the most important films of the decade" to "there is no explanation, no logic, and no reckoning... yet, despite its shortcomings and limitations on equipment, cast and crew, and finances, Threat manages to entertain with reckless abandon."

Years of touring culminated with an appearance at the Coachella Valley Music and Arts Festival, where music-video distributor HIQI Media signed on to distribute the film to theaters.

Soon after, Pizzolo formed the punk cinema label Halo 8 and released Threat on DVD through a distribution deal with Sony Pictures and RED Music, who distributed the film's soundtracks.

== Reception ==
Writing in Film Threat, T.W. Anderson rated Threat 4.5 out 5, saying "This film works on every conceivable level; it holds court not only as a historical document of time and place, but also as a window into the soul of American adolescence... The film is a revelation partly because of the subject matter, partly because of the DiY ethic but most importantly because the performances ring so true. The cast of mostly non-professional actors extract remarkable performances that frighten and stir the audience throughout this epic battle of cinematic creativity... Great art should assail the status quo, and that is what Pizzolo and Nisa’s film has skillfully accomplished."

Threat attracted controversy for allegedly glorifying violence and class conflict. When Threat premiered in US theaters, SuicideGirls commented, "Matt Pizzolo shook up Hollywood with his indie movie Threat and the guerrilla tactics he used to produce and distribute it. A defiant and confrontational movie about class war and unbridled youth violence, Threat is not exactly the type of film you might expect to earn its writer-director a multi-picture deal with Sony, but that's exactly what Pizzolo managed to accomplish along with his filmmaking partner Katie Nisa and their Kings Mob multimedia militia."

Writing in DVD Talk, Preston Jones said "A raw blast of visceral anger, Threat explodes off the screen eliciting comparisons to early Martin Scorsese, Abel Ferrara and Larry Clark's nihilistic masterpiece Kids. Pretty heady company and it's to director Matt Pizzolo's credit that when Threat works, it's more than worthy of being mentioned in the same breath as those films... Undeniably compelling, Threat grabs you by the throat and holds tight for 90 minutes."

In his 9 out of 10 review for Terrorizer Magazine, Neil Kulkarni called Threat "Genuinely unsettling, thrillingly chaotic, a tale of a cross-cultural riot that takes in philosophy, polemic and politics without taking a breath… it’s a morally complex, beautifully acted, occasionally sickeningly violent portrayal of the underground."

Ray Gun called Threat "important... special and different from everything else out there," The Village Voice's Long Island Voice called it a "triumph," Earcandy said "Threat is simply the voice of this generation's youth... it is easily one of the most important films of the decade," Entertainment Today called it "brutal yet fascinating," the McGill Daily said "Visionary director Matt Pizzolo takes a harsh look at what it means to be a disaffected youth, showing that the promised land of opportunity and the American dream are relics of the past," and Urb Magazine said Threat "makes Kids look like an after-school special."

== Awards ==
In October 2006, Threat won the Grand Prize for Best Feature at the Lausanne Underground Film and Music Festival in Lausanne, Switzerland. The award was presented to the filmmakers on stage by Crispin Glover.

In April 2007, Threat won the "First Feature Film - Special Mention" prize at the Rome Independent Film Festival in Rome, Italy.

== Soundtracks ==
=== Threat: Original Motion Picture Soundtrack ===
Threat's soundtrack consists mainly of digital hardcore courtesy of Alec Empire's DHR label and metalcore courtesy of Trustkill Records, as well as original score composed by Queque. The soundtrack was released by HALO 8 Entertainment in January 2006.

==== Track listing ====
1. "Night of Violence" – Alec Empire
2. "Start the Riot" – Atari Teenage Riot
3. "Into the Death" – Atari Teenage Riot
4. "Rage" – Atari Teenage Riot feat. Tom Morello & D-Stroy
5. "Sick to Death" – Atari Teenage Riot
6. "Get Up While You Can" – Atari Teenage Riot
7. "Gotta Get Out" – Alec Empire
8. "Common Enemy" – Panic DHH
9. "Wanna Peel" – EC8OR
10. "Number Seven with a Bullet" – Bleeding Through
11. "The Great Red Shift" – Most Precious Blood
12. "One Hell of a Prize Fighter" – Eighteen Visions
13. "Overcome" – Terror
14. "Drone" – Eyes Like Knives
15. "mPathik" – queque
16. "heVn" – queque
17. "Am I A Threat?" - Kamouflage and queque
18. "I Am The Threat" – King David and Sal Villanueva
19. "Kids Are United" – Atari Teenage Riot

=== Threat: Music That Inspired the Movie ===
In addition to the Threat soundtrack, Halo8 produced and released the compilation Threat: Music That Inspired the Movie. In the tradition of soundtracks featuring collaborations/remixes, from such films as Spawn and Judgment Night, the album consists of mashups of hardcore punk and metalcore with breakcore. The album was released by HALO 8 Entertainment in January 2006.

==== Track listing ====
1. "Pandemic" – Most Precious Blood vs. Alec Empire
2. "World at War" – Agnostic Front vs. Schizoid
3. "Ghost in the Machine" – Inside Out vs. Oktopus from Dälek
4. "World Ablaze" (Threat mix) – Killswitch Engage vs. Edgey
5. "Overkill" – Terror vs. Enduser
6. "Champagne Enemaz" – Eighteen Visions vs. Otto von Schirach
7. "Zolobovine" – Gorilla Biscuits vs. Defragmentation
8. "Cannibal Kitten" – The Icarus Line vs. The End
9. "Slapped with an X" – Vision of Disorder vs. The Tyrant
10. "Bring It" – Judge vs. Bill Youngman
11. "Stalwart Carapace" – Youth of Today vs. Edgey
12. "Deathbed" – Bleeding Through vs. Hecate
13. "I Know That You're Lying" – Today Is The Day vs. darph/nadeR
14. "Star Buried in My Yard" – Glassjaw vs. Enduser
15. "Don't Step" – Minor Threat vs. Holocaust
