= Esther Bell =

American film director

- Born: Boston, Massachusetts, U.S.
- Occupation: Filmmaker
- Years active: 1992 - present

Esther Bell is an American film producer, director, screenwriter, social activist, and community entrepreneur. Her two feature films, Godass and Exist, received critical acclaim in The New York Times and Variety for their tones of social and political relevance.

== Early life and influences ==
Esther Bell was born in Boston, Massachusetts to Teri Bell and father-at-birth Randall Bell, who died at age 49. Bell learned of her biological father, gay artist, at age 17. Esther Bell's mother is a technical artist who has worked in architectural interior design and urban planning in Columbia, Charleston, and Beaufort, South Carolina, and Savannah, Georgia. She was graphic designer for a recent book on the famous Oglethorpe Plan of Savannah.

While attending high schools in Charleston, Bell created a political, music periodical magazine. Originally a photocopied publication she started at the age of 14, later the newspaper reached a regional distribution of around 7,000 in southern towns with colleges and alternative art scenes. Her friends in Lay Quiet Awhile (Danielle Howle), Glam Dogs (Ray Jicha), and Hootie and the Blowfish helped raise funds to print the magazine. While she was putting out the zine, Bell shot a documentary with equipment from The South Carolina Arts Commission about living in small southern town, with raunchy details describing the thriving music scene. The piece was called Mark of An Amateur. and later received an award on the TV channel, TLC.

Esther interviewed famous bands like The Replacements, They Might Be Giants, Minor Threat, Social Distortion, Sham 69, Laurie Anderson, and Das Damen. Bell has joked, "As a girl, the conventional gig was to be a groupie, but I avoided all that crap by interviewing the bands and putting them in my magazine."

Beyond documenting the southern music scene, Bell was politically active. In Charleston, Esther and her punk, gay, and multi-race friends were the target of police brutality and social injustice, awaking her to the abuse of power and strength of hatred and bigotry. The experience drove her to move to New York in search of greater creative and intellectual freedom.

In New York, Bell worked a wide range of jobs to pay her college and living expenses. She was an assistant to the artist Bryan Hunt where she encountered a range of influences including Bernadette Peters, Tama Janowitz, John McEnroe, and Tatum O’Neal. For a short time she chauffeured for Man Ray’s agent. Bell also worked at the notorious Limelight, did catering for commercials and later worked in production in almost every position. Eventually, she graduated magna cum laude from the City College of New York, with a degree in Ancient History and a minor in Film.

== Film and television career ==
Bell's first documentary, Mark of an Amateur, won an award from TLC (The Learning Channel). Before embarking upon her feature film career after college, Bell shot several successful short films, including PURPLE JESUS, which screened as part of the Nuyorican's Fifth Night Series and the Women in the Director's Chair International Festival.

Bell's first feature film, Godass (2000), starred artist-actor Nika Feldman, Julianne Nicholson, with George Tynan Crowley as the punk protagonist's gay father, Fred Schneider of the B-52's as his lover, and Tina Holmes. The film was sold and screened on Showtime and Sundance Channel. The film received favorable reviews and won numerous festival awards and tells the story of a young punk girl with a gay father.

Exist (2004) was written and performed by Ben Bartlett and Nick Mevoli, with a notable appearance by TV on the Radio lead singer Tunde Adebimpe, and with George Tynan Crowley appearing as the protagonist's father. It received critical acclaim, as cited earlier, in the New York Times and Variety due to its incisive look into young activists' lives. Particularly relevant to a post-9/11 generation of activists, the film has been screened in festivals around the world, including the International Rotterdam Film Festival. Nick Mevoli's life was cut short when he was attempting to set an American record at the Vertical Blue freediving competition in the Bahamas after receiving world recognition in earlier competitions. Writer Adam Skolnick is writing a book about Mevoli's life which will include the multiple scripts, movies, and details of Nick and Esther's friendship.

Bell's picture is featured on the cover of Andrea Richard's book Girl Director: A How-To Guide for the First-Time, Flat-Broke Film Maker and she is the subject of the first chapter of Robert Anasi's book The Last Bohemia: Scenes from the Life of Williamsburg, Brooklyn.

In addition to her feature films, Bell has directed for IFC, ABC, Much Music, Court TV, Current TV, Sundance Channel and MTV. Some of the Biography pieces she is most proud of directing were with Tunde Adebimpe, Kyp Malone, and all the members of "TV on the RADIO"

Bell has done video interviews with Michael Moore, Lisa Cholodenko; Damon Dash; and shot interviews with Gary Oldman, Joseph Gordon-Levitt, Guy Pearce, and Gus van Sant.

== Filmography ==
Feature Films

- 2001, Godass, director, writer, producer
- 2004, Exist, director, writer, producer

Short Films

- 1992, Mark of an Amateur, director, writer, producer
- 1994, Purple Jesus, director, writer, producer
- Dora the Explorer (TV, 2 episodes), editor
- One Ring Zero: Addendum
- 2008 (release), Cornered: A Life Caught in the Ring, producer

== Activism and entrepreneurship ==
While attending college in New York, Esther lost close friends to both heroin and AIDS. Her experiences led her behind the lens where she would create two public service announcements: Ashley, about heroin addiction, and Sexually Explicit Material, addressing HIV prevention. Ashley received an honorary award from President Bill Clinton for its subsequent initiation of a national campaign against heroin addiction during the mid-nineties. Presently, she is working with the Andi Foundation (http://www.theandifoundation.org/) and Rachel Maddow on a portrait of the women who were successfully mentored by the not-for-profit created to develop female leaders to work around the world for peace.

In 2010, Bell opened The West, a coffeehouse and bar, in the Brooklyn neighborhood of Williamsburg, where she has resided for twenty years. The West is named in honor of Brooklyn born Mae West. Opened in Sept, 2010, The West soon became a gathering spot for the neighborhood's locals, including a vibrant and diverse creative community.

Rising disposable income in Williamsburg's large hipster community has recently attracted corporate attention. As Starbucks and other chains announced plans to open shops in Williamsburg, a debate over gentrification arose, attracting the interest of national media. Articles in local and national media have portrayed Bell and her café, The West, as representative of Williamsburg's unique and edgy character, in sharp contrast to the standardized business models now appearing in the community.

== Bibliography ==
- Booth, Tod; (2005-03-02). "Exist," San Francisco Indie Fest. (Indie Fest '05). Retrieved on (2007-06-18).
- Dean, Michael W. (2003). $30 Film School. Premier Press, pp. 463–465. ISBN 1-59200-067-3.
- Harvey, Dennis; (2005-02-23). "Exist," Variety. (Variety review). Retrieved on (2007-06-18).
- Harvey, Dennis; (2000-07-17). "Godass", Variety. (Variety review). Retrieved on (2007-06-18).
- Lee, Nathan; (2005-12-1). "Two Young Radicals and Their Dovetailing Destinies," The New York Times. ("NY Times movies) Retrieved on (2007-06-18).
- Richards, Andrea. (2001). Girl Director: A How-To Guide for the First-Time, Flat-Broke Film and Video Maker. Ten Speed Press, pp. 114. ISBN 1-58008-675-6.
- Summer 2002
