= Xombie (comics) =

Series of cartoons and comics

Xombie is a series of Flash cartoons and comics produced by James Farr. Farr, who initially conceived Xombie in 1994 as an idea for a feature film, began releasing self-created animations in chapters for online audiences in 2003. In 2005, Wetsand Animation was reportedly creating an animated film based on Farr's flash cartoons. Instead, in 2009, a DVD was released under the title Xombie: Dead on Arrival, weaving the series' episodes together into a feature-length movie, while also compiling the episodes separately.

In 2007, Devil's Due Publishing released a six issue comic book sequel to Dead on Arrival titled Xombie: Reanimated.

A third part of the Xombie trilogy, titled Death Warmed Over, was planned, but cancelled.

In 2009, DreamWorks Studios planned to produce a film with Alex Kurtzman and Roberto Orci as producers.

In March 2017, Farr began a new series on YouTube titled Xombie: Dead Ahead, which is meant to be a continuation of the series, proclaimed as "the next chapter".

== Characters ==
Xombie features Dirge (voiced by Canadian Actor Voice Actor Geoff Edwards), a variant zombie whose mission is to help the mysterious human Zoe Olesia Elgin and other humans survive the zombie apocalypse. Zoe is voiced by Michelle Fairney in Xombie: Dead on Arrival, but she is voiced by Sarah Beth Pfeifer in Dead Ahead. Dirge is accompanied by a loyal variant dog named Cerberus, and the group is allied with a mummy-like variant named Nephtys (voiced by Allison Rupert) and a raptor named Chimera.

Various humans include Governor Marrow (voiced by Robin Siegerman), Lt. Barrack (voiced by Sean Christopher Shaw), and Zoe's mother, whose fate is unknown.

The main antagonist of the series is Gallows, a bounty hunter variant.

== See also ==
- List of Devil's Due Publishing publications
- List of zombie short films and undead-related projects
