= Melissa Bacelar =

American actress

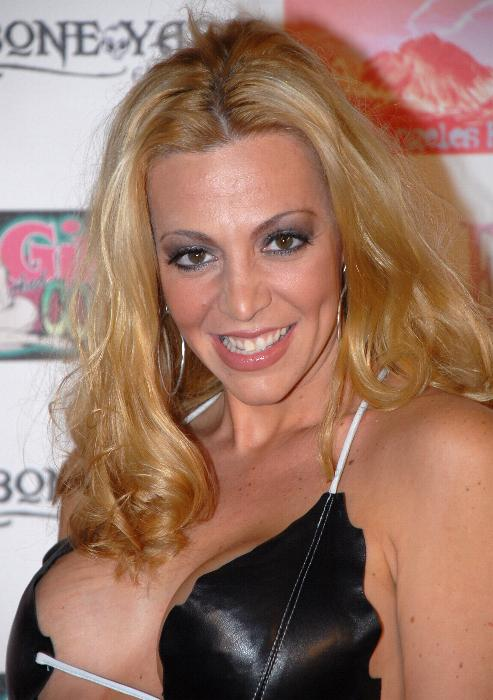
- Bacelar at Pink Eye premiere, January 2008
- Born: Melissa Racquel Bacelar; Piscataway, New Jersey, U.S.
- Occupation: Actress
- Years active: 2000–present

Melissa Racquel Bacelar is an American actress. She is best known as a scream queen and is most associated with the horror film genre. She is also known for her role as a waitress in 10 episodes of the ABC series One Life to Live between 2000 and 2002.

Bacelar had a strong Roman Catholic upbringing, attending a Catholic school in Edison, New Jersey. She then studied at the Mason Gross School of the Arts for theatre for a year before completing a two-year Meisner program at the School for Film and Television in New York City.

She made her screen debut in Citizen Toxie: The Toxic Avenger IV in 2000. In 2003 she appeared in the film This Thing of Ours as a secretary. In 2008 she starred as the lead character of Delilah in film Pink Eye, and appeared on an episode of Hollywood Residential. In 2009 she played the lead role in the sex horror comedy, The Scream.
