= Your Mommy Kills Animals =

2007 documentary film by Curt Johnson

- Film poster
- Directed by: Curt Johnson
- Written by: Curt Johnson
- Produced by: Maura Flynn; Curt Johnson
- Cinematography: Anthony Rodriguez
- Edited by: Greg Browning
- Music by: Gregory Scarnici
- Production company: Indie Genius Productions
- Distributed by: HALO 8 Entertainment
- Release date: July 20, 2007
- Running time: 105 minutes
- Country: United States
- Language: English
- Budget: $750,000
- Box office: $34,000

Your Mommy Kills Animals is a 2007 American documentary film written and directed by Curt Johnson. Filmed in several locations across the United States, the film is about the animal liberation movement and takes its name from a 2003 PETA comic book of the same name. The film was picked up for distribution by HALO 8 Entertainment after successful festival response.

Among those interviewed for the documentary were Jessica Biel, James Cromwell, Kaley Cuoco, Bo Derek, Gloria Estefan, Jorja Fox, Leo Grillo, Tippi Hedren, Katherine Heigl, Christopher Hitchens, Margot Kidder, Jennifer Lee, Joe Mantegna, Mark McGrath, Esai Morales, Shelley Morrison, Alexandra Paul, Ben Stein, and Betty White, as well as many individuals involved with animal rights movements.

Filming began in January 2006, covering 17 states in 90 days, and was in editing by April of that year.

The film is inspired by a political comic book Your Mommy Kills Animals published by PETA starting in 2003.

== Lawsuits ==
Maura Flynn and Curt Johnson agreed to make a documentary film which would focus on PETA, taking a critical view of the group's actions. In 2005, in return for a $60,000 return on his investment and exclusive right to promote it, corporate lobbyist Richard Berman invested $300,000 toward production of the film. However, in 2006, disagreements arose regarding the film's treatment, with Johnson disregarding creative input from Berman. As director, Johnson chose to focus on the trials and convictions of members of Stop Huntingdon Animal Cruelty (SHAC), rather than focus on a critique of PETA. As this was contrary to the 2005 agreement, Flynn, Berman, and their associates filed a suit claiming that Flynn was a joint author of the film as originally, and requesting also that damages be awarded to Berman for Johnson's alleged breach of their contract. A jury trial granted both requests, and awarded Berman $360,000 in damages. However, as the court's decision did not include a declaration affirming Berman exclusive promotion and distribution rights to the film, and as Johnson had begun promoting the film through interviews and press releases in contradiction to the 2005 agreement, Berman appealed that part of the decision. The appeals court affirmed that earlier decision, in that granting Berman exclusive distribution after he had been made whole would constitute a double recovery, wherein Berman lost his appeal.

== Synopsis ==
The film reports on controversies concerning and within the animal rights movement. These include external conflicts between animal rights advocates and medical researchers and restaurant operators, and internal disagreements within the animal rights movement between the animal shelter operators and the confrontationalists who demonstrate outside homes of corporate opponents.

== Recognition ==
On Rotten Tomatoes, the film has a 91% score based on 35 reviews with an average rating of 7.60/10. The site's critical consensus states "[Your Mommy Kills Animals is a] thoroughly fascinating, well-presented examination of the animal rights debate that is both provocative and thought-provoking".

Variety reviewer John Anderson called the documentary "A miraculously evenhanded treatment of a snarlingly divisive debate," adding "There are no good guys or bad guys in this propulsive film, but there's enough in the way of odd characters and bad behavior to amuse and inform auds who only marginally care about the content."

Pittsburgh Post-Gazette film critic Barry Paris reported that the film focused on the legal case of Josh Harper and Kevin Kjonaas after their having been arrested for eco-terrorism in the federal government's enforcing of the 2006 Animal Enterprise Terrorism Act. He made note of the numerous celebrities interviewed, offering "There's not an objective one in the lot. I love 'em all."

Eye Weekly reviewer Jason Anderson wrote of the title, "It’s just one example of the extreme rhetoric and inflammatory tactics (sometimes literally so) that exist within the animal-rights movement, a broad category that actually includes an array of groups with differing philosophies and strategies when it comes to defending critters." He made note that the film dealt with subjects ranging from "the practices of the Animal Liberation Front to PETA’s courting of celebrities to the rescue of animals after Hurricane Katrina," but stressed that the director focused on the 2006 trial of six Americans arrested for their involvement in the "Stop Huntingdon Animal Cruelty" campaign which had targeted a British corporation that does animal testing. He called the documentary smart and comprehensive in its dealing with the federal government's declaration that "animal rights extremists comprised America’s primary domestic threat."

Slant Magazine reviewer Sara Schieron wrote that although the film presented a portrait of the Animal Liberation Front, the organization does not include organizations such as PETA or The Humane Society of the United States. She noted that both these organizations declined to be interviewed by the filmmakers, and that the film concentrated on the grass-roots level as a "documentary for thinkers that offers dense and comprehensive representation of animal rights as movement, ethic, culture, and law."

Peter Martin of Cinematical wrote that the director explored the animal rights movement as inspired by "a post-9/11 FBI alert identifying animal rights activists as the number one domestic terror threat," and that he interviewed both activists and detractors alike in order to gain "as many points of view as possible."

Brian Dorf of eFilm Critic observed that Curt Johnson showed "a stance of directorial bravery that is seldom showcased," and appeared to not be "taking a side towards either extreme." He offered that the film "holds its ground impressively trying to tenderly extract points from both sides of the argument." In his review summary, he wrote that the film "is a difficult movie to watch, but an important one to consider."

== Screenings ==
Your Mommy Kills Animals has played at multiple film festivals, including Hot Docs Canadian International Documentary Festival, Toronto, Ontario, Canada; Fantasia Festival, Montreal, Quebec, Canada; Melbourne International Film Festival, Melbourne, Australia; San Francisco International Film Festival, San Francisco, California; Boise Film Festival, Boise, Idaho; Argus Fest, Denver, Colorado; Burning Man, Nevada; Sweden Vegan Film Festival, Sweden; and Dok Leipzig, Leipzig, Germany.
