= Pink Eye (film) =

- Directed by: James Adam Tucker
- Written by: Joshua Nelson
- Produced by: Melissa Bacelar; Matt Pizzolo
- Cinematography: Brian Fass
- Music by: Frank Barfi
- Production company: Lost Angeles Films
- Release date: 2008
- Country: United States
- Language: English

Pink Eye is a 2008 American horror film directed by James Adam Tucker. The film is set in a run-down asylum where drugs are tested in a small town in upstate New York.

== Cast ==
- Melissa Bacelar ... Delilah
- Joshua Nelson ... Brandon
- Joshua James ... Edgar
- Ed Avila ... Dr. Galen
- Emma Hinz ... Daisy
- James E. Smith ... Dr. Grahm
- J. Scott Green ... Technician #2
- Bridget Megan Clark ... Holly
- Frank Franconeri ... Martino
- Alan Rowe Kelly ... Schlitze
- Raine Brown ... Nikki
- Jeff Spinner ... Rabbit
- Jocelyn Barker ... Tessa
- Ken Smoleki ... Pink Eye
- JessAnn Smith ... Heather
- Nathan Faudree ... Matt
