= Crash Romeo =

American pop punk band

- Origin: Bernardsville, New Jersey, United States
- Genre: Pop-punk
- Years active: 2004–present
- Labels: Trustkill, Broken Graves
- Members: Travis Weber; Ryan Weber; Steve Anderson; Steve Mathews

Crash Romeo is an American pop-punk band from Bernardsville, New Jersey.

== History ==
Crash Romeo was formed by members who had previously played together in the band Centsless. Members of the band Bedlight for Blue Eyes suggested the band to their label Trustkill Records, who signed the group late in 2005. Their debut, Minutes to Miles appeared on the label the following year, produced by Chris Badami. A follow-up full-length, Gave Me the Clap, was released in 2008. In 2021, Crash Romeo recorded their third album Ashtrays and Apathy which was released in March 2023.

== Band members ==
- Travis Weber - vocals, guitar
- Ryan Weber - drums
- Steve Anderson - guitar
- Steve Mathews - bass, vocals

== Discography ==
Studio albums

- Minutes to Miles (Trustkill, 2006)
- Gave Me the Clap (Trustkill, 2008)
- Ashtrays and Apathy (Broken Graves Records, 2023)
