= Sequart Organization =

Online magazine about comics

- Abbreviation: Sequart
- Founded: 1996
- Founded at: United States
- Purpose: Comics studies
- Headquarters: Edwardsville, Illinois
- President & CEO: Julian Darius
- Website: sequart.org

Sequart Organization (/ˈsɛk.wɑːrt/; also known as Sequart Research & Literacy Organization) is an online magazine that focuses on the study of popular culture and the promotion of comic books as an art form. Sequart also publishes books and produces documentary films. It was founded in 1996 by Julian Darius. Sequart's editor-in-chief is Mike Phillips.

Through their publications, Sequart Organization bridges the gap between academia and fandom and makes scholarship on the medium accessible to the general public.

== Name ==
The name Sequart is a portmanteau of "sequential art," itself a term which was coined by Will Eisner in his book Comics and Sequential Art. Unlike terms such as comic books or graphic novels, which refer to a specific format, the term "sequart" refers to the medium itself, therefore including the aforementioned formats, but also comic strips, manga, illustrated fiction, picture books, and even sculpture, for example in form of Stations of the Cross.

== Accolades ==
The Village Voice named Tom Shapira's Curing the Postmodern Blues as one of 2013's Best Graphic Novels saying, "a PhD-level explication... Shapira's treatise gathers up plot threads and illuminates character motivations to reveal the tale as an attempt, in Morrison's own words, 'to turn the very basic horrors of existence into comedy and poetry.'"

In 2013, Latino Review named The Image Revolution "one of the best documentaries of the year."

In 2015, She Makes Comics won the award for best documentary at the Comic-Con International Independent Film Festival.

== Books ==
Sequart has published several scholarly non-fiction books on subjects related to the medium. Sequart's first book, about Batman Begins, was the first scholarly book ever published on Christopher Nolan's Batman movies. Published in 2005, it appeared prior to the film's release on home video, the first time an analytic book had ever been published so quickly following a movie's release. Sequart's second book was the first scholarly book about comics writer Grant Morrison.

- Beard, Jim (Ed.). Gotham City 14 Miles: 14 Essays on Why the 1960s Batman TV Series Matters. (2010)
- Bensam, Richard (Ed.). Minutes to Midnight: Twelve Essays on Watchmen. (2010)
- Berenato, Joseph F. (Ed.). New Life and New Civilizations: Exploring Star Trek Comics. (2014)
- Boucher, Ian (Ed.). Humans and Paragons: Essays on Super-Hero Justice. (2017)
- Callahan, Timothy. Grant Morrison: The Early Years. (2007)
- Callahan, Timothy (Ed.). Teenagers from the Future: Essays on the Legion of Super-Heroes. (2008)
  - Darius, Julian. Revisionism, Radical Experimentation, and Dystopia in Keith Giffen’s Legion of Super-Heroes. (2012)
- Collins, Loren (Ed.). Knight's Past: A Starman Companion. (forthcoming)
- Carpenter, Greg. The British Invasion: Alan Moore, Neil Gaiman, Grant Morrison, and the Invention of the Modern Comic Book Writer. (2016)
- Darius, Julian. Improving the Foundations: Batman Begins from Comics to Screen. (2005)
- Darius, Julian. And the Universe so Big: Understanding Batman: The Killing Joke. (2012)
- Darius, Julian. Classics on Infinite Earths: The Justice League and DC Crossover Canon. (2015)
  - Darius, Julian. Everything and a Mini-Series for the Kitchen Sink: Understanding Infinite Crisis. (2012)
- Darius, Julian. This Lightning, This Madness: Understanding Alan Moore’s Miracleman, Book One. (forthcoming)
- Darius, Julian. Inaudible Dreams: Essays on Sequential Art. (forthcoming)
  - Darius, Julian. The Weirdest Sci-Fi Comic Ever Made: Understanding Jack Kirby’s 2001: A Space Odyssey. (2013)
  - Darius, Julian. When Manga Came to America: Super-Hero Revisionism in Mai, the Psychic Girl. (2014)
  - Darius, Julian. Because We are Compelled: How Watchmen Interrogates the Comics Tradition. (2024)
  - Darius, Julian. The Citybot's Library: Essays on the Transformers. (2024)
- Gray, Richard. Moving Target: The History and Evolution of Green Arrow. (2017)
- Hammond, S.G. (Ed.). The Mignolaverse: Hellboy and the Comics Art of Mike Mignola. (2019)
- Handley, Rich & Joseph F. Berenato (Ed.). The Sacred Scrolls: Comics on the Planet of the Apes (2015)
- Handley, Rich & Joseph F. Berenato (Ed.). A Long Time Ago: Exploring the Star Wars Cinematic Universe (2015)
- Handley, Rich & Joseph F. Berenato (Ed.). A Galaxy Far, Far Away: Exploring Star Wars Comics (2016)
- Handley, Rich & Joseph F. Berenato (Ed.). Bright Eyes, Ape City: Examining the Planet of the Apes Mythos (2017)
- Handley, Rich & Joseph F. Berenato (Ed.). A More Civilized Age: Exploring the Star Wars Expanded Universe (2017)
- Handley, Rich & Lou Tambone (Ed.). Somewhere Beyond the Heavens: Exploring Battlestar Galactica. (2019)
- Handley, Rich & Lou Tambone (Ed.). From Bayou to Abyss: Examining John Constantine, Hellblazer. (2020)
- Handley, Rich & Lou Tambone (Ed.). Musings on Monsters: Observations on the World of Classic Horror. (2021)
- Handley, Rich & Joseph Dilworth Jr. (Ed.). Unauthorized Offworld Activation: Exploring the Stargate Franchise. (2022)
- Helvie, Forrest (Ed.). How to Analyze & Review Comics: A Handbook on Comics Criticism (2021)
- Hernando, David. Why Do We Fall?: Examining Christopher Nolan’s The Dark Knight Trilogy. (2022)
- Klock, Geoff. The Future of Comics, the Future of Men: Matt Fraction’s Casanova. (2015)
- Lindsay, Ryan K. (Ed.). The Devil is in the Details: Examining Matt Murdock and Daredevil. (2013)
  - Lindsay, Ryan K. Blind Dates and Broken Hearts: The Tragic Loves of Matthew Murdock. (2013)
- Ludwig, Logan. Moving Panels: Translating Comics to Film. (2015)
- McLean, Thomas J. Mutant Cinema: The X-Men Trilogy from Comics to Screen. (2008)
- Meaney, Patrick. Our Sentence is Up: Seeing Grant Morrison’s The Invisibles. (2010)
- Meaney, Patrick & Kevin Thurman. Warren Ellis: The Captured Ghosts Interviews. (2013)
- Milazzo, Melissa. Time is a Flat Circle: Examining True Detective, Season One (2019)
- Nevett, Chad (Ed.). Shot in the Face: A Savage Journey to the Heart of Transmetropolitan. (2013)
- Powell, Jason. The Best There is at What He Does: Examining Chris Claremont’s X-Men. (2016)
- Shapira, Tom. Curing the Postmodern Blues: Reading Grant Morrison and Chris Weston’s The Filth in the 21st Century. (2013)
- Tambone, Lou & Joe Bongiorno (Ed.). The Cyberpunk Nexus: Exploring the Blade Runner Universe. (2017)
- Thurman, Kevin & Julian Darius. Voyage in Noise: Warren Ellis and the Demise of Western Civilization. (2013)
- Walker, Cody (Ed.). Keeping the World Strange: A Planetary Guide. (2011)
- Walker, Cody. The Anatomy of Zur-en-Arrh: Understanding Grant Morrison’s Batman. (2014)
- Weatherly, Scott (Ed.). Judging Dredd: Examining the World of Judge Dredd. (2021)
- Weatherly, Scott (Ed.). Gods and Marvels: Essays on Moon Knight. (2023)
- Weatherly, Scott & Julian Darius. Stories out of Time and Space, Vol. 1. (forthcoming)

== Films ==
Sequart Organization has also produced documentary films on subjects related to comic books and graphic novels.

- Grant Morrison: Talking with Gods (2010)
- Warren Ellis: Captured Ghosts (2012)
- Comics in Focus: Chris Claremont's X-Men (2013)
- The Image Revolution (2014)
- Diagram for Delinquents (2014)
- She Makes Comics (2014)
- Neil Gaiman: Dream Dangerously (2016)
