= She Makes Comics =

- Directed by: Marisa Stotter
- Produced by: Patrick Meaney; Jordan Rennert; Marisa Stotter; Karen Green; Mike Phillips; Julian Darius
- Starring: Clare Grant; Rileah Vanderbilt; Milynn Sarley; Chris Claremont; Felicia D. Henderson; Amy Dallen
- Cinematography: Jordan Rennert
- Edited by: Marisa Stotter; Patrick Meaney
- Production companies: Respect Films; Sequart Organization
- Distributed by: XLrator Media
- Release date: December 9, 2014
- Running time: 73 Minutes
- Country: United States
- Language: English
- Budget: $60,000

She Makes Comics is a 2014 documentary film about the history of women in the comic book industry since the medium's beginnings in the early 1900s. It features interviews with key industry professionals, including artists, writers, editors, and retailers, as well as with prominent members of the surrounding fan culture.

== Background ==
She Makes Comics is the fifth co-production between Respect Films and Sequart Organization. The film was directed by Marisa Stotter, who began working with Respect Films during the summer of 2013. Production began in October 2013, with several interviews conducted in the Southern California region.

=== Kickstarter campaign ===
On February 3, 2014, Sequart Organization launched a Kickstarter campaign to fund the film. Over the 31-day funding period, the campaign raised $54,001, nearly $15,000 more than the initial goal. This surplus allowed the project to announce several stretch goals, including a mini-documentary about the first female African-American cartoonist, Jackie Ormes, that would be a companion to She Makes Comics.

== Production ==
The filmmakers traveled to several cities, including New York and San Diego, to conduct interviews with notable figures in comics. Among the creatives interviewed are writer Kelly Sue DeConnick, X-Men writer Chris Claremont, Elfquest creators Wendy and Richard Pini, artist Becky Cloonan, and Tits & Clits Comix co-founder Joyce Farmer. The industry professionals interviewed include former executive editor of DC Comics' Vertigo imprint Karen Berger, former president of DC Comics Paul Levitz, former DC publisher Jenette Kahn, Comic-Con International organizer Jackie Estrada, and Comics Beat's Heidi MacDonald. Additional interviews were filmed with various scholars, journalists, entertainers, and prominent members of the fan community.

== Release ==
The film premiered at the Comic-Con International Film Festival in 2015, where it won the best documentary award. The film was subsequently acquired for distribution by XLRator Media.

== Plot ==
The film traces the history of women in comic books as industry professionals and as fans. It begins with the early days of comics and follows the rise of women in the emerging comic book industry of the 30s and 40s. It tells the story of women's contributions to mainstream comics, featuring such figures as artists Ramona Fradon (who drew for DC Comics) and Marie Severin (who worked at Marvel Comics). The film also focuses on the underground comics movement of the 70s, the rise of women into prominent positions at mainstream publishers in the 80s, and the flourishing of female creators in independent comics and webcomics.
