= Rat Queens =

American fantasy comics series, 2013-19

- Cover of Rat Queens #1, featuring, clockwise from the top: Dee, Betty, Hannah, and Violet.

Publication information
- Publisher: Image Comics
- Schedule: Monthly, with breaks
- Genre: Comic fantasy
- Publication date: September 2013

Creative team
- Created by: Kurtis J. Wiebe; Roc Upchurch
- Written by: Kurtis J. Wiebe (#1–16, Vol. 2 #1–15); Ryan Ferrier (Vol. 2 #16–present)
- Artist(s): Roc Upchurch (#1–8); Stjepan Šejić (#9–10); Tess Fowler (#11–16); Owen Gieni (Vol. 2 #1–15); Priscilla Petraites (Vol. 2 #16–present)
- Letterer: Ryan Ferrier
- Colorist(s): Tamra Bonvillain (#11–16); Marco Lesko (Vol. 2 #16–present)

Collected editions
- 1. Sass and Sorcery: ISBN 9781607069454
- 2. The Far Reaching Tentacles of N’Rygoth: ISBN 9781632150400
- 3. Demons: ISBN 9781632157355
- 4. High Fantasies: ISBN 9781632158994
- 5. The Colossal Magic Nothing: ISBN 9781534306776
- 6. The Infernal Path: ISBN 9781534310698
- 7. The Once and Future King: ISBN 9781534314665
- 8. The God Dilemma: ISBN 9781534316720

Rat Queens is an American fantasy comic book series created by Kurtis J. Wiebe and Roc Upchurch, published by Image Comics. The series was written by Wiebe until Ryan Ferrier took over in mid 2019. The original 2013–2016 run was drawn by Roc Upchurch, Stjepan Šejić, and Tess Fowler. The series was put on hiatus in April 2016 and returned in March 2017 with the new artist Owen Gieni. Currently, Moritat & Casey Silver are the ongoing artists.

Recounting the exploits of a party of four rowdy, foul-mouthed adventurers, the series has received critical praise, was nominated for the 2014 Eisner Award for Best New Series and won the 2015 GLAAD Media Award.

== Publication history ==
Writer Kurtis Wiebe described the series as a "love letter to my years of D&D (...) and fantasy" with a modern twist, and the concept as "Lord of the Rings meets Bridesmaids". Originally intended to be funded through Kickstarter, it was picked up by Jim Valentino at Image Comics a week before the funding campaign was to start. Rat Queens was intended to be published at a pace of ten issues per year, with two-month breaks between collections.

After artist Roc Upchurch was arrested on charges of domestic violence in November 2014, Wiebe announced that Upchurch would no longer be illustrating the series. Image Comics announced that Stjepan Šejić would continue the series as artist beginning with issue #9 in February 2015, preceded by a special issue about the orc warrior Braga by guest artist Tess Fowler in January 2015. After Šejić left the series in July 2015 for health reasons, Fowler continued the series as main artist, joined by colorist Tamra Bonvillain.

In April 2016, Fowler left the title, and Wiebe paused work on it. In May 2016, Fowler wrote that Wiebe pushed her out to make room for Upchurch's return after the fourth arc. Wiebe denied this and said that the collaboration not working out creatively was the reason for Fowler's departure and the comic's hiatus.

In July 2016, Wiebe announced that Rat Queens would continue as a webcomic. Early strips in this format would be drawn by Battlepug creators Mike Norton and Cecilia Dupuy.

In November 2016, Wiebe announced that Rat Queens would return to print with a new series artist, Owen Gieni.

On Reddit, Wiebe clarified that issue #16 (When Beards Collide, Part 1) would not be considered canon following the reboot. Apparently he found it too difficult to wrap that arc up and put the series back on track. He later found a way to reference #16 while writing #9 of the reboot series, but reiterated that #16 will not be collected. The reference is an Easter egg for those that read #16.

Wiebe and Gieni ended their work as the series' writer and artist in March 2019, with issue #15. A new creative team of Ryan Ferrier (writer), Priscilla Petraites (artist), and Marco Lesko (colorist) resumed work on the series in June 2019.

The storyline The God Dilemma ended the regular serialization of the series, but original creators Wiebe and Upchurch have announced they will be producing a graphic novel finale for the series tying up all remaining loose ends, giving the characters a true final send-off. This finale, titled Rat Queens: Sisters, Warriors, Queens was published in late September 2023, with Upchurch returning as its artist.

== Plot ==
The eponymous "Rat Queens" are a rambunctious party of adventurers in a medieval fantasy setting. They comprise the rockabilly elven mage Hannah, the hipster dwarven warrior Violet who shaved her beard before it became cool, the atheist human cleric Dee, who hails from a family of Lovecraftian monster cultists, and the hippie halfling (here called "smidgen") thief Betty, whose idea of a hearty meal is a bag of drugs and candy. They were later joined by Braga, a transgender Orc warrior.

The first five issues follow the group's exploits as they try to defend themselves against assassins intent on killing them and other adventuring groups that have been roughing up their home town of Palisade. The second story arc sees the Rat Queens trying to prevent a vengeful businessman from summoning Dee's people's many-tentacled gods to lay waste to Palisade. The third arc has Hannah return to her sinister alma mater after her father is arrested for attempting a coup.

== Characters ==
Hannah Vizari
A black-haired Elven necromancer who made a pact with a demon named Hazirel and was cursed by the demonic Necrius magic he bestowed upon her, which among other things made her grow horns, which she tries to hide under her haircurls. Later, the corruption causes her to be split into a good and evil half.
Violet ("Vi") Blackforge
A redhaired Dwarven fighter of the Blackforge Clan who became tired of her father's adherence to old-fashioned traditions, which disallowed Dwarven females from becoming warriors even though Violet had the talent. After beating up a guest of her father's who made a slur at her, she banished herself from the clan, cutting off her beard as a sign of rebellion against tradition, although she would let it grow back later. She has a relationship with Dave, an Orc healer, whom she later marries. Her twin brother Barrie, her rival for her father's approval even though he dearly loves his sister, later becomes the leader of a copycat imitation of Violet's team called "Cat Kings".
Dee (Delilah)
A human ex-high priestess of a monster cult who left her faith and her family after she became disillusioned with the horrors they worshipped. She still continues to use her powers, especially for healing, despite her falling-out with her dark deity. She was once married with Mezikiah, another cult member. At one point she is called into the realm of the gods and granted the powers of a dwindling deity. Although shy in social situations and gloomy about her choices in life, she loves the company of her fellow Rat Queens and will do anything to keep them safe.
Betty
A fun-loving Smidgen thief whose major vices in life are candy, hallucinogens, and large servings of alcoholic drinks. She is also a lesbian, with a long-lasting relationship with a human woman named Faeyri. Formerly called Petunia Harvestchild, she was the leader of a Robin Hood-type group called The Five Monkeys, who were framed for robbery and all - except Betty - thrown into prison; as a result, the other members of the Five Monkeys, unaware that Betty has been scapegoated, are out for revenge on her. In combat she is a vicious fighter, using her small size and agility to fullest advantage.
Braga
A huge, one-eyed transgender Orc and former member of the Peaches, another adventuring team which was wiped out during the first Rat Queens story arc. Born male and originally named Broog, Braga was the oldest child and heir to of her tribe's chieftain, but she didn't believe in her people's constant warring. Her ambitious younger brother Voon attempted a coup to eliminate her and take up the chieftainship; after her best friend and lover Kiruk was slain by Voon's minions, Braga crippled Voon in revenge and left her tribe, although Voon would later return, imbued with demonic powers, to plague Braga anew. Her transition is not shown in the books but appears to have happened in between when she left her family and when she arrived in Palisades as a mercenary. Already a good friend of the Rat Queens, she later joins them full-time in their exploits.
Madeline
The teenage daughter of a retired bard who works as a barmaid in her father's tavern. She has long admired the Rat Queens and wants to be a fighter. After Violet's marriage and subsequent retirement, she takes over as the group's apprentice fighter.

== Reception ==
Rat Queens received critical praise. It was nominated for the 2014 Eisner Award for best new series, and won the 2015 GLAAD Media Award for Outstanding Comic Book for its portrayals of LGBT characters. The first compiled volume, Rat Queens: Sass and Sorcery, was nominated for the 2015 Hugo Award for Best Graphic Story.

In Paste, Robert Tutton noted that the "rowdy, sarcastic and intensely loyal" personalities of the main characters drive the series, and praised its seamless transitions from "gore to humor, sprawling action to small personal moments", as well as artist Roc Upchurch's skill at portraying facial expressions. Augie De Blieck from Comic Book Resources appreciated the "dark, twisted, and hilarious" series for its fast pacing, Wiebe's witty (and foul-mouthed) writing, and the humanity and personality with which Upchurch infused his drawings. Writing for IGN, Benjamin Bailey described the "mix of D20 adventures and modern angst" as perfecting the formula of injecting humor and wit into sword and sorcery tropes, and praised Upchurch's "expressive and unique" character designs.

== Issues ==
Issue	Title	Release date	Story	Art	Colors	Cover
Special	Rat Queens Free Preview	Sep. 9, 2013	Kurtis J. Wiebe; Meg Dejmal	Roc Upchurch		
#1	Sass and Sorcery	Sep. 25, 2013	Kurtis J. Wiebe	Roc Upchurch		Roc Upchurch; Fiona Staples (variant)
#2	Sass and Sorcery	Oct. 23, 2013	Kurtis J. Wiebe	Roc Upchurch		
#3	Sass and Sorcery	Nov. 27, 2013	Kurtis J. Wiebe	Roc Upchurch		
#4	Sass and Sorcery	Jan. 15, 2014	Kurtis J. Wiebe	Roc Upchurch		
#5	Sass and Sorcery	Feb. 26, 2014	Kurtis J. Wiebe	Roc Upchurch		
#6	The Far Reaching; Tentacles of N’Rygoth	May 7, 2014	Kurtis J. Wiebe	Roc Upchurch		
#7	The Far Reaching; Tentacles of N’Rygoth	Jul. 16, 2014	Kurtis J. Wiebe	Roc Upchurch		
#8	The Far Reaching; Tentacles of N’Rygoth	Oct. 1, 2014	Kurtis J. Wiebe	Roc Upchurch		Tyler Jenkins; Michael Avon Oeming (v.)
Special	Braga: The Once Prince, Now Bastard	Jan. 14, 2015	Kurtis J. Wiebe	Tess Fowler	Kelly Fitzpatrick	Tess Fowler; Roc Upchurch (v.)
#9	The Far Reaching; Tentacles of N’Rygoth	Mar. 4, 2015	Kurtis J. Wiebe	Stjepan Šejić		Jenny Frison
#10	The Far Reaching; Tentacles of N’Rygoth	Apr. 8, 2015	Kurtis J. Wiebe	Stjepan Šejić		
#11	Demons	Aug. 19, 2015	Kurtis J. Wiebe	Tess Fowler	Tamra Bonvillain	Stjepan Šejić
#12	Demons	Sep. 16, 2015	Kurtis J. Wiebe	Tess Fowler	Tamra Bonvillain	Stjepan Šejić
#13	Demons	Nov. 18, 2015	Kurtis J. Wiebe	Tess Fowler	Tamra Bonvillain	Stjepan Šejić
#14	Demons	Dec. 30, 2015	Kurtis J. Wiebe	Tess Fowler	Tamra Bonvillain	Stjepan Šejić
#15	Demons	Mar. 16, 2016	Kurtis J. Wiebe	Tess Fowler	Tamra Bonvillain	Stjepan Šejić
#16	When Beards Collide	May 4, 2016	Kurtis J. Wiebe	Tess Fowler	Tamra Bonvillain	Tess Fowler and Tamra Bonvillain
“SOFT REBOOT”
#1	Cat Kings and Other Garys	Mar. 1, 2017	Kurtis J. Wiebe	Owen Gieni		
#2	Cat Kings and Other Garys	Apr. 12, 2017	Kurtis J. Wiebe	Owen Gieni		
#3	Cat Kings and Other Garys	May 24, 2017	Kurtis J. Wiebe	Owen Gieni		
#4	Cat Kings and Other Garys	Jul. 5, 2017	Kurtis J. Wiebe	Owen Gieni		
#5	Cat Kings and Other Garys	Aug. 16, 2017	Kurtis J. Wiebe	Owen Gieni		
Special	Orc Dave	Sept. 27, 2017	Kurtis J. Wiebe	Max Dunbar	Tamra Bonvillain	Fiona Staples
#6	The Colossal Magic Nothing	Nov. 22, 2017	Kurtis J. Wiebe	Owen Gieni		Owen Gieni; Sweeney Boo (v.)
#7	The Colossal Magic Nothing	Jan. 3, 2018	Kurtis J. Wiebe	Owen Gieni		Owen Gieni; Jim Valentino (v.)
#8	The Colossal Magic Nothing	Feb. 28, 2018	Kurtis J. Wiebe	Owen Gieni		Owen Gieni; Mindy Lee (v.)
#9	The Colossal Magic Nothing	May 16, 2018	Kurtis J. Wiebe	Owen Gieni		Owen Gieni; Leila Del Duca (v.)
#10	The Colossal Magic Nothing	Jul. 11, 2018	Kurtis J. Wiebe	Owen Gieni		Owen Gieni; Joseph Michael Linsner (v.)
Special	Neon Static	Jul. 18, 2018	Kurtis J. Wiebe	Will Kirkby		
#11	The Infernal Path	Sep. 12, 2018	Kurtis J. Wiebe	Owen Gieni		
#12	The Infernal Path	Oct. 24, 2018	Kurtis J. Wiebe	Owen Gieni		
#13	The Infernal Path	Dec. 19, 2018	Kurtis J. Wiebe	Owen Gieni		
#14	The Infernal Path	Feb. 13, 2019	Kurtis J. Wiebe	Owen Gieni		
#15	The Infernal Path	Mar. 13, 2019	Kurtis J. Wiebe	Owen Gieni		
Special	Swamp Romp	Apr. 10, 2019	Ryan Ferrier	Priscilla Petraites	Marco Lesko	Priscilla Petraites
#16	The Once and Future King	Jun. 19, 2019	Ryan Ferrier	Priscilla Petraites	Marco Lesko	Priscilla Petraites
#17	The Once and Future King	Jul. 31, 2019	Ryan Ferrier	Priscilla Petraites	Marco Lesko	Priscilla Petraites
#18	The Once and Future King	Sep. 11, 2019	Ryan Ferrier	Priscilla Petraites	Marco Lesko	Priscilla Petraites
#19	The Once and Future King	Oct. 23, 2019	Ryan Ferrier	Priscilla Petraites	Marco Lesko	Priscilla Petraites
#20	The Once and Future King	Dec. 11, 2019	Ryan Ferrier	Priscilla Petraites	Marco Lesko	Priscilla Petraites
#21	The God Dilemma	Mar. 25, 2020	Ryan Ferrier	Priscilla Petraites	Marco Lesko	Priscilla Petraites
#22	The God Dilemma	Oct. 21, 2020	Ryan Ferrier	Moritat & Casey Silver		Priscilla Petraites & Marco Lesko
#23	The God Dilemma	Nov. 25, 2020	Ryan Ferrier	Moritat & Casey Silver		Priscilla Petraites & Marco Lesko
#24	The God Dilemma	Jan. 6, 2021	Ryan Ferrier	Moritat & Casey Silver		Priscilla Petraites & Marco Lesko
#25	The God Dilemma	Feb. 3, 2021	Ryan Ferrier	Moritat & Casey Silver		Roc Upchurch
Special	Sisters, Warriors, Queens	Sep. 27, 2023	Kurtis J. Wiebe	Roc Upchurch		

=== Webcomics ===
To promote the return of Rat Queens, Kurtis Wiebe ran a series of webcomics on his blog. The first 10 comics were later released as a digital comic issue.

#	Title	Release date	Story	Art	Colors
#1	"Magesitting"	Nov. 23, 2016	Kurtis Wiebe	Mike Norton	Sweeney Boo
#2	"Goodbye"	Nov. 30, 2016	Kurtis Wiebe	Isaac Goodhart	
#3	"Trippin’"	Dec. 7, 2016	Kurtis Wiebe	Sweeney Boo	
#4	"Social Warrior"	Dec. 14, 2016	Kurtis Wiebe	Justin Osterling	
#5	"Whackball"	Dec. 21, 2016	Kurtis Wiebe	Max Dunbar	Sweeney Boo
#6	"The Absent King"	Jan. 11, 2017	Kurtis Wiebe	Ben Rankel	
#7	"Rat Queens Inc."	Jan. 18, 2017	Kurtis Wiebe	Kyle Charles	Sweeney Boo
#8	"Bedtime Stories with Braga"	Jan. 25, 2017	Kurtis Wiebe	Will Kirkby	
#9	"Girls’ Night Out"	Feb. 1, 2017	Kurtis Wiebe	Stjepan Šejić	
#10	"Bad Omen"	Feb. 10, 2017	Kurtis Wiebe	Sedona Parnham	
#11	"Identity"	Mar. 22, 2017	Kurtis Wiebe	Linda Šejić	

== Collected editions ==
The series is collected into trade paperbacks and deluxe hardcovers. Wiebe originally stated that Rat Queens #16 would never be collected. Weibe commented on Reddit: "I hated that issue. It was a reminder of how bad things had gotten creatively." However in 2023 Wiebe announced on Facebook that it would finally be collected in the Rat Queens Omnibus, to be published later in 2023.

=== Trade paperbacks ===
Trade paperbacks
Title	Release date	Collects	Cover	ISBN
Rat Queens, Volume 1 Sass and Sorcery	March 26, 2014	Rat Queens #1–5	Fiona Staples	9781607069454
Rat Queens, Volume 2 The Far Reaching Tentacles of N’Rygoth	May 6, 2015	Rat Queens #6–10	Stjepan Sejic	9781632150400
Rat Queens, Volume 3 Demons	April 13, 2016	Rat Queens #11–15; Braga #1	Tess Fowler and Tamra Bonvillain	9781632157355
Rat Queens, Volume 4 High Fantasies	October 11, 2017	Rat Queens Vol. 2 #1–5	Owen Gieni	9781632158994
Rat Queens, Volume 5 The Colossal Magic Nothing	July 25, 2018	Rat Queens Vol. 2 #6–10; Orc Dave	Owen Gieni	9781534306776
Rat Queens, Volume 6 The Infernal Path	May 15, 2019	Rat Queens Vol. 2 #11–15; Neon Static	Owen Gieni	9781534310698
Rat Queens, Volume 7 The Once and Future King	February 12, 2020	Rat Queens Vol. 2 #16–20; Swamp Romp	Marco Lesko and Priscilla Petraites	9781534314665
Rat Queens, Volume 8 The God Dilemma	April, 2021	Rat Queens Vol. 2 #21-25	Marco Lesko and Priscilla Petraites	9781534316720

=== Deluxe hardcover edition ===
While Wiebe considers Rat Queens, Volume 3: Demons canon, he said he would not collect the arc in the deluxe hardcovers because of his falling out with the artist, Tess Fowler. However this decision has been reversed and the arc will be included in the Rat Queens Omnibus.

Deluxe hardcovers
Title	Release date	Collects	ISBN
Rat Queens Deluxe Edition, Volume 1	December 2, 2015	Rat Queens #1–10; Braga #1	9781632154927
Rat Queens Deluxe Edition, Volume 2	November 20, 2018	Rat Queens Vol. 2 #1–10; Orc Dave #1	9781534310254
Rat Queens Deluxe Edition, Volume 3	November 17, 2021	Rat Queens Vol. 2 #11–20; Neon Static	9781534320451

== Other media ==
=== TV adaptation ===
In 2014, Pūkeko Pictures and Heavy Metal magazine announced their intent to adapt Rat Queens as a 30-minute animated television series. There has been no news since then.

=== Dungeons & Dragons ===
Issue #14 of the digital Dungeons & Dragons' magazine Dragon+ features The Hangover, a role-playing adventure written by Kurtis Wiebe.

=== Roleplaying stream ===
Since 2019, the Twitch channel "Hyper Rabbit Power Go" (Hyper RPG) is streaming a tabletop RPG series based on Rat Queens. Participants include Emily Jacobson as the game master, Jessica Lynn Verdi as Hannah, Laurie Jones as Violet, Aliza Pearl as Dee, Michelle Nguyen Bradley as Betty, and Riley Silverman as Braga.
