= Revival (comics) =

American horror comics series by Tim Seeley and Mike Norton

- Cover of Revival #1 (July 2012) by Jenny Frison.

Publication information
- Publisher: Image Comics
- Schedule: Monthly
- Format: Ongoing
- Genre: Horror
- Publication date: July 2012 – February 2017
- No. of issues: 47

Creative team
- Created by: Tim Seeley and Mike Norton
- Written by: Tim Seeley
- Artist: Mike Norton
- Letterer: Crank!
- Colorist: Mark Englert

Revival is an American horror comics series created by writer Tim Seeley and artist Mike Norton. The pair worked with colorist Mark Englert and cover artist Jenny Frison to produce the series, which was published by Image Comics as 47 monthly issues released between July 2012 and February 2017. It has since been reprinted in both paperback and hardcover editions that contain multiple issues.

Set in central Wisconsin, Revival follows the aftermath of the dead coming back to life. The story is centered on detective Dana Cypress and her revived sister Em as it touches on religious, moral and social themes. As they investigate, they find Em's murder to be closely linked to the revival. Although the creators always knew how the central mystery would conclude, the exact length of the series was determined by sales.

The series has received mostly positive reviews and sold through multiple printings. Revival was nominated for three Harvey Awards in 2013, and Frison was nominated in the Best Cover Artist category in 2013 and 2015 in part because of her work on the series. Critics praised the series for being distinct from other zombie comics, but later faulted the story's pace and sprawling cast. By the end of the series, sales of individual monthly issues had fallen nearly 78% from the first-issue peak.

In late 2012, Seeley and Norton were approached by major networks to develop Revival into a television series. While similar projects were produced at that time, none were based on Revival. A film adaptation was announced in early 2017, to be co-written by Seeley and produced by Shatterglass Films. Diamond Select Toys has released a minimate toy of Em Cypress.

== Plot summary ==
In what becomes known as Revival Day, everyone who died within a few miles of Wausau, Wisconsin, on January 1 returns to life on January 2. The Centers for Disease Control (CDC) quarantines the area to study the phenomenon and search for a cause. A partnership between the local sheriff's office and the CDC creates a task force to process any crime that involves one of the twenty-three known "revivers" (people who came back to life). It is led by detective Dana Cypress and CDC doctor Ibrahim Ramin. Dana learns her college-aged sister, Em, is also a reviver. Em was murdered, but cannot remember the events leading to her death. Dana agrees to keep Em's status a secret while they investigate her death. Meanwhile, various townspeople begin to see glowing ghost-like figures in the surrounding woods (referred to as "creeps" in writer Tim Seeley's scripts).

Em is attacked by one of the creeps known as "glowing men". Art by Mike Norton and Mark Englert.

The revivers are immortal and heal from all wounds. Some of them begin to take physical and non-physical risks because they do not fear physical or emotional harm to themselves or others. When they experience strong negative emotions, they cry blood and become violent. As a result, Dana and Ramin investigate several murders in the weeks following Revival Day. Meanwhile, some people outside the quarantine area believe the government is covering up a religious miracle. Others believe they can absorb the revivers' immortality by ingesting their flesh, leading to an active smuggling business that moves body parts of revivers and other recently dead individuals.

Some CDC researchers discover high levels of heavy water in creeks surrounding Wausau. As a precaution, they confiscate and slaughter all the local livestock. Edmund Holt, a local man paranoid about government overreach, organizes a group to resist what he believes are unlawful actions. At the same time, he oversees a tunnel that smuggles sick Christians who believe being baptized in the water will heal their ailments. Meanwhile, Em discovers she is pregnant.

Secretly, the CDC uses a former dairy farm to detain revivers who have been reported as dangerous. When its existence is discovered, it causes a rift between the CDC and sheriff's office generally, and between Dana and Ramin specifically. The Wausau mayor organizes a meeting to reconcile the issues and invites some revivers to participate. Holt uses a suicidal reviver to smuggle a bomb into the meeting. It kills the mayor and several other people. General Louise Cale is installed as a temporary governor and uses her power to move all known revivers to the dairy farm facility. She and the military experiment on the revivers and captured creeps. They learn the ghost figures are the disembodied souls of the revivers, and that reuniting them causes permanent death.

During the response to the bombing, Em's reviver status is discovered and she is confined to the dairy farm. Following a lead, Dana learns that Em's murderer has bribed a guard at the facility to abduct Em to prevent a formal investigation into her death. Dana arrives in time to save Em and escape. Because they are unable to leave the quarantine, they go into hiding.

As tensions mount between the military and the people of Wausau, a riot is started at a picket line. The revivers and the creeps escape the dairy farm and attack the military. Creeps are able to possess bodies, prompting a shoot-on-sight response from panicked soldiers.

Dana discovers Em was killed by Lester Majak, an aging local celebrity. Majak was a physical trainer who was convinced his fitness regime would extend his life. When he began to notice his growing frailty, he researched a legend of immortality from India. A particular creek near Wausau met the requirements for the legend, and Majak murdered Em near it in a ritual to extend his life. However, Em's recent pregnancy provided additional life force and caused an imbalance that resulted in Revival Day. The imbalance is still affecting the river, and will grow to threaten all life on Earth. To restore balance, Em must give birth before she reunites with her soul and permanently dies. As she delivers her daughter, the remaining revivers merge with their souls as well.

Two years later, life in Wausau has returned to normal. Dana is now sheriff and is in a relationship with Ramin. They are raising Dana's niece.

== Composition and development ==
=== Early inspiration ===
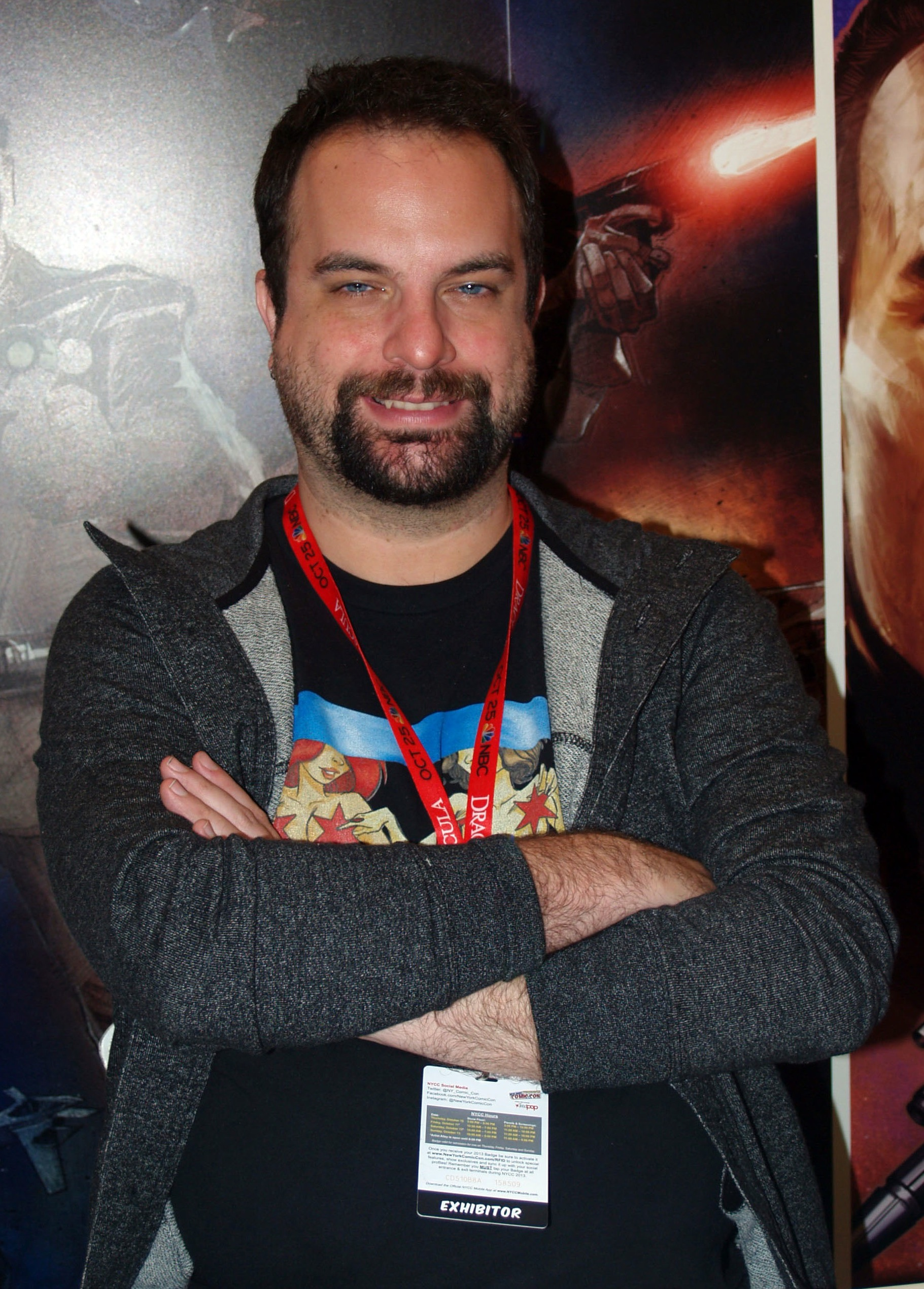
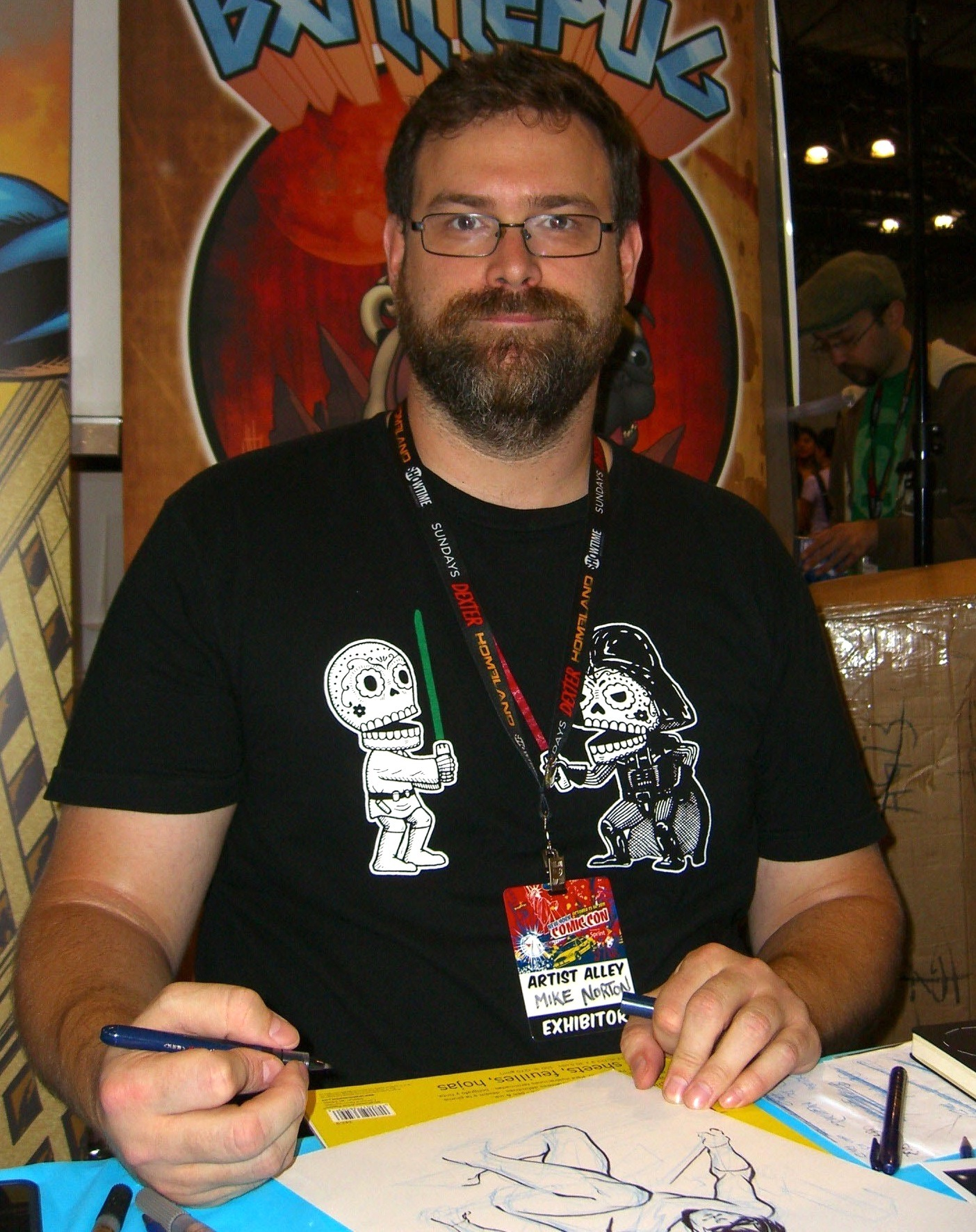
Writer Tim Seeley (left) and artist Mike Norton (right) at the 2011 New York Comic Con

Seeley and artist Mike Norton first met in 2001, when they were both hired by Devil's Due Publishing to work on a G.I. Joe comic book. The two became friends and collaborated on other works, including some released through the Double Feature app in 2011. They subsequently shared work space at Four Star Studios in Chicago, Illinois.

Following the success of Seeley's series Hack/Slash through Image Comics, publisher Eric Stephenson suggested Seeley write another monthly book. Seeley knew he wanted to work with Norton again, and the two discussed ideas over the following months, mostly during lunch breaks. Seeley was interested in setting a story in a small town so he could write about the kind of crimes that happen in a place where people prefer to live far away from each other. Norton was interested in telling a new kind of zombie story, since he felt The Walking Dead had perfected the zombie survival story. They combined the two ideas to create the premise for Revival. They pitched the series as Fargo meets The Walking Dead, using the terms "Rural Noir" and "Farm Noir" to describe the hardboiled detective story set in a small town.

The series was formally announced on March 31, 2012, at Emerald City Comicon. In the week leading up to the series announcement, Image teased the release in the form of fake newspaper articles and ads.

=== Production ===
Seeley and Norton both had heavy workloads when they began Revival, and the complexity of the story meant they needed to cut back on other projects. Because Seeley was excited to write about "real people" instead of typical heroes or archetypes, Revival is set in Seeley's boyhood home of Wausau, Wisconsin. Several of the unusual crimes in the first arc are based on actual events from the town, including the killing of the zebra-horse in the first issue. This setting meant religion would need to play a significant role in the plot because Wausau is a "very religious ... predominantly Christian" place. Seeley deliberately references Biblical events throughout the comic, but tries to do so with subtlety because it is "easy to do it way overdone".

Both Seeley and Norton are writers as well as artists, so each contributed to character designs and plot ideas. When promoting the series prior to release, Norton described Revival as the closest collaboration he had ever worked on. One character in particular, Em Cypress, had been a work in progress for nearly 20 years. She began as a sketch Seeley did in 1996 and was heavily influenced by The Crow. He continued to tweak the character over the years, and a version of her was pitched to Tokyopop for an original English-language manga in 2005. He also considered using her in Hack/Slash, but the initial concept underwent significant changes and eventually became the character Acid Angel.

The conclusion of the series was determined from the outset, but the path to the finale was adaptable and there were enough ideas to keep the comic going for as long as sales would support it. Only a few of the characters had predetermined storylines, and the supporting cast provided further subplots along the way. When issue 17 was published, the plot was "loosely" planned through 55 or 60 issues. By late 2015, they had decided to end Revival at issue 48.

Although most modern comics are told in three to six issue "arcs" that form a nearly complete story, Seeley feels that when several plot points climax at once, it provides readers an easy opportunity to quit reading without feeling dissatisfied about missing the true conclusion. For Revival, he and Norton decided to have new mysteries develop constantly. They had several discussions on the right point to begin the story. Early drafts of the first issue included scenes showing the worldwide response to Revival Day, but they were cut to focus on the people of Wausau. The creators decided to start the story after Revival Day partly because they wanted readers to relate to the cast's confusion, and partly as an homage to old superhero comics that told origin stories as quickly as possible to get to the action. They were inspired by Don DeLillo's novel White Noise, which follows people trying to escape an approaching cloud but no one knows what it actually is.

During the series, Norton and Seeley worked with colorist Mark Englert, letterer Christopher Crank (credited as "Crank!"), and cover artist and fellow studio partner Jenny Frison. Although the team planned for Frison to create the covers from the beginning, Norton provided the design for the cover of the first issue. At Seeley's suggestion, Norton drew the covers for the collected paperback editions. When the script for issue twelve called for a young character to draw his own comic within the story, five of the pages featured art by Art Baltazar and the cover was drawn by Skottie Young. Both artists are known for their cartoon-like style.

A one-shot crossover between Revival and Chew was announced on February 12, 2014, and released on May 28, 2014. The idea was proposed by Chew writer John Layman, but was initially opposed by all the other creators. Layman continued to push the concept, and eventually wrote the story anyway. He emailed it to Seeley, Norton, and Chew artist Rob Guillory, and after reading it they all agreed to participate. It was constructed as a double-sided book with two stories, one by each creative team. The chapter by Layman and Guillory was titled Chew / Revival, and the chapter by Seeley and Norton was titled Revival / Chew.

== Release and reception ==
=== Publication history ===
Previews of the first issue were included in The Walking Dead #99 and alongside five other upcoming comics in Image's 2012 Free Comic Book Day sampler before the first issue was released on July 11, 2012. It had an initial print run of about 18,000 copies and was available with two covers: the standard version by Frison and a 1-in-10 alternate cover by Craig Thompson. As an added incentive to retailers who normally order on a non-returnable basis, unsold copies of qualifying orders could be returned to Image in exchange for a credit to their account. It quickly sold out at the distributor level and went through at least four printings by December 2012, including one as part of the "Image Firsts" line of $1 reprints in November. By the end of the year, the first issue had sold an estimated 29,100 copies.

The Em Cypress minimate

Subsequent issues also performed well, requiring additional printings to satisfy demand. The series took a planned one-month hiatus after the fifth issue, which also needed a reprint, to release the first paperback collection. During the break, Image offered an extra 10% discount to retailers who increased their orders by 125% in an effort to bring orders in line with demand and eliminate the costs associated with additional printings. In January 2013, the Phantom group, retailers who commission exclusive covers to provide further attention to series they believe deserve more support, selected Revival to be part of the project. Under the Phantom label, the first ten issues were reprinted with new interlocking cover art by Frison. They were available only at stores operated by the retail group. When asked about the book's success in a January 2014 interview, Seeley said "We live and die by word-of-mouth, and so far, the readers and the comic press have been great about spreading the word about our very unusual and unique comic book."

Sales fell to just under 14,000 by issue 12, and continued to fall during the series' second year until the 24th issue sold just more than 9,000 copies. In December 2015, the 35th issue sold an estimated 6,500 copies. According to Dave Carter, a writer for The Beat, this sales pattern was typical for comics at the time. The series concluded with issue 47 in February 2017, which had estimated sales of about 6,300. Because of the decline in Revival's sales, Seeley expressed skepticism about doing another project of similar length in the future.

During publication, some Revival merchandise was offered by third-parties. On October 25, 2014, Screen Panel released four art prints based on the series created by Angela An, Randy Ortiz, and Frison. In 2016, an Em Cypress minimate figure was included in the first wave of the Comic Book Heroes series from Diamond Select Toys. The figure was available in a two pack with Cassie Hack, another Tim Seeley creation.

The series was collected into eight paperback volumes and four larger-sized hardcover editions. Seeley described the sales of the collections as "steady", with new monthly orders for the first paperback near 500 as late as 2015. Print translations of Revival were available in French and Polish, and a digital edition was released in German by Cross Cult in 2016.

=== Collected editions ===
Title	Material collected	Publication date	ISBN
Trade paperback
Revival – Vol. 1: You're Among Friends	Revival #1–5	December 12, 2012	978-1-60706-659-0
Revival – Vol. 2: Live Like You Mean It	Revival #6–11	July 17, 2013	978-1-60706-754-2
Revival – Vol. 3: A Faraway Place	Revival #12–17	February 19, 2014	978-1-60706-860-0
Revival – Vol. 4: Escape to Wisconsin	Revival #18–23; Revival / Chew (Revival creators' half)	September 24, 2014	978-1-63215-012-7
Revival – Vol. 5: Gathering of Waters	Revival #24–29	May 13, 2015	978-1-63215-379-1
Revival – Vol. 6: Thy Loyal Sons & Daughters	Revival #30–35	December 30, 2015	978-1-63215-472-9
Revival – Vol. 7: Forward	Revival #36–41	September 7, 2016	978-1-5343-0106-1
Revival – Vol. 8: Stay Just a Little Bit Longer	Revival #42–47	April 19, 2017	978-1-5343-0056-9
Hardcover
Revival – Vol. 1	Revival #1–11	October 30, 2013	978-1-60706-814-3
Revival – Vol. 2	Revival #12–23; Revival / Chew	December 3, 2014	978-1-63215-102-5
Revival – Vol. 3	Revival #24–35	January 20, 2016	978-1-63215-540-5
Revival – Vol. 4	Revival #36–47	May 31, 2017	978-1-5343-0042-2

=== Reviews ===
On release, Revival was part of a resurgence in genre comics and was highlighted for standing out among the large number of zombie comics being published at the time. Rich Johnston went further, saying it distinguished itself from traditional horror stories in general with "compelling psychological themes, undercurrents of religious fervour, and a slick medical detective veneer". Writing for Newsarama, Ernie Estrella said Norton's artwork set Revival apart because it did not rely on distressed visuals and shadows to set the atmosphere. In a review of 2012 in comics for USA Today, Brian Truitt called Revival the year's best horror comic.

In early reviews, both the art and the writing were praised. The series' specific focus on non-white people, such as the Hmong and Native Americans who live in the area, was appreciated by reviewer Ginnis Tonic. Slate columnist Dan Kois described the series as "grounded in the economic and familial realities of small-town life". Truitt found the mood and themes to be a mix of Elmore Leonard and the Coen brothers, while Kois described Norton's art as "wonderfully specific and evocative of the rural Midwest". Englert's contributions were singled out by Comic Book Resources' Doug Zawisza, who thought the colors added an "edginess" to the story. Zawisza also liked the way Norton used a variety of body shapes and sizes for the cast. Norton included subtle background details, such as music posters and the cleanliness of bedrooms, which was noted by reviewers. Tonic found they added to her understanding of the characters, and James Fulton said touches like these excited him "like few have in comics in the last few years".

As the series progressed, some critics began to express frustration with the comic. Joe Smith, also with Inside Pulse, found the large cast was difficult to track by the fourth issue. In a review of issue 33, Fulton found the series entertaining, but sometimes thought the plot felt directionless. Not all agreed; Paste included the comic book in its list of favorite horror comics in late 2016.

The conclusion of the series received mostly positive reviews. Kat Calamia found the series had a "bittersweet ending that brings ... great closure to character arcs" and called it "a satisfying conclusion for longtime readers" in her review of the final issue for Newsarama. James Ferguson agreed in his review for Horror Talk, emphasizing the creators' success at ending "every plot thread that has been hanging out there in a satisfying manner". William Kulesa, writing for NJ.com, said that while he had enjoyed the series from the beginning, the conclusion made the whole story worth reading.

=== Awards ===
Revival was nominated for three Harvey Awards in 2013: Best New Series, Best Writer, and Best Artist. Jenny Frison, who has been called the underappreciated star of the series, was nominated for Best Cover Artist in 2013 and 2015 in part because of her work on Revival.

== Adaptations ==
In October 2012, Seeley and Norton said major networks had approached them about developing a Revival television series, and later mentioned NBC specifically. Around this same time, ABC Studios was involved in a bidding war for the rights to The Returned, an unpublished novel by Jason Mott that dealt with similar themes. ABC announced they were moving forward with The Returned in January 2013, although it was later retitled Resurrection. Although some fans suspected Seeley and Norton's idea had been stolen, Seeley said "these things just happen sometimes". He said the announcement was "unfortunate" because they had been working with talented people to adapt Revival, but the television developments would have limited Seeley and Norton's creative input.

In September 2013, A&E bought the rights for an American remake of the French television series Les Revenants (The Returned), which is also about dead people coming back to life as they were before. Les Revenants, in turn, was inspired by a 2004 film of the same name directed by Robin Campillo and translated into English as They Came Back. When Seeley started working on Revival, a friend recommended he watch They Came Back to avoid similarities. Since The Returned is inspired by the film, he and Norton watched it and became fans of the show.

At the April 2017 Chicago Comic & Entertainment Expo, a film adaptation was announced. It will be co-written by Seeley and Sarah Fischer, directed by Luke Boyce and produced by Shatterglass Films, an independent film company based in Champaign, Illinois. Larger production firms also expressed interest, but Seeley would have had less input into the film if it were made by them. Boyce said he had enjoyed Revival since its debut, and had been thinking about adapting it long before he met the creators. A two-minute proof of concept teaser was shown at the expo.

Syfy gave a series order in March 2024 for a television adaptation of Revival with an intended 2025 release date. Shooting had begun by September 2024 in New Brunswick, Canada.
