= Vampire: The Masquerade (Vault Comics) =

2020 comic book series by Vault Comics

- Vampire: The Masquerade #1 cover art by Aaron Campbell, featuring the character Cecily Bain

Publication information
- Publisher: Vault Comics
- Schedule: Monthly
- Format: Ongoing series
- Genre: Horror; Vampire
- Publication date: August 5, 2020 – present
- No. of issues: 10
- Main characters: Cecily Bain; Colleen Pendergrass's coterie

Creative team
- Written by: Tim Seeley; Tini Howard; Blake Howard
- Artists: Devmalya Pramanik; Nathan Gooden; David W. Mack; Aaron Campbell
- Letterer: AndWorld
- Colorist: Addison Duke

Vampire: The Masquerade is a monthly horror comic book published by Vault Comics since 2020. It is based on the tabletop role-playing game of the same name, and is part of the larger World of Darkness series. The series is written by Tim Seeley, Tini Howard and Blake Howard, with art by Devmalya Pramanik, Nathan Gooden, David W. Mack and Aaron Campbell, coloring by Addison Duke, and lettering by AndWorld.

The comic includes two connected stories, set in Minneapolis–Saint Paul in Minnesota: "Winter's Teeth", which follows the vampire enforcer Cecily Bain, who takes in the abandoned younger vampire Alejandra; and "The Anarch Tales", which follows a coterie of anarch vampires tasked with investigating a murder. The critical response has been positive, particularly towards the artwork and coloring, and it was nominated for an Eisner Award for its lettering. World of Darkness: Crimson Thaw, a cross-over with the tabletop game Werewolf: The Apocalypse, premiered in 2021.

== Premise ==
Vampire: The Masquerade is an ongoing horror comic book series, which contains two concurrent stories that connect with each other. The series is set in Minneapolis–Saint Paul in Minnesota, in the World of Darkness – a fictionalized gothic-punk interpretation of the modern world, where immortal vampires called Kindred exist. For their own safety, they keep their existence secret from humans; this practice is called the Masquerade, and is enforced by the vampire sect the Camarilla.

The first story, "Winter's Teeth", follows the vampire Cecily Bain, an enforcer and courier in Minneapolis, working for the Twin Cities Camarilla under Prince Samantha Merrain. Cecily cares for and visits her aging human sister Karen, whose dementia may have been partially caused by Cecily's ability to cloud minds, which Cecily uses to keep Karen from knowing about vampires. Cecily takes in the younger vampire Alejandra, who was abandoned by her sire – the vampire that turned her – and gets drawn into a conspiracy as the local vampire community starts to break apart.

The second story, "The Anarch Tales", follows a coterie of anarch vampires outside the city, with members of different clans and vampiric generation: Colleen Pendergrass, whose thin-blood nature makes her more vulnerable than the rest, but resistant to daylight; Mitch Pendergrass, her estranged husband and sire; King Rat, a young man of clan Nosferatu, who Colleen dotes on as a mother; and Priscilla, the newest member of the coterie and a confidant of Colleen's. The group only tries to get by, but is tasked with investigating a murder.

== Production and release ==
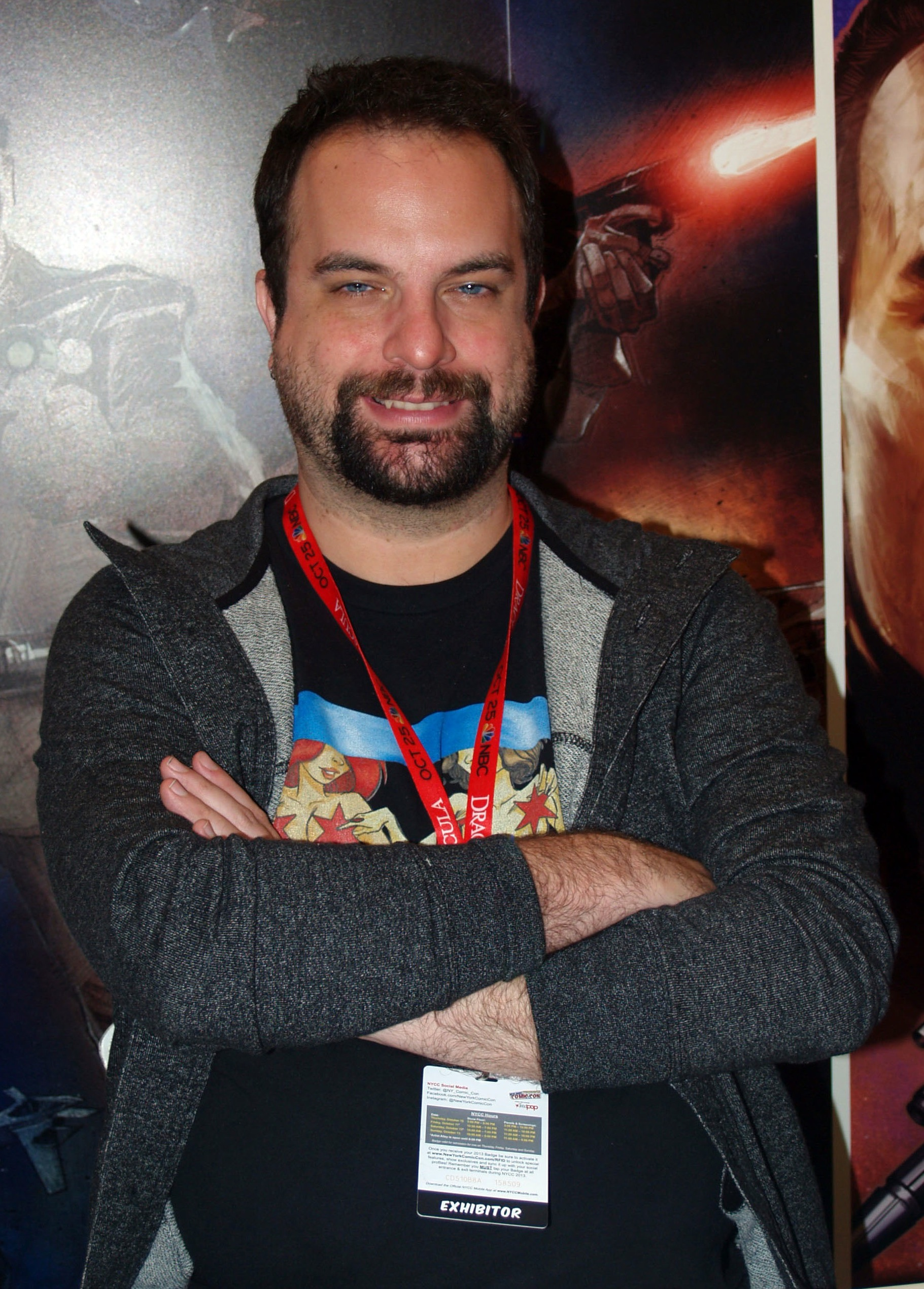
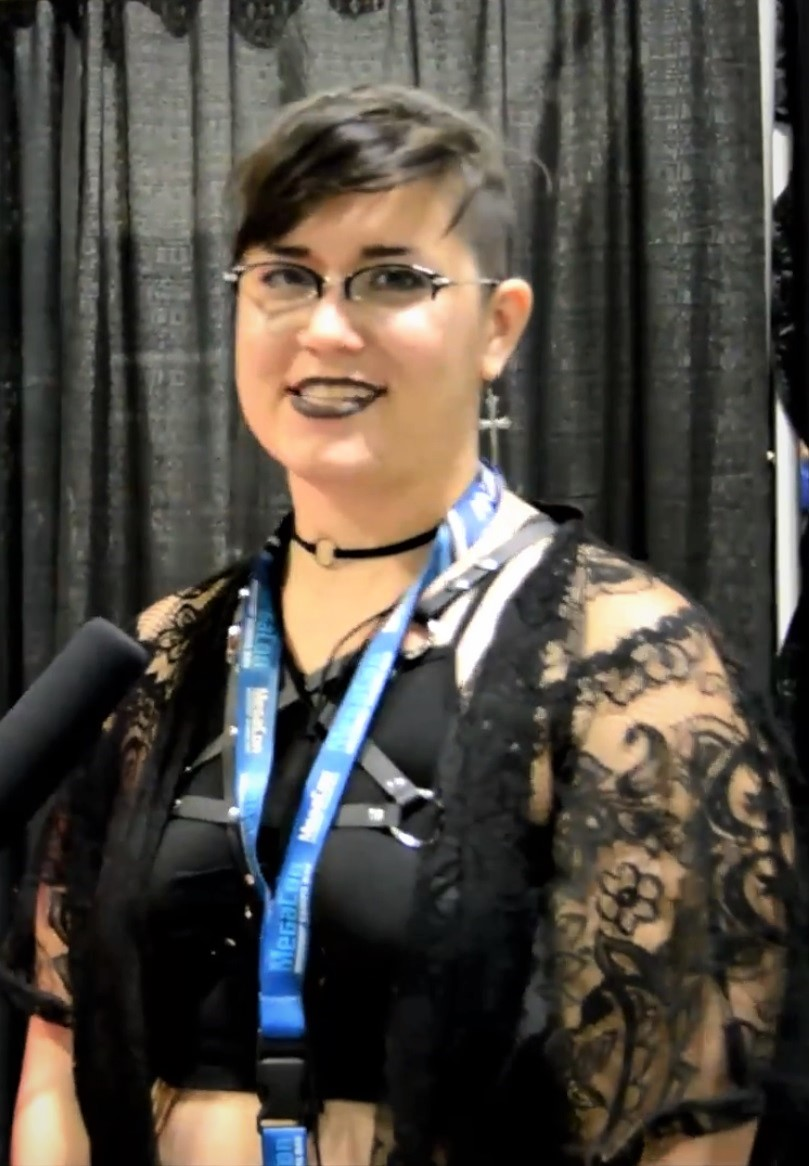
The writing team includes Tim Seeley (left), Tini Howard (right), and Blake Howard.

The comic book is published by Vault Comics, and is based on the tabletop role-playing game Vampire: The Masquerade. The creative team includes writers Tim Seeley and husband-and-wife duo Blake and Tini Howard, artists Devmalya Pramanik, Nathan Gooden, David W. Mack and Aaron Campbell, colorist Addison Duke, and letterer AndWorld. Although they collaborate on the series, some of the team is split between the two stories: Seeley and Pramanik work on "Winter's Teeth", while the Howards and Gooden work on "The Anarch Tales"; the cover artworks are drawn by Gooden, Mack and Campbell. Several of them had worked together before on other comic projects, and Seeley contacted Tini because the two had previously worked on Hack/Slash together; she, in turn, reached out to Blake due to his experience with the tabletop role-playing game.

The Howards wrote "The Anarch Tales" based on what they found the most interesting in Vampire: The Masquerade, and thought made for the most interesting stories: the mundane existence of vampires, with smaller-scale questions such as how a vampire mother cares for her human children, or how they pay the bills. They structured the story to have each chapter focus on one member of the coterie – how they became a vampire and how vampirism affects them – and showing how no two vampires have the same experience. Seeley wrote the characters in "Winter's Teeth" to be typical of their respective clans, while also feeling like individuals; he noted that he found the Camarilla structure more interesting than the clans.

The comic book was announced by Vault Comics in March 2020, and premiered on August 5, 2020, being released on a monthly basis; after the end of the first story arc in issue 5, the series went on a hiatus, and continued in March 2021 with the second arc. In addition to the standard releases, the issues are also released with cover art variants by Mack, which in turn are printed in both full-color and "blood red" variants. Each issue also includes role-playing game materials based on elements from the comic, such as character sheets, for use with the fifth edition of the Vampire: The Masquerade tabletop game.

World of Darkness: Crimson Thaw, a three-issue spin-off comic, is planned to premiere in September 2021. It is a cross-over with Werewolf: The Apocalypse – another tabletop game in the same series – and follows the conflict between vampires and werewolves in Minneapolis–Saint Paul. Tim Seeley and Blake and Tini Howard are returning to write it together with Danny Lore and Jim Zub, while it is drawn by Julius Ohta and colored by Duke. Like the main series, it contains material for the Vampire: The Masquerade game.

=== Collected editions ===
No.	Release date	ISBN
1	March 10, 2021	978-1-939424-80-8
Collects issue #1–5
2	November 9, 2021	978-1-638490-02-9
Collects issue #6–10

== Reception ==
Critical response to the series has been positive according to the review aggregator Comic Book Roundup; Bleeding Cool called it one of their favorite comic books of 2020, and Comic Book Resources ranked it as one of the best horror comic books of the year. It was nominated for an Eisner Award for "best lettering" of 2021.

The artwork and coloring work were frequently praised, which ComicBook.com and Syfy Wire thought was appropriately dark and moody, and well used to build mystique around the vampire lore. Comic Book Resources liked the art in both stories, enjoying how Pramanik's art in "Winter's Teeth" captures the gothic-punk grittiness of Tim Bradstreet's artwork from early editions of the tabletop game, and Gooden's more contemporary and delicate art in "The Anarch Tales".

Critics liked the writing and characters, with Syfy Wire enjoying the balance between worldbuilding and character-driven storytelling, calling it a sign of a "fun new era" of World of Darkness comic adaptations; ComicBook.com found the characters in "The Anarch Tales" immediately interesting, and said that the series has promise, but thought that the limited page count prevented it from getting to the heart of the story in issue 1, with not enough reason yet for the reader to care about Cecily. Bleeding Cool appreciated how the series expands the Vampire: The Masquerade mythology with subversive and engaging characters, and called "Winter's Teeth" a "triumphant return to horror" for Seeley since his earlier works Hack/Slash and Revival.

Critics were varied in their opinion on the accessibility of the comic: ComicBook.com thought that it too often uses Vampire: The Masquerade terminology without enough explanation, while Black Nerd Problems and Syfy Wire considered it a good entry-point to the setting, with a well explained premise and a good blend of nostalgia for the World of Darkness tabletop games and a willingness to be its own thing.
