= Stray Dogs (comic) =

2021 horror comic series starring dogs

- One of several variant covers of Stray Dogs #1. Art by Trish Forstner.

Publication information
- Publisher: Image Comics
- Format: Limited series
- Genre: Psychological horror; Mystery thriller
- No. of issues: 5

Creative team
- Created by: Tony Fleecs; Trish Forstner
- Written by: Tony Fleecs
- Artist: Trish Forstner
- Colorist: Brad Simpson

Collected editions
- Stray Dogs: ISBN 978-1-53-431983-7
- Stray Dogs: Dog Days: ISBN 978-1-53-432384-1

Stray Dogs is an American horror comic series written by Tony Fleecs with art by Trish Forstner, told from the viewpoint of dogs. It was first published by Image Comics as five individual issues in 2021; a trade paperback was published in 2021.

In 2021 and 2022, a two-issue spinoff called Stray Dogs: Dog Days was released, expanding on the backstories of various dogs seen in the original series. The two issues, as well as a prologue featured in Free Comic Book Day prints of Stray Dogs #1, were collected and released in July 2022.

== Plot ==
A papillon named Sophie is taken to the veterinarian's office by her owner for a bordetella vaccination. Her owner worries that Sophie is frightened from her previous experience of getting a shot and will hold a grudge on her for this one. However, the veterinarian explains that dog memories work differently from human ones, so she will likely forget today's experience in a couple of days.

Later, Sophie is taken into a faraway house by a man. She is very afraid and confused, as she does not remember what her life was like previously or where she is going. The man leaves her with his eight other dogs, who eagerly surround the new dog. A shepherd mix named Rusty pulls her away from them and introduces her to everyone. The dogs show Sophie around the house, which is decorated with taxidermied wildlife. After she has an accident out of fear, Rusty comforts her by saying that she is safe here and the master will not abandon her like her previous owners.

Seeing Sophie hiding and shivering under a table, the man wraps her with a red scarf. Sophie sniffs the scarf, and realizes that it belonged to her owner. Sophie remembers that the man broke into her owner's house, then strangled her to death with her own scarf when she returned home. Sophie attempts to tell the other dogs that their master murdered her owner, but they do not believe her, especially Earl the hound. That night, she has a nightmare about her owner's death. When Rusty wakes her up to offer aid in figuring out the truth behind her story, Sophie does not understand what he is talking about. Rusty brings Sophie the scarf, restoring her memory.

During breakfast time, Sophie and Rusty decide to explore the master's private room while the man and one of the dogs, Aldo, are away. They enter the room, finding it full of women's clothing and various photographs of women. The man returns; while Sophie hides in a box, the man forces Rusty out and locks the door. The man works in his private room until he hears Rusty damaging objects in the living room. While he locks Rusty in the backyard shed for punishment, Sophie escapes the room. After Rusty is removed from the shed that evening, Aldo states that the man spent his day meeting a lady and taking pictures of her. Sophie asks if a photo she got from the private room was the woman; Aldo says it is not, but an Alaskan Malamute named Roxanne recognizes the woman as her owner and remembers that she was killed.

While the other dogs go inside for supper, Roxanne smells something from under the porch. She moves a shovel, causing a small door to swing open. Roxanne, Rusty, Sophie, and Victor the Dalmatian go through the door, and see piles of dirt that they suspect are graves. Roxanne begins vigorously digging despite Rusty's warning that the man is coming. When the man investigates the open door, the dogs hide in a hole until he leaves to feed the other dogs. The dirt-covered dogs reunite with the other dogs inside, having found a scrap of clothing. The dogs (except for the skeptical Earl) sniff the scrap. Victor recognizes it as part of his second owner's firefighter uniform, and remembers that the man strangled her with his bare hands while Victor was tied to a table. Victor presses the 9-1-1 button on the man's landline and has the other dogs bark to get help. Sophie watches Earl climb upstairs and warn the man by pawing at his private room door. The man comes downstairs and explains to the emergency operator that his rowdy dogs accidentally knocked the phone over. He then takes Victor out to the shed, and dogs hear a gunshot.

The next morning, the man leaves the house without feeding the dogs. Everyone except for Earl believes that Victor has been shot dead and that they are next. Earl and Sophie question each others' memories, and the other dogs turn on Earl after Sophie reveals he ratted the dogs out during their phone call and Rusty claims to remember the killing of his owner. The dogs then go to the backyard to figure out Victor's fate. They smell his blood behind the shed, and Sophie enters it, finding Victor's skinned hide. The dogs immediately try to escape, but they cannot climb over or dig under the chain link fence of the backyard. They attempt to escape through the front, but they cannot unlock the door. Earl enters the private room, remembering that the man entered his owner's room when he was a puppy and fed him treats to distract him while he strangled his owner. Earl opens a cabinet with the taxidermized heads of Victor and the dogs who Earl grew up with in the house.

The man enters his private room, loads a shotgun, and commands Earl to leave the room; instead, Earl bites the man's neck. Earl runs out and warns the others to run while Imogene the Tibetan Mastiff shoves the pursuing man. Earl breaks through the front window, allowing the others to exit the house. Sophie stays behind to look for the scarf so she does not risk forgetting again, but runs out to bite the man's leg so he stops shooting at the others. Earl runs into the highway in front of the house, getting hit by a car and causing a pile-up that forces the other cars to stop. Earl dies from his injuries, and the dogs mourn. The man bleeds to death from Earl's bite wound.

Police officers come to investigate the crash. The dogs alert a K9 to the bodies under the back porch, so the police dog leads the officers to them.

Four months later, Sophie, now having been readopted and renamed Trudy, is running at a park. She reunites with Rusty and they happily play together, neither remembering their experience in the man's house. When it is time to go home, Trudy briefly hesitates before happily leaving the park with her owners.

== Characters ==
- Sophie: a yellow papillon and the main character of the story. Though like the rest of the dogs she struggled with her memories. When she sniffs her lady's scarf it triggers her memories of that horrible night the Man killed her owner.
- Rusty: a golden-brown shepherd mix. He believes that all of the dogs at the Man's house are rescues until Sophie remembers her owner. They previously met at the dog park when the Man used Rusty (though also revealed to use other dogs) as a front to meet his victims. He used Rusty to interact with Roxanne's owner as well as Sophie's. Though Rusty does not remember his life before the Man took him, it's most likely he did belong to a woman. Rusty's photo was seen alongside the other dogs in a memoriam for the dogs and their owners.
- Roxanne: a black-and-white Alaskan Malamute. She was owned by a young lady who was grieving the loss of her mother. She first encountered the Man while she and her owner were leaving a pet grooming and supply store.
- Earl: a brown hound. He is the oldest of the dogs in the story. He was taken by the man as a puppy, and is very defensive of the man when the other dogs suspect he is a murderer. However, his trust in the man begins to erode as he remembers living in a different house with a previous owner.
- Imogene: a Tibetan Mastiff. She never talks and rarely interacts with the other dogs. As a puppy, she was very sociable and active until the man took her to his house. She was brought to the house after Earl. Its never stated but Imogene was likely traumatized by her owner's murderer and might have had a small awareness of the Man’s true nature.
- Victor: a three-legged Dalmatian. After his first owner died in a house fire, he was adopted by a firefighter. Victor at first also doesn't believe Sophie, until Roxanne finds a piece of clothing. And like Sophie, the scent triggers his memory of the night he saw the Man murder his owner. Though he tried to find a way to escape, the Man killed Victor for his actions. It's revealed in the second issue of "Stray Dogs: Dog Days," that his owner's co-workers were heartbroken over Victor's owner's death and burned the Man's house in response after the events in the final issue of the series.
- The Man: the antagonist of the story. He is a hunter, taxidermist, and serial killer who targets women with dogs. The dogs refer to him as "The Master". Little is known about him other than that he has a temper and will get violent with the dogs if provoked. It's hinted in the prequel comic "Stray Dogs: Dog Days" one motive is that he gets frustrated when the women he approaches, quickly rejects his advances.
- Gucci: a black Chinese Crested who was a social media star before the Man took her.
- Henry: a white poodle. He was once a show dog. The man targeted Henry and his owner after failing to kill a different woman when she called the police as her dog attacked the man.
- Henry: a white Bull Terrier. He is referred to as “Other Henry” by Rusty to distinguish him from Henry the poodle. He is the most oblivious of the dogs, focusing more on lost toys and sticks than the current situation. He lived with a couple and their cat that often bullied him. It's revealed after Henry is taken, the cat slept in his bed missing the family canine.
- Aldo: a brown and white mutt. Very little is known about Aldo's background. But one cover hints like Sophie and some of the other dogs saw his owner's demise.
- Killer: a pug. He previously lived with a young woman. For a time her parents were taking care of him and he was incredibly fond of both her and his owner's brother.
- Fritz: a mini German Schnauzer who appears in a prologue featured in Free Comic Book Day 2021 editions of Stray Dogs issue 1. He is the first dog the man takes and was one of the dogs Earl and Imogene grew up with. Including Imogene and Earl, the earlier dogs with Fritz was Laney and Ramon, and several unnamed dogs: a Rottweiler, a Yorkshire Terrier, a chocolate Labrador Retriever, a whippet, and another terrier (possibly a Scottish Terrier). Its never explained why at some point the Man killed him or the previous dogs with Earl and Imogene.
- Laney: A Rough Collie shown in a flashback of Earl's in Dog Days as one of the earlier dogs the Man took. She's shown like Sophie in "Stray Dogs Dog Days" issue 2 to begin remembering something was wrong with the Man. And remembered she had a female owner. According to Ramon she tended to have moments like that. Like the other dogs, the Man killed her and mounted her head on a wall in his private room.
- Ramon: A Chihuahua that was one of the earlier dogs the Man had taken. In Stray Dogs: Dog Days issue two, while the other dogs tended to Laney's distress. Ramon shrugged it off and wanted to play with Earl. Like the other dogs, at some point the Man killed him and taxidermized his head along with the other dogs.

== Reception ==
Library Journal called it a "strange and terrible tale made creepier by the cuteness of its characters", with "fine craftmanship" and a "fresh plot", but emphasizing that it is for "adult readers" despite the dogs being "almost cartoon-like, looking like they could come from a children's show".

Comic Book Resources praised it as "a well-plotted anxiety-inducing thriller", lauding Fleecs for "giv[ing] each dog a distinct personality [so that] each member of the large cast [can] play their own distinct role in the narrative", and compared Forstner's "cute, emotive [art] style" to Lady and the Tramp, while commending her depictions of violence.

The comic Feral is set in the same shared universe as Stray Dogs, starting from issue #21, where the surviving dogs return under disease-control custody.

== Canceled film adaptation ==
In September 2020, before the first issue of Stray Dogs went on sale, Paramount Animation purchased the rights to adapt it into a film. The adaptation was set to be produced by Gary Dauberman and written by Mark Perez. In August 2026, six years after the announcement, Fleecs confirmed at a convention that the film was no longer moving forward, and would go on to state that getting paid a lot for the film rights was "the only good thing about it."

== Success ==
Orders for Stray Dogs were high enough that issue #1 was reprinted four times, for a total of over 100,000 copies. Following the success of Dog Days, Fleecs launched Local Man as his second self-owned series.

== Collected editions ==
=== Trade paperbacks ===
Title	Collected material	Published date	ISBN
Stray Dogs	Stray Dogs #1–5	15 Sep 2021	9781534319837
Stray Dogs: Dog Days	Stray Dogs: Dog Days #1–2, Stray Dogs FCBD Prologue	20 Jul 2022	9781534323841
