= Grayson (comic book) =

Comic book

- The cover of Grayson #1 from July 2014. Cover by Andrew Robinson

Publication information
- Publisher: DC Comics
- Publication date: July 2014 – May 2016
- No. of issues: 20 (plus 1 One-shot and 3 Annuals)
- Main character(s): Dick Grayson / Agent 37; Helena Bertinelli / Matron

Creative team
- Created by: Tim Seeley, Tom King
- Written by: Tim Seeley, Tom King, Jackson Lanzing, Collin Kelly
- Artist(s): Mikel Janín, Stephen Mooney, Roge Antonio, Alvaro Martinez

Grayson is a 2014–2016 spy comic book ongoing series published by the comic book publishing company DC Comics about the character Dick Grayson leaving behind his superhero life to become Agent 37 of the fictional spy agency Spyral. The series was initially written by Tim Seeley and Tom King, with art by Mikel Janín and Stephen Mooney. The creative team departed the series after issue #17, with Seeley working on Nightwing and King & Janín on Batman for the impending DC Rebirth relaunch; from issue #18 onwards, the series was written by Jackson Lanzing and Collin Kelly with art by Roge Antonio.

== Publication history ==
The Grayson series follows the events of the Forever Evil crossover event which ran from September 2013 to May 2014. During the story, the Crime Syndicate publicly unmask Nightwing as Dick Grayson following which he is seemingly killed. Although revived, Batman and Dick realize that he can no longer operate as Nightwing and must maintain the façade of being dead.

The first issue was released on July 2, 2014 following the conclusion of the then-current Nightwing run, which ended at issue #30 on May 24.

== Plot ==
Following his supposed death Batman sends Dick Grayson undercover to investigate Spyral, a clandestine organization founded by Kathy Kane to spy on superheroes. Grayson is designated Agent 37 and is partnered with senior Spyral agent Helena Bertinelli, codenamed Matron. The duo are sent on missions by Spyral's enigmatic leader Mr. Minos to retrieve body parts from the recently deceased supervillain Paragon; these parts are being traded and distributed among criminals in order to give them powers. Tension arises between the two when Grayson's refusal to kill costs the lives of other agents. During a mission, Grayson fights against Midnighter, who is also keeping an eye on Spyral, causing Grayson to question the organizations purpose and motives even more. While Grayson and Bertinelli are busy with these missions, Minos, who obscures his face using nanobot technology, secretly uses Spyral's resources to uncover the secret identities of superheroes. Grayson communicates with Batman in secret using code in order to discuss his findings and, although Batman expresses concerns over his safety and wants to extract him, Grayson convinces Batman that he needs to stay undercover to find out what Spyral are really planning.

Grayson and Matron continue searching for Paragon's organs, coming into frequent conflict with Midnighter, who is trying to keep them out of Spyral's possession and has discovered that Agent 37 is actually Grayson. A cult known as the Fist of Cain manage to acquire Paragon's brain and intend to use it to unleash a psychic pulse at an Israeli peace rally, killing thousands. Grayson convinces Midnighter that they are on the same side and they successfully team up to stop the group. Minos meets with Bertinelli and shoots her with her crossbow, leading her to play dead until he leaves before making her way to Grayson. Bertinelli explains that all Spyral operatives are on missions aside from Agent 1, codenamed Tiger, and theorizes that Minos will try to kill him next. Grayson and Tiger team up to fight Minos, who has used the organs to create a new version of Paragon that has the powers of the Justice League. Using Grayson's knowledge of the League, they are able to defeat Paragon but find that Mr. Minos has escaped. In an unknown location, Minos holds a meeting with a reporter, revealing the identities of several superheroes and explaining that he joined Syral so that he could leak their secrets. The reporter, revealed to be Agent Zero, chastises Minos and kills him.

Following Minos' death, Matron takes over as the new director of Spyral and is confronted by the heads of several other spy agencies who inform her that, on each of Agent 37's five previous missions, one of their own agents has been murdered with escrima sticks. Bertinelli is suspicious, knowing that Grayson would never kill, and assumes he is being set up. Grayson attempts to contact Batman, asking when he is able to come home but receives no reply, causing him to act recklessly during a mission with Tiger to steal a necklace made of kryptonite. Grayson begins to question Bertinelli's true motivations when he discovers that he is supposed to hand the necklace to Lex Luthor and he flees. Tiger is attacked by someone who looks identical to Grayson but is saved from being murdered by the real Grayson, who initially believes his attacker to be Clayface in disguise. The two Graysons fight but Grayson is bested when the attacker distracts him by playing off his isolation from his family. Tiger regains consciousness and rips the nanobots out of his eyes, discovering that the attacker is his old partner Agent 8, whom he believed dead. Tiger lies about the identity of the attacker, blaming Maxwell Lord and Checkmate while Grayson, after another failed attempt to reach Batman, quits Spyral and heads for Gotham City. His reunion with Batman, who has lost his memory, is interrupted by Agent Zero, who demands he return to Spyral or they will reveal Batman's secret identity. Grayson meets with Jason, Tim, Barbara and Damian, with each reacting in various ways to the fact that he is alive. Knowing Spyral will be watching, he communicates with them in code and tasks them with hacking into the nanobots so that he will no longer be under Spyral's control.

Upon his return to Spyral, Bertinelli reassures Grayson that she knew he was innocent whereas Tiger's relationship with Grayson remains strained. Tim confirms the identity of Agent Zero as Luka Netz, a woman who he discovers has been watching Batman and Grayson (as Robin) for years. Pinpointing her location to Berlin, Grayson and Midnighter orchestrate a mission causing Spyral to send him there so he can investigate. Once there, Grayson discovers that Spyral’s founder (and Luka's father) Otto Netz created Spyral to deal with superhumans but, worrying that the organization would eventually stray from his original plans once he became bored and left, he also founded rival organization Leviathan to challenge them constantly. Wishing to end the cycle of violence, Grayson and Tiger go rogue and begin taking down the other Spyral agents, leading Bertinelli to send the Syndicate, a group of the world's most powerful spies, after them. In response, Grayson reaches out to Maxwell Lord and Checkmate to form an alliance.

Armed with Checkmate technology, Grayson and Tiger handily defeat Frankenstein, a member of the Syndicate before taking on Grifter. Grayson works out that Grifter is a telepath and uses his training to outsmart him and learning that the Syndicate are only working with Bertinelli so that they can eventually kill her. Grayson tries to send a warning to Bertinelli but when the Syndicate attack she believes it to be Grayson and Tiger. Bertinelli is gravely wounded before Grayson can get to her and he is forced to fight against the Syndicate while Netz takes her to the medical bay. Agent 8, revealed to be a member of Leviathan, sets off a bomb at Spyral HQ and, after subduing her, Tiger kills his former partner. Grayson calls in Midnighter, who single-handedly takes down the entire Syndicate while he goes after Bertinelli, not realizing that Otto Netz has revived himself, killed Luka and taken over Bertinelli's body. While searching for Bertinelli, Tiger reveals himself to have been working for Checkmate all along and he and Grayson fight numerous times while attempting to locate her. Maxwell Lord reveals that he created Minos and he arrives at Spyral HQ to retrieve the identities of the Justice League but the files are deleted before he can get to them. Grayson buries Tiger in an avalanche and makes his way to Otto. Grayson convinces Otto to give up Bertinelli's body and take his instead, to which he agrees. Inside his mind, Grayson manages to outwit Otto and destroys him. Bertinelli reveals Otto had programmed a Spyral satellite to erase Dick Grayson from existence so that he could fully take over his life but adds that she tweaked it so that, while most of the world would still be unaware of Grayson's existence, she and the rest of the Bat Family would remember him. Relishing his new anonymity, Grayson returns to being a superhero.

=== Return to Nightwing ===
The Spectre gathers Harley Quinn, Green Lantern, Azrael and John Constantine together to investigate the activities of a mysterious man with no face known as Agent 37, asking them to recall their meetings with him. Constantine explains that, while looking into some local disappearances, he came across a nest of vampires who were holding an attractive man captive. The man, who had no face, allowed the vampires to feed on him and, assuming he had been drained and killed, Constantine attacked the nest to gain revenge. Agent 37 suddenly awakens and reveals that his skin was coated in nanobots that he then sets alight killing the vampires before calling for Matron to retrieve him. Azrael notes a similar interaction where Agent 37 helped turn the tide of a war and Harley recounts breaking into a supervillain vault alongside him. Green Lantern describes how Agent 37 helped him destroy a collection of Parademons. Each of the group describes 37 with one word: charmer (Constantine), savior (Azrael), gymnast (Quinn) and superhero (Lantern). Spectre asks them who they believe Agent 37 is and they all remember Dick Grayson. The Spectre is revealed to be Grayson himself who, uses the nanobots to cause the group to forget all trace of him before reuniting with Bertinelli and heading for the next adventure.

Several months later, Bertinelli leaves Spyral, taking up the identity of Huntress and leaving Tiger in charge. Midnighter gives Grayson a piece of technology that allows him to save Damian's life and outwit the Court of Owls. Back in Gotham, Grayson discusses his plans with Batman, who believes that now Grayson has regained his secret identity, he should spend some time living his life. Grayson disagrees, explaining that even under his personas of the Flying Grayson, Robin, Nightwing, Batman and Agent 37, they are all still Dick Grayson. He reiterates his resolve to fight crime and protect the innocent and dons the Nightwing costume once again.

== Reception ==
The series holds an average rating of 8.1 by 301 professional critics on review aggregation website Comic Book Roundup.

A positive review of the first volume by ComicBookWire.com described the series as "a James Bond movie with a superhero flair, which is a very good thing" and adding that "besides the multitude of great plotlines running through this book, there is even more to like about the story as a whole. The spy stuff is campy and Dick is funnier than ever. It adds a comedic element to the series which contrasts perfectly with the seriousness of the situation".

A review of issue six, during which Grayson fights against Midnighter received positive reviews from critics, with Jay Yaws of BatmanNews.com remarking that "what I liked most about it was it was a battle of personalities just as much as a physical confrontation. The dialogue here is excellent, rising above the macho one-liners and grandstanding that is typical of action scenes. Instead, the rapport between the two feels like a genuine rivalry, with past encounters and grievances carrying weight for these men rather than being forgotten footnotes". He also praised the art by Janin and Cox, noting that "Janín's art is as fluid and expressive as always, but what really impresses me are his creative panel layouts. Everything flows together and feels like there's genuine motion, thanks in no small part to the beautiful coloring from Jeromy Cox", adding that "[Janin and Cox] may be one of the better illustrative teams in the industry right now".

== Prints ==
=== Issues ===
Issue	Publication Date	Writer	Artist	Colorist	Comic Book Roundup Rating	Estimated Sales
#1	July 9, 2014	Tom King	Mikel Janin	Jeromy Cox	8.1 by 38 professional critics	81,433
#2	August 6, 2014	Tim Seeley	Mikel Janin	Jeromy Cox	8.0 by 27 professional critics	56,483
#3	October 1, 2014	Tom King	Mikel Janin	Jeromy Cox	9.1 by 10 professional critics	
#4	November 5, 2014	Tom King	Mikel Janin	Jeromy Cox	7.9 by 18 professional critics	
#5	December 3, 2014	Tom King	Mikel Janin	Jeromy Cox	8.1 by 15 professional critics	
#6	January 14, 2015	Tom King	Mikel Janin	Jeromy Cox	8.1 by 15 professional critics	39,816
#7	February 4, 2015	Tom King	Mikel Janin	Jeromy Cox	8.7 by 7 professional critics	41,313
#8	March 4, 2015	Tim Seeley	Mikel Janin	Jeromy Cox	8.8 by 15 professional critics	41,911
#9	June 24, 2015	Tim Seeley	Mikel Janin	Jeromy Cox	8.2 by 16 professional critics	40,478
#10	July 22, 2015	Tim Seeley	Mikel Janin	Jeromy Cox	8.5 by 20 professional critics	34,882
#11	August 26, 2015	Tim Seeley	Mikel Janin	Jeromy Cox	8.7 by 16 professional critics	37,402
#12	September 23, 2015	Tim Seeley	Mikel Janin	Jeromy Cox	9.2 by 23 professional critics	33,281
#13	October 28, 2015	Tim Seeley	Mikel Janin	Jeromy Cox	8.1 by 14 professional critics	32,786
#14	November 25, 2015	Tom King	Mikel Janin	Jeromy Cox	8.0 by 6 professional critics	32,201
#15	December 9, 2015	Tom King	Mikel Janin	Jeromy Cox	8.9 by 11 professional critics	35,765
#16	January 27, 2016	Tim Seeley	Jeromy Cox	Jeromy Cox	9.0 by 13 professional critics	30,420
#17	February 24, 2016	Tim Seeley	Carmine Di Giandomenico	Jeromy Cox	7.0 by 10 professional critics	30,257
#18	March 23, 2016	Collin Kelly; Jackson Lanzing	Roge Antonio	Jeromy Cox	6.1 by 12 professional critics	33,550
#19	April 27, 2016	Collin Kelly; Jackson Lanzing	Roge Antonio	Jeromy Cox	7.0 by 10 professional critics	
#20	May 26, 2016	Collin Kelly; Jackson Lanzing	Roge Antonio	Jeromy Cox	7.7 by 8 professional critics	

=== Collected editions ===
Title	Material collected	Format	Released	ISBN
1	Agents Of Spyral	Grayson #1–4, Grayson: Futures End; material from Secret Origins (vol. 3) #8	Jun 9, 2015	HC: 978-1401252342
1	Agents Of Spyral	Grayson #1–4, Grayson: Futures End; material from Secret Origins (vol. 3) #8	Jan 26, 2016	TPB: 978-1401257590
2	We All Die At Dawn	Grayson #5–8, Annual #1	Feb 2, 2016	978-1401257606
3	Nemesis	Grayson #9–12, Annual #2, DC Sneak Peek: Grayson	May 24, 2016	978-1401262761
4	A Ghost In The Tomb	Grayson #13–16, Robin War #1–2	Oct 18, 2016	978-1401267629
5	Spiral's End	Grayson #17–20, Annual #3, Nightwing: Rebirth	Jan 17, 2017	978-1401268251
Omnibus
	The Superspy Omnibus	Grayson #1-20, Grayson: Futures End #1, Grayson Annual #1-3, Robin War #1-2, Nightwing: Rebirth, material from Secret Origins (vol. 3) #8	Oct 24, 2017	978-1401274160
	The Superspy Omnibus	Grayson #1-20, Grayson: Futures End #1, Grayson Annual #1-3, Robin War #1-2, Nightwing: Rebirth, material from Secret Origins (vol. 3) #8	Aug 27, 2019	978-1401295059
	The Superspy Omnibus	Grayson #1-20, Grayson: Futures End #1, Grayson Annual #1-3, Robin War #1-2, Nightwing: Rebirth, material from Secret Origins (vol. 3) #8	Nov 15, 2022	978-1779517326

== See also ==
- List of DC Comics publications
- List of Batman comics
