= Cassie Hack =

- Cover of Hack/Slash #23. Art by Chris Dien.

Publication information
- Publisher: Devil's Due Publishing
- First appearance: Hack/Slash: Euthanized (April 2004)
- Created by: Tim Seeley

In-story information
- Partnerships: Vlad; Hack/Slash Inc.

Cassandra "Cassie" Hack is a fictional character that appears as the main protagonist in the Hack/Slash comic books published by Devil's Due Publishing. The character first appears in Hack/Slash: Euthanized (April 2004), and was created by writer and occasional penciller Tim Seeley.

Seeley has repeatedly stated that Cassie is designed to be a horror victim who has overcome her fears and decided to take revenge on horror villains, who are known in the comic as "slashers". However, despite her hardened exterior, Seeley has tried to show that "beneath [the surface Cassie] is still [a] lost, scared innocent girl".

In 2005, Stefani Bishop portrayed Cassie in a stage adaptation of Hack/Slash called Hack/Slash: Stagefright. A film adaptation of Hack/Slash was in development by Rogue Pictures.

== Publication history ==
Cassie and her partner, Vlad, first appeared in the Hack/Slash one-shot (later renamed Hack/Slash: Euthanized) in 2004. This included a brief backstory called The Strange Story of Cassie Hack. Between 2005 and 2007 a series of further one-shots were released including a mini-series: Hack/Slash: Land of Lost Toys. In 2007, Hack/Slash became an ongoing series.

Hack/Slash has included crossovers with other franchises with Cassie and Vlad encountering Evil Ernie, Chucky, a horde of treehuggers and Herbert West from the cult-classic Re-Animator film series.

== Fictional character biography ==
=== Early life ===
Cassandra "Cassie" Hack, daughter of Dr. Jack and Delilah Hack, grew up in western Wisconsin. Her father left soon after she was born, leaving Cassie with her overbearing, eccentric mother who worked as a cook at a nearby high school. A timid wallflower, plain-looking and unattractive, young Cassie was verbally and physically abused by her classmates. Never having a friend, Cassie was ostracized because she wasn't pretty and was poor and ill-dressed. This prompted her unbalanced mother, the "Lunch Lady", to kill every child at Cassie's school that had somehow hurt or insulted Cassie and serve them as the school food. Cassie, witnessing her mother's last killing spree, promptly called the police. She managed to save the life of her mother's last victim, but was forced to witness her mother's death when she committed suicide.

Cassie was placed in a foster home and attended a new school. She detested her fanatically religious foster parents, but endured, desiring to be accepted by someone. She began training in various martial arts and fighting techniques. In the meantime, she tried to find her father, utilizing the internet and whatever resources she could find. Two years later, children began disappearing once more, signalling the return of her mother, reborn as a vengeful "slasher" trying to continue its murderous spree. Feeling responsible for the deaths, Cassie confronted her mother once again and shot her. Driven by guilt and lacking any connection to anyone or anyplace, Cassie left her foster family and went on the road.

=== Solo adventures ===
Cassie became determined to seek out slashers and stop their rampages wherever she could. She also hoped that she might find a clue to the whereabouts of her father, but for a long time, found nothing.

On one of her adventures, Cassie came to Chicago, where she hunted a killer known as "the Meatman", who was responsible for the deaths of several teenagers. She eventually encountered the Meatman, but discovered that he was not responsible for the murders. Cassie befriended the Meatman, a misshapen man named Vlad, and together they hunted down the actual murderer, a local minister/assassin with Mafia connections. The two began travelling together in a van bought with Cassie's inheritance, with Vlad acting as her bodyguard and muscle.

=== Cassie and Vlad, slasher slayers ===
Some time later, the pair investigate a series of murders around a veterinary clinic in Eminence, Indiana. They rescue a vet, Lisa, from a slasher who was accidentally killed by Lisa's boyfriend. Later, they investigate a murder at a beach resort hosting a "girls gone naughty" event. While investigating the situation, Cassie becomes extremely drunk (when a boy drugged her ice tea with pure vodka) and having lost her inhibitions, flirts with a stranger and kisses a random girl. Despite being less than sober, she continues her investigation and encounters a crazed Catholic schoolgirl, Laura Lochs, who controls an undead preacher named Father Wrath. After a prolonged fight, Vlad kills Father Wrath and Cassie sets Laura on fire and leaves her for dead. Soon after, Cassie and Vlad, encounter a pair of slashers murdering writers and illustrators at a Philadelphia comic convention.

When Evil Ernie awakens in the Hack/Slash universe he begins a killing spree, murdering six women near a strip club in New Jersey. Cassie and Vlad investigate and track Ernie to a saw mill where he falls in love with Cassie, believing the two of them to be "two sides of the same coin". After escaping from Ernie, Cassie is distressed by the fact that she now has to kill the "one person who loves her". Vlad asserts that he loves her, but Cassie snaps and claims that he only thinks that because she's the only one who can stand being around him. Shocked by what she's said, she apologizes to Vlad and the pair resume their hunt for Ernie. Upon finding Ernie, he attempts to kidnap Cassie but accidentally banishes himself to Hell.

A tip from Lisa, who has been staying in contact, leads Cassie and Vlad to investigating the circumstances behind nine children dying in their sleep. Their contact, Jason, concludes that the person responsible is Ashley, a Freddy Krueger-esque slasher who can kill people in their dreams. After Jason is also killed, Cassie gets Lisa to knock her out with sleeping gas, so she can confront Ashley in his realm. Despite Ashley's best efforts, he is unable to kill Cassie and she soon turns her own past on him and Ashley is dispatched by Cassie's own worst nightmare: her mother. Afterward, Jason's ex-flatmate, Chris, begins a relationship with Lisa.

Later, while setting a trap for a slasher calling herself "the Acid Angel", Cassie and Vlad discover that a company led by ex-Miss America Emily Cristy is capturing slashers in order to perform experiments upon them. Cassie discovers that the company is producing a regenerative drug that turns people into slashers. After the slashers escape, Emily ends up taking the drug to save her life, but has her skin burned off in an explosion, creating a new slasher: Ms. America. Soon afterward, Cassie teams-up with a possessed doll, Chucky, in order to confront Laura Lochs who has returned and stolen Vlad's body using a voodoo amulet. After a series of battles, they defeat Laura once again and Vlad regains control of his body. However, despite Cassie's trying to stop him, Chucky escapes.

Cassie is later captured by a slasher who used to be a psychologist who analyzes and tortures her. After losing two toes and remembering various events from her childhood, Cassie self-diagnoses herself as "really fucked up" and pushes him out of the window. However, later in the bathroom, Cassie's hard exterior falters and she cries. Several days later, after receiving a call from Chris, Cassie and Vlad travel to Tampa Bay to investigate a string of disappearances coinciding with the tour schedule of a band called Acid Washed. Upon getting there, they meet a stripper called Georgia who offers to take them to the next concert. At the show, the band transport all the virgin girls, including Cassie and Georgia, to another realm to be sacrificed. While caged, Cassie talks to a local dog named Pooch, who tells her that the singer, Six Sixx, has made a deal with a demon. Afterwards, Cassie and Georgia flirt and talk about Cassie's undecided sexuality and the possibilities of escaping by "making each other impure" by having sex. However, Vlad arrives to rescue them and together they return to Earth and defeat Six.

Some time later, Cassie is forced to sell her mother's wedding ring in order to pay for better accommodation while Vlad recovers from a respiratory infection. Afterward, they travel to Stone County and encounter a new Father Wrath, who turns out to be nephew of the original.

=== Search for Dr. Jack Hack ===
Cassie and Vlad's next adventure leads to a college in Massachusetts where a series of corpses have been discovered. Cassie and Vlad's relationship is somewhat rocky due to the amount of time Cassie has been spending on the phone with Georgia. After Vlad is attacked, Cassie begins questioning the local students and discovers that a number of them are lesbians who are involved in a cult surrounding the mythology of Elizabeth Bathory. After accidentally kissing one of the students (and thinking of Georgia at the time), Cassie interrogates her to find out more information about the cult. However, before the student can lead her to the cult's base of operations, Cassie encounters a government team working for her father. Cassie, Vlad and the government team are led to the cult's underground base where they are attacked by Ms. America, who has been stealing the blood and skin of students in an attempt to regain her original beauty. After a long battle, Vlad impales Ms. America. Afterwards, Cassie and Vlad reconcile, though Cassie is uncertain of her feelings towards Georgia.

Following the clues given by the government team, Cassie and Vlad search a cabin in Montana in the hopes of finding information about Cassie's father. What they find is a series of journals detailing how a group of feral children were turned into "revenants" (i.e., slashers) using a drug. The children then attack and Cassie is forced to shoot them, much to Vlad's objections. Afterwards, Cassie and Vlad hunt down a one-eyed vigilante, Nathan, who Cassie believes is a slasher. However, he is actually a man seeking vengeance for the murder of his wife. After Nathan exacts his revenge (he's fatally wounded in the process) Cassie, still confused by her feelings for Georgia, asks him how he knew that he was in love. Afterwards, Cassie takes a break from searching for her father to investigate a series of killings in Hitchfield, Georgia and encounter a horde of treehuggers and their puppet master, Eddie.

Not long after, Georgia contacts Cassie when several of the cast of a Wizard of Oz remake turn up dead. However, despite being told to wait, Georgia investigates on her own and is almost killed by a psychopathic Tin Man. She is soon rescued by an angry Cassie who begs Georgia "not to die on [her, because] there's too much death in [her] life already". Cassie's search for her father soon comes to an end when she encounters Dr Herbert West, who has been working with Dr Jack Hack in researching slashers. West succeeds in reviving Delilah Hack; however she reverts to her Lunch Lady persona and kills her husband. Disappointed with the results, West kills the Lunch Lady with an overdose of his serum. He then gives Cassie the opportunity to reanimate her father, but she refuses.

Losing both her parents once again leaves Cassie deeply depressed, prompting the worried Vlad into calling Georgia and asking her to talk to Cassie. Cassie confides in Georgia that she can't go on killing slashers and wants to live a normal life, thoughts which alienate Vlad. While going to the Mississippi police to tell them all she knows about slashers, Cassie is arrested due to her suspected involvement in homicides throughout the country, the authorities having been led to believe Cassie may be responsible for the murders due to tips from psychic Muffy Joworski (who is being manipulated by the returned Ashley Guthrie, which Cassie and Vlad piece together). While being transported to a detention center Cassie is broken out by the Society of the Black Lamp, who attempt to ritualistically murder her as punishment for destroying slashers. At the last minute Cassie is saved by the vigilante Samhain, who kills the Black Lamp members.

== Skills and abilities ==
While Cassie has no formal combat training beyond childhood martial arts lessons, Cassie is a skilled close quarters fighter. Her weapon of choice is usually something light and swingable, such as her trademarked baseball bat. She is also adept at using a handgun and has killed many slashers with one. Cassie also has an eye for improvised weaponry and has been known to use all kinds of inanimate objects as makeshift weapons.

== Reception ==
Cassie Hack was ranked 37th in Comics Buyer's Guide's "100 Sexiest Women in Comics" list.

== In other media ==
Stefani Bishop as Cassie Hack in Hack/Slash: Stagefright.

=== Film ===
- In 2006, Rogue Pictures secured the rights to produce a Hack/Slash film.

=== Stage ===
- In the 2005 stage play, Hack/Slash: Stagefright, Cassie was portrayed by Stefani Bishop. The production, by the New Millennium Theatre Company, was an adaptation of Hack/Slash: Euthanized and Hack/Slash: Girls Gone Dead.
