= Local Man (comics) =

Comics series Local Man

Publication information
- Publisher: Image Comics
- Schedule: Monthly
- Format: Ongoing series
- Genre: Crime noir, Superhero
- Publication date: February 2023
- No. of issues: 14 (and 2 specials)

Creative team
- Written by: Tony Fleecs
- Artist: Tim Seeley
- Colorist(s): Brad Simpson, Felipe Sobreiro, Brian Reber

Collected editions
- Heartland: ISBN 978-1534399587
- The Dry Season: ISBN 978-1534397361
- Lost Ones: ISBN 978-1534373204

Local Man is a comic book series written and drawn by Tony Fleecs and Tim Seeley for Image Comics, set in the Image Universe. Each issue has a lead story written by Fleecs and Seeley with art by Fleecs and a flashback story, drawn by Seeley. The colorists are Brad Simpson, Felipe Sobreiro, and Brian Reber.

It launched in February 2023. Fleecs described the book as: "a guy that used to be a 1990s Image Comic superhero. Now it's today, and he's sort of canceled and fired from his job as a superhero. He has to move home with his folks in the Midwest, and everybody in town hates him."

On the release schedule, he added: "Every arc we do a story and then we'll do a one-shot in between to sort of bring in new readers, give you something, because the book is really '90s focused."

The series ended with issue #25 in November 2024.

== Reception ==
Reviews for the series have been largely positive. Games Radar placed the series at number 25 for its best comics of 2023, noting it was: "A treat for anyone who read '90s superhero comics, especially the first generation of Image titles". The Hollywood Reporter included the series in its 2023 round-up of best new series, writing: "It's a book that should be a joke – and believe us, it's got plenty of those – but it somehow manages to be a well-thought out superhero noir that moves beyond simple nostalgia." It was also an honorable mention in IGN's list, plus came in at number 74 of Comic Book Resources' best comics for 2023.

== Issues ==
Issue	Released	Plot
#1	22 Feb 2023	Once, Jack Xaver, star recruit of the media sensation super-team Third Gen, had it all. But when controversy sends Crossjack crawling back to his mom and dad's basement in the Midwest, Jack struggles to fit into a world he left far behind. And then the bodies start piling up.
#2	29 Mar 2023	Once, Jack Xaver, star recruit of the media sensation super-team Third Gen, had it all. But when controversy sends Crossjack crawling back to his mom and dad's basement in the Midwest, Jack struggles to fit into a world he left far behind. And then the bodies start piling up.
#3	26 Apr 2023	Once, Jack Xaver, star recruit of the media sensation super-team Third Gen, had it all. But when controversy sends Crossjack crawling back to his mom and dad's basement in the Midwest, Jack struggles to fit into a world he left far behind. And then the bodies start piling up.
#4	31 May 2023	Once, Jack Xaver, star recruit of the media sensation super-team Third Gen, had it all. But when controversy sends Crossjack crawling back to his mom and dad's basement in the Midwest, Jack struggles to fit into a world he left far behind. And then the bodies start piling up.
#5	28 Jun 2023	Once, Jack Xaver, star recruit of the media sensation super-team Third Gen, had it all. But when controversy sends Crossjack crawling back to his mom and dad's basement in the Midwest, Jack struggles to fit into a world he left far behind. And then the bodies start piling up.
Gold	30 Aug 2023	Jack comes face to face with his explosive past when his superhero alter ego is blasted into modern-day Farmington by a massive cosmic event.
#6	18 Oct 2023	Jack Xaver, Farmington's very own Local Man, is called in to investigate a mysterious drowning on dry land. The problem is, Jack isn't legally allowed to be a superhero. Oh, also, he's sleeping with the police chief's wife.
#7	29 Nov 2023	Jack Xaver, Farmington's very own Local Man, is called in to investigate a mysterious drowning on dry land. The problem is, Jack isn't legally allowed to be a superhero. Oh, also, he's sleeping with the police chief's wife.
#8	27 Dec 2023	Jack Xaver, Farmington's very own Local Man, is called in to investigate a mysterious drowning on dry land. The problem is, Jack isn't legally allowed to be a superhero. Oh, also, he's sleeping with the police chief's wife.
#9	31 Jan 2024	Jack Xaver, Farmington's very own Local Man, is called in to investigate a mysterious drowning on dry land. The problem is, Jack isn't legally allowed to be a superhero. Oh, also, he's sleeping with the police chief's wife.
Bad Girls	27 Mar 2024	Local Man's former girlfriend is now on the run, where she runs into superhero, Neon.
#10	22 May 2024	Jack Xavier needs to hide out alongside an ally from his past.
#11	3 Jul 2024	Jack Xavier needs to hide out alongside an ally from his past.
#12	24 Jul 2024	Jack Xavier needs to hide out alongside an ally from his past.
#13	23 Aug 2024	Jack Xavier needs to hide out alongside an ally from his past.
#25	16 Oct 2024	Local Man jumps ahead a year, offering a glimpse of the future.

== Collected Editions ==
Vol	Title	Material collected	Format	Pages	Released	ISBN
1	Heartland	Local Man #1–5	TPB	172	4 Oct 2023	978-1534399587
2	The Dry Season	Local Man #6–9, Local Man Gold	TPB	168	2 Apr 2024	978-1534397361
3	Lost Ones	Local Man #10-13, #25, Local Man: Bad Girls	TPB	176	26 Nov 2024	978-1534373204
	Deluxe Edition	Local Man #1-13, 25, Local Man: Gold, Local Man: Bad Girls	OHC	600	8 Jul 2025	978-1534328259
