= Mike Norton =

American comic book artist and writer

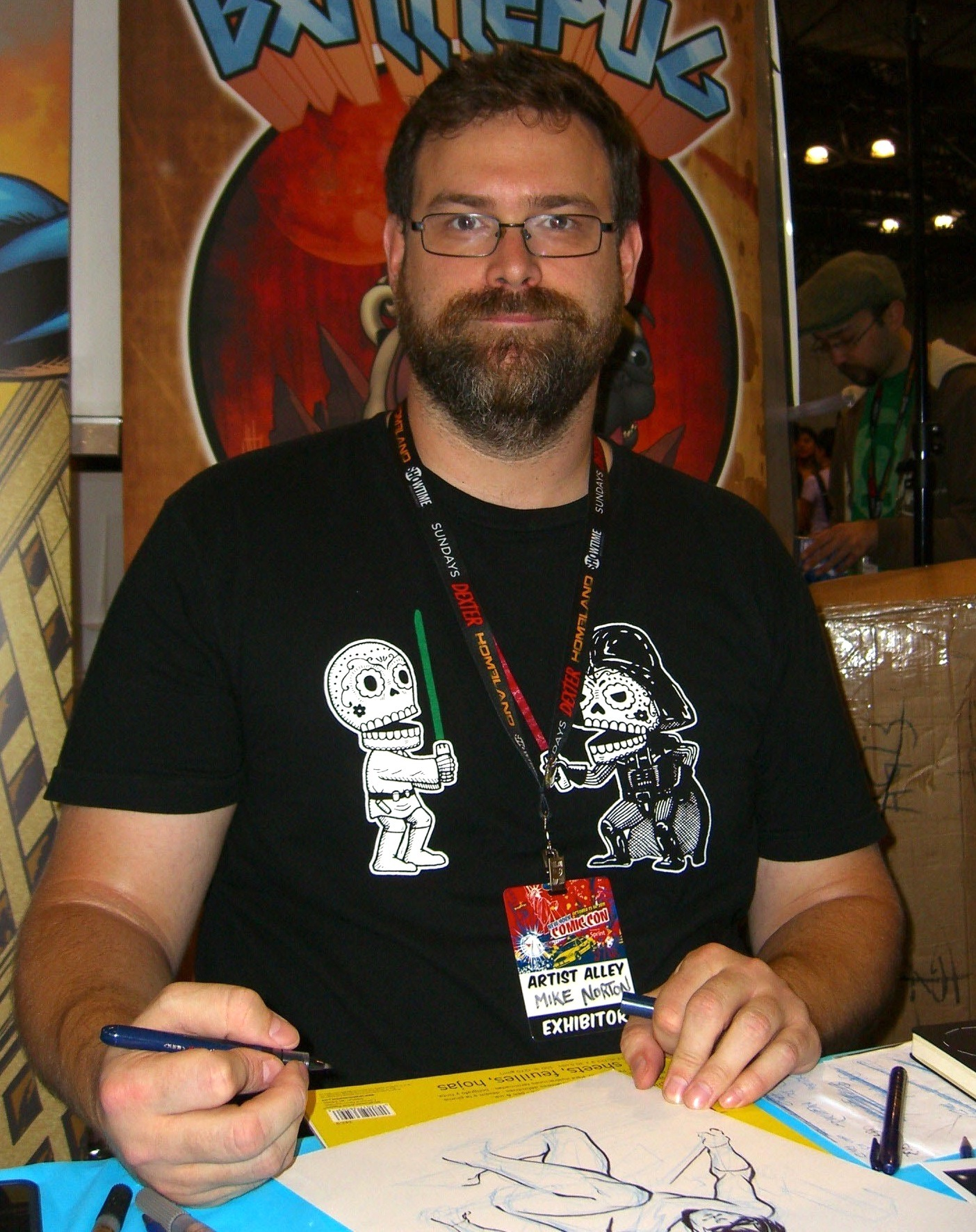
- Norton at the 2011 New York Comic Con
- Areas: Writer, Penciller
- Notable works: Battlepug; Gravity; Runaways; Revival

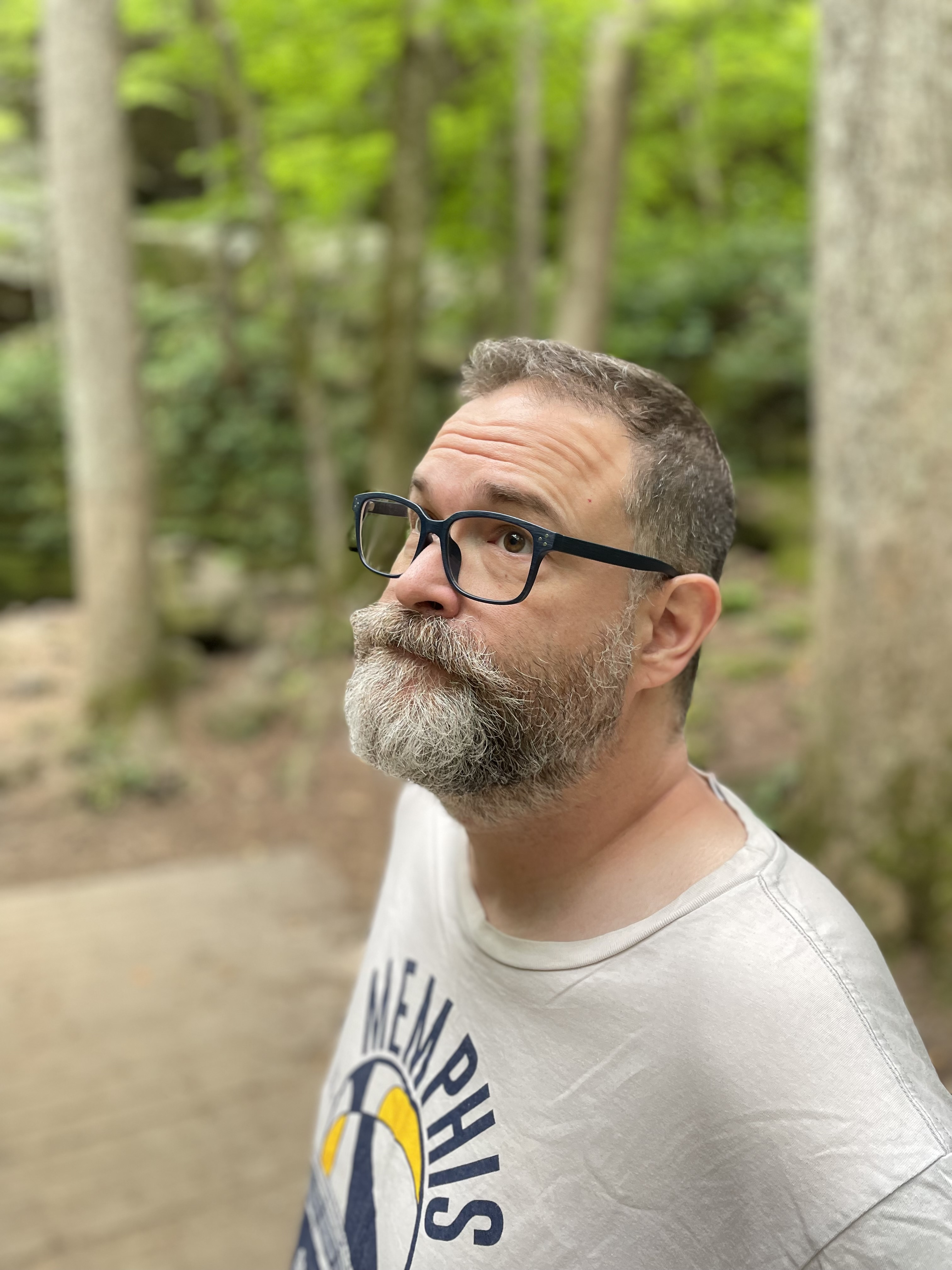
Mike Norton

Mike Norton is an American comic book artist and writer, known for his work on Battlepug.

== Early life ==
Mike Norton first discovered comics as a child when his father gave him a copy of The Amazing Spider-Man #163, before he was old enough to read. Norton names that comic and Star Wars as his greatest childhood influences. His biggest childhood artistic influence were John Romita Sr., John Byrne, and John Buscema. During the 1980s and 1990s, he was also influenced by independent comics creators such as Bill Reinhold, Matt Wagner, Howard Chaykin, Mike Wieringo, and Mike Allred. While in high school, Norton played in a band and considered careers in music and veterinary medicine before deciding on a career in comics.

== Career ==
In 2001, Norton became Art Director for Devil's Due Publishing, and drew the publisher's first Voltron miniseries.

In 2005 Norton became a freelancer and worked on books such as Queen & Country, Gravity, Runaways The All-New Atom and Green Arrow/Black Canary.

In February 2007, Norton signed an exclusive contract with DC and has worked on The All-New Atom, written by Gail Simone. He took over pencil duties on Green Arrow/Black Canary from issue 7, worked on several issues of Countdown to Final Crisis, illustrated a fill-in issue of Blue Beetle and contributed to the backup stories in DC's weekly series, Trinity.

In July 2010, Norton was announced as the artist for the comic book adaptation of the Young Justice animated series.

In February 2011, Norton launched his web comic, Battlepug. A dark-humored, sword and sorcery revenge story, Battlepug is about the surviving member of the Kinmundian Tribe known simply as "The Warrior", his steed, the Battlepug, and their traveling companion, Scrabbly. The story is narrated by Moll, who recounts the tale to her talking dogs, a Pug named Mingo and a French Bulldog named Colfax. The first year of strips was collected into a hardcover by Dark Horse Comics and released July 4, 2012.

Also in 2011, Norton was a founding member of Four Star Studios in Chicago, Illinois where he shares workspace with Tim Seeley, Jenny Frison, Chris Burnham, and other comic professionals.

In mid-2012, Mike Norton won the Best Digital Comic Eisner award for Battlepug. In July 2012, he partnered with Seeley on a creator-owned series called Revival. The series debuted to strong sales and critical acclaim.

Along with Battlepug and Revival, Mike Norton is providing penciling duties to It-Girl and the Atomics and providing art assists to Jaime McKelvie on Marvel's The Defenders.

== Personal life ==
Norton is a fan of Rudy Ray Moore movies and hip hop music, including Doomtree and Adam Warrock. He names Ireland as his favorite place to travel.
