= Battlepug =

Webcomic

- Author(s): Mike Norton
- Website: www.battlepug.com
- Current status/schedule: Weekly: Monday
- Launch date: February 14, 2011
- End date: June 17, 2016
- Publisher(s): Dark Horse Comics (print)
- Genre(s): Action, comedy, Fantasy

Battlepug is a webcomic written and illustrated by Mike Norton, colored by Allen Passalaqua, and lettered by Chris Crank.

== History ==
Norton created the characters for Battlepug in a rush to create a T-shirt for iFanboy.com. In February 2011, Norton launched his webcomic, Battlepug. A dark-humored, fantasy-genred revenge story, Battlepug is about the last surviving member of the Kinmundian Tribe known only as "The Warrior", his steed, the Battlepug, and their traveling companion, Scrabbly. The story is narrated by Moll, who recounts the tale to her talking dogs, a Pug named Mingo and a French Bulldog named Colfax. The first year of strips was collected into a hardcover by Dark Horse Comics and released July 4, 2012. In mid-2012, Mike Norton won the Best Digital Comic Eisner award for Battlepug.

Every Friday, Norton released pictures of Battlepug readers and their pugs in "Friday Battlepuggage".

== Characters ==
=== The Warrior ===
The protagonist of the story goes by simply The Warrior. As a boy, he was the sole survivor of an attack by a giant baby seal orchestrated by a mysterious man riding a tiger called Catwulf on the people of Kinmundy, it claimed the lives of The Warrior's mother and father. He was then captured by a parody of Santa Claus and Christmas elves and forced to fight and fuel the fires of the toy workshop. Eventually, he was allowed to get revenge on the seal and the factory and set about on his quest for revenge on the mysterious man. The Warrior is clearly influenced by works like Conan the Barbarian and other fantasy barbarians.

=== The Battlepug ===
The Warrior's trusty, but dimwitted and slobbery steed is a giant pug. At first, The Warrior is very reluctant to be partnered with the Battlepug. However, it is clear the Battlepug has a strong connection to The Warrior and views him as his master.

=== Scrabbly ===
Scrabbly meets The Warrior in the abandoned swamp village of Patoka. He is a somewhat crazy old hermit and often goes on rambling speeches using the words "scribbly" and "scrabbly".

=== Moll ===
Battlepug is a bedside story being told by the attractive Moll to her two talking dogs, Mingo the Pug and Colfax the French Bulldog, while she passes time waiting in a lavish room, supposedly with no doors, in a tower high above a grand city. She is shown to be nude with tattoos on her arms.

== Story arcs ==
Battlepug is a revenge story that is dotted with absurd and often comical monster battles as The Warrior travels across a mystical world in search of vengeance.

The first volume of Battlepug is called "Blood and Drool".

== In print ==
The first year of Battlepug comics were collected into a hardcover book published by Dark Horse Comics on July 4, 2012.

== Reception ==
Battlepug earned an Eisner Award for Best Digital Comic in 2012. It also won the Harvey Award for Best Online Comics Work in 2013, 2014, and 2016.
