= Jenny Frison =

American comic book cover artist

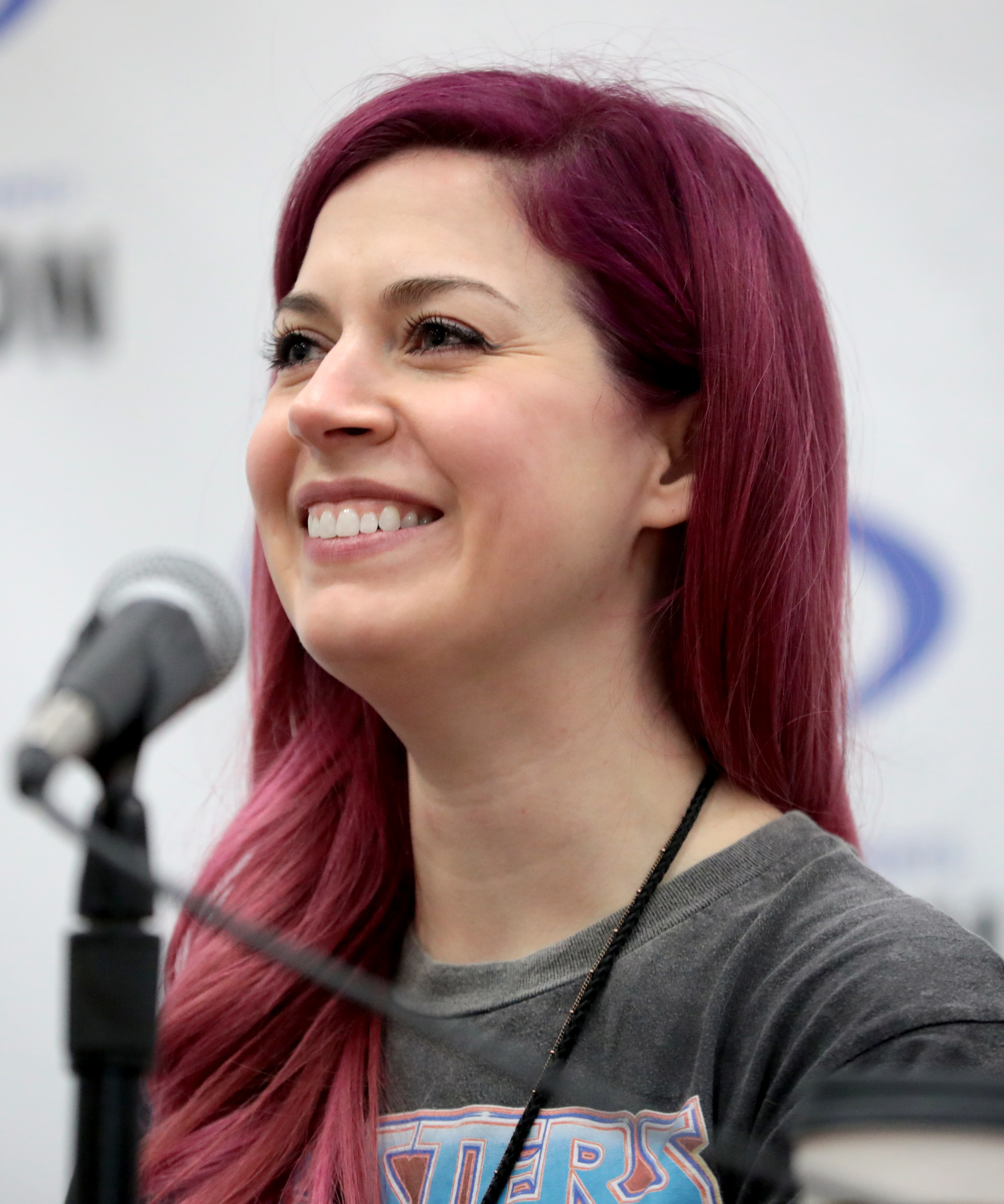
Frison at WonderCon 2023

Jenny Frison is an American comic book cover artist. Her interest in comics began with a Wonder Woman storybook she enjoyed as a young girl. She majored in illustration at Northern Illinois University before attending The Kubert School of Art. During school, she decided she wanted to focus on cover art and quit before her third year to teach herself. She met writer Tim Seeley, who asked her to draw a cover for Hack/Slash after he looked at her website. The two became friends, and they now share a work space at Four Star Studios in Chicago, Illinois.

Her artistic process starts with a pencil sketch followed by a tonal drawing on gray paper. She colors the image in Photoshop. She was nominated for "Best Cover Artist" in the 2013 and 2015 Harvey Awards.

Between 2015 and 2017, Frison drew the main covers for Clean Room, a series written by Gail Simone and published by Vertigo Comics. During the DC Rebirth era, she drew variant covers for nearly all Wonder Woman issues from #9 (October 2016) through #61 (January 2019) as well as covers for tie-in/crossover issues.

The city of Burbank, California in March 2023 unveiled a statue of Wonder Woman that was based on a design by Jenny Frison. The statue was created by various artists from Burbank’s American Fine Arts Foundry and Fabrication.

Frison created the poster for the American TV series Agents of S.H.I.E.L.D. episode "Melinda".
