= Hack/Slash =

Comic book series

- Cover art for Hack/Slash #1. Art by Tim Seeley.

Publication information
- Publisher: Devil's Due Publishing; Image Comics; Dynamite Entertainment
- Publication date: 2004–2015 (original) 2017–2018 (Resurrection)
- No. of issues: Vol. 1 32; Vol. 2 25; Vol. 3 5; Vol. 4 12

Creative team
- Created by: Tim Seeley (writer); Stefano Caselli (artist)

Collected editions
- Omnibus Vol. 1: ISBN 1-934692-08-5
- Omnibus Vol. 2: ISBN 1-934692-57-3
- Omnibus Vol. 3: ISBN 1-60706-275-5
- Omnibus Vol. 4: ISBN 1-60706-526-6
- Omnibus Vol. 5: ISBN 1-60706-741-2
- Omnibus Vol. 6: ISBN 1-5343-1219-6
- Back to School: ISBN 1-5343-9778-7

Hack/Slash is a comic book series, launched from several one shots of the same name, published by Image Comics (previously by Devil's Due Publishing). The series was created by writer and sometime penciller Tim Seeley. The series follows horror victim Cassie Hack as she strikes back at the monsters who prey upon teenagers. These monsters are known as "slashers", and are a mix of original villains and crossover appearances, such as the appearance of Re-Animator (from Herbert West–Reanimator) in Volume 1.

== Publication history ==
=== Devil's Due and Volume 1 ===
Hack/Slash began in 2004 as a series of one-shots, starting with the Stefano Caselli-penciled Hack/Slash (later referred to by its story title Euthanized), followed by the Federica Manfredi-penciled Girls Gone Dead.

2005 saw the one-shot Comic Book Carnage and the series stars, Vlad and Cassie, appeared in the Aadi Salman-pencilled The Final Revenge of Evil Ernie. The "Hack/Slash" one-shots were collected as the First Cut trade paperback in the same year. The first "Hack/Slash" miniseries, Land of Lost Toys, debuted, penciled by Dave Crosland, followed by a collection of new short stories in a 2006 special issue called Trailers (featuring art by writer Stefano Caselli and Tim Seeley, Mike Norton, Skottie Young and Josh Medors).

A 25-cent preview issue giving newcomers a recap of "Euthanized" hit the markets in 2006, along with "Slice Hard", the first one-shot of 2006. Seeley penciled the new part of the preview and was one of the pencilers and inkers of the one-shot along with Mark Englert, Nate Bellgarde, Andy Kuhn and Joe Largent.

In March 2007, Devil's Due released a Free Comic Book Day comic showcasing their Family Guy and Hack/Slash titles, theHack/Slash section of which contained a recap portion of the 25-cent preview issue. Also released in March 2007 was Hack/Slash vs. Chucky, which saw the lead duo taking on the evil doll and which was penciled by Matt Merhoff.

Hack/Slash graduated to an ongoing series in May 2007, which included a Hack/Slash Annual collecting the webcomic featuring the SuicideGirls photo shoot.

In March 2010 it was announced at the Emerald City Comicon that creator Tim Seeley was taking Hack/Slash from Devil's Due Publications to Image Comics. The move came after news that Devil's Due was going through financial difficulties, with staff on all levels not being paid for several months. Tim Seeley allegedly did not receive his paycheck and thus was not able to pay his staff of artists and colourists. Hack/Slash's tenure at Devil's Due closed with issue #32, the final issue of Volume 1.

From September 2011, Hack/Slash was available digitally through Devil's Due Digital.

=== Image Comics and Volume 2 ===
Hack/Slash's first release through Image was the 4-part miniseries My First Maniac, which started in June 2010. It was followed by a second ongoing Hack/Slash series, which concluded in March 2013 with issue 25. Image Comics later published the complete Hack/Slash, including crossovers and the early Devil's Due issues, in five numbered 'omnibus editions'.

=== Volume 3: Son of Samhain ===
Beginning in July 2014, the first issue of a further five-issue miniseries, Son of Samhain, was released through Image. Tim Seeley did not work on the series, which was instead written by Michael Moreci and Steve Seeley, with art by Emilio Laiso. In this volume Cassie became a bounty hunter and gained a new partner called Delroy.

=== Volume 4: Resurrection ===
In 2017, Tim revived the series under a new title with a new creative staff called Hack/Slash: Resurrection with Tini Howard writing the series and Celor and K. Michael Russell on art duty. The series brought back fan favorite Vlad, as well as crossing over with Vampirella. The series details a new road trip for Cassie and Vlad, with Cassie sick of leaving nothing but destruction in her wake and Vlad excited to have a new chance at life.

=== Hack/Slash: Back to School ===
On July 18, 2023, Image Comics announced a new Hack/Slash miniseries called Back to School by the writer/artist of It's Lonely at the Center of the Earth, Zoe Thorogood, with Tim Seeley serving as the editor.

== Characters ==
=== Major characters ===
- Cassandra "Cassie" Hack – A young woman who had to gun down her own mother who, after committing suicide rather than face justice for murdering a group of young boys who were bullying her daughter, returned to life as a slasher called "The Lunch Lady". Cassie now drifts around the United States in an old van, hunting slashers with her partner, Vlad.
- Vlad – The enigmatic partner of Cassie, Vlad is a big, muscular and disfigured man, who wears a gas mask and brandishes two big meat cleavers. Met by Cassie when they were both stalking the "Meatman Killer", Cassie soon befriended him. There's not much known about Vlad, not even his full name, but he seems very aware of his unconventional looks, which prompts him to wear the gas mask (which, he says, protects him from the thin outside air he has been deprived of for 20 years – though he can be seen breathing without his mask too). According to Vlad, he was raised by a butcher who rescued him from a garbage can. The butcher served as his only human contact. He used comic books to teach Vlad to read; he also taught Vlad how to use knives to help him adjust to his deformities. When the butcher died, Vlad was forced to go outside where rumors of the Meatman started and he eventually met Cassie. Vlad's relationship with Cassie is quite paternal, as Vlad seems utterly concerned with his "little one's" well-being. Quite naive, but well-versed in strategy and battle skills, Vlad doubles as the "muscle" of the team, and as a sort of guardian for Cassie, counseling and comforting her when it's needed.

=== Supporting characters ===
- Chris Krank and Doctor Lisa Elsten – Lisa was introduced in Hack/Slash: Euthanized as the girlfriend of Kyle Bell. Chris appeared later in Hack/Slash: Land of Lost Toys #1 as the geeky roommate of Jason Michaels. Both survived the Slasher attacks in their respective stories and because of this reappeared in Hack/Slash vs. Chucky as two of the potential victims of Laura Lochs. They are now in a relationship and living together. Together they have formed Hack/Slash Inc, a website for Slasher survivors.
- Margaret Crump aka Georgia Peaches – Georgia is a recurring character in Hack/Slash, who is currently a potential love interest for Cassie. Introduced in Hack/Slash #2 as a stripper who was a fan of the band, Acid Washed. Was sent to the hell dimension of Nef by the band along with Cassie as virgin sacrifices. During their time caged up together, Cassie and Georgia discussed Cassie's lack of a sex life and her orientation, which she is still unsure of. This led to Georgia suggesting that were they not chained up, they could have sex with each other in order to become "impure" and therefore escape. Since escaping from Nef, Cassie and Georgia have been keeping in touch by phoning each other every day. In Hack/Slash #8, Cassie fantasizes about kissing Georgia, suggesting that Georgia's previous suggestion about Cassie being bi may actually be correct. However, after several bad experiences with Slashers Cassie breaks away from her to keep her safe. The two would later try to reconnect as lovers, but Georgia this time would move away.
- Pooch – Pooch first appears in the "Shout at the Devil" arc as a spawn and servant of the Neflords, H. P. Lovecraft-esque entities which reproduce by impregnating virgins from Earth, whom they have abducted to their dimension of Nef. Resembling a demonic hairless dog, Pooch works under the Neflords' lieutenant Elvis Presley and, after his master is killed and Cassie and Georgia escape Nef, is sent to Earth to kill Cassie, but instead meets and befriends Chris and Lisa, who (reluctantly at first) let Pooch live with them. Pooch decides to abandon the Neflords and have Chris and Lisa as his new masters due to their kindness to him. In the arc "Closer", Pooch is severely injured while defending Chris and Lisa from another agent of the Neflords sent to kill him and Cassie, an agent which is later killed by Chris; Pooch's display of loyalty and bravery ultimately cause Chris and Lisa to realize how much he means to them, and the two have begun helping him to recuperate.
- Cat Curio – Catherine "Cat" Curio was an intrepid young detective who was stabbed by a Slasher known as Samhain at the age of ten. The attack nearly killed her, putting her into a coma for thirteen years. When she awoke again, she was still full of childlike enthusiasm and a passion for crime-solving. This eventually led to her crossing paths with Cassie Hack and Vlad. Though Cat is incredibly quirky and often gets on Cassie's nerves, she proves herself time and time again to be a valuable asset to the team. She eventually teams up with Pooch to form Cat and Dog Investigations.
- Samhain – Samhain saved Cassie Hack from the Black Lamp Society murder attempt. He has no memory of his past life, except for his exceptional fighting skills and his hatred for the Society. He's trying to rescue Ava Park from the Black Lamp Society with the aid of Cassie and Vlad. Making his debut in issue #20, Samhain is a jack-o-lantern-masked ex-Slasher. His conscience has been restored, as well as his lack of desire to commit meaningless murder like other Slashers. In later issues, Samhain's face is revealed from behind the mask, and following his capture and re-programming by the Black Lamp Society in issues 24–25, he then once again becomes, albeit briefly, the deadliest Slasher of all; he is then ordered to kill his love, Dr. Ava Park, and obeys. This spell is only broken by a passionate kiss from Cassie which restores his mind to its former pre-Slasher default setting. But for Cassie, this also awakens something in her she didn't think possible, and in later issues is found deeply fantasizing about and desiring the masked man. Akakios is his true identity and is the main antagonist of the series.

=== Slashers ===
Slashers (known to the government as "Revenants") are the beings that Cassie and Vlad hunt down. Slashers as a whole can be divided into two broad categories. The first and most common are the undead variety: These are people who died while filled with rage toward life, and somehow return from the dead filled with only that rage driving them to kill. While their exact abilities vary individually, all possess resistance to damage, and must suffer severe bodily harm to be killed. This kind can be controlled by the proper magics, and once their body has been sufficiently destroyed, usually stay dead. The other kind are people who are still alive, but are often insane and engage in Slasher behavior. They can be killed by normal means.

=== Army of Darkness crossover ===
A six-part crossover began in July 2013, released by Dynamite Entertainment. Featuring Ash Williams of the Evil Dead series it takes place a few months after the end of volume 2 of Hack/Slash, though it is unclear whether or not it is canon to Hack/Slash. The ongoing Evil Dead comic has referenced it multiple times since release.

== Collections ==
Hack/Slash has been collected in the following trade paperbacks:

Title	Material collected	ISBN	Date Released
Volume 1: First Cut	Hack/Slash: Euthanized; Hack/Slash: Girls Gone Dead; Hack/Slash: Comic Book Carnage 'Slashing Through the Snow'	1-932796-42-8; 1-932796-87-8	October 12, 2005; January 31, 2007
Volume 2: Death By Sequel	Hack/Slash: The Land of Lost Toys #1–3; Hack/Slash: Trailers; Hack/Slash: Slice Hard Prequel; Hack/Slash: Slice Hard	1-932796-75-4	April 11, 2007
Volume 3: Friday the 31st	Hack/Slash Vs. Chucky; Hack/Slash #1–4	1-934692-00-X	October 15, 2007
Volume 4: Revenge of the Return	Hack/Slash #5–10	1-934692-18-2	June 29, 2008
Volume 5: Reanimation Games	Hack/Slash #11 non-crossover parts of Hack/Slash #12–13; Hack/Slash #14–17; Hack/Slash Annual	1-934692-44-1	March 18, 2009
Volume 6: In Revenge and In Love	Hack/Slash #18-23; Hack/Slash: Entry Wound	1-934692-68-9	July 29, 2009
Volume 7: New Blood Old Wounds	Hack/Slash #24-28; Vlad and Cassie vs. Bloody Mary	1-934692-83-2	January 27, 2010
Volume 8: Super Sidekick Sleepover Slaughter	Hack/Slash #29-32; Hackoween	1-60706-291-7	September, 2010
My First Maniac	Hack/Slash:My First Maniac #1-4	1-60706-338-7	January 5, 2011
Volume 9: Torture Prone	Hack/Slash Annual #2; Hack/Slash Vol. 2 #1-4, and the story "Night Funeral in Eminence" from Hack/Slash Annual 3	1-60706-409-X	September 14, 2011
Volume 10: Dead Celebrities	Hack/Slash Vol.2 #5-8; Hack/Slash Annual 3	1-60706-508-8	February 1, 2012
Volume 11: Marry, F**k, Kill	Hack/Slash Vol. 2 #9-15	1-60706-656-4	January 15, 2013
Volume 12: Dark Sides	Hack/Slash Vol. 2 #16-19; Hack/Slash vs. Mercy Sparx	1-60706-731-5	April 30, 2013
Volume 13: Final	Hack/Slash Vol. 2 #20-25	1-60706-747-1	July 9, 2013
Omnibus Vol. 1	Hack/Slash: Euthanized; Hack/Slash: Girls Gone Dead; Hack/Slash: Comic Book Carnage; Hack/Slash Vs. Evil Ernie; Hack/Slash: The Land of Lost Toys #1–3; Hack/Slash: Trailers; Hack/Slash: Slashing Through the Snow; Hack/Slash: Slice Hard Prequel; Hack/Slash: Slice Hard; Hack/Slash Vs. Chucky	1-934692-08-5	January 1, 2008
Omnibus Vol. 2	Hack/Slash #1–11 non-crossover parts of Hack/Slash #12–13; Hack/Slash #14–17; Hack/Slash Annual	1-934692-57-3	April 22, 2009
Omnibus Vol. 3	Hack/Slash #18-32; Hack/Slash: Entry Wound; HACKoween; Living Corpse Annual	1-60706-275-5	December 21, 2010
Omnibus Vol. 4	Hack/Slash Vol.2 #1-11; Hack/Slash: Annuals 2-3; ZOMBIES VS. CHEERLEADERS; 2011 Holiday Special	1-60706-526-6	June 12, 2012
Omnibus Vol. 5	Hack/Slash Vol.2 #12-25; HACK/SLASH vs. MERCY SPARX	1-60706-741-2	June 18, 2013
Omnibus Vol. 6	ME WITHOUT YOU material from HACK/SLASH / NAILBITER; HACK/SLASH: SON OF SAMHAIN #1-5; HACK/SLASH RESURRECTION #1-12 and bonus features	978-1-5343-1219-7	June 4, 2019
Son of Samhain Vol. 1	Hack/Slash: Son of Samhain #1-5	978-1-63215-244-2	February 3, 2015
Resurrection Vol. 1	Hack/Slash: Resurrection #1-6	978-1-5343-0666-0	April 25, 2018
Resurrection Vol. 2: Blood Simple	Hack/Slash: Resurrection #7-12	978-1-5343-0879-4	December 19, 2018

Hack/Slash has been collected in the following deluxe hardcovers:

Title	Material collected	ISBN	Date released
Deluxe Edition Volume 1	Hack/Slash: Euthanized; Hack/Slash: Girls Gone Dead; Hack/Slash: Comic Book Carnage; Hack/Slash: Land of Lost Toys #1-3; Hack/Slash: Trailers; Hack/Slash: Slice Hard Pre Sliced Special; Hack/Slash: Slice Hard; Hack/Slash vs. Chucky; Hack/Slash vs. Evil Ernie	978-1-5343-1889-2	April 28, 2021
Deluxe Edition Volume 2	Hack/Slash #1-14; Hack/Slash Annual	978-1-5343-1996-7	October 26, 2021
Deluxe Edition: The Crossovers	Hack/Slash Vampirella #1-5; Hack/Slash vs Eva #1-5; Hack/Slash vs Chaos! #1-5	978-1-5343-2413-8	October 25, 2022
Deluxe Edition Volume 3	Hack/Slash #18-34	978-1-5343-2493-0	May 9, 2023
Deluxe Edition Volume 4	Hack/Slash Vol. 2 #1-11; Hatchet/Slash; Murder Messiah annual Zombies vs. Cheerleaders	978-1-5343-9780-4	May 28, 2024
Deluxe Edition Volume 5	Mercy Sparks: A Slice of Hell; Hack/Slash Vol. 2 #12-25	978-1-5343-5803-4	March 11, 2025

== Adaptations ==
=== Film ===
The possibility of Hack/Slash being made into a live-action film by Rogue was discussed by director Todd Lincoln, writer Martin Schenk, series creator Tim Seeley, and others at the 2006 San Diego Comic-Con, to be released in 2008. In 2009, Todd Lincoln was replaced by Fredrik Bond as director, with Justin Marks writing the screenplay. Stephen Susco was later announced as a co-writer. In 2012, Marcus Nispel, who directed Conan the Barbarian remake, was revealed to have agreed to helm the film for Relativity and Rogue. In October 2015, Relativity announced that the series would instead be adapted into a television series and would be written by Skip Woods, who would serve as executive producer alongside Adrian Askarieh, who first optioned it in 2005. As of 2025, there have been no updates on the prospective series, causing outlets such as /Film to assume that the series is in development hell.

=== Stage plays ===
The series was turned into two stage plays. The 2005 production Hack/Slash: Stage Fright utilized comic book panel simulation and adapted the "Euthanized" and "Girls Gone Dead" storylines. The Chicago Tribune criticized the production for "a choppy collection of scenes separated by extended blackouts, during which the cast needlessly carts on and off a pair of black cubes that double as furniture", while praising Stefani Bishop's acting as Cassie. CBR was more overall favorable of Stage Fright, praising the actors for Cassie and Vlad (Adam Mack), as well as stating that "Just like the comic it's been adapted from, the play is a loving tribute to those great and "so awful they're spectacular" horror films."

A play simply titled "Hack/Slash" ran with the Strangeloop Theatre and CIC Theater in Chicago and played from September 12 through November 1 of 2014. This play adapted various sections from the plot to develop a story while directly coordinating with the author of the original content, Tim Seeley.

=== Other media ===
Cassie has appeared in her own SuicideGirls pictorial.

Filker Seanan McGuire has written and performed a song called "Hack/Slash" about the comic, released on her 2015 album Creature Feature.
