= Tim Seeley =

American comic book artist and writer

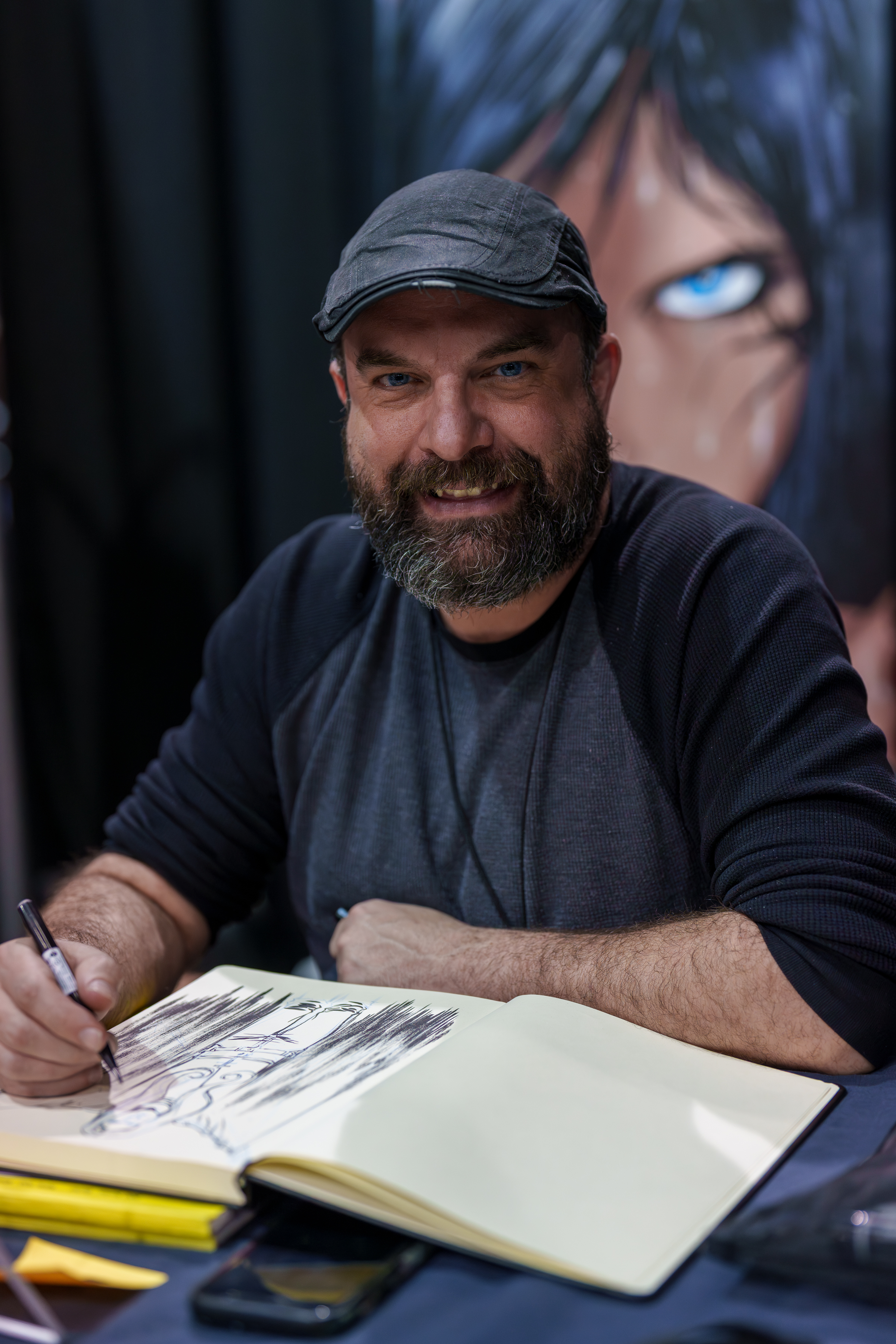
- Seeley at Big Lick Comic Con in Roanoke, Virginia in 2026
- Born: March 7, 1977 (age 49) Wisconsin, U.S.
- Areas: Writer, Artist
- Notable works: Hack/Slash; Revival; G.I. Joe: A Real American Hero; G.I. Joe vs. Transformers; Grayson; Nightwing; Money Shot

Tim Seeley is an American comic book artist and writer known for his work on books such as Grayson, Nightwing, G.I. Joe: A Real American Hero, G.I. Joe vs. Transformers and New Exiles. He is also the co-creator of the Image Comics titles Hack/Slash and Revival.

== Career ==
Seeley has illustrated a variety of comics, including Kore, G.I. Joe: A Real American Hero, G.I. Joe vs. Transformers, and Forgotten Realms: The Dark Elf Trilogy.

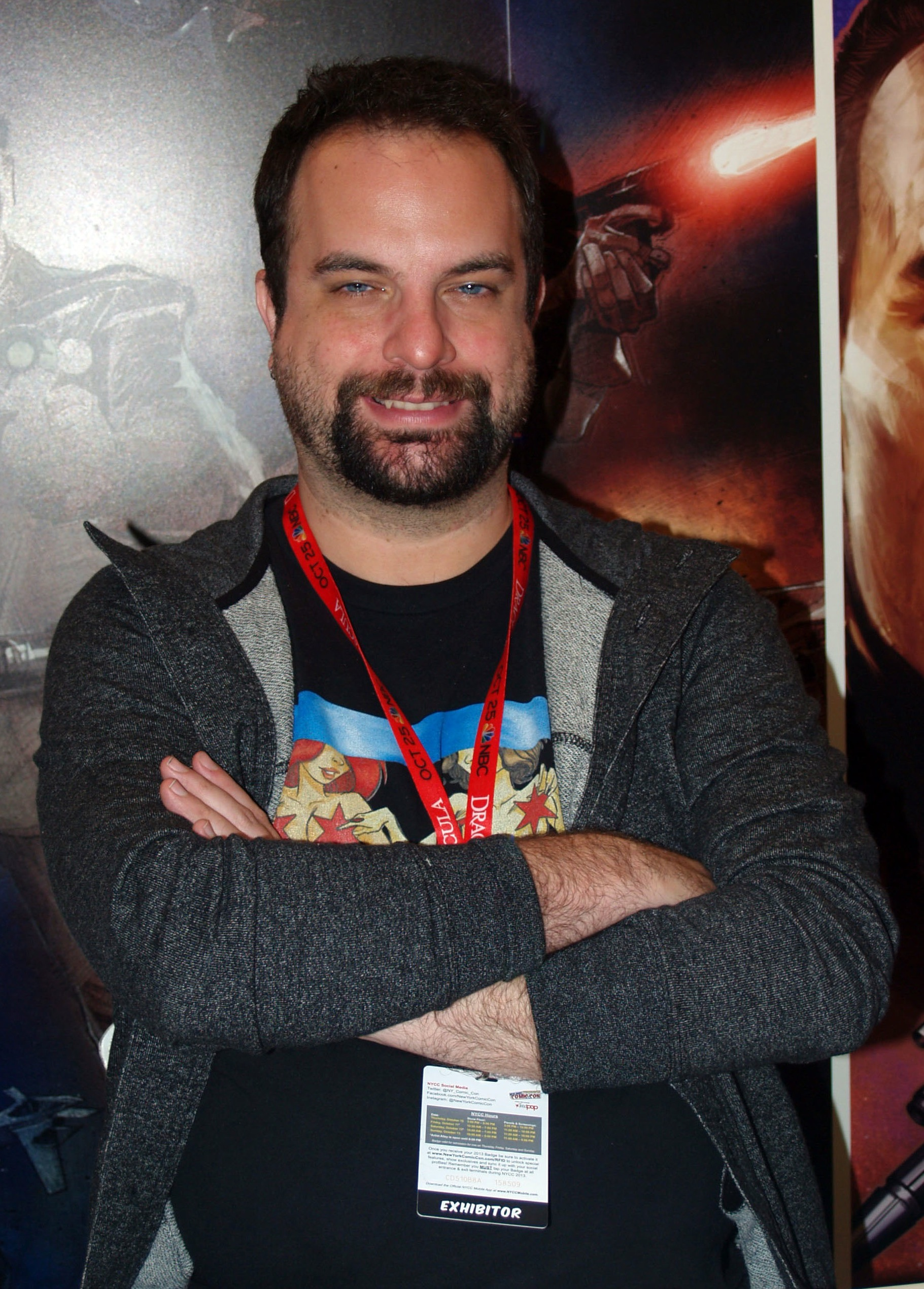
Seeley at the New York Comic Con

Seeley is also the author of the comic Hack/Slash series, and will participate in the production of the Hack/Slash feature film. It was due to be released by Universal Pictures in 2009.

His Image Comics series, Loaded Bible, gained a great deal of attention for its political theme of Jesus vs. Vampires in a post-apocalyptic Christian-run society.

Seeley's webcomic Colt Noble and the Megalords debuted on Nerd City Online on August 3, 2009. In 2010, it was announced he was writing Wild Game, a comic about werewolves. However, the series was never released and he instead went on to release 47 issues, across six years, of Revival.

In 2023, he co-created the series Local Man with Tony Fleecs.

Seeley shares a studio with fellow comics creator and frequent collaborator Mike Norton.

Around 2026, Seeley has worked with Ignition Press, writing two series': No Place and Everyone Loves a Jewel Thief.

== Selected works ==
=== Writer ===
- G.I. Joe: Frontline #18 (Dec. 2003) – Image Comics
- G.I. Joe vs. The Transformers vol. 3 #1–5 (2006) – Devil's Due Publishing
- G.I. Joe vs. Transformers vol. 4 #1, 2 (2007) – Devil's Due Publishing
- Colt Noble & The Mega Lords 44-page one-shot (2009) – Independent
- The Occultist ongoing series (2011–2014) – Dark Horse Comics
- Lovebunny & Mr. Hell Volume 1 (February 2011) – Image Comics
  - Lovebunny & Mr. Hell Secret Origin – Devil's Due Publishing/Image Comics
  - Lovebunny & Mr. Hell A Day In The Love Life – Devil's Due Publishing/Image Comics
  - Lovebunny & Mr. Hell Savage Love – Devil's Due Publishing/Image Comics
  - Lovebunny & Mr. Hell Granny What Big Teeth You Have – Devil's Due Publishing/Image Comics
  - Lovebunny & Mr. Hell Ready To Wear – Devil's Due Publishing/Image Comics
  - Lovebunny & Mr. Hell Too Much To Dream – Devil's Due Publishing/Image Comics
- Bloodstrike #26–33 (2012) – Image Comics
- Revival #1–47 (2012–2017) – Image Comics
- Sundowners #1–11 (2014–2015) – Dark Horse Comics
  - Volume 1 (collects #1–6)
  - Volume 2 (collects #7–11)
- Batman Eternal (with Scott Snyder, James Tynion IV, Ray Fawkes, Kyle Higgins, and John Layman, 2014–2015) collected as:
  - Volume 1 (collects #1–21, tpb, 480 pages, 2014, ISBN 1-4012-5173-0)
  - Volume 2 (collects #22–34, tpb, 448 pages, 2015, ISBN 1-4012-5231-1)
  - Volume 3 (collects #35–52, tpb, 424 pages, 2015, ISBN 1-4012-5752-6)
- Nightwing #30, "Setting Son" (with Tom King, Javier Garrón, Jorge Lucas, and Mikel Janin, DC Comics, 2014)
- Grayson #1–17 (DC Comics, July 2014 – February 2016)
  - Volume 1: Agent of Spyral (hc, 160 pages, 2015) collects:
    - "Grayson" (with Tom King and Mikel Janin, in #1, 2014)
    - "Gut Feeling" (with Tom King and Mikel Janin, in #2, 2014)
    - "The Gun Goes Off" (with Tom King and Mikel Janin, in #3, 2014)
    - "The Raid" (with Tom King and Mikel Janin, in #4, 2015)
    - Grayson: Future's End #1: "Only A Place For Dying" (with Tom King and Stephen Mooney, one-shot, 2014)
    - "The Candidate" (with Tom King and Stephen Mooney, in Secret Origins #8, 2014)
  - Volume 2: We All Die At Dawn (tpb, 160 pages, 2016) collects:
    - "We All Die at Dawn" (with Tim Seeley and Mikel Janin, in #5, 2015)
    - "The Brains of the Operation" (with Tom King and Mikel Janin, in #6, 2015)
    - "Sin by Silence" (with Tom King and Stephen Mooney, in #7, 2015)
    - "Cross My Heart and Hope to Die" (with Tom King and Mikel Janin, in #8, 2015)
    - "A Story of Giants Big and Small" (with Tom King and Stephen Mooney, in Annual #1, 2015)
- Batman and Robin Eternal (with Scott Snyder, James Tynion IV, Genevieve Valentine, Ed Brisson, Steve Orlando, Jackson Lanzing and Collin Kelly, 2015–2016) collected as:
  - Volume 1 (collects #1–13, tpb, 272 pages, 2016, ISBN 1-4012-5967-7)
  - Volume 2 (collects #14–26, tpb, 336 pages, 2016, ISBN 1-4012-6248-1)
- New Suicide Squad #17–21 (with Juan Ferreyra, DC Comics, February–June 2016)
- Nightwing: Rebirth #1 (with Yanick Paquette, July 2016)
- Nightwing vol. 4 #1–20, 22–34 (with Javi Fernandez and Marcus To, DC Comics, July 2016 – December 2017)
- Green Lanterns #33–47 (with Ronan Cliquet, DC Comics, October 2017 – June 2018)
- Shatterstar #1–5 (Marvel Comics, October 2018 – February 2019)
- Dark Red #1–10 (AfterShock Comics, March 2019 – July 2020)
- Bloodshot #1– (Valiant Comics, September 2019 – )
- Money Shot #1– (Vault Comics, October 2019 – )
- Vampire: The Masquerade 1– (Vault Comics, August 2020 – )

=== Penciler ===
- G.I. Joe: A Real American Hero vol. 2 #16, 23–37, 39–43 (2003–2005) – Image Comics
- G.I. Joe: America's Elite #19–20 (2007) – Devil's Due Publishing
- G.I. Joe: Battle Files #1 (2002) – Devil's Due Publishing
- G.I. Joe: Frontline #17 (Nov. 2003) – Image Comics
- G.I. Joe Special Missions: Antarctica (Dec. 2006) – Devil's Due Publishing
- G.I. Joe Special Missions: Brazil (Apr. 2007) – Devil's Due Publishing
- G.I. Joe Special Missions: Manhattan (Feb. 2006) – Devil's Due Publishing
- G.I. Joe Special Missions: Tokyo (Sept. 2006) – Devil's Due Publishing
- G.I. Joe vs. Transformers vol. 2 #1, 2, 4 (2004) – Devil's Due Publishing
- Halloween: 30 Years Of Terror (2008) – Devil's Due Publishing, "Repetition Compulsion" segment
- Halloween: Nightdance #1–4 (2008) – Devil's Due Publishing
- Jennifer's Body – Boom! Studios
- Local Man (backup stories) – Image Comics
- Lovebunny & Mr.Hell Secret Origin – Devil's Due Publishing/Image Comics
- Lovebunny & Mr.Hell Savage Love – Devil's Due Publishing/Image Comics
- Lovebunny & Mr.Hell Granny What Big Teeth You Have – Devil's Due Publishing/Image Comics
- Lovebunny & Mr.Hell Ready To Wear – Devil's Due Publishing/Image Comics
- Lovebunny & Mr.Hell Too Much To Dream – Devil's Due Publishing/Image Comics

=== Covers ===
- G.I. Joe: A Real American Hero vol. 2 #14, 19 (2003) – Image Comics
- G.I. Joe: America's Elite #11, 16–20 (2006–2007) – Devil's Due Publishing
- G.I. Joe: Frontline #17, 18 (2003) – Image Comics
- G.I. Joe: Reloaded #10 (Dec. 2004) – Image Comics
- G.I. Joe Special Missions: Tokyo (Sept. 2006) – Devil's Due Publishing
- G.I. Joe vs. Transformers vol. 2 #1 (2004) – Devil's Due Publishing
- G.I. Joe vs. Transformers vol. 3 #1 (2006) – Devil's Due Publishing
- G.I. Joe vs. Transformers vol. 4 #1 (2007) – Devil's Due Publishing
- Reanimator vol. 1 #1 (2015) – Dynamite Comics
