= Monte Michael Moore =

American illustrator, screenwriter and designer

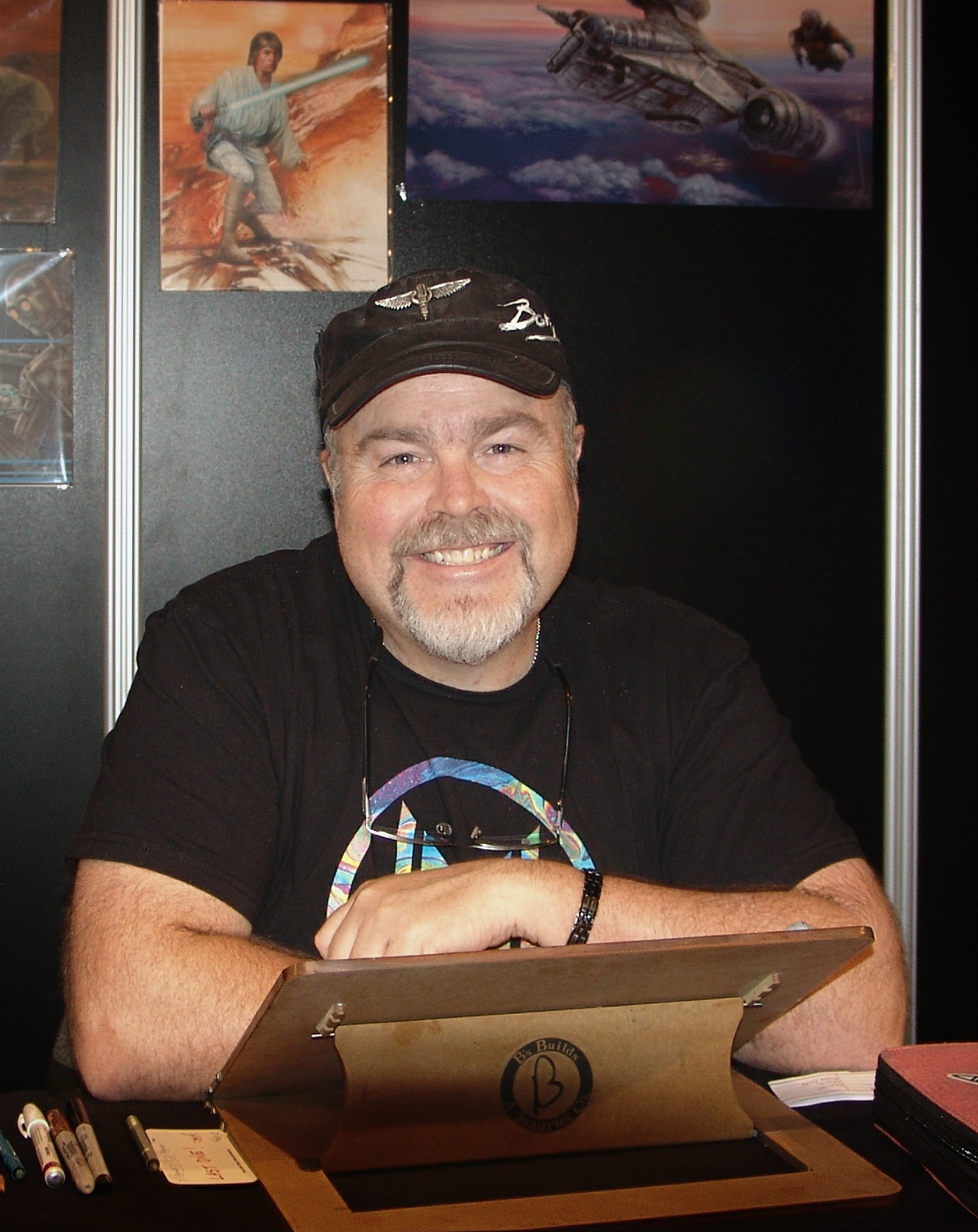
- Moore at the Belgian convention FACTS in 2023
- Born: 1971 (age 53–54); Phoenix, Arizona, U.S.
- Known for: Fantasy art

Monte M. Moore (born 1971) is an American illustrator, screenwriter, and designer focusing on the comics, gaming and entertainment industries.

== Education ==
Monte Moore was born in Phoenix, Arizona in 1971, and grew up playing fantasy role-playing games like Dungeons & Dragons. He graduated from Colorado State University in 1993 with a BFA in Graphic Design/Illustration and was awarded outstanding Senior Portfolio in the State of Colorado from the Art Director's Club of Denver.

During this time, Moore considered artists Hajime Sorayama and Luis Royo to be his inspirations.

== Career ==
Following graduation, Moore created a self-published book, Lords, and printed 3000 copies to sell at the 1993 San Diego Comic Con. He only sold 1000 of them, and later admitted "It gave me a good first hand look into the industry and helped me identify areas that I needed to focus on to increase my chances of success."

He then took on several freelance assignments, including the first cover of Hellina for Lightning Comics, some Vampirella covers for Harris Publications, and worked on both Purgatori and Chastity comics for Chaos! Comics.

In 1998, Moore published a book of his pinup artwork titled Maidens. He moved into the fantasy genre, creating art for the collectible card games Magic the Gathering and Vs. System, and providing illustrations for the third edition of Dungeons & Dragons. He did the artwork for the 2005 card game Wench!.

Moore also started to write screen plays, and one, End of the Road (also known as 1,2,3 Scream) was produced in 2012 starring Doug Jones, Michael Dorn, Robert Picardo, and Zack Ward.

== Reception ==
Reviewing Moore's artbook Majestika for Science Fiction Chronicle, Don D'Ammassa was ambivalent, saying, "Moore is one of those artists who seem to specialize in semi-clad women, which fill many of the pages of this collection of his artwork. After a while, they all seem to look the same, and there is, additionally, something about the composition of many of the pictures that looks hasty and awkward."

In the April 2000 issue of Femmes Fatales, Dan Scapperotti reviewed Moore's artbook Maidens and called Moore's pencil pinups "more whimsical in nature" than many of the more gothic fantasy art being produced".
