= Chastity (character) =

Comics character created by Brian Pulido and Steven Hughes

Publication information
- Publisher: Chaos! Comics (1995–2002); Devil's Due Publishing (2002–2005); Dynamite Entertainment (2010–present)
- First appearance: Evil Ernie: Straight to Hell #1 (Chaos! Comics) (October 1995)
- Created by: Brian Pulido; Steven Hughes

In-story information
- Alter ego: Chastity Marks

Chastity is a fictional horror and superhero comic-book character created by writer Brian Pulido and artist Steven Hughes. She first appeared in Evil Ernie: Straight to Hell #1 (October 1995). Originally produced and published by Chaos! Comics, Chastity and the Chaos! library of characters are now owned and published by Dynamite Entertainment. Chastity is a punk rock fan turned vampire. Undetectable to other vampires and spiteful toward her fellow occult beings, she became an assassin and slayer of vampires. Chastity was one of the most popular "bad girls" among a trend in 1990s comic books.

== Publication history ==
=== Chaos! Comics ===
Initially appearing as a guest character in an Evil Ernie miniseries, Chastity went on to star in her first miniseries in 1997, Theatre of Pain. Four more miniseries, several one-shots and guest appearances followed through 2002, when Chaos! Comics ceased publishing due to bankruptcy. The Chaos! line was sold to comics retailer Tales of Wonder, which then sold them to Devil's Due Publishing. Though other Chaos! characters appeared in titles published by Devil's Due, Chastity did not.

=== Dynamite Entertainment ===
Dynamite Entertainment now owns the Chaos! library and has been publishing titles starring the characters since 2010. Chastity appeared in the imprint-launching title Chaos written by Tim Seeley and drawn by Mirka Andolfo. She has since starred in her own eponymous 2014 miniseries written by Marc Andreyko and drawn by Dave Acosta. Subsequent appearances include the Dynamite crossover event Swords of Sorrow, Alice Cooper vs. Chaos! and a crossover with Tim Seeley's Hack/Slash. In 2019 Dynamite launched a new volume of Chastity written by Leah Williams and drawn by Daniel Maine. She made an appearance in the Vampirella spin-off comic called Sacred Six.

== Fictional character biography ==
=== Original Chaos! Comics ===
Chastity Marks was an average American teenager to begin with. She was born and raised in Toledo, Ohio, by an abusive father. In 1976 Marks – now seventeen years of age – decides to run away from home. Her goal was to travel to London to train with the Royal Shakespeare Company and become an actress. She made it to New York City, and arrived in Manhattan on Halloween, broke and hungry. In order to make some money for food and further travel, she attempted to get a job as a nightclub dancer, but swiftly found the profession not to her liking.

Leaving the club, she was witness to an argument between a black private investigator, Jackie Slade, and the club's manager, as Jackie endeavored to retrieve his young niece from the establishment. The manager attempted to kill Slade, and Chastity stopped him, though they were still far from safe. Slade got Chastity off the premises alive, and gave her all the money he had on him, before going back for his niece again. He died shortly afterwards in the ensuing gunfight.

Finally reaching London, Chastity's dreams of making it as an actress were dashed when she was turned away at the Academy's door. Chastity instead got involved in the newly emerging punk rock scene. Not too much later she was running a late night errand for a band called the Nobs when she was attacked by an obese vampire called Farley. She escaped by stabbing him in the eye with a drumstick, but she didn't get away with her life.

Chastity awoke from the encounter to find that she was a guest of the Countess, a prominent member of the undead community. The Countess explained her new existence to her, and having discovered that she was uniquely undetectable to other vampires, trained her to be an assassin. She spent the next few years trying to stop her new peers from killing her mortal boyfriend, Billy Zone, lead man for the Nobs, and winning the grudging respect of the European Council of vampires.

Chastity returned to America in 1980, again traveling to Manhattan, where she became part of the burgeoning Goth scene. That Halloween she was surprised to see Jackie Slade enter a club she was in and murder apparently innocent musicians. Afterwards she went to the New York Public Library to do some research, and discovered that ever since he died in 1976, his ghost was reported to return each Halloween to slaughter musicians. A bit more digging revealed that his targets, far from being innocent, were members of a group run by a mystery man called Danton, and calling itself the Church of the Immortal. Chastity disguised herself and tried to locate the cult, eventually being captured by some of them and taken to their leader. Danton revealed that he was a six-hundred-year-old demon who drained his victims' life forces to survive, and that he was planning to use his musicians to place subliminal messages in their work so that others would be ensnared by his Church, just as Jackie's niece had been.

Chastity escaped, and feeling indebted to Slade for what he had done years before, she set out to eliminate Danton. Initially he eluded her, but she finally caught up with him during the Greenwich Village Costume Parade, where he was stealing the life forces of those in attendance. On her unfortune, he was too powerful, and far from ending his threat, he managed to drain her life too. This proved to be a mistake; now that he was contaminated with her vampirically tainted energies, Danton finally became vulnerable to Slade. The ghost made short work of the demon, freeing the spirits he had captured, including Chastity and his niece. His last communication with the vampiress was that she should live, for all of Danton's victims, advice she has taken to heart ever since. Following in Slade's footsteps, she tries to fight evil and protect the innocents, because she was one herself once. She'd love to live a normal life, but knows she can't. After Evil Ernie decimated the city in the early 1990s she gained a new goal, to see him eradicated once and for all. After a confrontation with Evil Ernie she suddenly developed a serious crush on him. Later on, she asked him if he wanted to join her in a "relaxing" murder spree in Graceland, but Ernie rejected her.

=== New Chaos! Comics ===
In 1976, teenager Chastity Marks was an American runaway living in London. Punk rock was all the rage, and Chastity was soon running errands for a local band. One night while on the job she was attacked by a vampire. She escaped, but not with her life: Chastity was now a vampire, but with a twist. To the rest of the vampire world, she was completely undetectable.

Today, Chastity works freelance for the Cabal, a secret society of vampires, werewolves, and witches who rule over the monster underworld. As a master martial artist, Chastity serves (on her terms) as the Cabal's most efficient and merciless assassin, all the while trying to live a normal life.

== Chastity comic series ==
=== Chaos! Comics ===
- Evil Ernie: Straight to Hell (1995)
- Chastity: Theatre of Pain (1997)
- Chastity: Rocked (1998–1999)
- Chastity: Lust for Life (1999)
- Purgatori vs. Chastity (2000)
- Chastity: Reign of Terror (2000)
- Untold Tales Of Chastity (2000)
- Chastity 1/2 (2001)
- Chastity Love Bites (2001)
- Chastity: Shattered (2001)
- Bad Kitty: Reloaded (2001)
- Lady Death & Chastity (2002)
- Chastity: Heartbreaker (2002)
- Chastity: Crazy Town (2002)
- United: Lady Death & Chastity & Bad Kitty (2002)
- Chastity: Re-Imagined (2002)

=== Dynamite Entertainment ===
- Chaos (2014)
- Chastity (2014)
- Swords of Sorrow (2015)
- Alice Cooper vs. Chaos! (2015)
- Hack/Slash vs. Chaos! (2018)
- Chastity (2019)
- Red Sonja: Age of Chaos
- Sacred Six
