= Dynamite Entertainment =

American comic book company

- Status: Active
- Founded: 2004; 22 years ago
- Founder: Nick Barrucci
- Country of origin: United States
- Headquarters location: Mount Laurel, New Jersey
- Distribution: Diamond Book Distributors (books); Lunar Distribution
- Key people: Nick Barrucci (CEO, Publisher); Juan Collado (president, COO); Brandon Dante Primavera (VP, IT and Operations); Alan Payne (VP, Sales and Marketing); Jim Kuhoric (VP, Product Development)
- Publication types: Comics
- Fiction genres: Superhero; Action; Adventure; Fantasy; Science fiction
- Official website: www.dynamite.com/htmlfiles/

Dynamite Entertainment is an American comic book publisher founded in 2004 by Nick Barrucci in Mount Laurel, New Jersey, known for publishing comic book adaptations of licensed feature film properties, such as Army of Darkness, Terminator, and RoboCop; licensed or public domain literary properties such as Zorro, Dracula, Sherlock Holmes, Alice in Wonderland, Red Sonja, Tarzan, and John Carter of Mars; and superhero books including Project Superpowers, which revived classic public domain characters, and original creator-owned comics like The Boys.

Creators who have produced Dynamite's books include Alex Ross, John Cassaday, Matt Wagner, Garth Ennis, Howard Chaykin and Frank Miller. Dynamic Forces, a distribution of Dynamite's comics and books, announced a partnership with Diamond Distribution in 2008, when Diamond had the rights to publishing the international versions of books made by Dynamite Entertainment. Dynamite would later leave Diamond after the Diamond bankruptcy and go to Lunar Distribution. Dynamite would also sign a deal with Simon & Schuster which distribute their graphic novels and other items to wider market.

== History ==
Dynamite Entertainment was founded by Nick Barrucci in 2004, initially publishing one comic: Army of Darkness, a miniseries it published through Devil's Due Publishing until it began self-publishing its own titles later that year. After devoting itself to publishing only Army of Darkness, which included a second miniseries, Dynamite published Red Sonja, starting with a 25-cent issue #0. It sold 240,000 copies. Issue #1 of Red Sonja, the first to sell at the full cover price of $2.99, sold 100,000 in initial orders, securing a stable position in the American comic book industry. By 2009, Dynamite was publishing 14–20 comic books and 2–10 collections per month.

Dynamite focuses primarily on comic book adaptations of licensed properties, such as Sherlock Holmes, The Lone Ranger, and Red Sonja. The company also publishes original titles like Project Superpowers, and creator-owned comics like The Boys.

Among its adaptations are those based on classic literature such as Alice in Wonderland, Dracula, and Zorro; television series such as Xena: Warrior Princess Battlestar Galactica, and Buck Rogers, and films such as Darkman, The Good, the Bad and the Ugly, RoboCop, Highlander, and the Terminator franchise.

Its film adaptations also include those of classic monsters such as Dracula, Dr. Jekyll & Mr. Hyde, Frankenstein's Monster, and the Wolfman.

The company gradually built its graphic novel program with titles like Howard Chaykin's American Flagg!, reprints of Marvel Comics' Red Sonja series, and material by creators like Jim Starlin and Jae Lee.

In addition to publishing crossover storylines in which characters from these various properties meet, such as Terminator/RoboCop, and Vampirella/Dracula: Unholy!, Dynamite has also produced intercompany crossover books with other publishers. One, titled "Monster War", was released through Image Comics in 2005, and consisted of several titles that pitted the classic monsters against Top Cow published characters Witchblade, the Darkness, Magdalena, and Tomb Raider. The other was a 2006 crossover with DC Comics' Red Sonja/Claw The Unconquered: Devil's Hands.

In February 2007, Dynamite Entertainment acquired the publishing rights to Garth Ennis' creator-owned series The Boys after the book was cancelled six months into its run by DC Comics' WildStorm imprint.

In 2009 Dynamite announced it would publish new comics featuring Lee Falk's The Phantom.

In 2010, Dynamite began publishing comic books based on The Green Hornet, beginning with a miniseries written by Kevin Smith and followed by Green Hornet: Year One, which was written by Matt Wagner, and another written by Brett Matthews.

In May 2010, Dynamite Entertainment acquired Chaos! Comics' library, which included almost all of that publisher's associated assets, with the exception of Lady Death. Among these properties were the publishing labels Black Label Graphics, Infinity Comics, and the properties Evil Ernie, Smiley The Psychotic Button, Chastity, Purgatori, Jade, Omen, Bad Kitty, Cremator, Lady Demon.

In October 2013, Dynamite announced it would launch a line of comics based on titles originally published by Gold Key Comics, the first of which would be Magnus: Robot Fighter, The Occult Files of Doctor Spektor, Solar: Man of the Atom, and Turok.

In July 2016, author Andy Mangels stated in a New York Times interview that he was writing a new intercompany crossover mini-series for the company, in conjunction with DC Comics, Wonder Woman '77 Meets the Bionic Woman, which brought together the Lynda Carter television version of the Amazon superhero with Jaime Sommers, the cyborg super-heroine played by Lindsay Wagner in the 1970s TV series, The Bionic Woman. The series was released that December.

In July 2019, Sony Pictures Television and Amazon Studios premiered an adapted television series of The Boys for Amazon Prime Video after a brand licensing agreement was granted by Dynamite.

In 2022, Dynamite announced a deal with Disney to create a new line of comics based on various properties, including Gargoyles (TV series) with spin-offs including a Halloween Special, Dark Ages mini series, and Quest mini series, and Darkwing Duck with spin-offs including Negaduck and Justice Ducks, as well as Disney Villains characters including Maleficent, Scar, Hades and Cruella De Vil. They also have the first comic book series on Lilo & Stitch and will be the first American publisher of The Nightmare Before Christmas comics

In October 2023, Dynamite announced a deal with Warner Bros. Discovery to create a new line of comics based on various properties, including ThunderCats, Space Ghost, Jonny Quest, The Powerpuff Girls, The Wizard of Oz, The Flintstones, and We Bare Bears.

Thundercats #1 sold over 170,000 copies.

== List of Dynamite Entertainment titles ==
=== # ===
- 007 #1–6 (August–November 2022)
- 007: For King and Country #1–6 (April–September 2023)

=== A ===
- Adolescent Radioactive Black Belt Hamsters #1–4 (January–June 2008)
- After Earth: Innocence (October 2012)
- Agent 47: Birth of the Hitman #1–6 (2017–June 2018)
- Alice Cooper #1–6 (September 2014–February 2015)
- Alice Cooper vs. Chaos #1–6 (2015–2015)
- Aliens/Vampirella #1–6 (2015–2016; co-published with Dark Horse Comics)
- Alpha and Omega: Cry Wolf #1–8 (June 2010–June 2012)
- Altered Carbon: Download Blues (June 2019)
- Altered Carbon: One Life One Death (May 2022)
- Altered States: Doc Savage (March 2015)
- Altered States: Red Sonja (March 2015)
- Altered States: The Shadow (March 2015)
- Altered States: Vampirella (March 2015)
- Animal Jam #1–3 (2017)
- Ani-Max (August 2010; co-published with Liquid Comics)
- Army of Darkness #5–13 (March 2006–December 2006, the first four issues previously published by Devil's Due Publishing)
  - Army of Darkness vol. 2, #1–27 (August 2007–April 2010)
  - Army of Darkness vol. 3, #1–13 (February 2012–May 2013), #1992.1 (November 2014)
  - Army of Darkness vol. 4, #1–5 (December 2014–April 2015)
- Army of Darkness: Ash for President (September 2016)
- Army of Darkness: Ash Gets Hitched #1–4 (July–November 2014)
- Army of Darkness: Ash Saves Obama #1–4 (August–December 2009)
- Army of Darkness: Ash's Christmas Horror (December 2008)
- Army of Darkness: Ashes 2 Ashes #1–4 (July 2004 – January 2005; co-published with Devil's Due Publishing)
- Army of Darkness: Convention Invasion (October 2014)
- Army of Darkness: Furious Road #1–6 (March–August 2016)
- Army of Darkness: Shop Till You Drop Dead #1–5 (January – July 2005; co-published with Devil's Due Publishing)
- Army of Darkness/Bubba Ho-Tep #1–4 (February–June 2019)
- Army of Darkness/Xena: Why Not? #1–4 (March–July 2008)
- Army of Darkness/Xena: Forever... and a Day #1–6 (2016–2017)
- The Army of Darkness 1979 #1–5 (September 2021–January 2022)
- Army of Darkness Forever #1–13 (October 2023–October 2024)
- The Army of Darkness versus Reanimator: Necronomicon Rising #1–5 (July–November 2022)
- Army of Darkness vs. Hack/Slash #1–6 (July 2013–February 2014)
- Army of Darkness vs. Re-Animator #1–4 (October 2005–February 2006)
- Ash and the Army of Darkness #1–8 (2013–June 2014), Annual (2014)
- Ash vs. the Army of Darkness #0–5 (June–November 2017)
- Army of Darkness/Reanimator (October 2013)
- Athena #1–4 (September 2009–January 2010)
- The Avenger #1–6 (June–November 2015)
- The Avenger: Faces of Justice #1–4 (2017)
- The Avenger: The Television Killers (December 2014)

=== B ===
- Bad Ass #1–4 (January–April 2014)
- Bad Kitty (October 2014)
- Barbarella #1–12 (2017–November 2018)
  - Barbarella vol. 2, #1–10 (July 2021–June 2022)
- Barbarella: The Center Cannot Hold #1–6 (February–August 2023)
- Barbarella/Dejah Thoris #1–4 (January–June 2019)
- Batman/The Shadow #1–7 (June–November 2017; co-published with DC Comics)
- Batman '66 Meets the Green Hornet #1–6 (August 2014–January 2015; co-published with DC Comics)
- Battlefields #1–9 (December 2009–August 2010)
  - Battlefields vol. 2, #1–6 (October 2012–May 2013)
- Battlefields: Dear Billy #1–3 (January–March 2009)
- Battlefields: Night Witches #1–3 (October 2008–January 2009)
- Battlefields: The Tankies #1–3 (April–July 2009)
- Battlestar Galactica #0–12 (June 2006–July 2007)
  - Battlestar Galactica vol. 2, #1–12 (May 2013–June 2014), Annual (April 2014)
  - Battlestar Galactica vol. 3, #1–5 (August—December 2016)
- Battlestar Galactica: Cylon Apocalypse #1–4 (March–June 2007)
- Battlestar Galactica: Cylon War #1–4 (January–April 2009)
- Battlestar Galactica: Death of Apollo #1–6 (December 2014–May 2015)
- Battlestar Galactica: Ghosts #1–4 (October 2008–January 2009)
- Battlestar Galactica: Gods and Monsters #1–5 (2016—2017)
- Battlestar Galactica: Origins #1–11 (December 2007–October 2008)
- Battlestar Galactica: Pegasus (November 2007)
- Battlestar Galactica: Season Zero #1–12 (August 2007–August 2008)
- Battlestar Galactica: Six #1–5 (April 2014–May 2015)
- Battlestar Galactica: Starbuck #1–4 (2013–2014)
- Battlestar Galactica: The Final Five #1–4 (April–July 2009)
- Battlestar Galactica: Zarek #1–4 (December 2006–April 2007)
- Battlestar Galactica Classic #1–5 (October 2006—March 2007)
  - Battlestar Galactica Classic vol. 2, #0–5 (October 2018–May 2019)
- Battlestar Galactica vs. Battlestar Galactica #1–6 (January–June 2018)
- Ben 10 #1– (May 2026–present)
- Bettie Page #1–8 (2017–February 2018), Halloween Special (October 2018)
  - Bettie Page vol. 2, #1–5 (November 2018–May 2019), Halloween Special (October 2019)
  - Bettie Page vol. 3, #1–5 (July 2020–January 2021)
  - Bettie Page vol. 4, #1–4 (July–September 2023)
- Bettie Page: The Alien Agenda #1–5 (March–July 2022)
- Bettie Page: The Curse of the Banshee #1–5 (June–October 2021)
- Bettie Page Unbound #1–10 (June 2019–January 2020)
- Betty Boop #1–4 (2016–2017)
- The Bionic Man #1–26 (August 2011–December 2013), Annual #1 (March 2013)
- The Bionic Man vs. the Bionic Woman #1–5 (January–May 2013
- The Bionic Woman #1–4 (April 2012–July 2013)
- The Bionic Woman Season Four #1–4 (September–December 2014)
- The Black Bat #1–12 (May 2013–July 2014)
- The Black Terror #1–14 (November 2008–February 2011)
  - The Black Terror vol. 2, #1–5 (October 2009–February 2020)
- Blackbeard: Legend of the Pyrate King #1–6 (October 2009–October 2010)
- Blackcross #1–6 (March–November 2015)
- Blood Brothers #1–4 (2017)
- The Blood Queen #1–6 (June 2016–November 2014), Annual (October 2014)
- Blood Queen vs. Dracula #1–4 (March–June 2015)
- Blood Trail: Trailing (May 2013)
- Bob's Burgers #1–5 (August–December 2014)
  - Bob's Burgers vol. 2, #1–16 (June 2015–October 2016)
- Boo: The World's Cutest Dog #1–3 (October 2016)
- The Boys: Dear Becky #1–8 (June 2020–January 2021)
- Brickleberry: Armoogeddon #1–4 (July–October 2016)
- Bring the Thunder #1–4 (December 2010–April 2011)
- Brothers in Arms #1–4 (May–October 2008)
- Buck Rogers #1–12 (April 2009–June 2010), Annual #1 (February 2011)
- Buddha A Story of Enlightenment (November 2010)
- Bullet to the Head #1–6 (June–December 2010)
- Butcher, Baker, Candlestickmaker #1–6 (July–December 2011)

=== C ===
- Cage Hero #1–4 (November 2015–February 2016)
- Captain Action Cat #1–4 (April 2014–September 2014)
- Captain Victory and the Galactic Rangers #1–6 (August 2014–March 2015)
- Cat-Man and Kitten #1 (December 2022)
- Centipede #1–5 (2017)
- Chaos #1–6 (May–October 2014), Holiday Special (December 2014)
- Charlie's Angels #1–5 (June–October 2018)
- Charlie's Angels vs. the Bionic Woman #1–4 (July–October 2019)
- Charmed #1–5 (2017)
- Chastity #1–6 (July–December 2014)
  - Chastity vol. 2, #1–5 (September 2019–February 2020)
- Cherish #1–5 (November 2022–March 2023)
- The Chosen #1–3 (October–December 2012)
- A Clash of Kings #1–16 (June 2017–March 2019)
- A Clash of Kings Part II #1–16 (January 2020–November 2021)
- Classic Red Sonja Re-Mastered #1–4 (June–September 2010)
- Codename: Action (September 2013–February 2014)
- The Complete Alice in Wonderland #1–4 (December 2009–May 2010)
- The Complete Dracula #1—5 (May–December 2009)
- Conan/Red Sonja #1–4 (January–April 2015; co-published with Dark Horse Comics)
- Control #1–6 (June–November 2016)
- Cornboy (June 2011; co-published with Liquid Comics and Periscope Entertainment)
- Crackdown #1–4 (February–October 2019)
- Cryptozoic Man #1–4 (October 2013–February 2014)
- Curse of the Wendigo (January 2012)

=== D ===
- The Damnation of Charlie Wormwood #1–5 (October 2014–March 2015)
- Damsels #1–13 (September 2012–February 2014)
- Damsels: Giant Killer #0 (August 2013)
- Damsels: Mermaids #1–5 (May–September 2013)
- Danger Girl and the Army of Darkness #1–6 (April 2011–August 2012; co-published with IDW Publishing)
- Dark Shadows #1–23 (November 2011–November 2013)
- Dark Shadows: Year One #1–6 (April–September 2013)
- Dark Shadows/Vampirella #1–5 (July–December 2012)
- Darkman vs. Army of Darkness #1–4 (August 2006–March 2007)
- The Darkness/Eva #1–4 (March–June 2008; co-published with Top Cow Productions)
- Darkwing Duck #1–9 (January 2023–present)
- Darkwing Duck #1–10 (January–November 2023)
  - Darkwing Duck, vol. 2 #1–6 (March–September 2025)
- Darkwing Duck: Justice Ducks #1– (January–August 2024)
- Darkwing Duck: Negaduck #1–8 (September 2023–September 2024)
- Dawn/Vampirella #1–5 (September 2014–2015)
- Dead Irons #1–4 (February–June 2009)
- Dead Soldier #1–4 (September–December 2010; co-published with Liquid Comics)
- Dean Koontz's Frankenstein: Prodigal Son Volume Two #1–5 (September 2010–March 2011)
- Dean Koontz's Frankenstein: Storm Surge #1–6 (October 2015–March 2016)
- The Death-Defying Devil #1–4 (December 2008–March 2009)
  - The Death-Defying Devil vol. 2, #1–5 (August 2019–June 2020)
- Death to the Army of Darkness! #1–5 (February–September 2020)
- Dejah of Mars #1–4 (May–September 2014)
- Dejah Thoris #1–6 (2016)
  - Dejah Thoris vol. 2, #0–10 (January–November 2018)
  - Dejah Thoris vol. 3, #1–12 (December 2019–April 2021)
  - Dejah Thoris vol. 4, #1–6 (March–July 2023)
- Dejah Thoris: Fairy Tales (August 2022)
- Dejah Thoris: Winter's End (April 2021)
- Dejah Thoris and the Green Men of Mars #1–12 (February 2013–March 2014)
- Dejah Thoris and the White Apes of Mars #1–4 (April–July 2012)
- Dejah Thoris versus John Carter of Mars #1–6 (July 2021–January 2022)
- The Devilers #1–7 (July 2014–2015)
- Devolution #1–5 (2016)
- Die!namite #1–5 (October 2020–February 2021)
- Die!namite: Blood Red #1–5 (2025)
- Die!namite Lives #1–5 (June–November 2021)
- Die!namite Never Dies #1–5 (March–June 2022)
- Disney Villains: Cruella De Vil #1–5 (January–September 2024)
- Disney Villains: Hades #1–5 (August 2023–January 2024)
- Disney Villains: Maleficent #1–5 (May–October 2023)
- Disney Villains: Scar #1–4 (April–July 2023)
- Django/Zorro #1–7 (November 2014–May 2015; co-published with Vertigo Comics)
- Doc Savage: The Man of Bronze #1–8 (December 2013–July 2014), Annual (May 2014)
- Doc Savage: The Ring of Fire #1–4 (March–July 2017)
- Doc Savage: The Spider's Web #1–5 (2015–2016)
- Doc Savage Special: Woman of Bronze (December 2014)
- Doctor Spektor, Master of the Occult #1–4 (May–November 2014)
- Doodle Jump #1–6 (June 2014–February 2015)
- Draculina #1–6 (February–September 2022)
- Draculina: Blood Simple #1–6 (2023–present)
- The Dresden Files: Dog Men #1–6 (2017)
- The Dresden Files: Down Town #1–6 (February–July 2015)
- The Dresden Files: Fool Moon #1–8 (April 2011–October 2012)
- The Dresden Files: Ghoul Goblin #1–6 (January–August 2013 Dynamite)
- The Dresden Files: Storm Front Volume Two #1–4 (July 2009–September 2010)
- The Dresden Files: War Cry #1–5 (June–October 2014)
- The Dresden Files: Wild Card #1–6 (April–September 2016)
- DuckTales #1–10 (November 2024–present)
- Dying Light (April 2023)

=== E ===
- Elvira in Horrorland #1–5 (May–December 2022)
- Elvira in Monsterland #1–5 (May–September 2023)
- Elvira Meets H.P. Lovecraft #1–5 (February–June 2024)
- Elvira Meets Vincent Price #1–5 (August 2021–March 2022)
- Elvira, Mistress of the Dark #1–12 (July 2018–February 2020), Spring Special (May 2019)
- Eternity Kill (December 2012; co-published with Liquid Comics)
- Eva: Daughter of the Dragon (September 2007)
- Evil Ernie #1–6 (October 2012–June 2013)
  - Evil Ernie vol. 2, #1–6 (October 2014–April 2015)
  - Evil Ernie vol. 3, #1–5 (December 2021–April 2022)
- Evil Ernie: Godeater #1–6 (August 2016–2017)
- Ex-Con #1–5 (September 2014–January 2015)
- The Expendables #1–4 (May–July 2010)

=== F ===
- Fathom Prelude #1 (June 2005; co-published with Aspen Comics)
- Fear Nothing (October 2010)
- Fire and Ice #1–present (July 2023–present)
- Fire and Ice: Nekron (2025)
- Fire and Ice: Teegra (February 2024)
- First Family (October 2010)
- Flash Gordon #1–8 (April 2014–January 2015), Annual (November 2014), Holiday Special (December 2014)
  - Flash Gordon vol. 2, #1–5 (January–May 2015)
- Flash Gordon: Kings Cross #1–5 (2016–2017)
- Flash Gordon: Zeitgeist #1–10 (November 2011–March 2013)
- Freddy vs. Jason vs. Ash #1–6 (November 2007–March 2008; co-published with WildStorm)
- Freddy vs. Jason vs. Ash: The Nightmare Warriors #1–6 (August–December 2009; co-published with WildStorm)
- Fruit Ninja #1 (2017)

=== G ===
- Galactica 1980 #1–4 (September 2009–January 2010)
- A Game of Thrones #1–24 (September 2011–February 2015)
- Garbage Pail Kids: Origins #1–3 (October–December 2022)
- Gargoyles #1–12 (December 2022–March 2024)
- Gargoyles: Dark Ages #1–6 (July 2023–March 2024)
- Gargoyles: Demona #0 FCDB (May 2025)
- Gargoyles: Quest #1–6 (April–December 2024)
- Gargoyles Halloween Special #1 (October 2023)
- Gargoyles Winter Special #1 (December 2024)
- G.I. Joe vs. The Six Million Dollar Man #1–4 (February–May 2018; co-published with IDW Publishing)
- Gold Key: Alliance #1–5 (April–August 2016)
- The Good, the Bad and the Ugly #1–8 (July 2009–February 2010)
- Grand Passion #1–5 (2016–2017)
- Grave Sight Vols. 1–3 (May 2011–March 2012)
- Grave Surprise (December 2016)
- The Great Divide #1–6 (2016–2017)
- The Greatest Adventure #1–9 (April 2017–February 2018)
- Green Hornet #1–35 (February 2010–April 2023), Annual #1–2 (September 2010–January 2012)
  - The Green Hornet vol. 2, #1-13 (March 2013–June 2014)
  - The Green Hornet vol. 3, #1–5 (March–July 2018)
  - The Green Hornet vol. 4, #1–5 (July 2020–January 2021)
- The Green Hornet '66 Meets the Spirit #1–5 (2017)
- The Green Hornet Strikes! #1–10 (May 2010–October 2012)
- The Green Hornet: Aftermath #1–4 (April–July 2011)
- Green Hornet: Blood Ties #1–4 (October 2010–February 2011)
- The Green Hornet: Golden Age Remastered #1–8 (August 2010–February 2011)
- Green Hornet: Legacy #35–42 (April–October 2013)
- Green Hornet: One Night in Bangkok (January 2023)
- The Green Hornet: Parallel Lives #1–5 (June–November 2010)
- The Green Hornet: Reign of the Demon #1–4 (2016–2017)
- The Green Hornet: Year One #1–12 (March 2010–September 2011), Special #1 (January 2012)
- Green Lantern/Miss Fury #1–5 (January–May 2025)
- Grimm #1–12 (May 2013–April 2014)
  - Grimm vol. 2, #1–5 (September 2016–2017)
- Grimm: The Warlock #1–4 (December 2013–March 2014)
- Grumpy Cat (and Pokey!) (February–July 2016), Halloween ComicFest (October 2016)
- Grumpy Cat/Garfield #1–3 (August 2017–October 2017; co-published with Boom! Studios)
- Gwar: Orgasmageddon #1–4 (2017)

=== H ===
- H2O (February 2011; co-published with Liquid Comics)
- Hack/Slash vs. Chaos! #1–5 (December 2018–May 2019)
- Hack/Slash vs. Vampirella #1–5 (October 2017–February 2018)
- Hack/Slash/Eva: Monster's Ball #1–4 (May–November 2011)
- Hell Sonja #1–5 (January–May 2022)
- Hercules #1–6 (April–November 2024)
- Herogasm #1–6 (2009)
- Highland Laddie #1–6 (August 2010–January 2011)
- Highlander #0–12 (July 2006–November 2007)
- Highlander: Way of the Sword #1—4 (December 2007–April 2008)
- Highlander Origins: Kurgan #1–2 (January–February 2009)
- The Hollows: A Hollowland Graphic Novel (June 2014)
- Homies #1–4 (2016)

=== I ===
- Immortal Red Sonja #1–10 (April 2022–February 2023)
- Intertwined (2016–2017)
- The Invincible Red Sonja #1–10 (May 2021–September 2022)

=== J ===
- James Bond 007 #1–12 (2015–2016)
- James Bond 007: Felix Leiter #1–6 (2017)
- James Bond 007: Hammerhead #1–6 (2016–2017)
- James Bond 007: M (February 2018)
- James Bond 007: Moneypenny (August 2017)
- James Bond 007: Origin (September 2018–August 2019)
- James Bond 007: Service (2017)
- Jeepers Creepers #1–5 (April–September 2018)
- Jennifer Blood #1–36 (February 2011–February 2014), Annual #1 (July 2012)
  - Jennifer Blood vol. 2, #1–10 (October 2021–July 2022)
- Jennifer Blood: Battle Diary #1–5 (November 2023–June 2024)
- Jennifer Blood: Born Again #1–5 (August–December 2014)
- Jennifer Blood: First Blood #1–6 (September 2012–July 2013)
- Jennifer Blood Presents: Giulietta Romeo Hitwoman (December 2022)
- John Carter: The End #1–5 (2017)
- John Carter of Mars #1–5 (April–August 2022)
- John Carter, Warlord of Mars #1–14 (November 2014–2015)
- John Wick #1–5 (November 2017–February 2019)
- Jonny Quest #1–5 (August–December 2024)
- Jungle Girl #0–5 (September 2007–March 2008)
- Jungle Girl Season 2 #1–5 (November 2008–July 2009)
- Jungle Girl Season 3 #1–4 (April–July 2015)
- Jungle Jim #1–4 (February–May 2015)
- Justice, Inc. #1–6 (August 2014–January 2015)

=== K ===
- Karma (September 2022)
- Kato #1–14 (May 2010–October 2011), Annual #1 (February 2011)
- Killer Instinct #1–6 (September 2017–April 2018)
- Killing Red Sonja #1–5 (March–December 2020)
- King Kong: The Great War #1–4 (May–August 2023)
- Kings Quest #1–5 (May–September 2016)
- Kings Watch #1–5 (September 2013–April 2014)
- Kirby: Genesis #0–8 (May 2011–July 2012)
- Kirby: Genesis – Captain Victory #1–6 (November 2011–July 2012)
- Kirby: Genesis – Dragonsbane #1–6 (January–June 2013)
- Kirby: Genesis – Silver Star #1–6 (November 2011–June 2012)
- Kiss #1–10 (October 2016–August 2017)
- Kiss Zombies #1–5 (November 2019–March 2020)
- Kiss: Blood and Stardust #1–5 (October 2018–March 2019)
- Kiss: Forever (2017)
- Kiss: Phantom Obsession #1–4 (August 2021–January 2022)
- Kiss: The Demon #1–4 (2017)
- Kiss: The End #1–5 (April–September 2019)
- Kiss/Army of Darkness #1–5 (February–July 2018)
- Kiss/Vampirella #1–5 (June–October 2017)

=== L ===
- Lady Demon #1–4 (December 2014–April 2015)
- Lady Hel #1–4 (August–December 2022)
- Lady Rawhide #1–5 (August 2013–April 2014)
- Lady Rawhide/Lady Zorro #1–4 (2015)
- Lady Zorro #1–4 (July–October 2014)
- The Last Phantom #1–12 (August 2010–February 2012), Annual #1 (November 2011)
- Legendary Talespinners #1–3 (February–June 2010)
- Legenderry: A Steampunk Adventure #1–7 (December 2013–September 2014)
- Legenderry: Green Hornet #1–5 (February–June 2015)
- Legenderry: Red Sonja #1–5 (February–June 2015)
  - Legenderry: Red Sonja vol. 2, #1–5 (February–June 2018)
- Legenderry: Vampirella #1–5 (February–June 2015)
- Legends of Red Sonja #1–5 (November 2013–March 2014)
- The Librarians #1–4 (2017–March 2018)
- Li'l Battlestar Galactica (January 2014)
- Li'l Bionic Kids (January 2014)
- Li'l Ernie (December 2013)
- Li'l Sonja (January 2014)
- Li'l Vampi (January 2014), Holiday Special (November 2014)
- The Living Corpse Exhumed #1–6 (August 2011–February 2012)
- The Living Corpse Haunted (August 2013)
- The Lone Ranger #1–25 (August 2006–May 2011)
  - The Lone Ranger vol. 2, #1–25 (January 2012–June 2014), Annual (September 2013)
  - The Lone Ranger vol. 3, #1–5 (October 2018–February 2019)
- The Lone Ranger & Tonto #1–4 (March 2008–December 2010)
- The Lone Ranger: Snake of Iron #1–4 (July–December 2012)
- The Lone Ranger: The Death of Zorro #1–5 (March–June 2011)
- The Lone Ranger: Vindicated #1–4 (November 2014–February 2015)
- The Lone Ranger/Green Hornet #1–5 (July–November 2016)
- Looking for Group #1–12 (April 2015–March 2016)
- Lord of the Jungle #1–15 (January 2012–May 2013), Annual #1 (May 2012)
  - Lord of the Jungle vol. 2, #1–6 (November 2022–July 2023)
- Lords of Mars #1–6 (August 2013–January 2014)
- Lords of the Jungle #1–6 (March–August 2016)

=== M ===
- Madballs vs. Garbage Pail Kids #1–4 (July–October 2022)
- Madballs vs. Garbage Pail Kids: Time Again, Slime Again #1–4 (February–May 2023)
- Magnus #1–5 (2017)
- Magnus, Robot Fighter #1–12 (March 2014–March 2015), #0 (July 2014)
- The Man with No Name #1–11 (May 2008–June 2009)
- Mandrake the Magician #1–4) (February–September 2015)
- Mars Attacks #1–5 (October 2018–February 2019)
- Mars Attacks Red Sonja #1–5 (August 2020–January 2021)
- Marvel Zombies vs. The Army of Darkness #1–5 (May–August 2007; co-published with Marvel Comics)
- Masks #1–8 (November 2012–June 2013)
- Masks 2 #1–8 (April 2015–November 2015)
- Masquerade #1–4 (February–June 2009)
- Meet the Bad Guys
  - The Green Lama/Bloodlust #1 (August 2009)
  - Fighting Yank/The Revolutionary #2 (October 2009)
  - The Mighty Samson/Dagon #3 (November 2009)
  - The Scarab/Supremacy #4 (November 2009)
- Mercenaries #1–3 (November 2007–January 2008)
- Merciless: The Rise of Ming #1–4 (April–September 2012)
- Mercy Thompson: Hopcross Jilly #1–6 (October 2014–March 2015)
- Mercy Thompson: Moon Called #1–8 (September 2010–September 2011)
- Mighty Mouse #1–5 (2017)
- The Misadventures of Grumpy Cat (and Pokey!) #1–3 (2015)
- Miss Fury #1–11 (April 2013–May 2014)
  - Miss Fury vol. 2, #1–5 (April–August 2016)
- Miss Fury Digital #1–2 (August–October 2013)
- The Mocking Dead #1–5 (September 2013–January 2014)
- Monster War (co-published with Top Cow Productions)
  - The Magdalena vs. Dracula #1 (June 2005)
  - Tomb Raider vs. The Wolf-Men #2 (July 2005)
  - Witchblade vs. Frankenstein #3 (August 2005)
  - The Darkness vs. Mr. Hyde #4 (September 2005)
- My Little Phony: A Brony Adventure (2014)
- Myopia #1 (November 2016)
- Myopia: The Rise of the Domes (May 2018)

=== N ===
- Nancy Drew #1–5 (June–October 2018)
- Nancy Drew and the Hardy Boys: The Big Lie #1–6 (2017)
- Nancy Drew and the Hardy Boys: The Death of Nancy Drew #1–6 (June–November 2020)
- Nevermore #1–5 (2011)
- The Ninjettes #1–6 (February–August 2012)
  - The Ninjettes vol. 2, #1–5 (September 2022–January 2023)
- Noir #1–5 (November 2013–March 2014)
- Nowhere Man #1–4 (January–July 2012)
- Nyx #1–10 (November 2021–October 2022)

=== O ===
- Obey Me #0–5 (March–August 2019)
- The Owl #1–4 (July–October 2013)

=== P ===
- Painkiller Jane #1–3) March–August 2006)
  - Painkiller Jane vol. 2,#0–5 (April 2007–March 2008)
- Pantha #1–6 (June 2012–January 2013)
  - Pantha vol. 2, #1–5 (January–September 2022)
- Path of Exile: Origins (May 2015)
- Pathfinder #1–12 (August 2012–December 2013)
- Pathfinder Special (November 2013)
- Pathfinder: City of Secrets #1–6 (May–October 2014)
- Pathfinder: Goblins! #1–5 (August–November 2013)
- Pathfinder: Hollow Mountain #1–6 (2015–2016)
- Pathfinder: Origins #1–6 (February–August 2015)
- Pathfinder: Runescars #1–5 (May–September 2017)
- Pathfinder: Spiral of Bones #1–5 (March–July 2018)
- Pathfinder: Wake the Dead #1–3 (May 2023–present)
- Pathfinder: Worldscape #1–6 (2016–2017)
- Peter Cannon, Thunderbolt #1–10 (September 2012–July 2013)
  - Peter Cannon, Thunderbolt vol. 2, #1–5 (January–May 2019)
- The Phantom #1–4 (2015)
- The Powerpuff Girls #1–9 (July 2024–March 2025)
- The Precinct #1–5 (2015–2016)
- Prince of Persia: Before the Sandstorm #1–4 (June–November 2010)
- Prince Valiant #1–4 (2015)
- Project Superpowers #0–7 (January–October 2008), #1/2 (2008)
  - Project Superpowers vol. 2, #0–6 (July 2018–February 2019)
- Project Superpowers: Chapter Two #0–12 (June 2009–September 2010)
- Project Superpowers: Chapter Two Prelude (October 2008)
- Project Superpowers: Fractured States #1–5 (April–August 2022)
- Project Superpowers: HeroKillers #1–5 (Msy–September 2017)
- Project Superpowers: X-Mas Carol (December 2010)
- Prophecy #1–7 (June 2012–February 2013)
- Pulse of Power (September 2010)
- Pumpkinhead #1–5 (February–July 2018)
- Purgatori #1–5 (September 2014–January 2015)
  - Purgatori vol. 2, #1–5 (October 2021–February 2022)
- Purgatori Must Die! #1–5 (January–June 2023)

=== Q ===
- Queen Sonja #1–35 (October 2009–April 2013)

=== R ===
- Rainbow Brite #1–5 (October 2018–March 2019)
- Raise the Dead #1–4 (April–July 2007)
- Raise the Dead 2 #1–4 (December 2010–April 2011)
- Re-Animator #0 (2005)
- Reanimator #1–4 (April–July 2015)
- Red Rising: Sons of Ares #1–6 (2017)
- Red Sonja #0–80 (April 2005–August 2013), Annual #1–4 (January 2007–May 2013)
  - Red Sonja vol. 2, #0–18 (July 2014–September 2015), #100 (February 2015)
  - Red Sonja vol. 3, #1–6 (2016)
  - Red Sonja vol. 4, #0–25 (December 2016–January 2019)
  - Red Sonja vol. 6, #1–28 (February 2019–June 2021), Valentine's Day Special (February 2021)
  - Red Sonja vol. 7, #1–12 (September 2021–August 2022), Valentine's Day Special 2022 (February 2022)
  - Red Sonja vol. 8, #1–3 (July 2023–present)
- Red Sonja 1982 (June 2021)
- Red Sonja and Cub (April 2014)
- Red Sonja and Vampirella Meet Betty and Veronica #1–12 (May 2019–July 2020)
- Red Sonja Attacks Mars #1–4 (March–July 2025)
- Red Sonja Halloween Special (October 2018)
- Red Sonja Unchained #1–4 (February–August 2013)
- Red Sonja vs. the Army of Darkness #1–5 (May–September 2025)
- Red Sonja vs. Thulsa Doom #1–4 (January–June 2006)
- Red Sonja: Age of Chaos #1–6 (January–August 2020)
- Red Sonja: Atlantis Rises #1–4 (August–December 2012)
- Red Sonja: Berserker (2014)
- Red Sonja: Birth of the She-Devil #1–4 (June–September 2019)
- Red Sonja: Black White Red #1–8 (July 2021–March 2022)
- Red Sonja: Blue (June 2011)
- Red Sonja: Break the Skin (April 2011)
- Red Sonja: Death and the Devil #1–4 (September–December 2024)
- Red Sonja: Deluge (March 2011)
- Red Sonja: Empire of the Damned #1–5 (April–August 2024)
- Red Sonja: Fairy Tales (August 2022)
- Red Sonja: Lord of Fools (July 2019)
- Red Sonja: Monster Isle (October 2006)
- Red Sonja: One More Day (November 2005)
- Red Sonja: Raven (January 2012)
- Red Sonja: Red Sitha #1–4 (May–August 2022)
- Red Sonja: Revenge of the Gods #1–5 (March–June 2011)
- Red Sonja: Sanctuary (June 2014)
- Red Sonja: Sonja Goes East (January 2006)
- Red Sonja: The Black Tower #1–4 (September 2014–January 2015)
- Red Sonja: The Long Walk to Oblivion (2017)
- Red Sonja: The Price of Blood #1–3 (December 2020–February 2021)
- Red Sonja: Vacant Shell (May 2007)
- Red Sonja: Vulture's Circle #1–5 (January–May 2015)
- Red Sonja: Wrath of the Gods #1–5 (February–June 2010)
- Red Sonja/Conan #1–4 (2015; co-published with Dark Horse Comics)
- Red Sonja/Hell Sonja #1–4 (December 2022–March 2023)
- Red Sonja/Tarzan #1–6 (May–December 2018)
- Red Sonja/The Superpowers #1–5 (January–May 2021)
- Red Team #1–7 (February 2013–March 2014)
- Red Team: Double Tap, Center Mass #1–9 (2016–2017)
- Repairman Jack: Scar-Lip Redux (May 2020)
- RoboCop #1–6 (January–August 2010)
- RoboCop: Road Trip #1–4 (January–March 2012)
- Robotech/Voltron #1–4 (2013–September 2014)
- Robots Versus Princesses #1–4 (August 2018–January 2019)
- Rocketman & Rocketgirl (May 2023)

=== S ===
- Sacred Six #1–12 (July 2020–August 2021)
- Samurai Sonja #1–5 (June–October 2022)
- Savage Red Sonja #1–5 (October 2023–March 2024)
- Savage Red Sonja: Queen of the Frozen Wastes #1–4 (September–November 2006)
- Savage Tales #1–10 (April 2007–November 2008)
  - Savage Tales vol. 2 (July 2022)
- Savage Tales Halloween Special: Featuring Red Sonja (October 2019)
- Savage Tales: Vampirella (May 2018)
- Saved by a Whisker (February 2022)
- Scarlet Sisters (October 2022)
- Seduction of the Innocent #1–4 (2015–2016)
- Shaft #1–6 (December 2014–May 2015)
- Shaft: Imitation of Life #1–4 (February–May 2016)
- Sheena #0–10 (August 2017–July 2018)
- Sheena, Queen of the Jungle #1–10 (November 2021–November 2022
- The Shadow #1–25 (April 2012–May 2014), Annual #1 (September 2012), Annual (September 2013), #0 (July 2014), #100 (June 2015)
  - The Shadow vol. 2, #1–5 (2015)
  - The Shadow vol. 3, #1–6 (August 2017–January 2018)
- The Shadow Now #1–6 (October 2013–April 2014)
- The Shadow over Innsmouth (July 2014)
- The Shadow: Agents of the Shadow (December 2014)
- The Shadow: Midnight in Moscow #1–6 (May–December 2014)
- The Shadow: The Death of Margo Lane #1–5 (June–October 2016)
- The Shadow: Year One #1–10 (February 2013–September 2014)
- The Shadow/Batman #1–6 (October 2017–March 2018; co-published with DC Comics)
- The Shadow/Green Hornet: Dark Nights #1–5 (July–November 2013)
- The Shape of Elvira #1–4 (January–December 2019)
- Sherlock Holmes #1–5 (April–October 2009)
- Sherlock Holmes: Year One #1–6 (February-September 2011)
- Sherlock Holmes: The Liverpool Demon #1–5 (December 2012–June 2013)
- Sherlock Holmes: Moriarty Lives #1–5 (December 2013–July 2014)
- Sherlock Holmes vs. Harry Houdini #1–5 (October 2014–April 2015)
- Sherlock Holmes: The Vanishing Man #1–4 (May–August 2018)
- Silver Scorpion (December 2012; co-published with Open Hands Initiative and Liquid Comics)
- Sirens Gate #1–5 (October 2022–present)
- The Six Million Dollar Man #1–5 (March–July 2019)
- The Six Million Dollar Man: Fall of Man #1–5 (July–November 2016)
- The Six Million Dollar Man: Season Six #1–6 (March–September 2014)
- Skin and Earth #1–6 (2017)
- Smiley the Psychotic Button (January 2015)
- Smosh #1–6 (May–November 2016)
- Solar: Man of the Atom #1–12 (April 2014–May 2015)
- Sonjaversal #1–10 (February–December 2021)
- The Sovereigns #0–5 (April–September 2017)
- The Spider #1–18 (May 2012–March 2014), Annual (October 2013)
- Spider-Man/Red Sonja #1–5 (October 2007–February 2008; co-published with Marvel Comics)
- The Spirit #1–12 (2015–2016)
- The Spirit: The Corpse-Makers #1–5 (February 2017–January 2018)
- Starfinder: Angels of the Drift #1–2 (2023–present)
- Stargate: Daniel Jackson #1–4 (July–November 2010)
- Stargate: Vala Mal Doran #1–5 (May–November 2010)
- Steampunk Battlestar Galactica 1880 #1–4 (August–November 2014)
- Street Magik (October 2006)
- Super Zombies #1–5 (March–July 2009)
- Swashbucklers: The Saga Continues #1–5 (April–August 2018)
- Sweetie: Candy Vigilante #1–6 (October 2022–June 2023)
  - Sweetie: Candy Vigilante vol. 2, #1–6 (February–December 2024)
- The Switch: Electricia (July 2018)
- Sword of Red Sonja: Doom of the Gods #1–4 (October–December 2007)
- Swordquest #0–5 (May–October 2017)
- Swords of Sorrow #1–6 (May–October 2015)
- Swords of Sorrow: Black Sparrow & Lady Zorro (2015)
- Swords of Sorrow: Chaos! Prequel (May 2015)
- Swords of Sorrow: Dejah Thoris & Irene Adler #1–3 (2015)
- Swords of Sorrow: Masquerade & Kato (May 2015)
- Swords of Sorrow: Miss Fury & Lady Rawhide (2015)
- Swords of Sorrow: Pantha & Jane Porter (2015)
- Swords of Sorrow: Red Sonja & Jungle Girl #1–3 (2015)
- Swords of Sorrow: Vampirella & Jennifer Blood #1–4 (May–August 2015)

=== T ===
- Tales of Army of Darkness (February 2006)
- Terminal Hero #1–6 (August 2014–February 2015)
- Terminator: Infinity #1–7 (July 2007–March 2008)
- Terminator: Revolution #1–6 (December 2008–June 2009)
- Terminator/RoboCop: Kill Human #1–4 (July–November 2011)
- A Thousand Arts (October 2010; co-published with Liquid Comics)
- Thulsa Doom #1–4 (September–December 2009)
- Thunda #1–5 (August–December 2012)
- ThunderCats #1–22 (February 2024–present)
- ThunderCats: Apex (December 2024)
- ThunderCats: Cheetara #1–5 (July–December 2024)
- ThunderCats: Cheetara - Worldbreaker (2015)
- Tom Clancy's Splinter Cell: Echoes #1–4 (July–September 2014)
- Total Recall #1–4 (May–December 2011)
- A Train Called Love #1–10 (2015–July 2016)
- Turok #1–5 (August–December 2017)
  - Turok vol. 2, #1–5 (January–September 2019)
- Turok: Dinosaur Hunter #1–12 (February 2014–February 2015)
- The Twilight Zone #1–12 (December 2013–February 2015), Annual (June 2014)
- The Twilight Zone: 1959 (2016)
- The Twilight Zone: Lost Tales (October 2014)
- The Twilight Zone: Shadow & Substance #1–4 (January–April 2015)
- The Twilight Zone/The Shadow #1–4 (April–July 2016)

=== U ===
- Unbreakable Red Sonja #1–5 (October 2022–April 2023)
- Uncanny #1–6 (June 2013–February 2014)
- Uncanny: Season Two #1–5 (April–August 2015)
- Untouchable (December 2010; co-published with Liquid Comics)

=== V ===
- Vampire Huntress: The Hidden Darkness #1–4 (August 2010–May 2011)
- Vampirella #1–38 (November 2010–February 2014), Annual #1–2 (December 2011–August 2012), Annual (December 2013), #666–675 (February 2024–March 2025)
  - Vampirella vol. 2, #1–13 (June 2014–June 2015), #100 (January 2015), Annual (2015)
  - Vampirella vol. 3, #1–6 (March–August 2016)
  - Vampirella vol. 4, #1–11 (2017–March 2018)
  - Vampirella vol. 5, #1–25 (July 2019–November 2021)
  - Vampirella vol. 6, #1–10 (March 2025–present)
- Vampirella Valentine's Day Special (February 2019, February 2021, February 2022)
- Vampirella Halloween Special (October 2013, October 2018)
- Vampirella Helliday Special (December 2024)
- Vampirella Holiday Special (November 2021)
- Vampirella: Dark Reflections #1–5 (June–October 2024)
- Vampirella: Dead Flowers #1–4 (October 2023–January 2024)
- Vampirella: Fairy Tales (August 2022)
- Vampirella: Feary Tales #1–5 (October 2014–February 2015)
- Vampirella: Mindwarp #1–5 (September 2022–January 2023)
- Vampirella: Nublood (February 2013)
- Vampirella: Prelude to Shadows (October 2014)
- Vampirella: Roses for the Dead #1–4 (June 2018–June 2019)
- Vampirella: Southern Gothic #1–5 (August 2013–February 2014)
- Vampirella: The Dark Powers #1–5 (December 2020–April 2021)
- Vampirella: The Red Room #1–4 (April–November 2012)
- Vampirella: Trial of the Soul (September 2020)
- Vampirella: Year One #1–6 (July 2022–April 2023)
- Vampirella 1969 (2015)
- Vampirella and the Scarlet Legion #1–5 (May–October 2011)
- Vampirella Strikes #1–6 (January–June 2013)
  - Vampirella Strikes vol. 2, #1–13 (May 2022–May 2023)
- Vampirella vs. Dracula #1–6 (January–August 2012)
- Vampirella vs. Fluffy the Vampire Killer (October 2012)
- Vampirella vs. Purgatori #1–5 (March–July 2021)
- Vampirella vs. Reanimator #1–5 (December 2018–April 2019)
- Vampirella versus Red Sonja #1–5 (November 2022–March 2023)
- Vampirella versus The Superpowers #1–5 (May–September 2023)
- Vampirella/Army of Darkness #1–4 (2015)
- Vampirella/Dejah Thoris #1–4 (September 2018–February 2009)
- Vampirella/Dracula: Rage #1–6 (August 2023–April 2024)
- Vampirella/Dracula: Unholy #1–6 (December 2021–June 2022)
- Vampirella/Red Sonja #1–12 (September 2019–December 2020)
- Vampiverse #1–6 (September 2021–February 2022)
- Vampiverse Presents: The Vamp (June 2022)
- Vengeance of Vampirella #1–25 (October 2019–December 2021)
- Victory #1–5 (June–September 2023)
- Voltron #1–12 (December 2011–May 2013)
- Voltron: From the Ashes #1–12 (2015–2016)
- Voltron: Year One #1–12 (April–December 2012)

=== W ===
- Warehouse 13 #1–5 (August 2011–April 2012)
- Warlord of Mars #1–35 (October 2010–April 2014), Annual #1 (January 2012), #100 (April 2014), #0 (July 2014)
- Warlord of Mars: Dejah Thoris #1–37 (March 2011–March 2014)
- Warlord of Mars: Fall of Barsoom #1–5 (July 2011–January 2012)
- Warlord of Mars Attacks #1–5 (June–October 2019)
- Warriors of Mars #1–5 (January–October 2012)
- The Warriors: Official Movie Adaptation #3–5 (August 2010–February 2011, the first two issues previously published by Dabel Brothers Productions)
- The Wheel of Time #1–35 (March 2010–June 2013)
- The Wheel of Time: The Great Hunt #1–6 (November 2023–May 2024)
- Widow Warriors #1–4 (July–October 2010)
- Witchblade: Demon Reborn #1–4 (August–November 2012; co-published with Top Cow Productions)
- Witchblade/Red Sonja #1–5 (February–July 2012; co-published with Top Cow Productions)
- WolfCop #1–3 (2016)
- Wonder Woman '77 Meets the Bionic Woman #1–6 (December 2016–September 2017; co-published with DC Comics)

=== X ===
- Xena: Warrior Princess #1–4 (July–November 2006), Annual #1 (January 2007)
  - Xena: Warrior Princess vol. 2, #1–4 (May–September 2007)
  - Xena: Warrior Princess vol. 3, #1–6 (April–September 2016)
  - Xena: Warrior Princess vol. 4, #1–10 (February–November 2018)
  - Xena: Warrior Princess vol. 5, #1–6 (April–September 2019)
- Xena/Army of Darkness: What... Again?! #1-4 (October 2008–January 2009)

=== Y ===
- Yoga Hosers: When Colleens Collide (2016)

=== Z ===
- Z Nation #1–6 (April–October 2017)
- Zorro #1–20 (February 2008–February 2010)
- Zorro: Matanzas #1–4 (February–May 2010)
- Zorro Rides Again #1–12 (August 2011–October 2012)
