= Brian Pulido =

American film producer

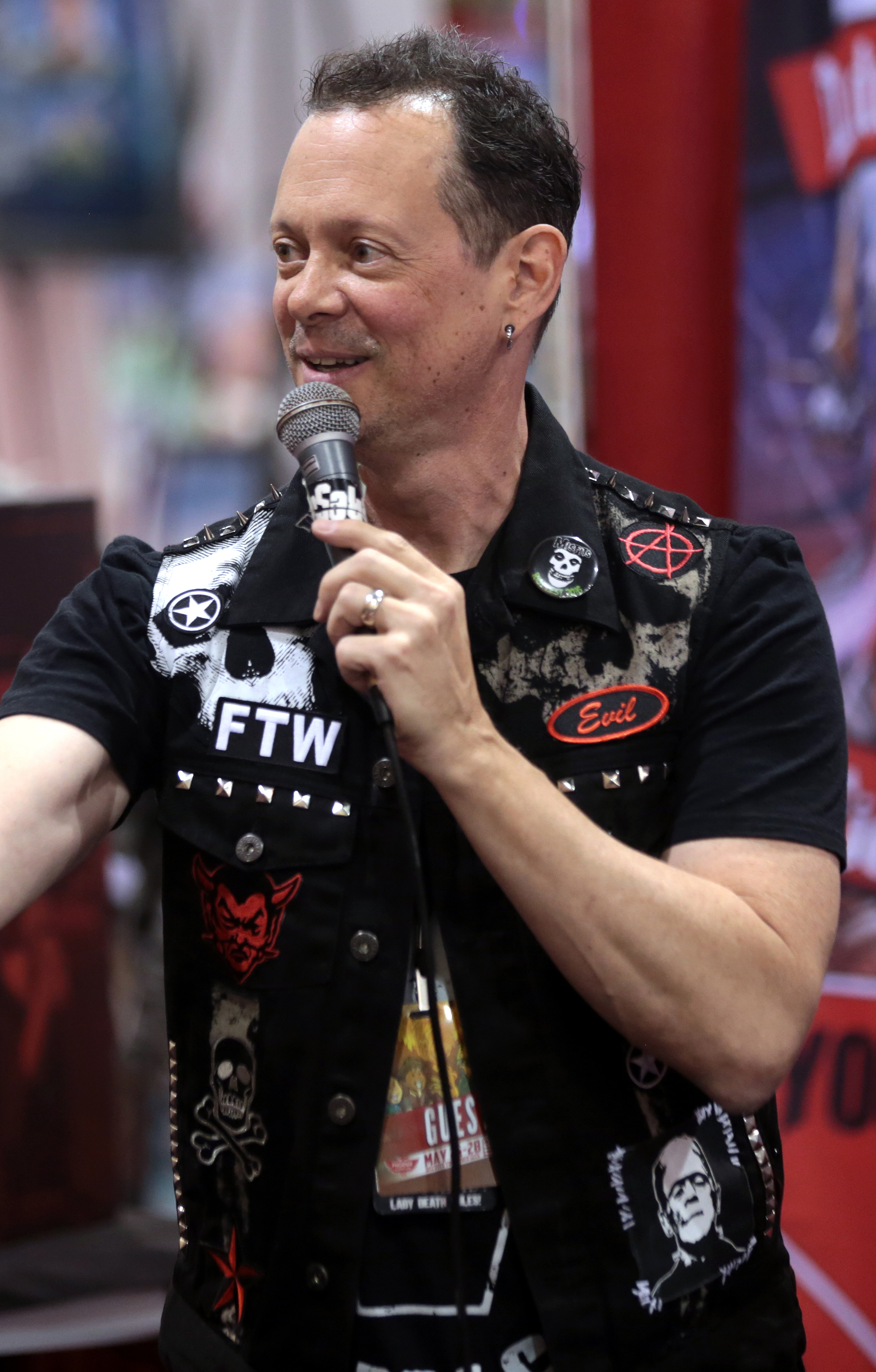
- Pulido at the 2017 Phoenix Comicon
- Born: November 30, 1961 (age 64)
- Areas: Writer, Penciller, Publisher
- Notable works: Lady Death, Evil Ernie
- Awards: Inkpot Award (2018)

Brian Pulido (born November 30, 1961) is an American creator, writer and producer of comic books, magazines and films

== Early life ==
Growing up in Long Branch, New Jersey, Pulido first developed an interest in the horror genre after the release of Night of the Living Dead when he was a child.

== Comic book career ==
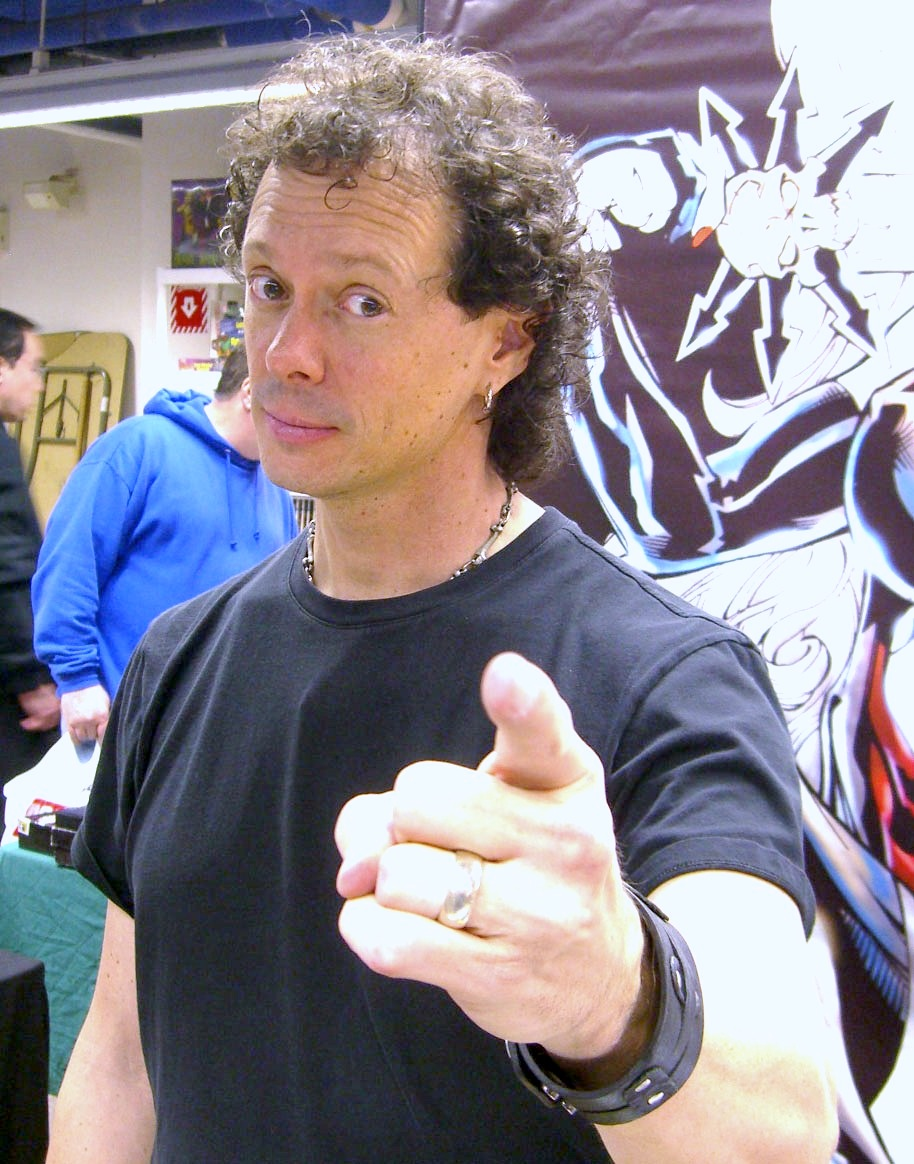
Pulido at the Big Apple Con, November 14, 2008

Pulido has created, written or co-written numerous comic books, including Lady Death, Evil Ernie, Purgatori, Chastity, Smiley The Psychotic Button, Cremator, Bad Kitty, Jade, Lady Demon, Bedlam and The Undead. He has written or published stories for World Wrestling Entertainment, Universal's The Mummy, Halloween, Megadeth and Insane Clown Posse. His stories have been published by Marvel Comics and Dark Horse Comics, among others.

Pulido's comics work also includes stories based on New Line Cinema's A Nightmare on Elm Street, Friday the 13th and Texas Chain Saw Massacre (this one, with Daniel HDR art, was nominated as Best Screen-to-Comic Adaptation, on the TV Scream Awards) from Avatar Press, as well as the monthly Lady Death and Medieval Lady Death. With Avatar Press, he launched all new supernatural creations Belladonna, Gypsy, War Angel, Killer Gnomes and Unholy.

In 1998, Pulido packaged a five-issue weekly miniseries for Marvel called The Supernaturals with writing by Marc Andreyko and art by Ivan Reis. That series included redesigns of characters such as Ghost Rider, Brother Voodoo and Satana.

Pulido was the president of Chaos! Comics until it closed in 2002.

In 2015, Pulido founded Coffin Comics, an independent comic book publisher.

== Film career ==
Pulido created, produced and wrote the story for ADV Films' animated feature, Lady Death: The Motion Picture. He wrote, produced and directed the short horror film, There's Something Out There, which has played at numerous film festivals.

Pulido wrote and directed the film The Graves, which was released in 2009, and his follow project is entitled Damnation. As of mid-February 2014 he is currently working on a project called Zack the Zombie Exterminator.

== Awards and recognition ==
- November 2012 Inkwell Awards Ambassador (November 2012 – present)
