= Purgatori =

- Sakkara/Purgatori

Publication information
- Publisher: Chaos! Comics (1994–2002); Devil's Due Publishing (2005–2006); Dynamite Entertainment (2010–present)
- First appearance: Evil Ernie: Revenge #1 (October 1994)
- Created by: Brian Pulido (writer); Steven Hughes (artist)

In-story information
- Alter ego: Sakkara; Tori Sachs (Altered States: Purgatori: Grindhouse)
- Species: Vampire/cambion
- Abilities: Super strength, speed, agility, healing, flight, 'blood magic'

Purgatori is a fictional comic book character, created by writer Brian Pulido and artist Steven Hughes. A crimson-skinned, winged vampire goddess, she first appeared in Evil Ernie: Revenge #1 (October 1994), published by Chaos! Comics. She has since appeared in books published by Devil's Due Publishing (2005–2006). Following Dynamite Entertainment's acquisition of the Chaos characters in 2010, Puragori has since appeared in their rebooted Chaos line of comics, as well as several crossover events.

== History ==
=== Original Chaos Comics (1994-2002) ===
==== In Egypt as Sakkara ====
Purgatori was born in Ancient Egypt around 1390 BC, and raised in the city of Alexandria. Her parentage is unknown, save that she has the blood of the Fallen Angels in her veins. Her human name is Sakkara, and she was part of the team of slaves that built the burial tomb for Queen Ostraca. Sakkara's job was to grind corn all day under the desert sun, and she was constantly whipped by the brutish male guards. Amongst the slaves was a foreigner, an old man of Celtic origin who told Sakkara he knew a way to escape slavery and achieve immortality.

One day, Sakkara was grinding corn, when the Queen came to inspect the progress of her tomb. Sakkara was in the way of her chariot and narrowly escaped being run over. Ostraca wanted to punish Sakkara for not moving quick enough, but as soon as she saw her she was mesmerized by her beauty and her blue eyes. The Queen was well known for her love of women, and Sakkara became the newest acquisition to her harem. The two were married, and for a year Sakkara lived a life of luxury.

In Egypt, the situation with the citizens of Alexandria had grown steadily worse. The Queen realized that if they rebelled, she would never get her tomb finished. The general of her army, Ramses, made her an offer: if she married him and made him pharaoh, he would keep the population in check and ensure the completion of the tomb. He had one condition: Ramses must be her only lover, and all of her harem must die. Sakkara returned to the palace one night to find all the other girls dead. She fled into the night, in search of the old Celtic slave and his secret of immortality.

She found the old man as he was being attacked by guards. She killed them and he lived long enough to direct her across the desert to a cave set into a mountain peak. There she met Rath, an ancient Celtic vampire. She wanted to gain immortality for her revenge; he wanted a weapon to help him turn man from the civilized path to the wild ways that Rath advocated. Rath drank Sakkara's blood and fed her some of his own, turning her into a vampire. As Rath's blood mixed with her own, it combined with the strange blood of the Fallen Angels within her, transforming her into a creature with blood red skin, horns, glowing white eyes, and bat-like wings.

Sakkara returned to the Queen's temple on her wedding night and attacked the married couple and their guests. Amongst them were the samurai Jade and her father, and Kabala and her husband from Africa. Sakkara bit Jade and Kabala, turning them into vampires. She incited the citizens of Alexandria to rebellion, and they demolished the city. She then bit Ramses and Ostraca and entombed them in the Queen's burial sarcophagus. They were rescued five days later, but by then they had turned vampiric - starved of blood, they were wizened and insane, and would stay that way forever.

==== In Necropolis as Purgatori ====
Sakkara left the city and set about a new task: having learned that the blood of gods, and especially a god in torment, holds extreme power, she began work to attract the attention of Lucifer. He eventually came to her, entranced by her dark and savage nature, and took her to Hell. He intended to marry her, but she had other ideas: as soon as he joined her in his bedchamber, she bit him and drank from him. Infuriated, but impressed by her spirit, he cast her through the Nexus of All Things, exiling her to the city of Necropolis. Lucifer also gave her a new name: Purgatori.

Purgatori stayed in Necropolis for millennia, feasting on its occupants and acquiring a pet chimera. She was unable to pass through the Nexus, but one day she saw the soul of Marion, Lady Death's mother, passing on its way to Heaven. She intercepted it with the help of her chimera, and kept her in Necropolis for over 400 years, studying her and the Nexus to see if there was a way she could return to Hell. Her hand was forced by Lady Death: with the disappearance of Lucifer, the Fallen Angels were moving on Hell in a bid to rule it. They attacked Necropolis first and Purgatori was forced to flee. Risking all, she used Marion's soul to travel through the Nexus and ended up in Hell. This was the home of Lady Death now, and Purgatori knew all about her from studying Marion. She knew her blood would be rich in power, and she wanted both her blood and the soul of Lucifer, now trapped inside Lady Death.

==== In Hell: Against Lady Death and Lucifer ====
Camping by the River Styx with her new jackal pets, she located Cremator, lost after the battle for Hell, and entranced him, turning him against Lady Death and setting him to forge a magical sword for her to reclaim Lucifer's soul. Casting a spell to sever the psychic link between Lady Death and Evil Ernie and dealing harshly with Mary Young who had turned up in Hell to kill Lady Death, she set about tormenting Lady Death in order to make her blood all the richer and sweeter.

After getting Cremator to attack Lady Death, Purgatori attacked her herself. In a long battle she lost her jackals to the Nameless Wolves but beat Lady Death. When she impaled her with Cremator's sword, her magic backfired, hurting her and allowing Lady Death to escape. Lady Death plunged Purgatori into the Styx, impelling her to tell her the truth, and Purgatori revealed that Lucifer's soul had never actually been inside Lady Death. He reappeared at that moment to confirm the point: he had been playing her for a fool as one of his games. Annoyed at having his hand shown, he took Purgatori to Dis and tortured her while taking Lady Death and turning her into a creature of evil — Lady Demon.

The next day, she was forced to fight Lady Demon in Hell's Arena. Still very weak after being tortured, Purgatori lost the fight, but still refused to submit to Lady Demon and reveal to her where Marion's soul was. Lady Demon drained her of her powers and cast her through the Nexus, sending her to the one place she loathed more than any other: Earth. With her power gone, the Separation spell began to erode.

==== On Earth: Against Jade, Kabala, and Rath ====
Purgatori arrived in San Francisco on 13 October 1995, and immediately became a victim to the ravenous thirst that is a vampire's own form of slavery. She secured a victim at a local lesbian S&M bar and was attacked by a tormented creature who called himself The Faithless One. She killed him in short order, at the very instant of the Pandora Effect.

Her arrival back on Earth had been noticed: Jade and Kabala contacted her psychically, telling her of their intention to kill her, and Rath too began to track her. Realising she was too weak to fight them, Purgatori stowed away on a freighter and made her way back to Alexandria, hoping to confront her enemies on home turf. She was ambushed by Jade, who mindprobed her to find out what both she and Kabala wanted to know - why they had been made into vampires. Purgatori managed to force an image of Lucifer onto her, a vision that horrified Jade and knocked her off-guard. Purgatori drank her blood but lost it almost immediately when Rath chose that very moment to attack, draining her of her newly acquired power and taking her to be interrogated.

Rath offered to save her from her enemies if she would accept him as her master. She refused, and he left her to be captured by Jade and Kabala. Taken to Africa, they probed her mind and were enraged to find that they had been created as a mistake, in a moment of passion. They tortured Purgatori, trying to make her beg for her life, but she denied them too. Rath arrived and told her he had just been testing her limits. When he was attacked by the samurai, Purgatori was drenched with his blood and absorbed tremendous amounts of power. She killed Kabala and Jade escaped. Rath offered to teach her again but she spat in his face, unwilling to side with someone who had used her in such a way.

==== Prelude to Vampire Wars ====
Returning to the United States, she began to come across traces of Dracula. She set off to find him, and finally tracked him down in his castle. They had sex, Dracula swearing his loyalty to her.

Purgatori returned to the USA again, and set about trapping Evil Ernie, the lover of her enemy Lady Death. In the middle of a battle, she appeared through the blood of Mary Young, with whom she still had a link, and knocked out and kidnapped Chastity, taking her to Los Angeles where she had already recruited The Faithless One — now calling himself The Saviour — to do her work. While The Saviour was setting up Ernie, Purgatori scanned Chastity's mind to find out about her history, and took her to a lesbian bar for purposes of pleasure. Purgatori sensed the Saviour had failed in his plan, and she took Chastity with her, attacking Ernie herself. She got inside his mind and discovered his ability to shape reality, but before she could take action, his Cyber Dead attacked the house and destroyed it, forcing her to flee. Her probing would have disastrous consequences for Ernie. She was in fact, the direct cause of his death.

She travelled to the ruins of New York, seeking the blood of the Fallen Angels. Here she encountered Metatron (named after the angel), and met Blattidae (named after the cockroach), who told her of an ancient Prophecy that detailed her life history and told of her return to Goddesshood. In her battle with Metatron, she began to have doubts about whether she would ever be more than just a common vampire, but after beating him she realised that part of the problem was that she had been wasting her time with lesser creatures like him and should have been aiming higher. She left New York to Blattidae, most of her army having been crucified by Metatron, and began plotting her Ascension.

Travelling to Necropolis, she found it in ruins and was attacked by Rubicante, Rath's brother. Knowing of her abilities he decided to test her, and teleported her to the nightmarish world of Trandaemonium. Beating off an attack by the freaks that inhabited the world, she scented Lady Death here, and tracked her down. Lady Death pretended she didn't want to fight, then used her sword to fight for her — Nightmare swallowed Purgatori, who was well versed in magic and Blood Alchemy and made the sword submit to her will, allowing her to escape. She was ready to fight Lady Death again, but realised that if she didn't leave Transdaemoniium immediately, she never would. Taking the blood energy from Nightmare she left, returning to Earth where a war between the vampire clans was under way.

==== Vampire Clan Wars ====
Having set herself up as the CEO of Isis International, she scoured the planet for artifacts of power. Her first task was to take a team of mercenaries to New York to recover her Prophecy hieroglyphs. The team was attacked by the remains of Metatron's army, but she dealt with them easily. Back in Cairo, her work at Isis International was interrupted by illusions that turned out to be the work of Satrina. An ex-lover of Purgatori's, she returned to seduce her again, and showed her visions of struggles around the world. The message was to teach Purgatori that strength was not enough - she had to believe in herself, as did any army she raised, and that they must be willing to fight for her even if they knew the battle was lost. Satrina left her, secretly hiring a vampire hunter called Karmilla to assassinate Purgatori.

Purgatori watched the vampire war escalate, deciding that Dracula was becoming too powerful for her liking. She was attacked by Karmilla, who had been given various powers by Satrina, but defeated her, trapping her in her dungeon to torture. Karmilla managed to escape but Purgatori deflected her teleportation spell and left her to die in the cold tundra of North America while she traveled to the Invisible Village to find out whether or not it was Rath who had given Karmilla her charmed weapons.

Karmilla followed her, freshly armed with the Spine of Eden, and attacked Rath instead, tricked by Purgatori into thinking he had kidnapped her children. In the ensuing struggle, Purgatori learned that it was Satrina who had betrayed her and was trapped and almost killed by the Spine of Eden, but escaped by turning herself into blood, a sign of her rapidly growing powers. She splattered Karmilla over most of the landscape.

Her next stop was Shanghai, to take down Jade's empire and recover the Chalice of Regeneration. Intercepted in the Sun nightclub, she dispatched her attackers and met up with Dracula who was secretly after the same thing. Together, they assaulted Jade at her fortress home, Purgatori almost killing Jade by shoving her onto a stake. Dracula left her to fight and traveled to get the Chalice himself, enraging Purgatori at having been used. She followed him and was almost killed by Blood Sect vampires who were armed with a new type of bullet lethal to vampires. She bested them and Dracula, recovering the Chalice for her own use. Dracula fled, happy that she had inadvertently helped him - by taking apart Jade's empire, she had strengthened Dracula's position immeasurably in the war.

==== Ordeals with Dracula ====
By now, she had become fed up with Dracula. The final insult came from his name being raised in conversation with a "bimbo" at the Usher club. She teleported to his castle only to find everyone dead. Lured by the only survivor, she was trapped in a furnace and almost incinerated, but managed to escape by taking the blood of the bait and teleporting out.

Weak and without blood to feed on, she found herself in the catacombs under Vatican City, attacked by revenants. She beat them but Dracula moved in, trying to dominate her will. He offered her the use of his army if she would join him but she refused. They fought, and ended up on the roof of the Vatican, both ensnared by the Octarine chains she had found in the Vatican treasure rooms. Dawn was coming up fast, and she was rescued at the last moment by Pope Stephen, who realised that Purgatori was the stronger vampire and stood the best chance of winning the war. She tore out Dracula's fangs, escaping just before the rising sun fried Dracula forever.

==== Satrina and her legacy ====
Purgatori took Satrina back as her lover, finding her treacherous nature arousing, and together they put down a potential uprising by Pope Stephen, who intended to take Purgatori's power. Still unsatisfied, she felt she was no nearer to her goal of goddesshood that she was when she started.

She left for Cairo, to study the Prophecy hieroglyphs at Isis International, and while she was gone Satrina began an invocation ceremony to summon a demon and steal Purgatori's power, killing her to rise as the goddess herself. The spell was corrupted and she raised Gorge instead, who had been watching Purgatori's progress from his home in the Unknown.

Purgatori returned from Cairo, having discovered the betrayal, and killed Satrina, ripping out her heart. Gorge revealed that she was his blood-mother, and he would help her Ascension. Feeling she had to leave the weaknesses of her humanity behind she partially destroyed the Isis International buildings. Gorge showed her that the power of all she had killed was at her disposal. She also saw Rath's creation at the hands of Satrina and suspected that they were still in league. Tracking him to the Serengeti, she killed Rubicante by ripping out his spine, but Rath revealed that he was actually here to help her.

==== Final battles ====
Gorge transported them to the Unknown where she raised an army of dead warriors. Purgatori and her army set off for Asgard on a "training exercise", unaware that Odin was one of her warriors. Her army ravaged Asgard, killing some and converting the rest to her warriors. She defeated Odin and stole his powers. Vandala and Vulnavia fled the carnage, trying to take Frigga to safety, but Purgatori followed them to Transdemoniium, killing Frigga. Vulnavia cut off Purgatori's hand but she regenerated immediately and bit Vulnavia, turning her into a faithful convert. She fought with Matthias, who had been banished here by Lady Death, and took possession of Nightmare. Vandala managed to escape with the help of Brock and Grimmir, leaving to find Lady Death. Purgatori burned Transdemoniium and left for Earth, determined to find and kill Lady Death.

She assaulted Lady Death's fortress in Oblivion, but after a long battle she was stabbed through the heart with the Scythe, degenerating into a pool of blood. Armageddon resurrected her with his power and took her as a servant, ordering her to kill Lady Death. She attacked Lady Death's forces and then sneaked off to attack Armageddon, her plan all along to steal his blood and power. The raw energy and chaotic power in his blood poisoned her, and she collapsed unconscious. Nightmare was taken from her and used to attack Armageddon. He died, but in a final act of defiance unleashed an Uncreation Wave to destroy everything in the cosmos. The effect of the Wave was altered by Mitchell Wardlow, who managed to use it to create eight different parallel universes. Purgatori recovered just in time to be swallowed by the Uncreation Wave.

== Powers and abilities ==
Sakaara of Alexandria is a powerful and dangerous demonic undead creature. A vampire with cambion ancestry, when Rath sired her, she underwent an oddly monstrous transformation: taking on a red succubi-like form, reflecting her fallen heritage. Purgatori is an all powerful demigoddess of strong ability and experience, this added to her hybrid nature makes her several times stronger than either hellborns or vampires. She boasts large amounts of physical conditioning, easily able to rend flesh, toss around cars and bend steel. She is also fast enough to dodge gunfire, catch arrows, and is resilient enough to resist even the most extreme of physical or mystical assaults, be they by man, monster or even that of godlike entities. She can change her physical appearance at will, taking on a human guise or morphing into the shape/form of another person. Her wings also double as weapons, as they are tough external appendages of her own body. She can use them for shielding or razor blades. She can fly at fast speeds to go along with her strength, becoming that much like a wrecking ball while in motion.

Purgatori possesses a regenerative ability comparable to that of Evil Ernie, whose healing is aided by his companion Smiley. She has recovered from injuries ranging from the destruction of her body to complete discorporation, and on one occasion regenerated from a pool of her own blood. This capacity for resurrection is effectively unlimited, provided she maintains a regular intake of fresh blood.

Purgatori is also a practitioner of magic, with a command of the occult that extends to both natural and supernatural forces. Her principal power is Blood Alchemy, which lets her manipulate blood in any form; she describes its basis as "Blood is the life, life travels through blood." Blood Alchemy enhances her vampiric abilities and serves as the catalyst for a range of physical and magical feats, drawing on both her own blood and that of others. She can also use it to teleport over long distances and to encase others in mystic blood armor, which empowers them and binds them to her service as loyal vassals.

She can even use this to animate lifeless object by infusing her blood into them, animating an Egyptian Sphinx in the new universe created after Armageddon to attack an adversary. Likewise she also grows stronger with the intake or reclamation of hers or the blood of others making herself that much stronger than she already is. Purgatori's Blood Alchemy also enables her to emulate and become blood in order to avoid physical assaults, interfere with another's teleportation, create tangible constructs like armor and weapons even portals to other dimensions, etc. The greatest testament to her power would be the assimilation of reality. This allows her to effectively become one with the universe and beyond.

A couple of abilities stemming from outside her mystic craft include pyrokinesis, nature manipulation, pain inducement, teleportation and portal creation. Sakaara is also an adept telepath with a mastery over the mind, be it living or deceased. She can manipulate dead bodies, as well as live minds. She can project the most convincing illusions possible, on top of being able to read minds and view memories. She can shield her own mind and the minds of others from mental intrusion. She is adept at empathy; the art of reading and sensing emotions. Like all vampires in the Chaos! Universe the blood queen can sense the presence of other vampires and supernatural beings, the only exception to this rule is Chastity Marks who is invisible to the paranormal detection capabilities of other undead.

The goddess' most dangerous attribute lies in her ability to gain in power by drinking the blood of others, learning from the undead offspring of a former sire she raised; Purgatori found she has the sum total memories and experiences of every individual being she's drained swirling around inside of her. Through this she realized she not only gained their knowledge but all of their power as well; she found use in this particularly when killing and draining other deities of their life's blood and divine power. To date Purgatori has drained and gained the essence druids learned in the mystic arts, Dracula the vampire king, the Odinforce from its titular named chaos lord who was king of magic and the Norse Gods, a monotheistic entity representing the creator and more.

== Purgatori comic series ==
- Purgatori: The Vampire's Myth (1996)
- Purgatori: The Dracula Gambit (1997)
- Purgatori (monthly series, 1998–1999)
- Purgatori: Goddess Rising (1999)
- Lady Death vs. Purgatori (one shot, 1999)
- Purgatori vs. Vampirella (2000)
- Purgatori: Empire (2000)
- Purgatori Versus Chastity (2000)
- Untold Tales of Purgatori (2000)
- Purgatori vs. Lady Death (2001)
- Purgatori: Love Bites (2001)
- Purgatori: The Hunted (2001)
- Purgatori: Darkest Hour (2001)
- Purgatori: Mischief Night (2001)
- Purgatori: Heartbreaker (2002)
- Purgatori: Re-Imagined (2002)
- Purgatori: God Hunter (2002)
- Purgatori: God Killer (2002 - final series from Chaos! Comics)
- Purgatori: Ravenous (2002 - 999 copies of an Ashcan preview was made available for this issue, but the full issue was never published)

== Reading order ==
- Evil Ernie: Revenge #1-4
- Lady Death: Between Heaven and Hell #1-4
- Chaos Quarterly #1
- Purgatori: The Vampire's Myth #-1, #1-3
- Evil Ernie: Baddest Battles (That Never Happened)
- Purgatori: The Dracula Gambit
- The Omen #1 & 5
- Evil Ernie Monthly (Vampire's Vengeance) #1-3
- The Omen: Vexed
- Purgatori Monthly #1-7
- Lady Death #10
- Chastity Rocked #1-2, & 4
- Smiley: The Psychotic Button #1
- Purgatori: Goddess Rising #1-4
- Armageddon #1-4
- Lady Death vs. Purgatori #1
- Judgement War #2
- Dark Millennium #1
- Purgatori vs. Vampirella
- Purgatori: Empire #1-3
- Purgatori vs. Chastity #1
- Untold Tales of Purgatori #1
- Purgatori 1/2
- Lady Death: Tribulation #1-4
- Purgatori vs. Lady Death #1
- Purgatori: Love Bites #1
- Lady Death: River of Fear #1
- Lady Death: Alive #1
- Purgatori: The Hunted #1-2
- Purgatori: Darkest Hour #1-2
- Purgatori: Mischief Night #1
- Purgatori: Heartbreaker #1
- Purgatori: God Hunter #1-2
- Purgatori: God Killer #1-2
- Purgatori Re-imagined #1
- Dark Alliance #1-3 (#4-5 unpublished)
- Purgatori Ravenous Ashcan

== Character statistics ==
- Purgatori stands 5 ' 10 " (178 cm) to her head – not including her horns – and weighs in at 120 pounds (9 stone 8 pounds, or 54 kilograms).
- Lady Death's original costume was in fact the wedding dress made for Purgatori, given to her by Lucifer himself. Lady Death received it from Cremator after she renounced her humanity and entered Hell.
- Her favourite blood type is that of a god in turmoil.
- The endings for Purgatori vs Chastity were determined by the covers as ALPHA and OMEGA. In Alpha, Purgatori wins. In Omega, Chastity wins.
- Despite her and Chaos! Comics' other best-selling character, Lady Death's, storylines being heavily intertwined, she was not featured at all in Lady Death: The Motion Picture. This was due mainly because Chaos filed bankruptcy and Lady Death's rights were sold to CrossGen Comics while Purgatori was sold with the other Chaos Comics characters.
- Purgatori was featured in the artwork for the album Days of Purgatory by the band Iced Earth.

== See also ==
- Chaos! Comics
- Chastity
- Jade
- Lady Death (her former nemesis)
