= Evil Ernie =

Fictional character

- Evil Ernie

Publication information
- Publisher: Eternity Comics (1991–1992); Chaos! Comics (1994–2002); Devil's Due Publishing (2002–2005); Dynamite Entertainment (2010–present)
- First appearance: Evil Ernie #1 (Eternity Comics, December 1991)
- Created by: Brian Pulido; Steven Hughes

In-story information
- Alter ego: Ernest Fairchild
- Team affiliations: Smiley the Psychotic Button
- Notable aliases: The Evil One; Ernesto; Herald of Megadeath; Lady Death's Lover
- Abilities: Telepathy, near-limitless regenerative ability, superhuman strength, ability to animate and control dead bodies, manipulation of arcane energy, future art illustration, mindscape materialization

Evil Ernie, an undead psychotic killer, is a supervillain created by writer Brian Pulido and artist Steven Hughes in 1991 and originally published by Eternity Comics. The imprint shifted hands in 1993 to Chaos! Comics and then Devil's Due Publishing in 2005. Evil Ernie is currently published by Dynamite Entertainment, which purchased the Chaos! Comics imprint.

== Ernest Fairchild ==
Ernest Fairchild is the root or core of Evil Ernie. Ernest Fairchild was a young boy who possessed the supernatural power to sketch scenes which would later come to pass, for instance he drew himself and his family together with a little brother and several months later his mom became pregnant with their second son. Ernie originally had an enjoyable life, but when his father became the town pariah because his superiors at the local lumber yard forced him to lay off many workers, things started to turn sour. Mr. Fairchild began to drink heavily and killed Ernest's pet rat, Smiley, in an inebriated fit of anger. This enraged Ernest and led to him drawing a picture of a car crashing into a tree. It happened that his mother was driving over to a local bar to pick up her husband while he was drawing this and ended up crashing into a tree just like in Ernest's sketch. In addition to suffering numerous injuries, she had a miscarriage which caused her to slip into an abusive psychosis matching that of her husband.

As his parents abused him, Ernest's powers developed further to where he could hear the thoughts of those around him and he discovered that many of his neighbors knew that he was being battered by his parents, but did nothing to help him. Either they had lost their jobs at the lumber yard and were too bitter to care or they still had their jobs, but were too afraid of losing them if they confronted his father.

Ernest's parents sought to "cure" him of his abilities and brought him to Dr. Leonard Price, who had been working on a device dubbed the Dream Probe. Price, not knowing about the abuse Ernest was suffering, submitted him to his device, which sent him to the Endless Graveyard, where he met Lady Death. There, she offered to give him the love he so desperately desired if he killed everything on Earth. Once the treatment was over, Ernest pretended to be cured and went home with his parents, only to murder them the next morning along with thirty-five others before he was shot by Doctor Price, who had come to check in on him.

After this time he was incarcerated in a mental asylum, under the observation of Doctor Price, who blamed himself for Ernest's murder spree and vowed to make sure it never happened again. Doctor Price lost hope for Fairchild early on, but then a doctor named Mary Young invented a process of altering one's mind known as Neurotech. Despite Price's protests, Ernest was submitted to the Neurotech device. During the treatment, Lady Death used her telepathic link with him to cause the machine to explode, killing Ernest. When a nurse placed a smiley face pin intended to be a gift upon his release next to his corpse, Lady Death used it as a conduit for her arcane energy, mutating Ernest into the powerful, undead monster that would be known as Evil Ernie.

== "Evil" Ernie Fairchild ==
Evil Ernie hereafter, along with his partner "Smiley" (a psychotic smiley badge, which was once his pet rat) set about to cause "Megadeath", which involved launching all of the USA's nuclear weapons against the rest of the world, so that every other country would launch their own nuclear warheads. Ernie starts to accomplish this by creating an army of zombies known as "Dead Onez". Various adventures ensue, including a trip back to his past to confront his parents about their ill treatment of him, and a trip to hell to rebuke Pagan (the court jester of hell) for having Lady Death cast out into the void by Satan.

The culmination of Ernie's efforts amount to him causing Megadeath by causing the rest of the world to fire on itself with nuclear warheads from various countries. Evil Ernie ends his life in a duel with Dr. Price, and in the last moment before the missiles hit, Ernie overpowers Price and mutates him into a Dead One, exclaiming: "Do you see it now?", to which Price replies "I see it, it's beau-". The final scene is one of a mushroom cloud behind the survivors, in the form of Ernie's face and maniacal grin.

== Hack/Slash and Santa Fe ==
After his death in his own world, Ernie would be reborn in the universe of Tim Seeley's Hack/Slash (in which no equivalent of him appears to exist). Discovering that Lady Death does not exist in this world, a depressed Ernie takes up residence in the Fairchild Sawmill in New Jersey and begins killing strippers and mutating them into Dead Onez. Ernie would eventually encounter slasher-slayer Cassie Hack and her partner Vlad, in the ensuing battle read Cassie's mind and fell in love with her, believing them to be two sides of the same coin. After Cassie is saved from him by Vlad, Ernie, wanting to impress Cassie, decides to purge the world of killers and breaks into the Clearview Mental Institution, planning to start his mission there. During his killing spree, Ernie is confronted by Cassie and Vlad and, while fighting the latter, is attacked by a recently arrived police officer. Killing the officer, Ernie discovers Cassie had accidentally been shot and, after she dies, Ernie sacrifices himself to revive her, causing him to die and be reborn elsewhere.

After the Hack/Slash crossover, the renewed license gained new life in the 4-issue mini-series Evil Ernie in Santa Fe. Written by Alan Grant and penciled by Tommy Castillo, it featured Ernie in Santa Fe contemplating matters of fate after killing Norman Lowell, a lawyer who led Ernie against a demonic cult performing rituals with connections to FastWay, a fast food franchise, while planning to sacrifice a child to demon Zabudel who granted wealth to their leader. All the while Ernie is chased by Dr. Price's daughter Layna who wants revenge partnered with detective Rig Dannon who's willing to catch Ernie for the million-dollar reward.

== Smiley ==
In the series, Ernie's companion is Smiley, a talking smiley face button usually pinned to his jacket's lapel. Smiley serves as the conduit for the arcane energy that gives Ernie his powers, and provides comic relief. Smiley describes himself as Ernie's super-ego and is sometimes disagrees with Ernie's decisions, such as when Ernie resurrected his parents to confront them about their past. Smiley is believed to be the revived form of Ernest's pet rat which his father killed in a fit of rage, but for the most part however, his personality is more easy-going and comical than Ernie's.

=== Chaos! Dynamite revamp ===
Smiley resumes the role of Ernest Fairchild, revived as Evil Ernie's companion. He is now taking on actively participating in the mayhem caused by his companion. While supplying his host with arcane energy, Smiley is a possessing entity who can move freely and attack others using his opposable mandibles. He can possess people by attaching herewith himself to them and controlling their actions. Smiley was once a struggling restaurant owner-turned business tycoon named Richard Smiley, secretly working for the devil and representative Chaos Lord named Lucifer, who condemned his soul to be bound forever to his symbolism of power, Richard's smiley-faced buttons, when the former became a threat to the king of hell's seat of power.

== Powers and abilities ==
As Ernest Fairchild, he had the ability to sketch drawings of the future. This was first demonstrated when he drew a picture of a brand-new washing machine being delivered shortly before one was delivered to his parents as a prize in a raffle they had not even entered. It seems that his ability could change the future since he once drew a picture of a future younger brother walking with him, when he heard his mother tell his father she was pregnant with a boy, only to prevent his younger brother from being born when he drew his mother's car crashing into a tree. Later on, he gained the ability to listen to the thoughts of others. As Evil Ernie, he was extremely strong and practically unstoppable, thanks to the arcane energy of Lady Death powering him. He could revive anyone he killed or were killed by his minions as loyal zombie followers in his army of undead. When resurrected in Washington D.C., he became even more powerful. He could now resurrect the corpses of anyone nearby, whether he had killed them or not, and could manipulate arcane energy into powerful blasts to destroy his enemies, though he rarely used this ability since he preferred to be more "hands on" when it came to killing. If Ernest were to ever die he can be resurrected through another person when his Smiley button jabs them on his pin, but only once upon the host individual's death as Evil can only control the dead not the living.

He retained his telepathic abilities only to a small degree as they now worked specifically on the dead and few things related to the dead, which allowed him to speak to and see Lady Death after murdering someone or using astral projection to visit Hell or the Endless Graveyard while he slept. There is room for speculation on this however, as Purgatori once delved into his mind to find answers to a means of defeating his patron saint and lover, Lady Death. She found the nightmarish images within his psyche were not figments of his imagining but were in fact materialized ghouls which threatened to devour her implicating he had some kind of power to will whatever he wished into reality. Later still when Evil was separated from a still-living Ernest Fairchild as a Jungian archetype fission effect after having discovered the truth from the reanimated remains of his parents while returning home, Ernie regained his ability to read the minds of the living when resuscitated from the painful separation of his better half, openly peering into the minds of three living youths who resurrected him in order to learn their life stories. The source of Evil Ernie's power comes from the arcane energy channeled into him by Lady Death through his button, Smiley. If Ernie is separated from Smiley for too long, he begins to lose his power becoming much weaker and over time he will, eventually, revert to a corpse and die again leaving Smiley an inanimate badge as well.

In the revamp of the Evil mythos, Ernest's powers remain much the same but a tad more refined. Still boasting the strength, toughness, recuperation, necromancy and arcane energy manipulation abilities retained as previous issues only using them to a much more mystical effect than just as blunt instruments; if he wishes Ernie can resume his initial living form before he was executed and can physically substitute removed limbs to replace any extremities he may have lost. He is much more liberal in the destructive/concussive effects of his energies using it for hand blasts, releasing it in AoE explosions, etc. On the physical side he can withhold it to increase his physical melee as energy enhanced strikes and can also remotely control any parts of his body to act on his behalf, he also has the innate psychic ability to peer into a person's moral alignment just as soon as he would look at them. In his eyes people appear to Ernie as differently as individual snowflakes; the corrupt appearing hellish and demonic with the particular sins they committed tattooed to their face or forehead, while the innocent retain a human appearance brandishing a smiley button like he does with a ray of light looming over them. It is also suggested that he is, on top of being human, a being of both angelic and demonic descent by another chaos lord: Mistress Hel.

== Reboot ==
In October 2012, Dynamite Entertainment rebooted Evil Ernie in a 6-issue series written by Jesse Blaze Snider and drawn by Jason Craig. Two years later Dynamite released volume 2, which was six issues, written by Tim Seeley & Steve Seeley and drawn by Rafael Lanhellas. Another reboot was on the way due to the 30th anniversary of Chaos characters.

=== Origin of Evil ===
In the newest serialization, Ernest Fairchild was a child born from tragedy. The soon-to-be youngest son in a family of four, and as his mother went into labor a malicious entity possessed his father while they were driving her to the hospital killing everybody from his mother, father to older brother in a hideous car accident; the being later is revealed to be Ernest's future compatriot Smiley. He would later be adopted to an abusive parental figure by the name of Bufford King, who would regularly accost him while his callous girlfriend, Eunice, never bothered to help him. For many years this was the making of Ernie's horrid life usually ending with him praying to Nicolas Cage and Jesus every night; first for salvation of his new caretakers, then deliverance from their unsympathetic brutality, next to punishing them for the rot in their souls until finally he found a new patron to pray to seeing as neither were listening.

During his stay in the prison and before he became an inmate Ernest had the peculiar tendency of seeing the innermost aspects of a person's core being. He could see the morality of another's character often viewing both the good and evil people around him in a different light. Five years prior Fairchild had made a bargain with one of the many chaos lords in charge of running the dark side of the universe named Satan. In exchange for the power to purge the world of sinners he would sacrifice a good number of condemned souls. He poisoned the town's water supply with arsenic in a ritualistic killing, intoxicating them all moments before he would run over the-then imprisoned Bufford's girlfriend with her own truck, unintentional but his first step to being remade, making his way to the 'Widmark Maximum Security Prison' to see his cruel foster father, his final sacrifice. Upon meeting he proceeded to attack King with a shard of glass permanently disfiguring him.

A few years later, Ernie is now a death row inmate at the same penitentiary awaiting execution by electric chair for murders described by the local media as The Lucrecia Massacre of 2006. Those attending included newscasters to protesters, to witness the execution. All coming in accordance to this execution, with him requesting he go out with his trademark leather jacket and infamous smiley-faced button as a last request. Attending witnesses to his final moments is his father figure who was let in by the corrupt prison warden named Straw. As well as his only friends, Doctor Thana Thomas and a pastor named Chaplain. On the night of execution however, Ernest was reanimated by a storm of green magical energy which entered his cadaver bursting forth from his bowels. It burned his facial features into a lipless smile while his ordinarily inert yellow button suddenly sprang to life sporting a scowling facial expression and a toothy grin. Thus the jailbird-turned deadman had been revived as the devil's soul harbinger "Evil Ernie".

Seeking to finish off the ritual and his vendetta towards his estranged foster parent, Evil Ernie escaped the execution chamber and led a homicidal tirade against both the prisoners and the facility staff along with any other unfortunate sinner who happened to catch his vengeful eye. Experimenting with his newfound powers he tears through the penal area slaughtering sinners while also sparing the few good individuals he came upon along the way, he would soon find however that reckless expenditure of his arcane energy which animates his corpse weakens him due to his having yet to complete his end of the devil's deal. Due to this weakness he is eventually subdued and hideously maimed by his guardian leading the other inmates, but Smiley tricks Bufford into a new deal which costs him his right arm causing him to flee with the innocent doctor in tow.

Meanwhile, outside the prisons borders a U.S. senator catches glimpses of Ernie's rampage at the prison after concluding business with a prostitute. Utterly horrified by this turn of events he orders a gathering of military powers at the Pentagon, then moves to the White House speaking with the President of the United States convincing him that the threat of the now-demonic revenant required the nuclear option. Back at the prison Ernest is beset twice by Uriel the archangel of destiny to try and dissuade him from his murderous recourse, but every time however they were dispatched either by Smiley who was hot-wiring a nearby corpse due to his allegiances to hell and not wanting Ernie to know the truth, and again by Bufford who had attached a severed arm of Fairchild's to himself gaining a portion of his undead son's demonic powers. After having been made vulnerable by Smiley getting damaged by a stray bullet Ernie is soon killed by Bufford as he loses his connection to the arcane energy while trying to defend the host of innocent prisoners possessed by Uriel's followers, but Ernest is again resurrected with even greater power than before by an unknown force and follows up by reanimating an army of dead prisoners and bystanders who were at the prison to face his now-demonized foster father. Still losing the fight against him as the evil power worked better than the kinder zombie kid, Evil managed to pull a Hail Mary by taking control of the arm Bufford severed making him rip out and eat his own heart.

Having managed to save Thana, Ernie is unaware that a nuke is dropped over the prison the two are currently occupying. Unbeknownst to him the President had been possessed by Uriel who greenlit the bombing through his proxy. Ernest is soon revived by Smiley but his only friend is incinerated in the blast, cursing Nicolas Cage just as everything was over; Ernie resigns to his fate as the devil's bounty hunter as he picks up Bufford's hat for himself and sets out to parts unknown.

=== Chaos! Highway to Hell ===
While out on a job acting as hitman in the Dakotas, Ernie had a premonition about a dark enchantress whom he'd often have visions of whenever he slept or was awake killing other sinners, ignoring Smiley's pleas of worry Ernest set about finding people affiliated with murder so he could discover the secrets to these odd visions of his. Soon making his way to a highway near Kansas State, he senses a newest mark, Ethan Mueller, who was a wanted murderer and was shot dead before he could receive any insight from his mystery woman. Sensing whoever he is searching for is somehow linked in some way to death Ernie sets his sights on finding people who broadcast an insensibly high body count.

Every step of the way he is either met with or pursued by various forces seeking to impede his progress, such as Chastity Marks and Morgan Gallows, along with his Chosen. In the meantime Fairchild headed into the titular city in order to greet and make deceased, the man who put Widmark Penitentiary on the map. Disguised as a pizza delivery boy, Ernest would make his presence known to Lt. Brandon Green while getting into an altercation with his manipulative advisor: Senator Cruise. After finally having whacked his repentant nuke carrier Ernie gains the full picture of who it is that's been guiding him, and is revealed to be Mistress Hel, Nordic Goddess of death and the Asgardian underworld. She convinces The Evil One that his employer had been cheating him the entire time, having used Ernie's vigilante crusade against sinners in his own favor in order to swell his ranks in hell and will eventually claim Ernie as his ultimate General. Hel convinces him to lead the initiation of Ragnarok by bringing about a mass exodus of dead souls; basically compelling him to incite Megadeath, in doing so both he and she will make a paradise after conflict at the end of days destroying everything.

After letting loose a huge blast of his arcane energy, Ernie levels the housing area where the press had gathered to meet the good lieutenant eviscerating everybody. As Mistress Hel makes her preparations through her ward Serendipity, Ernest leaves his former partner Smiley before getting into a fight with Chastity who quickly gains the upper hand in their conflict. Until Evil Ernie conjures up some of his Dead Onez to restrain her where he deals a critical blow with her own silver sword, as the nubile vampiress makes her escape Ernest quickly catches up to her in a semi-abandoned alley.

He ends up overhearing her feelings of lingering regrets about how Chastity's love for someone put him in the crosshairs of Sakaara when her oldest enemy put out a contract on her. Seeing her depth of character reflected through action and persona Ernie offers her a chance to side with him against her current handler. She complies as the two devise a clever means of royally punking the whore of Satan, Ernie using his arcane energy to hotwire the mind of one of Purgatori's renfield's piloting the transport with which Chastity took to catch up with Evil Ernie right into her Las Vegas penthouse. Making their way to the Clearview Mental Institution in St. Louise, Missouri, Ernie and Chastity wade through an enclave of the morbidly self-destructive gathered in front of the psychiatric clinic by Hel's influence.

There he and his new partner meet up with Serendipity and Dr. Leonard Price moments before Ernie hooks himself into the professor's dream probe machine which instead of curbing fatalistic depression tendencies, aggravates them into full-on suicidal urges. Using this device to amplify his natural psionic abilities The Evil One projects his telepathy across the globe drudging up people's most horrible characteristics and showing those to them. Sending all of the people both innocent and guilty into a mélange binge sparking a wholesale self-murder in every corner around cities, countries, the globe etc. As The Chosen aligned with the blood mother to make their way into the fray, all the dead suicidal people rise from their grave to engage them. Bit by bit as people from the world start killing themselves one after the other, Ernie begins to burn himself out as the overexpenditure of his energies without Smiley to sustain and refuel him, steadily being reduced to an inanimate corpse because of this. Ernest is met by the women who'd orchestrated the events of Armageddon who use the body of Sara as a vessel to commune with her champion and consort. Her attentions are otherwise preoccupied by the arrival of another Æsir. While Hel is distracted by Purgatori, Vex is revealed as Niorun, Goddess of the Night, and moves to soothe Evil Ernie's psi-induced rampage by feeding him loving happy memories of what he truly desired.

Only to be interrupted by Purgatori as she moves to use the device in order to conquer the world, Chastity takes Smiley and tosses him up to the window where Ernie and Purgatori sit just as she uses the probe to broadcast her own psychic mojo to the world and enthralls everyone. After the demon button re-energizes Ernie the latter uses his energy to call down a massive blast which obliterates both him and Purgatori along with the entire building complex sending them both back to hell in a blaze. In the aftermath all that can be seen left of him is the now-inert Smiley picked up by a hazmat team studying the ruined site of his climactic battle.

== Publishing history ==
Eternity Comics

Evil Ernie #1–5 (1991)

Adventure Comics

Evil Ernie: Special Limited Edition #1 (1992)

Chaos! Comics

Evil Ernie: Youth Gone Wild #1–5 (1996)

Evil Ernie: Resurrection #1–4 (1993)

Evil Ernie #0 (1993)

Evil Ernie: Revenge #1–4 (1994)

Evil Ernie Vs. Superheroes (1995)

Evil Ernie: Straight to Hell Prologue (published by Wizard) (1995)

Evil Ernie: Straight to Hell #1–5 (1995–1996)

Evil Ernie #1/2 (published by Wizard) (1997)

Evil Ernie Vs. Movie Monster (1997)

Evil Ernie: Destroyer #1-9 (1997–1998)

Evil Ernie Vs. Superheroes II (1998)

Evil Ernie: Monthly #1-10 (1998–1999)

Evil Ernie: Depraved #1–3 (1999)

Evil Ernie: War of the Dead #1–3 (1999)

Armageddon (preview) (1999)

Armageddon #1-4 (1999–2000)

Evil Ernie: Pieces of Me #1 (2000)

Evil Ernie: The Return #1 (2001)

Evil Ernie: Relentless (2002)

Devil's Due Publishing

Evil Ernie: In Santa Fe #1–4 (2005)

Hack/Slash: The Final Revenge of Evil Ernie (2005)

Dynamite

Evil Ernie: Origin of Evil #1–6 (2012)

Li'l Ernie (2013)

Chaos! #1-6 (2014)

Chaos! Holiday Special #1 (2014)

Evil Ernie: Suicide King #1–6 (2014–2015)

Chaos! Smiley the Psychotic Button (2015)

Alice Cooper Vs. Chaos! #1–6 (2016)

Evil Ernie: Godeater #1–5 (2016)

Evil Ernie #1–6 (2021–2022)

== Additional information ==
Prior to her sale to CrossGen (and then Avatar Press), Lady Death was Ernie's lover. In later series Lady Hel who was made to replace Lady Death was his lover alongside Chastity.

== See also ==
- List of Devil's Due Publishing publications
