= Lady Death: The Motion Picture =

- Promotional poster for Lady Death
- Directed by: Andy Orjuela
- Screenplay by: Carl Macek
- Story by: Brian Pulido
- Based on: Lady Death by: Chaos! Comics
- Produced by: Andy Orjuela
- Starring: Christine Auten
- Music by: Bill Brown
- Production companies: A.D. Vision; Sunmin Image Pictures
- Distributed by: ADV Films
- Release date: July 24, 2004
- Running time: 80 minutes
- Country: United States
- Language: English

Lady Death: The Motion Picture is a 2004 American adult animated fantasy action film based on the comic book character Lady Death. This film was the first animation project produced by now-defunct anime distributor A.D. Vision. It had premiered at the 2004 Comic-Con convention. The film was released on DVD October 5, 2004, and had been aired on A.D. Vision's Anime Network. A Blu-ray edition of the film was released by AEsir Holdings and Section23 Films on September 20, 2011.

== Plot ==
The film begins in 15th century Sweden. Hope, the beautiful and innocent daughter of Matthias (a skilled mercenary who is in actuality Lucifer himself), is accused of being the Devil's consort. Hope is sentenced by the town priest to be burned at the stake. Matthias, through a proxy, offers her life if she surrenders herself to him and joins him in Hell. At first she agrees to his terms, but Matthias's plan to corrupt her is soon met with unanticipated resistance, as Hope rejects his scheme and eventually finds herself transformed into the powerful warrior Lady Death, who challenges Lucifer for control of Hell itself.

== Cast ==
- Christine Auten as Lady Death/Hope
- Mike Kleinhenz as Lucifer/Matthias
- Andy McAvin as Pagan
- Rob Mungle as Cremator
- Mike MacRae as Asmodeus, Large Torture Troll
- Chris Patton as Niccolo
- Dwight Clark as Father Orbec
- Maureen McCullough as Marion
- Ted Pfister as Elderly Man
- Marcy Rae as Elderly Woman
- Greg Ayres as Young Man
- Jason Douglas as Matthias Guards, Stable Demons
- Ben Pronsky as Matthias Guards
- John Swasey as General Ahriman, Torture Guards, Demon Priest
- James Faulkner as General Utuk Xul
- Laura Butcher as Lucifer's Concubines
- Marizol Cabrera-Ojeda as Lucifer's Concubines
- Shelley Calene-Black as Lucifer's Concubines
- Geana Lewis as Lucifer's Concubines
- Mary Marquez as Lucifer's Concubines
- Adam Conlon as Small Tortue Troll

== Production ==
In December 1999, Chaos! Comics entered an agreement with A.D. Vision to produce a direct-to-video animated film based on Brian Pulido's Lady Death. Early in production, the film was going under the title Lady Death: Revelations in Black. Pulido served as an associate producer and wrote the film's screenplay while retaining creative control. In February 2001, it was reported that the film was slowly progressing as the producers reviewed the storyboards from the Japanese animation studio Phoenix Entertainment who had previously collaborated with A.D. Vision on Sin: The Movie. Despite the prospect of missing its original intended Halloween 2001 release date, the producers were reportedly optimistic as they had increased the film's budget by securing additional funding and were also looking to supplement the film's planned direct-to-video release with a premiere on cable television.

In January 2002, it was reported that A.D. Vision would be partnering with Korean animation studio Sunmin Image Pictures to produce the film under the supervision of the film's writer Carl Macek and director Andy Orjuela with production estimated to take one year to complete. That same month however, there were also reports that others would direct the film such as South Korean animator Young H. Sang or possibly Macek himself.

The film was announced to be produced in an all-digital 'paperless' environment. Sunmin Image Pictures had previously done work on Batman: The Animated Series, Gargoyles, and The Maxx. While Lady Death: The Motion Picture was identified in industry trades as A.D. Vision's "first foray into original, feature-length productions", the company had previously produced Sin: The Movie in 2000. In March 2003, it was reported the film was in the process of being digitally animated with the producers targeting a late 2003 release date. The producers deliberately chose to avoid animating the film in an "anime" style in order to increase the broad appeal of the film. By this point in production, Lady Death's creator Brian Pulido had been completely locked out of the production process causing him to sour on the project and alleged that A.D. Vision executives were refusing to even speak with him, though he was still credited as an executive producer on the final film.

== Release ==
Lady Death - The Motion Picture was released on DVD and VHS on October 5, 2004 at a list price of $29.98. The film also premiered on the Anime Network after they had expanded from a video on demand to a 24/7 linear service.

== Reception ==
Mike Dungan of Mania.com (then known as AnimeOnDvd.com) gave the film a C. Dungan states that the script limits the appeal of the film, but the animation and acting were generally praised.
