= Nyx (comics) =

Nyx, in comics, may refer to:

- Nyx (Image Comics), a character of the Spawn comic book series
- NYX (comics), a Marvel Comics limited series
- Nyx (Marvel Comics), a Marvel Comics supervillain

== See also ==
- NYX (disambiguation)
