= Bad Kitty (comics) =

Comic book series

Bad Kitty is a superheroine that appears in comic books published by Chaos! Comics. Bad Kitty was one of several staple Chaos characters that capitalized on the so-called bad girl genre.

== Fictional character biography ==
New Orleans law enforcer Catherine Bell was one of a rare breed - a truly honest cop. Eventually the inevitable happened when what should have been a routine case brought her into conflict with the corruption within her own police force. It also confronted her with the realities of voodoo when her lover was transformed into a zombie and sent to kill her.

Enraged, Catherine gave up the force and, using a lot of high-caliber weapons, expressed her disapproval of those responsible for wrecking her life. They ended up dead, and she ended up on the FBI's Most Wanted list. Now using the alias Bad Kitty and accompanied by her black cat, Lucky, she continues to confront the supernatural and tries to survive.

== Legacy ==
Bad Kitty, as well as all other titles published by Chaos! Comics ended when Chaos declared bankruptcy in 2002. All of the Chaos properties, with the exception of Lady Death, were later bought by Tales of Wonder.

As of 2010, Dynamite Entertainment owns the rights to most of the Chaos Comics characters, including Bad Kitty. Dynamite relaunched Bad Kitty in October 2010 with a new one-shot written by J. C. Spence and illustrated by Rafael Carlos.

== Series ==
- Bad Kitty
- Bad Kitty: Reloaded
- Lady Death/Bad Kitty/Chastity: United (one shot)
- Bad Kitty: Mischief Night
- Lady Death/Bad Kitty (one shot)
- Chaos! Bad Kitty (one-shot) (2014)
- Red Sonja: Age of Chaos #1-6
