= Devil's Due Publishing =

Comic book publisher

- Founded: 1999; 27 years ago
- Founder: Joshua Blaylock
- Country of origin: United States
- Headquarters location: Chicago, Illinois
- Distribution: Simon & Schuster (books)
- Key people: Joshua Blaylock, CEO
- Publication types: Comic books
- Official website: www.devilsdue.net

Devil's Due Publishing (often abbreviated as DDP) is an independent comic book publisher in the United States. Based in Chicago, Illinois, DDP is best known for its wide selection of genres, including licensed and original creator-owned properties which populate its monthly comic book series and graphic novels.

Though principally a publishing company, DDP has also produced a stage play based on the Hack/Slash comic series, Stagefright, in conjunction with the New Millennium Theatre Company that played at the National Pastime Theater in Chicago from September 23 to October 29, 2005.

== History ==
In 1998 Devil's Due Publishing started as both a commercial art studio and a small press comic-book publisher. The company soon shifted its focus to comic books, becoming one of the top ten publishers in North America.

In 2004 Pat Broderick revived Micronauts at Devil's Due, although the title was cancelled after ten issues.

DDP produced an American comic book version of Vampire Hunter D. It was written by Jimmy Palmiotti and titled American Wasteland. Devil's Due also republished Je suis légion by Fabien Nury and John Cassaday as an eight-issue miniseries, I Am Legion, as part of a larger deal to reprint work with Humanoids Publishing, including titles like The Zombies That Ate The World.

Devil's Due restructured itself in December 2008, including changes in editors, marketing managers, and a new CEO.

In 2009, Devil's Due was accused of not paying several creative teams. In an article on the website Bleeding Cool, Rich Johnston wrote to the company's CEO, Joshua Blaylock, and reported that only Tim Seeley had gone unpaid.

DDP is represented in Hollywood by Alter Ego Entertainment and Prime Universe, who share a first-look deal with the publisher for film, television and video games. Currently the three parties are in discussion with numerous studios about expanding Devil's Due properties into other media.

In 2010, DDP and Checker Book Publishing Group (owned and operated by Mark Thompson) opened Devil's Due Digital; a solely digital comic book and graphic novel distribution company.

On June 16, 2015, Devil’s Due Entertainment announced plans to merge with First Comics.

== Comic series ==
=== Published with other companies ===
Chaos! Comics

- Evil Ernie #1–4
- Purgatori #1–6

Dabel Bros.

- Hedge Knight #1–6

eigoMANGA

- Rumble Pak

Kinetic Komicz

- killer7 #½–4

Monkey Pharmacy

- Elsinore #4, 5
- Elsinore: Psycho Sanctii (unreleased)

Studio Ice

- Megacity 909 #1–8
- Mu #1–4

Udon

- Capcom Summer Special 2004
- Darkstalkers #1–5
- Street Fighter #1–14

Urban Robot

- Lo-Fi Magazine #1, 3
- Lo-Fi Magazine Vol. 2 #4–7

== See also ==
- Chaos! Comics
