= Chaos! Comics =

Defunct American comic book publisher

- Industry: Comics
- Genre: Horror
- Founded: 1993; 33 years ago
- Defunct: 2002; 24 years ago
- Headquarters: Scottsdale, Arizona
- Key people: Brian Pulido
- Owner: Dynamite Entertainment
- Website: www.chaoscomics.com

Chaos! Comics is a former comic book publisher and currently a brand from Dynamite Entertainment. The original incarnation of Chaos! operated from 1993 until 2002, mostly focusing on horror comics. Titles from the publisher include Lady Death, Purgatori, Evil Ernie, Chastity, Jade, Bad Kitty, and Lady Demon. Original Chaos! creators included Brian Pulido, Steven Hughes, Al Rio, Mike Flippin, Justiniano, and Hart D. Fisher. Chaos! also published licensed comics for the World Wrestling Federation (WWF, now WWE) and several bands.

Following bankruptcy, the properties changed hands several time, until landing at Dynamite Entertainment, where the name was revived as an imprint for the associated characters.

== History ==
Chaos was founded in 1993 in Scottsdale, Arizona, and published its first title that same year. Writer Brian Pulido was the company's president.

The company dealt with a copyright infringement accusation in 1997, when horror writer Nancy A. Collins claimed that the character and storyline of Chastity were based on her character Sonja Blue.

Chaos Comics filed bankruptcy in late 2002, with all characters (save Lady Death) being sold off to comic retailer Tales of Wonder, who sold the rights to Devil's Due Publishing. After the demise of Devil's Due Publishing, the rights to the Chaos! Comics characters went to Dynamite Entertainment.

Prior to the bankruptcy, rights to Lady Death were sold to CrossGen Entertainment, and prior to CrossGen's bankruptcy, those rights were sold to Brian Pulido and Avatar Press, who founded the imprint Boundless Comics solely for Lady Death-comics.

Due to Lady Death not being part of the sale, Dynamite created Lady Hel to replace her. Lady Hel received her own comic series in 2022.

== List of Chaos! Comics titles ==
=== A ===
- Aftermath #1 (Feb 2000)
- Armageddon! #1–4 (Oct 1999 – Jan 2000)

=== B ===
- Bad Kitty #1–3 (Feb – Mar 2001)
- Bad Kitty: Mischief Night #1 (Nov 2001)
- Bad Kitty: Reloaded #1–4 (Oct 2001 – Feb 2002)
- Bedlam #1 (Sep 2000)
- Brinke of Eternity #1 (Apr 1994)

=== C ===
- Chaos! Bible #1 (Nov 1995)
- Chaos! Chronicles (Feb 2000)
- Chaos! Gallery #1 (Aug 1997)
- Chaos! Quarterly #1–3 (Oct 1995 – May 1996)
- Chastity #½ (Jan 2001)
- Chastity: Crazytown #1–3 (Apr 2002 – Jun 2002)
- Chastity: Heartbreaker #1 (Mar 2002)
- Chastity: Love Bites #1 (Mar 2001)
- Chastity: Lust for Life #1–3 (May – Jul 1999)
- Chastity: Re-Imagined #1 (Jul 2002)
- Chastity: Reign of Terror #1 (Oct 2000)
- Chastity: Rocked #1–4 (Nov 1998 – Feb 1999)
- Chastity: Shattered #1–3 (Jun – Sep 2001)
- Chastity: Special Sketchbook Edition (May 1997)
- Chastity: Theatre of Pain #1–3 (Feb – Jun 1997)
- Chyna #1 (Sep 2000)
  - Chyna II #1 (Jul 2001)
- Cremator #1–5 (Dec 1998 – May 1999)
- Cryptic Writings of Megadeth #1–4 (Sep 1997 – Jun 1998)

=== D ===
- Dead King #1–4 (May – Aug 1998)
- Deep Black #1 (1997)
- Detonator #1–2 (Dec 1994 – Jan 1995)

=== E ===
- Evil Ernie #1–10 (Jul 1998 – Apr 1999); #½ (Oct 1997)
- Evil Ernie: Baddest Battles (That Never Happened!) #1 (Jan 1997)
- Evil Ernie: Depraved #1–3 (Jul – Sep 1999)
- Evil Ernie: Destroyer #1–9 (Oct 1997 – Jun 1998)
- Evil Ernie: Pieces of Me #1 (Nov 2000)
- Evil Ernie: Relentless #1 (May 2002)
- Evil Ernie: Revenge! #1–4 (Oct 1994 – Feb 1995)
- Evil Ernie: Straight to Hell #1–5 (Oct 1995 – May 1996)
- Evil Ernie: The Resurrection #1–4 (Jul – Oct 1993)
- Evil Ernie: Youth Gone Wild! – Director's Cut #1 (Oct 1995)
- Evil Ernie: Youth Gone Wild – Encore Presentation #1 (Nov 1996 – Mar 1997)
- Evil Ernie Returns #1 (Oct 2001)
- Evil Ernie vs. The Movie Monsters! #1 (Mar 1997)
- Evil Ernie vs. The Superheroes #1 (Aug 1995)
- Evil Ernie vs. The Superheroes 2 (Sep 1998)
- Evil Ernie: War of the Dead #1–3 (Nov 1999 – Jan 2000)

=== H ===
- Halloween #1 (Nov 2000)
  - Halloween II: The Blackest Eyes #1 (Apr 2001)
  - Halloween III: The Devil's Eyes #1 (Nov 2001)
- The Haunted #1–4 (Jan – Apr 2002)
- The Haunted: Gray Matters #1 (Jul 2002)
- Homicide: Tears of the Dead #1 (Apr 1997)

=== I ===
- Insane Clown Posse: Hallowicked #1 (Nov 2001)
- Insane Clown Posse: Halls of Illusion #1 (Jun 2002)
- Insane Clown Posse: Raze the Desertz of Glass #1 (Nov 1999)
- Insane Clown Posse: The Amazing Jeckel Brothers #1 (Sep 1999)
- Insane Clown Posse: The Pendulum (Jan 2000 – Dec 2001)
- Insane Clown Posse: The Upz & Downz of the Wicked Clownz #1 (Jun 1999)

=== J ===
- Jade #1–4 (May – Aug 2001)
- Jade: Redemption #1–4 (Dec 2001 – Mar 2002)

=== L ===
- Lady Death vol. 1, #1–3 (Jan – Mar 1994); #½ (Dec 1994)
  - Lady Death vol. 2, #0–16 (Nov 1997 – May 1999)
- Lady Death: Alive #1–4 (May – Aug 2001)
- Lady Death: Between Heaven and Hell #1–4 (Mar – Jun 1995)
- Lady Death: Dark Alliance #1–3 (Jul – Aug 2002)
- Lady Death: Dark Millennium #1–3 (Feb – Apr2000)
- Lady Death: Dragon Wars #1 (Apr 1998)
- Lady Death: Goddess Returns #1–2 (Jun – Aug 2002)
- Lady Death: Heartbreaker #1 (Mar 2002)
- Lady Death: In Lingerie #1 (Aug 1995)
- Lady Death: Judgment War #1–3 (Nov 1999 – Jan 2000)
- Lady Death: Judgment War Prelude (Oct 1999)
- Lady Death: Last Rites #1–4 (Oct 2001 – Feb 2002)
- Lady Death: Love Bites #1 (Mar 2001)
- Lady Death: Mischief Night #1 (Nov 2001)
- Lady Death: Re-Imagined #1 (Jul 2002)
- Lady Death: Retribution #1 (Aug 1998)
- Lady Death: River of Fear #1 (Apr 2001)
- Lady Death: Sketch Cards All Stars – Surprise Edition #1 (Aug 2001)
- Lady Death: Swimsuit 2001 #1 (Feb 2001)
- Lady Death: Swimsuit Special #1 (May 1994)
- Lady Death: The Crucible #½ (Jul 1996); #1–6 (Nov 1996 – Oct 1997)
- Lady Death: The Gauntlet #1–2 (Apr – May 2002)
- Lady Death: The Odyssey #1–4 (Apr – Aug 1996)
- Lady Death: The Rapture #1–4 (Jun – Sep 1999)
- Lady Death: Tribulation #1–4 (Dec 2000 – Mar 2001
- Lady Death & Bad Kitty #1 (Sep 2001)
- Lady Death & Jade #1 (Apr 2002)
- Lady Death and the Women of Chaos! Gallery #1 (Nov 1996)
- Lady Death/Bedlam #1 (Jun 2002)
- Lady Death/Chastity #1 (Jan 2002)
- Lady Death/Chastity/Bad Kitty: United #1 (May2002)
- Lady Death/Medieval Witchblade #1 (August 2001; co-published with Top Cow Productions)
- Lady Death vs. Purgatori #1 (Dec 1999)
- Lady Death vs. Vampirella #1 (Mar 1999; co-published with Harris Comics)
  - Lady Death vs. Vampirella II #1 (Mar 2000; co-published with Harris Comics)
- Lady Demon #1–3 (Mar – May 2000)
- Legend of the Sage #1–4 (Aug – Dec 2001)
- Lost #1–3 (Dec 1997 – Feb 1998)
- Lynch Mob #1–4 (Jun 1994 – Sep 1994)

=== M ===
- Mankind #1 (Sep 1999)
- Monster Matinee #1–3 (Oct 1997)
- The Mummy: Valley of the Gods #1 (May 2001)

=== N ===
- Nightmare Theater #1–4 (Nov 1997)

=== O ===
- The Omen #1–5 (May – Sep 1998)
- The Omen: Vexed #1 (Oct 1998)

=== P ===
- Pandemonium #1 (Sep 1998)
- Purgatori #1–7 (Oct 1998 – Mar 1999); #½ (Dec 2000); #0 (Feb 2001)
- Purgatori: Darkest Hour #1–2 (Sep – Oct 2001)
- Purgatori: Empire #1–3 (May – Jul 2000)
- Purgatori: God Hunter #1–2 (Apr – May 2002)
- Purgatori: God Killer #1–2 (Jun – Jul 2002)
- Purgatori: Goddess Rising #1–4 (Jul – Oct 1999)
- Purgatori: Heartbreaker #1 (Mar 2002)
- Purgatori: Love Bites #1 (Mar 2001)
- Purgatori: Mischief Night #1 (Nov 2001)
- Purgatori: Prelude (May 1996)
- Purgatori: Re-Imagined #1 (Jul 2002)
- Purgatori: The Dracula Gambit #1 (Aug 1997)
- Purgatori: The Hunted #1–2 (Jun – Aug 2001)
- Purgatori: The Vampire's Myth #1–3 (Aug – Dec 1996)
- Purgatori Versus Chastity (Jul 2000)
- Purgatori vs. Lady Death #1 (Jan 2001)
- Purgatori vs. Vampirella #1 (Apr 2000; co-published with Harris Comics)

=== R ===
- Rack and Pain: Killers #1–4 (Sep 1996 – Jan 1997)
- The Rock #1 (Jun 2001)

=== S ===
- Smiley: The Psychotic Button #1 (Jul 1998)
- Smiley: The Psychotic Button Anti-Holiday Special #1 (Jan 1999)
- Smiley: The Psychotic Button Spring Break Special #1 (Apr 1999)
- Smiley: The Psychotic Button Whacky Wrestling Special #1 (May 1999)
- Static-X: Machine #1 (Aug 2002)
- Stone Cold Steve Austin #1–4 (Nov 1999 – Feb 2000)
- Suspira #1–4 (Apr – Sep 1997)

=== T ===
- A Tribute to Steven Hughes (Sep 2000)

=== U ===
- The Undead! #1 (Feb 2002)
- Undertaker #1–10 (Apr 1999 – Jan 2000); #0 (1999); #1/2 (Oct 1999)
- Undertaker Halloween Special #1 (Oct 1999)
- Untold Tales of Chastity #1 (Nov 2000)
- Untold Tales of Lady Death #1 (Nov 2000)
- Untold Tales of Purgatori #1 (Nov 2000)

=== V ===
- Vampirella/Lady Death #1 (Feb 1999; co-published with Harris Comics)
- Vandala #1 (Aug 2000)
  - Vandala II #1 (Sep 2001)
- Vigilante 8: 2nd Offense #1 (Dec 1999)

== Doomsday ==
Doomsday is a one-off thrash metal album released in 1995 by the company. The album features a trio, originally from Van Nuys, California but who, at some time between 1995 and 1997, moved to Phoenix, Arizona, playing energetic bass heavy thrash. The CD was released in limited quantity to help promote the Lady Death and Evil Ernie comic franchises. The album cover features Evil Ernie beneath the Doomsday logo. The trio played at Dragon Con '97, but had little or no commercial success beyond this. Doomsday also played at ChillerCon, NJ in 1997 with Scream Queen Tiffany Shepis appearing on stage as a maiden victim.

=== Track listing ===
1. "Inceptive Psychosis" 1:12
2. "Beyond Death" 5:19
3. "Cyborg Killing Machine" 3:38
4. "Who Am I" 4:46
5. "Black Sorrow" 4:21
6. "Resurrection" 4:02
7. "Chaos! Rules" 3:40
8. "Lost Insanity" 5:15
9. "I Dream" 3:54
10. "I Am Dead" 1:52
11. "Take a Shot" 1:58
12. "No Pickles" 0:21

=== Members ===
- Mike Flippin, guitars and vocals
- Dave Chaney, bass guitar
- Johhny Ogle, percussion
