= Steven Hughes =

- Born: Steven Jay Hughes; February 12, 1954 Boston, Massachusetts, U.S.
- Died: February 18, 2000 (aged 46) Scottsdale, Arizona, U.S.
- Area: Artist

Steven Jay Hughes (February 12, 1954 – February 18, 2000) was an American artist for the Chaos! Comics company. Hughes provided the art for many of the company's comics, including Lady Death, Evil Ernie, and the short-lived superhero series Detonator . He also helped to create the signature look of these characters.

== Biography ==
Inspired by EC comics such as Tales from the Crypt, and especially EC artist Wally Wood, Hughes began as an artist for various titles from Aircel Comics.

=== Death ===
Hughes died of cancer on February 18, 2000, in Scottsdale, Arizona. He was survived by his wife Barbara Hughes and his children Amber, Chance, and Samantha.
