= Lady Death =

- Lady Death as depicted on the cover of Dead Rising #1

Publication information
- Publisher: Eternity Comics (1991–1992); Chaos! Comics (1994–2002); CrossGen Comics (2003–2005); Avatar Press (2005–2015); Coffin Comics (2015–present)
- First appearance: Evil Ernie #1 (December 1991)
- Created by: Brian Pulido

In-story information
- Alter ego: Hope, Lady Demon

Lady Death is a fictional goddess appearing in American comic books published by Coffin Comics. Created by Brian Pulido, Lady Death first appeared in Eternity Comics' Evil Ernie #1 in December 1991.

Lady Death then reappeared in the Evil Ernie: The Resurrection miniseries published by Pulido under his now-defunct company Chaos! Comics in 1994. The character was also the subject of a full-length animated feature film released in July 2004 by ADV Films.

Incarnations of the character have been illustrated by such comic book artists as Steven Hughes, Mike Deodato, Romano Molenaar, Dheeraj Verma and Ivan Reis. Brian Pulido has optioned publishing licenses through various independent companies such as CrossGen Comics and Avatar Press. As of 2024, Lady Death was published by Pulido's Coffin Comics. By 2017, the comic had sold 15 million copies in seven languages.

In addition, Lady Death has been depicted in artworks by a number of well-known fantasy artists such as Dorian Cleavenger, Gerald Brom, Boris Vallejo, Joe Jusko and Julie Bell.

== Publication history ==
Lady Death was originally published by Chaos! Comics and remains one of the best examples of the bad girl titles that took the American comic book industry by storm during the late 1990s. The earliest issues of Lady Death were written by Brian Pulido and illustrated by Steven Hughes. Lady Death was originally conceived as a violent antihero, but subsequent iterations have toned down the more controversial aspects of the character.

In August 2002, Chaos! Comics filed for Chapter 7 bankruptcy and the intellectual property rights to Lady Death were sold to CrossGen Entertainment. Pulido continued to work on Lady Death for Crossgen, creating a new series titled Medieval Lady Death that was released in February 2003. This version of Lady Death made substantial changes to the character in an attempt to capture a larger mainstream audience.

Despite Medieval Lady Death enjoying reasonable sales, CrossGen Entertainment ran into financial difficulties of its own and filed for Chapter 11 bankruptcy in June 2004, in Tampa, Florida. During the bankruptcy proceedings, the rights to Lady Death were sold to Avatar Press. The other Chaos! Comics properties were sold to Tales of Wonder.

In 2004, a feature-length animated motion picture based upon the original version of Lady Death was released. Produced by ADV films, the Lady Death animated feature premiered at San Diego Comic-Con on July 23, 2004. The film was poorly received and was not a major financial success.

In July 2005, Avatar Press unveiled a new version of Lady Death. Both Medieval Lady Death as well as the Classic Lady Death were published in separate series. Pulido wrote both series, which featured art by several Avatar Press artists, including Juan José Ryp, Daniel HDR, Richard Ortiz, Ron Adrian, Di Amorin and Gabriel Guzman.

In 2010, Avatar Press created a separate imprint, Boundless Comics, to publish new comics starring the character later that year. Pulido and Mike Wolfer wrote the ongoing series.

In 2015, Pulido launched new Lady Death stories via Kickstarter and later in April 2016, Pulido began publishing new stories under his company Coffin Comics.

== Fictional character biography ==
=== The first Lady Death ===
Lady Death originated as a hallucination by a troubled boy named Ernest "Ernie" Fairchild. Ernie believed Lady Death was his dream girl: a violent, sexy supervillain. She promised to "love Ernie forever" in exchange for his loyalty and a vow to kill everyone on Earth. Initially, Lady Death's appearances in Ernie's stories are those of a muse and confidant. Eventually it is revealed that she is a separate demonic entity. Her true intentions and her past remain a mystery. As Ernie's story progressed, Lady Death moved on to being the protagonist of her own.

=== Classic Lady Death ===
The setting for the original Lady Death comic was medieval Sweden. The woman who would become Lady Death was born a mortal named Hope. Her father was a local nobleman named Matthias who was despised by the peasants as a cruel tyrant for forcibly conscripting peasants into military service as feudal levies. The exact nature of the war that Matthias was prosecuting is not specified, although evidence from the recent revision of the character by Avatar Press suggests that it may have been one of the Northern Crusades (also known as the Baltic Crusades).

Unknown to his innocent daughter, Matthias had a dark secret. Although congratulated by the Church for his work against the pagans and was outwardly pious, Matthias secretly dabbled in black magic and demonology. He was actually a descendant of the fallen angels who had led the rebellion against God. By contrast, Hope's mother was a woman so pure and innocent that her bloodline reached Heaven. Hope's mother died when Hope was still in her late teens, and she was left to live with her father.

Eventually, Matthias' cruelty triggered a peasant uprising. Matthias narrowly escaped death at the hands of the rebels by summoning a demon, but Hope was captured by the rebels and accused of witchcraft. Faced with the prospect of execution by burning at the stake, Hope uttered an incantation that she had overheard her father use. This incantation summoned a demon who offered her a bargain – he would rescue her from death if she would renounce her humanity and serve the powers of Hell. Hope accepted the bargain and was transported into the infernal realms.

Once in Hell, Hope became entangled in a civil war that was raging between Lucifer and an army of renegade devils led by a powerful sorcerer. Hope was devastated when she learned that the ambitious sorcerer challenging Lucifer for the control of Hell was her own father.

Gradually corrupted by the nature of her surrounding, Hope was tainted with evil. She allied herself with an exiled craftsman who forged weapons for the infernal armies. While speaking to him, she declared that the innocent woman she had once been was dead and that she would henceforth only be known as Lady Death.

In her new persona, Lady Death led an uprising against the Lords of Hell. During the final battle, Lucifer cursed her never to return to Earth while the living walked. Lady Death swore an oath that she would circumvent Lucifer's curse by exterminating all life on Earth.

Lady Death finally ended Lucifer's control over her by casting him through Heaven's Gate (a place where evil cannot go), and in doing so became the new ruler of Hell. Many of the beings living in hell believe that the ascension of Lady Death signaled the beginning of the age of judgment – the final battle between good and evil for the fate of the Earth.

=== Classic Lady Death at Avatar Press ===
Avatar Press began publishing Lady Death titles in 2005. Since they only have the rights to Lady Death alone, and not the rest of the Chaos! Comics characters that were intertwined with her original story, Lady Death has been given a new origin story, with notable differences to the story told at Chaos! Comics.

Hope is the daughter of Mary and Marius. Marius is a crusader who has been waging endless campaigns against the pagans, always returning with only his most loyal soldiers, while the peasant levies were slaughtered. This angered the survivors.

Hope, realising that her father has changed and is no longer the man he once was, follows him into the dungeons, with her mother close behind. The townsfolk meanwhile batter down the gates and invade the castle, intent on revenge. Hope discovers her father summoning dark wraiths, and sacrificing the souls of countless peasants in exchange for a kingdom in The Labyrinth. The wraiths refer to her father as Sagos.

Sagos grabs hold of Mary, revealing that he has possessed Marius' body, and they disappear through the portal, leaving Hope behind. Cheated of their revenge, the villagers decide to burn Hope at the stake as a witch. Not wishing to die, Hope casts the spell she overheard her father cast, and summons the wraiths herself. The wraiths agree to transport her through the portal, if she forsakes her humanity and pledges her soul to The Labyrinth. Hope passes through the portal, her skin and hair turning albino in the process (the mark of all those who willingly choose to pass through the portal), and finds herself in the Blacklands.

There she encounters Wargoth, who observes her uncontrolled and instinctive use of magic, and agrees to help her destroy Sagos and rescue her mother. He recruits the sorceress Satasha to teach Hope spellcraft. Wargoth also teaches her how to fight, but every weapon she wields melts in her hand due to her uncontrolled energy.

Over the next two years, Lady Death and her companions fight through the Blacklands, hunting for Sagos. All the while Sagos' undead army destroys and converts the cities of the Blacklands. Eventually, Lady Death and her companions track Sagos down to a temple in Karrion, where they discover Sagos holding Lady Death's mother in chains. Sagos defeats them easily and brings the temple down around them. Lady Death digs herself out and is attacked by Nameless Wolves, slaying all but two of them. These two wolves become her companions.

In the city of Asuwa, Lady Death recovers the sword Deathbringer, which was specially made for her by Satasha and The Silent One. Deathbringer is able to withstand her energies without being destroyed, and allows her to channel her magic through it.

Lady Death then bathes in the Fanghorn river, which grants knowledge of elemental magic to those who survive the experience. She uses this power to save Satasha's home city from destruction, but learns that Sagos does not plan to just conquer the Blacklands, but to wipe out all life, and that he has the means to do it.

=== Coffin Comics ===
Lady Death is awakened by an old ally and finds two decades have passed she goes onward to exact vengeance on her enemies and is reunited with her long lost children.

== Lady Death comic series ==
=== Chaos! Comics ===
Series published by Chaos! Comics include:

- The Reckoning #1–3, 1/2 (1994)
- Lady Death Swimsuit Special (1994 pin-up edition)
- Lady Death in Lingerie (1995 pin-up edition with various artists)
- Between Heaven & Hell #1–4 (1995)
- Chaos Quarterly 1 (1995)
- Chaos Quarterly 2 (1996)
- Chaos Quarterly 3 (1996)
- The Odyssey #1–4 (1996)
- The Crucible 1/2, 1–6 (1996)
- Death Becomes Her (1997)
- Wicked Ways (1998)
- The Harrowing (1998)
- The Covenant (1998)
- Dragon Wars (1998)
- Retribution (1998)
- Inferno (1999)
- The Rapture #1–4 (1999)
- Judgement War #1–3 (1999)
- Armageddon (1999)
- Dark Millennium #1–3 (2000)
- Tribulation #1–4 (2000)
- Love Bites (2001)
- Mischief Night (2001)
- River Of Fear (2001)
- Alive #1–4 (2001)
- Last Rites (2001)
- Lady Death/Chastity (2002)
- Heartbreaker (2002)
- Lady Death & Jade (2002)
- The Gauntlet #1–2 (2002)
- Goddess Returns #1–2 (2002)
- Dark Alliance #1–3 (2002, final series from Chaos – incomplete)

=== CrossGen Comics ===
Series published at CrossGen:

- A Medieval Tale (2003)
- The Wild Hunt (2004, incomplete)

=== Avatar Press ===
Avatar Press published two versions of Lady Death: the Classic version (revamped slightly due to her separation from the Chaos! Comics universe), and Medieval Lady Death (the all-ages version from "A Medieval Tale" published at CrossGen).

- Classic Lady Death:
  - Abandon All Hope (2005)
  - Death Goddess (2005)
  - The Wicked (2005)
  - Dead Rising (*) (2004)
  - Infernal Sins (*) (2006, special art & previews of future issues)
  - Lost Souls (crossover between Lady Death, War Angel, Pandora, and Unholy; 2005–2006)
    - Lady Death vs War Angel (sequel to Lost Souls)
    - Lady Death vs Pandora (conclusion to Lost Souls trilogy)
  - Lady Death / Shi
  - Sacrilege
  - Annual 2006
  - Blacklands (2006–2007)
  - 2005 Bikini Special (*) (2005)
  - Leather & Lace (*) (2005)
  - Swimsuit 2005 (*) (2005)
  - Fetishes (*) (2006)
  - 2007 Swimsuit Special (*) (2007)
  - The Art of Juan Jose Ryp (*) (2007)
  - Warrior Temptress (*) (2007)
  - Pirate Queen (*)
    - (*)=To be read in no particular order.
- Medieval Lady Death:
  - Medieval Lady Death (2005)
  - Medieval Lady Death/Belladonna (2005)
  - Medieval Lady Death: War of the Winds (2006–2007)

=== Boundless Comics ===
- Lady Death Series (2010–2013)
- Origins Cursed (2012)
- Origins (2015)
- Lady Death Apocalypse (2015)

=== Coffin Comics ===
- Lady Death Rules! Vol. I (collects Lady Death Rules! #1–3: Chaos Rules, Damnation Game and Extinction Express)
- Lady Death Rules! Vol. II (collects Lady Death Rules! #4–7: Oblivion Kiss, Merciless Onslaught, Unholy Ruin and Apocalyptic Abyss)
- Lady Death Rules! Vol. III (collects Lady Death Rules! #8–10: Nightmare Symphony, Scorched Earth and Blasphemy Anthem)
- Malevolent Decimation (May 2020)
- Treacherous Infamy (November 2020)
- Cataclysmic Majesty (June 2021)
- Sacrificial Annihilation (December 2021)
- Hellwitch Vs. Lady Death: Wargasm (March 2022)
- Necrotic Genesis (July 2022)
- Diabolical Harvest (January 2023)
- Cybernetic Desecration (August 2023)
- Imperial Requiem (January 2024)
- Demonic Omens (August 2024)
- La Muerta/Lady Death: Inferno! (October 2024)
- Hellwitch/Lady Death: Hellgasm (2025)

== In other media ==
=== Lady Death: The Motion Picture ===
Lady Death: The Motion Picture was released in 2004 by ADV Films.

The film begins in 15th century Sweden, where Hope, the beautiful daughter of Matthias, a skilled mercenary who is in actuality a demon, is accused of being the devil's consort. Sentenced by the town priest to be burned at the stake, Matthias, through his proxy, the jester Pagan, offers her life if she surrenders herself to him and joins him in Hell. Matthias's plan to corrupt her is met with unanticipated resistance, as Hope rejects his scheme and eventually finds herself transformed into the powerful warrior Lady Death, who challenges Lucifer for control of Hell itself.

Many of the events from the comics are altered in the animated film. Instead of summoning a demon with whom she bargains for her life, Hope's spell summons a pair of flying demons that carry her physically to Hell (restoring her badly burned body in the process), dropping her in the court of her father, who intends for her to join him by his side. When she refuses, he casts her out, only for her to side with the master blacksmith Cremator, an escaped slave of his, and to lead an army of hellspawn creatures against him. In this continuity, her curse is to be trapped in Hell for as long as one of Lucifer's allies remains alive. Unlike in the comic, Lady Death is presented as more of a heroine whose goal isn't to destroy all life on Earth, but to liberate Hell from Lucifer's tyranny.

=== Lady Death Demonicron ===
Lady Death Demonicron, a canonical beat-em-up video game set in the Lady Death universe, has been funded on Kickstarter and is currently in development for PlayStation 5, Xbox Series, and the Nintendo Switch, courtesy of developer Art of Play Games.

== Accolades ==
The character was ranked 39th in Comics Buyer's Guide's "100 Sexiest Women in Comics" list.

== See also ==
- Purgatori, her nemesis in Chaos! Comics
