= Christina Strain =

American artist

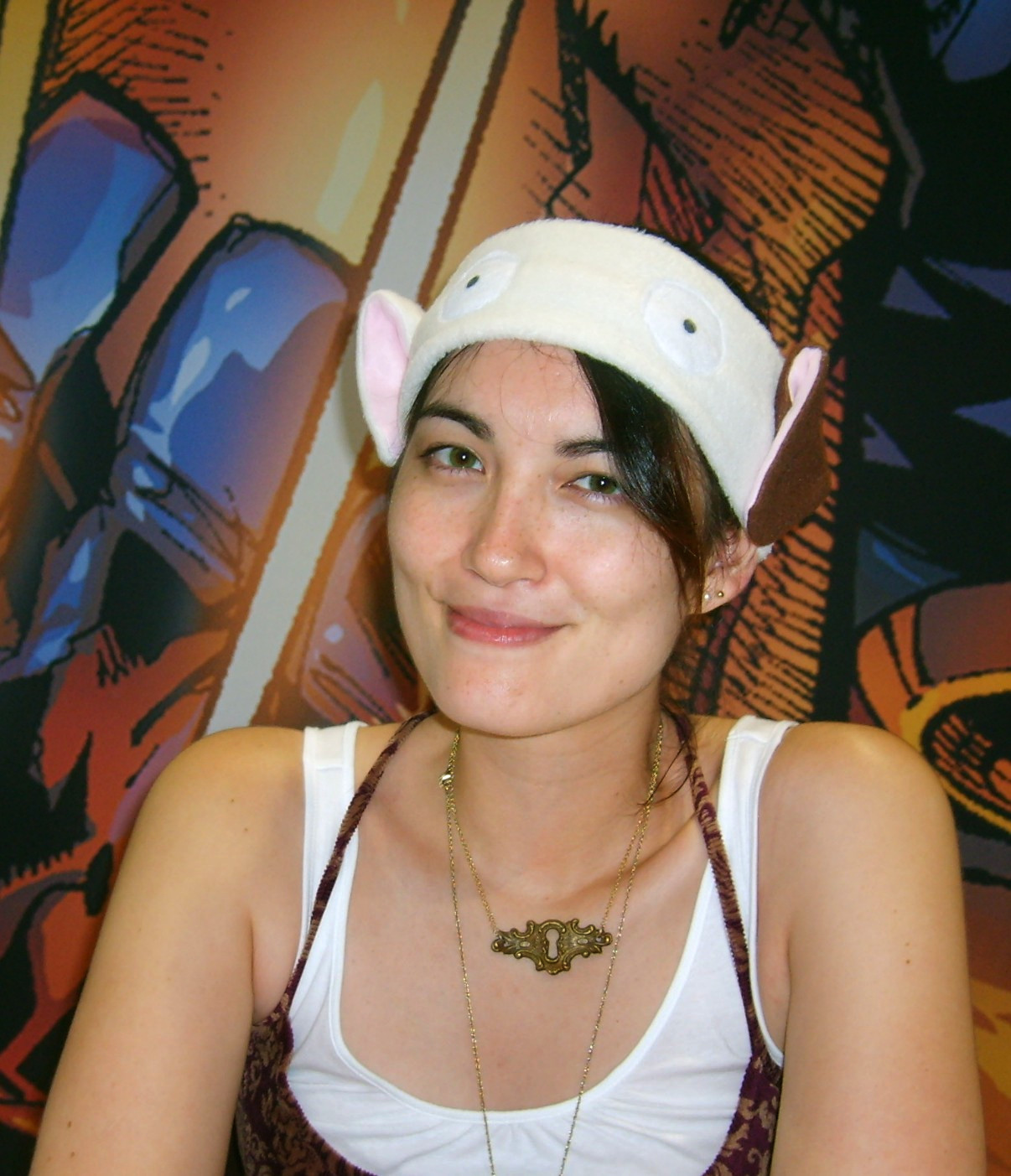
- Strain at Comic-Con 2007
- Born: April 27, 1981 (age 45) Seoul, South Korea
- Areas: Writer, Colourist
- Notable works: Runaways; Grimm Fairy Tales; Generation X Spider-Man Loves Mary Jane; The Magicians

Christina Strain (born April 27, 1981) is an American comic book colorist, writer and screenwriter. Strain formerly worked for Marvel Comics as a colorist before pursuing a career as a writer. Strain's notable works include the award-winning Marvel series Runaways, Marvel's Generation X, the Syfy TV series The Magicians, and the Netflix series Shadow and Bone.

== Life ==
Strain was born in Seoul, South Korea, on April 27, 1981. She lived in South Korea for the majority of her youth, as her mother was from Gunsan, South Korea, and her father was an Air Force officer stationed in South Korea. Except for a brief three years living in Illinois, from 1983 to 1986, Strain lived in South Korea for about fifteen years, during which she lived near a military base and attended Seoul American Elementary School and High School. Upon graduating high school, Strain moved back to the United States in 1999 to attend Louisiana State University in Baton Rouge, where she majored in graphic design.

Strain resides in Los Angeles, California, with her husband Jon Shiring, a lead engineer at Respawn Entertainment, and their adopted son.

== Career ==
Strain got her start in comics working as a colorist for CrossGen in 2003. She was let go after two months working at CrossGen when the company began having financial problems and eventually went bankrupt in 2004. Weeks after losing her job at CrossGen, Strain began working for UDON and Aspen. Strain worked for UDON from 2003 to 2005, during which she contacted and impressed the Editor-in-Chief of UDON, Erik Ko, who helped her get a job at Marvel Comics. One of the first comics Strain worked on for Marvel was Runaways, which she worked on as an official colorist for about 6 years. Other prominent comics Strain worked on for Marvel include; Spider-Man Loves Mary Jane, S.H.I.E.L.D., and World War Hulk. Additionally, Strain colored several Jay Company exclusive comic covers such as the Grimm Fairy Tales. Strain worked as a colorist for Marvel for 8 years, before she retired at 32 and decided to go to grad school at the American Film Institute. Initially, Strain was interested in 3-D graphics, but after taking a comic-writing class she realized she really wanted to write stories, so she switched her focus to screenwriting.

While she was transitioning to a writing career, Strain collaborated with various artists to produce original works. Strain and Adrian Alphona, who previously worked together on the Marvel series Runaways, collaborated on an art book. Together they published Sweetness in 2011, consisting of random art illustrated by Aphona and colored and finished by Strain. In 2011, Strain met Jayd Aït-Kaci, an artist she long admired according to a Newsarama interview, through a mutual friend. Strain proposed that they collaborate on a webcomic and pitched various story ideas, of which Aït-Kaci liked The Fox Sister the best. Strain wrote the script for The Fox Sister and Aït-Kaci illustrated it, and they published the first few pages of The Fox Sister in July 2017 on their official website. Strain and Aït-Kaci always planned to officially publish The Fox Sister as a 9x12 hardbound comic book, and in 2012 they compiled and published the first chapter of their webcomic.

The Fox Sister takes inspiration from the Korean folklore by the same name, and is about a kumiho, a nine-tailed fox demon. On the webcomics official website, Stain describes The Fox Sister as a "Korean Supernatural thriller/dram-edy story" set in South Korea in the 1960s. As of October 2017, Strain has completed writing the fourth and final chapter of The Fox Sister. However, The Fox Sister is officially on hiatus according to the webcomic's website, and as of December 2018, only 17 pages of chapter four have been released. The Fox Sister continues to be available to freely read online.

After her career switch from colorist to writer, Strain began working as a staff writer for the Syfy TV series The Magicians, during its second season. As of December 2018, Strain continues to be employed as a staff writer for The Magicians. While writing for The Magicians, Strain returned to the comic book industry when Marvel editor Chris Robinson asked her to write a short story for a Civil War anthology, Civil War II: Choosing Sides. After writing for the anthology, Strain was officially reintroduced to the comic world as a writer when she was asked to write for the rebooted X-Men series, Generation X. Strain was allowed to create her own concept and list of mutant characters for the rebooted Generation X, thus Strain came up with the concept of "lovable losers". Strain chose to feature a mix of original and already established but lesser known mutants, such as Nathaniel Carver created by Strain, and Nature Girl (Lin Li) created by Jason Latour. The relaunched Generation X series ran for a year, from 2017 to 2018 and published 11 issues, ending at No. 87 under the Marvel Legacy relaunch's numbering system.

== Bibliography ==
=== Colorist ===
==== Marvel ====
(2003–2011)

- Amazing Fantasy vol. 2, No. 15 Cover
- Araña| The Heart of the Spider No. 12 Cover
- Astonishing X-Men vol. 5, and No. 29
- Avengers Fairy Tales No. 1, #3
- Captain Britain and MI13 Annual 01
- Civil War: Front Line No. 1
- Daredevil: Shadowland Omnibus
- Dark Avengers/Uncanny X-Men: Exodus #1
- Dark Avengers/Uncanny X-Men: Utopia
- Dark Reign: Young Avengers No. 1
- Daughters of the Dragon #1–6
- Deadpool Classic vol. 2
- Giant-Size Avengers No. 1
- The Hulk 100 Project
- Hulk Chronicles: WWH #2–6
- I ♥ Marvel: Marvel Ai
- Incredible Hercules vol. 4, vol. 5, No. 126
- The Incredible Hulk vol. 14
- Loners #1–5
- Marvel Fairy Tales
- Marvel Heroes Extra No. 7
- Marvel Holiday Special 2004, 2005
- Marvel Icons No. 26, #36
- Marvel Mega No. 24
- Marvel Monster Edition No. 35
- Marvel Now!: X-Men No. 1
- Marvel Tales Flip Magazine No. 15
- Marvel Romance Redux: But I Thought He Loved Me! Cover
- Marvel Adventures Spider-Man #16,19,20 Covers
- Marvel Adventures Fantastic Four No. 13 Cover
- Mary Jane #1–4
- Mary Jane: Homecoming #1–4
- Mighty Marvel: Women of Marvel
- The Mighty World of Marvel #1–3, No. 5
- Ms. Marvel No. 41
- Ms. Marvel: War of the Marvels Must Have #1
- New Avengers No. 13
- Original of Marvel Comics: X-Men #1
- Spider-Man Loves Mary Jane #1-present
- Runaways (2003) vol. 2, vol. 3, #8–10,13–18
- Runaways (2005) vol. 4, vol. 5, vol. 6, vol. 7, vol. 8 #1–30
- Runaways Saga (2007)
- Runaways (2008) vol. 9, vol. 10, vol. 11, #1–14
- S.H.I.E.L.D. (2010) #1–6
- S.H.I.E.L.D. (2011) Collected edition 01, and No. 4
- Secret Invasion (2008)
- Secret Invasion by Brian Michael Bendis Omnibus
- Secret Invasion: Runaways/Young Avengers #1–3
- Shadowland #1–3
- Shane the She Devil: Survival of the Fittest #1
- Siege: Thor
- Spider-Man Fairy Tales No. 3
- Spider-Man Family No. 4
- Spider-Man Loves Mary Jane #1–20
- Spider-Man Unlimited No. 7
- Strange #1–2
- Target Marvel Age Mary Jane: Circle of Friends (2004)
- Thor (1996) No. 600, #604–605, #607–609
- Thor (2007) vol. 2, vol. 3
- Thor (2008) No. 8
- Thor by J. Michael Straczynski Omnibus (2010)
- Thor Giant-Size Finale No. 1
- Thor: the Trial of Thor (2009) No. 1
- Thor: the Trial of Thor (2017)
- Uncanny X-Force vol. 1, #3–5
- Uncanny X-Men
- What If? Civil War vol. 4
- What If? X-Men-Rise And Fall of the Shi'ar Empire No. 1
- Wolverine (1989) No. 232
- Wolverine (1997) No. 184
- Wolverine (2003) No. 67
- Wolverine By Mark Millar Omnibus (2013)
- Women of Marvel Poster Book (2006)
- World War Hulk (2007) #1–5
- World War Hulk (2008) #1–5
- World War Hulk Prologue: World Breaker (2007) #1
- X-Men (1991) No. 191
- X-Men (2013) vol. 1, No. 2
- X-Men [FRA] (1997) No. 127, #140, No. 143, #147, No. 159, #161
- X-Men [GER] (2001) No. 81, #95–96, No. 99, #105, No. 108, #113
- X-Men [NL] No. 298
- X-Men Extra No. 61, #100
- X-Men Legacy vol. 1, # 208
- X-Men Universe #2–5
- X-Men: Divided We Stand No. 2
- X-Men: Manifest Destiny #4–5
- X-Men: Pixie Strikes Back #1–4
- X-Men: Kitty Pryde-Shadow & Flame No. 1, Covers #2–5
- Uncanny X-Men Annual No. 1
- X-Men No. 191
- Young Avengers Presents No. 4

==== Aspen ====
(2003–2005)

- Aspen Seasons 2005: Spring
- Fathom vol. 2, #0–4
- Fathom Beginnings No. 1
- Fathom: Dawn of War #0–3
- Fathom Omnibus vol. 1, vol. 2
- Fathom Sonderheft #3

==== DC ====
(2003–2005)

- Action Comics #812–813 (separations)
- Adventures of Superman #625–626 (separations)
- DC Comics Presents: Supergirl/Superman #1
- Love is Love
- Supergirl vol. 5, No. 0
- Superman vol. 2, #202–203 (separations)
- Superman: Godfall (2004)
- Superman/Batman vol. 2, No. 19, #3

==== Misc ====
- Archard's Agents: The Case of the Puzzled Pugilist
- Atomika #1–7
- G.I. Joe #31–33 (Fantome Back-up Story)
- Meridian #19, No. 42
- Phonogram: The Singles Club #4
- Shi: Illustrated Warrior No. 2, 4
- Street Fighter II vol. 4
- Street Fighter Tribute (2008) Artbook
- Sweetness, coauthored with Adrian Alphona (line artist)
- The Ultimate Graphic Novel Collection vol. 55 (#51), vol. 59 (#53)
- Violent Messiahs No. 7

==== Jay Company exclusive covers ====
(Note: Many Jay Company Exclusives have multiple covers done by the same or different artists)

- Grimm Fairy Tales: Return to Wonderland No. 0
- Purgatori No. 1, 3

=== Writer ===
- Civil War II: Choosing Sides No. 6
- Generation X vol. 1, vol. 2, #1–9, #85–87

==== Self-published ====
- The Fox Sister, webcomic illustrated by Jayd Aït-Kaci

=== Screenwriter ===
- Wake Up (Short) (2014)
- Zelos (Short) (2015)
- In Pursuit (Short) (2016)
- The Magicians (2017–2019)
  - 2.07 - Plan B (2017)
  - 2.12 - Ramifications (co-writer with David Reed, 2017)
  - 3.10 - The Art of the Deal (2018)
  - 4.06 - A Timeline and Place (2019)
  - 4.11 - The 4-1-1 (co-writer with Henry Alonso Myers, 2019)
- Shadow and Bone (2021)
- Finding 'Ohana (2021)
