= Nightly News =

Nightly News may refer to:

- NBC Nightly News in the United States
- InfoWars Nightly News with Alex Jones in the United States
- CNN Philippines Nightly News in the Philippines
- ITV Nightly News in the United Kingdom
- The Nightly News, a six-issue American comic book limited series.
- Nightly News (CCTV) in China
