= Nick Pitarra =

American comic book artist

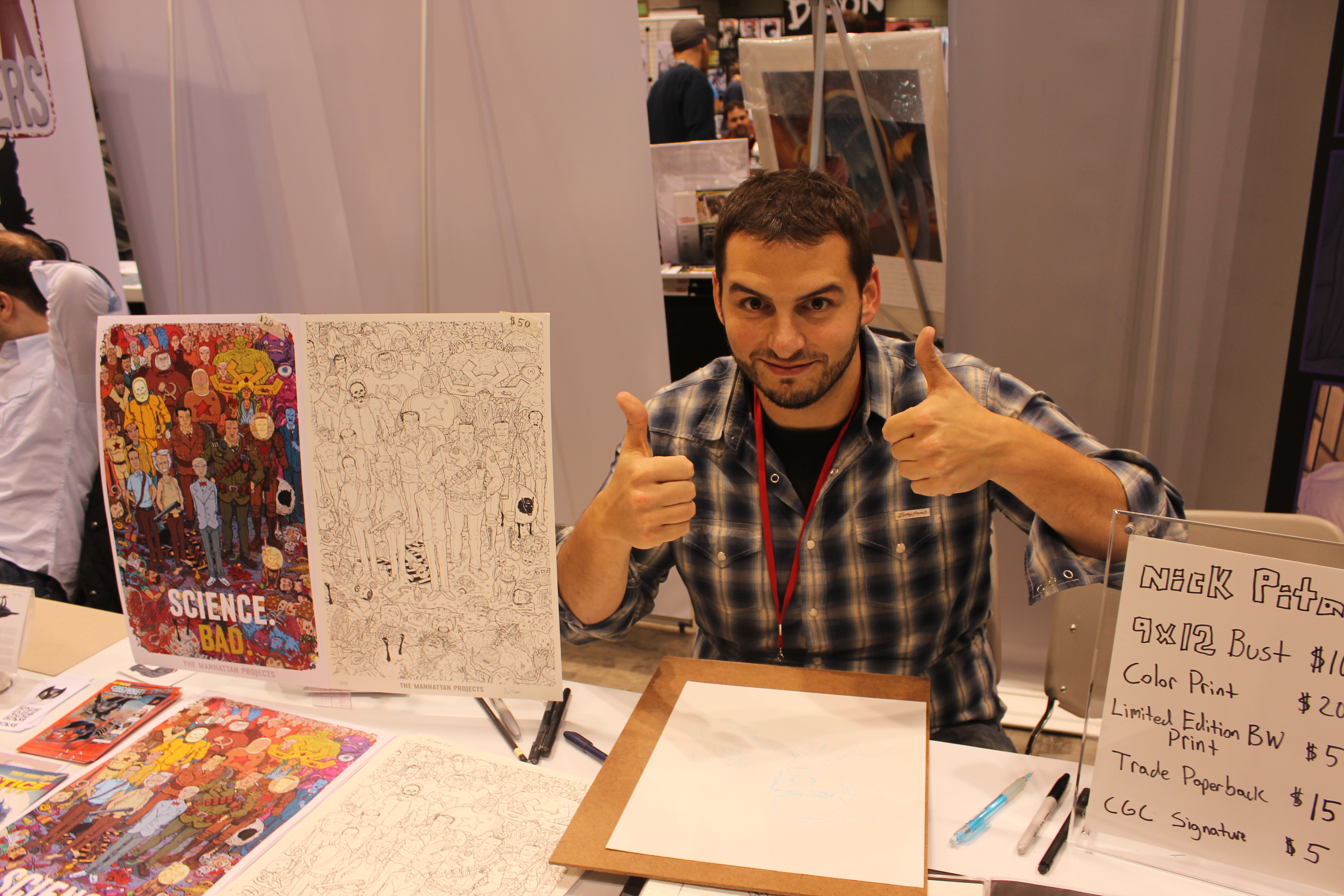
- Pitarra at C2E2, 2013
- Areas: Penciller, Inker
- Notable works: The Manhattan Projects

Nick Pitarra is an American comic book artist known for his numerous collaborations with writer Jonathan Hickman, which include mini-series The Red Wing and The Manhattan Projects, both released through Image Comics. Pitarra is a member of Ten Ton Studios.

== Bibliography ==
=== Interior work ===
- Some Big Lumberjack vol. 1 #2: "The E-Men" (script by Christopher Peel and Tom Martin, one-shot, name misspelled in credits as Nick Paterra, Half-Ass Publishing 2003)
- Astonishing Tales vol. 2 #1-6: "Bobby and Sam in Mojoworld" (with Jonathan Hickman, anthology, Marvel, 2009)
- Ten Ton Studios' Jam Comic #2: "page twenty-two" (script and art, webcomic, Ten Ton Studios, 2010)
- S.H.I.E.L.D.: Infinity: "Chapter One: Colossus" (with Jonathan Hickman, one-shot, Marvel, 2011)
- The Red Wing #1-4 (with Jonathan Hickman, Image, 2011)
- The Manhattan Projects #1-9, 11-14, 16-18, 20, 22-25 (with Jonathan Hickman, Image, 2012–2014)
  - The Manhattan Projects: The Sun Beyond the Stars #1-4 (with Jonathan Hickman, Image, 2015)
- Teenage Mutant Ninja Turtles Universe #6: "Squik" (script and art, anthology, IDW Publishing, 2017)
- Where We Live: "How I Live Now" (with Neil Kleid, anthology graphic novel, Image, 2018)
- Leviathan #1-3 (with John Layman, Image, 2018)
  - The series was postponed indefinitely after issue 3.
- Doom Patrol: Weight of the Worlds #4 (with Gerard Way and Jeremy Lambert, DC's Young Animal, 2019)

=== Covers only ===
- Morning Glories #27 (Shadowline, 2013)
- Teenage Mutant Ninja Turtles vol. 6 #19, 28 (IDW Publishing, 2013)
- Teenage Mutant Ninja Turtles: Utrom Empire #1-3 (IDW Publishing, 2014)
- And then Emily was Gone #2 (ComixTribe, 2014)
- The Life After #1-7 (Oni Press, 2014)
- Rasputin #1 (Image, 2014)
- The Transformers vs. G.I. Joe #5 (IDW Publishing, 2014)
- God Hates Astronauts #5 (Image, 2015)
- Valhalla Mad #1 (Image, 2015)
- Silk #3 (Marvel, 2015)
- John Flood #1 (Boom! Studios, 2015)
- Secret Wars: Red Skull #1 (Marvel, 2015)
- Secret Wars: Weirdworld #2 (Marvel, 2015)
- Judge Dredd vol. 2 #5 (IDW Publishing, 2016)
- Kennel Block Blues #1 (Boom! Studios, 2016)
- Interceptor #2-3 (Heavy Metal, 2016)
- Street Fighter × G.I. Joe #2 (IDW Publishing, 2016)
- Deviations: Teenage Mutant Ninja Turtles #1 (IDW Publishing, 2016)
- Teenage Mutant Ninja Turtles: Bebop and Rocksteady (IDW Publishing):
  - Bebop and Rocksteady Destroy Everything! #1-5 (2016)
  - Bebop and Rocksteady Hit the Road #1-5 (2018)
- Micronauts vol. 5 #3 (IDW Publishing, 2016)
- ROM #1 (IDW Publishing, 2016)
- Adventure Time Comics #1 (KaBOOM!, 2016)
- Teenage Mutant Ninja Turtles: Dimension X #1-5 (IDW Publishing, 2017)
- Animal Noir #1-2 (IDW Publishing, 2017)
- Redneck #7-12 (Image, 2017–2018)
- Quantum and Woody vol. 3 #1-4 (Valiant, 2017–2018)
- Rocko's Modern Life #1 (KaBOOM!, 2017)
- Grass Kings #11 (Boom! Studios, 2018)
- Hellish Beasts (Black Rose Writing, 2019)

== Sources ==
Interviews

- Harper, David (August 1, 2011). "Artist August: Nick Pitarra". Multiversity Comics.
- Smithee, Alan (January 6, 2012). "Interview with Nick Pitarra". Wednesday's Heroes.
- Tabrys, Jason (January 22, 2013). "Nick Pitarra Talks Conspiring with Hickman On "Manhattan Projects"". Comic Book Resources. Archived from the original on January 23, 2013.
- Hudson, Jeremy (June 13, 2013). "Comic Interview: THE MANHATTAN PROJECTS' Nick Pitarra". Screen Invasion. Archived from the original on June 19, 2013.
- Magnett, Chase (September 8, 2014). "Interview: Nick Pitarra: the Project of 'Manhattan Projects'". Comics Bulletin.
