= S.H.I.E.L.D. (comic book) =

American comic book series

Publication information
- Publisher: Marvel Comics
- Format: Ongoing series
- Publication date: S.H.I.E.L.D. (2010): April 2010 – February 2012; S.H.I.E.L.D. (2014): December 2014 – January 2016
- No. of issues: S.H.I.E.L.D. (2010): 11; S.H.I.E.L.D. (2014): 12
- Main character(s): Nick Fury, Phil Coulson

S.H.I.E.L.D. is the title of several American comic book series published by Marvel Comics focusing on the various adventures of the agents working for the fictional organization S.H.I.E.L.D. or about the organization's history and impact.

== Publication history ==
=== Volume 1 ===
The first volume of the series was published from 2010 to 2011 and was part of a series by Jonathan Hickman.

1. Chapter One: The Unholy Resurrection of Leonardo da Vinci, (June 2010)
2. Chapter Two: Newton's Theory of Eternal Life, (August 2010)
3. Chapter Three: The Theory of Eternal Life, (October 2010)
4. Chapter Four: The Madness, the Star Child, and the Celestial Madonna, (December 2010)
5. Chapter Five: The Forgotten Machines of Nikola Tesla, (February 2011)
6. Chapter Six: The Master's Hand, (April 2011)

=== Volume 2 ===
The second volume of the series was published in 2011 and was the second part of a series by Jonathan Hickman.

1. Chapter One: Terribilità, (August 2011)
2. Chapter Two: Fire, (October 2011)
3. Chapter Three: The Fall, (December 2011)
4. Chapter Four: All Together Now, (February 2012)
5. Chapter Five: Yesterday. Today. Tomorrow., (July 2018)
6. Chapter Six: I Am the Sun, (August 2018)

=== Volume 3 ===
The third volume of the title was written by Mark Waid and published between 2015 and 2016.

1. Active Mission: Perfect Bullets, (February 2015)
2. Active Mission: The Animator, (March 2015)
3. Active Mission: Home Invasion, (April 2015)
4. Active Mission: Fuel, (June 2015)
5. Active Mission: Magic Bullets, (June 2015)
6. Active Mission: Dark Dimensions, (July 2015)
7. Active Mission: The Strange Case of Daisy Johnson and Mr. Hyde, (August 2015)
8. Active Mission: No Angel, (September 2015)
9. Active Mission: The Man Called D.E.A.T.H., (October 2015)
10. Active Mission: The Duck Called H.O.W.A.R.D., (November 2015)
11. Active Mission: Fortune's Favor, (December 2015)
12. Active Mission: Kingslayer, (January 2016)

== Collected editions ==
| Title | Material collected | Publication date | ISBN |
|---|---|---|---|
| S.H.I.E.L.D. Architects of Forever | S.H.I.E.L.D. Vol 1, #1-6 | 2011; 2010 | HC: 978-0785148944; TPB: 978-0785144229 |
| S.H.I.E.L.D. The Human Machine | S.H.I.E.L.D. Vol 2, #1-6 S.H.I.E.L.D.: Infinity, #1 | 2018; 2019 | HC: 978-0785152491; TPB: 978-0785152507 |
| S.H.I.E.L.D. Perfect Bullets | S.H.I.E.L.D. Vol 3, #1-6 | 2015 | 978-0785193623 |
| S.H.I.E.L.D. The Man Called D.E.A.T.H. | S.H.I.E.L.D. Vol 3, #7-12 | 2016 | 978-0785193630 |

== See also ==
- 2010 in comics
- 2014 in comics
