= East of West =

Monthly comic book series

- Cover of East of West 1, art by Nick Dragotta

Publication information
- Publisher: Image Comics
- Schedule: Monthly
- Format: Ongoing series
- Publication date: March 2013 – December 2019
- No. of issues: 45

Creative team
- Created by: Jonathan Hickman, Nick Dragotta
- Written by: Jonathan Hickman
- Artist: Nick Dragotta
- Letterer: Rus Wooton
- Colorist: Frank Martin

East of West is an American monthly comic book series published by Image Comics which debuted in March 2013 and was concluded in December 2019. Created by writer Jonathan Hickman and artist Nick Dragotta, the book is a science fiction Western set in a dystopian version of the United States whose fate rests with one of the Four Horsemen of the Apocalypse.

== Publication history ==
At the 2012 New York Comic Con, Image Comics announced East of West as one of the publisher's new titles in 2013. The series reunited writer Jonathan Hickman and illustrator Nick Dragotta, who had previously collaborated on Fantastic Four for Marvel Comics. In an interview with Comic Book Resources, Dragotta recalled: "I remember a few email exchanges where we said we should work together again sometime, maybe do a creator-owned book. That was kind of it. It gestated for a little while when we worked on FF and our relationship grew tighter. We met at the last Image Expo and sat down for lunch. He told me he had this great idea for a Western, and I said I wanted to draw science fiction. We merged it into a sci-fi Western, and that's how the idea was born." The first issue of East of West was released on March 27, 2013.

== Premise ==
Hickman told Previews catalogue that the tagline of East of West is "The things that divide us are stronger than the things that unite us." Hickman explained, "The end times are imminent and we all hate each other too much to come together and solve our problems. Our final destination is imminent, and it is the Apocalypse. And then, in the face of all that despair and gloom, somehow there is still hope." The series, a science-fiction Western set in a dystopian America, casts the Four Horsemen of the Apocalypse as heroes. Of these four characters, Hickman describes Death – a "Clint Eastwood-y" man wearing a suit, cowboy hat and skull bolo tie – as someone who feels "betrayed", and the others (War, Famine and Conquest) as feeling "abandoned". The second arc, according to Dragotta, focuses on the Chosen, "a group of elites from the Seven Nations who are working to bring about the end of the world."

== Plot ==
Set in the dystopian 2064 United States, the series explores an alternate timeline where in the past, the Civil War never ended and an extended war continued until a comet hits present-day Kansas in 1908. The six warring parties met at Armistice-the site of the comet's impact-and made a truce. This resulted in the signing of the treaty forming "the Seven Nations of America": the Armistice, The Union, The Confederacy, the Kingdom of New Orleans, the Endless Nation, the Republic of Texas, and the People's Republic of America (PRA). On the day of the treaty signing, Elijah Longstreet, a Confederate Army soldier under Stonewall Jackson, and Red Cloud, the chief of chiefs to the Native American tribes of the Endless Nation, simultaneously prophesied what would later become part of The Message. Both immediately collapsed and died after delivering their respective prophecies.

In 1958, Chairman Mao Zedong of the PRA wrote the addendum to his Little Red Book; this addendum was the third piece of the prophecy meant to complete The Message, which foretold the Apocalypse.

Since then, The Four Horsemen of the Apocalypse (Death, War, Famine, and Conquest) physically manifest and seeks to fulfill the prophecies. Believers of the Message periodically make pilgrimages to the Armistice, only to be slaughtered by the Horsemen on the way. Conquest decided to adopt one of the pilgrim's orphans, named him Ezra Orion, then raised and trained him to be the Keeper of the Message. A structure over Armistice was built to prevent any pilgrimages. Ezra became the first of "the Chosen", a group whose later members are Believers and high-ranking officials representing each Nation. The Chosen members are assigned to help bring about the Apocalypse.

On their path to the Apocalypse, the Horsemen got derailed when Death falls in love with Xiaolian, a daughter of Mao V. In 2054, she and Death had a son together; this urges Death to abandon the Horsemen and their mission. However, this coupling was envisioned by the prophecy, with their son being interpreted as "the Beast of the Apocalypse". Hu, Xiaolian's sister and a member of the Chosen, betrays her sister to the remaining Horsemen. Xiaiolian's son was taken away, and she was kept prisoner by her father, who struck a deal with the three Horsemen to hide Xiaolian from Death. Death's son was kept in a secret facility, where Ezra began raising him to become the Beast.

Death was informed of his family's death by the Horsemen; enraged, he kills them. The Chosen then injured and left Death to die. Death, however, survives due to the intervention of two Endless Nation witches, Crow and Wolf. A decade later, War, Famine, and Conquest are resurrected at Armistice as 10-year-old children when they realize Death's absence. Feeling betrayed, they determine to accomplish their mission without him. Death, on the other hand, seeks revenge on The Chosen for the presumed death of his wife and son. Here begins the story of East of West #1.

Death begins his quest at a bar called the Atlas, accompanied by Crow and Wolf. There, he interrogates a tracker named Hunter who gives him a list of the Chosens' identities. Death then travels to the Union to kill the first name on the list, the Union president. After he does, the other Horsemen move quickly to appoint a new president of the Union, by killing seven members of the line of succession until they spare Antonia LeVay, choosing her as the next Union president and in addition, welcoming her into the Chosen. After the Chosen meet to discuss this new turn of events, Chosen member Archibald Chamberlain, chief of staff of the Confederacy, returns home to discover Death waiting for him. He is successfully able to bargain for his life by revealing to Death that Xiaolian and his son are alive. With this new information, Death, Crow, and Wolf storm New Shanghai, the capitol of the PRA, where Xiaolian is being held. The trio kill many PRA soldiers and amidst the violence, Xiaolian kills her father and her sister. In the aftermath of the battle, she is crowned the new premier of the PRA. Although still angered by the events that lead up to this, Xiaolian accepts Death's mission after he informs her their son is alive, making him promise to find him and bring him back. Meanwhile the other members of the Chosen face personal difficulties in their respective nations and amongst each other. Chosen member Bel Solomon, the governor of the Republic of Texas, betrays the Chosen by deciding to help stop the apocalypse. To this end, after narrowly escaping an assassination attempt by the other Chosen, he recruits the Ranger, a former Texan vigilante to kill the other members of the Chosen. The Ranger makes Bel a promise that he will kill him last. LeVay is tasked by the Horsemen to maintain order in the Union in preparation of the coming apocalypse. However, despite the aid of her chief of staff, Doma Lux, she faces difficulty thanks to an ongoing rebellion and a financial crisis. In the Kingdom, Chosen member Prince John Freeman I faces pressure from his father, the king, who tasks him with helping the Union with their financial issues as part of a plan to put them in debt for future exploitation.

Death and his companions travel to the Spire prison which holds The Oracle of Taconia, a supernatural being who can see the future. Years ago, Death and the other horsemen captured and imprisoned her in the Spire while also taking her eyes. Death speaks to the Oracle about the location of his son and after she takes one of his eyes as a price for information, she points him to Endless Nation shaman Cheveyo, another member of the Chosen, who knows the location. Death leaves but not before the Oracle cryptically informs him that one day soon he will return to set her free. Death, Wolf, and Crow confront Cheveyo in the Dead Lands of the Endless Nation where it is revealed Wolf is Cheveyo's son. The three battle to subdue Cheveyo, who during the battle transforms into a demonic beast, as he is a decamorph. After a pitched battle, in which Wolf slices Cheveyo's demon form with his own horn, the three interrogate a beaten Cheveyo who before he can reveal the location of Death's son, is shot and killed by the Ranger with an impossibly long sniper shot.

Cheveyo's spirit possesses Bel's mind sharing his body with him. The leaders of several nations including Bel meet at a neutral location after being summoned by Xiaolian. During the meeting, Lux secretly detonates an explosive inside a member of the union delegation. Then shortly after, Bel under the influence of Cheveyo, kills a member of the Endless Nation. This escalates hostilities between the nations with the Endless nation declaring war on the Republic of Texas. Meanwhile, at the same time, Death and the Ranger fight but ultimately call a truce after Death explains his reasoning for hunting the Chosen. The Ranger agrees to help Death find his son. In the midst of all of these events, Chamberlain becomes the new president of the Confederacy after having assassinated the previous president during the meeting of nations after taking advantage of the chaos caused by Lux's bomb.

With the help of the Ranger, Death nears his son's location, however, unbeknownst to him, the Horsemen have already arrived there, intending to kill Death's son.

== World ==
=== The Seven Nations ===
==== The Union ====
Officially the United States of America, The Union was formally founded in 1910 and seems to have largely kept the original government structure. It comprises roughly 15 states, including Maine, New York, Maryland, Virginia, Ohio, Pennsylvania, and Kentucky. Roughly half of Kentucky is within Endless Nation territory, and West Virginia appears to be fractured between multiple smaller states and partly incorporated into Ohio. It shares its southern border with the Confederacy, and its western border is in constant dispute with the Endless Nation. Its capital remains Washington, D.C.

==== The Confederacy ====
Officially the Confederate States of America, The Confederacy was formally founded in 1910 after the Civil War. Like the Union, it has a presidential rulership system, though it is not a democracy but rather an oligarchy ruled by a council. It comprises roughly 10 states, including Carolina, Tennessee, Florida, Georgia, Alabama, and Grand Bahama; South Carolina is either fully incorporated into North Carolina or shrunken, four microstates are unidentified, and it is unclear whether the Confederacy owns the entire Bahamas or only the northern island. It shares its northern border with the Union, and its western border is in constant disputes with the Kingdom. Its capital is Savannah.

==== Texas ====
Officially the Republic of the United States of Texas, Texas was formally founded in 1910 after the Civil War. Unlike the Union and the Confederacy, Texas is ruled by a governor, who is elected democratically. It consists of at least 12 unnamed states, and shares its borders with Armistice and the Endless Nation to the north, the Kingdom to the east, and the PRA to the west. Its capital is Austin. After the war, it remains a protectorate state of the Endless Nation.

==== The Nation ====
Officially the Nation of the American Endless, The Nation is more commonly called the Endless Nation and was formally founded in 1943. An incredibly secretive ethnostate ruled by Native Americans (majority Lakota), the Nation's internal structure is completely unknown to the outside world. It is ruled by a Chief of Chiefs, and its capital is the Machine City located in real world North Dakota. Its territory includes the real states of North and South Dakota, Nebraska, Minnesota, Montana, and Iowa. It shares a stable border with Armistice, but does not have definitive borders with any other nation. It is the most technologically advanced nation in America, and possibly the world.

==== The Kingdom ====
Officially the Kingdom of New Orleans, The Kingdom was formally founded in 1941. Descended from former slaves who won their independence during the Civil War and became rich through oil mining, the Kingdom is an absolute monarchy ruled by a line of men all bearing the name John Freeman. Its territory of the real world states of Louisiana, Arkansas, Mississippi, and parts of Missouri. It shares its northern border with Armistice, and uneasy borders with Texas and the Confederacy on either side. Its capital is the city of New Orleans.

==== Armistice ====
Officially the Temple of the Message, Armistice is a massive circular crater located in Kansas. Initially a place of extreme religious importance, immense walls have since been built around it to keep pilgrims out, while a large tower-like temple has been built in the center, serving as the base of operations for the Chosen and the Horsemen of the Apocalypse. It is bordered by the Nation, the Kingdom, and Texas.

==== The PRA ====
Officially the People's Republic of America, The PRA was formally founded in 1928 by Chinese Chairman Mao Zedong, who was exiled from China and filibustered much of real world California. A single-party socialist state, it covers the entire western coast of the real USA, and consists of 14 provinces or states. Its capital is New Shanghai, located roughly where real world Los Angeles is. It shares its eastern border with Texas and the Endless Nation.

== Characters ==
=== The Horsemen ===
The Horsemen of the Apocalypse are the physical embodiments of death, war, famine and conquest. While they appear human, their skin is uniquely colored (black/white, red, green and blue) and their true forms are monstrous and immensely large. They can only be injured by their own weapons, regenerating all other injuries instantaneously; These weapons known to exist include Death's revolver and dagger, War's fiery longsword, Famine's double-bladed sword, and Conquest's duel electric whips and broadsword. Only Death's revolver and War's sword are shown to be in their owner's possession after 2064. After death, the Horsemen resurrect as young children with inverted sex. While the Horsemen appear in America only after the Word is written, they have existed in the old world for a very long time, as far back as the Roman Empire.

- Death: The former leader of the Horsemen of the Apocalypse, the traitor who fell in love with the heiress of the PRA, and was betrayed by his fellow horsemen and their Chosen. Ten years before the events of the series, Death's skin is coal black; After he is left for dead and healed by Wolf and Crow, his skin and hair appear bone white. Of the Horsemen, his preferred weapon is a revolver.
- War: The new leader of the Horsemen after Death's apparent betrayal. War was originally a woman with blood red skin; After her resurrection, she returned as a ten year old boy. While Famine and Conquest enjoy the transition, War is shown some extent of body dysmorphia and voices a preference for his female body. She is the former lover of Death. Of the Horsemen, her/his preferred weapon is a fiery longsword.
- Famine: One of the Horsemen of the Apocalypse, and the most inhuman of the four. Famine was originally a man with sickly green skin and a skeletal face; After his resurrection, he returned as a ten year old girl, keeping the skeletal face. He/she is the only Horseman apparently not afraid of Death to some extent, and is the first to confront him in both battles between him and the Horsemen. Famine is the only Horseman shown to use magic.
- Conquest: One of the Horsemen of the Apocalypse, and the most humanized of the four. Conquest was originally a woman with electric blue skin and a skeletal face; After her resurrection, she returned as a ten year old boy, without the skeletal face. Of the Horsemen, her preferred weapon is a pair of electric whips. Prior to the events of the series, Conquest adopted a human baby at Armistice, raising him as Ezra Orion. It is implied that Conquest has made a habit of raising sons throughout history.

=== The Chosen ===
- Andrew Archibald Chamberlain: Chief of Staff of the Confederate States of America, who later becomes the president. He is a cunning and ambitious man in his early sixties, who was a well-skilled gunslinger in his youth. Chamberlain initially joins the Chosen for his belief in the cause, but decides that he would rather continue to enjoy the luxuries of his life. He keeps one of the Oracle's eyes in a box, and later uses it to wield his revolver with superhuman accuracy.
- Antonia LeVay: President of the United States of America, appointed by the Horsemen after Death kills the former president out of revenge. She is a shrewd and pious woman in her late fifties, who struggles to handle her position of leadership, causing civil unrest and bankruptcy in the Union.
- Bel Solomon: Governor of the Republic of Texas, he is a former lawyer who came into power during a mass reform of Texas' legal system under a group of Ranger vigilantes, the leader of which Solomon once helped in a court case. Solomon is openly a skeptic amongst the group, who attempts to conspire with Chamberlain to prevent the Chosen's mission. After he is discovered he leaves the group, and is later possessed by the soul of Cheveyo.
- Cheveyo: The most important shaman of the Endless Nation, who was cast out of his society. He is the father of Wolf and the former tutor of John Freeman. After he is assassinated by the Ranger under commission by Bel Solomon, Cheveyo's body becomes possessed by a spirit and his own soul possesses Solomon.
- Ezra Orion: Premier of Armistice and adopted son of Conquest, who acts as the leader of the Chosen and the Keeper of the Word. Following Bel Solomon's betrayal of the group and Armistice's destruction during the war, he becomes fused with a creature summoned from the abyss, and becomes the living embodiment of the Word.
- Prince John Freeman I: The young king-to-be of the Kingdom of New Orleans and an expert gunslinger, a skill that that protected him from his numerous brothers jockeying for the throne. He is the former student of Cheveyo and the blood brother of Wolf.
- Mao Hu: The Security Minister of the People's Republic of America, and the younger sister of Xiaolian, whom she sold out to the Horsemen ten years before the series. She is among the most pious and loyal of the Chosen.

=== Primary Allies ===
- Doma Lux: LeVay's gothic chief of staff and right hand, secretly a widowmaker of the PRA. She orchestrates the war between the seven nations and serves as a spy for Xiaolian. She is a lesbian, with a widowmaker lover.
- Crow: A witch of the Endless Nation who saved Death's life ten years ago. She has pitch black skin and the ability to shapeshift into a pack of crows, being implied to be a spirit. She is the lover of Wolf, and Death's companion in his quest.
- Balloon: The floating AI attached to Babylon's eyes, causing the boy to perceive the world falsely through virtual reality. Balloon served as a teaching device to prepare Babylon for being the Beast of the Apocalypse, though defected and aided Babylon in escaping his captors.
- Buer: The pale, gargantuan monster from the abyss, summoned by Ezra Orion to deduce which of the Chosen is the traitor. When Bel Solomon shoots it in Orion's hand, the two become fused together, and Buer becomes a loyal ally to Orion, and later Wolf. He speaks crudely in latin, and acts like a pet with Babylon, playing with him happily.
- Hunter: A one-eyed member of a clan of international trackers, who helped the Horsemen and the Chosen locate Death and Xiaolian ten years ago. He is a "pathfinder", making him the holder of the entire tracker clan database, and a useful asset to both Death and the Horsemen. He keeps one of the Oracle's eyes in his right socket, which speaks in riddles.
- Oracle: A blind and monstrous-looking woman whose magical eyes were removed by the Horsemen many years ago, one given to the Hunter and the other to Chamberlain. Imprisoned beneath a sentient lake in the PRA, she offers Death knowledge in exchange for his eyes, after obtaining each she becomes beautiful and young again.
- Ranger: A Texas lawman who installed himself as the judge, jury, and executioner of the Republic for a period of time after his wife and child's murderer was allowed to walk free after bribing the judge. Hired by Solomon to assassinate the Chosen, the Ranger agrees to the job, promising Solomon that he will kill him last.
- Wolf: A witch of the Endless Nation who saved Death's life ten years ago. He has pale white skin and the ability to shapeshift into a pack of wolves. The son of Cheveyo and the lover of Crow, he is Death's companion in his quest, later becoming the living embodiment of the Word and the Chief of Chiefs when the Endless Nation's leader, Narsimha, perishes.
- Mao Xiaolian: The daughter of Mao Zedong V, she becomes the Premier of the PRA after she kills her father and sister. Ten years before the events of the series, Xiaolian fell in love with Death and the two of them had a child, Babylon. After she was sold out by her sister, Hu, the Horsemen cut off her hands and stole her child, her father keeping her in a lotus garden for the next ten years as a prisoner.

Vizier
The lover of John Freeman I and loyal advisor of the king.

=== Other characters ===
- Constance: The niece of Chamberlain, and a close advisor to him when he becomes President of the Confederacy.
- King John Freeman III: The King of New Orleans and father of John Freeman I and his many brothers. He is disinterested in his eldest son's religion and attempts to mold him into being a proper successor.
- Mao Zedong V: The Premier of the People's Republic of America and the father of Xiaolian and Hu. He bargains with the Horsemen to keep Xiaolian safe in a garden prison for ten years, and he is killed mercifully by her when Death returns to free her.

== Reception ==
The first issue of East of West sold out in the week of its release. Newsarama's David Pepose wrote that knowing where the story is going "can be a challenge", but that "with sharp art and strong dialogue, this first issue has a lot going for it". Greg McElhatton of Comic Book Resources said, "Hickman and Dragotta are clearly telling an epic story, and it feels so rich and textured that it's hard to not want to see more. The comic is off to an extremely strong start". Reviews of the first five issues by IGN have received ratings ranging from 7.0 to 9.0 out of 10. J.C. Maçek III of PopMatters said after reading issue #2, "there is enough potential in both substance and style to give East of West a shot… with both barrels." In a review of the fifth issue, The A.V. Club's Oliver Sava said, "this conclusion to the first arc solidifies the emotional stakes of the story while setting a clear path for the future." McElhatton wrote that the eighth issue "is another strong installment in a series that deserves even more attention than it's already received." The first trade paperback collection, The Promise, topped the Diamond Comic Distributors sales charts in September. It was chosen as one of Digital Spy's top ten comics of 2013.

By 2024, East of West has sold 1.5 million copies.

=== Accolades and nominations ===
Year	Award	Category	Result	Ref.
2013	Diamond Gem Awards	Best New Comic Book Series	Won	
2014	Eisner Award	Best Continuing Series	Nominated	

== TV series ==
On April 19, 2018, it was announced that Amazon Studios, Skybound Entertainment, and Hickman would be developing an hour long series based on the property (along with "Transhuman").

At SDCC in 2019 Hickman revealed East of West is no longer in development at Amazon Prime Video.

== Collected editions ==
Title	Material collected	Publication date	ISBN
East of West, Volume 1: The Promise	East of West #1–5	September 2013	978-1607067702
East of West, Volume 2: We Are All One	East of West #6–10	April 2014	978-1607068556
East of West, Volume 3: There Is No Us	East of West #11–15	September 2014	978-1632151148
East of West, Volume 4: Who Wants War?	East of West #16–19 + The World	June 2015	978-1632153814
East of West: The Apocalypse: Year One	East of West #1–15 + The World (Part 1)	July 2015	978-1632154309
East of West, Volume 5: All These Secrets	East of West #20–24	March 2016	978-1632156808
East of West, Volume 6	East of West #25–29	November 2016	978-1632158796
East of West: The Apocalypse: Year Two	East of West #16–29 + The World (Part 2)	March 2017	978-1534300590
East of West, Volume 7	East of West #30–34	September 13, 2017	978-1534302143
East of West, Volume 8	East of West #35–38	August 14, 2018	978-1534305564
East of West, Volume 9	East of West #39–42	May 28, 2019	978-1534308633
East of West, Volume 10	East of West #43–45	July 22, 2020	978-1534313422
East of West: The Apocalypse: Year Three	East of West #30–45	November 2020	978-1534314993
East of West: The End Times Compendium	East of West #1–45	March 12, 2025	978-1534328297
