= The Manhattan Projects =

Comic book series

Publication information
- Publisher: Image Comics
- Schedule: Monthly
- Format: Ongoing series
- Genre: science fiction
- Publication date: 2012–2015
- No. of issues: 25

Creative team
- Created by: Jonathan Hickman; Nick Pitarra
- Written by: Jonathan Hickman
- Artist(s): Nick Pitarra; Ryan Browne
- Letterer: Rus Wooton
- Colorist(s): Cris Peter; Rachelle Rosenberg; Jordie Bellaire

The Manhattan Projects is a science fiction comic book series co-created by writer Jonathan Hickman and artist Nick Pitarra published by Image Comics. The premise is an alternate history near the end of World War II in which the Manhattan Project was a front for other more esoteric science fiction ideas. The series is a monthly ongoing and began in March 2012 to much critical acclaim.

The series was relaunched as Manhattan Projects: The Sun Beyond the Stars on 11 March 2015.

== Characters ==
- Joseph Oppenheimer, an American physicist with fractured personalities; Robert Oppenheimer's evil, psychopathic twin brother. He can gain knowledge from an individual after eating them, as he did with his brother. In his mindscape, an ongoing civil war occurs between Robert and Joseph's personality as well as their respective armies of personality analogues. Although cooperative at first and spearheading three major projects, he would later betray the team for his personal goals before being killed.
- Albert Einstein, a German physicist. After encountering his alternate-reality self, he was forcibly displaced to the alternate dimension. Using his intelligence to travel through and survive alternate worlds, he finally returns to his original reality as a barbarian. He would later kill Oppenheimer and start an expedition across alternate worlds through his portal.
- Albrecht Einstein, the alcoholic alternate reality version, posing as the original Albert Einstein after switching places. He would later join Albert Einstein's expedition.
- Richard Feynman, a somewhat narcissistic American theoretical physicist. He helped activate Einstein's portal and would also join Albert Einstein's expedition.
- Enrico Fermi, an extra-terrestrial disguised as an Italian physicist. Although cooperative at first, it was revealed that he attempted to kill Daghlian and sabotage the Project from the beginning, only to be killed and experimented on by Einstein.
- William Westmoreland, a US Army general and a sadist. He is tasked by John F. Kennedy to terminate the Manhattan Projects before conspiring with Groves and Johnson. He would later assassinate Kennedy and frame it on Lee Harvey Oswald.
- Harry Daghlian, an irradiated American physicist; later dubbed the "Atomic Messiah". The "Demon core" incident left him a sentient, extremely radioactive skeleton.
- Wernher von Braun, a German rocket scientist with robotic prosthetic limbs.
- Leslie Groves, a no-nonsense US Army general and director of the Manhattan Projects. He ordered the Hiroshima and Nagasaki atomic bombings and was the reason for Manhattan Projects' continuation. He would later conspire with Westmoreland and Johnson.
- FDR: A.I., the artificial intelligence of the deceased American president, Franklin D. Roosevelt.
- Lyndon B. Johnson, the 36th President of the United States of America and conspirator of Kennedy's assassination.
- Harry S. Truman, the 33rd President of the United States of America, a Freemason cultist, and leader of the Illuminatorium.
- Yuri Gagarin, a Russian cosmonaut and national hero of the Soviet Union. After escaping the attack on Star City, he and von Braun decides to explore space in hopes of finding Laika.
- Laika, a Russian talking space dog and Gagarin's close companion.
- Helmutt Gröttrup, a German rocket scientist and engineer. He was made the Project's slave for his cowardice.
- Dmitriy Ustinov, a 'brain-in-a-jar' android and the Soviet Minister of Defence.
- John F. Kennedy, the 35th President of the United States of America. He is a drug-addict who ordered the termination of the Manhattan Projects, regarding them as conspiring with the enemy before being assassinated.
- Leonid Brezhnev, the Soviet General Secretary who was mutated by the alien matter retrieved from the Tunguska event. He alongside his team was tasked by the Soviet government to terminate Star City and those involved in it for conspiring with the enemy.
- Che Guevara, an Argentine revolutionary, military strategist, and diplomat. He was captured by Brezhnev's team, craniotomized, and eventually mind-controlled by the Soviets.
- Fidel Castro, a Cuban revolutionary and politician. He was also captured by Brezhnev's team, craniotomized, and eventually mind-controlled by the Soviets.

== Collected editions ==
The Manhattan Projects has been collected into the following trade paperbacks:

Title	Material collected	ISBN	Story
Vol. 1: Science. Bad.	The Manhattan Projects #1–5	ISBN 978-1-607066-08-8	In 1942, US Army lieutenant general Leslie Groves hires Robert Oppenheimer (who is secretly Oppenheimer's psychopathic twin brother Joseph) to work at the top-secret Manhattan Project to help develop a mass destruction weapon for the U.S. government. Joseph meets scientists Richard Feynman, Enrico Fermi, Harry Daghlian, and Albert Einstein. After their laboratory in the War Department is invaded by Japanese robots through a torii, president Franklin Roosevelt dies suddenly and is resurrected as an Artificial Intelligence, with Harry S. Truman replacing his office. Wernher von Braun betrays the Nazis and joins the project after his fortress was surrounded. Einstein, with the help of Feynman, successfully assembled an interdimensional portal. After the periodic meeting with the Project and the Soviet Union's alien contact gone wrong, Oppenheimer kills their leader and eats its brains to gain knowledge of space travel. After the atomic bomb is successfully constructed, the Enola Gay bombs Hiroshima and Nagasaki, defying Truman's orders and resulting in Japan's surrender.
Vol. 2: They Rule	The Manhattan Projects #6–10	ISBN 978-1-607067-26-9	Following the projects' success with the atomic bomb, and the end of the Second World War, the projects begin to turn their attentions towards advancing the human race. They ally with Soviet Union's Star City, namely Minister Dmitry Ustinov, cosmonaut Yuri Gagarin and his dog Laika, without the knowledge of their respective governments. This catches the attention of the Illuminatorium, the secret society of leaders led by Truman. The Illuminatorium deemed the Manhattan Projects as a threat and decides to attack with the help of their intel, F.D.R. AI. After suffering losses, the Project manages to finish off the Illuminatorium.
Vol. 3: Building	The Manhattan Projects #11–15	ISBN 978-1-607067-53-5	This volume details the first half of Oppenheimer's master plan. With the Illuminati now destroyed save for the F.D.R. AI, a simple question looms over the scientists of The Manhattan Projects: how are they going to govern the world? The Projects are split into three divisions with their own goals: Project Ares will deal with space exploration and colonization, Project Vulcan will deal with the accumulation of renewable energy sources and Project Gaia will deal with perfecting the human condition. All of the projects are to be controlled by Oppenheimer's secret project, Project Charon, to gain knowledge and control throughout creation.
Vol. 4: The Four Disciplines	The Manhattan Projects #16–20	ISBN 978-1-607069-61-4	Oppenheimer aims to gain control of all the projects by imprisoning the leaders of the various projects and torturing the information out of them. The result of Project Gaia, an alien-human hybrid, is killed by general William Westmoreland. Oppenheimer recruits Albrecht to finish Project Charon. Robert and his blue alternates wage war for the control of Joseph's mind, eventually winning, resulting in Project Charon's failure. However, at that moment, Albert emerges from the gateway and kills Joseph. Albert and Albrecht reconcile and alongside Feynman, set off for parts unknown.
Vol. 5: The Cold War	The Manhattan Projects #21–25	ISBN 978-1-63215-184-1	"The Cold War" reveals the dark days of the 'real' Cuban Missile Crisis, Grove, Westmoreland, and Lyndon B. Johnson's real scheme to assassinate president John F. Kennedy, and the end of the Manhattan Projects-Star City alliance.
Vol. 6: The Sun Beyond the Stars	The Manhattan Projects: The Sun Beyond the Stars #1–4	ISBN 978-1632156280	Yuri Gagarin continues his quest to find Laika. After encountering each other, two of them alongside their allies embark on adventures while being lost in space.

The Manhattan Projects has been collected into the following hardcover collections:

Title	Material collected	ISBN
The Manhattan Projects Vol. 1 HC	The Manhattan Projects #1–10	ISBN 978-1632151155
The Manhattan Projects Vol. 2 HC	The Manhattan Projects #11–20	ISBN 978-1632157430
