= The Fox Sister (webcomic) =

Webcomic

- Author: Christina Strain
- Illustrator: Jayd Aït-Kaci
- Website: http://www.thefoxsister.com/
- Launch date: October 2011
- Genre: Supernatural horror

The Fox Sister is a supernatural horror webcomic written by Christina Strain and drawn by Jayd Aït-Kaci. The webcomic began in October 2011, updating once a week, before going on indefinite hiatus. Set in 1968 Seoul, The Fox Sister is inspired by the Korean folk tale The Fox Sister. Its first chapter was self-published by the creators in the form of a hardcover graphic novel in 2014.

== Content ==
Set in Seoul in 1968, the comic is inspired by the Korean folk tale The Fox Sister, which involves a nine-tailed fox demon (kumiho) killing people and eating their livers in order to become human. The story follows Cho Yun-Hee, a priestess (mudang) of Korean shamanism, whose family was killed years ago by a kumiho, trying to find the killer – now wearing Yun-Hee's dead sister's body – with the aid of Alex, an American military veteran and Christian missionary.

== Development ==
Before starting The Fox Sister, Christina Strain had eight years of experience as a colorist. She had scripted a few comics before starting on her webcomic with Jayd Aït-Kaci, and she had picked up some knowledge regarding story structure and pacing by reading other people's scripts during her career, but she did not have much experience writing herself. Initially, Strain intended to stick to art and do something with 3D graphics, but after following a comics writing class, she realized she was very interested in writing stories. After starting The Fox Sister, Strain decided to switch to writing permanently, noting that her background as an artist helps her in visualizing her scenes.

In an interview with Newsarama, Strain stated that she had admired Aït-Kaci's art before the two met, and when a friend brought her in contact with her, Strain started pitching various story ideas to her. The Fox Sister was the one Aït-Kaci liked the most, and Strain went on to tailor the idea to further fit Aït-Kaci's style and taste. Strain had planned from the start to release The Fox Sister as a webcomic, while releasing it later as a 9x12 inch hardcover comic book. She described webcomics as "the easiest way to publish and ... the best way to advertise the book." The Fox Sister was originally updated once a week and was expected to run for four issues, each being 36 pages long. As of November 2017, the comic was on hiatus; the most recently published page is Chapter 4, Page 17.

== Reception ==
Aït-Kaci and Strain won a Joe Shuster Award in the "Webcomic Creator" category in 2014 for their work on The Fox Sister. Lauren Davis of io9 described The Fox Sister as the most "beautifully colored comic [she's] ever seen" and praised the deeper themes in its story. Janelle Asselin, writing for ComicsAlliance, similarly described the webcomic as beautiful, noting that the visual aesthetics hold up well in print.
