= Imperial (2025 comic book) =

2025 American comic book limited series

Publication information
- Publisher: Marvel Comics
- Format: Limited series
- Genre: Science fiction Superhero
- Publication date: June 4 – October 29, 2025
- No. of issues: 4
- Main characters: Hulk; She-Hulk; Brawn; Black Panther; Star Lord; Nova; Shuri; Shia'ar Imperial Guard; Hulkling; Wiccan; Kree/Skrull Empire; Shi'ar Empire; Spartoi Empire; Intergalactic Empire of Wakanda

Creative team
- Written by: Jonathan Hickman
- Penciller(s): Iban Coello; Federico Vicentini
- Colorist: Federico Blee

Imperial is an American science fiction/space opera comic book limited series written by Jonathan Hickman and drawn by Federico Vicentini and Iban Coello, and was published by Marvel Comics on June 4, 2025.

== Publication history ==
Imperial is a comic book limited series written by Marvel Comics long-time writer Jonathan Hickman, and drawn by Stormbreakers artists Federico Vicentini and Iban Coello, and is set in the Marvel Universe, detailing the "Marvel Cosmic" set of concepts and characters.

Featured characters will include Hulk, She-Hulk, Brawn, Black Panther, Nova, Star-Lord, among others.

== Plot summary ==
=== Background ===
During the "X-Manhunt" event, Professor X retires from the X-Men after escaping from Graymalkin Prison in order to resurrect his wife Lilandra Neramani and save their daughter Xandra, who is on the run from the Shi'ar.

=== Main story ===
Two mysterious players sit at a table and move pieces in a game of Sharrat, as they discuss the opening moves of a larger contest. Somewhere in the galaxy, Bruce Banner, Jennifer Walters, and Brawn travel to planet Sakaar en Nevo upon learning that Hulk's son Hiro-Kala was murdered. Upon arriving at Sakaar, the Hulks find that Hiro-Kala was poisoned. By the customs of Sakaar En Nevo, Hiro-Kala's marriages have been annulled, launching his wives and their families into competition for the throne. Demanding to seek answers, the Hulks go to the Galactic Council's forensic scientists, learning that two specialized poisons worked in tandem to slay Hiro-Kala. Inside the Fulcrum City-Station, Peter Quill stands with his father Emperor J'son next to his sister Victoria's body, frozen in cryogenesis to slow the effects of a mystery poison that is being investigated. In the station's lower levels, Quill finds the retired Nova Corps member Richard Rider drinking in a bar filled with intergalactic warriors. Rider asks his old teammate what he wants. J'son discusses the upcoming Council session with other representatives, concerned over the non-committal silence of the Wakandans, whose resources are vital to the production of stargates. Rider and Quill watch retired Imperial Guardsmen duke it out in the arena, as Quill asks Nova to leave retirement and investigate the deaths. He refuses the offer, declining work from Quill's father, who is a criminal. In the room containing the sleeping Victoria, scientists inform her father that while they cannot stop the poisons, they have identified their creators. J'son summons the Galactic Council about the threat of regicide, with five council members mysteriously poisoned. Announcing the deceased and their manner of death, he points the blame at the Kree-Skrull Alliance. Emperor Hulkling and his advisors are completely unaware of the poison's creation. Still, a representative from their Ministry of Science confirms that they were contracted by other Council parties to recreate the poison. Before the scientist can reveal more, a sniper assassin disguised as Wakandan Hatut Zeraze kills the scientists and targets the members of the Council, including J'son. Brawn locates the shooter and sends Hulk, who finds the gunman replete in Wakandan armaments. The sniper throws a grenade, breaking the dome above the meeting chamber and causing the assembly to be pulled into the vacuum of space. He escapes from the immediate area as the Superguardian Oracle states that the stargates are locked down, trapping the assassin in the system, and requests Hulk's help in saving those he can. However, Hulking and his consort are missing. With J'son murdered by the assassin, Quill takes the lead as Spartax regent.

After the incident, the Kree Accusers and Shi'ar Imperial Guards find the evidence tracing back to Wakanda and bullets made of vibranium. Thus, the Galactic Council declares war against Wakanda. The Galactic armada prepares to unleash its attack on Wakandan Prime. The Kree/Skrull forces led by Ronan the Accuser began breaching the vibranium shield. At the same time, the Shi'ar Imperial Guard infiltrated the royal palace and captured Shuri, disguised as Black Panther. With Shuri captured, T'Challa sets his next move with M'Baku to neutralize the armada. A few minutes later, Quill and Rider interrogate Shuri, accusing her people of the assassination plot, before she asks to see their evidence. T'Challa utilizes the planet's shield's weapon function to immobilize the enemy fleet and moves his forces to subdue their attackers. Soon to be boarded, Gladiator uses the K'lyon's still intact communication systems to contact Majestrix Xandra. While she insists that her ship is on the way to offer aid, Gladiator and her guardian, former ruler Deathbird, insist she escape and continue to live even while the Superguardians face death. T'Challa and his Hatut Zeraze board a Rigellian Man-Of-War to fight against the army, where he is confronted with Hulk and Brawn. Shuri exonerates the evidence gathered against Wakanda and deduces that the entire incident is a ruse, and the vibranium bullets used by a sniper are inauthentic. However, the Skrulls, who are heavily loyal to Queen Veranke, began attacking the Galactic Councils within, with Shi'ar rebels led by Superguardian leader Electron plotting a coup against Xandra. Shuri, Rider, and Quill quickly escape the Skrulls and board Quill's ship, Milano III, to the Wakandan Stargate. Shuri realizes their mission is to destroy the gate, and they rush to escape before the device explodes. Gladiator, still unable to contact Xandra and Deathbird, begins to see the danger they are all in as the forces of the Council are trapped in Wakandan airspace. The mysterious player, who is revealed to be the Grandmaster, sits victoriously at the game board.

After bypassing the damaged Stargates to Fulcrum, Quill, Shuri, and Richard Rider decide to travel to the planet Xandar, the capital of the Nova Empire. Before making a warp jump, Quill reports the update to the citizens of Fulcrum City about the current war. Hulking and Wiccan have both survived after an assassin's attack and remain stranded in space until Wiccan realizes he has Nova's contact. Upon arriving at Xandar, Rider reveals that Xandar was left in ruins after suffering from ongoing conflicts and invasions. Rider informs them that the Nova Corp has created the Xandarian Worldmind, an enhanced technological helmet that allows him to gain access to global consciousness and restore his status as Nova. Still, it may come with a cost, both economically and culturally, to Xandar if he removes it. As Nova wears the Worldmind, he manages to reconnect with the system and identify the perpetrator. One year ago, the Grandmaster made an appointment with his contender Maximus on Kal Lak'Thunn. During the play of the game of Sharrat, the Grandmaster informs Maximus that he had observed the innovation between the Global Councils can be instigated into war by allowing the Skrull representatives to create a fatal poison, manipulating D'Ken Neramani's son, Superguardian Electron, to stage a coup against Empress Xandra, encouraging Veranke's followers who oppose the union to sabotage the Kree/Skrull alliance, and framing Wakandans for their valuable resources of vibranium used on weaponry. After destroying the stargate, the Councils will topple one by one before facing their downfall, which allows the Grandmaster to declare victory on winning the game. However, Maximus reveals that the Grandmaster failed to recognize one key player who plays a part in beating the Grandmaster's game: Black Bolt, ruler of the Inhumans. After defeating the Grandmaster, Black Bolt and Maximus teleport away with Lockjaw to restore the Inhuman Empire.

In Fulcrum Space, 12 hours after the Stargate to Wakanda Prime has closed, a fleet of Kree and Shi'ar arrives. Some Accusers fight Kl'rt the Super-Skrull, who is attempting to open the doors. With the controls destroyed, Kl'rt kills the Accuser and claims both their Universal Weapons. In Fulcrum Space, Black Panther, Hulk, and Brawn are informed of the Skrull fleet. At Stargate 234B, the Milano III returns as Peter Quill, Richard Rider, and Shuri arrive at the Fulcrum, where a battle is occurring. At the edge of Fulcrum space, America Chavez tells Hulkling that Wiccan has lost blood and that they need to go now. Outside Fulcrum, Ronan the Accuser accuses Kl'rt of being a traitor to the Kree-Skrull Alliance as Kl'rt pins him with the confiscated Universal Weapons. Hulk, Black Panther, and Brawn defeat Kl'rt as Quill, Rider, and Shuri arrive too late upon meeting Black Bolt, who joins the fray. One week later, Shuri discusses politics with Rider in light of the aftermath and decides to keep the Inhumans' plan a secret. After Shuri storms off, Rider advises Quill that they have to let everyone know that the Inhumans were responsible. Quill states that he is obligated to see this through, which strains his friendship with Rider. Hulk and Brawn receive a message from She-Hulk, asking them to come pick her up and take her back to Earth. On the Attilan City-Ship, Maximus addresses Black Bolt, Medusa, Gorgon, Karnak, Crystal, Lockjaw, and a resurrected Triton about how he helped out as a spymaster. Medusa interprets for Black Bolt, stating to Maximus that he is no longer welcome in the Royal Family in light of his disappearances. Maximus rants about being abandoned, shamed, and exiled in the past, and acknowledges Black Bolt's deception, which he felt proud of. He storms off, stating that Black Bolt will need him again. Two days later, Quill establishes the Galactic Union as part of J'son's vision. The Shi'ar empire has declined membership, the Skrull empire has been rejected membership, and the Kree empire is temporarily abstaining from the union. Victoria is revealed to have survived being poisoned, with her condition having stabilized. Quill takes the throne of Spartax until Victoria recovers.

=== Subplots ===
==== Black Panther ====
After escaping the rampaging Hulk from the Rigellian Vessel, T'Challa receives contact with his armada and learned about the stargates destroyed. T'Challa manages to send a transmission to the Galactic Council to form a truce while informing them about the deception behind the attacks. After the Councils apprehend the Skrulls, T'Challa travels back to Wakanda Prime upon discovering that the command center was secretly sabotaged to stall the Wakandans. With the command center restored, T'Challa orders his people to rebuild the stargate and demand justice for the perpetrators who orchestrated the war.

==== She-Hulk ====
During Hulk's and Brawn's absence, She-Hulk stays on Sakaar and begins investigating the culprit behind Hiro-Kala's murder. After multiple investigations, she deduces that Hiro-Kala's former wives had orchestrated the murder and begins to feel despondent about Sakaar's senseless violence and anarchy. With Hulk and Brawn unable to return, She-Hulk is left stranded on Sakaar.

==== Exiles ====
With Imperial Guards and Xandra captured, Electron reveals himself as D'Ken's son, Ror'ak Neramani, and is determined to claim his birthright as the Majestrix of the Shi'ar empire. Xandra's parents Charles Xavier and Lilandra Neramani arrive to rescue her, with Xavier psychically freezing the civilians and the Superguardians. Xandra decides to spare Electron to prevent the civilians from rebelling against her. Instead, the group decides to leave the Shi'ar throne room under Ror'ak's control and manipulate the Shi'ar Hobgoblin to create a double for its shapeshifting ability, allowing Deathbird to escape to the Stargate. Torn by the coup d'état, Xandra realizes she needs help to restore the throne. Xavier and Lilandra decide to form a renegade group as they travel to the planet Urgoval.

==== Nova ====
As Richard Rider wears the Xandarian Worldmind, he suddenly begins experiencing trauma from his past battle as the Worldmind reconnects the brain-bridge. Rider then enters the virtual construct of his memory after reconnecting. The Worldmind reveals several details behind the war between the Galactic Council, such as framing the Wakandans and manipulating the Skrulls in attacking the Councils. Rider soon discovers that the Inhuman Royal Family is responsible for orchestrating the war. After regaining consciousness from the Worldmind, Rider discusses with Shuri and Quill about the Inhumans' plan on reclaiming the Kree throne after they disappeared a year ago from the massacre. Quill receives contact from Fulcrum, learning that Medusa, Gorgon, and Karnak defeated the Skrulls and claimed themselves as Kree's salvation.

==== Imperial Guardians ====
Nine months before the galactic war, Gamora and Darkhawk went on a mission to track a Skrull impersonating Veranke, who was planning to incite an uprising against the Galactic Councils. With Captain Marvel joining the fray, Darkhawk reveals he has prophetic visions of an event that might spark chaos and massacre. Two months later, Carol departed the duo to rejoin the Avengers and advised them to receive contact for updates. A month later, Gamora and Darkhawk capture the Skrull imposter at planet Uusik, who was actually revealed to be a Chameliod, a Hobgoblin superguardian from the Shi'ar empire. Kl'rt, the Super-Skrull, is well aware of the deception, kills the imposter, and tries to stop them, but Gamora and Darkhawk quickly escape and try to contact the Galactic Councils. However, they were thwarted by Maximus and the Cosmic Ghost Rider to prevent their interference.

== List of issues ==
=== Main series ===
Title	Issues	Writer	Artist(s)	Colorist	Debut date	Conclusion date
Imperial	#1–4	Jonathan Hickman	Federico Vicentini; Iban Coello	Federico Blee	June 4, 2025	October 29, 2025

=== One-shots ===
Title	Featuring	Writer	Artist(s)	Colorist	Release date
Imperial War — Black Panther	Black Panther; Brawn; Hulk	Jonathan Hickman; Victor LaValle	Cafu	David Curiel	August 27, 2025
Imperial War — Planet She-Hulk	She-Hulk	Jonathan Hickman; Stephanie Phillips	Emilio Laiso	Matt Milla	August 27, 2025
Imperial War — Exiles	Lilandra Neramani; Professor X	Jonathan Hickman; Steve Foxe	Francesco Manna	TBA	September 3, 2025
Imperial War — Nova: Centurion	Nova	Jonathan Hickman; Jed MacKay	Matteo Della Fonte	TBA	September 10, 2025
Imperial War — Imperial Guardians	Captain Marvel; Darkhawk; Gamora; Super-Skrull	Jonathan Hickman; Dan Abnett	Cory Smith	TBA	October 1, 2025

=== Tie-in ===
- The Amazing Spider-Man vol. 7 #13

== Reception ==
Comic Book Round Up
Series	Issue	Critic rating	Ref.
Imperial	#1	8.6	
Imperial	#2	8.1	
Imperial	#3	8.1	
Imperial	#4	7.9	
Imperial War	Black Panther	8.5	
Imperial War	Planet She-Hulk	7.6	
Imperial War	Exiles	7.5	
Imperial War	Nova: Centurion	8.9	
Imperial War	Imperial Guardians	8.2	
