= G.O.D.S. =

Comic book series

Publication information
- Publisher: Marvel Comics
- Schedule: Monthly
- Format: Ongoing series
- Genre: Superhero
- Publication date: October 2023–July 2025
- No. of issues: 9
- Main characters: Wyn; Aiko Maki; Dimitri Krakov; Mia DiMaria; The-Powers-That-Be; The-Natural-Order-of-Things; Doctor Strange

Creative team
- Written by: Jonathan Hickman; Ryan North
- Artist(s): Valerio Schiti; Francesco Mortarino

G.O.D.S. is a comic book series written by Jonathan Hickman and drawn by Valerio Schiti. G.O.D.S. involves two abstract entities: The-Powers-That-Be that oversees the magical and weird, and for whom its only Avatar is Reddwyn (Wyn); and The-Natural-Order-of-Things that oversees the science and operates through 100 Centivars. A new stand-alone G.O.D.S. issue written by Ryan North and drawn by Francesco Mortarino, G.O.D.S.: One World Under Doom was published on July 30, 2025.

== Characters ==
- Reddwyn "Wyn": The only Avatar of The-Powers-That-Be.
- Aiko Maki: Wyn's wife. She becomes the 97th Centivar of The-Natural-Order-of-Things, causing a strain on their relationship.
- Dimitri Krakov: Wyn's science-based assistant.
- Mia DiMaria: Aiko's magic-based new recruit.
- The-Powers-That-Be: The cosmic being in charge of the magical and weird.
- The-Natural-Order-of-Things: The cosmic being in charge of the perfectly scientific.
- Doctor Strange: the Sorcerer Supreme.

== Plot ==
The story introduces a new cosmic mythology within the Marvel Universe, focusing on two opposing factions who respectivefully serve The-Powers-That-Be, who represents magic, and The-Natural-Order-of-Things, who represents science. These gods have maintained a delicate truce for millennia, operating in secrecy even from the Marvel heroes.

The central narrative follows Wyn, the immortal Avatar of The-Powers-That-Be, and Aiko Maki, one of the 100 Centivars of The-Natural-Order-of-Things. Once romantically involved, Wyn and Aiko's personal history intertwines with their professional rivalry, adding a layer of complexity to their interactions. Their uneasy truce is tested when Cubisk Core, steals the Staff of the Living Tribunal, a weapon of immense power that threatens to disrupt the fundamental order of reality.

As the crisis escalates, Wyn and Aiko are forced to work together to prevent an impending catastrophe known as the Babylon Event, which could unravel existence itself. Throughout the series, the conflict between science and magic is explored through Hickman's signature world-building and philosophical themes.

== Issues ==
Issue	Publication date	Pages	UPC	Marvel Comics rating system	ISBN
G.O.D.S. #1	October 4, 2023	64 pages	75960620497700111	T+	
G.O.D.S. #2	November 8, 2023	30 pages	75960620497700211		
G.O.D.S. #3	November 13, 2023	27 pages	75960620497700311		
G.O.D.S. #4	January 24, 2024	27 pages	75960620497700411		
G.O.D.S. #5	February 21, 2024	30 pages	75960620497700511		
G.O.D.S. #6	March 27, 2024	28 pages	75960620497700611		
G.O.D.S. #7	April 24, 2024	31 pages	75960620497700711		
G.O.D.S. #8	June 12, 2024	34 pages	75960620497700811		
G.O.D.S.: One World Under Doom #1	July 30, 2025	29 pages	75960621290300111		

Marvel's G.O.D.S. first book volume is published on August 6, 2024, in a 272 pages edition, compiling issues 1 through 8.
