= Jonathan Hickman =

American comic book writer and artist

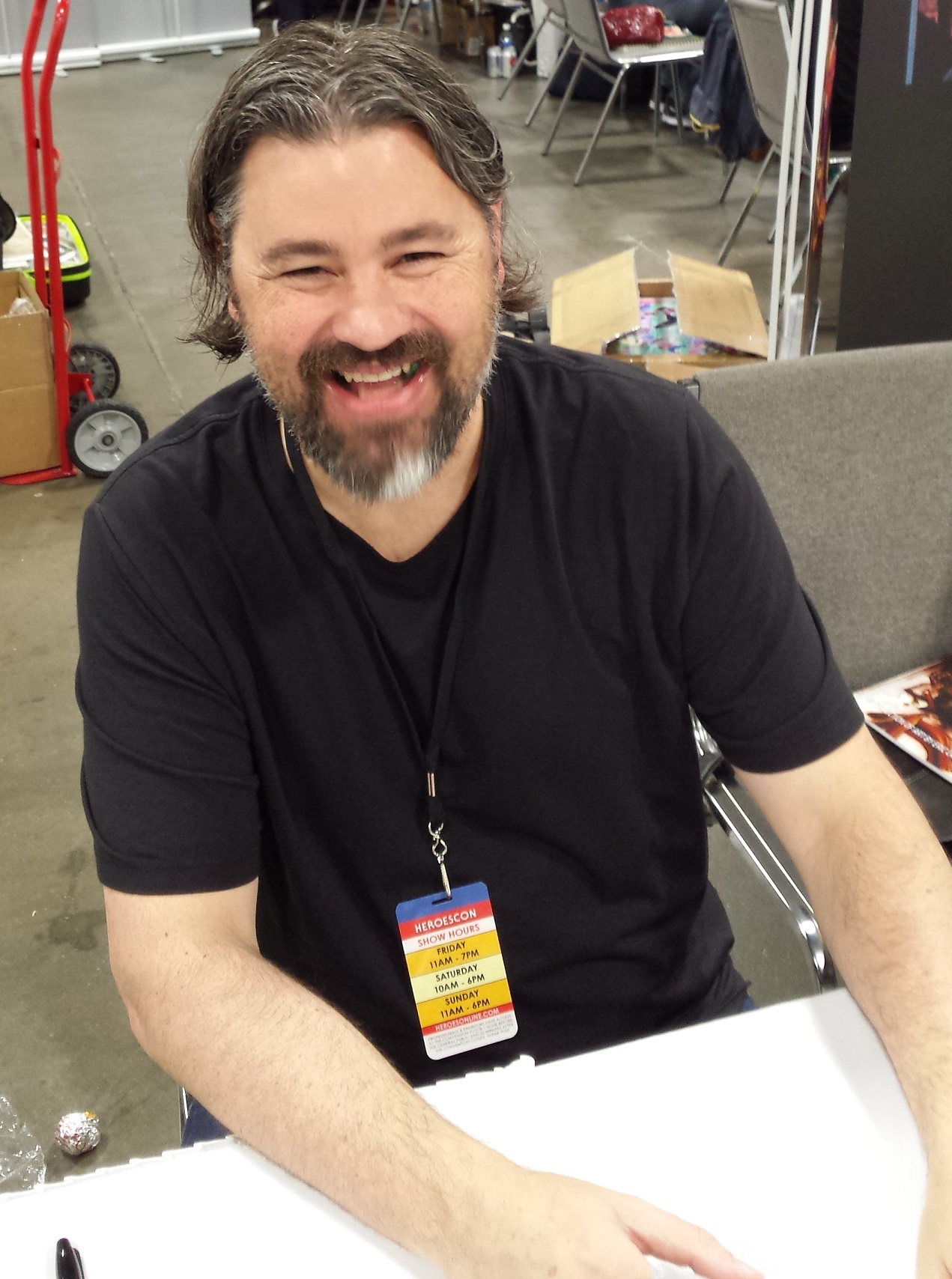
- Jonathan Hickman on June 17, 2017
- Born: South Carolina, U.S.
- Areas: Writer, Penciller, Inker, Letterer, Colourist
- Notable works: The Nightly News; Secret Warriors; S.H.I.E.L.D. Fantastic Four and FF; The Manhattan Projects; The Avengers; New Avengers; East of West; Infinity; Secret Wars; Dawn of X Reign of X Ultimate Invasion; G.O.D.S. Ultimate Spider-Man; Imperial (2025 comic book)
- Awards: Inkpot Award (2019)

Jonathan Hickman is an American comic book writer and artist, best known for his creator-owned series The Nightly News, The Manhattan Projects and East of West, as well as his lengthy stints as a writer on Marvel's Fantastic Four, The Avengers and New Avengers. Hickman's other notable work at Marvel includes the S.H.I.E.L.D. limited series, the creation of the Fantastic Four spin-off title FF, as well as two crossover limited series, Infinity and Secret Wars, both of which acted as centerpieces for the eponymous company-wide crossover storylines.

Between 2019 and 2021, Hickman spearheaded the Dawn of X, a relaunch of various X-Men-related titles for which he provided the core storyline and concepts. This relaunch began the Krakoan Age of which Hickman was the early main architect. This relaunch began with the dual comic book miniseries House of X and Powers of X written by Hickman.

In 2023, Hickman also helped spearhead the relaunch of the Ultimate Universe, beginning with his four-issue miniseries Ultimate Invasion. From 2024 to 2026, Hickman wrote the Ultimate Universe series Ultimate Spider-Man.

As part of his Marvel work, Hickman co-created Black Order, a group of alien warriors who serve the supervillain Thanos, consisting of Ebony Maw, Corvus Glaive, Proxima Midnight, Black Dwarf, and Supergiant.

== Early life ==
Jonathan Hickman was born and raised in South Carolina. He graduated from South Florence High School in Florence, South Carolina. After high school, Hickman earned a degree in architecture from Clemson University.

== Career ==
Before breaking into comics, Hickman worked in the fields of Web and CD-ROM development and later, advertising. Between 2006 and 2008, Hickman published his debut comic book series The Nightly News and Pax Romana, both of which he wrote, drew, colored and lettered, through Image. Soon after, he was invited to write for Marvel, and, in 2009, Hickman launched his first ongoing series Secret Warriors which followed Nick Fury and a group of superpowered operatives as they undertook espionage operations in the wake of the company-wide crossover storyline "Secret Invasion". The following year, Hickman wrote the S.H.I.E.L.D. limited series which detailed the secret history of the eponymous spy organization operating within the Marvel Universe. During this period, he continued to publish various creator-owned projects through Image: Transhuman with artist J. M. Ringuet, A Red Mass for Mars with artist Ryan Bodenheim, and The Red Wing with Nick Pitarra.

In 2009, Hickman began his run on Fantastic Four with the Dark Reign: Fantastic Four limited series, illustrated by Sean Chen, taking over the series proper with issue #570, drawn by Dale Eaglesham. In the storyline "Three", which concluded in Fantastic Four #587, the Human Torch appeared to die stopping a horde of monsters from the other-dimensional Negative Zone. The series ended with the following issue and was relaunched as simply FF. Hickman finished his run on the Fantastic Four and became the writer of The Avengers and New Avengers as part of the Marvel NOW! relaunch in late 2012. Hickman's run on the titles spawned two company-wide crossover storylines, "Infinity" in 2013 and "Secret Wars" in 2015.

After taking a leave from Marvel to focus on his long-form creator-owned titles, Hickman returned to the publisher for "Dawn of X", the 2019 relaunch of the X-Men family of titles, which began with the House of X and Powers of X limited series that laid out the new status quo developed by Hickman that would define the Krakoan Age. He subsequently wrote the core X-Men series while the creators of other titles worked closely under his supervision. Hickman announced his departure from writing X-Men in August 2021.

In August 2021, Hickman was among a group of creators with whom fellow comics writer Nick Spencer formed a deal with the subscription-based newsletter platform Substack to publish creator-owned comics stories, essays, and instructional guides on that platform. Hickman indicated that he would collaborate with artists Mike del Mundo and Mike Huddleston and writer Tini Howard on a new series, Three Worlds / Three Moons, which will give readers a behind-the-scenes look at the process of building a fictional universe.

In February 2023 Hickman wrote the miniseries Ultimate Invasion, with Bryan Hitch doing artwork. The series revolves around the Maker traveling to another universe and influencing its history in his image. Ultimate Invasion led to a brand new line of Ultimate Marvel comics, spearheaded by Hickman. In September 2023, it was revealed that Hickman would write the Ultimate Marvel series Ultimate Spider-Man, with Marco Checchetto serving as artist. Ultimate Spider-Man began publication in 2024.

In March 2023, Hickman worked with artist Valerio Schiti on a brand new series at Marvel, entitled G.O.D.S., which involves a new character named Wyn teaming up with Doctor Strange in order to stop a new threat. Hickman mentioned that he wrote the series bible for G.O.D.S. alongside House of X when he first returned to Marvel.

In April 2024, Hickman and Esad Ribić reunited for the miniseries Aliens vs. Avengers, which pits Earth's mightiest heroes against the Xenomorphs. The first issue debuted in August 2024.

In May 2024, Hickman wrote a new miniseries starring Wolverine which would be drawn by artist Greg Capullo. The miniseries, titled Wolverine: Revenge, debuted on August 24, 2024.

In December 2024, Marvel announced Imperial, a miniseries written by Hickman. In March and April 2025, it was announced that Federico Vicentini and Iban Coello would be the artists for Imperial and that the series would debut on June 4, 2025. The series focuses on several galactic leaders being assassinated, causing a radical reshaping of Marvel's cosmic landscape.

In October 2026, it was revealed through an interview with Bleeding Cool that Hickman has been involved as a creative consultant in several Marvel Cinematic Universe (MCU) films, particularly reviewing the scripts and cuts of Avengers: Doomsday (2026) and Avengers: Secret Wars (2027) throughout their productions.

== Awards and nominations ==
- 2008: Nominated for "Best Limited Series" Eisner Award for The Nightly News.
- 2011: Nominated for "Best Continuing or Limited Series" Harvey Award for Fantastic Four
- 2013: Nominated for "Best Continuing Series" and "Best Writer" Eisner Award for The Manhattan Projects
- 2014: Nominated for "Best Continuing Series" for East of West and "Best Writer" Eisner Award for East of West, The Manhattan Projects, The Avengers, and Infinity
- 2021: Nominated for Best Limited Series for Decorum (shared with Mike Huddleston) and the Best Writer Eisner Award for X-Men, Giant-Size X-Men, and Decorum
- 2023: Nominated for ″Best Short Story″ Eisner Award for Amazing Fantasy #1000 (shared with Marco Checchetto)
- 2025: Nominated for ″Best Continuing Series″ Eisner Award for Ultimate Spider-Man (shared with Marco Checchetto)

== Bibliography ==
=== Image Comics ===
- The Nightly News #1–6 (script and art, 2006–2007) collected as The Nightly News (tpb, 184 pages, 2007, ISBN 1-58240-766-5; hc, 300 pages, 2011, ISBN 1-60706-461-8)
- Popgun Volume 1: "Black Circle White: The Recycle Soul Project" (script and art, anthology graphic novel, 455 pages, 2007, ISBN 1-58240-824-6)
- Pax Romana #1–4 (script and art, 2007–2008) collected as Pax Romana (tpb, 144 pages, 2009, ISBN 1-58240-873-4)
- Transhuman #1–4 (with J. M. Ringuet, 2008) collected as Transhuman (tpb, 120 pages, 2009, ISBN 1-58240-922-6)
- A Red Mass for Mars #1–4 (with Ryan Bodenheim, 2008–2010) collected as A Red Mass for Mars (tpb, 120 pages, 2010, ISBN 1-58240-923-4)
- Pilot Season: The Core (with Kenneth Rocafort, one-shot, Top Cow, 2008) collected in Pilot Season 2008 (tpb, 144 pages, 2009, ISBN 1-60706-043-4)
- Comic Book Tattoo: "1000 Oceans" (script and art, anthology graphic novel, hc, 480 pages, 2008, ISBN 1-58240-965-X; sc, 2008, ISBN 1-58240-964-1)
- The Red Wing #1–4 (with Nick Pitarra, 2011) collected as The Red Wing (tpb, 140 pages, 2011, ISBN 1-60706-479-0)
- Feel Better Now (script and art, unreleased graphic novel — initially announced for October 2011, then delayed to 2012)
- The Manhattan Projects:
  - The Manhattan Projects (with Nick Pitarra and Ryan Browne (#10, 15, 19, 21), 2012–2014) collected as:
    - Science. Bad. (collects #1–5, tpb, 144 pages, 2012, ISBN 1-60706-608-4)
    - They Rule (collects #6–10, tpb, 152 pages, 2013, ISBN 1-60706-726-9)
    - Building (collects #11–15, tpb, 152 pages, 2013, ISBN 1-60706-753-6)
    - The Four Disciplines (collects #16–20, tpb, 144 pages, 2014, ISBN 1-60706-961-X)
    - The Cold War (collects #21–25, tpb, 156 pages, 2015, ISBN 1-63215-184-7)
  - The Manhattan Projects: The Sun Beyond the Stars #1–4 (with Nick Pitarra, 2015–2016) collected as The Manhattan Projects: The Sun Beyond the Stars (tpb, 136 pages, 2016, ISBN 1-63215-628-8)
- Secret #1–7 (with Ryan Bodenheim, 2012–2014) collected as Secret: Never Get Caught (tpb, 200 pages, 2014, ISBN 1-60706-622-X)
- Liberty Annual (script and art, anthology):
  - Liberty Annual '12: "Which Came First?" (2012) collected in CBLDF Presents: Liberty (hc, 216 pages, 2014, ISBN 1-60706-937-7; tpb, 2016, ISBN 1-60706-996-2)
  - Liberty Annual '14: "They Say..." (2014)
- East of West (with Nick Dragotta, 2013–2019) collected as:
  - The Apocalypse: Year One (collects #1–15, hc, 504 pages, 2014, ISBN 1-63215-430-7)
  - The Apocalypse: Year Two (collects #16–29, hc, 424 pages, 2015, ISBN 1-5343-0059-7)
  - The Apocalypse: Year Three (collects #30–45, hc, 512 pages, 2020, ISBN 1-5343-1499-7)
- The Dying and the Dead #1–6 (of 10) (with Ryan Bodenheim, 2015–2017)
  - The series has been solicited through issue #9.
- The Black Monday Murders (with Tomm Coker, 2016–2018) collected as:
  - Volume 1 (collects #1–4, tpb, 240 pages, 2017, ISBN 1-5343-0027-9)
  - Volume 2 (collects #5–8, tpb, 192 pages, 2018, ISBN 1-5343-0372-3)
    - Issues #9 and 10 were solicited for a 2019 release but never came out.
- Frontier (script and art, unreleased ongoing series — initially announced for November 2016)
  - The series has been solicited through issue #4 before the first issue was pulled from schedule.
- Decorum #1–8 (with Mike Huddleston, 2020–2021) collected as Decorum (hc, 400 pages, 2022, ISBN 1-5343-1823-2)

=== Marvel Comics ===
- Legion of Monsters: Satana: "mustDIE/eatSOUL" (script and art, co-feature in one-shot, 2007) collected in Legion of Monsters (hc, 280 pages, 2007, ISBN 0-7851-2754-2)
- Astonishing Tales: Mojoworld #1–6: "Bobby and Sam in Mojoworld" (written by Hickman, art by Hickman and Nick Pitarra, free digital mini-comic, 2008–2009)
  - First published in print as a feature in Astonishing Tales vol. 2 #1–6 (anthology, 2009)
  - Collected in The Avengers by Jonathan Hickman (Omnibus Volume 1, hc, 1,192 pages, 2017, ISBN 1-302-90708-5; The Complete Collection Volume 1, tpb, 336 pages, 2018, ISBN 1-302-92509-1)
- Secret Warriors (with Stefano Caselli, Alessandro Vitti, Gianluca Gugliotta (#16) and Mirko Colak (#20–21); issues #1–6 are co-written by Hickman and Brian Michael Bendis, 2009–2011) collected as:
  - Secret Warriors: The Complete Collection Volume 1 (collects #1–16, tpb, 480 pages, 2015, ISBN 0-7851-9763-X)
    - Includes the "Declaration" short story (co-written by Hickman and Brian Michael Bendis, art by Stefano Caselli) from Dark Reign: New Nation (one-shot, 2009)
    - Includes the Dark Reign: The List—Secret Warriors one-shot (written by Hickman, art by Ed McGuinness, 2009)
  - Secret Warriors: The Complete Collection Volume 2 (collects #17–28, tpb, 352 pages, 2015, ISBN 0-7851-9764-8)
    - Includes the Siege: Secret Warriors one-shot (written by Hickman, art by Alessandro Vitti, 2010)
  - Secret Warriors Omnibus (collects #1–28 and the one-shots, hc, 904 pages, 2012, ISBN 0-7851-6333-6)
- Fantastic Four:
  - Dark Reign: Fantastic Four (tpb, 128 pages, 2009, ISBN 0-7851-3908-7) collects:
    - Dark Reign: Fantastic Four #1–5: "The Bridge" (with Sean Chen, 2009)
    - Dark Reign: The Cabal: "...and I'll Get the Land" (with Adi Granov, anthology one-shot, 2009)
  - Strange Tales vol. 4 #2: "Enlist Today" (script and art, anthology, Marvel Knights, 2009) collected in Strange Tales (hc, 192 pages, 2018, ISBN 0-7851-4626-1; tpb, 2010, ISBN 0-7851-2802-6)
  - Fantastic Four (with Dale Eaglesham, Neil Edwards, Nick Dragotta + Mark Brooks (#588), Steve Epting (#600–601 and 604), Barry Kitson (#602–603), Ron Garney (#605–606), Mike Choi (#605.1), Giuseppe Camuncoli (#607–608), and Ryan Stegman (#609–611), 2009–2012) collected as:
    - Fantastic Four by Jonathan Hickman Volume 1 (collects #570–574, hc, 144 pages, 2010, ISBN 0-7851-4317-3; tpb, 2010, ISBN 0-7851-3688-6)
    - Fantastic Four by Jonathan Hickman Volume 2 (collects #575–578, hc, 112 pages, 2010, ISBN 0-7851-4716-0; tpb, 2010, ISBN 0-7851-4541-9)
    - Fantastic Four by Jonathan Hickman Volume 3 (collects #579–582, hc, 112 pages, 2010, ISBN 0-7851-4717-9; tpb, 2011, ISBN 0-7851-4718-7)
    - Fantastic Four by Jonathan Hickman Volume 4 (collects #583–588, hc, 184 pages, 2011, ISBN 0-7851-4891-4; tpb, 2011, ISBN 0-7851-5143-5)
    - Fantastic Four by Jonathan Hickman Volume 5 (collects #600–604, hc, 208 pages, 2012, ISBN 0-7851-6152-X; tpb, 2013, ISBN 0-7851-6153-8)
    - Fantastic Four by Jonathan Hickman Volume 6 (collects #605–611 and 605.1, hc, 184 pages, 2013, ISBN 0-7851-6154-6; tpb, 2013, ISBN 0-7851-6155-4)
  - FF (with Steve Epting, Barry Kitson, Greg Tocchini (#6–7), Juan Bobillo (#12–14), Nick Dragotta, Gabriel Hernández Walta (#19) and André Lima Araújo (#22), 2011–2012) collected as:
    - FF by Jonathan Hickman Volume 1 (collects #1–5, hc, 136 pages, 2011, ISBN 0-7851-5144-3; tpb, 2012, ISBN 0-7851-5145-1)
    - FF by Jonathan Hickman Volume 2 (collects #6–11, hc, 144 pages, 2012, ISBN 0-7851-5769-7; tpb, 2012, ISBN 0-7851-5770-0)
    - FF by Jonathan Hickman Volume 3 (collects #12–16, hc, 128 pages, 2012, ISBN 0-7851-6312-3; tpb, 2013, ISBN 0-7851-6313-1)
    - FF by Jonathan Hickman Volume 4 (collects #17–23, hc, 168 pages, 2012, ISBN 0-7851-6314-X; tpb, 2013, ISBN 0-7851-6315-8)
  - In all subsequent collected editions, both series are compiled in the original release order (Fantastic Four #570–588 — FF #1–11 — Fantastic Four #600–604 — FF #12–16 — Fantastic Four #605–611 and FF #17–23 alternating between issues):
    - Fantastic Four by Jonathan Hickman Omnibus Volume 1 (collects Dark Reign: Fantastic Four #1–5, Fantastic Four #570–588, FF #1–5 and the short story from the Dark Reign: The Cabal one-shot, hc, 800 pages, 2013, ISBN 0-7851-6566-5)
    - Fantastic Four by Jonathan Hickman Omnibus Volume 2 (collects FF #6–23, Fantastic Four #600–611 and 605.1, hc, 832 pages, 2014, ISBN 0-7851-8900-9)
    - Fantastic Four by Jonathan Hickman: The Complete Collection Volume 1 (collects Dark Reign: Fantastic Four #1–5, Fantastic Four #570–578 and the short story from the Dark Reign: The Cabal one-shot, tpb, 384 pages, 2018, ISBN 1-302-91336-0)
    - Fantastic Four by Jonathan Hickman: The Complete Collection Volume 2 (collects Fantastic Four #579–588 and FF #1–5, tpb, 432 pages, 2019, ISBN 1-302-91963-6)
    - Fantastic Four by Jonathan Hickman: The Complete Collection Volume 3 (collects FF #6–16 and Fantastic Four #600–604, tpb, 480 pages, 2021, ISBN 1-302-92668-3)
    - Fantastic Four by Jonathan Hickman: The Complete Collection Volume 4 (collects FF #17–23 and Fantastic Four #605–611 and 605.1, tpb, 368 pages, 2022, ISBN 1-302-93358-2)
  - Fantastic Four Fanfare #2 (2025)
- Shang-Chi, Master of Kung Fu: Black and White: "The Annual Race to Benefit Various and Sundry Evil Organizations, and Also the Homeless... Now with Beer and Hot Dogs" (with Kody Chamberlain, anthology one-shot, 2009)
  - Collected in The Avengers by Jonathan Hickman (Omnibus Volume 1, hc, 1,192 pages, 2017, ISBN 1-302-90708-5; The Complete Collection Volume 2, tpb, 344 pages, 2019, ISBN 1-302-92530-X)
  - Collected in Deadpool Classic Companion Volume 2 (tpb, 496 pages, 2018, ISBN 1-302-91243-7)
- Breaking into Comics the Marvel Way! #2: "Oh, the Places You'll Go!" (with Gabriel Hernández Walta, anthology, 2010)
- S.H.I.E.L.D. (with Dustin Weaver):
  - S.H.I.E.L.D. #1–6 (2010–2011) collected as S.H.I.E.L.D.: Architects of Forever (hc, 192 pages, 2011, ISBN 0-7851-4894-9; tpb, 2011, ISBN 0-7851-4422-6)
  - S.H.I.E.L.D.: The Human Machine (hc, 192 pages, 2018, ISBN 0-7851-5249-0; tpb, 2019, ISBN 0-7851-5250-4) collects:
    - S.H.I.E.L.D. Infinity (with Nick Pitarra, Zachary Flagg, Kevin Mellon and Gabriel Hernández Walta, one-shot, 2011)
    - S.H.I.E.L.D. vol. 2 #1–4 (2011–2012) and S.H.I.E.L.D. by Hickman and Weaver #5–6 (2018)
- Ultimate Comics:
  - Ultimate Comics: Thor #1–4 (with Carlos Pacheco, 2010–2011) collected as Ultimate Comics: Thor (hc, 112 pages, 2011, ISBN 0-7851-5187-7; tpb, 2011, ISBN 0-7851-5188-5)
  - Ultimate Spider-Man: Death of Spider-Man Fallout (hc, 136 pages, 2011, ISBN 0-7851-5912-6; tpb, 2012, ISBN 0-7851-5913-4) includes:
    - Ultimate Comics: Fallout (anthology):
      - "Thor" (with Bryan Hitch, in #2, 2011)
      - "Tony Stark" (with Steve Kurth) and "The Hulk" (with Carlo Pagulayan, in #3, 2011)
      - "Reed Richards" (with Salvador Larroca, in #4, 2011)
      - "Nick Fury" (with Billy Tan (#5) and Mitch Breitweiser (#6), 2011)
  - Ultimate Comics: The Ultimates (with Esad Ribić, Brandon Peterson (#5–6) and Luke Ross (#10–12), 2011–2012) collected as:
    - Ultimate Comics: The Ultimates by Jonathan Hickman Volume 1 (collects #1–6, hc, 144 pages, 2012, ISBN 0-7851-5717-4; tpb, 2012, ISBN 1-84653-504-2)
    - Ultimate Comics: The Ultimates by Jonathan Hickman Volume 2 (collects #7–12, hc, 144 pages, 2012, ISBN 0-7851-5719-0; tpb, 2013, ISBN 0-7851-5720-4)
      - Issues #10–12 are scripted by Sam Humphries from Hickman's plots.
  - Ultimate Comics: Hawkeye #1–4 (with Rafa Sandoval, 2011) collected as Ultimate Comics: Hawkeye (hc, 112 pages, 2012, ISBN 0-7851-6227-5; tpb, 2012, ISBN 0-7851-5744-1)
- Avengers vs. X-Men #4 (with John Romita, Jr.) and #6 (with Olivier Coipel, 2012) collected in Avengers vs. X-Men (hc, 568 pages, 2012, ISBN 0-7851-6317-4; tpb, 384 pages, 2013, ISBN 0-7851-6318-2)
- The Avengers:
  - The Avengers vol. 5 (with Jerome Opeña (#1–3), Andy Kubert (#4–6), Dustin Weaver (#7–9), Mike Deodato, Jr., Stefano Caselli, Leinil Francis Yu, Esad Ribić (#24), Salvador Larroca (#24–28) and Mike Mayhew (#44), 2013–2015) collected as:
    - Avengers World (collects #1–6, hc, 152 pages, 2013, ISBN 0-7851-6823-0; tpb, 2014, ISBN 0-7851-6652-1)
    - The Last White Event (collects #7–11, hc, 136 pages, 2013, ISBN 0-7851-6824-9; tpb, 2014, ISBN 0-7851-6653-X)
    - Prelude to Infinity (collects #12–17, hc, 152 pages, 2013, ISBN 978-0-7851-6825-6; tpb, 2014, ISBN 0-7851-6654-8)
      - Issues #12–17 are co-written by Hickman and Nick Spencer.
    - Infinity (collects #18–23, hc, 168 pages, 2014, ISBN 0-7851-8414-7; tpb, 2015, ISBN 0-7851-8415-5)
    - Adapt or Die (collects #24–28, hc, 136 pages, 2014, ISBN 0-7851-5477-9; tpb, 2015, ISBN 0-7851-8921-1)
    - Infinite Avengers (collects #29–34, hc, 152 pages, 2014, ISBN 0-7851-5478-7; tpb, 2015, ISBN 0-7851-8922-X)
    - Time Runs Out Volume 1 (includes #35–37, hc, 144 pages, 2015, ISBN 0-7851-9341-3; tpb, 2015, ISBN 0-7851-8923-8)
    - Time Runs Out Volume 2 (includes #38–39, hc, 136 pages, 2015, ISBN 0-7851-9372-3; tpb, 2015, ISBN 0-7851-9373-1)
    - Time Runs Out Volume 3 (includes #40–42, hc, 136 pages, 2015, ISBN 0-7851-9222-0; tpb, 2016, ISBN 0-7851-9223-9)
    - Time Runs Out Volume 4 (includes #43–44, hc, 152 pages, 2015, ISBN 0-7851-9224-7; tpb, 2016, ISBN 0-7851-9225-5)
  - New Avengers vol. 3 (with Steve Epting, Mike Deodato, Jr., Simone Bianchi, Rags Morales (#16–17), Valerio Schiti (#18–21, 24), Kev Walker, Szymon Kudranski (#27) and Mike Perkins (#28), 2013–2015) collected as:
    - Everything Dies (collects #1–6, hc, 144 pages, 2013, ISBN 0-7851-6836-2; tpb, 2014, ISBN 0-7851-6661-0)
    - Infinity (collects #7–12, hc, 152 pages, 2014, ISBN 0-7851-6837-0; tpb, 2014, ISBN 0-7851-6662-9)
    - Other Worlds (collects #13–17, hc, 136 pages, 2014, ISBN 0-7851-5484-1; tpb, 2015, ISBN 0-7851-8959-9)
    - A Perfect World (collects #18–23, hc, 144 pages, 2014, ISBN 0-7851-5485-X; tpb, 2015, ISBN 0-7851-8960-2)
    - Time Runs Out Volume 1 (includes #24–25, hc, 144 pages, 2015, ISBN 0-7851-9341-3; tpb, 2015, ISBN 0-7851-8923-8)
    - Time Runs Out Volume 2 (includes #26–28, hc, 136 pages, 2015, ISBN 0-7851-9372-3; tpb, 2015, ISBN 0-7851-9373-1)
    - Time Runs Out Volume 3 (includes #29–30, hc, 136 pages, 2015, ISBN 0-7851-9222-0; tpb, 2016, ISBN 0-7851-9223-9)
    - Time Runs Out Volume 4 (includes #31–33, hc, 152 pages, 2015, ISBN 0-7851-9224-7; tpb, 2016, ISBN 0-7851-9225-5)
  - Avengers World #1–5 (co-written by Hickman and Nick Spencer, art by Stefano Caselli, 2014) collected as Avengers World: The Complete Collection (tpb, 528 pages, 2019, ISBN 1-302-91617-3)
  - In all subsequent collected editions, the issues of The Avengers vol. 5, The New Avengers vol. 3 and the 6-issue crossover limited series Infinity (see below) are compiled into one continuous story:
    - The Avengers by Jonathan Hickman Omnibus Volume 1 (collects The Avengers vol. 5 #1–23, The New Avengers vol. 3 #1–12 and Infinity #1–6, hc, 1,192 pages, 2017, ISBN 1-302-90708-5)
    - The Avengers by Jonathan Hickman Omnibus Volume 2 (collects The Avengers vol. 5 #24–44 and The New Avengers vol. 3 #13–33, hc, 1,088 pages, 2018, ISBN 1-302-91181-3)
    - The Avengers by Jonathan Hickman: The Complete Collection Volume 1 (collects The Avengers vol. 5 #1–5 and The New Avengers vol. 3 #1–6, tpb, 336 pages, 2018, ISBN 1-302-92509-1)
    - The Avengers by Jonathan Hickman: The Complete Collection Volume 2 (collects The Avengers vol. 5 #6–17 and The New Avengers vol. 3 #7, tpb, 344 pages, 2019, ISBN 1-302-92530-X)
    - The Avengers by Jonathan Hickman: The Complete Collection Volume 3 (collects The Avengers vol. 5 #18–23, The New Avengers vol. 3 #8–12 and Infinity #1–6, tpb, 512 pages, 2021, ISBN 1-302-92647-0)
    - The Avengers by Jonathan Hickman: The Complete Collection Volume 4 (collects The Avengers vol. 5 #24–34 and The New Avengers vol. 3 #13–23, tpb, 528 pages, 2021, ISBN 1-302-92648-9)
    - The Avengers by Jonathan Hickman: The Complete Collection Volume 5 (collects The Avengers vol. 5 #35–44 and The New Avengers vol. 3 #24–33, tpb, 528 pages, 2022, ISBN 1-302-93351-5)
- Infinity #1–6 (with Jim Cheung (#1 and 6), Jerome Opeña and Dustin Weaver, 2013–2014) collected as Infinity (hc, 632 pages, 2014, ISBN 0-7851-8422-8; tpb, 2014, ISBN 0-7851-8423-6)
- Secret Wars (hc, 312 pages, 2016, ISBN 0-7851-9884-9; tpb, 2016, ISBN 0-7851-9895-4) collects:
  - Free Comic Book Day 2015: Secret Wars (with Paul Renaud, one-shot, 2015)
  - Secret Wars #1–9 (with Esad Ribić, 2015–2016)
- Secret Wars Too: "Sraw Terces" (with Brian Churilla, anthology one-shot, 2016) collected in Secret Wars Too (tpb, 208 pages, 2016, ISBN 1-302-90211-3)
- X-Men:
  - House of X/Powers of X (hc, 448 pages, 2019, ISBN 1-302-91570-3; tpb, 2020, ISBN 1-302-91571-1) collects:
    - House of X #1–6 (with Pepe Larraz, 2019)
    - Powers of X #1–6 (with R. B. Silva, 2019)
  - Marvel Comics #1000: "The First Horsemen" (with Dustin Weaver, anthology, 2019) collected in Marvel Comics 1000 (hc, 144 pages, 2020, ISBN 1-302-92137-1)
  - X-Men vol. 5 (with Leinil Francis Yu, R. B. Silva (#5), Matteo Buffagni (#6), Mahmud Asrar (#8, 13–15, 19), Phil Noto (#16), Brett Booth (#17–18) and Francesco Mobili (#20), 2019–2021) collected as:
    - Volume 1 (collects #1–6, tpb, 184 pages, 2020, ISBN 1-302-91981-4)
    - Volume 2 (collects #7–11, tpb, 152 pages, 2020, ISBN 1-302-91982-2)
    - X of Swords (includes #12–15, hc, 720 pages, 2021, ISBN 1-302-92717-5; tpb, 2022, ISBN 1-302-92997-6)
      - Also collects the X of Swords: Creation one-shot (co-written by Hickman and Tini Howard, art by Pepe Larraz, 2020)
      - Also collects the X of Swords: Stasis one-shot (co-written by Hickman and Tini Howard, art by Pepe Larraz and Mahmud Asrar, 2020)
      - Also collects the X of Swords: Destruction one-shot (co-written by Hickman and Tini Howard, art by Pepe Larraz, 2020)
    - Volume 3 (collects #16–20, tpb, 136 pages, 2021, ISBN 1-302-92491-5)
    - Hellfire Gala (includes #21, hc, 400 pages, 2021, ISBN 1-302-93156-3; tpb, 120 pages, 2022, ISBN 1-302-93115-6)
  - New Mutants vol. 4 #1–2, 5, 7 (with Rod Reis, 2019–2020) collected as New Mutants Volume 1 (tpb, 128 pages, 2020, ISBN 1-302-91992-X)
  - Incoming!: "X-Men" (with R. B. Silva, anthology one-shot, 2020) collected in Road to Empyre (tpb, 168 pages, 2020, ISBN 1-302-92588-1)
  - Giant-Size X-Men by Jonathan Hickman Volume 1 (tpb, 184 pages, 2020, ISBN 1-302-92583-0) collects:
    - Giant-Size X-Men: Jean Grey and Emma Frost (with Russell Dauterman, one-shot, 2020)
    - Giant-Size X-Men: Nightcrawler (with Alan Davis, one-shot, 2020)
    - Giant-Size X-Men: Magneto (with Ramón K. Pérez, one-shot, 2020)
    - Giant-Size X-Men: Fantomex (with Rod Reis, one-shot, 2020)
    - Giant-Size X-Men: Storm (with Russell Dauterman, one-shot, 2020)
  - Free Comic Book Day 2020: X-Men (with Pepe Larraz, one-shot, 2020)
  - Empyre: X-Men (tpb, 136 pages, 2020, ISBN 1-302-92575-X) includes:
    - Empyre: X-Men (anthology):
      - "(Alien) Plants vs. (Mutant) Zombies" (co-written by Hickman and Tini Howard, art by Matteo Buffagni, in #1, 2020)
      - "Un-Ring" (with Jorge Molina and Lucas Werneck, in #4, 2020)
  - Infinity Comics: X-Men Unlimited vol. 3 #1–4 (with Declan Shalvey, digital anthology, 2021) published in print as X-Men Unlimited: Latitude (one-shot, May 2022)
  - Inferno #1–4 (with Valerio Schiti, Stefano Caselli (#2) and R. B. Silva (#3), 2021–2022) collected as Inferno (hc, 192 pages, 2022, ISBN 1-302-93281-0; tpb, 2022, ISBN 1-302-93282-9)
- The Amazing Spider-Man: Full Circle: "Part One" (with Chris Bachalo, anthology one-shot, 2019) collected in The Amazing Spider-Man by Nick Spencer Omnibus Volume 1 (hc, 1,328 pages, 2022, ISBN 1-302-94609-9)
- Moon Knight: Black, White and Blood #1: "Anubis Rex" (with Chris Bachalo, anthology, 2022) collected in Moon Knight: Black, White and Blood (Treasury Edition, 136 pages, 2023, ISBN 1-302-94604-8; tpb, 2024, ISBN 1-302-94605-6)
- Amazing Fantasy #1000: "You Get It" (with Marco Checchetto, anthology, 2022)
- G.O.D.S. #1-8 (with Valerio Schiti, 2023–2024) collected in G.O.D.S. (tpb, 272 pages, 2024, ISBN 978-1-302-94859-7)
- Ultimate Universe (2023)
  - Ultimate Invasion #1–4 (with Bryan Hitch, 2023) collected as Ultimate Invasion (Treasury Edition, 176 pages, 2024, ISBN 1-302-95484-9)
  - Ultimate Universe #1 (with Stefano Caselli, 2023)
  - Ultimate Spider-Man #1–24 (with Marco Checchetto, 2024–2026)
    - Vol. 1: Married With Children (collects #1-6, tpb, 168 pages, 2024, ISBN 978-1-302-95729-2)
    - Vol. 2: The Paper (collects #7-12, tpb, 152 pages, 2025, ISBN 978-1-302-95828-2)
    - Vol. 3: Family Business (collects #13-18, 160 pages, 2025, ISBN 978-1-302-95829-9)
    - Vol. 4: One Last Day (collects #19-24 and Ultimate Universe: Finale #1, 192 pages, 2026, ISBN 978-1-302-95830-5)
- Imperial #1-4 (with Federico Vicentini and Iban Coello, 2025) collected in Imperial (tpb, 312 pages, 2026, ISBN 978-1-302-96308-8)
- Midnight Universe:
  - Midnight X-Men #1– (with Matteo Della Fonte, since 2026)

=== Other publishers ===
- God is Dead #1–6 (co-written by Hickman and Mike Costa, art by Di Amorim, Avatar, 2013–2014) collected as God is Dead Volume 1 (tpb, 160 pages, 2014, ISBN 1-59291-229-X)
  - The series, which was initially announced to be only six issues, was continued as an ongoing comic written by Costa solo, drawn by various artists and collected as:
    - Volume 2 (collects #7–12, tpb, 160 pages, 2014, ISBN 1-59291-236-2)
    - Volume 3 (collects #13–18, tpb, 160 pages, 2014, ISBN 1-59291-244-3)
    - Volume 4 (collects #19–24, tpb, 144 pages, 2015, ISBN 1-59291-252-4)
    - Volume 5 (collects #25–30, tpb, 160 pages, 2015, ISBN 1-59291-256-7)
    - Volume 6 (collects #31–36, tpb, 144 pages, 2015, ISBN 1-59291-266-4)
    - Volume 7 (collects #37–42, tpb, 144 pages, 2015, ISBN 1-59291-271-0)
    - Volume 8 (collects #43–48, tpb, 160 pages, 2016, ISBN 1-59291-282-6)
  - In addition to the ongoing series, two anthology one-shots were released in 2014:
    - God is Dead: Book of Acts Alpha (written by Mike Costa, Alan Moore and Simon Spurrier)
    - God is Dead: Book of Acts Omega (written by Mike Costa, Kieron Gillen and Justin Jordan)
- Love is Love (one-page illustration, anthology graphic novel, 144 pages, IDW Publishing, 2016, ISBN 1-63140-939-5)
- Three Worlds, Three Moons (with Mike del Mundo and Mike Huddleston, webcomic/process blog, Substack, 2021–ongoing)

=== Cover illustrations ===
- Gamekeeper #2 (Virgin, 2007)
- 7 Brothers tpb (Virgin, 2007)
- Voodoo Child #3 (Virgin, 2007)
- Tall Tales of Vishnu Sharma: Panchatantra #4 (Virgin, 2008)
- Drafted #11 (Devil's Due, 2008)
- Cages #1 (Insomnia Publications, 2009)
- Fantastic Four vol. 5 #5 (Marvel, 2014)
- Transformers: Robots in Disguise #50 (IDW Publishing, 2016)
- Spawn #277 (Image, 2017)
- Youngblood vol. 6 #4 (Image, 2017)
- The Wicked + The Divine #30 (Image, 2017)
- Rat Queens vol. 2 #5 (Image, 2017)
- Ringside #11 (Image, 2017)
- Generation Gone #2 (Image, 2017)
- The Hard Place #1 (Image, 2017)
- Genius Cartel #1 (Image, 2017)
- Elsewhere #1 (Image, 2017)
- What's the Furthest Place from Here? #2 (Image, 2021)
- Loaded Bible: Blood of My Blood #1 (Image, 2022)
- Crossover #13 (Image, 2022)

Preceded by Mark Millar	Fantastic Four writer 2009–2012	Succeeded by Matt Fraction
Preceded by n/a	FF writer 2011–2012	Succeeded by Matt Fraction
Preceded by Jeph Loeb (Ultimate Comics: New Ultimates)	Ultimate Comics: The Ultimates writer 2011–2012	Succeeded by Sam Humphries
Preceded by Brian Michael Bendis	The Avengers writer 2013–2015	Succeeded by Mark Waid
Preceded by Brian Michael Bendis	New Avengers writer 2013–2015	Succeeded by Al Ewing
Preceded by G. Willow Wilson	X-Men writer 2019–2021	Succeeded by Gerry Duggan
