= S.H.I.E.L.D. (2010 series) =

2010 comic book series

- S.H.I.E.L.D. #1 (June 2010); Cover art by Gerald Parel.

Publication information
- Publisher: Marvel Comics
- Schedule: Monthly
- Genre: Spy, superhero
- Publication date: April 2010 – February 2012
- No. of issues: 13
- Main character(s): Brotherhood of the Shield: Archimedes; Galileo Galilei; Jābir ibn Hayyān; Zhang Heng; Imhotep; Isaac Newton; Nostradamus; Nathaniel Richards; Howard Stark; Leonardo da Vinci; Leonid Newton

Creative team
- Written by: Jonathan Hickman
- Artist: Dustin Weaver
- Letterer: Todd Klein
- Colorist: Christina Strain
- Editor(s): Daniel Ketchum; Irene Lee; Nick Lowe

S.H.I.E.L.D. is a comic book series published by Marvel Comics, premiering with a first issue cover dated June 2010. It details the secret history of the occult organization S.H.I.E.L.D. The series is written by Jonathan Hickman and drawn by Dustin Weaver.

== Publication history ==
The series was published from 2010 to 2012. The series was renumbered after issue 6.

== Plot ==
The series details the secret history of an occult organization called the Brotherhood of the Shield, with a history extending back to ancient Egypt.

The main story of the first issue is set in 1953 shortly after the death of Soviet dictator Joseph Stalin, during the height of the Cold War. Shield agents Nathaniel Richards and Howard Stark enlist a young man named Leonid with unspecified superpowers into the organization, taking him to Shield's High Council in the Immortal City under Rome. The High Council reveals that they know "the final fate of Man", and their mission is to ensure nothing threatens the world before this occurs. They have chosen Leonid because he has a destiny. Flashbacks reveal that the Shield was founded by Imhotep following a battle (alongside Apocalypse and the original Moon Knight) against the Brood, and that previous agents include Zhang Heng (who tricked a Celestial into using the sun to give birth to its child instead of destroying the Earth or the Moon to do so), Galileo Galilei (who fought against Galactus) and Leonardo da Vinci (who is shown with a mysterious device, flying off in an ornithopter).

Leonid spends three years working with the Shield before being visited by his father, a superhuman named the Night Machine who has encountered the Shield before, and apparently been killed by them. The Night Machine gives Leonid the key to a secret area of the headquarters, saying his destiny cannot be dictated by others. The issue ends with Leonid meeting Leonardo da Vinci, who has apparently traveled through time to use his device to save the world. Leonardo's return was met with resistance from Isaac Newton who saw it as a threat to his reign as leader of the organization. This eventually leads to a great schism that divides the Shield into two factions; one led by Leonardo da Vinci and one led by Newton. Meanwhile, the child of a Celestial, the Star Child, is picked up by Leonardo from the sun.

Also connected to the story are Renaissance man Michelangelo who as The Forever Man has amazing superhuman powers of time and space manipulation; and Nostradamus who was doused with the Infinity formula and tortured for centuries by Newton to tell the future for centuries. It is later discovered that The Night Machine is really Nikola Tesla, who received cybernetic implants from Michelangelo. Tesla is also discovered to be Leonid's adoptive father and that his biological father was Newton. The reader learns that Newton murdered Galileo Galilei and a host of others to meet his needs.

Night Machine, Stark, and Richards return to the city, and put a stop to the conflict by deciding to put the decision to Leonid on who is right, he chooses Leonardo da Vinci. Newton escapes to the future. Meanwhile, the Star Child goes mad on seeing that the world will end. The second volume stalled at issue 4, with the 5th issue completed not to be published until the 6th issue is ready to be started. Jonathan Hickman (writer) and Dustin Weaver (artist) were tied up with the Marvel summer crossover events for 2013.

== Reception ==
The first volume of the series holds an average rating of 8.0 by forty-one critics and the second a rating of 8.6 by thirteen critics according to review aggregation website Comic Book Roundup.

== Prints ==
=== Issues ===
Name	Title	Publication date	Comic Book Roundup rating
S.H.I.E.L.D. #1	"The Unholy Resurrection of Leonardo da Vinci"	April 2010	9.1 by eleven critics
S.H.I.E.L.D. #2	"Newton's Theory of Eternal Life"	June 2010	9.0 by six critics
S.H.I.E.L.D. #3	"The Theory of Eternal Life"	August 2010	7.6 by three critics
S.H.I.E.L.D. #4	"The Madness, the Star Child, and the Celestial Madonna"	October 2010	7.9 by eight critics
S.H.I.E.L.D. #5	"The Forgotten Machines of Nikola Tesla"	December 2010	7.5 by three critics
S.H.I.E.L.D. #6	"The Master's Hand"	February 2011	8.1 by five critics
S.H.I.E.L.D. (volume 2) #1	"Terribilità"	June 2011	8.1 by five critics
S.H.I.E.L.D. (volume 2) #2	"Fire"	August 2011	8.5 by one critic
S.H.I.E.L.D. (volume 2) #3	"The Fall"	October 2011	
S.H.I.E.L.D. (volume 2) #4	"All Together Now"	December 2011	
S.H.I.E.L.D. (volume 2) #5	"Yesterday. Today. Tomorrow."	May 2018	9.1 by four critics
S.H.I.E.L.D. (volume 2) #6	"I Am the Sun"	June 2018	9.3 by five critics

=== One-shots ===
Name	Tie-in to	Pages	Variants	Publication dates	UPC	Comic Book Roundup rating	Estimated sales (first month)
"S.H.I.E.L.D. - Infinity"	Infinity	48	1	2011	—N/a	8.0 by one professional critic	

=== Collected editions ===
Name	Material collected	Pages	Cover	Publication dates	ISBN	Comic Book Roundup rating
S.H.I.E.L.D.: Architects of Forever	S.H.I.E.L.D. (2010) #1-6 and material from S.H.I.E.L.D. #1 DIRECTOR'S CUT	192	SC	November 2, 2011	978–0785144229	8.0 by one professional critic
S.H.I.E.L.D.: The Human Machine	S.H.I.E.L.D. (2011) 1–4, S.H.I.E.L.D. BY HICKMAN & WEAVER 5–6, S.H.I.E.L.D. INFINITY	192	SC	April 30, 2019	978–0785152507	
S.H.I.E.L.D. by Hickman And Weaver	S.H.I.E.L.D. (2010) #1-6, Director's Cut; S.H.I.E.L.D.(2011) #1-4; S.H.I.E.L.D. by Hickman and Weaver (2018) #5-6; S.H.I.E.L.D. Infinity (2011)	384	HC	October 21, 2025	978-1302966386 (Gerald Parel cover); 978-1302966393 (Dustin Weaver DM cover)	

== See also ==
- 2010 in comics
- 2012 in comics
