= The Nightly News =

American comic book limited series

- Cover of the first issue

Publication information
- Publisher: Image Comics
- Schedule: Monthly
- Format: Limited series
- Publication date: November 2006 – June 2007
- No. of issues: 6

Creative team
- Created by: Jonathan Hickman
- Written by: Jonathan Hickman
- Artist: Jonathan Hickman
- Letterer: Jonathan Hickman
- Colorist: Jonathan Hickman
- Editor: Jonathan Hickman

Collected editions
- The Nightly News: ISBN 1-58240-766-5

The Nightly News is a six-issue American comic book limited series written and drawn by Jonathan Hickman and published by Image Comics.

== Plot ==
At an anti-globalization rally in New York City, a sniper called John Guyton — who calls himself "The Hand of The Voice" — shoots a protestor, causing panic. However, his true target is soon revealed when he, along with a couple of allies, proceeds to gun down multiple reporters and camera crews who arrive to cover the story. All three, along with their fellow "brothers" and "sisters", are members of a revolutionary cult made up of individuals whose lives were destroyed when they were targets of sensationalistic, irresponsible and/or fraudulent media coverage, and all are determined to destroy the mainstream media under the guidance of The Voice, their messianic leader who communicates with them only by cassette tape.

As more attacks on journalists occur, including the bombing of a bar frequented by reporters, high-ranking media moguls begin to pressure Senator Jay Rector, Chairman of the Senate FCC Oversight Committee, for increased protections for journalists. Their true motives, however, are more cynical; they want to protect their organization's profits and abilities to continue with their reckless, profit-driven approaches to journalism in the face of a new threat and possible public discontent. Meanwhile, disgraced journalist James Andrews is approached by Guyton and recruited into the cult, and is gradually indoctrinated into their methods and motives until faced with his ultimate recruitment test — murdering fellow journalist Warner Rogers, the New York Times reporter who broke the story of the journalistic fraud that ruined Andrews’ life.

Andrews shoots Rogers, but soon after overpowers Guyton and brings him to a cult deprogrammer; it is revealed that Andrews and Rogers had been working together after Andrews, learning of the cult's existence, had decided to go undercover to expose them. In response to the attacks, Senator Rector has drafted legislation called the Freedom of Media Act, but in addition to increased protections for journalists informs the media moguls that they must accept either increased government oversight or weaker protections against liability for the stories they publish; the moguls, viewing it as a safer "public-friendly" option with little teeth, choose the latter option.

After being freed from his brainwashing, Guyton is overcome with remorse at his actions and agrees to go with Andrews to the police and confess what he has done. Before he can, however, he is intercepted by a limo owned by The Voice, leaving Andrews to face the police by himself. When Andrews’ links to the cult are uncovered by the police, they accuse him of being the ringleader of the cult. As Rogers is dead and there is no other evidence that Andrews was undercover, Andrews realizes that the cult has set him up as a fall guy. Guyton speaks to The Voice via speakerphone, who urges him to follow through with their plan; when Guyton resists, The Voice gives him the address of Elias Lee, the reporter who broke the story that ruined Guyton's life. Guyton confronts Lee, who eventually admits that his main motivation for writing the story and destroying Guyton was for power, profit and because he could. Guyton kills Lee and decides to complete The Voice's plan.

A series of coordinated attacks on the media occur, killing all of the media moguls and several well-known journalists; Senator Rector, holding an interview with one of them, narrowly escapes death. During the attacks, most of the members of the cult are killed, including Guyton; no longer brainwashed, Guyton admits to himself before his death that he is no longer certain of the righteousness of his actions, but feels that he has at least done something to protect innocent people from experiencing what he did at the hands of the media.

Following the attacks, the Freedom of Media Act is passed by the US Congress; however, the weakened liability protections have proved to be more damaging against the media than expected, as thousands have launched lawsuits against media organisations for unfair and unethical reporting. James Andrews has been convicted of being The Voice, despite his protestations of innocence. After his conviction, Senator Rector visits Andrews in prison and reveals that he is The Voice, and set Andrews up because he knew all along that Andrews was a reporter. Rector experienced an epiphany after a bout of late-life depression and decided to spend his remaining years destroying the institutions he thought were corrupting America, using weak and easily manipulated victims of the media as his tools. Leaving Andrews in prison, Rector meets with the surviving members of the cult to plan a campaign against his next target — lawyers.

== Awards ==
- 2008: Nominated for "Best Limited Series" Eisner Award.

== Collected editions ==
The series has been collected into a trade paperback:

- The Nightly News (184 pages, June 2007, ISBN 1-58240-766-5)

== See also ==
- Network
- Hard News
