= The Fox Sister =

Korean fairy tale

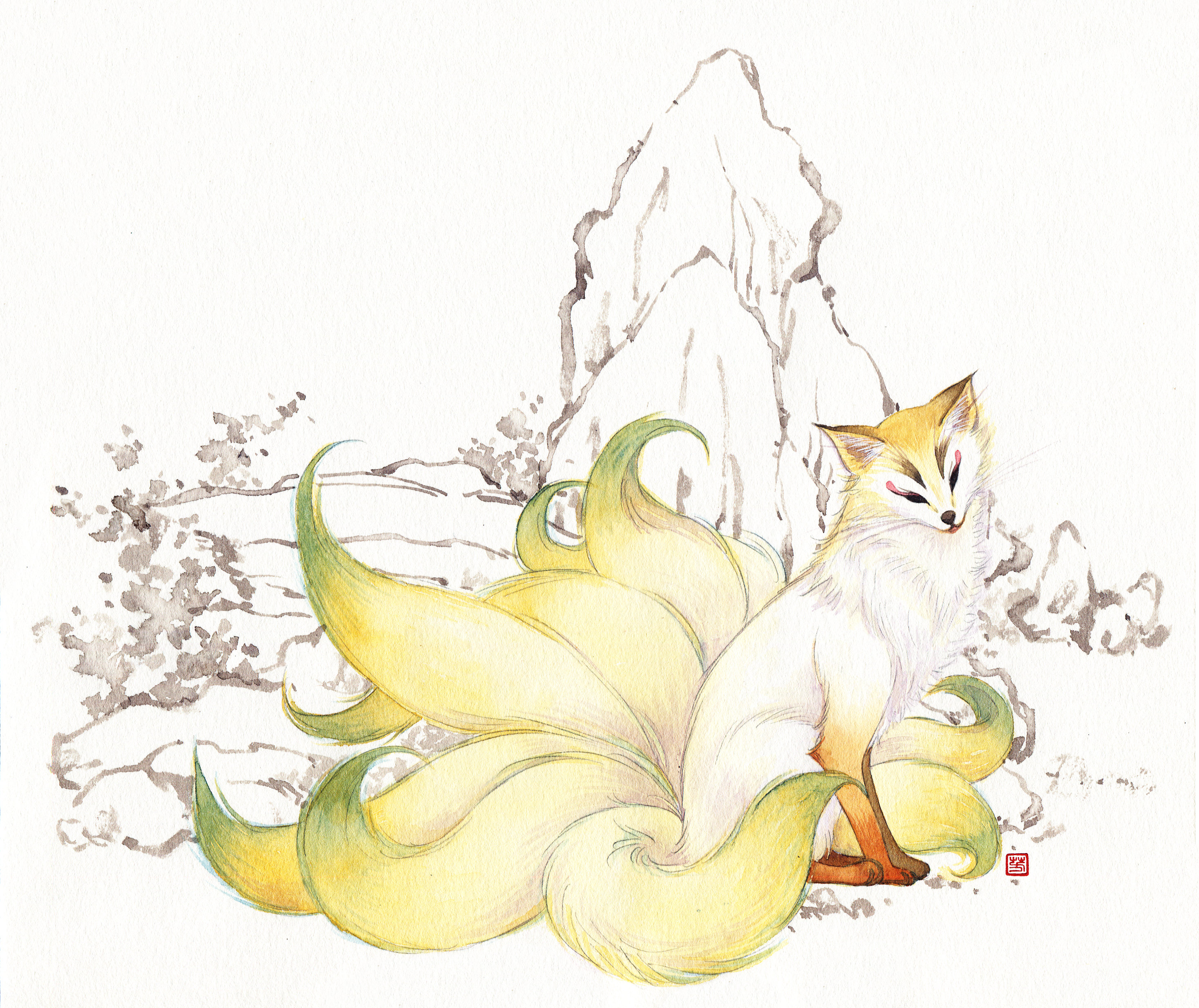

The Fox Sister (Korean: 여우 누이; RR: Yeou nui) is a Korean folk tale about the mythical Korean nine-tailed fox demon (kumiho). The tale follows the story of an old couple, their sons, and their beloved daughter, who is later revealed to be a fox demon. The fox sister eats the old couple but is later defeated by one of the brothers, who receives magical items from a supporting character. According to a 2021 study, at least 75 variants of the tale exist throughout South Korea, with varying details on how the fox sister is defeated, or from whom the brother receives the magical items.

== Synopsis ==
A man had three sons and no daughter. He prayed for a daughter, even if she was a fox. His wife gave birth to a daughter, but when the girl was six, one of their cows would die every night. One night, he sent his oldest son to watch. The boy watched and told him that his sister did it, by pulling the liver out of the cow and eating it. His father accused him of having fallen asleep and having a nightmare and threw his son out. Next, the second son was sent to watch over the cows, and nothing happened until the next full moon. Then, the sister struck again, the second son reported what he saw and he too was thrown out. Following this, the youngest son was sent to watch; he claimed that their sister had gone to the outhouse and that the cows must have died from seeing the moon.

The older brothers wandered until they met a Buddhist monk, who sent them back with four magical bottles: a yellow one, a white one, a blue one, and a red one. Once they arrived, they found their sister living alone; she told them their brother left for Hanyang and their parents had died and implored them to stay. Finally, she persuaded them to stay the night and made a rich meal for them. At night, the older and second brothers were woken by weird sounds. They went into the kitchen carefully and saw their sister. She told them that she had killed their parents and she need two more to become a human.

The brothers fled, and began throwing the magical bottles behind them to deter their bloodthirsty sister. The older brother first threw the yellow bottle behind them, and it became a mountain of boulders; however, as a fox, the sister easily climbed over it. The second brother then threw the white bottle behind them, it became a thicket of thorns to trap her; however, as a fox, she swiftly navigated her way through it. The older brother then threw the blue bottle behind them and trapped her in a river, but she swam across it. Lastly, the second brother threw the red bottle behind them, and she was trapped in a fire. It burned her into a crisp until she was no more than a mosquito.

== Theme ==
"The Fox Sister" differentiates from many other Korean folktales, as there is no clear moral. In his 2021 thesis, Kim Jun-hui interpreted obsession and fear as the two major themes of the tale. Alternatively, in a 2012 article titled Korean Folklore and Implications for Korean American Women, Christine Jean Hong discusses the role of the fox motif in Korean culture: "It is no coincidence that foxes are predominantly female, evil, hyper-sexualized, and magical."

== Adaptations ==
The folk tale has inspired, among other works, the webcomic The Fox Sister.
