= God Hates Astronauts =

Comic book series by Ryan Browne

- Cover art for God Hates Astronauts #1 (September 2014) by Ryan Browne

Publication information
- Publisher: Image Comics
- Schedule: Monthly
- Format: Ongoing series
- Genre: Science fiction/comedy
- Publication date: September 2014 to July 2015
- No. of issues: 3 (webcomic) 10 (Image Comics)
- Main character(s): Star Grass; Starrior; The Anti-Mugger; Gnarled Winslow; 3-D Cowboy

Creative team
- Created by: Ryan Browne
- Written by: Ryan Browne
- Artist: Ryan Browne
- Letterer(s): Chris Crank and Ryan Browne
- Colorist: Jordan Boyd
- Editor: Jordan Browne

Collected editions
- The Head That Wouldn't Die!: ISBN 978-1-60706-808-2
- A Star is Born!: ISBN 978-1-63215-196-4
- Cosmic Apocalypse!: ISBN 978-1-63215-624-2
- The Omni-Mega-Bus: ISBN 978-1-5343-2188-5

God Hates Astronauts is an American science fiction/comedy comic book series written and illustrated by Ryan Browne. Originally released as a webcomic, it was later published monthly by Image Comics. The series depicts The Power Persons Five, a superhero team that does not fight much crime. Instead, they bicker, have extramarital affairs, and pursue personal vendettas. A satirical take on superhero comics, the humor in the series is sometimes referential, sometimes absurdist. Browne was influenced by other humor comics such as Scud: The Disposable Assassin, Milk & Cheese, and The Tick.

== Publication history ==
Writer and artist Ryan Browne created God Hates Astronauts as a 24-hour comic in 2007. In 2010 Browne relaunched it as a free webcomic and, for the next three years, he updated it sporadically. Via Kickstarter Browne collected all three issues comprising the first story arc, "The Head That Wouldn't Die!", along with the original 24-hour comic, and pinups and backup features drawn by other comic book artists, in a hardcover trade edition. After the success of the Kickstarter campaign, Image Comics republished the book as a trade paperback. In September 2014, Image Comics relaunched God Hates Astronauts as a continuing monthly series, beginning with the second story arc, "A Star Is Born".

== Plot ==
The first story arc, "The Head That Wouldn't Die!", introduces the Power Persons Five (PP5), and their nemesis John L. Sullivan and King Tiger Eating a Cheeseburger. In order to prevent farmers from launching homemade rockets into space, NASA, under the directorship of Sir Hippothesis (a human-hippopotamus hybrid), has established the superhero group the Power Persons Five: led by Dr. Professor, a humanoid rhinoceros, with team members Star Fighter, his wife Starrior, The Impossible, The Anti-Mugger, and Craymok. Sometimes they save the world. In a fight against John L. Sullivan, who plans to conquer the world with an army of fighting bears, Star Fighter's head is permanently disfigured, and Sullivan is killed by The Impossible. The damage to Star Fighter's head strains his and Starrior's marriage, so they attend group couples-counseling with Montel. There, Starrior meets and later begins an affair with Texas Tom, a cowboy haunted by the ghostly cow head Blue Grass. At a seedy motel, Blue Grass and Star Fighter confront Starrior and Texas Tom. Tom shoots Star Fighter's disfigured head, which bursts, leaking gore. Later, Star Fighter cuts off the remains of his head and replaces it with Blue Grass, transforming into Star Grass, the cosmic ghost. Meanwhile, the fighting bears use magic to resurrect John L. Sullivan as a sentient zombie, and Sullivan attacks and wrests control of PP5 Headquarters.

Starrior enlists Texas Tom's help to save her teammates. They recruit Gnarled Winslow (an ex-Chicago cop), Reed Spacer, and Crazy Train to aid in the attack. Star Grass returns to Headquarters and kills Sullivan with a single nuclear punch. Then Star Grass gives the bears star rings and drafts them into NASA to get revenge on Starrior. When Starrior, Texas Tom, Crazy Train, Gnarled Winslow, and Reed Spacer show up, Star Grass and his star bears fight them. Crazy Train accidentally kills herself. The battle is interrupted by an irate Sir Hippothesis. In the aftermath, The Anti-Mugger (irradiated by Star Grass) quits the PP5, Sir Hippothesis fires Star Grass, and Star Grass sues NASA. In a recess from the ensuing trial, it is revealed that The Anti-Mugger has a new, mutated third arm, and Starrior is pregnant with Star Grass' daughter. Everyone is attacked by John L. Sullivan, whose mustache survived the explosion and transformed an astronaut into Super Sullivan, a giant monster with wings and a unicorn horn. After Star Grass saves Starrior from Super Sullivan and Gnarled Winslow destroys Sullivan and his mustache, the married couple reconciles, Sir Hippothesis makes Star Grass PP5 team leader, and Star Grass fires Dr. Professor and hires Gnarled Winslow. During all of this, astronaut farmers have been launching into space unchecked. One of their ships collides with that of Admiral Tiger Eating a Cheeseburger, only son of King Tiger Eating a Cheeseburger, absolute ruler of Planet Crabulon. The King is told of his son's death.

The second arc, "A Star is Born!", picks up two years later. The remaining members of the PP5—Star Grass, Gnarled Winslow, Starrior, and The Impossible—are suppressing the astronaut farmers. Star Grass and Starrior are raising Starlina, their super-powered infant daughter. Gnarled Winslow is haunted by the ghost of Crazy Train, his former lover. The Impossible becomes lost in space. Craymok, The Anti-Mugger, and Dr. Professor live together in a small apartment. The Anti-Mugger's third arm has become sentient and started mugging people, but he does not know it. Dr. Professor has become a conspiracy nut. King Tiger Eating a Cheeseburger begins his attack on Earth, to avenge his son. Backstory is revealed in flashbacks for NASA, Sir Hippothesis, Dr. Professor, and Planet Crabulon. The Anti-Mugger is arrested for mugging Dr. Professor. During a seance, Gnarled Winslow and Texas Tom are physically fused together and transported to the spirit world. The Impossible is rescued by the New Gentendians, a race of aliens who have also rescued Admiral Tiger Eating a Cheeseburger. As King Tiger Eating a Cheeseburger's forces finally reach Earth, Starlina, on a sugar high, loses control of her powers and kills Star Grass. The New Gentendians detect the blast of Starlina's powers.

== Characters ==
=== Power Persons Five ===
- Star Fighter/Star Grass (Bill) - The male lead of the series, the indestructible leader of the Power Persons Five (PP5), Star Fighter's the son of the Cosmicnaut, the greatest warrior from the 12th Galaxy. Star Fighter can fly, shoot energy blasts, and is indestructible. During a fight with John L. Sullivan and his bears, Sullivan punches Star Fighter's head until it is a giant sack filled with gore. The resulting disfigurement strains Star Fighter's marriage with Starrior. When Starrior starts an affair with Texas Tom, whom she met in Montel's couples-counseling group, Star Fighter teams up with Blue Grass, the floating ghost of a cow's head (who haunts Texas Tom), to confront the lovers. Star Fighter's head sack is destroyed during the encounter, so he cuts off the remaining skin and replaces it with Blue Grass. Together, they become Star Grass, the cosmic ghost. Star Grass is crass, selfish, and violent. After Gnarled Winslow kills Super Sullivan, NASA gives Star Grass unlimited funding and full control of the PP5.
- Starrior (Shelley) - The female lead of the series, she's a waitress at a roadside diner until she marries Star Fighter and he gives her a cosmic ring, which gives her the ability to shoot stars. When Star Fighter's head is destroyed by John L. Sullivan, she has a brief affair with Texas Tom. She and Star Grass (the former Star Fighter) reconcile after he saves her from Super Sullivan, and she discovers she's pregnant with Star Fighter's daughter.
- The Impossible (Janet) - Because she put on a magical mask at a carnival mask shop, Janet has gained the ability to do impossible things.
- The Anti-Mugger (Dave) - The Anti-Mugger has no super-powers, just the commitment to stop all muggers and muggings. He refuses Star Grass's order to attack Starrior during the fight at PP5 Headquarters. In protest, the Anti-Mugger quits the PP5. In the second battle against Sullivan, Anti-Mugger is accidentally irradiated by Star Grass, and a third arm grows from his chest. Now he works in a supermarket and lives in an apartment with Craymok and Dr. Professor.
- Craymok - A monster created when circus performers and lovers Clayton 'Da Strong and Mocking Seal (an actual seal) are fused together by a magic hag. He has "primal ape strength and rechargeable laser eyes of some kind." He leaves the PP5 when the Anti-Mugger is fired.

=== Other NASA employees ===
- Gnarled Winslow - When Owl-Kaida rips the arms off former Chicago cop Karuhl Winslow, Texas Tom rushes him to the nearest doctor, a veterinarian, who grafts gorilla arms to the bleeding stumps. Thereafter, Karuhl takes the name Gnarled Winslow. He's a member of Starrior and Texas Tom's team during the fight against Star Grass and the Star Bears at PP5 Headquarters. Later, after he kills Super Sullivan, Gnarled is hired by NASA as a new team member. They give him robot arms.
- Dr. Professor - A NASA employee and friend of Sir Hippothesis since the 1970s, he leads the PP5 until Star Grass is put in charge following Super Sullivan's defeat. In appearance, he is a humanoid rhinoceros as a result of genetic experimentation by the aliens of Spogon Two.
- Sir Hippothesis - A human-hippopotamus hybrid created by Louis Pasteur in 1955, he conquered parts of the world with an army of jungle animals, and is now the head of NASA.
- Time Giraffe - He's a humanoid giraffe in a high-tech suit. He handles Star Grass and Starrior's technical needs and provides them with babysitters.

=== Residents of Planet Crabulon ===
- King Tiger Eating a Cheeseburger - The primary antagonist of the first Image Comics arc, he is a humanoid tiger who eats cheeseburgers, and is the conquering ruler of Planet Crabulon, a planet populated by humanoid crabs. He is prone to fights of violence. Since the 1970s, he has had a treaty with Earth restricting terrestrial space exploration. Along with a resident of Crabulon, King Tiger makes a cameo appearance in The Manhattan Projects #21 drawn by guest artist Ryan Browne.
- Admiral Tiger Eating a Cheeseburger - Sent into deep space recon by his father, King Tiger Eating a Cheeseburger, he is killed when an astronaut farmer from Earth in a makeshift spacecraft collides with his ship.
- Pandor - He is a humanoid panda, and royal advisor to King Tiger Eating a Cheeseburger.

=== Others ===
- 3-D Cowboy - The series's narrator starting with the first Image Comics issue, his presence is as yet unexplained within continuity. In appearance, he resembles a small ghost with a cowboy hat, and is drawn as an anaglyph 3D image. He is invisible to the other characters but occasionally interacts with them physically.
- Starlina - She's the super-powered infant daughter of Star Grass and Starrior.
- Texas Tom - He's Starrior's former lover and Gnarled's friend.
- Crazy Train (Becky) - Becky is a mild-mannered law student, and Karuhl Winslow's mistress, until a purple dildo thrown from a skyscraper hits her in the head, sending her into a coma. Becky later awakens bloodthirsty and reckless as the sword-fighter Crazy Train. During the fight against Star Grass and the Star Bears at PP5 Headquarters, she accidentally kills herself with her own swords. Now she's a ghost.
- John L. Sullivan - The primary antagonist of the first story arc, former boxing champion of the world, Bostonian John L. Sullivan is kidnapped by aliens from Planet Sporgon, but manages to kill their leader, then capture their ship and use it to recruit an army of bears. He plans to conquer Earth with his fighting bears and to reclaim the title of heavyweight boxing champ. He has fought and been killed by the PP5 three times. During the first fight, he destroys Star Fighter's head, then the Impossible breaks his neck. His army of fighting bears, using magic, resurrects him as a zombie, and he attacks PP5 Headquarters. Star Grass blows him up. His mustache flies into orbit and transforms an astronaut into Super Sullivan, a giant winged and horned monster. Super Sullivan is shot and killed by Gnarled Winslow.

== Regular features ==
Issues 2–5 of the Image Comics run contain fake one-page advertisements titled "Goofin' With Gnarled", art by Brad Mcginty and Jordan Boyd. Issues 2–5 each conclude with a two page chapter of "Imposiclypse Now", art by Alejandro Bruzzese.

The first trade edition—which collects the three webcomic issues—includes 18 two-page origin stories, each written by Ryan Browne and drawn by a different guest artist:

Title	Artist	Colorist (if different)
"Star Fighter"	Tom Scioli	
"Starrior"	Jenny Frison	
"The Anti-Mugger"	Ryan Browne	
"The Impossible"	Tim Seeley	Ryan Browne
"Craymok"	Nick Pitarra	Megan Wilson
"Texas Tom"	Chris Mitten	Ryan Browne
"John L. Sullivan"	Andy Macdonald	Rico Renzi
"John L. Sullivan's Criminal Bears"	C.P. Wilson III	Ryan Browne
"Dr. Professor"	Gabriel Bautista	
"Gnarled Winslow"	Greg and Fake Petre	
"Crazy Train"	Tradd Moore	Ryan Browne
"Sir Hippothesis"	Cody Schibi	Ryan Browne
"Reed Spacer"	Alejandro Bruzzese	
"Mummy Bailiff"	Kyle Strahm	Ryan Browne
"Admiral Tiger Eating A Cheeseburger"	Riley Rossmo	Ryan Browne
"Mr. Crabtree"	Hilary Barta	Ryan Browne
"Owlvin"	Zander Cannon	
"Hugh Manatee"	Sean Dove	

== Reception ==
=== Critical reception ===
The Image series holds an average score of 8.3 out of 10 at the review aggregator website Comic Book Roundup.

ComicsAlliance stated that "other than being held together with two staples and having the words in more or less the right order, [God Hates Astronauts is] weird in every way, with something freshly bizarre on every single page," and compared it to the work of "the Farrelly Brothers in their prime", but emphasized that in addition to "how over-the-top goofy it is", the comic's success is also the result of "a level of craftsmanship (...) that's almost impossible to ignore." Comic Book Resources lauded it as "absolutely crazy in the best ways possible", with writing that was "reminiscent of the works of Pendleton Ward or David Lynch."

=== Beer Hates Astronauts ===
On August 30, 2013 Half Acre Beer Company in Chicago released Beer Hates Astronauts, an IPA brewed with Citra hops and Vienna malt, with a label designed by Ryan Browne. Beer Hates Astronauts has been very well received, currently holding a 98 rating on review aggregator sites Beeradvocate and ratebeer.

== Collected editions ==
Title	Material collected	Publication date	Notes
God Hates Astronauts Vol. 1: The Head That Wouldn't Die!	God Hates Astronauts (vol. 1) #1-3	October 9, 2013	978-1-60706-808-2
God Hates Astronauts Vol. 2: A Star is Born!	God Hates Astronauts (vol. 2) #1-5	February 4, 2015	978-1-63215-196-4
God Hates Astronauts Vol. 3: Cosmic Apocalypse!	God Hates Astronauts (vol. 2) #6-10	December 2, 2015	978-1-63215-624-2
God Hates Astronauts: The Omni-Mega-Bus	God Hates Astronauts (vol. 1) #1-4, God Hates Astronauts (vol. 2) #1-10, God Hates Astronauts Presents: 3-D Cowboy's 2-D Spectacular #1, God Hates Astronauts Presents: 3-D Cowboy's 2-D Spectacular: The Garbage Edition, Grenade Horse Apocalypse #0, Goats Eat Castanets #1	March 15, 2022	978-1-5343-2188-5
