= Blue pencil (editing) =

Pencil used to show corrections to written copies

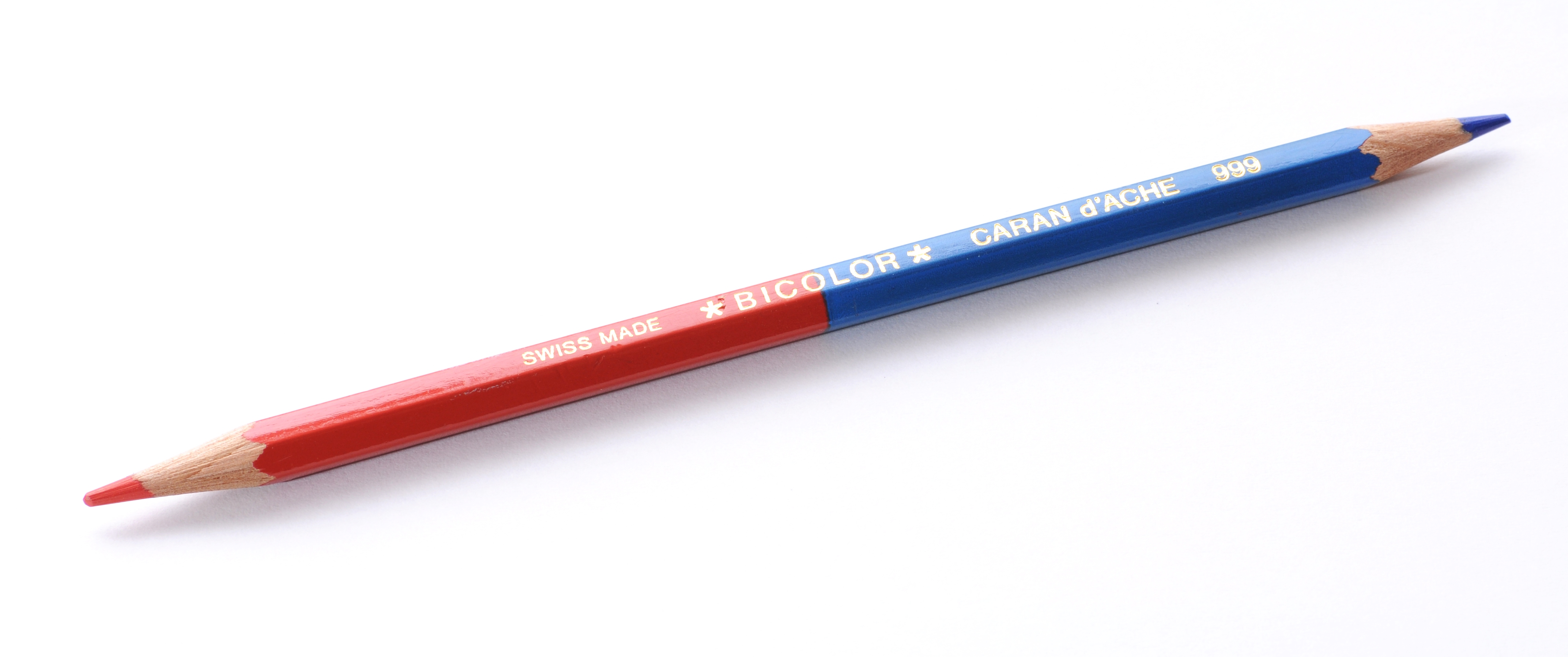
- Caran d'Ache 999 pencil
- Type: Colored pencil
- Inception
- Manufacturer: Caran d'Ache; Faber-Castell; Staedtler
- Available: Yes

A blue pencil, also known as a checking pencil, is a two-color pencil traditionally used by an editor to correct a written copy. The blue end is typically Prussian blue, and the red end is typically a warm vermilion. They are most often half red and half blue, but some are 70% red and 30% blue. An editor-in-chief would use a blue colored pencil to make proofreading marks and final notes on a manuscript before sending it to be typeset and published.

The blue pencil, and its colored marks representing corrections and excisions, became associated with the editing process and editorial oversight.

Of course it takes skill to be a poet! But an editor? A pair of shears, a blue pencil, and a paste-pot!

— Alice Corbin Henderson

Since the introduction of desktop publishing, editing is typically done on computer files, without literal blue pencils. They continue to be used in elementary schools in parts of Europe, where they are known as "post pencils", and in the Japanese newspaper industry. A different type of pencil, utilizing non-photo blue (like cyan), is used by some comics artists.

== History ==
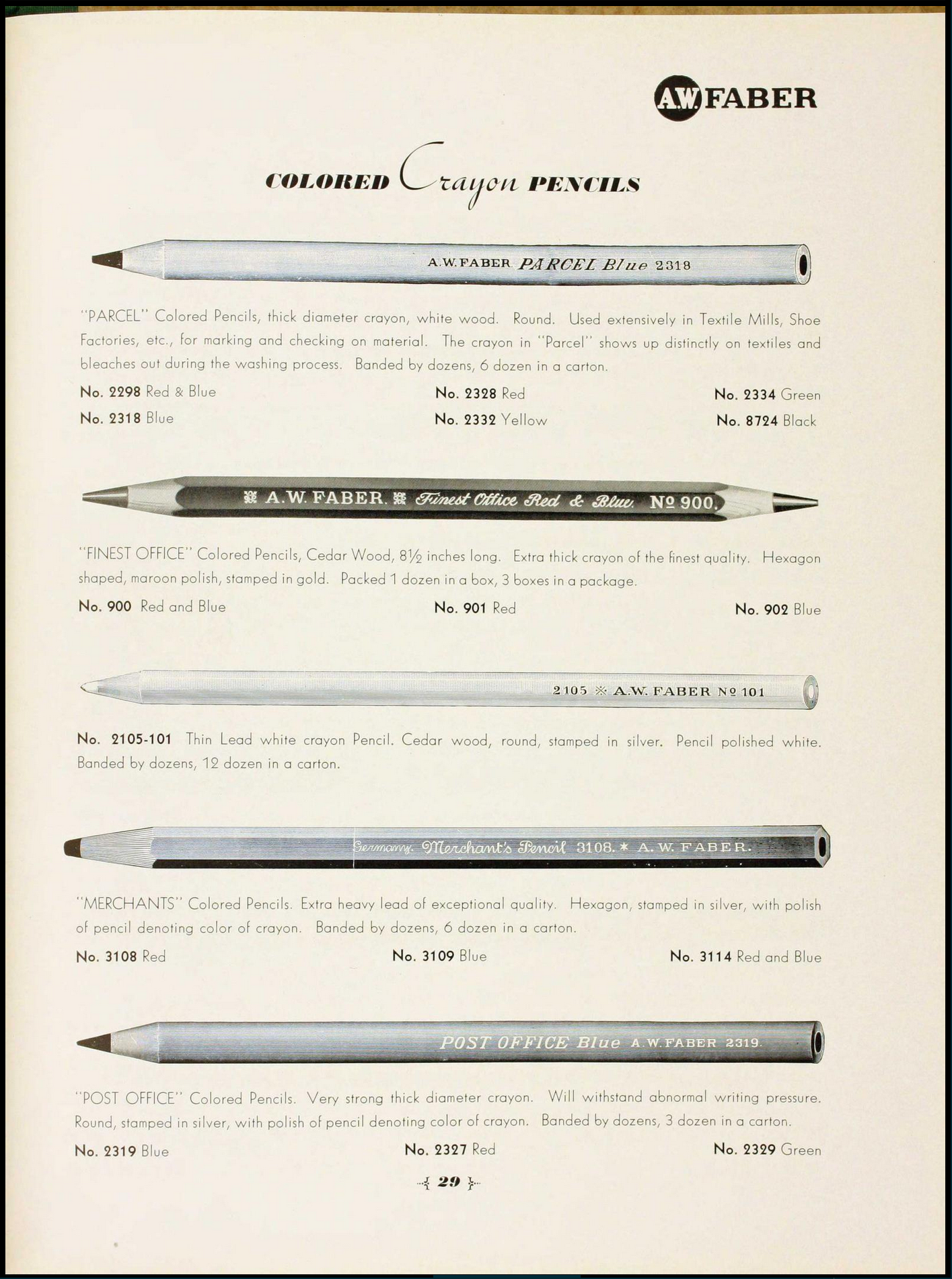
AW Faber Catalog (1940) with blue, red, and bicolor pencils

Neither the exact date that blue pencils were introduced nor the details of how they became an editing standard are certain. Blue checking pencils were sold in the United States during the nineteenth century. Eberhard Faber offered a range of two-color pencils by 1873. Multinational manufacturer AW Faber sold wood and mechanical blue pencils in the late 1800s. By 1888, "blue pencil" was being used as a synonym for "edit" or "censor". During World War II, bi-color pencils were used to mark troop positions on maps.

=== Censorship ===
Blue pencils became associated with editorial control and with censorship. Under the Estado Novo in Portugal the "blue pencil" became a metaphor as editors would use blue pencils to censor out portions of works rather than banning the entire text. In parts of Africa, the "blue pencil" became a metaphor for the censorship and banning of entire books.

=== Post pencils ===
In early twentieth-century Germany, blue pencils were used to mark postal routes. Checking pencils have been called "post pencils" as early as 1909 in Europe. The blue pencils for schoolchildren are sold as such, or else as "copying pencils". In parts of Europe, post pencils are used still in elementary schools.

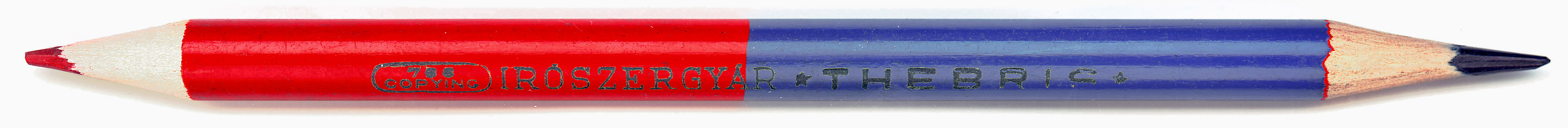
Hungarian school pencil

In Hungary, children are taught the difference between uppercase and lowercase letters by writing the cases in different colors. In Germany, they are used to write separate syllables and numerical digits in alternating colors. In Italian classrooms, they are used to mark separate types of errors.

== Non-photo blue pencils ==
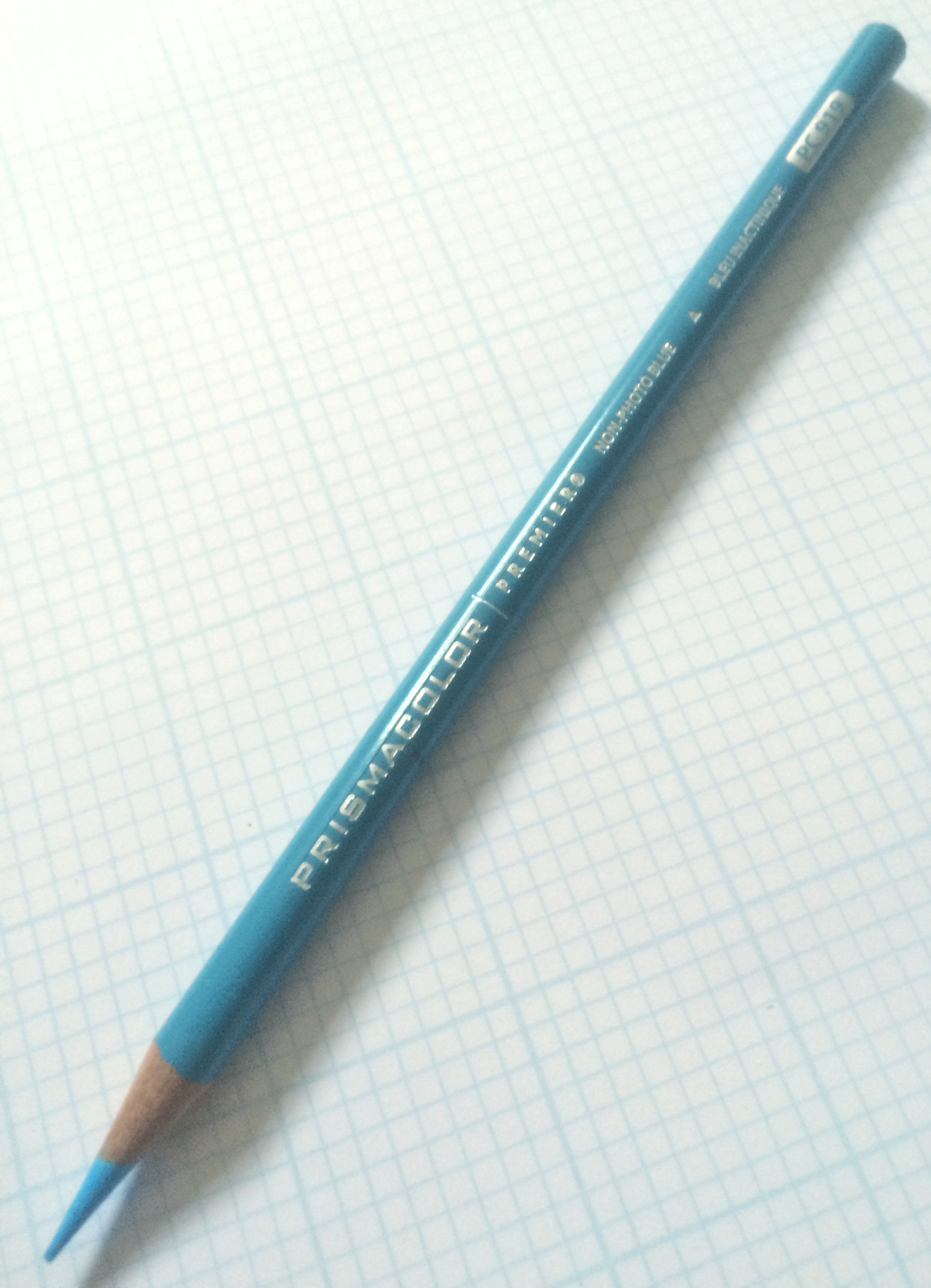
Non-photo blue pencils have had a different but overlapping role in comic book production

In the production of comic books, blue pencils have a different but overlapping usage. American comic books are typically illustrated by multiple specialists. The penciller does the initial drawing, the inker brushes black ink over the pencil art, and the colorist adds colors to photocopies or digital scans of the inked art. Some pencillers have worked with non-photo blue pencils. These cyan colored pencils leave marks that orthochromatic film for offset lithography does not capture, and digital scanners can filter that out.

Editors used the same cyan pencils to add notes to art before publishing, like editors in the broader publishing industry. Original pencil art for comics was initially treated "as a means to an end rather than as an object of intrinsic value" but has come to be viewed as valuable art. The un-inked pencil drawings provide a more detailed representation of the original illustrators' work and have blue-pencil notes that sometimes go beyond technical issues to address ideas discussed in the creative process but never used in finished comic books.

For similar reasons, some illustrators use red pencils that can be filtered out with xerography or digital scanners. Comic book artist Rob Guillory used such a red checking pencil to illustrate Chew and Farmhand.

== Legal doctrine ==
The blue pencil doctrine is a legal concept in common law countries where a court finds that portions of a contract are void or unenforceable, but other portions are enforceable. It derives its name from the court's ability to edit a written contract, similar to how an editor-in-chief would edit a manuscript.

The blue pencil rule allows the legally valid enforceable provisions of the contract to stand despite the nullification of the legally void unenforceable provisions. However, the revised version must represent the original meaning. The rule may not be invoked, for example, to delete the word "not" and thereby change a negative to a positive.
