= Farmhand (disambiguation) =

A farmhand is an agricultural labourer.

Farmhard may also refer to:

- Farmhand (comics), an American comic by Rob Guillory, published since 2018
- farmhand, a software platform for hydroponic growers developed by Freight Farms
- Farmhand, a brand of agricultural machinery from the AgEquipment Group, later acquired by AGCO
