= Blue pencil =

Blue pencil may refer to:

- Blue pencil (editing), a pencil traditionally used by an editor or sub-editor to show corrections to written copy
- Blue pencil doctrine, a legal concept in common law countries

== See also ==
- George Pirie Thomson, author of the Blue Pencil Admiral - a memoir of the author's experience as British Chief Press Censor during World War II.
