= Blue pencil doctrine =

Legal doctrine

The blue pencil doctrine is a legal concept in common law countries in which a court finds that portions of a contract are void or unenforceable, but other portions of the contract are enforceable. The blue pencil rule allows the legally valid enforceable provisions of the contract to stand despite the nullification of the legally void unenforceable provisions. The revised version, however, must still represent the original meaning. The rule may not be invoked, for example, to delete the word "not" and thereby change a negative to a positive.

== Etymology ==
The term refers to the traditional practice of using a blue pencil to edit written copy.

== In United Kingdom ==
The principle was established by the House of Lords in the case of Nordenfelt v Maxim, Nordenfelt Guns and Ammunition Co (1894), in which the court struck unenforceable non-compete clauses.

Other statutory provisions such as the Sale of Goods Act 1979 and the Unfair Terms in Consumer Contracts Regulations 1999 have established the blue pencil principle in statute law.

In Rose & Frank Co v JR Crompton & Bros Ltd, the blue pencil rule was used to strike out an unacceptable clause in a memorandum of understanding agreement, which appeared to try to exclude the jurisdiction of the courts. The unenforceable part having been excised, the remainder of the agreement was valid and served to establish that the agreement was not intended by the parties to be binding at law.

== In other jurisdictions ==
In most jurisdictions, courts routinely "blue pencil" or reform covenants that are deemed not reasonable. The blue pencil doctrine gives courts the authority to strike unreasonable clauses from a non-compete agreement, leaving the rest to be enforced, or actually to modify the agreement to reflect the terms that the parties originally could have and probably should have agreed to. In Israel, the blue pencil method has been used to strike out illegal or unconstitutional parts of a statute and to leave the rest intact.

== See also ==
- Rectification (law)
- Severability
