= Penciller =

Artist who works on pencil illustrations

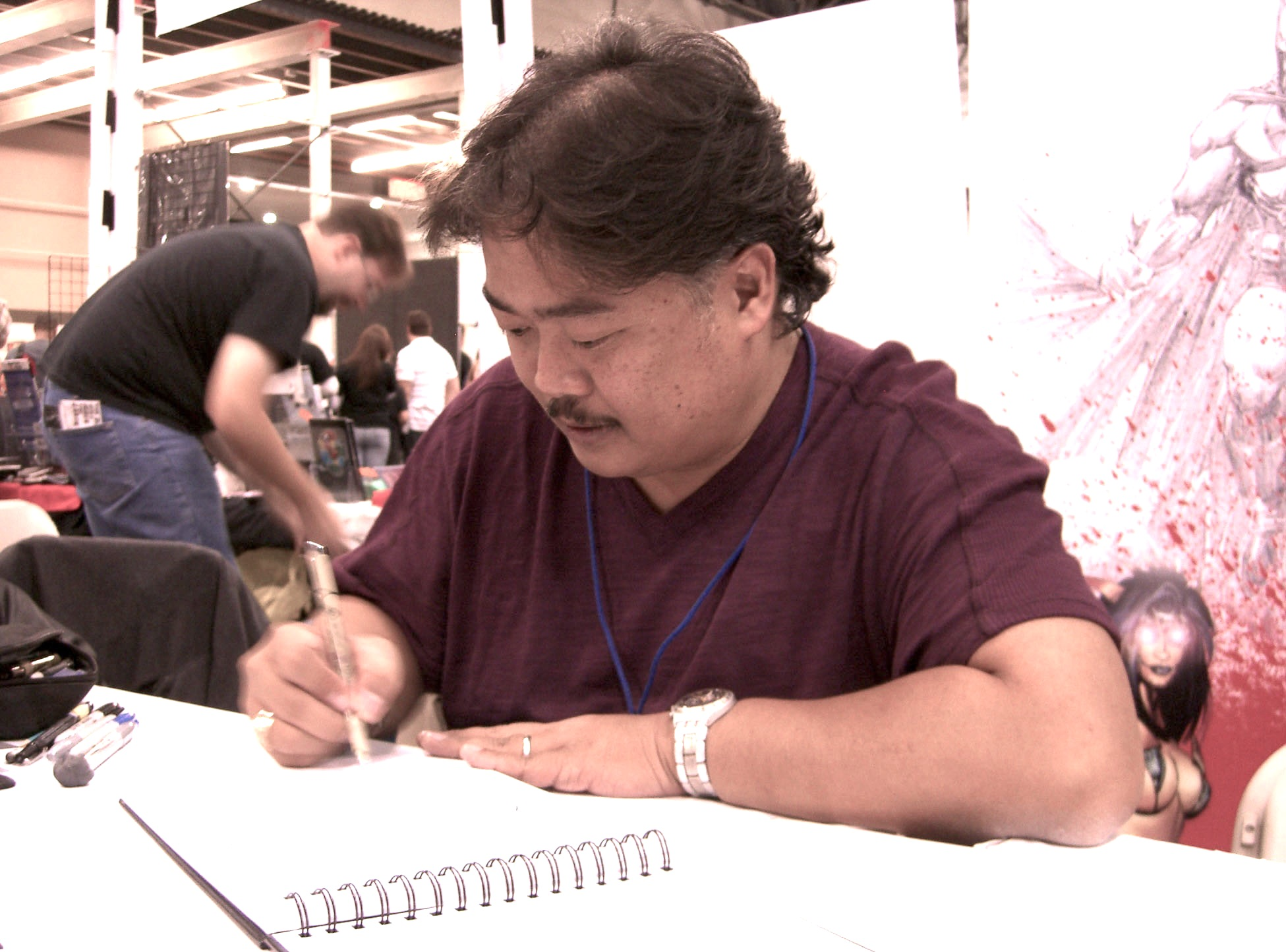
Penciller creating a comic book

A penciller (or penciler) is an artist who works on the creation of comic books, graphic novels, and similar visual art forms, with a focus on the initial pencil illustrations.

In the American comic book industry, the penciller is the first step in rendering the story in visual form, and may require several steps of feedback with the writer. These artists are concerned with layout (positions and vantages on scenes) to showcase steps in the plot.

== Tools and materials ==
Traditional printing technology for newspapers and comic books did not allow for quality reproduction of pencil drawings. Accordingly, artists would do the preliminary drafting in pencil, then draw over the pencil work in India ink for final reproduction. When these tasks are divided between two people, they are often referred to respectively as penciller and inker.

The penciller, as the name suggests, works in pencil. Beyond this basic description, however, different artists choose to use a wide variety of different tools. While many artists use traditional wood pencils, others prefer mechanical pencils or drafting leads, which do not require sharpening. Pencillers may use any lead hardness they wish, although many artists use a harder lead (like a 2H) to make light lines for initial sketches, then turn to a slightly softer lead (like a HB) for finishing phases of the drawing. Still other artists do their initial layouts using a light-blue colored pencil because that color tends to disappear during photocopying or printing.

Most US comic book pages are drawn oversized on large sheets of paper, usually Bristol board. The customary size of comic book pages in the mainstream American comics industry is 11 by 17 inches. The inker usually works directly over the penciller's pencil marks, though occasionally pages are inked on translucent paper, such as drafting vellum, or with the use of an art projector, preserving the original pencils. The artwork is later photographically reduced in size during the printing process. With the advent of digital illustration programs such as Photoshop, more and more artwork is produced digitally, either in part or entirely (see below).

Advances in printing techniques allow a greater range of possibilities for artists. In the 1980s, DC Comics experimented with reproducing the work of noted artist Gene Colan from his original pencils. Artist Julie Delporte works with colored pencils, and her stories are reproduced directly in color from the pencilled art.

== Notable creators and their techniques ==
=== Jack Kirby ===
From 1949 until his retirement, Jack Kirby worked out of a ten-foot-wide basement studio dubbed "The Dungeon" by his family. When starting with a clean piece of Bristol board, he would first draw his panel lines with a T-square.

=== Arthur Adams ===
Arthur Adams begins drawing thumbnail layouts from the script he is given, either at home or in a public place. The thumbnails range in size from 2 inches x 3 inches to half the size of the printed comic book. He or an assistant will then enlarge the thumbnails and trace them onto illustration board with a non-photo blue pencil, sometimes using a Prismacolor light-blue pencil, because it is not too waxy, and erases easily. When working on the final illustration board, he does so on a large drawing board when in his basement studio, and a lapboard when sitting on his living room couch. After tracing the thumbnails, he will then clarify details with another light-blue pencil, and finalize the details with a Number 2 pencil. He drew the first three chapters of "Jonni Future" at twice the printed comic size, and also drew the fifth chapter, "The Garden of the Sklin", at a size larger than standard, in order to render more detail than usual in those stories. For a large poster image with a multitude of characters, he will go over the figure outlines with a marker in order to emphasize them. He will use photographic reference when appropriate, as when he draws things that he is not accustomed to. Because a significant portion of his income is derived from selling his original artwork, he is reluctant to learn how to produce his work digitally.

=== Jim Lee ===
Jim Lee is known to use F lead for his pencil work.

=== J. Scott Campbell ===
J. Scott Campbell does his pencil with a lead holder, and Sanford Turquoise H lead, which he uses for its softness and darkness, and for its ability to provide a "sketchy" feel, with a minimal amount of powdery lead smearing. He uses this lead because it strikes a balance between too hard, and therefore not dark enough on the page, and too soft, and therefore prone to smearing and crumbling. Campbell avoids its closest competitor because he finds it too waxy. Campbell has also used HB lead and F lead. He maintains sharpness of the lead with a Berol Turquoise sharpener, changing them every four to six months, which he finds is the duration of their grinding ability. Campbell uses a combination of Magic Rub erasers, eraser sticks, and since he began to ink his work digitally, a Sakura electric eraser. He often sharpens the eraser to a cornered edge in order to render fine detailed work.

=== Travis Charest ===
Travis Charest uses mainly 2H lead to avoid smearing, and sometimes HB lead. He previously illustrated on regular illustration board provided by publishers, though he disliked the non-photo blue lines printed on them. By 2000, he switched to Crescent board for all his work, because it does not warp when wet, produces sharper illustrations, and are more suitable for framing because they lack the non-photo blue lines. Charest usually prefers not to employ preliminary sketching practices, such as layouts, thumbnails or lightboxing, in part due to impatience, and in part because he enjoys the serendipitous nature in which artwork develops when produced with greater spontaneity. He also prefers to use reference only when rendering objects that require a degree of real-life accuracy, such as guns, vehicles, or characters of licensed properties that must resemble actors with whom they are closely identified, as when he illustrated the cover to Star Trek: The Next Generation: Embrace the Wolf in 2000.

=== Adam Hughes ===
The penciling process that artist Adam Hughes employs for his cover work is the same he uses when doing sketches for fans at conventions, with the main difference being that he does cover work in his sketchbook, before transferring the drawing to virgin art board with a lightbox, whereas he does convention drawings on 11 x 14 Strathmore bristol, as he prefers penciling on the rougher, vellum surface rather than smooth paper, preferring smoother paper only for brush inking. He does preliminary undersketches with a lead holder, because he feels regular pencils get worn down to the nub too quickly. As he explained during a sketch demonstration at a comic book convention, during this process he uses a Sanford Turquoise 4B lead, a soft lead, though when working at home in Atlanta, where the humid weather tends to dampen the paper, he sometimes uses a B lead or 2B lead, which acts like a 4B in that environment. However, his website explains that he uses 6B lead, with some variation. For pieces rendered entirely in pencil, he employs a variety of pencil leads of varying degrees of hardness. After darkening in the construction lines that he wishes to keep, he erases the lighter ones with a kneaded eraser before rendering greater detail. For more detailed erasures, he uses a pencil-shaped white eraser, and to erase large areas, he uses a larger, hand-held white eraser, the Staedtler Mars plastic, which he calls a "thermonuclear eraser", because it "takes care of everything".

=== Joe Quesada ===
Artist and former Marvel Comics editor-in-chief Joe Quesada begins with sketches much smaller than the actual size at which he will render the final drawing. He employs a Cintiq drawing tablet when he desires to do a "tighter" digital layout of an illustration. When sketching figures, he will sometimes use photographic reference, and incorporate the photos directly into his sketches during the process of finalizing a layout. Once he makes a final decision on a layout, he will then print it out at full size, and use a light box to pencil it, sometimes altering elements in the design such as lighting or other details.

=== Bryan Hitch ===
Bryan Hitch begins with multiple rough sketches employing different camera angles on paper with a blue pencil, which traditionally does not photocopy or scan, and then selects the desired elements from the rough sketch with a graphite pencil. After picking the initial shapes, he will further emphasize his selections with colored pens, continuing to attempt different variations. He will then, depending on how late in the day it is, either redraw the illustration on a sheet of layout paper or use his lightbox to tighten and clean up the drawing, emphasizing that the lightbox should not be a mere exercise in tracing, but an opportunity to refine or change elements in the drawing to make it "clean" enough to be inked.

When Hitch transfers the drawing to the final art board, he does initial layouts with a 2H pencil, which he feels provides the necessary accuracy and detail, and uses an erasable blue pencil to mark panel frames and vanishing points, which he introduces after the rough stage. He chooses not to put too much time or polish into this stage, preferring to work quickly, lightly and instinctively. He uses a mechanical pencil with 0.9mm 2H lead at this stage for fine outlines and detail work, and a traditional pencil for more organic work, including softer lines, shading large areas and creating more fluid motion. The "best tool of all", according to him, is a traditional pencil cut with a craft knife, which he says can produce a variety of marks, and be used for detail, shading and general sketching. Hitch believes the best results combine both the mechanical and the knife-sharpened traditional pencil.

Hitch is particular about his studio workspace, which does not contain a TV or sofa, stating that such things belong in the lounge for relaxation. Despite using a professional drawing board, he emphasizes that any inexpensive board large enough to hold the paper is sufficient, as he mostly uses a piece of roughly cut chip-board leaning on the edge of his desk. He uses an Apple iMac desktop computer, flatbed scanner and Photoshop to modify his artwork digitally.

=== Simone Bianchi ===
In contrast to Hitch's work environment, artist Simone Bianchi says that he cannot work unless he is listening to music, which he does via stereo speakers placed above his drawing board, and an extensive music collection in his studio. Bianchi uses extensive photo reference and a lightbox to give his artwork a realistic look. He uses a wooden drawing board that he used to draw on flat, but angled it due to back pain that he began having in 2006.

=== Marc Silvestri ===
Another artist who listens to music while working is Marc Silvestri, who says that he listens to down-tempo chill music while working, in contrast to the alternative rock he listens to at other times.

=== Erik Larsen ===
On the Biography & Bibliography page of his website, Erik Larsen explains that he uses a Staedtler Mars Lumograph 100 2H pencil, and a Staedtler Mars Plastic Eraser. However, on the site's Frequently Asked Questions page, he states that he uses a standard Dixon Ticonderoga #2 pencil with HB lead, explaining, "It's mushy as all hell but it doesn't slow me down like a harder pencil would."

=== Amanda Conner ===
While reading each page of a script, artist Amanda Conner does tiny thumbnail sketches with stick figures corresponding to the story indicated on each page, in order to help her design the page's layout. She then does tighter, more elaborate sketches, though still fairly small compared with the finished artwork, approximately 4 in × 6 in (100 mm × 150 mm), and then blows those up on a photocopier to the proper original comic art size, which is 10 inches x 15 inches. She then uses "very tight pencils" to light-box it onto Bristol board, if she intends to have it inked by her husband and collaborator, Jimmy Palmiotti, but will do the pencils "lighter and looser" if she intends to ink it herself, as she already knows how she wants the artwork rendered. Conner has created her own paper stock and blue line format on her drawing paper, because, she explains, she likes having those configurations pre-printed on the page, and feels that "sometimes the rough is too toothy and the smooth is too slick." The stock she uses is the 10 in × 15 in (250 mm × 380 mm) Strathmore 500 series, but she also orders a custom 8 in × 12 in (200 mm × 300 mm) stock because she sometimes finds those dimensions more comfortable and easier to work on more quickly. She also finds the Strathmore 300 series "pretty good" likes its nice texture and greater affordability, but says that must occasionally content with getting a "bleedy batch". Conner uses mechanical pencils with .03 lead because she found it easier to use than regular pencils that require her to stop and sharpen them frequently.

=== Gene Ha ===
Once artist Gene Ha obtains a script, he makes "tiny" thumbnail sketches of each page, and then makes layout sketches on shrunked copies of comic art board, two per page. It is at this stage that he works out the light/dark balance of the page. Though he says about 90% of his artwork are done without photo reference, he will sometimes photograph his friends pose as the central characters, or use a full-length mirror to draw himself. He renders minor characters from his imagination. Irrespective of how much sunlight he has on a given day, he prefers to use a 500W incandescent photo lamp, though he believes a 500W halogen lamp is also adequate. He prefers to use a lead holder with H lead for sketching, and 2B lead for shading, which he sharpens with a rotary lead pointer, believing that such leads can be sharpened better than a traditional pencil. He blows up a scan of each page layout to 8.5 in × 11 in (220 mm × 280 mm), and draws "tight" pencils on top of these, which are then scanned and printed on 11 in × 17 in (280 mm × 430 mm) inkjet paper in faint blue line. He prefers Xerox paper because he feels that the surface of marker paper tends to get smudgy or oily. When importing art to modify in his computer, he uses Photoshop.

=== Jason Shiga ===
Artist Jason Shiga penciled his 2011 graphic novel Empire State: A Love Story (Or Not) with a yellow No. 2 pencil on copy paper, before transferring it with brushed ink via a lightbox.

=== Jonathan Luna ===
Artist Jonathan Luna uses 14 x 17 Strathmore Bristol board, which he cuts into 11 x 17 pieces on which to draw. He draws using a 2H pencil, and after inking his pencils with a Micron pen, he edits his line work on a graphics tablet.

=== Marcio Takara ===
Artist Marcio Takara begins his pages with 7 in × 5 in (180 mm × 130 mm) ink thumbnail sketches with which he shows his overall ideas to his editor. When he begins the actual pencils, he keeps them "loose", because he will eventually ink over them himself, and does not require greater specificity. The penciling stage is the fastest stage for Takara, who does all of his pencil work with an HB 0.5 mechanical pencil, completing two or three penciled pages a day, sometimes even inking all three by the end of the day.

=== Frank Cho ===
Frank Cho produces his artwork on Strathmore 300 Series Bristol Pad, which has a vellum surface. To pencil his artwork, Cho uses a Pentel mechanical pencil with 0.7mm HB lead. For erasure, he uses both a Vanish eraser and a kneaded eraser.

=== Chris Samnee ===
Artist Chris Samnee uses 300 series two-ply Strathmore Bristol board. He does not use non-photo blue pencils or any other equipment purchased at specialty stores for preliminary sketching, but uses .9 mm mechanical pencils that he purchases from Target. He describes his pencils as "just awful", and inks them himself, as he cannot envision giving them to someone else to ink.

=== Chuck Austen ===
Writer/artist Chuck Austen did his work on Elektra entirely on a computer. He prefers uses mostly Macintoshes, but also uses PCs. When using a Mac, he uses Ray Dream Studio, and when using a PC, usings 3D Studio Max. These allow him to take three-dimensional models and break them down into simplified two-tone line forms. He purchases the models from catalogues, or uses ones that he built for Strips using in Hash or Animation:Master. After importing the models into Studio or Max, he arranges the angles and other aspects of the scene before rendering them, such as placement of background objects or modifying gestures, while the computer corrects elements such as perspective, foreshortening, proportions, etc. After the files are rendered to Austen's satisfaction, he assembles them into page form using Photoshop, completing details that the modeling programs cannot perfect, such as facial expressions, hair, filling in blacks, rendering clothes and wrinkles, etc. To finish the art, he will either print out the "pencils" directly onto Bristol board and finalize them with an HB Tombow pencil and ink them with a #2 nib, or will apply the finishes in Photoshop.

=== Scott McCloud ===
Scott McCloud also does his work almost entirely on a graphics tablet. Although he sketches his layouts in pencil, the remainder of his work is done digitally, explaining in his 2006 book Making Comics that he had not used traditional materials like Bristol board, pens or brushes in years. After sketching layouts, which he says are "pretty tight", and include the full script, he scans them into an 18-inch tablet/monitor to use them as a guide for lettering them in Adobe Illustrator. After completing the lettering, he exports the files to Photoshop, where he fully renders the art at a resolution of 1,200 dpi, creating between five and fifty layers of finished art before flattening it into a single black and white bitmap, plus a greyscale page, if needed.

=== Fiona Staples ===
Another artist who does her work almost entirely digitally is Fiona Staples, who switched to that process several years prior to beginning her work on Saga, though her process for that series is different from previous ones, for which she characterizes it as "one intense, ongoing experiment." She begins with thumbnails, roughly drawn on printed paper templates. During this stage Staples does not use reference, but does so later in the inking stage. During the thumbnail stage, she gives copious thought to the layouts and staging, making it, in her words, the most important part of the process. After scanning the thumbnails, she enlarges them and uses them as rudimentary pencils, and "inks" over them in Manga Studio, and later colors the art in Photoshop. One of the advantages Staples sees in working digitally is the ability to dispense with tight pencils in favor of making corrections in an ad hoc manner, as she finds penciling in great detail and drawing such art a second time in ink to be boring.

== Workflow and style ==
A comic book penciller usually works closely with the comic book's editor, who commissions a script from the writer and sends it to the penciller.

Comic book scripts can take a variety of forms. Some writers, such as Alan Moore, produce complete, elaborate, and lengthy outlines of each page. Others send the artist only a plot outline consisting of no more than a short overview of key scenes with little or no dialogue. Stan Lee was known to prefer this latter form, and thus it came to be known as the Marvel Method.

Sometimes a writer or another artist (such as an art director) will include basic layouts, called "breakdowns," to assist the penciller in scene composition. If no breakdowns are included, then it falls to the penciller to determine the layout of each page, including the number of panels, their shapes and their positions. Even when these visual details are indicated by a script, a penciller may feel when drawing the scene that there is a different way of composing the scene, and may disregard the script, usually following consultation with the editor and/or writer.

Some artists use a loose pencilling approach, in which the penciller does not take much care to reduce the vagaries of the pencil art, leaving it to the inker to interpret the penciller's intent. In those cases, the penciller is usually credited with "breakdowns" or "layouts" and the inker is credited as the "embellisher" or "finisher". According to former Marvel editor Gregory Wright, John Buscema was a noted penciler whose breakdowns included all the structural essentials that enabled inkers to complete the art. Other pencillers prefer to create detailed pages, where every nuance that they expect to see in the inked art is indicated. This is known as tight pencilling.

== See also ==
- Letterer
- Colorist
