= Farmhand (comics) =

American comic book

- Ezekiel and his wife on a variant cover of the first issue.

Publication information
- Publisher: Image Comics
- Schedule: Monthly
- Format: Ongoing series
- Publication date: July 2018 – October 2025
- No. of issues: 26

Creative team
- Created by: Rob Guillory
- Written by: Rob Guillory
- Artist: Rob Guillory
- Letterer: Kody Chamberlain
- Colorist: Taylor Wells

Collected editions
- Reap What Was Sown: ISBN 978-1534309852

Farmhand is an American comic book created, written, and illustrated by Rob Guillory with letterer Kody Chamberlain and colorist Taylor Wells. It has been published in monthly installments and paperback collections by Image Comics since July 2018.

In the story, a Louisiana farmer named Jedidiah receives a vision and creates a plant which can grow replacement limbs and organs for human beings. The plot begins several years later when his estranged adult son, Ezekiel, returns home to join the family business. Many outside agents, including foreign and domestic government operatives, are after the secret of Jedidiah's seed. Meanwhile, Jedidiah's former partner, Thorne, has been covertly introducing the seed into the wild and is elected mayor.

Farmhand debuted to mostly positive reviews. Critics were divided on the effectiveness of the story's pacing but praised the combination of humor and horror elements. The story is told with a cartoon-like art style and often features visual gags.

== Publication history ==
=== Development ===
Guillory began working on Farmhand in December 2016, about a month after the conclusion of Chew, a comic he illustrated for writer John Layman. At the time, Guillory was best known for his artwork on Chew, but prior to starting comic book he had written his own material. He asked many writer/artist professionals what their routines were like so he could refine his own process. While he fine-tuned the project, only a few close friends knew about it. When he first mentioned the concept to Layman, Layman cautioned against doing it so soon to avoid being typecast as "the guy who does really weird stories". He did not let anyone at Image Comics know about it until mid 2017.

Guillory had been following Biological engineering for years and was generally skeptical about it. He wanted to explore the dark side of scientific exploration in a manner similar to Frankenstein and Jurassic Park, but designed the story to suit his artistic strengths. Although he researched biological engineering and cloning, he admits to "a good bit of extrapolation and imagination" in Farmhand. The initial idea, a tree growing human limbs, had occurred to Guillory in January 2016. He began writing script for the first five issues in a full screenplay format in late 2016 and early 2017. He tried to keep Farmhand slow paced and grounded, with straightforward and linear storytelling. Instead of an official editor, Guillory uses friends as sounding boards. He did not begin drawing until 2018. The large gap in time allowed him to distance himself from the work and approach it as though it were written by someone else. Guillory can pencil and ink at a rate close to one page per day. He works with his coloring assistant from Chew, Taylor Wells, to help maintain a regular schedule.

The series was formally announced in February 2018 at the Image Expo with an expected length of 20 issues. By the time the series went on sale, the estimated length was revised to 24 or 30 issues over a period of three to four years.

=== Publication ===
Prior to wide release, a full-color, 16-page ashcan edition was available at the April 2018 C2E2 convention in Chicago, Illinois. The first issue was promoted on the cover of the May 2018 Previews catalog from Diamond Distribution, then released on July 11, 2018. Comic specialty stores ordered around 27,000 copies of the first issue. Initial sales were strong, and the second issue received a second printing.

After the fifth issue was released in November 2018, the series went on a scheduled hiatus. In the letter column, Guillory wrote that the series would be released in segments, with a set of monthly issues followed by a gap of a few months. During the gaps, which will occur at appropriate breaks in the narrative, a square-bound collection reprinting the previous segment will be released. The first collection, "Reap What Was Sown", was released January 16, 2019. The series returned to a monthly schedule in March 2019.

== Characters and setting ==
The names of the main character, Ezekiel (Zeke), and his father, Jedidiah, were chosen partly for being old fashioned names still common in rural parts of the United States, but also for the biblical connotations which are intentional and significant for both characters. Zeke's career as a writer is integral to his role in the story. The main focus of Farmhand is an effort at reconciliation between them. Zeke's sister, Andrea, is Guillory's favorite character. At the start of the story, every character is broken physically or spirit in some way.

The story is set in Freetown, Louisiana, which is a real place near Guillory's home in Lafayette. Guillory chose to use a black farmer in a Southern setting to subvert the connotations of slavery associated with the imagery.

== Reception ==
The series debuted to mostly positive reviews. The first issue averaged 8.6 out of 10 according to review aggregator Comic Book Roundup, and the series overall averaged 8.5 after five issues. Guillory said the initial response he received from readers was surprise; they had expected the story to be pure humor and were shocked to discover the characters had real depth. Adventures in Poor Taste called Farmhand "one of the most unique comics" of its time. That sentiment was echoed by Newsarama, who said the story would evoke a strong opinion from every reader, but that not all of those opinions would be positive.

Critics were divided on early story developments. Multiversity Comics felt using the opening five pages of the first issue for a dream sequence was effective but inefficient. The narrative pace was praised by Comic Watch for its creative exposition, but criticized by Comics Bulletin and Bleeding Cool. Characterization was also a point of contention, with Bleeding Cool feeling the characters were not advancing while Comic Bastards said Guillory had done "a wonderful job of establishing" them.

Critics were united in regards to the book's tone, however. When discussing the way Farmhand moves from comedy to horror, the tonal shifts were described as "impressive" by ComicBook.com and Multiversity. Adventures in Poor Taste called Guillory a "master of tone". Most of the reviewers credited the cartoon-like art style for the flexibility because it facilitated elements of comedy, horror, and family drama.

Guillory's art is highly stylized and described as an acquired taste by Comic Bastards. He incorporates visual gags and background jokes, which is not a common trait in comic books. Bleeding Cool credits colorist Taylor Wells with giving the art personality and cites Guillory's style as a weakness when he attempts subtlety. Multiversity Comics noted how Farmhand is an ugly world filled with filthy-looking people with the exception of Ezekiel, who "looks like a sexy version of Rob Guillory" Other reviewers also commented on the similarity between the artist and the lead character, prompting Guillory to deny the resemblance. He attributes the perception to the lack of diverse character types in comic books.

== Television adaptation ==
Other parties have been interested in the media rights since the project was announced. In 2018, plans for a live-action television show were in motion and Guillory was hoping to co-write the pilot episode.

== Collected editions ==
| # | Title | Release date | Collected issues | Cover price | ISBN | Ref |
|---|---|---|---|---|---|---|
| 1 | Farmhand, Volume 1: Reap What Was Sown | January 2019 | Farmhand #1–5 | $12.99 | ISBN 978-1534309852 | |
| 2 | Farmhand, Volume 2: Thorne In The Flesh | September 2019 | Farmhand #6-10 | $16.99 | ISBN 9781534313323 | |
| 3 | Farmhand, Volume 3: Roots Of All Evil | June 2020 | Farmhand #11-15 | $16.99 | ISBN 9781534315907 | |
| 4 | Farmhand, Volume 4: The Seed | October 2022 | Farmhand #16-20 | $16.99 | ISBN 9781534323353 | |
