= Rob Guillory =

American comic book artist (b. 1982)

- Born: June 2, 1982 (age 44) Lafayette, Louisiana
- Area: Artist
- Notable works: Chew, Farmhand
- Awards: Eisner Award, Harvey Award

Robert Guillory (born June 2, 1982) is an American comic book artist known for his art on Chew, published by Image Comics. He currently writes and draws Farmhand published by Image Comics and writes Mosely published by Boom! Studios.

== Early life and education ==
Guillory was born and raised in Lafayette, Louisiana. He made his first comics on construction paper at the age of four.

He attended University of Louisiana at Lafayette, where he studied computer animation and drew for the college newspaper.

== Career ==
Rob Guillory first came to prominence as the illustrator of Chew, written by John Layman. Guillory handled pencils, inks, and colors, garnering him the 2010 Harvey Award for best new talent; Guillory would illustrate the story arcs Taster's Choice, International Flavor, Just Desserts, Flambé, Major League Chew, Space Cakes, Bad Apples, Family Recipes, Chicken Tenders, Blood Puddin', The Last Suppers, Sour Grapes, and Outer Darkness/Chew over the course of the series.

Chew also won the 2010 Harvey Award for best new series, Eisner Award for Best New Series in 2010, the Eisner Award for Best Ongoing Series in 2011, and was nominated for, but did not win, two 2010 Eagle Awards (Favourite New Comicbook and Favourite American Colour Comicbook).

Instead of pursuing more work-for-hire jobs after Chew ended in 2016, Guillory opted to launch a new creator-owned science fiction series Farmhand at Image Comics." The series, written, penciled and inked by Guillory with colors by Taylor Wells, tells the story of a "body farmer" who grows human organs.

Guillory began working on Farmhand in December 2016, about a month after the conclusion of Chew. At the time, Guillory was best known for his artwork on Chew, but prior to starting that series he had written his own material. He asked many writer/artist professionals what their routines were like so he could refine his own process. Guillory says he writes detailed full scripts "as if I was writing for a different artist." While he fine-tuned the project, only a few close friends knew about it. When he first mentioned the concept to Layman, Layman cautioned against doing it so soon to avoid being typecast as "the guy who does really weird stories". He did not let anyone at Image Comics know about it until mid 2017.

Farmhand debuted to mostly positive reviews. The first issue averaged 8.6 out of 10 according to review aggregator Comic Book Roundup, and the series overall averaged 8.5 after five issues. Guillory said the initial response he received from readers was surprise; they had expected the story to be pure humor and were shocked to discover the characters had real depth.

In April 2022, Guillory was reported among the more than three dozen comics creators who contributed to Operation USA's benefit anthology book, Comics for Ukraine: Sunflower Seeds, a project spearheaded by IDW Publishing Special Projects Editor Scott Dunbier, whose profits would be donated to relief efforts for Ukrainian refugees resulting from the February 2022 Russian invasion of Ukraine. Guillory and John Layman teamed up to contribute a new Chew story to the anthology.

Guillory launched an additional creator-owned title, Mosley from Boom! Studios in January 2023. The science fiction/fantasy series is illustrated by Sam Lotfi and was Guillory's debut as a writer but not artist on a title.

== Personal life ==
Guillory lives in Lafayette, Louisiana, where he was born and raised. He is married and has three children.

== Bibliography ==
- Chew #1-60 (Image Comics, 2009-2016)
- Farmhand #1-26 (Image Comics, 2018-2025)
- Mosely #1-5 (Boom! Studios, 2023)
- The Boo Hag (Compulsion Games, 2024)
