= Non-photo blue =

Shade of blue not detected by film

Colour coordinates
- Hex triplet: #A4DDED
- sRGB^{B} (r, g, b): (164, 221, 237)
- HSV (h, s, v): (193°, 31%, 93%)
- CIELCh_{uv} (L, C, h): (85, 34, 214°)
- ISCC–NBS descriptor: Very light greenish blue
- B: Normalized to [0–255] (byte)

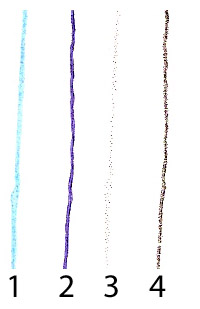
(1) Colour copy of non-photo blue pencil. (2) Colour copy of blue pen. (3) Grayscale copy of non-photo blue pencil. (4) Grayscale copy of blue pen.

Non-photo blue (or non-repro blue) is a common tool in the graphic design and print industry, being a particular shade of blue that cannot be detected by graphic arts camera film. This allows layout editors to write notes to the print operator on the print flat (the image that is to be photographed and sent to print) which will not show in the final form. It also allows artists to lay down sketch lines without the need to erase after inking.

== Change in function ==
More recently, with digital image scanning and image manipulation, non-photo blue fulfills its function in a different way. The artist can do their sketch and inking in the traditional manner and scan the page. Most scanners will detect the light blue lines. However, shifting to greyscale and increasing the contrast and brightness of the scanned image reduces the appearance of the blue tones. Another common approach involves replacing the blue channel with another channel – typically the red channel. The exact processes may differ depending on the scanner, settings and image-editing software, but the concept remains the same.

== Black ink ==
The difference between the non-photo blue and black ink is great enough that digital image manipulation can separate the two easily. If a black-and-white bitmap setting is scanned in, the exposure or threshold number can be set high enough to detect the black ink or dark images being scanned, but low enough to leave out the non-photo blue. On a threshold scale of 0–255, this number would be approximately 140. Only with a considerably low threshold setting will the blue be detected; this however may greatly distort black lines and add a lot of noise and black speckles, making the image potentially almost unrecognizable. Scanning in black-and-white makes it possible for the non-photo blue still to serve its original purpose, as notes and rough sketching lines can be placed throughout the image being scanned and remain undetected by the scan head.

== See also ==
- Blue pencil (editing)
- List of colours
