= Freight Farms =

Agriculture tech company

- Industry: Agriculture
- Founded: 2011; 14 years ago in Worcester, Massachusetts
- Founders: Jon Friedman; Brad McNamara
- Defunct: May 1, 2025; 4 months ago
- Fate: Bankruptcy and liquidation
- Headquarters: Boston, Massachusetts, United States

Freight Farms was a Boston-based agriculture technology company and was the first to manufacture and sell "container farms": hydroponic farming systems retrofitted inside intermodal freight containers. Freight Farms also develops farmhand, a hydroponic farm management and automation software platform, and the largest connected network of hydroponic farmers in the world. The company has installed more than 600 farms around the world, on behalf of individuals, entrepreneurs, educational and corporate campuses, and soil farmers.

The company announced in September 2023 a business combination with Agrinam Acquisition Corporation, a special purpose acquisition corporation, as it targeted an IPO in the Toronto Stock Exchange. Despite providing a business update on its performance in 2023, the IPO is yet to go through.

On May 1, 2025, Freight Farms filed for Chapter 7 bankruptcy and liquidated its assets, followed by an immediate shutdown.

== Early history ==
In 2010, while experimenting with rooftop gardening projects in the Boston area, Jon Friedman and Brad McNamara realized that intermodal containers, common to Boston's port, would make sturdy and standardized substructures for vertical farms. Furthermore, refrigerated containers feature insulation that would make it possible to maintain internal environmental conditions year-round in any location. International adoption of freight containers for transportation also meant such a vertical farm could shipped anywhere in the world with relative ease.

In 2011, the two co-founded Freight Farms and, after a successful crowd-funding campaign on Kickstarter, hand-built the first container farm prototype on the Clark University campus in Worcester, Massachusetts.

== The Leafy Green Machine ==
In 2013, Freight Farms began to manufacture and sell container farms under the model name Leafy Green Machine (LGM).

Each Leafy Green Machine was a retrofit 40-ft. refrigerated container, and was divided into two sections: the seedling station, and the main growth area. The seedling station consisted of a multifunction worktable featuring irrigated germination shelves where seedlings sprouted from seeds. The main growth area consisted of 256 vertical crop columns, irrigated with an overhead drip hydroponic system. Each column could detach from the hydroponic circuit and lock into place on the seedling table, meaning all planting, transplanting, and harvesting could be accomplished at waist level without bending down.

Both sections were exposed to high-efficiency LED arrays that provide plants with the energy required for photosynthesis, and all excess water was recirculated, filtered, and reclaimed. The average Leafy Green Machine consumed less than five gallons of water and 125 kWh of electricity per day. A skilled farmer could grow up to four tons of food annually in one LGM.

Major sales included Google, Ford Foundation, Sodexo, Compass Group, and Square Roots.

In February 2019, Freight Farms announced that after five years and eight design iterations, the 2018 Leafy Green Machine would be succeeded by the company's next-generation container farm, the Greenery and its performance model, the Greenery S.

== The Greenery ==
Freight Farms' next-generation container farm was conceptualized based on feedback from existing farmers, and organized around three design goals: better yields, improved sustainability, and more IoT-connected automation. Improving on the technology and design of its predecessor, the crop columns and LED array are replaced by plant panels and LED panels respectively, which can slide laterally to accommodate larger crops or in-row farming work. The output of the LED array is also upgraded, meaning plants will grow more quickly, and the seedling table is upgraded to supply the farm with sufficient seedlings.

== Farmhand ==
Farmhand (styled "farmhand") is a software platform developed in-house by Freight Farms, designed to allow hydroponic growers to control farm components remotely, automate certain tasks, analyze past and current growing data, and manage their business. The software was originally developed for Freight Farms' customers, but is now compatible with any hydroponic operation that uses a grow controller.
