= John Layman =

American writer

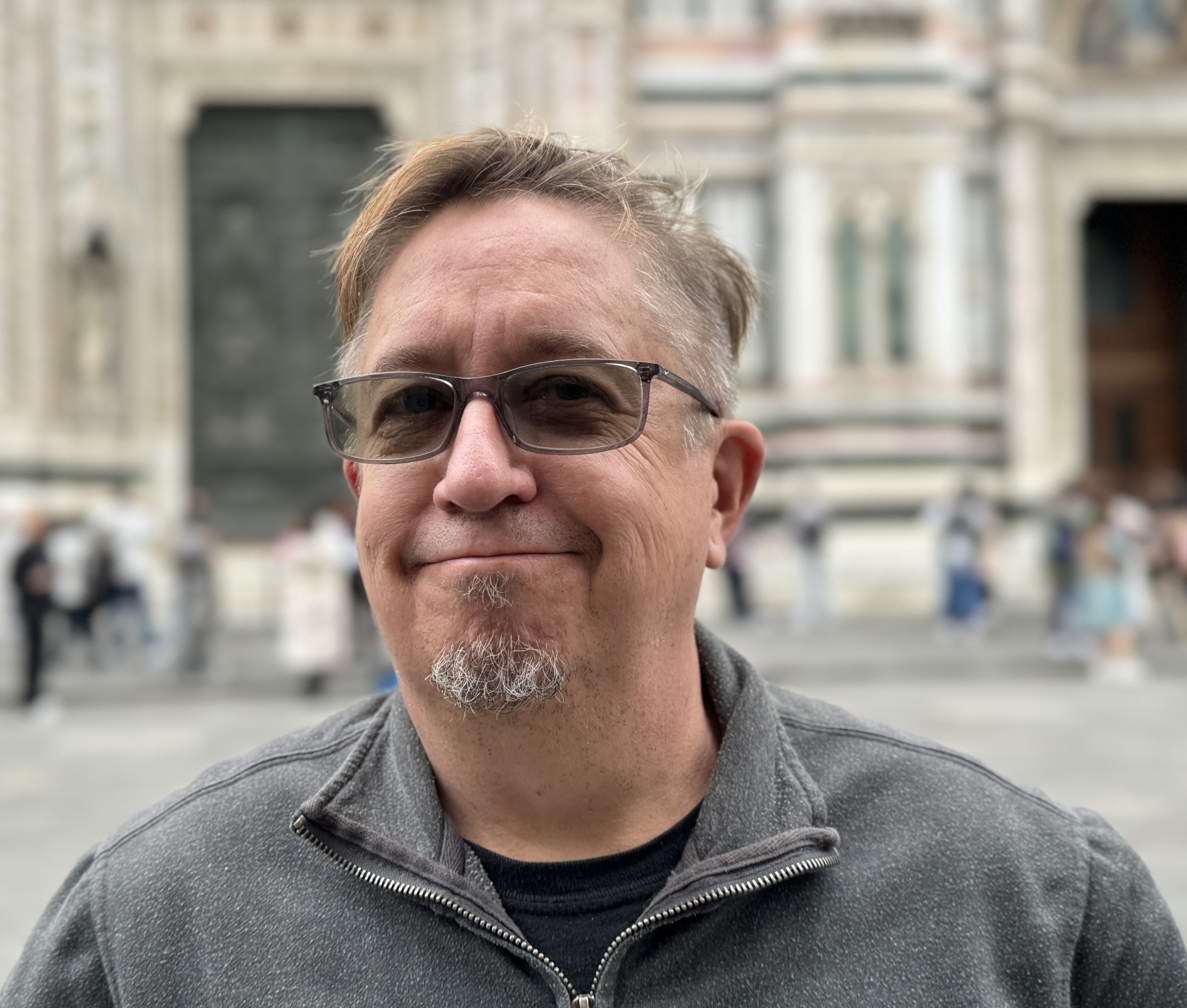
- Layman in 2025
- Born: John Steele Layman; November 13, 1967 (age 59)
- Areas: Writer, Letterer
- Notable works: Marvel Zombies vs. The Army of Darkness; Gambit; Chew (Tony Chu, Cannibal Detective); Outer Darkness; Chu (Saffron Chu); Cyclops: A Pirate's Life for Me

John Steele Layman (born November 13, 1967) is an American comic book writer and letterer. Layman is most known for his writing published by Image Comics: Chew, its spin-off/midquel series Chu (Saffron Chu), the stand-alone Outer Darkness, and the crossover series Outer Darkness/Chew, as well as the Marvel Comics series Marvel Zombies vs. The Army of Darkness, Gambit, and Cyclops: A Pirate's Life for Me.

== Career ==
Once an editor for Wildstorm, a branch of DC Comics, Layman turned to writing comics full-time in 2002, mainly for Marvel Comics.

He also worked on several comic books based on licensed properties, such as Xena: Warrior Princess and ThunderCats, as well as crossovers like Marvel Zombies vs. The Army of Darkness.

From 2007–2010 he worked as a writer for Cryptic Studios, a video game developer in Los Gatos, California.

Layman has written a number of creator-owned titles at Image Comics, such as the graphic novel Puffed, and Chew, with artist Rob Guillory. Chew has gone on to achieve much success, being nominated for two Harvey Awards, two Eagle Awards, and winning an Eisner Award for Best New Series in 2010.

In April 2022, Layman was reported among the more than three dozen comics creators who contributed to Operation USA's benefit anthology book, Comics for Ukraine: Sunflower Seeds, a project spearheaded by IDW Publishing Special Projects Editor Scott Dunbier, whose profits would be donated to relief efforts for Ukrainian refugees resulting from the February 2022 Russian invasion of Ukraine. Layman and Rob Guillory teamed up to contribute a new Chew story to the anthology.

== Bibliography ==
=== AfterShock Comics ===
- Eleanor and the Egret (#1–5)

=== Image Comics ===
- Puffed
- Stay Puffed
- Chew (Tony Chu, Cannibal Detective) #1–60 (2009 – 2016)
  - Volume 1: Tasters Choice #1–5 (with Rob Guillory, tpb, 128 pages, 2009, ISBN 1-60706-159-7)
  - Volume 2: International Flavor #6–10 (with Rob Guillory, tpb, 128 pages, 2010, ISBN 1-60706-260-7)
  - Volume 3: Just Desserts #11–15 (with Rob Guillory, tpb, 128 pages, 2010, ISBN 1-60706-335-2)
  - Volume 4: Flambé #16–20 (with Rob Guillory, tpb, 120 pages, 2011, ISBN 1-60706-398-0)
  - Volume 5: Major League Chew #21–25 (with Rob Guillory, tpb, 120 pages, 2012, ISBN 1-60706-523-1)
  - Volume 6: Space Cakes #26–30, Chew: Secret Agent Poyo one-shot (with Rob Guillory, tpb, 156 pages, 2013, ISBN 1-60706-621-1)
  - Volume 7: Bad Apples #31–35 (with Rob Guillory, tpb, 128 pages, 2013, ISBN 1-60706-767-6)
  - Volume 8: Family Recipes #36–40 (with Rob Guillory, tpb, 128 pages, 2014, ISBN 1-60706-938-5)
  - Volume 9: Chicken Tenders #41–45, Chew: Warrior Chicken Poyo one-shot (with Rob Guillory, tpb, 128 pages, 2015, ISBN 1-63215-289-4)
  - Volume 10: Blood Puddin' #46–50 (with Rob Guillory, tpb, 128 pages, 2015, ISBN 1-63215-396-3)
  - Volume 11: The Last Suppers #51–55, Chew / Revival one-shot (with Rob Guillory, tpb, 128 pages, 2015, ISBN 1-63215-681-4)
  - Volume 12: Sour Grapes Chew #56–60, Chew: Demon Chicken Poyo one-shot (with Rob Guillory, tpb, 184 pages, 2017, ISBN 978-1-5343-0031-6)
- Leviathan #1–3 (2018)
- Outer Darkness #1–12 (2018 – 2019)
  - Volume 1: Each Other's Throats #1–6 (with Afu Chan, tpb, 136 pages, 2019, ISBN 1-53431-210-2)
  - Volume 2: Castrophany of Hate #7–12 (with Afu Chan, tpb, 136 pages, 2019, ISBN 1-53431-370-2)
- Outer Darkness/Chew #1–3 (2020)
  - Outer Darkness/Chew: Fusion Cuisine (with Afu Chan and Rob Guillory, tpb, 72 pages, 2020, ISBN 1-53431-657-4)
- Chu (Saffron Chu) #1–present (2020–present)
  - Volume 1: First Course #1–5 (with Dan Boultwood, tpb, 128 pages, 2021, ISBN 978-1-5343-1774-1)
  - Volume 2: (She) Drunk History #1–5 (with Dan Boultwood, tpb, 128 pages, 2022, ISBN 978-1-5343-2003-1)

=== Wildstorm ===
- Gen13 vol. 2:
  - "When Bedbugs Bite" (with Scott Lobdell and Ed Benes, in #48, 1999)
  - "Over My Dead Body" (with Scott Lobdell, Ed Benes, Scott Benefiel, Steve Ellis and Pat Quinn, in #50, 2000)
  - "Meanwhile" (with Dan Norton, in #53, 2000)
- Wildstorm Thunderbook, anthology, "Down and Out with the Deviants" (with Jeffrey Moy, August 2000)
- Bay City Jive (limited series) (May 2001 – July 2001):
  - "The Demon-Gate Freak Out!" (with Jason Johnson, in #1–3, 2001)
- Thundercats: Dogs of War (limited series) (August 2003 – December 2003):
  - Thundercats: Dogs of War (tpb, 128 pages, 2004, ISBN 1-4012-0287-X) collects:
    - "Bone of Contention" (with Brett Booth, in #1, 2003)
    - "Hounded" (with Brett Booth, in #2, 2003)
    - "Pack of Lies" (with Brett Booth, in #3, 2003)
    - "Hand That Feeds You" (with Brett Booth, in #4, 2003)
    - "Dog Gone" (with Brett Booth, in #5, 2003)
- Thundercats: Enemy's Pride (limited series) (August 2004 – December 2004)
  - Thundercats: Enemy's Pride (tpb, 128 pages, 2005, ISBN 1-4012-0617-4) collects:
    - "Lie of The Beholder" (with Joe Vriens, in #1, 2004)
    - "Best Served Cold" (with Joe Vriens, in #2, 2004)
    - "Eye of The Tiger" (with Joe Vriens, in #3, 2004)
    - "The King and I" (with Joe Vriens, in #4, 2004)
    - "Animas Acme" (with Joe Vriens, in #5, 2004)
- Red Sonja/Claw (limited series) (March 2006 – June 2006)
  - Red Sonja/Claw The Unconquered: Devil's Hands (tpb, 112 pages, 2007, ISBN 1-4012-1210-7) collects:
    - "The Accursed" (with Andy Smith, in #1, 2006)
    - "Soul Corruption" (with Andy Smith, in #2, 2006)
    - "Divide & Conquered" (with Andy Smith, in #3, 2006)
    - "Severed Alliance" (with Andy Smith, in #4, 2006)

=== Marvel Comics ===
- X-Men Unlimited #47, "Strange Harvest" (with Dan Norton, May 2003)
- Marvel Age: Fantastic Four (October 2004 – November 2004)
  - Volume 2: Doom Digest (tpb, 96 pages, 2004, ISBN 0-7851-1550-1) collects:
    - "Invaders from Planet X" (with Ryan Odagawa, in #7, 2004)
    - "Prisoners of the Puppet Master" (with Joseph Dodd, in #8, 2004)
- Gambit vol. 4 #1–12 (September 2004 – June 2005)
  - Volume 1: House of Cards (tpb, 144 pages, 2005, ISBN 0-7851-1522-6) collects:
    - "The Prodigal Sinner" (with Georges Jeanty, in #1, 2004)
    - "Player's Club" (with Georges Jeanty, in #2, 2004)
    - "Slight of Hand" (with Georges Jeanty, in #3, 2004)
    - "Bet Your Life" (with Georges Jeanty, in #4, 2004)
    - "Celebrity Poker" (with Georges Jeanty, in #5, 2004)
    - "Backstabber's Rhapsody" (with Roger Robinson, in #6, 2005)
  - Volume 2: Hath No Fury (tpb, 144 pages, 2005, ISBN 0-7851-1747-4) collects:
    - "Voodoo Economics" (with Georges Jeanty, in #7–9, 2005)
    - "X, Lies and Videotape" (with Georges Jeanty, in #10, 2005)
    - "Thieves' World" (with Roger Robinson and Georges Jeanty, in #11–12, 2005)
- The Pulse: House of M and The Pulse Special Edition #1 (with among other artist, June 2005)
- Fantastic Four: House of M (limited series) (July 2005 – September 2005):
  - House of M: Fantastic Four/Iron Man (tpb, 144 pages, 2006, ISBN 0-7851-1923-X) collects:
    - "A Doctor in the House" (with Scot Eaton, in #1, 2005)
    - "Four the Hard Way" (with Scot Eaton, in #2, 2005)
    - "King For A Day" (with Scot Eaton, in #3, 2005)
- Sentinel Squad O*N*E (limited series) (January 2006 – May 2006)
  - Decimation: Sentinel Squad O.N.E (tpb, 120 pages, 2006, ISBN 0-7851-1997-3) collects:
    - "Tin Can Heroes" (with Aaron Lopresti, in #1–5, 2006)
- Marvel Zombies vs. The Army of Darkness (limited series) (March 2007 – July 2007)
  - Marvel Zombies vs. Army of Darkness (hc, 128 pages, 2007, ISBN 0-7851-2743-7) collects:
    - "Earth's Mightiest Zero" (with Fabiano Neves, in #1, 2007)
    - "Marvel Team-Ups" (with Fabiano Neves, in #2, 2007)
    - "Night of the Livid Dead" (with Fabiano Neves, in #3, 2007)
    - "The Book of Dooms" (with Fabiano Neves, Fernando Blanco and Sean Phillips, in #4, 2007)
    - "The Stalking Dead" (with Fabiano Neves, Fernando Blanco and Sean Phillips, in #5, 2007)
- Shadowland: Bullseye, one-shot, "Bullseye: Dead on a Rival" (with Sean Chen, August 2010) collected in Street Heroes (hc, 192 pages, 2011, ISBN 0-7851-4887-6)
- Women of Marvel #1, "Love & Illusion" (with Davide Gianfelice, January 2011)
- Identity Wars (hc, 112 pages, 2011, ISBN 0-7851-5568-6) collects:
  - The Amazing Spider-Man Annual #38, "Part 1" (with Lee Garbett, April 2011)
  - Deadpool Annual #1, "Part 2" (with Juan Doe, May 2011)
  - The Incredible Hulks Annual #1, "Part 3" (with Al Barrionuevo, June 2011)
- Cyclops vol. 3 #6–12 (October 2014 – April 2015)
  - Volume 2: A Pirate's Life for Me #6–12 (tpb, 160 pages, 2015, ISBN 0-7851-9076-7)
- Guardians Team-Up #4 (with Otto Schmidt, April 2015)

=== Oni Press ===
- Armageddon & Son (graphic novel, with Dave Dumeer, tpb, 96 pages, November 2005, ISBN 1-93266-433-5)
- Stephen Colbert's Tek Jansen (limited series) (July 2007 – May 2009)
  - Stephen Colbert's Tek Jansen (tpb, 136 pages, 2009, ISBN 1-93496-416-6) collects:
    - "Invasion of the Optiklons!" (with Tom Peyer, Jim Massey, Scott Chantler and Robbi Rodriguez, in #1, 2007)
    - "Return to Space Academy!; Danger Express To Doom" (With Jim Massey, Tom Peyer, Robbi Rodrigez and Matt Wagner, in #2, 2008)
    - "Evil Has 1000 Eyes; Depth & The Maidens" (With Jim Massey, Tom Peyer, Robbi Rodrigez and Darwyn Cooke, in #3, 2008)
    - "Too Many Jansens; Born To Be Hyperwild" (with Tom Peyer and Robbi Rodrigez, in #4, 2009)
    - "The Army of Doom at the Nebula of Death!" (with Jim Massey, Tom Peyer and Robbi Rodrigez, in #5, 2009)

=== Dynamite Entertainment ===
- Xena Warrior Princess: Contest of Pantheons (limited series) (July 2006 – August 2007)
  - Xena Warrior Princess Volume 1: Contest of Pantheons (tpb, 104 pages, 2007, ISBN 1-93330-535-5) collects:
    - "Holy Arcrimony" (with Fabiano Neves, in #1, 2006)
    - "Pantheon Pandemonium" (with Fabiano Neves, in #2, 2006)
    - "Stalk Like an Egyptian" (with Fabiano Neves, in #3, 2006)
    - "Undead Reckoning" (with Fabiano Neves, in #4, 2006)
- Xena Warrior Princess: Dark Xena (limited series) (May 2007 – August 2007)
  - Xena Warrior Princess Volume 2: Dark Xena (tpb, 144 pages, 2008, ISBN 978-1-933305-61-5) collects:
    - "The Way We Were" (with Noah Salonga, in #1, 2007)
    - "(Re)Born Bad" (with Noah Salonga, in #2, 2007)
    - "Partners in Crime" (with Noah Salonga, in #3, 2007)
    - "Unwritten History" (with Noah Salonga, in #4, 2007)
- Army of Darkness/Xena: Warrior Princess (limited series) (March 2008 – July 2008)
  - Volume 1: Why not? (tpb, 104 pages, 2009, ISBN 1-60690-008-0) collects:
    - "Battered & Bruced, Part One: The Grimmest Fairy Tale" (with Fabiano Neves, in #1, 2008)
    - "Battered & Bruced, Part Two: Autolykness Adventures" (with Fabiano Neves, in #2, 2008)
    - "Battered & Bruced, Part Three: From These Ashes" (with Fabiano Neves, in #3, 2008)
    - "Battered & Bruced, Part Four: The Best Laid Plans…" (with Fabiano Neves, in #4, 2008)

=== IDW Publishing ===
- Scarface: Scarred for Life (limited series) (December 2006 – April 2007)
  - Scarface: Scarred For Life (tpb, 128 pages, 2007, ISBN 978-1-60010-087-1) collects:
    - "City of Zeroes" (with Dave Crosland, in #1, 2006)
    - "The Scum Also Rises" (with Dave Crosland, in #2, 2007)
    - "Everybody Angles" (with Dave Crosland, in #3, 2007)
    - "Mutually Assured Destruction" (with Dave Crosland, in #4, 2007)
    - "Top O' The Heap, End O' The Line" (with Dave Crosland, in #5, 2007)
- Godzilla: Gangsters & Goliaths (limited series) (June 2011 – October 2011)
  - Godzilla: Gangsters & Goliaths (tpb, 120 pages, 2011, ISBN 1-61377-033-2) collects:
    - "Among The Monsters" (with Alberto Ponticelli, in #1, 2011)
    - "The Wronged Man" (with Alberto Ponticelli, in #2, 2011)
    - "Moth and Flame" (with Alberto Ponticelli, in #3, 2011)
    - "While Tokyo Burns" (with Alberto Ponticelli, in #4, 2011)
    - "Makoto Sato's Last Stand" (with Alberto Ponticelli, in #5, 2011)
- Mars Attacks (June 2012 – May 2013)
  - Mars Attacks Deluxe Edition, #1–10 (hc, 252 pages, 2014, ISBN 1-63140-015-0)

=== DC Comics ===
- Detective Comics vol. 2 #13–29 (October 2012 – March 2014)
  - Volume 3: Emperor Penguin (tpb, 192 pages, 2012, ISBN 1-4012-4634-6) collects:
    - "IQ Test" (with Andy Clarke, in #13, 2012)
    - "Seeds & Dirt" (with Andy Clarke, in #14, 2012)
    - "Love in Bloom" (with Andy Clarke, in #15, 2012)
    - "Pecking Order" (with Andy Clarke, in #16, 2013)
    - "Doctor's Orders" (with Andy Clarke, in #17, 2013)
    - "A Cut Above" (with Henrik Jonsson, in #18, 2013)
  - Volume 4: The Wrath (tpb, 264 pages, 2014, ISBN 1-4012-4997-3) collects:
    - "Birth of a Family" (with Andy Clarke, in #19, 2013)
    - "Birdwatching" (with Henrik Jonsson, in #19, 2013)
    - "Through A Blue Lens" (with Jason Masters, in #19, 2013)
    - "Empire of the Son" (with Andy Clarke, in #20, 2013)
    - "Territorial" (with Andy Clarke, in #21, 2013)
    - "My Better Half" (with Andy Clarke, in #22, 2013)
    - "Marital Abyss" (with Andy Clarke, in #23, 2013)
    - "State of Shock" (with Jason Fabok, in #24, 2013)
    - "Face in the Crowd" (with Joshua Williamson and Scott Eaton, in Annual #2, 2013)
    - "Contained Multitudes" (with Joshua Williamson and Szymon Kudranski, in Annual #2, 2013)
    - "Harvey Bullock, This is Your Life" (with Joshua Williamson and Derlis Santacruz, in Annual #2, 2013)
  - Volume 5: Gothtopia (hc, 176 pages, 2014, ISBN 1-4012-4998-1) collects:
    - "Whistleblower's Blues" (with Jason Fabok, in #25, 2013)
    - "Troubled Waters" (with Jorge Lucas, in #25, 2013)
    - "Crown of Fear" (with Aaron Lopresti, in #26, 2013)
    - "Gothtopia, Part One: The Perfect Crime" (with Jason Fabok, in #27, 2014)
    - "Welcome to... Gothtopia, Part Two: The Maddening Crowd" (with Aaron Lopresti, in #28, 2014)
    - "The Truth And Nothing But" (with Aaron Lopresti, in #29, 2014)
- Batman: The Dark Knight vol. 2 #23.3: Clayface, "Not Just Another Pretty Face" (with Cliff Richards, September 2013)
- Catwoman vol. 4 #25, "Before the Claws Come Out" (with Aaron Lopresti, November 2013) collected in Race of Thieves (tpb, 232 pages, 2014, ISBN 1-4012-5063-7)
- Batman Eternal (April 2014 – August 2014):
  - Volume 1 (tpb, 480 pages, 2014, ISBN 1-4012-5173-0) collects:
    - "Batman Eternal" (with Scott Snyder, James Tynion IV, Ray Fawkes, and Tim Seeley and Jason Fabok, in #1–3, 2014)
    - "Injustice For All" (with Scott Snyder, James Tynion IV, Ray Fawkes, and Tim Seeley and Dustin Nguyen, in #4, 2014)
    - "Disinfect" (with Scott Snyder, James Tynion IV, Ray Fawkes, and Tim Seeley and Andy Clarke, in #5, 2014)
    - "The Denied" (with Scott Snyder, James Tynion IV, Ray Fawkes, and Tim Seeley and Trevor McCarthy, in #6, 2014)
    - "The Sinking Of An Empire!" (with Scott Snyder, James Tynion IV, Ray Fawkes, and Tim Seeley and Emanuel Simeoni, in #7, 2014)
    - "Guided by Darkness" (with Scott Snyder, James Tynion IV, Ray Fawkes, and Tim Seeley and Guillem March, in #8, 2014)
    - "The Unburied Past" (with Scott Snyder, James Tynion IV, Ray Fawkes, and Tim Seeley and Guillem March, in #9, 2014)
    - "When Animals Attack" (with Scott Snyder, James Tynion IV, Ray Fawkes, and Tim Seeley and Riccardo Burchielli, in #10, 2014)
    - "Day of the Dads" (with Scott Snyder, James Tynion IV, Ray Fawkes, and Tim Seeley and Ian Bertram, in #11, 2014)
    - "The Good Man" (with Scott Snyder, James Tynion IV, Ray Fawkes, and Tim Seeley and Mikel Janín, in #12, 2014)
    - "Infernal Relations" (with Scott Snyder, James Tynion IV, Ray Fawkes, and Tim Seeley and Mikel Janín, in #13, 2014)
    - "Natural Order" (with Scott Snyder, James Tynion IV, Ray Fawkes, and Tim Seeley and Jason Fabok, in #14, 2014)
    - "The Common Limit" (with Scott Snyder, James Tynion IV, Ray Fawkes, and Tim Seeley and Dustin Nguyen, in #15, 2014)
    - "The Monster Machine" (with Scott Snyder, James Tynion IV, Ray Fawkes, and Tim Seeley and Dustin Nguyen, in #16, 2014)
    - "The Savior" (with Scott Snyder, James Tynion IV, Ray Fawkes, and Tim Seeley and Dustin Nguyen, in #17, 2014)
    - "A Night on Earth" (with Scott Snyder, James Tynion IV, Ray Fawkes, and Tim Seeley and Andy Clarke, in #18, 2014)
    - "Breaking Bat" (with Scott Snyder, James Tynion IV, Ray Fawkes, and Tim Seeley and Emanuel Simeoni, in #19, 2014)
    - "Wild Animals" (with Scott Snyder, James Tynion IV, Ray Fawkes, and Tim Seeley and Emanuel Simeoni, in #20, 2014)
    - "Ten Forty-Eight" (with Scott Snyder, James Tynion IV, Ray Fawkes, and Tim Seeley and Jason Fabok, in #21, 2014)
  - Suicide Squad: Kill Arkham Asylum #1-5 (limited series, with Jesús Hervás and David Baron, February 2024-June 2024) collected in tpb October 2024, ISBN 978-1-77951-838-5

=== Dark Horse Comics ===
- Aliens: Inhuman Condition (graphic novel, with Sam Kieth, hc, 56 pages, April 2013, ISBN 1-59582-618-1)

== Notes ==
Preceded by Tony S. Daniel	Detective Comics writer 2012–2014	Succeeded by Francis Manapul & Brian Buccellato
