= Chew (comics) =

American comic book series

- Cover to Chew #1 by Rob Guillory.

Publication information
- Publisher: Image Comics
- Schedule: Monthly
- Format: Ongoing series
- Genre: Action/adventure, humor/comedy
- Publication date: June 2009 – November 2016
- No. of issues: 60
- Main character(s): Tony Chu; John Colby; Mason Savoy

Creative team
- Created by: John Layman; Rob Guillory
- Written by: John Layman
- Artist: Rob Guillory
- Letterer: John Layman
- Colorists: Rob Guillory; Lisa Gonzales (#5–8); Steve Struble (#9–18); Taylor Wells (#27, 19–60)

Collected editions
- Taster's Choice: ISBN 1-60706-159-7
- International Flavor: ISBN 1-60706-260-7
- Just Desserts: ISBN 1-60706-335-2
- Flambé: ISBN 1-60706-398-0
- Major League Chew: ISBN 1-60706-523-1
- Space Cakes: ISBN 1-60706-621-1
- Bad Apples: ISBN 1-60706-767-6
- Family Recipes: ISBN 1-60706-938-5
- Chicken Tenders: ISBN 1-63215-289-4
- Blood Puddin': ISBN 1-63215-396-3
- The Last Suppers: ISBN 1-63215-681-4
- Sour Grapes: ISBN 1-5343-0031-7
- Outer Darkness/Chew: ISBN 1-5343-1657-4

Chew is an American comic book series about a U.S. Food and Drug Administration (FDA) agent, Tony Chu, who solves crimes by receiving psychic impressions from whatever he consumes as food, no matter what. It is written by John Layman with art by Rob Guillory and published by Image Comics across the storylines Taster's Choice, International Flavor, Just Desserts, Flambé, Major League Chew, Space Cakes, Bad Apples, Family Recipes, Chicken Tenders, Blood Puddin', The Last Suppers, and Sour Grapes. The series has won two Eisner Awards and two Harvey Awards.

Chew's first issue was released in June 2009, and the series concluded with its 60th issue in November 2016, with a crossover one-shot, I Hate Fairyland – I Hate Image, following in May 2017. An animated film/television adaptation starring the voices of Steven Yeun, Felicia Day, and Robin Williams began production in 2014, going into development hell following Williams' death (despite him being recast with David Tennant in 2015) and being unfinished by 2017.

In 2020, two follow-up projects were released – a three-issue crossover with Outer Darkness (another comic series written by Layman), and the beginning of a spin-off series titled Chu, comprising the "Chewniverse".

== Plot summary ==
Set in a world where all chicken and other bird meats are illegal, after a catastrophic outbreak of the bird flu that killed 23 million Americans, Chew centers on Tony Chu, a police detective who is a cibopath (pronounced "SEE-bo-path"). Tony becomes a vice cop with the Philadelphia Police Department, and when on assignment in Taster's Choice, trying to find people smuggling chicken, he enters a black market chicken restaurant on invitation from the U.S. FDA. He has a bowl of chicken soup only to find he gets a psychic impression of the cook killing people and putting them into the soup. He goes to bust the cook, only for the cook to kill himself outside the restaurant. Chu eats a bite of the cooks tongue to find out the names of the rest of the victims. He is fired from his job after the Philadelphia PD catches him eating the cook and gets hired on to the FDA by an agent named Mason Savoy, who is also a cibopath.

The first case that Tony and Savoy are assigned to is finding out what happened to a Health Inspector named Evan Pepper, based on a finger found inside of a hamburger at a fast-food restaurant. During the investigation, Tony has a hit put out on him by a businessman named Ray Jack Montero. It is eventually discovered that Mason Savoy killed Pepper and when confronted about it, bites off Tony's ear to use it as leverage in case Tony ever comes after him. Savoy runs off to discover what really caused the so-called Bird Flu, and banned all chicken consumption.

In International Flavor, Tony takes some time off and flies with his brother to an island called Yamapalu. Chu is there to investigate a certain plant called a Gallsaberry which tastes exactly like chicken. Chu meets with a United States Department of Agriculture agent, who tells Tony that she will tell him all she knows about Gallsaberry, but unfortunately she's murdered and Tony is framed. Tony has his FDA credentials checked and is released only to find out by biting another prisoner that another murder has taken place, over a rooster named Poyo, a cockfight champion. After confiscating the rooster, Tony goes to the morgue to find out more about Gallsaberries. During this time, the chief of police steals Poyo. Tony then eats a Gallsaberry raw and finds out that it is from outer space. Tony sneaks on the base where Gallsaberries are grown, evacuates several people that are imprisoned there only to find out that the entire crop of Gallsaberries are burning. It turns out that Ray Jack Montero is burning the plants to remove any competition, with a little help from some residents of Yamapalu, who are rebelling due to the capture of Poyo. Tony is shot at by an employee of Montero, but is missed, and has a confrontation with a person known as The Vampire who is also a cibopath.

In Just Desserts, Tony finds out that Poyo had been moved to America, so he retrieves him and shuts down a cockfighting ring. It is revealed that Ray Jack Montero had been changing Frog DNA to make them taste (and look) more like chickens, creating a creature called Frickens, or Chogs and packaging their meat and calling it Poult-Free, a chicken substitute. It is also revealed Montero knew that the bird-flu outbreak was going to happen before it did, so Mason Savoy had his partner, Caesar, go undercover inside of Montero's company. Caesar was the one who shot at Tony in Yamapalu and intentionally missed. Montero is captured, and Savoy is surrounded by the FDA when they were watching one of Montero's buildings. Savoy has a confrontation with John and escapes. Amelia finds a toe that was in Tony's fridge, given to him from an old girlfriend. Savoy eats Tony's ear and learns more about him, specifically that Tony has a daughter by the name of Olive. Tony brings Amelia and John with him to his family's Thanksgiving. We meet his friendlier twin sister Toni. While giving grace, there is a 2 car pile-up outside and alien writing in the sky.

A week later, in Flambé, the FDA is making the writing in the sky a priority over the chicken ban. Tony teams up with Mason's old partner Caesar to look for a former FDA agent named Migdalo Daniel who is a Voresoph, Migdalo attacked the agents and accidentally killed himself. A Kentucky Fried Chicken imitation restaurant called Mother Clucker's reopens selling chicken. Tony and Colby investigate a food fight that resulted in several students killing each other at Francis Bacon High School. It turns out that a student named Peter Pilaf has a new food related power. After detaining him, Tony finds out that Pilaf had sent a recipe to astronauts on the Fisher-Okroshka International Space Station which exploded shortly afterwards. It turns out that a servant of The Vampire on the Space Station caused the station to explode and escaped with some computer files and a Gallsaberry. While on a mission with the USDA in North Korea, Tony and Colby find out that the FDA are using Poyo as a secret weapon. Tony is transferred to NASA for the day to work with his sister, Toni. They go to Area 51, Area 51 has pieces of the Space Station including the body of an astronaut. Tony bites the astronaut and discovers The Vampire's involvement. Mason drinks Migdalo's blood, and tells Caesar that there is a connection between people with abilities and the writing in the sky. Caesar then informs Mason that the writing disappeared four days ago. Mason decides to kidnap Olive. Tony and Colby are sent to investigate an egg worshiping cult that predicted the disappearance of the sky writing to the minute. They go undercover and sneak inside the church, and while trying to steal their holy book, the other members of the church drink poisoned Kool-Aid to absolve their sin of eating chicken. The cult's book is not written in English and Tony and Colby are fired from the FDA.

In Major League Chew, Tony is transferred to the Municipal Traffic Division. His new boss seems very excited to have him there. Tony then helps to arrest a gang of bank robbers.

=== Chew #27 ===
Note: After Chew #18, the story then leaps to Chew #27 showing the reader events taking place a year later. It then returns to issue 19.

Tony is in the hospital after being injured in some way. Toni goes to visit him and after chatting with Caesar who came to wish him well, heads back to work. An old friend of Toni's shows up, he had gotten his hands on some Chogs (AKA Frickens) that had been bred with some psychoactive frogs he had. He tries to sell them, but D-Bear shows up and steals all of them. Toni and her supervisor, Paneer, go to D-Bear's restaurant to confiscate the Chogs. D-Bear tries to escape but Toni, who had a gun already in her hands, jumps and bites him in the shoulder. She then lets him leave, D-Bear is then hit by a truck and is taken to the hospital. Later, Tony has a mysterious visitor.

Chew #27 went on sale May 11, 2011. A second printing, subtitled "2nd Helping Edition", went on sale June 20, 2012 between the release of issue 26 and issue 28, and included a bonus short story titled "A View to a Pill" which had previously only been published in the Hero Comics 2011 anthology from IDW Publishing. "A View to a Pill" was not included in the trade paperback releases of the series.

== Characters ==
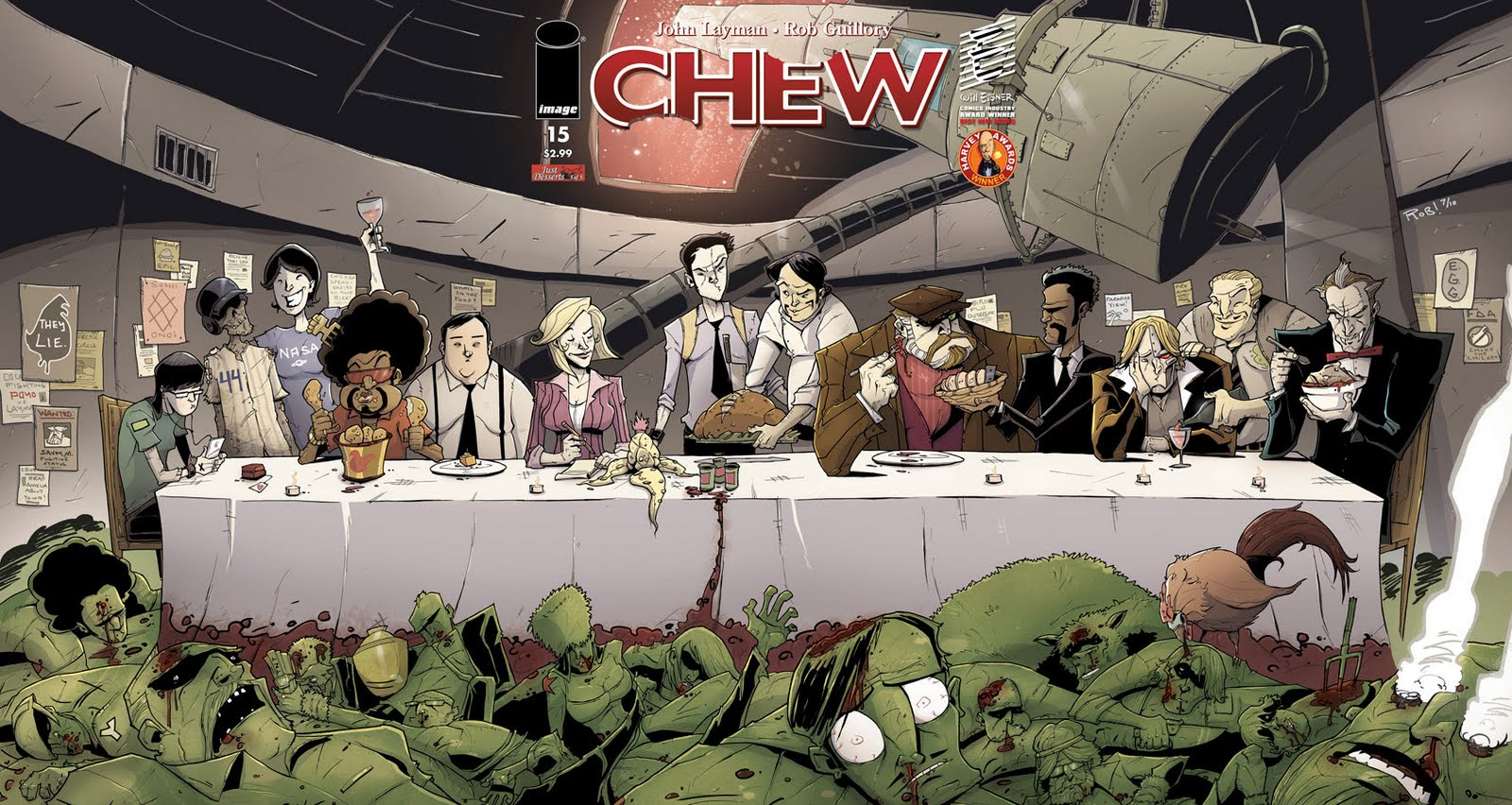
Cover of Chew #15, with all main characters pictured.

(By order of appearance)

=== Tony Chu ===
The protagonist. Tony is a cibopath. Oddly enough, beets are the only things he can eat that don't trigger his cibopathy. Tony originally worked for the Philadelphia PD, and then for the FDA. He's been called a "By-the-book square that never met a department regulation [he] couldn't love." He's a great detective, but he's not so great around women. Not much of Tony's backstory has been revealed yet, but he has a large family. Back when he was a beat cop, he proposed to his girlfriend, Min "Mindy" Tso, but she went insane and wanted Tony to eat one of her toes. It turns out that Tony still has the toe. Later we find out that Tony had a daughter with Min, whose name is Olive. During his time in the FDA, he falls for Amelia Mintz. When Tony is fired from the FDA, he is transferred to the Municipal Traffic Division. In Chew #27, Tony is in the hospital after being injured in some way, he keeps saying the names of other characters while in a seemingly comatose state.

=== John Colby ===
John was Tony's partner in the Philadelphia PD. When Tony gets a psychic sensation from his chicken soup and goes to arrest the chef, John is incapacitated by a butcher's knife to the face. After Mason runs, John joins the FDA, with cybernetic implants where his face was injured. John becomes Tony's new partner. John is often seen eating illegal chicken products whenever he can, and is apparently gay after sleeping with his boss to keep him from pestering Tony. John was turned into a cyborg after Mason Savoy suggested it. He was informed about this after Mason attempted to get John on his side and attacked. After alien writing appears in the sky John begins drinking heavily. Forcing Tony to team up with Mason's former partner Caesar. Later, Colby has sobered up enough to work with Tony again. He can control electronic devices with the computers in his head, even though he doesn't understand how. Colby is transferred out of the FDA to a position in the USDA. There he is partnered with a cyborg lion named Buttercup. It is revealed he has sex with the director of the USDA in order to get a new partner, a newly rebuilt Poyo.

=== Chow Chu ===
Chow is Tony's older brother. He is a former Chicken chef and used to host a TV show called In The Kitchen With Chow Chu. After chicken was banned he freaked out on air and his show was put on permanent hiatus. He began buying illegal chicken He found out about Montero's business and informed Tony. He was tracked down and sealed inside a vault. Chow moves to Yamapalu, where chicken is not illegal and he opens a restaurant there. However he finds out that Yamapalu does not serve chicken but Gallsaberries instead. Tony saves Chow from the island but has to break his jaw to get him to leave. For Thanksgiving Chow cooks his family an illegal turkey, and because of his broken jaw he cannot give grace so Tony has to do it. Chow eventually gets back on TV, and in an alternate future was shot in the head by a member of E.G.G.

=== D-Bear ===
Also known as Deshawn Berry, D-Bear sells Black Market Chicken. He informs to the FDA so they let him continue. He may have killed at least 5 people. He leads Tony and John into a black market chicken restaurant which results in John getting his face cut and Tony getting outed as a cibopath. John confronts D-Bear, beats him up and extorts him for a month. D-Bear partners with Tony to shut down an illegal cockfighting ring and free Poyo. D-Bear sells a huge shipment of black market chicken to Mother Clucker's. In Chew #27, D-Bear steals some Psychoactive Chogs from one of Toni's friends, he uses them in his restaurant to get customers high and then steal from them. Toni bites him in the shoulder, he's hit by a truck and is sent to the hospital.

=== Mason Savoy ===
Savoy was Tony's first partner at the FDA. He's a towering man who fights with a pair of sai. He is also a cibopath and has worked with the FDA for a very long time. He is very interested in what actually happened on the day of the bird-flu incident, and a flashback showed him holding a dying woman in his arms on that day. It is revealed that Savoy is the one who killed Evan Pepper, but his motive is never touched on. When Mason is found out by the FDA, he kills most of the agents and wounds John Colby. Apparently, Mason is the one who got Colby turned into a cyborg. Mason now has a vial of blood from the Voresophic Daniel Migdalo, which, if he drank it, would give him Migdalo's incredible intelligence—and his insanity. Savoy is currently a fugitive but is still continuing his investigation, with the aid of Agent Cesar and Olive Chu.

=== Mike Applebee ===
Applebee is Tony's boss at the FDA. He has it out for Tony from the start, and tries to make his job as difficult as can be. When he was informed of a hit that was put on Tony, he only decided to inform Tony after realizing that a dead Tony would mean more paperwork for himself. Applebee picked Colby to be Tony's new partner, mainly because Colby pretended to blame Tony for getting injured. To get Applebee to leave Tony alone, Colby has sex with him. Afterwards, Applebee tries to be more friendly towards Tony but this is clearly very hard for him. Later, Applebee decides to partner Tony up with D-Bear. When Tony decides to do surveillance on Montero, Applebee tries to make sure that Tony is the one doing surveillance all the time, but Colby decides to do it instead. When Colby confronts Mason, Applebee tells Tony that if Colby is hurt he'll demote him to meter maid. Applebee invites Colby over for Thanksgiving, but Colby never shows up. Soon after, Applebee begins sending Colby and Tony on progressively more dangerous and suicidal missions. John Layman, the author of Chew, has revealed that Applebee will survive until the end of the series.

=== Amelia Mintz ===
Amelia is a food critic at a newspaper. She is a saboscrivner. Tony knows her only from her articles—until he's assigned to get her fired. Why? Lately, she's gotten bored with her job and has begun writing exclusively about the most disgusting food she can find. These recent articles are so intensely unappetizing that they induce vomiting in anyone who reads or listens to them. Tony, however, seems to be immune to this nauseating effect, possibly due to his previous experience with disgusting food. When Tony goes to her office, she helps him defuse a situation with some terrorists from the group E.G.G.. She goes with the governor of Yamapalu. After finding out that he's imprisoning people, she is also captured. She is one of the people Tony saves from Yamapalu, and soon after they start dating. She starts writing about food for him, so he can experience taste without triggering psychic sensations.

=== The Vampire ===
The Vampire (Real name unknown, also known as Collector) is a cibopath from Serbia. Not much is known about him. He pretends to be a vampire to inspire fear, and drinks the blood of his victims to learn about them through cibopathy. He also eats the flesh of powerful people in order to "collect" their abilities. He sent agents to the Gardner-Kvashennaya International Telescope, he murdered the USDA agent Lin Sae Woo and her specially trained cyborg Rat Jellybean, invaded a compound on Yamapalu, and saved the Cibolocuter Fantanyeros only to kill him and feed on him. His minion sabotages a space station, escapes and brings The Vampire some computer files and a Gallsaberry. He speaks Russian and English. His Russian-speaking minions address him as Upyr, which is a Slavic folklore undead monster similar to a vampire.

=== Poyo ===
Poyo is a rooster from Yamapalu, who started out as a cockfighting champion. He was kept in a secret safe house by the gambling ring, until his location was discovered by Tony Chu and chief of police Raymond Kulolo. He later became a secret weapon of the FDA, considered to be a weapon of mass destruction, and then an agent of USDA. Poyo is the star of three spin-off one-shot comics - Chew: Secret Agent Poyo, Chew: Warrior Chicken Poyo and Chew: Demon Chicken Poyo.

=== Toni Chu ===
Toni (short for Antonelle) is Tony and Chow's sister. She works for NASA. Toni worked for a long time at the Farmington-Kapusta International Telescope in the Amazon. She was supposed to be transferred to the Gardner-Kvashennaya International Telescope but she stays in the States after alien writing shows up in the sky. She teams up with Tony at Area 51 and foils an E.G.G. plot to kill the President of the United States, the Queen of the United Kingdom, The Pope and her brother Chow. Toni also stops D-Bear from selling psychedelic frickens at his black market chicken restaurant. It is revealed that Toni has a food-related power in issue #19. Unlike Tony, Toni's power only works on living tissues, so she doesn't receive psychic readings from eating cooked food. It is later revealed that she had a drunken, sexual experience with Caesar, though she doesn't want him to remember it, possibly out of shame. Toni is eventually kidnapped by the Vampire. After telling him she's already helped being about his downfall at the hands of his brother, he kills her. But, having foreseen her death, Toni ate a diet of beets beforehand so that the Vampire could not gain her abilities by eating her flesh. Toni had foreseen the death of at least four major characters, including her own.

=== Olive Chu ===
Olive is Tony's daughter. After her mother's death she was raised by her aunt Rosemary, and has a strained relationship with her father. Like the other members of Chu family, Olive has special food-related abilities. As a cibopath, Olive is potentially more powerful than both Savoy and her father. When kidnapped by a desperate Savoy who required a cibopathic partner, Olive resists his attempts to subdue her, and only agreed to work with Savoy on her own terms.

== Locations ==
=== Gardner-Kvashennaya International Telescope ===
The Gardner-Kvashennaya International Telescope is one of the three most powerful telescopes in the world. The operating budget is 34 million dollars per year. It spent 2 years focused on the planet Altilis-738. Mason and Tony head there to find out about the mysterious death of Senator Hamantaschen. When they got there they found out that the telescope only needed 3 million to operate and they used the rest of the money on prostitutes, drugs and a llama. It turns out the prostitutes worked for The Vampire and the telescope station was mostly destroyed. The telescope was eventually repaired and made operational and Tony's twin sister Toni is going to be working there. Later, Toni tells Tony that she will not be transferred to the station.

=== Yamapalu ===
Yamapalu is one of the smallest populated islands in the Western Pacific Ocean. The governor of the island has been recruiting and kidnapping some of the top chefs and food critics in the world to cook a plant called a Gallsaberry which tastes like chicken when cooked that only grows on Yamapalu. The island is eventually attacked by Montero and most of the Gallsaberries are destroyed. The governor shoots himself after a meeting with The Vampire.

=== Altilis-738 ===
Altilis-738 is the third planet in a small solar system more than 24 light years away. It is populated by a species of purple people. 24 years ago strange writing appeared in the sky causing panic and then 24 years later, when the light reaches Earth, it is revealed the planet exploded. The same writing appeared above the Earth.

=== Mother Clucker's ===
Mother Clucker's is a Kentucky Fried Chicken imitator that opened 35 years ago. After the Chicken ban it was closed down. The owner of the restaurant is bitter towards the FDA and still hangs around the closed restaurant. After alien writing appears in the sky he decides to buy black market chicken and reopen his restaurant to the public.

=== Francis Bacon High School ===
Francis Bacon High School is a high school attended by Peter Pilaf and also Tony's daughter Olive. Their school's team name is the Shakin' Bacons. Several students there were killed in a food fight.

== Food-Related Powers ==
The Chew Universe is filled with a variety of characters who exhibit supernatural powers relating to food and their interpretation thereof.

=== Cibopath ===
A Cibopath can take a bite from anything and get a psychic sensation of what has happened to that object. The only thing it does not work on is beets. Tony Chu, Olive Chu, Mason Savoy, and The Vampire are Cibopaths. During the 'Major League Chew' arc, it is revealed that Tony, and possibly all Cibopaths, can absorb the skills of who he eats. The Vampire, Tony Chu, and Olive Chu are also capable of absorbing abilities although most prominently, The Vampire and Olive.

=== Saboscrivner ===
A Saboscrivner can write about food so accurately that people get the sensation of taste when they read about the food. Amelia Mintz is a Saboscrivner.

=== Cibolocutor ===
A Cibolocutor is able to communicate through food, and can also translate written works like plays, poems and operas into their food. Fantanyeros is a Cibolocutor.

=== Voresoph ===
A Voresoph becomes smarter the more he eats. Daniel Migdalo is a Voresoph.

=== Special Agent Vorhees's power ===
Seen through the series eating and mumbling, Special Agent Vorhees appears to have the ability to taste and identify every ingredient in whatever he's eating. At this point, this power has not been formally introduced. Also, he may be immune to the powers of the other characters, as The Barista's foam message had no effect on him (Though Caesar claims this is because Vorhees is illiterate).

=== Effervenductor ===
An Effervenductor has the capability of creating mind-controlling messages in foams. The Barista is an Effervenductor.

=== Peter Pilaf's power ===
This power allows the user to control people through food, but is not named in the story yet. Peter Pilaf has this power.

=== Xocoscalpere ===
A Xocoscalpere has the ability to sculpt chocolate—and only chocolate—"with such accuracy and verisimilitude" that it can mimic a real object exactly. Hershel Brown was a Xocoscalpere, having sculpted many chocolate weapons with all the deadly capabilities of the original. Olive Chu, having eaten part of Hershel Brown, has acquired the ability of xocoscalpery.

=== Cibovoyant ===
A Cibovoyant can see the future of any living thing that he or she eats. This power does not work on the dead or on inanimate objects. So far, Toni Chu is the only Cibovoyant at this point, and uses this power to see the future of potential lovers as well as her injured brother.

=== Tortaespadero ===
Able to cut tortillas into sharp objects.

=== Cipropanthropatic ===
Able to see the memories of anyone nearby eating the same thing. Sage Chu, Toni's sister, has this power.

=== Sabopictor ===
A Sabopictor is able to paint a picture that tastes deliciously what it looks like. Quindim Buongiovanni is one of three living Sabopictors, though he is last seen being attacked and likely killed by The Vampire.

=== Ciboinvalescor ===
Able to become stronger the more he eats. Dominic Partridge is a Ciboinvalescor.

=== Coquerafthartos ===
A Coquerafthartos is granted an extraordinarily long life after cooking a single special dish. Jeremiah Cumberland was a Coquerafthartos for close to 600 years before he was collected by The Vampire.

=== Lubodeipnosophistes ===
Able to seduce anyone they dine with.

=== Cibocelerent ===
Able to cook fast.

=== Mnemocoquus ===
Able to cook memories into their dishes.

=== Cibolinguist ===
Able to speak the language of whatever nationality of dish they were cooking.

=== Lagamousikian ===
Able to string guitars with pasta noodles.

=== Mixosecerner ===
Able to create drinks that compel you to tell secrets.

=== Bromaformutare ===
Able to take on the form of whatever he's last eaten.

=== Mnemcibarian ===
Able to create meals you could never forget.

=== Hortamagnatroph ===
A hortamagnatroph has skills in the garden which allow them to grow fruits and vegetables of enormous sizes.

=== Eroscibopictaros ===
A literal food pornographer. Able to take pictures of food that "inspire erotic feelings in the viewer". Ken Keebler is an eroscibopictaros.

=== Molluhomicuquus ===
Able to cook poisonous clam chowder. Marsala Kaczorowski is a molluhomicuquus.

=== Pederexplodier ===
Able to produce explosive flatulence. Brann Jerwar is a Pederexplodier.

=== Punicacuratio ===
Able to eat pomegranates and experience a preternatural restorative effect alongside some other assorted anomalous benefits.

=== Viresarantheacist ===
Able to get stronger by eating spinach. The featured Viresarantheacist is unnamed but is referred to as a "sailor man," a reference to Popeye.

=== Victuspeciosian ===
Within the fictional setting, Judy Heinz-Campbell is characterized as a "victuspeciosian," possessing the ability to formulate topical face masks using food ingredients that produce temporary cosmetic effects.

== Collected editions ==
=== Trade paperbacks ===
The series has been collected into trade paperbacks:

#	Title	Release date	Page count	Collected issues	Cover price	TPB ISBN
1	Chew, Volume 1: Taster's Choice	November 2009	128	Chew #1–5	$9.99	ISBN 1-60706-159-7
2	Chew, Volume 2: International Flavor	April 2010	128	Chew #6–10	$12.99	ISBN 1-60706-260-7
3	Chew, Volume 3: Just Desserts	November 2010	128	Chew #11–15	$12.99	ISBN 1-60706-335-2
4	Chew, Volume 4: Flambé	September 2011	120	Chew #16–20	$12.99	ISBN 1-60706-398-0
5	Chew, Volume 5: Major League Chew	April 2012	120	Chew #21–25	$12.99	ISBN 1-60706-523-1
6	Chew, Volume 6: Space Cakes	January 2013	156	Chew #26–30, Chew: Secret Agent Poyo one-shot	$14.99	ISBN 1-60706-621-1
7	Chew, Volume 7: Bad Apples	August 2013	128	Chew #31–35	$12.99	ISBN 1-60706-767-6
8	Chew, Volume 8: Family Recipes	April 2014	128	Chew #36–40	$12.99	ISBN 1-60706-938-5
9	Chew, Volume 9: Chicken Tenders	February 2015	160	Chew #41–45, Chew: Warrior Chicken Poyo one-shot	$14.99	ISBN 1-63215-289-4
10	Chew, Volume 10: Blood Puddin`	August 2015	128	Chew #46–50	$14.99	ISBN 1-63215-396-3
11	Chew, Volume 11: The Last Suppers	May 2016	128	Chew #51–55, Chew / Revival (Chew creators' half)	$14.99	ISBN 1-63215-681-4
12	Chew, Volume 12: Sour Grapes	January 18, 2017	184	Chew #56–60, Chew: Demon Chicken Poyo one-shot	$16.99	ISBN 978-1-5343-0031-6
N/A	Outer Darkness/Chew	September 15, 2020	72	Outer Darkness/Chew #1-3	$12.99	ISBN 978-1-5343-1657-7
1(Chu)	Chu, Volume 1: The First Course	January 26, 2021	128	Chu #1-5	$9.99	ISBN 978-1-5343-1774-1
2(Chu)	Chu, Volume 2: (She) Drunk History	January 25, 2022	128	Chu #6-10	$16.99	ISBN 978-1-5343-2003-1

=== Hardcovers ===
There are also large hardcover editions which each collect two consecutive trade paperbacks:

- Chew Omnivore Edition, Volume 1 (collects Chew #1–10, 264 pages, August 2010, ISBN 1-60706-293-3)
- Chew Omnivore Edition, Volume 2 (collects Chew #11–20, 264 pages, December 2011, ISBN 1-60706-426-X)
- Chew Omnivore Edition, Volume 3 (collects Chew #21–30 and the Chew: Secret Agent Poyo one-shot, 288 pages, March 2013, ISBN 1-60706-670-X)
- Chew Omnivore Edition, Volume 4 (collects Chew #31–40, 272 pages, July 2014, ISBN 978-1-63215-031-8)
- Chew Omnivore Edition, Volume 5 (collects Chew #41–50 and Chew: Warrior Chicken Poyo one-shot, 304 pages, December 2015, ISBN 978-1-63215-623-5)
- Chew Omnivore Edition, Volume 6 (collects Chew #51–60, Demon Chicken Poyo one-shot and Chew/Revival one-shots, 344 pages, April 2017, ISBN 978-1-5343-0180-1)

As well as the omnivore editions, there are even larger hardcover editions called the Smörgåsbord editions, named after the large Swedish buffets, collecting 20 issues each:

- CHEW Smorgasbord Edition Volume 1 (collects Chew #1–20, 576 pages, November 2013, ISBN 1-60706-805-2)
- CHEW Smorgasbord Edition Volume 2 (collects Chew #21–40 and the Chew: Secret Agent Poyo one-shot, 576 pages, July 2015, ISBN 1-63215-428-5)
- CHEW Smorgasbord Edition Volume 3 (collects Chew #41–60 and the Chew: Warrior Chicken Poyo one-shot, Chew: Demon Chicken Poyo one-shot, and the dual crossover event, Chew/Revival, 640 pages, July 2017, ISBN 1-5343-0212-3)

=== Other releases ===
Tony Chu additionally appears in I Hate Fairyland – I Hate Image, a special I Hate Fairyland issue which crosses over I Hate Fairyland with many other Image Comics properties. This issue has been published as a Free Comic Book Day release, as a "Special Edition," and as a component of the I Hate Fairyland: Book Two hardcover release.

The charity anthology Comics for Ukraine: Sunflower Seeds includes an original Chew short story.

== Reception ==
The first three issues of Chew have all sold out multiple printings with the first issue receiving four printings as well as being reprinted in black and white in The Walking Dead #63. The first issue was so popular that it was called one of Image's most acclaimed titles, and was reprinted again in the first wave of the Image First line. IGN gave the first issue a 9.5 out of 10

Chew Vol. 1: Taster's Choice and Chew Vol. 2: International Flavor have both been on the New York Times Bestsellers List.

Chew ended up on several Best of 2009 lists, including IGN's Best Indie Series of 2009, and MTV Splashpage's Best New Series of 2009. Chew was also #4 on ComicBookResources.com's Best 100 Comics of 2009 list.

On July 23, 2010, Chew won the Eisner Award for Best New Series. On July 27, 2011 Chew won the Eisner Award for Best Continuing Series.

Chew also won two 2010 Harvey Awards (Best New Series and Best New Talent) and was nominated for, but did not win, two 2010 Eagle Awards (Favourite New Comicbook and Favourite American Colour Comicbook).

== In other media ==
=== Unfinished animated adaptation ===
In July 2010 it was announced that production company Circle of Confusion, the same company that produces the Walking Dead television series, was planning to adapt Chew. In March 2011 Showtime announced it was developing Chew into a half-hour comedy series, based on a script by Terri Hughes Burton and Ron Milbauer.

Chew was mentioned in Hart of Dixie.

In April 2014, it was announced Chew would now be getting an animated adaptation. This project would be produced by Jeff Krelitz and David Boxenbaum via their multimedia company Heavy Metal. Jeff Krelitz would also be directing and John Layman would write. The executive producers would be John Layman, Rob Guillory and Scott Boxenbaum. Steven Yeun would voice the main character Tony Chu, Felicia Day would voice his love interest Amelia Mintz, and Robin Williams would voice Mason Savoy; following Williams' death in the middle of production, after Yeun and Day had recorded their parts, work on the project "stalled" until he was recast with David Tennant in June 2015; despite this, on April 21, 2017, it was revealed in an interview with Rob Guillory that while all voice recording for the animated adaptation had been completed and animation partially begun, the project had been quietly shelved, Guillory saying that "it just didn't happen because Hollywood can be weird sometimes…".

=== Tabletop game ===
On May 19, 2014, IDW Games announced a tabletop game. The game will feature multiple ways to play including board, card and dice games. IDW Games will be working with John Layman and Rob Guillory to create the game which was initially due to be released early 2015. After multiple delays, it was eventually released on July 15, 2015.

=== Tabletop role playing game ===
On October 5, 2021, publisher Imagining Games launched a Kickstarter for a Chew tabletop role-playing game. The campaign realised nearly $53,000 from a goal of a little under $7,000. On the day of the campaign launch, Hyper RPG aired an actual play demo on their Twitch channel featuring Kaiji Tang as the GM, Jimmy Wong as Tony Chu, Elyse Willems as Amelia Mintz, Malika Lim Eubank as Toni Chu, and Zac Eubank as John Colby. CHEW The Roleplaying Game is a "Forged in the Dark" game with rules adapted from Blades in the Dark. It was designed and written by Pete Petrusha, Justin Forest, Justin Ford, Steve Dee and Joseph Weaver. It was released in 2024 and won a Judge's Spotlight Award at the 2024 ENNIE Awards.

== See also ==
- Cannibalism
