= Copy (publishing) =

Written material

In publishing, advertising and related fields, copy is written material, in contrast to photographs or other elements of layout, in books, magazines, newspapers and advertising.

In advertising, the term "copy" means the output of copywriters, who are employed to write material which encourages consumers to buy goods or services.

In newspapers and magazines, body copy (q.v.) is the main article or text that writers are responsible for, in contrast with display copy, accompanying material such as headlines and captions, which are usually written by copy editors or sub-editors.

In books, it means the text (manuscript, typescript) as written by the author, which the copy editor then prepares for typesetting and printing. This is also referred to as editorial copy, which is said to have two subdivisions, the body copy and the adjuncts to the body copy. The term's usage can be demonstrated in the way an editor decides to embed an advertising material directly into the editorial copy, which means that the advertisement would use the same font, layout presentation, feel of the editorial copy it is being integrated into (or not, as the case may be). This concept underscores how the copy can also refer to the identity of the newspaper or the magazine since the method of composition and layout can define its brand and positioning.

== See also ==
- Camera-ready copy – Document technically ready to print
- Content (media) – Methods used to exchange information
- Copywriting – Writing text for the purpose of advertising or marketing
- Copy editing – Improving the formatting, style, and accuracy of text
- Hard copy – Paper or other physical form of information
- Publishing – Production and distribution of media
