= Captain Dynamo (character) =

- Cover to Dynamo 5 #1, showing the late Captain Dynamo in the upper right, and his five children, the Dynamo 5, in the foreground. Art by Mahmud A. Asrar.

Publication information
- Publisher: Image Comics
- First appearance: Noble Causes: Extended Family #2 (June 2004)
- Created by: Jay Faerber; Fran Bueno

In-story information
- Alter ego: William Warner
- Species: Superhuman
- Team affiliations: Dynamo 5
- Abilities: Superhuman strength Flight; Laser/X-Ray/Telescopic vision Telepathy; Shapeshifting

Captain Dynamo (William Warner) is a comic book superhero, created by writer Jay Faerber and artist Fran Bueno, who first appeared as a supporting character in Noble Causes: Extended Family #2 (June 2004) by Image Comics.

Captain Dynamo was killed by the assassin Widowmaker in Noble Causes #18 (March 2006), and now serves as a posthumous background concept in the monthly series Dynamo 5. Patterned in the vein of the Superman archetype, Captain Dynamo was the powerful primary protector of Tower City, and considered by his peers and benefactors to be “the greatest super-hero in the world.” His death threatened to leave Tower City vulnerable to his legion of supervillain enemies, so his widow, Madeline “Maddie” Warner, tracked down and assembled five illegitimate children fathered by Dynamo to carry on his legacy as the Dynamo 5, as seen in Dynamo 5 #1 (January 2007).

== Fictional character biography ==
William Warner was born in 1954. Little is known about his origin as a superhero, aside from the fact that he was the much-beloved protector of Tower City for forty years following his exposure to an unidentified form of radiation that granted him superhuman abilities, and husband of Maddie Warner, a former agent of a government superhero monitoring organization known as F.L.A.G., who used the cover of an award-winning investigative journalist, now retired. Dynamo had five superhuman abilities: flight, super strength, telepathy, shapeshifting, and laser/x-ray/telescopic vision, and maintained a secret headquarters beneath an industrial pier.

Dynamo was killed in 2006 by the assassin Widowmaker, who was presumably hired by one of his enemies. Dynamo was eventually found dead, naked in a hotel bed, the cause of death attributed to some type of poison on his lips, though the details of his death were not released to the public. Warner suspected that he did not find himself in that position of his own accord, but was placed in it by his murderer in order to embarrass him. His death caused an outpouring of grief in the Image universe superhero community, all or most of which was in attendance at his funeral, including the Savage Dragon, Shadowhawk, and Invincible. In sorting through his personal effects, Warner discovered his little black book, which was filled with detailed information on countless incidents of infidelity on his part. Although devastated by the extent of her late husband's indiscretions, Warner was faced with the problem of Dynamo's numerous enemies, who would now take advantage of Tower City in his absence. Although other superheroes attempted to pitch in to keep the peace, Warner decided that Tower City needed a permanent protector.

Scouring through the information she gleaned from her husband's belongings, she located five young people she believed could be his illegitimate children: Vancouver, British Columbia high school geek Hector Chang, Washington, D.C. law student and activist Olivia “Livvie” Lewis, aimless womanizer Spencer Bridges, Hollywood, California theater employee and NYU Film School graduate Bridget Flynn, and Eastbridge, Texas high school football star Gage Reinhart. Gathering them together, Warner exposed the five to the same radiation that Dynamo had been exposed to forty years earlier, unlocking their own latent superhuman abilities, with each one manifesting one of the five powers that their father possessed. Donning costumes to conceal their identities, the five of them carry on his legacy as the superhero team the Dynamo 5, while coming to terms with learning about the father they never knew, and the four new half-siblings they each now have. Although the five are unaware that Warner is a former agent of F.L.A.G., she is determined to mold them not only into a team, but into a family as well, and functions as their mentor and “unofficial sixth member”, calling the shots from the same headquarters once used by Captain Dynamo, and keeping in constant remote contact with them during their missions.

== Personality ==
While Captain Dynamo boasted a public image as the greatest superhero in the world, in private, he was a habitual womanizer who cheated on his wife, Maddie Warner, and fathered numerous children, even when it compromised his crime-fighting duties. In his first appearance in Noble Causes: Extended Family #2, he attends the wedding anniversary of Race Noble, the son of Dynamo's friend of twenty years, Doc Noble, and Race's wife, Elizabeth "Liz" Donnelly-Noble. After Dynamo hits on Liz, and ignores her polite lack of interest, she loudly rebuffs him publicly, causing him to become violent. After he is subdued by other superheroes present, his violent behavior is discovered to be the result of the influence of an extraterrestrial parasite that emerges from Dynamo's mouth. After the parasite is neutralized, Liz tells Dynamo that she knows that he was not under the creature's influence when he hit on her, and that while he may continue his public façade, she would not forget his behavior.

Dynamo's philandering even extended to his treatment of super criminals, including his archenemy, Chrysalis. In Dynamo 5 Annual #1 (April 2008), Dynamo discovers that Tog-Mar the Living Landscape, an immense monster, was made to attack a city as a diversion while Chrysalis attempts to rob a nearby bank. While Dynamo foils her heist, he allows her to escape, and confirms their meeting later that night, right before Warner and her partner, Augie Ford, arrive at the bank. Warner eventually discovers the truth about her husband's affairs after his death, including a number of illegitimate children he fathered. In Dynamo 5 #6, Chrysalis reveals that Dynamo never "caught" her because of their affair, although they often had arguments over her career as a criminal. She also reveals that Dynamo fathered her daughter, Cynthia, who inherited all of Dynamo's powers, and goes by the code name Synergy. According to Chyrsalis, Dynamo was a presence in Synergy's life, and led a second life behind Warner's back as he helped to raise her.

Dynamo also fathered a child with an alien woman that he had met in outer space, after coming to the aid of her malfunctioning starship. Because of the taboo of raising a half-breed on her world, she came to Earth to give custody of their son to Dynamo. Because he viewed the child as a threat to his marriage, he left the infant at a F.L.A.G. research facility, where the child grew up without parents. When he began to bond with Dr. Bridges, one of the scientists there, the two were separated, and Dynamo refused Bridges' pleas to free the boy from the facility. Although Bridges smuggled the boy, who adopted the name Spencer Bridges, out of the facility, she knew she could not raise him in secret, and he instead grew up in an orphanage and a series of foster homes. Because of this, Spencer views Dynamo as "an enormous hypocrite and a horrible husband".

== Powers ==
Captain Dynamo seen using each of his five superhuman powers. From Dynamo 5 #1; Page 1. Art by Mahmud A. Asrar.

Captain Dynamo had five known superhuman abilities, the result of exposure forty years earlier to an unidentified form of radiation. The full extent of these abilities is unknown, however a clue to this may lie in his five children, who each inherited one of his powers genetically from him. Whether their manifestation of his powers exactly mirrors his own or exceeds them, however, is unclear.

- Flight: Captain Dynamo had the ability to defy gravity and fly through the air. Although he had superhuman strength, his flight ability may have included the ability to generate extra thrust completely apart from this, since his daughter, Slingshot, who inherited his flight ability, is able to carry another person while in flight, despite not having inherited her father's superhuman strength.
- Superhuman strength: Captain Dynamo had superhuman strength. The upper limit of this strength is unknown, but the heaviest object he has been observed lifting over his head is a bus. His daughter, Bridget Flynn (who goes by the superhero codename Scrap), inherited this power, and appears to be capable of similar strength, as she easily lifted a tank over her head and threw it the length of a city block. This strength also comes with a degree of invulnerability, as Bridget is bulletproof and has resisted various attacks including intense heat, electricity and being frozen in a block of ice. Bridget can also hold her breath for twenty minutes.
- Vision: Captain Dynamo had several vision-related powers, including laser, x-ray, and telescopic vision. With his laser vision, he could project powerful red laser beams from his eyes. With his x-ray vision, he could see through solid objects, and with his telescopic vision, he could see great distances. The upper limit of his various vision powers is unknown, but his son, Hector Chang (who goes by the superhero codename Visionary), who inherited this power, is able to use it as an effective weapon in combat to neutralize both human opponents and armored tanks.
- Shapeshifting: Captain Dynamo had the ability to physically alter the shape and form of his body. With this ability, he could alter his face features, his body type, and even the clothes he wore, and appear like anyone he chooses. How extensive or radically he could alter his form is unknown, but he could even alter the apparent size of his body, enabling him to disguise himself, for example, as an obese person. His son, Spencer Bridges (who goes by the superhero codename Myriad), inherited this power, and when in battle, alters his face to remove all of its facial features in order to hide his identity, though how he can breathe or speak when lacking a nose and mouth is unknown. Bridges also seems to require coming into physical contact with someone in order to copy a specific person (or at least their clothing), as seen in Dynamo 5 #1.
- Telepathy: Captain Dynamo was a telepath who could psychically communicate with other people. The precise use of this power on his part are unknown, but it is known that his son, Gage Reinhart (who goes by the superhero codename Scatterbrain), initially could only use it to read other people's minds. He could not use it as an offensive weapon like the X-Men’s Professor X, whose telepathy allows him to cause intense pain, render unconsciousness, and even control the actions of an opponent, but he gained this ability when electrocuted by the villain Voltage in Dynamo 5 #5. Whether Captain Dynamo had this ability is unknown. He also cannot read someone's mind if they are unconscious. However, with concentration, he can sift through the thoughts of the many people around him to remotely track someone's thoughts by recognizing their brainwave patterns.
