= Wraith (Image Comics) =

- Wraith, from Dynamo 5 #25 (October 2009). Art by Tim Seeley.

Publication information
- Publisher: Image Comics
- First appearance: Dynamo 5 #1 (March 2007)
- Created by: Jay Faerber; Mahmud A. Asrar

In-story information
- Alter ego: Spencer Bridges
- Species: Half superhuman/Half extraterrestrial
- Team affiliations: Dynamo 5
- Notable aliases: Myriad, Vigil
- Abilities: Expert acrobat and martial artist Superhuman strength, speed and endurance Telepathy; Formerly: Shapeshifting

Spencer Bridges is a comic book superhero, and member of the superhero team Dynamo 5, which appears in the series of the same name from Image Comics. Created by writer Jay Faerber and artist Mahmud A. Asrar, he first appeared in Dynamo 5 #1 (January 2007). He is a half human, half extraterrestrial hybrid, the child of an alien woman and the Earth superhero, Captain Dynamo, from whom he inherited superhuman abilities.

For the first 24 issues of the series, the character possesses shapeshifting abilities and uses the codename Myriad, though for a brief time he masquerades as a female masked vigilante called Vigil, who exhibits superhuman strength, speed, and endurance, and expertise in martial arts and acrobatics. It is later revealed that for some time, he had been taking an illegal drug called Flex, that granted him his elevated strength, speed, and endurance, powers that remained permanently bonded to his half-alien physiology after he ceased taking the drug. In issue #25 of the series (October 2009), the character, whose shapeshifting powers had been erased in the previous issue, obtained different powers, in addition to his superhuman strength, speed, and endurance. Now possessing telepathy, he adopted the codename Wraith.

With regard to his reasons for making the identity Vigil a female, Bridges has indicated that he is not gay, though not entirely heterosexual either, and that he chose to make the Vigil identity female as an experiment, as his former shapeshifting abilities presented "opportunities".

== Publication history ==
Captain Dynamo, a superhero who first appeared in Noble Causes: Extended Family #2 (June 2004) was depicted as a womanizing philanderer, and in Dynamo 5 #1 (January 2007), following Captain Dynamo's assassination, his widow, Maddie Warner, a former government agent posing as now-retired investigative reporter, discovers from his personal effects that he had been unfaithful to her countless times. Despite her devastation at this discovery, Warner realizes that without a full-time protector, Tower City will be vulnerable to Captain Dynamo’s legion of supervillain enemies. She uses her skills to track down five people who could be Dynamo’s illegitimate children.

Spencer Bridges is the third person Warner contacts to be on the team. He agrees to join the team only because Maddie is paying him. Gathering all five of the children together, Warner exposes them to the same unidentified radiation that gave Captain Dynamo his powers forty years earlier, unlocking their powers. Spencer, who manifests his father's shapeshifting ability, takes on the codename Myriad, and works to protect Tower City with his newly discovered brothers and sisters.

Spencer Bridges as Myriad. From Dynamo 5 #1. Art by Mahmud A. Asrar.

After fighting crime alongside his siblings for less than a year, Spencer, in losing consciousness after swimming from the team's flooded underwater headquarters to the surface, is rendered unconscious, and is revealed to have a bizarre, alien-like appearance. Confronted by his siblings, he reveals that one of the women with whom Captain Dynamo had an affair was an alien whom Dynamo met in deep space when he came to the aid of her crippled starship. After aiding in its repairs, he journeyed with her crew to her home planet, where he and the woman had an affair that resulted in her pregnancy. Because of the cultural taboo of raising a "half-breed" on her world, she journeyed to Earth after Spencer was born to leave him in Dynamo's custody. Dynamo, however, had no interest in raising Spencer or threatening his marriage, so he left Spencer in the custody of a F.L.A.G. (Foundation for Law and Government) research facility, telling them not that Spencer was his son, but that he found the infant at an alien crash site. Spencer's home for the next few years was the research compound, where scientists subjected him to extensive study and experimentation, including exposing him to the same radiation that gave Captain Dynamo his superhuman abilities, not knowing what effect it would have on the child. This exposure activated Spencer's shapeshifting ability, long before he met Maddie Warner. He learned how to use this power to disguise his alien appearance, and to mimic the appearance of people around him, but one of the scientists in particular, an African-American woman named Dr. Bridges, took a liking to Spencer, and the two formed a rapport. The other scientists were not amenable to their bond, and separated the two. Unable to convince Captain Dynamo to remove Spencer from the facility, Bridges had Spencer use his shapeshifting ability to smuggle him out of the compound. Knowing that she would be discovered by F.L.A.G. if she attempted to raise Spencer on her own, she placed Spencer, who maintained the appearance of a full human, in the care of child services, and never saw him again. Spencer spent his childhood in an orphanage, and was placed in a succession of less-than-ideal foster homes, and struck out on his own at the age of thirteen. Spencer speculated that Warner found him through a notation in Dynamo's black books about Dr. Bridges. At some point Spencer took on Dr. Bridges' last name, though when he did so is unknown. The origin of his first name, and the point in his life at which he adopted it has also not been specified.

His siblings feel betrayed by his having kept his true nature a secret. Spencer sees this as hypocrisy, as all of his siblings have lied to their families about who their real father was, about their lives as superheroes, and allowed a murderer named Lionel Barstow to go free in order to free Neil Lewis, the father of Spencer's sister, Slingshot, who was being held hostage by Barstow's former employers. This argument does not convince Spencer's siblings, and as a result of both this revelation, Warner's condition, the flooding of the Aquarium, and the need to return to their civilian lives, the team seems to fall apart.

Bridges as the female vigilante, Vigil, as seen on the cover of Dynamo 5 #14 (June 2008). Art by Mahmud A. Asrar.

Despite this, Myriad decides to continue fighting crime in Tower City himself. He moves to a Tower City hotel, and uses his shapeshifting abilities to pose as a female masked vigilante named Vigil, relying on his natural speed, martial arts and acrobatic abilities to fight crime. When he encounters Scrap, the only other team member who decided to continue protecting Tower City, Scrap, not knowing that Vigil is her brother, decides to team up with Vigil, who poses as a native of Tower City. The two later recruit three other superheroes, Quake, and the mother-daughter team the Firebirds, into a new Dynamo 5 team. The new team suffers badly against Widowmaker, who assembles a team of supervillain mercenaries to attack them, and during this battle, Vigil is revealed to be Myriad. The team is joined by Slingshot, Scatterbrain, and Visionary, who manage to defeat their enemies. Although Quake and the elder Firebird are seriously injured, the Dynamo 5 siblings are reunited as a team.

In issues 22 and 23, it was revealed that in order compensate for the lack of offensive superhuman powers that lent themselves to combat situations that his siblings had, Spencer had been taking Flex, a street drug derived from the serum that turns humans into Whiptail, a monstrous, bipedal lizard. After he was discovered, he led his siblings and F.L.A.G. agent Augie Ford to his dealers, but agreed to stop taking the drug. He subsequently discovered, however, that his elevated strength, speed and endurance remained, which Doc Noble speculated occurred because it bonded to his extraterrestrial DNA.

In issues 24 and 25 of the series, the team was attacked by their other half-sibling, the supervillain Synergy, who used a weapon to erase the team's abilities and capture them. The team freed themselves, and used the weapon to restore their powers, but they manifested different abilities than the ones they previously had. Spencer found that he and his brother Gage, had switched their powers. Now possessing telepathy, Spencer took the new codename Wraith.

In Dynamo 5: Sins of the Father #3 (August 2010), Spencer learns, while battling another extraterrestrial who recognizes his race, that his people are called the Khandrians. During this encounter, the telepathic Spencer sees in his opponent's mind an image of a humanoid being held captive by Khandrians who were apparently experimenting on him. It is also during this battle that Dr. Bridges sees Spencer on television.

== Personality ==
Spencer Bridges is depicted as a promiscuous womanizer in his late teens who has never held a job for more than two weeks, though he never seems to be without financial means. Dynamo 5 creator Jay Faerber indicated upon the series' debut that his shapeshifting ability would tie into his lack of direction in life, saying, "He inherited Cap's shape-shifting powers, and he can now become anyone he chooses. Maybe one day he'll figure out who he wants to be." Shortly after meeting his siblings, Spencer tells them that the people who took him and other children in did so only to receive a government check, and while he can remember all their faces, he cannot remember half their names, and feels that today he doesn't need a family. Unlike his brother Hector, who thinks of Captain Dynamo as "Dad", and has a poster of Dynamo over his bed, Spencer, having wondered all his life who his father was, is disappointed to learn it was Captain Dynamo, and thinks of the late superhero as "an enormous hypocrite and a horrible husband". Despite Spencer's dismissal about the need for family, he undergoes an eye-opening experience when Maddie Warner asks him to impersonate his brother Gage after Gage falls into a coma, in order to quell suspicion on the part of Gage's family, who are unaware of Gage's superhero life. The experience serves to illustrate to Spencer what having a stable family is like, something had never experienced. However, in getting carried away in this role, he initiates a romantic overture with a schoolmate of Gage's, and when Gage, who discovers he is capable of astral projection, witnesses the two in a romantic embrace, he sees this as an invasion of privacy, later coming to blows with Spencer. Spencer wonders if it is motivated by racism, as the girl in question was black. Spencer apologizes to Gage, but when he confessed how having a family for a small number of days made him feel, Gage, understanding of this, forgives him. Although he initially accepts Warner's offer to join the team because she pays him, he eventually decides to move to Tower City full-time and help protect it for more altruistic reasons.

After losing his shapeshifting abilities, Spencer is isolated by the fact that his extraterrestrial appearance limits his ability to socialize outside the team's headquarters.

== Powers and abilities ==
Spencer Bridges is a half human, half extraterrestrial hybrid, the product of a human father and a Khandrian mother. Although he formerly used his shapeshifting ability to appear human, his true appearance is that of a Khandrian, the extraterrestrial race to which his mother belonged. As such, he has been depicted with gray skin, no hair, and a long face that includes a pronounced brow and a small, snout-like nose just under his eyes. The space between his nose and mouth is proportionately greater than that found in a human face. Artist Mahmud A. Asrar depicted him without a philtrum, though other artists such as Tim Seeley and Julio Brilha did not. He also has no apparent ears, at least none that resemble those of a human. His hands have a total of three digits, including an opposable thumb, though his other two non-pollical digits are much larger than those of a human's. All three of his digits have pointed claws.

From the premiere of the Dynamo 5 series, Spencer exhibits shapeshifting powers with which he can alter the form of his body, his facial features, and even the clothes he wears, in order to disguise himself as anyone he chose. He sometimes practices his impersonations of certain people, and uses reference materials in order to perfect his disguises. Like his father, Spencer can alter the apparent size of his body, enabling him to disguise himself, for example, as an obese person, or a person with more developed musculature, as when he impersonates Captain Dynamo. How he is able to do this, in light of the law of conservation of mass, has not been explained. When engaged in superheroics, Myriad does not wear a mask or helmet like his siblings, but instead disguises himself by erasing all of his facial features. How he is able to see, breathe, hear, and speak without them was also not explained. Spencer's ability to maintain a disguise was dependent upon his concentration; being punched in the face while disguised, for example, would cause that disguise to falter, and being rendered unconscious would cause him to revert to his true, Khandrian appearance. His shapeshifting ability is erased in issue #24 of the series.

In issue #25 of the series, Spencer acquires the power of telepathy, a power that was formerly possessed by his brother, Gage Reinhart. His power is both voluntary and passive. While he can use his power to deliberately read someone's mind, he can also involuntarily pick up the thoughts of those around him, even when he does not wish it. Although he was not depicted utilizing all the applications of his telepathy that his brother Gage exhibited, it is otherwise observed that his powers function exactly as Gage's did.

As a result of taking a street drug called Flex, Spencer develops other powers unrelated to his father's, and which his siblings do not have: superhuman strength, speed and endurance. Though he ceases using the drug, he retains these powers permanently, it is speculated, because the substance remains permanently bonded to his half-alien physiology. The extent of these powers have not been explicitly given, but they enable him to break several lines of chain tied around him as a restraint, and leap dozens of feet into the air, and across rooftops. Combined with his knowledge of martial arts and acrobatics, Spencer is seen successfully battling opponents such as Anchor, Chain Reaction, and Blue Blaster single-handedly, and holds his own against Widowmaker, Optima, and a human wearing the strength-amplifying Strong-Suit.

== See also ==
- Dynamo 5
- Smasher
- Ramjet
- Menagerie
- Supervision
- Captain Dynamo
- Maddie Warner
