= Supervision (character) =

- Supervision, from Dynamo 5 #25 (October 2009). Art by Andie Tong.

Publication information
- Publisher: Image Comics
- First appearance: Dynamo 5 #1 (January 2007)
- Created by: Jay Faerber; Mahmud A. Asrar

In-story information
- Alter ego: Bridget Flynn
- Species: Superhuman
- Team affiliations: Dynamo 5
- Notable aliases: Scrap
- Abilities: Laser/x-ray/telescopic vision Formerly: Superhuman strength Invulnerability

Bridget Flynn is a comic book superheroine, a member of the superhero team Dynamo 5, which appears in the monthly series of the same name from Image Comics. Created by writer Jay Faerber and artist Mahmud A. Asrar, the character first appeared in Dynamo 5 #1 (January 2007).

For the first 24 issues of the series, the character possessed superhuman strength and invulnerability, and went by the codename Scrap. In issue #25 of the series (October 2009), the character, whose powers had been erased in the previous issue, obtained different powers. Now possessing laser, telescopic and x-ray vision, she goes by the codename Supervision.

== Publication history ==
Captain Dynamo, a superhero who first appeared in Noble Causes: Extended Family #2 (June 2004) was depicted as a womanizing philanderer, and in Dynamo 5 #1 (January 2007), it was revealed, after he was assassinated, that he had fathered a number of illegitimate children. His widow, former agent of the government superhuman-monitoring agency, F.L.A.G., posing as a now-retired investigative reporter Maddie Warner, gathered five of these children in order to form a team to protect Tower City in Captain Dynamo's absence. One of these was Cleveland native, NYU Film School graduate and aspiring screenwriter Bridget Flynn, the oldest of the five. Warner exposed Bridget and her four half-siblings to the same energy that gave Captain Dynamo his powers 40 years earlier, unlocking their latent powers. Bridget developed her father's superhuman strength and invulnerability, and took the codename Scrap as a member of Dynamo 5.

During the series' first year of publication in 2007, Bridget and the other members of Dynamo 5 were shown confronting various threats to Tower City, while dealing with the personal conflicts that arose as a result of discovering four new half-siblings, as well as the effect that their new lives had on their personal lives at home. Bridget in particular dealt with the knowledge that the man who raised her along with her mother was not her biological father.

Bridget Flynn in her previous identity of Scrap. From Dynamo 5 #1. Art by Mahmud A. Asrar.

In a 2008 storyline, when Warner was rendered into a coma, the team's underwater headquarters, the Aquarium, was flooded, and it was discovered that Bridget's teammate and half-brother, Spencer, was a half-extraterrestrial with an alien physiognomy who had manifested his shapeshifting ability years earlier, and not when the members of the team first met. These developments, along with the problems that their superhero lives inflicted on their personal lives, led to the dissolution of the team. However, Bridget decided to stay in Tower City to protect it, and recruited allies of the team to act as replacements. but her siblings eventually reunite with her as teammates. She subsequently decided to move from Los Angeles to Tower City full-time. Although Bridget and her other siblings came to regard sister Livvie as the team's de facto leader, the leadership that Bridget displayed during this period gave cause for Warner, after she emerged from her coma, to suggest that Bridget be the team's leader.

Bridget also guest-starred with Dynamo 5 in two issues of Gemini, another creator-owned Image Comics series by Jay Faerber, in 2008 and 2009.

In a 2009 storyline in issues 24 and 25 of the series, the team was attacked by their other half-sibling, the supervillain Synergy, who used a weapon to erase the team's abilities and capture them. The team freed themselves, and used the weapon to restore their powers, but they developed different abilities than the ones they had before. Bridget found that she and her brother Hector, who had vision-related powers, had switched their abilities. Bridget now had x-ray, telescopic, and laser vision, and took the new codename Supervision.

== Powers ==
Bridget Flynn has superhuman abilities related to her eyesight, which include laser, x-ray, and telescopic vision, which were formerly the powers possessed by her brother, Hector Chang. Her powers appear to function exactly as her brother's did. Her laser vision is used as an offensive weapon and can be used to neutralize human opponents and large objects. They also possess a concussive aspect that can batter targets and demolish walls. Her x-ray vision allows her to see through solid objects. Her brother also possessed telescopic vision, allowing him to see great distances, but Bridget has not yet been depicted displaying this ability. Bridget wears goggles that, like the helmet formerly worn by her brother, focuses her laser blasts, making them more concentrated. Despite the power she wields, she is reluctant to kill or cause life-threatening injury in battle.

In her former identity of Scrap, Bridget had superhuman strength and invulnerability, allowing her to lift tanks over her head, throw them the length of a city block, and destroy large powered armor suits by kicking them, without sustaining any injury. Her strength allowed her to leap across rooftops without enough force to cause damage to the target rooftop upon landing. Her invulnerability allowed her on one occasion to easily survive being pushed off a skyscraper by her half-sister Synergy (who also possesses their father's superhuman strength), smashed through the street below to a set of underground subway tracks, and further kicks to the abdomen by Synergy, without more than a moment's incapacitation. She could easily shrug off automatic weapons fire. On the other hand, electricity of a sufficient power level could temporarily stun her, and a direct punch from the supervillain Brawn was able to knock her into unconsciousness or semi-consciousness for several moments. After her first encounter with the villain Bonechill, she practiced holding her breath, until she could hold it for twenty minutes, though it has not been indicated whether this ability was afforded by her former strength and invulnerability.

== See also ==
- Ramjet
