= Smasher (Image Comics) =

- Smasher, from Dynamo 5 #25 (October 2009). Art by Joe Eisma.

Publication information
- Publisher: Image Comics
- First appearance: Dynamo 5 #1 (January 2007)
- Created by: Jay Faerber; Mahmud A. Asrar

In-story information
- Alter ego: Hector Chang
- Species: Superhuman
- Team affiliations: Dynamo 5
- Notable aliases: Visionary
- Abilities: Superhuman strength Invulnerability; Formerly: Laser/x-ray/telescopic vision

Hector Chang is a comic book superhero, a member of the superhero team Dynamo 5, which appears in the series of the same name from Image Comics. Created by writer Jay Faerber and artist Mahmud A. Asrar, Visionary first appeared in Dynamo 5 #1 (January 2007).

For the first 24 issues of the series, the character possessed laser, telescopic and x-ray vision, and went by the codename Visionary. In issue #25 of the series (October 2009), the character, whose powers had been erased in the previous issue, obtained different powers. Now possessing superhuman strength and invulnerability, he goes by the name Smasher.

== Publication history ==
Captain Dynamo, a superhero who first appeared in Noble Causes: Extended Family #2 (June 2004) was depicted as a womanizing philanderer, and in Dynamo 5 #1 (January 2007), it was revealed, after he was assassinated, that he had fathered a number of illegitimate children. His widow, former agent of the government superhuman-monitoring agency, F.L.A.G., posing as a now-retired investigative reporter Maddie Warner, gathered five of these children in order to form a team to protect Tower City in Captain Dynamo's absence. One of these was 15-year-old Vancouver, British Columbia high school geek Hector Chang. the youngest of the five. Warner exposed Hector and his four half-siblings to the same energy that gave Captain Dynamo his powers 40 years earlier, unlocking their latent powers. Hector developed his father's vision-related powers, and took the codename Visionary as a member of Dynamo 5.

During the series' first year of publication in 2007, Hector and the other members of Dynamo 5 were shown confronting various threats to Tower City, as well as the U.S. government's superhuman-monitoring agency, F.L.A.G., which disapproved of their activities, while dealing with the personal conflicts that arose as a result of discovering four new half-siblings, as well as the effect that their new lives had on their personal lives at home. Hector in particular, who was conceived during a one-night stand between his mother, Jennifer, and Captain Dynamo (who had used his shapeshifting powers to disguise himself as a Chinese man), and lacked a strong male role model growing up, came to look up to Dynamo, whom he saw as his "Dad". He also came into conflict with Jennifer when she discovered his superhero life, much to her horror, and who was outraged at the danger in which Maddie Warner had placed her son.

Hector Chang, in his previous identity of Visionary. From Dynamo 5 #1. Art by Mahmud A. Asrar.

This led into a 2008 storyline in which Warner was rendered into a coma, the team's underwater headquarters, the Aquarium, was flooded, and it was discovered that Visionary's teammate and half-brother, Spencer, was a half-extraterrestrial with an alien physiognomy who had manifested his shapeshifting ability years earlier, and not when the members of the team first met. These developments, along with the problems that their superhero lives inflicted on their personal lives, led to the dissolution of the team. Eventually, the siblings reunited, and reformed the team.

In a 2009 storyline in issues 24 and 25 of the series, the team was attacked by their other half-sibling, the supervillain Synergy, who used a weapon to erase the team's abilities and capture them. The team freed themselves, and used the weapon to restore their powers, but they manifested different abilities than the ones they previously had. Hector found that he and his sister Bridget, had switched their powers. Now possessing superhuman strength and invulnerability, Hector took the new codename Smasher.

In the 2010 miniseries Dynamo 5: Sins of the Father, the team faced off against the three extraterrestrial sons of Dominex, who threatened the entire planet Earth. The combined might of Dynamo 5 and several other allies failed to defeat them, and after one of the sons impaled Emily with a street sign, Hector borrowed the Winterbourne Institute's strength-amplifying Strong-Suit, and used it to kill all three of the sons, including the one who injured Emily, who had surrendered. This shocked bystanders and people watching the battle on television, and caused much consternation for his teammates. The team was not reassured by Hector's statements of regret, as the telepathic Spencer related to the others that these statements were not sincere, as Hector held no remorse for the killing the sons. Hector's relationship with Emily was also threatened, as her mother, Rebecca, blamed Hector for allowing her to confront the sons of Dominex, and not only forbade them for seeing each other, but had Emily's powers removed.

== Powers ==
As the superhero Visionary, Hector Chang had abilities related to his eyesight, which included laser, telescopic and x-ray vision. His laser vision was used as an offensive weapon, and could be used to neutralize human opponents, and large objects such as armored tanks. His laser vision also possessed a concussive aspect that could batter targets and demolish walls. His x-ray vision allowed him to see through solid objects, and his telescopic vision allowed him to see great distances. The helmet Visionary wore included a visor that focused his later blasts, making them more concentrated.

After losing his vision-based powers, Hector Chang gained the superhuman strength and invulnerability that previously been possessed by his sister, Scrap, which appear to function exactly as they did when she possessed them. Although Smasher has not been observed using these powers for long, when his sister employed them, she could lift tanks over her head, throw them the length of a city block, and destroy large powered armor suits by kicking them, without sustaining any injury. She could also shrug off automatic weapons fire, and on one occasion, fell off a skyscraper, was smashed through the street below, and endured further kicks to the abdomen by the superhumanly strong villain Synergy, without more than a moment's incapacitation. On the other hand, electricity of a sufficient power level could temporarily stun her, and a direct punch from the supervillain Brawn was able to knock her into unconsciousness or semi-consciousness for several moments.

Hector's strength can further be enhanced when wearing the Winterbourne Institute's Strong-Suit, which amplifies the wearer's physical strength. Whereas the suit can normally grant superhuman strength to a normal human who wears it, it amplifies Hector's already-superhuman strength to such a degree that he can easily defeat opponents who normally cannot be dispatched by even entire teams of superhumans. In Dynamo 5: Sins of the Father #5, he was able to decapitate each of the sons of Dominex with one punch each, despite the fact that they could previously not be defeated by the combined efforts of Dynamo 5, the Primaries (a government team that included a clone of Captain Dynamo), Invincible, Emily Reed, and the son and daughter of Savage Dragon.

== See also ==
- Dynamo 5
- Supervision
- Wraith
- Menagerie
- Ramjet
- Captain Dynamo
- Maddie Warner
