= Maddie Warner =

Fictional comic book character

- Maddie Warner calling the shots in Dynamo 5's headquarters in Dynamo 5 #1. Art by Mahmud A. Asrar.

Publication information
- Publisher: Image Comics
- First appearance: Dynamo 5 #1 (March 2007)
- Created by: Jay Faerber; Mahmud A. Asrar

In-story information
- Full name: Madeline Warner
- Species: Human
- Team affiliations: Dynamo 5
- Abilities: Expert in government espionage, investigative skills, journalism, etc.

Madeline Warner is a comic book character, the mentor and leader of the superhero team Dynamo 5, who appears in the monthly series of the same name by Image Comics. Created by writer Jay Faerber, Warner first appeared in Dynamo 5 #1 (January 2007).

== Fictional character biography ==
Madeline Warner was born Madeline Moyer. She was an agent of F.L.A.G., a U.S. government organization that deals with threats posed by superhuman beings, though she used the cover of an award-winning investigative journalist. Her partner was Augie Ford. She first met Captain Dynamo (aka William Warner), the much-beloved protector of Tower City during a mission in which Dynamo saved her from the supervillain Red Scare. She eventually ended an engagement with a man named Tom in order to be with Captain Dynamo. They eventually married, though over the years, Dynamo's career as a costumed crimefighter often kept him away from home for extended periods of time, which put a strain on their marriage. Dynamo's absences were partially due to the numerous extramarital affairs that he had, including one in which he fathered a daughter with his archenemy, Chrysalis, whom he helped to raise, though Warner was unaware of this. Warner eventually retired from F.L.A.G. Following an argument with Warner over his absences, Dynamo engaged in a sexual liaison with the assassin Widowmaker, who killed Dynamo for an as-yet-unnamed client.

Although Warner did not know this at the time, she did suspect that the condition and setting in which his body was found was not natural, but arranged by whoever murdered him in order to further tarnish his image. In sorting through his personal effects, Warner discovered his little black book, which was filled with detailed information on countless incidents of infidelity on his part. Although devastated by the extent of her late husband’s indiscretions, Warner was faced with the problem of Dynamo’s numerous enemies, who would now take advantage of Tower City in his absence. Although other superheroes attempted to pitch in to keep the peace, Warner decided that Tower City needed a permanent protector.

Scouring through the information she gleaned from her husband’s belongings, she located five young people she believed could be his illegitimate children: Vancouver, British Columbia high school geek Hector Chang, Washington DC law student and activist Olivia “Livvie” Lewis, aimless ne'er do well and ladies’ man Spencer Bridges, Hollywood, California theater employee and NYU Film School graduate Bridget Flynn, and Eastbridge, Texas high school football star Gage Reinhart. Gathering them together, Warner exposed the five to the same radiation that Dynamo had been exposed to forty years earlier, unlocking their own latent superhuman abilities, with each one manifesting one of the five powers that their father possessed. Donning costumes and codenames, the five of them carry on his legacy as the superhero team the Dynamo 5, while coming to terms with learning about the father they never knew, and the four new half-siblings they each now have. Warner is determined to mold them not only into a team, but into a family as well, and functions as their mentor and “unofficial sixth member”, keeping in constant remote contact with them during their missions from the Aquarium, the same headquarters once used by Captain Dynamo.

Warner learned that Captain Dynamo also fathered Synergy with Chrysalis, and helped raise her, when the two supervillainesses kidnapped Warner. Warner foiled their attempt to murder her, had Scatterbrain wipe Synergy's memories, and left her in the care of a parish orphanage.

Warner was eventually confronted by Widowmaker, who invaded the Aquarium with a group of the team's assembled adversaries, for the purpose of killing the team. Widowmaker revealed that it was she who killed Captain Dynamo. During the encounter, Warner fell into a comatose state as a result of a telepathic attack by the villainess Brains. She was eventually brought out of this state by the telepath Scatterbrain.

In a 2009 storyline, it was revealed that when Warner left her fiance two weeks before their wedding 20 years previously, they had a son, Michael who was a few years old at the time. Michael tried to get revenge on Warner by allying himself with Synergy, with whom he erased Dynamo 5's powers and captured them, with the intention of killing them. However, the team freed themselves and restored their powers, and when Synergy discovered that Michael had no intention of helping her free her own imprisoned mother, she abandoned him, leaving him for Dynamo 5 to turn him over to the authorities.

== Personality ==
Warner is determined to mold Dynamo 5 not only into a team, but into a family as well, and functions as their mentor and “unofficial sixth member”. Although she must deal with the fact that they are constant reminders of her late husband’s infidelity, she is insistent that they act not only as a team, but as a family as well. Visionary has described her as "a hard one to warm up", "no nonsense, all business", and "more of a drill instructor than a den mother."

Warner has also been depicted as a long-term tactician willing to resort to creative solutions to problems, including those that might be considered ethically questionable. Two weeks after Warner began training Dynamo 5 to act as a team, the team began to chafe under her strict demands, and insisted that they were ready for their first mission. In response, she sent them to Tower City, where they were soundly beaten by a quintet of villains who, unbeknownst to Dynamo 5, were really Warner's allies, the Noble Family, in disguise, whom Warner enlisted to prove her point to the team that they were not yet ready.

Warner's use of radical, even dangerous ideas extends to life-threatening situations. Following the defeat of the reptilian monster known as Whiptail, she absconded with several vials of the serum that transforms humans into the creature. She saved these vials for a "rainy day", and later injected herself with a vial of the serum when she was about to murdered by the villainesses Chrysalis and Synergy, even though being transformed into Whiptail renders a person completely feral, and lacking in their human intelligence or judgment. Although Dynamo 5 had been captured by F.L.A.G. at this point, and Warner had no way to plan the scenario beyond using the serum to escape her would-be murderers, their battle took them from Chrysalis' mountain hideout to Tower City, where the escaped Dynamo 5 eventually intervened. After Warner was rendered unconscious by Scrap, she reverted to her human form.

Despite her matronly role and demeanor with the team, Warner can be ruthless with enemies that she perceives to be threats, and will not hesitate to kill them, as she did with The Superior, the leader of an organization called The Veil, that had kidnapped Visionary, even though Visionary had been returned, and the Superior had been captured. Remarking on the fact that the team is unaware that she is a former agent of F.LA.G., she commented ominously in Dynamo 5 #1, “Kind of makes you wonder what else I never told them, doesn’t it?” Warner's uncompromising willingness to achieve her goals have also brought her into conflict with members of the team and their loved ones. Gage's difficulty in finding time for both his high school career and his superheroics, has led to sleeplessness, and tension between him and Warner. Jennifer Chang, the mother of Hector Chang (aka Visionary), after discovering his son's life as a superhero, was angered at learning that Warner exposed her son to a heavy dose of radiation to unlock his powers, and after having Hector introduce them, she threatened to report Warner to the authorities for what she regarded as child endangerment and possibly kidnapping. Warner insisted that because his children shared Captain Dynamo's DNA, the radiation posed no risk to them, and speculated that Jennifer's ire was motivated more from feeling abandoned by the man who seduced her, but Jennifer was not amused by this statement.

When probing her memories during his attempt to bring her out of her coma, Scatterbrain observed that Warner tends to accept a disproportionate amount of responsibility for various unfortunate events in her life, and harbors guilt over those incidents. It was in convincing Warner of her need to move beyond her guilt that Scatterbrain was able to bring her out of the coma.
