= Slingshot (disambiguation) =

A slingshot is a small hand-powered projectile weapon.

Slingshot may also refer to:

== Technology ==
- Gravitational slingshot, the use of a planet's gravity to alter the path and speed of a spacecraft
- Slingshot (ISP), a New Zealand internet service provider
- Slingshot (water vapor distillation system), an invention by Dean Kamen
- Slungshot, or slingshot, a maritime tool
- Slingshot, a part of a pinball machine

=== Amusement rides ===
- Slingshot ride, or reverse bungee, a type of amusement ride
- SlingShot (Cedar Fair), a reverse bungee ride at Cedar Fair amusement parks in Canada and the US

=== Vehicles ===
- Dodge Slingshot, a 2004 concept car
- Front engine dragster, or slingshot, a variety of drag race car
- Kolb Slingshot, an ultralight aircraft
- Polaris Slingshot, a three-wheeled motor vehicle
- Plymouth Slingshot, a 1988 concept car

== Film, television and comics ==
- The Slingshot (film), a 1993 Swedish film
- Slingshot (2005 film), an American film
- Slingshot (2024 film), an American sci-fi film
- SlingShot, a 2014 documentary about Segway inventor Dean Kamen
- The Slingshot, a 2009 South Korean television series
- Agents of S.H.I.E.L.D.: Slingshot, a 2016 American web series
- "Slingshot" (Thunderbirds Are Go), a television episode
- Slingshot (comics), a set index article listing several characters, including:
  - Menagerie (Image Comics) or Slingshot
  - Silk Spectre (Laurie Juspeczyk) or Slingshot, a character in the DC Comics series Watchmen
  - Slingshot (Transformers), a television and comics character
  - Yo-Yo Rodriguez, in Marvel Comics

== Music ==
- Slingshot (band), an American disco/dance band
- Slingshot (album) or the title song, by Michael Henderson, 1981
- "Slingshot", a song by the Black Seeds from Solid Ground, 2008
- "Slingshot", a song by Gaelic Storm from Bring Yer Wellies, 2006
- "Slingshot", a song by Jimmy G and the Tackheads from Federation of Tackheads, 1985
- "Slingshot", a song by Lil Xan from Total Xanarchy, 2017

== Other uses ==
- Sling swimsuit or slingshot
- Slingshot argument, a type of argument in philosophical logic
- Slingshot (wrestling), a professional wrestling aerial technique
- Slingshot (whiskey), an Israeli made Kentucky styled whiskey

== See also ==
- Sling (disambiguation)
