= Spencer Bridges =

Spencer Bridges may refer to:

- Spencir Bridges, an actor in the film Daddy Day Camp
- Spencer Bridges, the secret identity of the Image Comics character Myriad
