= The Menagerie =

A menagerie is a historical form of keeping wild and exotic animals in captivity.

Menagerie or The Menagerie may refer to:

- Menagerie (album), a 1977 album by Bill Withers
- Menagerie (DC Comics), two DC Comics characters, Pamela in 2001, and Sonja in 2004, connected with the Elite and Justice League Elite
- Menagerie (Image Comics), a 2007 Image Comics character, Olivia Lewis, and member of Dynamo 5
- Menagerie, a version of the comic character Beast Boy
- "Menagerie" (Supergirl), a 2019 episode of Supergirl
- The Menagerie (Star Trek: The Original Series), 1966, the only two-part episode of Star Trek: The Original Series
- The Menagerie (novel), 1995, by Martin Day
- The Menagerie (series), a 2004 dark fantasy novel series by Christopher Golden and Thomas E. Sniegoski
- The Menagerie (professional wrestling), a 2014-2015 pro wrestling stable

== See also ==
- Menagerie (comics)
- Zoo (disambiguation)
