= Point of Impact (comics) =

Comic Series

- Cover to "Point of Impact" #1, art by Koray Kuranel

Publication information
- Publisher: Image Comics
- Schedule: Monthly
- Format: Limited series
- Genre: Crime comics
- Publication date: October 2012 – January 2013
- No. of issues: 4

Creative team
- Created by: Jay Faerber
- Written by: Jay Faerber
- Artist(s): Koray Kuranel

Point of Impact is a four-issue limited comic series created and written by American Jay Faerber with art by Turkish Koray Kuranel published through Image Comics. The first issue was released in October 2012.

The story follows three characters as they lead separate investigations into the murder of a woman.

== Publication history ==
Faerber and Kuranel were introduced by their mutual friend Yildiray Cinar, who had worked with Faerber on the comic Noble Causes. Despite speaking different languages, they had no trouble communicating. Faerber made the decision to print the book in black and white, partly because "not having a colorist is one less mouth to feed". Kuranel was happy with this decision, as "black and white is the most impressive form in comics for [him]".

The first issue was printed by Image Comics on 10 October 2012. After the completion of the series in 2013, Faerber has no plans to revisit the characters.

== Plot ==
After a woman is tossed off a building, her murder is investigated by her husband, who is an investigative reporter, her lover, who is a former US marine, and her friend, who is a homicide detective.

== Critical reception ==
Orders for the first issue exceeded the expectations of both Faerber and Image publisher Eric Stephenson. Based on 18 critical reviews, Point of Impact received an average score of 7.7/10 according to review aggregator website Comic Book Roundup. Geeksunleashed called it "a gripping, provocative four-part crime series". Comicbastards praised the consistency of Kuranel's art, and gave the first issue a 4/5 rating.
