= Rodeo Strip =

Turkish comics magazine

Rodeo Strip was a monthly comics magazine published in Turkey between October 2004 - May 2006. The magazine is known as the longest living effort in 21st century Turkey's authentic comics publications.

== History and profile ==
Rodeo Strip was first published in 2004. The magazine was created and edited by Murat Mihcioglu, who also scripted some of the content. The publisher was Promat. The magazine was based in Istanbul.

Turkish comic creators including Mahmud Asrar, Yıldıray Çınar, Cem Özüduru, Yalcin Didman, Ersin Burak, Murat Bozkurt, Yasemin Ezberci, Murat Kalkavan and Caner Atakul were active in the magazine. Yalcin Didman and Cem Özüduru went on to work with the magazine to create graphic novels.

Some Bonelli comics like Dylan Dog and Brendon also appeared in the pages of Rodeo Strip.
