= Ramjet (disambiguation) =

A ramjet is an airbreathing jet engine that uses the engine's forward motion to compress incoming air.

Ramjet may also refer to:

- Ramjet (Transformers), a fictional character in the Transformers toyline
- Ramjet (Image Comics), a superhero and member of Dynamo 5
- Bussard ramjet, a theoretical form of spacecraft propulsion
- Rochester Ramjet, an automotive fuel injection

== See also ==
- Roger Ramjet, an animated television comedy
- Nemo Ramjet, pen name of C. M. Kosemen, Turkish artist and author
