= Yıldıray =

Yıldıray is a Turkish given name. Notable people with the name include:

- Yıldıray Baştürk (born 1978), Turkish footballer
- Yıldıray Çınar (born 1976), Turkish comic book artist
