= Menagerie (comics) =

In comics, Menagerie may refer to:

- Menagerie (DC Comics), two DC Comics characters connected with the Elite and Justice League Elite
- Menagerie (Image Comics), an Image Comics character and member of Dynamo 5

== See also ==
- Menagerie (disambiguation)
