= Ramjet (Image Comics) =

- Ramjet, from Dynamo 5 #25 (October 2009). Art by Fran Bueno.

Publication information
- Publisher: Image Comics
- First appearance: Dynamo 5 #1 (January 2007)
- Created by: Jay Faerber; Mahmud A. Asrar

In-story information
- Alter ego: Gage Reinhart
- Species: Superhuman
- Team affiliations: Dynamo 5
- Notable aliases: Scatterbrain
- Abilities: Flight; Formerly: Telepathy; Astral projection

Gage Reinhart is a character appearing in publications by Image Comics. Created by writer Jay Faerber and artist Mahmud A. Asrar, he first appeared in Dynamo 5 #1 (January 2007).

For the first 24 issues of the series, the character possessed telepathy, and went by the codename Scatterbrain. In issue #25 of the series (October 2009), the character, whose powers had been erased in the previous issue, obtained different powers. Now possessing the power of flight, he goes by the codename Ramjet.

== Publication history ==
Following the assassination of Captain Dynamo, the much-beloved superhero protector of Tower City, his widow, former government agent posing as a now-retired investigative reporter Maddie Warner, discovered from his personal effects that he had been unfaithful to her countless times. Despite her devastation at this discovery, Warner realized that without a full-time protector, Tower City would be vulnerable to Captain Dynamo's legion of supervillain enemies. She used her skills and the information she discovered to track down five people who could be Dynamo's illegitimate children.

Gage Reinhart was the fifth of Captain Dynamo's children Warner contacted. Reinhart is a 17-year-old Eastbridge, Texas high school football star who led his division in tackles for the entire season, and is the darling of both his female schoolmates and college scouts. Faerber has described Reinhart as "a popular, arrogant jock who never gave a damn about what anyone thought - until he can literally hear those thoughts. And he may not like what he hears." Gathering all five of the children together, Warner exposed them to the same unidentified radiation that gave Captain Dynamo his powers forty years earlier, unlocking their powers. Reinhart inherited his father's telepathy. Reinhart takes the codename Scatterbrain, and works to protect Tower City with his newly discovered brothers and sisters.

Gage Reinhart, in his previous identity of Scatterbrain. From Dynamo 5 #1. Art by Mahmud A. Asrar.

Reinhart is often instrumental in the team's confrontations with its adversaries. One month after gaining his abilities, Reinhart and his siblings fought the paramilitary organization known as The Veil. Although he and the team acquitted themselves well against that foe, Visionary was kidnapped during the fracas, and brought to The Veil's base. It fell upon Reinhart to use his telepathy to track Visionary via his brainwave pattern, which led to Visionary's rescue. Reinhart was subsequently crucial to the team's victories against Voltage, and a thief using the Winterbourne Institute's strength-amplifying Strong-Suit.

Despite his telepathy's usefulness, however, Reinhart has laments the adverse side-effects that his powers and his involvement in the team has had on his life. His inability to fully control his telepathy, his tendency to pick up the thoughts of others that he finds hurtful, and the manner in which new aspects of it may suddenly evolve unexpectedly, have been a source of irritation to him, often causing him to long for a more empowering ability like his sister Olivia's flight. The difficulty in finding time for both his high school career and his superheroics leads to some sleeplessness, and tension between him and Maddie Warner. Reinhart also comes to blows with his brother Spencer (Myriad) over Spencer engaging in a romantic embrace with a schoolmate of Reinhart's while Spencer, a shape-shifter, was impersonating Reinhart when Reinhart was in a coma. Spencer was given this mission by Maddie Warner in order to quell suspicion on the part of Reinhart's family, who are unaware of his life as a superhero, but Reinhart saw this act as an invasion of privacy on Spencer's part, though Spencer wonders if it is motivated by racism because the girl in question was black. Spencer apologizes to Reinhart, and confesses that, having grown up in foster homes, and having never had a real family or popularity in school, his experience with Reinhart's family opened his eyes to what he had missed all his life, and got carried away. Sympathetic to Spencer's feelings, Reinhart forgave him.

In Dynamo 5 #24 and 25 of the series, the team was attacked by their other half-sibling, the supervillain Synergy, who used a weapon to erase the team's abilities and capture them. The team freed themselves, and used the weapon to restore their powers, but they manifested different abilities than the ones they previously had. Reinhart, who gained the power of flight, donned an armored suit and took the codename Ramjet.

In the Dynamo 5 Holiday Special 2010, it is established that Reinhart began a romantic relationship with War Chest, a reformed supervillain turned government agent, whom Reinhart had first battled in Dynamo 5 #0.

== Powers ==
Gage Reinhart has the superhuman power of flight. Whereas his sister Olivia wore a wingsuit-type outfit to aid her maneuverability, Gage's natural aptitude at maneuvering makes this unnecessary. However, his ability to effect sudden stops and land properly is far inferior to hers, and thus he wears an armored suit that not only protects him from impact, but enables him to act as a human battering ram, from which his current codename is derived. Maddie Warner's ally, Tank, who built the armor, indicated to Reinhart that it could allow him to smash right through a building. He can reach hypersonic speeds when flying.

In his former identity of Scatterbrain, Reinhart was a telepath who could read other people's minds. His power was both voluntary and passive. While he could use his power to deliberately read someone's mind, he could also involuntarily pick up the thoughts of those around him, even when he did not wish it. He could also use his telepathy to remotely track people whose minds he has read, by sifting through the brainwave patterns he could sense, which are apparently unique to each individual. During an electrical attack by the villain Voltage, Reinhart developed the ability to cease the attack by merely thinking about it, and rendered Voltage unconscious. It also briefly knocked Reinhart into semi-consciousness. Reinhart also had the ability to completely wipe out a person's memories, giving them total amnesia, as he did with his half-sister Synergy, though this act left him in a coma for a day or two, and the effect on Synergy (who possesses superhuman invulnerability) was reversed with the impact of a bullet to her head. During his coma, Reinhart discovered that he was also capable of astral projection, and was able to instantly transport his astral self to familiar locations by willing it. He appeared at his high school, where he was attacked by the telepathic villainess Brains. Brains claimed that the location was "her space" and "her private place", and engaged Reinhart in what was depicted as a physical altercation between their astral forms, but when Reinhart responded in kind, he inadvertently transported them to a featureless white location that he speculated was "his place", and was able to manifest his abilities according to his own imagination, multiplying his form several times, and attacking Brains en masse, forcing her to flee the astral plane, and bringing him out of his coma. His telepathy rendered him immune to the illusions created by the villain Doctor Chimera. It also enabled him to affect technology keyed to a specific person's brainwaves, as when he disabled the Jessup-Poole Strong-Suit, which was keyed to its user's brainwaves, though the suit was later modified to prevent Reinhart from doing this.

There were some limits on Reinhart's telepathy. He could not read someone's mind if they were unconscious, although he was able to enter Maddie Warner's mind when she was in a coma in order to communicate with her consciousness and pull her out of that state. When Reinhart attempted to telepathically probe the mind of the psychotic Lipinski (aka Slaughterhouse), the experience was so emotionally traumatic for Reinhart that it briefly incapacitated him in the heat of battle. The government superhuman-monitoring agency F.L.A.G. has a manual and a course it requires for its agents who interrogate telepaths like Reinhart, in order to prevent the compromise of sensitive information, but its exact protocols have not been revealed. It does include maintaining a particular distance from telepaths like Reinhar, whose telepathy operates within a certain reception radius, but that radius has not been specified.

== See also ==
- Supervision
