= Point of Impact =

Point of Impact may refer to:

== Literature ==
- Point of Impact (Stephen Hunter novel), 1993
- Point of Impact, a 2001 novel in the Tom Clancy's Net Force series written by Steve Perry
- Point of Impact, a 1985 romance novel by Emma Darcy
- Point of Impact (comics), a comic by Jay Faerber and Koray Kuranel

== Entertainment ==
- Point of Impact (film), a 1993 film starring Michael Paré and Barbara Carrera
- Burnout 2: Point of Impact, a 2002-2003 video game in the Burnout series
- "Point of Impact" (CSI: Miami), a 2009 episode of CSI: Miami

== See also ==
- Ballistic impact
