= Widowmaker (Image Comics) =

2006 comic book supervillain

- Widowmaker, from Dynamo 5 #11 (March 2008). Art by Mahmud A. Asrar.

Publication information
- Publisher: Image Comics
- First appearance: Noble Causes #18 (March 2006)
- Created by: Jay Faerber; Fran Bueno

In-story information
- Alter ego: Unknown
- Species: Human
- Team affiliations: Hunter Blackthorne
- Abilities: Professional assassin; Martial arts.

Widowmaker is a comic book supervillain appearing the Image Comics series Noble Causes and Dynamo 5. Created by writer Jay Faerber and artist Fran Bueno, Widowmaker first appeared in Noble Causes #18 (March 2006), in which she was hired to assassinate Captain Dynamo, which she did with poison. She then took a job from Hunter Blackthorne to attack Race and Liz Noble, only to be double-crossed by the Blackthornes. She spent some time in hiding in a safehouse provided by Slate Blackthorne. Eventually, the person who hired her to kill Captain Dynamo hired her to kill Dynamo 5. To that end, she has formed alliances with various super-criminals in order to fulfill her contract.
