= Copperhead (Image Comics) =

Comic book series by Jay Faerber and Scott Godlewski

- Cover of Copperhead #1

Publication information
- Publisher: Image Comics
- Schedule: Monthly
- Format: Ongoing series
- Genre: Space Western
- Publication date: September 2014 to present
- No. of issues: 19
- Main character: Clara Bronson

Creative team
- Created by: Jay Faerber and Scott Godlewski
- Written by: Jay Faerber
- Artist(s): Scott Godlewski and Drew Moss
- Letterer: Thomas Mauer
- Colorist: Ron Riley

Copperhead is a Space Western comic book series written by Jay Faerber and illustrated by Scott Godlewski, published monthly by American company Image Comics.

The first issue of Copperhead was published on September 10, 2014, to positive reviews and a sold-out first printing. The first five-issue story arc was published in trade paperback form in March 2015.

Copperhead returned to the stands with issue 11 on March 8, 2017, when Jay Faerber was joined by artist Drew Moss, but is on hiatus since June 2018 (issue 19).

== Plot ==
The series is set on the fictional mining town of Copperhead in the 24th Century. The story focuses on the arrival of the town's new sheriff, Clara Bronson. Clara and her son have moved to Copperhead for unknown reasons, and as Sheriff she soon gets involved in the towns mysteries and secrets.

== Reception ==
The first issue sold out of its first printing on September 11, 2014 - the day after its release. A second printing was released on October 8, 2014. The second issue also sold out on its second day of release and a third printing was released on November 5, 2014.

The series has been generally well received. Writer Brian K. Vaughan called the series "...the best Image debut of the year" while reviews from Comic Book Resources and IGN praised the series artwork and its characters.

The series holds an average score of 8.5 out of 10 at the review aggregator website Comic Book Roundup. The first collected edition also holds a score of 8.5.

== Collected editions ==
The series is collected in trade paperbacks.

| Title | Binding | Material collected | Publication date | ISBN |
|---|---|---|---|---|
| Copperhead Volume One: A New Sheriff in Town | Trade Paperback | Copperhead #1-5 | March 11, 2015 | 978-1632152213 |
| Copperhead Volume Two | Trade Paperback | Copperhead #6-10 | November 4, 2015 | 978-1632154712 |
| Copperhead Volume Three | Trade Paperback | Copperhead #11-14 | August 30, 2017 | 978-1534302365 |
| Copperhead Volume Four | Trade Paperback | Copperhead #15-18 | March 28, 2018 | 978-1534304994 |
