= Near Death (comics) =

Comic book by Jay Faerber

- Cover art to issue #1, by Tomm Coker

Publication information
- Publisher: Image Comics
- Schedule: Monthly
- Format: Ongoing
- Genre: crime
- Publication date: September 2011 – September 2012
- No. of issues: 11
- Main character(s): Markham

Creative team
- Created by: Jay Faerber; Simone Guglielmini
- Written by: Jay Faerber
- Artist(s): Simone Guglielmini and Tomm Coker (Covers #1–5)
- Letterer(s): Charles Prichett
- Colorist(s): Ron Riley

Near Death is an ongoing comic book series created by Jay Faerber with artist Simone Guglielmini. Image Comics began publishing it in September 2011. The series went on hiatus following the eleventh issue in September 2012. An original graphic novel is scheduled for release in early 2019.

The story follows a former hitman who attempts to atone for his misdeeds after a near death experience shows him a vision of Hell.

== Publication history ==
Faerber credits the work of Stephen J. Cannell as his inspiration for the series, along with a personal attraction to redemption stories. After creating the plot himself, Faerber recruited Italian artist Guglielmini by email. During publication, the two never met in person or spoke on the phone. Guglielmini drew inspiration from Criminal and Gotham Central.

The series was published monthly beginning in 2011. Most issues were self-contained instead of multi-part stories because Faerber wanted a creative challenge. Each issue contains some form of bonus material, such as an article on crime fiction or a second, shorter comic.

The series has been collected into two square-bound volumes. The first, released February 2012, reprints the first five issues and includes a script for the first issue. Volume two, released in October 2012, reprints #6–11 and is 136 pages.

The series was put on hiatus following its eleventh issue in 2012. At the time, Faerber expressed an interest in continuing the story as a series of one-shots. An original graphic novel, Over My Dead Body, was released in 2020.

There has been an effort to adapt the comic to television.

== Plot ==
Markham, a hitman, is shot during an attempted murder and briefly dies on the operating table. He has a vision of Hell where he is haunted by the ghosts of people he has killed. One tells Markham there is still time to make up for his actions. When he recovers, Markham begins to protect people who are in danger. He confesses that he is doing this selfishly, and does not care about the people he saves.

After his former coworkers learn of his new direction, they try to kill Markham and his girlfriend. To avoid more confrontations, Markham moves to Los Angeles. He eventually turns himself into the police and is sent to jail.

== Critical reception ==
Near Death was featured in an article in USA Today and reviews of the first issue were mostly positive. In a March 2012 interview, Image publisher Eric Stephenson expressed frustration the book was not selling better. The series continued to receive positive reviews through its final issue. Faerber said the most common complaint he received about the series was the stories feeling "too short."
