= Menagerie (Image Comics) =

- Menagerie, from Dynamo 5 #25 (October 2009). Art by Anthony Castrillo.

Publication information
- Publisher: Image Comics
- First appearance: Dynamo 5 #1 (January 2007)
- Created by: Jay Faerber; Mahmud A. Asrar

In-story information
- Alter ego: Olivia Lewis
- Species: Superhuman
- Place of origin: Earth
- Team affiliations: Dynamo 5
- Notable aliases: Slingshot
- Abilities: Animal shapeshifting Formerly: Flight

Olivia "Livvie" Lewis is a comic book superheroine and a member of the superhero team Dynamo 5, which appears in the monthly series of the same name from Image Comics. Created by writer Jay Faerber and artist Mahmud A. Asrar, Slingshot first appeared in Dynamo 5 #1 (January 2007).

For the first 24 issues of the series, the character possessed the power of flight, and went by the codename Slingshot. In issue #25 of the series (October 2009), the character, whose powers had been erased in the previous issue, obtained different powers. Now possessing the power to shapeshift into any animal, she goes by the name Menagerie.

== Publication history ==
Olivia "Livvie" Lewis' biological mother died when Livvie was young enough to require her adoptive father and her mother's widow, Neil Lewis, a high-priced Washington DC lawyer, to learn how to cook. Livvie is a junior at Georgetown University, an overachiever, and a driven activist who is involved with half a dozen different volunteer organizations and extracurricular activities, which include working as a reporter for G.U.'s campus newspaper, The Hoya, and volunteering at a clinic, though her workaholic nature leaves less time for her boyfriend Derrick than he’d like.

Following the assassination of Captain Dynamo, the much-beloved superhero protector of Tower City, his widow, former government agent posing as a now-retired investigative reporter Maddie Warner, discovered from his personal effects that he had been unfaithful to her countless times. Despite her devastation at this discovery, Warner realized that without a full-time protector, Tower City would be vulnerable to Captain Dynamo’s legion of super-villain enemies. She used her skills and the information she discovered to track down five people who could be Dynamo’s illegitimate children.

Livvie was the second of Captain Dynamo’s children that Warner contacted, and the second oldest. Gathering all five of the children together, Warner exposed them to the same unidentified radiation that gave Captain Dynamo his powers forty years earlier, unlocking their powers. Livvie inherited her father’s ability of flight, took the codename Slingshot, and works to protect Tower City with her newly discovered brothers and sisters.

Olivia Lewis in her previous identity of Slingshot. From Dynamo 5 #1. Art by Mahmud A. Asrar.

As a member of Dynamo 5, Slingshot is dedicated and attentive. She is respectful and reserved towards Maddie Warner, usually referring to and addressing her as "Ma'am", or "Mrs. Warner", and eschewing profanity in her presence. She finds Warner's writings as a journalist to be "brilliant", and objects to her brother Spencer's view that this deference is an attempt on her part to "suck up" to Warner. She is not completely deferential to Warner, however. For example, in the team's first year, she angrily refuses to comply with Warner's order that she and her siblings stay in Tower City to protect it after she learned of her father's kidnapping.

Neil Lewis was kidnapped by the former employers of an assassin named Lionel Barstow. These employers blackmailed her into freeing Barstow, but after she and her siblings did so, Barstow killed his ex-employers with his "death touch". Barstow explained that after he was captured, his attorney, Neil Lewis, advised him to testify against his employers. Although Slingshot's siblings are outraged at learning that they freed a murderer, Slingshot is more concerned with getting her father to safety than returning Barstow to the authorities, a decision that later serves as a source of tension among the team. Livvie later finds Barstow and returns him to the authorities, despite his threat to use her secret identity as a bargaining chip with them.

Neil Lewis was profoundly disturbed to discover his daughter's secret when she rescued him, and pained to learn that Livvie's mother cheated on him with Captain Dynamo. Livvie, however, recalling her feeling of betrayal with Spencer, sympathized with him, but reassured him that because of Dynamo's shapeshifting ability, he could've impersonated Neil himself when he fathered Livvie, and that Livvie's mother may not have truly cheated on Neil.

In issues 24 and 25 of the series, the team was attacked by their other half-sibling, the supervillain Synergy, who used a weapon to erase the team's abilities and capture them. The team freed themselves, and used the weapon to restore their powers, but they manifested different abilities than the ones they previously had. Olivia found that she and her brother Spencer had switched their powers but, in her case, it was exhibited in a different way. Now possessing animal shapeshifting, she took the new codename Menagerie.

== Powers ==
Olivia Lewis has the superhuman ability to shapeshift into any animal. She can only shapeshift into real animals, and not fictional ones. Shapeshifting into too many different forms in a small span of time, as when, for example, she shapeshifted into five different animals in rapid succession during a training session shortly after receiving her powers, physically exhausts her. Of the five members of Dynamo 5, Olivia is the only one who received a superhuman ability in issue #25 that was not previously exhibited by one of her siblings. Unlike her brother, Spencer, who previously had shapeshifting abilities, Olivia cannot use her abilities to impersonate other people. Although Spencer ostensibly could not shapeshift into animals, Olivia has speculated that perhaps he could and simply did not know it, and that in general, much about her powers and those of her siblings remains unknown.

In her previous identity of Slingshot, Olivia had the ability to defy gravity, and fly under her own power. The top speed and altitude she could achieve unaided is unknown, but she was able to use this ability to be an effective fighter in battles. In one encounter with the reptilian monster known as Whiptail, she was able to fly around the creature fast enough to create a miniature tornado, causing him dizziness, without suffering any ill effects herself. Although she did not inherit her father’s superhuman strength, she was able to generate extra thrust while in flight, as she was able to carry another person when flying. She also used the speed she could generate while in flight to render an opponent unconscious with the impact of a single punch. Whether this is a physiological adaptation that manifested itself along with her flight power, or a result of reinforced gloves, has not been specified. Although she no longer has this power, she can, with her shapeshifting abilities, become an animal capable of flight, such as a bird.

== See also ==
- Smasher
- Supervision
- Ramjet
