= Yalçın Didman =

Turkish comic book creator

- Born: 1947 (age 78–79)
- Areas: Cartoonist, Writer, Artist

Yalçın Didman (born 1947) is a Turkish comic book creator. He worked for almost every major newspaper from the late 1960s to mid-'90s.

== Biography ==
Didman was part of the legendary humor magazine Girgir. After doing cartoons and humorous weekly comics, he converted to more realistic storytelling, which meant taking a huge risk of unemployment in the conditions of Turkish comic book tradition.

In the 1990s, Didman collaborated with another legendary name of Turkish comics history, Ergün Gündüz, within the framework of such short-lived magazines like Resimli Roman and Akrebin Gölgesi. For almost a decade, he remained unproductive. This period ended as he began to write and draw for Rodeo Strip.

Didman's masterwork is The Bear Rider, which was introduced to the reader in a 121-page-long first graphic novel adventure, Minus Eighty.
