= Yıldıray Çınar =

Turkish comic book artist (born 1976)

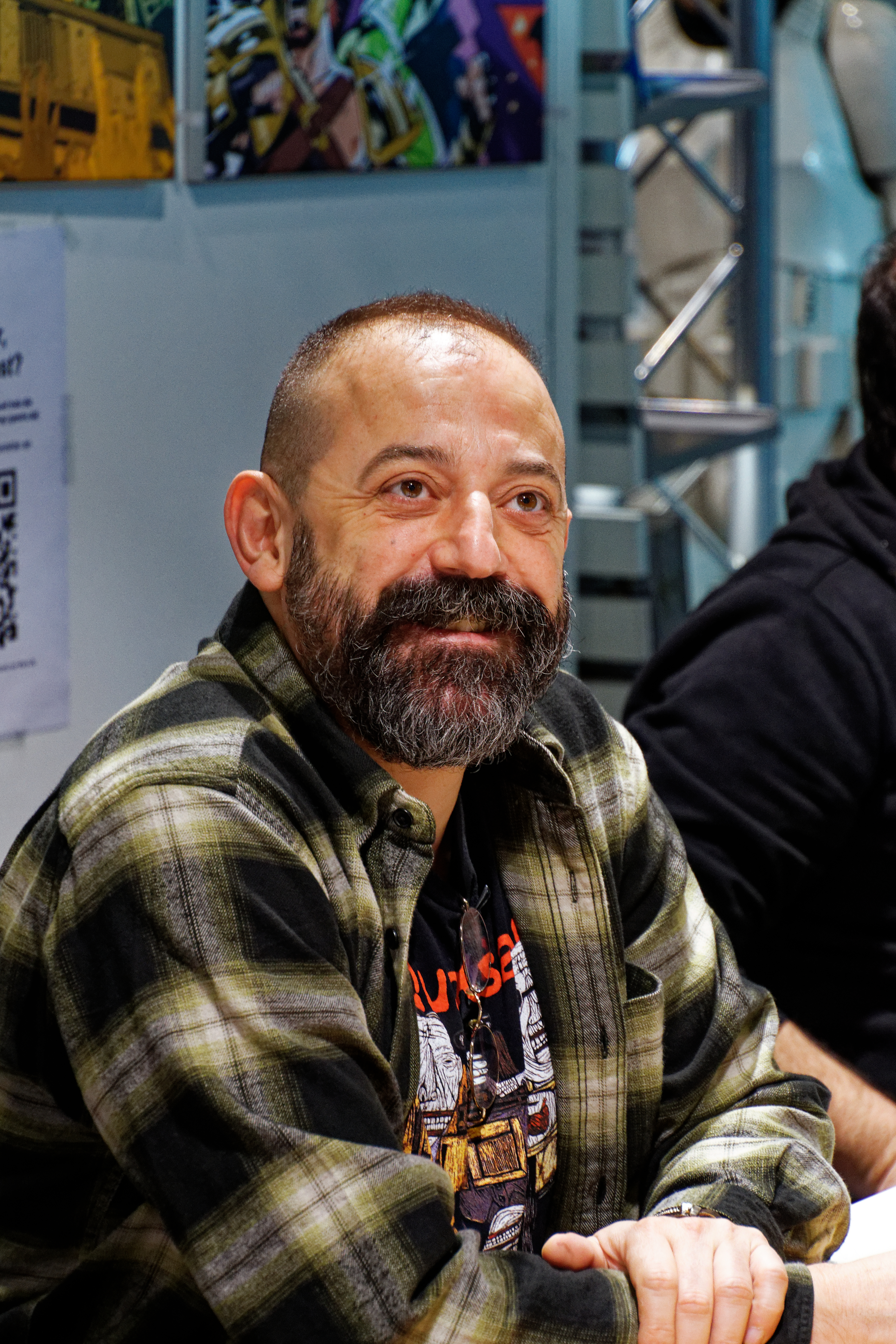
- Çınar at the ComicCon Stuttgart 2024
- Born: January 23, 1976 (age 50) Ankara, Turkey
- Areas: Penciller, Inker
- Notable works: Noble Causes

Yıldıray Çınar is a Turkish comic book artist known for his work on the American comic book Noble Causes.

== Career ==
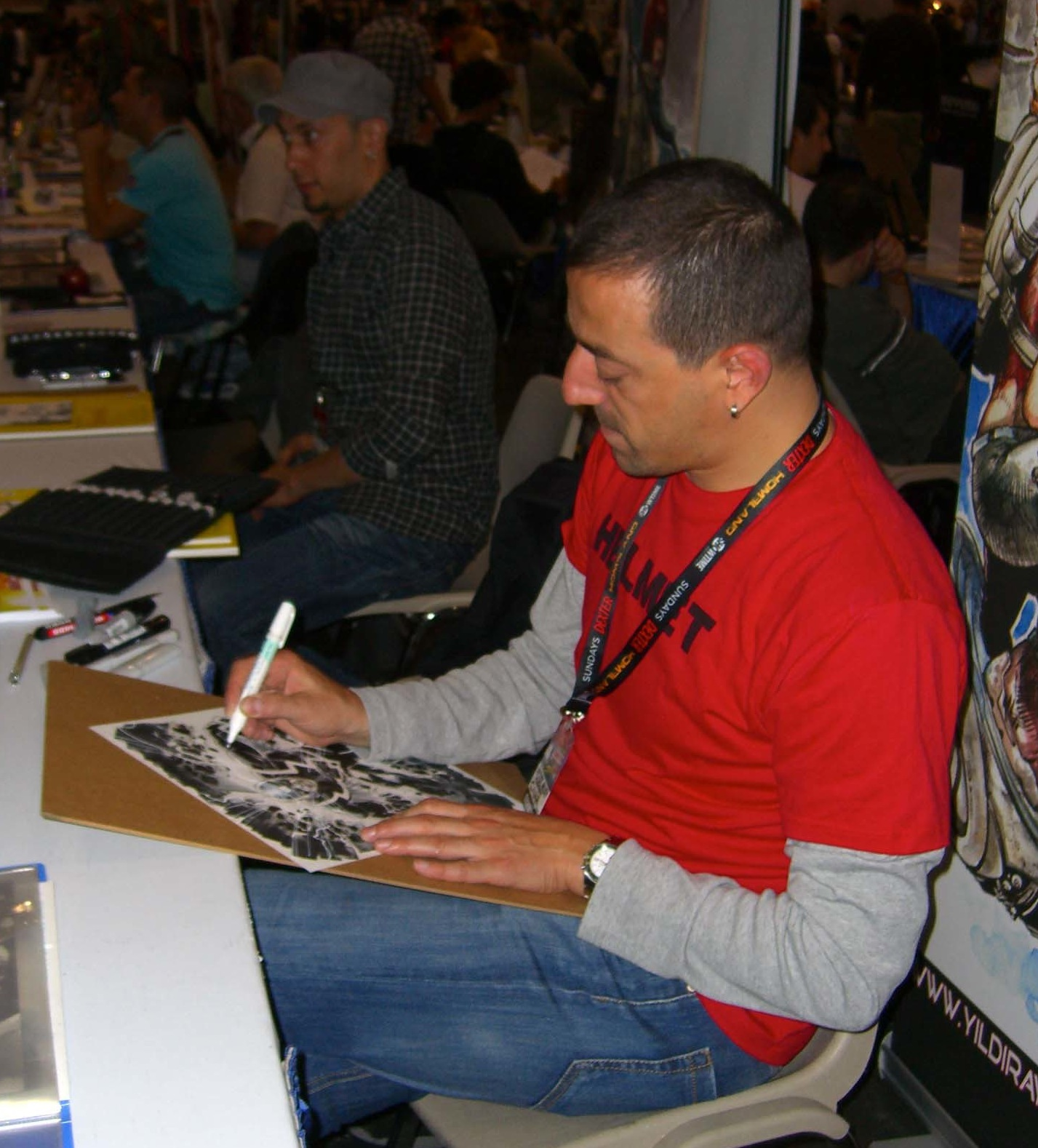
Çınar sketching at the New York Comic Con. To his left is fellow Turkish comics creator Mahmud A. Asrar.

Çınar helped create a photocopy-fanzine publishing group called Capa Comics group in 1997. Both Çınar and his colleagues have published their work in national magazines on several occasions, under common banners of Capa Comics group and the other publisher.

His creations from this time include Sürgün, Maskeli, Karabasan and İman Limited.

Although remaining in Istanbul, Çınar started producing for the American comic book market. He was first hooked up with Digital Webbing Press and illustrated stories of Nothingface and Fist of Justice which appeared in numerous issues of the anthology Digital Webbing Presents.

His Image Comics work began started with a pin-up he draw for Savage Dragon #118. He subsequently illustrated a short story for Savage Dragon #126.

Çınar later worked on Jay Faerber's Image series Noble Causes, on which he served as regular penciler beginning with #27.

After working on the DC Comics series Teen Titans, he began as the regular artist on Legion of Super-Heroes, which debuted in 2010 under veteran Legion writer Paul Levitz.

In November 2014, he was the artist of Superior Iron Man series at Marvel with writer Tom Taylor. During the Fall of X (August 2023 – June 2024) publishing initiative, Al Ewing concluded the ongoing X-Men Red with art by Çınar.

== Personal life ==
Çınar currently lives in Istanbul.

== Bibliography ==
=== Comics ===
- Savage Dragon #126 (short story)
- Nothingface GN (Digital Webbing)
- Nothingface short story (in Digital Webbing Presents #5)
- Fist of Justice (in Digital Webbing Presents #31)
- Noble Causes #27–40 (with Jay Faerber, Image Comics, February 2007 - March 2009)
- Tales of the Starlight Drive-In (Image Comics, July 2008)
- Dynamo 5 #14–16, 21–22 (with Jay Faerber, Image Comics, June–September 2008, April–June 2009)
- Teen Titans #69, 71–76, 79–82 (pencils, with Sean McKeever, DC Comics, May–December 2009)
- Action Comics #888 (cover, DC Comics, May–December 2009)
- Legion of Super-Heroes vol. 6 #1–16 (with Paul Levitz, DC Comics, May 2010-August 2011)
- Fury of Firestorm #1–6, #9–12, #0 (DC Comics, 2011)
- Earth 2 #7, #8, #13, #15.1 (DC Comics, 2012)
- Batman/Superman #3 (DC Comics, 2013)
- Adventures of Superman #5 (DC Comics, 2013)
- Worlds' Finest #9, #22 (DC Comics, 2013)
- Supergirl #26-31 (DC Comics, 2014)
- Superior Iron Man #1-4, 7, 9 (Marvel Comics, 2014–2015)
- Captain America: Steve Rogers (Vol. 1) #16 (Marvel Comics, 2017)
- Metal Men #1-6 (DC Comics, 2016)
- Cable #4-5 (Marvel Comics, 2017)
- Weapon X #12-14, #17-19, #22-23 (Marvel Comics, 2018)
- Friendly Neighborhood Spider-Man (Vol. 2) #5 (Marvel Comics, 2019)
- Guardians of the Galaxy Annual (Vol. 3) #1 (Marvel Comics, 2019)
- Uncanny X-Men #3, #6, #9 (Marvel Comics, 2019)
- The Marvels #1-12 (Marvel Comics, 2021–2022)
- Joe Fixit #1-5 (Marvel Comics, 2023)

=== Sketch cards ===
Sketch card work includes:

- Women of Marvel Sketch Cards (Rittenhouse Archives, 2008)
- Fantastic Four Archives Sketch Cards (Rittenhouse Archives, 2008)
- X-Men Origins: Wolverine Sketch Cards (Rittenhouse Archives, 2009)
- Spider-Man Archives Sketch Cards (Rittenhouse Archives, 2009)
