= Slingshot (whiskey) =

Israeli whiskey brand

Slingshot is a Kentucky style whiskey produced in Israel by Legends Distillery, founded by Noam Cohen and Alan Cohl. It was released in 2021.

== History ==
Previously, Cohen was a finance professional and Cohl an architect before changing careers to the manufacture of alcoholic spirits. Cohen and Cohl undertook stringent training in distilling techniques in order to be able to make it.

== Production ==
Despite being Israel's first "bourbon", given the legal requirements for bourbon they are not allowed to call themselves as such. The mash bill consists of around 60 percent corn, with wheat and barley making up the rest. Their methods of barrel treatment, as well as the climate in their particular region in Israel accelerates the maturation process.

The whiskey is aged for a minimum of three years in old white American oak barrels previously used by surrounding wineries for aging Cabernet, rather than in new white American oak barrels as is the required process in the US. The barrels are duly charred—double or even triple the level generally used in the US in whiskey production.

The name Slingshot pays homage to David's biblical triumph against Goliath. Legends Distillery is located near the Valley of Elah where David and Goliath's battle is said to have taken place.

Slingshot is sold in over 150 stores throughout Israel and online. Legends Distillery is open to tours.
