= Dynamo 5 =

Superhero team and comic series

- Dynamo 5 #1, showing the team with their father, the late Captain Dynamo in the upper right. Cover art by Mahmud A. Asrar and Ron Riley.

Publication information
- Publisher: Image Comics
- Schedule: Monthly
- Format: Ongoing series
- Publication date: March 2007 – December 2010
- No. of issues: 1-31
- Main characters: Smasher; Menagerie; Wraith; Supervision; Ramjet; Maddie Warner

Creative team
- Created by: Jay Faerber; Mahmud A. Asrar

Collected editions
- Post-Nuclear Family: ISBN 1-58240-859-9
- Moments of Truth: ISBN 1-58240-954-4
- Fresh Blood: ISBN 1-60706-131-7
- Change or Die: ISBN 1-60706-182-1
- Sins of the Father: ISBN 1-60706-369-7

Dynamo 5 is a comic book superhero team created by writer Jay Faerber and artist Mahmud A. Asrar, which appears in an eponymous series published by Image Comics. The team first appeared in Dynamo 5 #1 (Jan. 2007). The monthly series ended with issue #25 (Oct. 2009). The team later appeared in a 2010 miniseries, Dynamo 5: Sins of the Father, and the one-shot Dynamo 5 Holiday Special 2010 (Dec. 2010).

Dynamo 5 is a spin-off of Noble Causes, a previous comic book series created by Faerber set in the Image Universe, which also explores the dynamics of a superhero family.

== Publication history ==
Dynamo 5 is a spin-off of Noble Causes, another comic book series created by Faerber and published by Image Comics, which likewise explores the dynamics of a superhero family. Faerber created Dynamo 5 with the intent of making it more action-driven. The team is composed of five young men and women, each of whom inherited one of the five superhuman abilities of their father, the late superhero Captain Dynamo, and their mentor and leader, Dynamo's widow, Madeline "Maddie" Warner, who assembled the team following Dynamo's death.

Faerber explained that his inspiration for the series came from a conversation with editor Andy Helfer, in which he was asked what made the Teen Titans unique. When Faerber opined that the Titans were like a family, Helfer pointed out that all superhero teams could be described as such. From this, Faerber devised a team that was a biological family but did not act like it. Another influence, he said, was his parents' divorce.

Artist Asrar came at the suggestion of Invincible artist Ryan Ottley. Invincible writer Robert Kirkman, whose work on that title was influential on Faerber's writing, assisted Faerber during the development stage with advice on production and marketing. Asrar was the regular artist on the monthly series for its entire 25-issue run.

The team next appeared in the 2010 miniseries Dynamo 5: Sins of the Father, illustrated by Julio Brilha. It next starred in the one-shot Dynamo 5 Holiday Special 2010 (Dec. 2010).

The sequel miniseries featured crossover appearances by Invincible, Malcolm Dragon, and Angel Dragon, as well as the first group appearance of the Primaries, a government superhero team that included a clone of Captain Dynamo. Each issue also included a back-up story featuring Notorious, a costumed vigilante who in his civilian life poses as a member of the mob whose activities he foils in his costumed identity.

A US$1.00 reprint of the monthly series' first issue was published in May 2011 as part of Image Comics' "Image Firsts" line. A time-traveling Scrap is featured in 2023's Local Man: Gold by Tim Seeley and Tony Fleecs. Other members Slingshot and Myriad appear towards end in their first versions.

== Fictional team history ==
Dynamo 5 in action against The Veil. From Dynamo 5 #1 (January 2007). Art by Mahmud A. Asrar.

The focus of the series alternates back and forth between the private lives of each of the five team members, who maintain their separate lives in their home cities across North America, including their respective supporting casts, and their adventures as costumed superheroes.

Captain Dynamo was the much-beloved protector of Tower City for forty years following his exposure to an unidentified form of radiation that granted him superhuman abilities, and husband of Maddie Warner, a former agent of a government superhuman monitoring organization known as F.L.A.G., who used the cover of an award-winning investigative journalist, now retired. Dynamo is found dead, naked in a hotel bed, murdered by poison, though the details of his death are not released to the public. He was assassinated by Widowmaker, who was hired by unknown persons. Although Warner initially does not know this, she does suspect that the condition and setting in which his body was found was not natural, but arranged by whoever murdered him in order to further tarnish his image. In sorting through his personal effects, Warner discovers detailed information on countless incidents of infidelity on his part. Although devastated by the extent of her late husband's indiscretions, Warner is faced with the problem of Dynamo's numerous enemies, who will now take advantage of Tower City in his absence. Although other superheroes attempt to pitch in to keep the peace, Warner decides that Tower City needed a permanent protector.

Scouring through the information she gleaned from her husband's belongings, she locates five young people she believes could be his illegitimate children: Vancouver, British Columbia high school geek Hector Chang, Washington DC law student and activist Olivia "Livvie" Lewis, aimless ne'er do well and ladies' man Spencer Bridges, Hollywood, California theater employee and NYU Film School graduate Bridget Flynn, and Eastbridge, Texas high school football star Gage Reinhart. Gathering them together, Warner exposes them to the same radiation that Dynamo had been exposed to forty years earlier, unlocking their own latent superhuman abilities, with each one manifesting one of the five powers that their father possessed. Donning costumes, the five of them carry on his legacy as the superhero team the Dynamo 5, while coming to terms with learning about the father they never knew, and the four new half-siblings they each now have. Although the five are unaware that Warner is a former agent of F.L.A.G., she is determined to mold them not only into a team, but into a family as well, and functions as their mentor and "unofficial sixth member", calling the shots from the same headquarters once used by Captain Dynamo, and keeping in constant remote contact with them during their missions.

A year after Warner assembled the team, Warner and Jennifer Chang, the mother of Visionary, are taken hostage by the team's enemies, Widowmaker, Voltage, Bonechill, Brains and Brawn, at the Aquarium, the team's underwater headquarters. Widowmaker reveals to Warner that she killed Captain Dynamo. As Warner and Jennifer Chang are rescued by Dynamo 5, the Aquarium is flooded, Warner falls into a comatose state, and Myriad is revealed to be a half-extraterrestrial, with an alien physiognomy. These events led to the dissolution of the team. Although the Noble family drains and repairs the Aquarium, only Scrap decides to maintain her duties protecting Tower City, and eventually recruits other superheroes to replace her four siblings, and Augie Ford to replace Warner. Scatterbrain uses his telepathy to bring Warner out of her coma, during which he learns that she is a former F.L.A.G. agent. They assemble the rest of the team, and come to the rescue of Scrap and the replacement teammates, one of whom, Vigil, is revealed to be Myriad in disguise. The new team sustained serious injuries during their battle with Widowmaker and her team of mercenaries, but the villains were defeated by the combined forces of the heroes.

In a 2009 storyline in issues 24 and 25 of the series, the team was attacked by their other half-sibling, the supervillain Synergy, who used a weapon to erase the team's abilities and capture them. The team freed themselves, and used the weapon to restore their powers, but they manifested different abilities than those they previously had, and took on new code names.

In the 2010 miniseries Dynamo 5: Sins of the Father, the team faced off against the three sons of Dominex, a bellicose extraterrestrial who years earlier, had come to Earth to fight its most powerful champion, lest he destroy Earth. He left Earth after being narrowly defeated by Captain Dynamo, Supreme and Omni-Man, and his three sons now wished to regain their family's honor by similarly challenging Earth's heroes. The combined might of Dynamo 5, Invincible, Emily Reed (the younger of the mother-daughter duo the Firebirds), Malcolm Dragon, Angel Dragon, and the Primaries, a government superhero team that included a clone of Captain Dynamo secretly controlled by F.L.A.G. director Sandy Colvin, failed to defeat the three sons. After one of the sons critically impaled Emily Reed, her boyfriend, Dynamo 5 member Hector Chang, borrowed the Strong-Suit, a uniform that magnifies a wearer's strength created by the Winterbourne Institute, thus amplifying his already superhuman strength, allowing him to kill two of the sons. However, when he killed the third son, who had impaled Emily, even after that man had surrendered, he shocked bystanders and television viewers watching the battle and caused much consternation among his teammates. His relationship with Emily and her mother, who blamed Hector for Emily's injuries, was also threatened.

In the one-shot Dynamo 5 Holiday Special 2010, the team confronted Lumina, the daughter of escaped supervillain convict Luminex. The story also established that Gage Reinhart and the Primary member War Chest were involved in a romantic relationship, and featured four epilogues depicting the aftereffects of Sins of the Father pertaining to the Firebirds, Sandy Colvin, and the villains Synergy and Voltage.

== Cast ==
The five members of Dynamo 5 are brought together by Maddie Warner, who unlocks their powers. From Dynamo 5 #1. Art by Mahmud A. Asrar.

=== Team members ===
Hector Chang / Visionary / Smasher
Hector Chang was the first of Captain Dynamo's children contacted by Maddie Warner. An intellectually curious 15-year-old Vancouver, British Columbia high school geek with a history with bullies and guidance counselors, Hector, who is the youngest of the Dynamo 5 siblings, inherited his father's vision powers, which include laser vision, X-ray vision, and telescopic vision. Visionary's mother, Jennifer Chang, eventually discovers his double-life as a superhero, and forbids him from continuing it, though he does so anyway. He later switches powers with Bridget, becoming the superstrong and nigh-invulnerable hero Smasher.

Olivia Lewis / Slingshot / Menagerie
Olivia "Livvie" Lewis is the daughter of a high-priced Washington DC lawyer, and a junior at Georgetown University. The second oldest of the Dynamo 5 siblings, she is a driven activist involved with half a dozen different volunteer organizations. Livvie inherited her father's ability of flight. She is respectful towards Warner, whom she always addresses as "Ma'am", or "Mrs. Warner". Scrap sees Slingshot as the team's leader, to whom they look to for example, but Slingshot vehemently rejects this idea. She later gains Spencer's powers, becoming the shapechanging heroine Menagerie. While Spencer used his power to gain different human disguises, Olivia is able to change herself into different animals, exhibiting a fondness for aviarian creatures, bestowing on her a variation of her former flying powers.

Spencer Bridges / Myriad / Wraith
Spencer Bridges is the half-human, half-extraterrestrial child of Captain Dynamo and an alien woman conceived when Dynamo visited the alien woman's planet. Because of a taboo on raising half-breeds on her planet, his mother eventually brought the infant Spencer to Earth for Dynamo to raise, but Dynamo left Spencer in the custody of F.L.A.G. research facility, where his shapeshifting powers were unlocked. He bonded with a female researcher named Bridges, who eventually smuggled him out of the facility, and left him in the care of child services. Spencer led an unhappy life in a series of foster homes, and grew into a promiscuous womanizer who has never held a job for more than two weeks, though he never seems to be without financial means. He only agreed to join the team because Maddie is paying him. Spencer inherited his father's shapeshifting ability, and functions under the name Myriad. A loner who has grown up in various foster homes, Faerber has indicated that his shapeshifting ability will tie into his lack of direction in life, saying, "He inherited Cap's shape-shifting powers, and he can now become anyone he chooses. Maybe one day he'll figure out who he wants to be." Spencer has a cynical, distrustful view of life. He assumes that the deference and respect Slingshot pays to Warner is an attempt to "suck up". Having wondered his entire life who his father was, he is especially disappointed to learn it is Captain Dynamo, who he views as "an enormous hypocrite and a horrible husband." He keeps his half-extraterrestrial nature and appearance a secret from his siblings, but when they find out a year after the team is formed, it shakes their trust in him, and contributes to the temporary dissolution of the team. He later gains Gage's powers, losing his ability to shapeshift but gaining powerful telepathic powers, and takes the name Wraith. As a side-effect however he's stuck again in a superstrong, alien body, unable to blend with humanity.

Bridget Flynn / Scrap / Supervision
Bridget Flynn is a NYU Film School graduate, aspiring screenwriter and Hollywood, California theater employee when Maddie Warner first contacts her. She is in her early twenties, and is the oldest of her Dynamo 5 siblings. Bridget inherited her father's superhuman strength. A year after the team is formed, following Warner's descent into a coma, the flooding of the Aquarium, the team's headquarters, and the discovery that Scrap's brother and teammate Myriad is a half-extraterrestrial with an alien appearance, the team falls apart, but Scrap is the one member who remains in Tower City to protect it, and eventually recruits allies of the team to act as replacements for her siblings. She later switches powers with Hector, losing her enhanced physique but gaining his vision powers, formalizing her leadership under the new sobriquet of Supervision.

Gage Reinhart / Scatterbrain / Ramjet
Gage Reinhart is a 17-year-old Eastbridge, Texas high school football star who led his division in tackles for the entire season, and is the darling of both his female schoolmates and college scouts. Gage inherited his father's telepathy. Faerber has described Scatterbrain as "a popular, arrogant jock who never gave a damn about what anyone thought - until he can literally hear those thoughts. And he may not like what he hears." He and reformed criminal turned government agent War Chest enter into a romantic relationship by Dynamo 5 Holiday Special 2010. He later gains Livvie's powers, becoming the flying hero ace Ramjet, a human battering ram.

=== Supporting characters ===
Maddie Warner
Madeline "Maddie" Warner is the widow of Captain Dynamo and step mother to the Dynamo 5. She assembled his five children, and acts as their leader, mentor, and "unofficial sixth member", keeping in constant radio contact with them during missions from their headquarters. Although she must deal with the fact that they are constant reminders of her late husband's serial infidelity, she is insistent that they act not only as a team, but as a family as well. Despite her matronly role and demeanor with the team, she can be ruthless with enemies that she perceives to be threats, and will not hesitate to kill them. She is a former agent of the government superhuman-monitoring agency known as F.L.A.G., which she has not disclosed to the team, adding ominously in Dynamo 5 #1, "Kind of makes you wonder what else I never told them, doesn't it?" She maintains the cover of a retired reporter for a newspaper called The Journal.

Augie Ford
Augie Ford, who first appeared in Dynamo 5 #2, has been an agent of F.L.A.G. for 30 years, and is Warner's ex-partner. His current partner is Nicole Nakamura. Ford has long-harbored a romantic attraction to Warner, feelings which still linger. He first appears in Dynamo 5 #2, in which he pays her a visit to ask her if she is associated with this new team using her late husband's name, but she denies it. Because this visit occurs during a series of rampages by the villain Whiptail, he also tells her that F.L.A.G. is trying to reverse-engineer Whiptail's serum in order to track him by scent.

After Warner had been captured by Chrysalis and Synergy, and four members of Dynamo 5 had been captured by F.L.A.G., Augie encountered Slingshot at Warner's apartment, at which point he learned the truth of Warner's involvement with the team. Ford proposed to help Slingshot free her siblings by having her pose as a fellow F.L.A.G. agent when returning to F.L.A.G. headquarters, but when they encountered Ford's superior, Special Agent Sandy Colvin, Ford turned Slingshot in. In Dynamo 5 #7, He then knocked Colvin unconscious, and helped Slingshot free her siblings, later telling Colvin that the man who attacked him must have been a disguised Myriad. Ford has continued to aid the team when possible, as when he contacted the Noble Family after Dynamo 5 rescued Warner from a hostage situation, during which she had fallen into a comatose state. He served in Warner's place as the team's tactical eyes and ears until she came out of this state.

Quake
Quake (whose real name is Jacob) is a superhero in his early-to-mid twenties, slightly older than the members of Dynamo 5, who used to work with Captain Dynamo, whom he idolized. He possesses "raw, telekinetic powers" that manifest in the form of shockwaves and tremors. He has schizophrenia, which manifests itself in the form of delusions and hallucinations when he neglects to take his medication. Shortly after Captain Dynamo's death, Quake neglects to take his medication, which complicates his crime-fighting. Warner has Myriad practice impersonating Captain Dynamo, hoping to confront Quake and get through to him. Quake is one of the four superheroes that Scrap enlists to replace her siblings after Dynamo 5 dissolves after the team's first year of operation.

Noble Family
Like Dynamo 5, the Noble Family is a family of superheroes created by Jay Faerber, who star in their own monthly series. Two weeks after Warner began training Dynamo 5 to act as a team, the team begins to chafe under her strict demands, and insists that they are ready for their first mission. She sends them to Tower City, where they are soundly beaten by a quintet of villains: Dr. Chaos, Battle-Axe, Slipstream, Flashpoint and Iceberg. Dynamo 5 now realize that they are not ready, and continue to train. Unbeknownst to them, the villains are actually the Noble Family, a family of superheroes whom Warner had disguised as criminals in order to convince Dynamo 5 that they needed more training. The Nobles again came to Dynamo 5's aid after they rescued Warner from a hostage situation, during which he had fallen into a comatose state, by taking her to the Nobles' private island for examination.

F.L.A.G.
F.L.A.G. (Foundation for Law And Government) is a government organization that monitors and confronts superhuman activity. F.L.A.G. is headed in Washington, DC by a man named Director Lansing. F.L.A.G. had a close working relationship with Captain Dynamo. The organization has multiple headquarters in numerous cities, including a Tower City branch located in one of the city's skyscrapers. Shortly after Dynamo 5 began protecting Tower City, F.L.A.G. began investigating them, refusing to condone what one of its top agents, Sandy Colvin, considers to be vigilante activity. Although Warner's former partner, Augie Ford, is more sympathetic to the fact that the young members of Dynamo 5 are valiantly risking their lives to protect Tower City from threats that no one else is confronting, Colvin has F.L.A.G. capture the team (excluding Slingshot) and interrogates them. Ford helps Slingshot free her siblings, and conceals his complicity in this by conveying to Sandy that this was Myriad impersonating him.

F.L.A.G. conducts scientific experiments in a number of areas, including reverse engineering Bernard Dempsey's Whiptail serum, which turns a subject into a monstrous humanoid reptile, and duplicating the effect by which Captain Dynamo and Dynamo 5 gained their superhuman abilities, which thus far resulted in the deaths of F.L.A.G's test subjects. F.L.A.G. is apparently in possession of Captain Dynamo's corpse, on which they are conducting scientific research, though Ford does not know this.

Despite F.L.A.G.'s conflict with Dynamo 5, a number of its agents actually appreciate the effort Dynamo 5 makes in protecting Tower City.

Following Dynamo 5's defeat of Widowmaker, Slaughterhouse, Dr. Chimera, Firebreak and Optima, Scatterbrain telepathically learned the identity of the mysterious, tattooed man who had hired her, but by the time F.L.A.G. arrived at this man's office to arrest him, he had committed suicide, and although his face is still unrevealed, the tattoo on the back of his neck had disappeared, and is now sported by Augie Ford's superior, Sandy Colvin.

F.L.A.G. formed their own super team in order to confront Dynamo 5, consisting of Sergeant Flagstone, the Bald Eagle, War Chest, Soldier Ant and a clone of Captain Dynamo that is controlled through telemetry by Sandy Colvin, but when they first appeared as a team in the Sins of the Father miniseries, it was to join Dynamo 5 to battle the three sons of Dominex.

Firebirds
The Firebirds are Rebecca and Emily Reed, a mother-daughter superhero duo. Rebecca, the elder of the two, who is in her early thirties, was one of the superheroes who pitched in to protect Tower City following Captain Dynamo's death. Her daughter, Emily, is approximately 15–16 years old. Both have flight and pyrokinetic powers. There is some hostile tension between the elder Firebird and Maddie Warner, stemming from unrevealed aspects of their relationship. The Firebirds appeared in a self-titled 48-page one-shot book, Firebirds, that according to the ad at the end of Dynamo 5 #8, focuses on both the typical difficulties faced by a single mother raising a teenage daughter, and their superheroics. They came to the aid of Slingshot and Scrap during their encounter with the villain Bonechill, and were later enlisted by Scrap to replace her siblings following Dynamo 5's temporary dissolution. They are vulnerable to the pyrokinetic Firebreak, who can "steal" their fire, and Zero, who inflicted a life-threatening stomach wound to Rebecca during their time as members of Dynamo 5, but she managed to survive. Emily began a romantic relationship with Dynamo 5 member Hector Chang, but after she herself was impaled by a street sign in Dynamo 5: Sins of the Father #4, Rebecca blamed Hector for this, and had Emily's powers removed.

=== Adversaries ===
The Veil
A month after the team was formed, they confronted the Veil, a paramilitary terrorist organization that attacked Tower City with numerous soldiers, tanks, and powered armor suits. Although Dynamo 5 acquitted themselves well against the Veil, Visionary was captured by them and spirited away before the battle was over. He was brought to the Veil headquarters, and interrogated for information on the team by the Veil's leader, who calls himself The Superior. Injected with a serum to compel him to answer their questions, Visionary divulged everything about the team and how they were brought together by Warner. Before Visionary could answer the Superior's question about the nature of the radiation that gave them and their father their powers, Warner and the rest of Dynamo 5 arrived and captured The Superior and his lieutenant. Ordering Dynamo 5 back to headquarters, Warner revealed that she was a former agent of F.L.A.G. and killed both the Superior and his lieutenant with gunshots to the head. Approximately a year later, a Veil cell composed of corrupt F.L.A.G. agents is defeated by Dynamo 5.

Whiptail
Bernard Dempsey used to transform himself into a large humanoid lizard through the use of a serum he developed, and was a formidable enemy of Captain Dynamo. He was eventually diagnosed with Alzheimer's disease, and was relegated to the Evergreen Nursing Home for five years. In Dynamo 5 #2, the team learns that Whiptail is again going on rampages in Tower City, but concludes that this new Whiptail was someone else using the serum. Warner is paid a visit by her old partner, Augie Ford, who tells her that F.L.A.G. is attempting to reverse-engineer Dempsey's serum in order to track Whiptail's scent. During a stakeout one night, the team confronts this new Whiptail, and after knocking the creature unconscious, it reverts to its human form, that of Nicole Nakamura, Augie's current partner. The team escapes before the arrival of the authorities, including Ford, who confiscates the stash of serum found on the rogue agent. He gives the stash to a female agent named Johnson, who is really Myriad in disguise, and gives Warner one of the vials. Warner later injects the serum into herself and transforms into Whiptail in order to escape Chrysalis and Synergy, who had captured her and threatened to murder her. She later returns to human form after being rendered unconscious by Scrap.

Chrysalis
Chrysalis is a female supervillain who wears a suit of powered armor, and who was Captain Dynamo's archenemy for at least twenty years. Despite this, she was also his lover, and mothered another illegitimate child of his, a daughter named Cynthia who goes by the name Synergy. Chrysalis and Synergy enacted a plan whereby Synergy would pose as the apparently resurrected Captain Dynamo to draw out Warner, even stealing Captain Dynamo's corpse from his grave to complete the appearance that he had returned from the dead. They were defeated.

Synergy
Synergy (real name Cynthia), like the members of Dynamo 5, is an illegitimate child of Captain Dynamo. Her mother is Dynamo's former archenemy, Chrysalis. Dynamo was present at Synergy's birth, and even helped raise his daughter during her youth. Synergy has all five of Captain Dynamo's powers, having been exposed by her mother as a young girl to the same radiation that gave Captain Dynamo his powers. Synergy used her shapeshifting ability to pose as Captain Dynamo in order to draw out Warner and capture her. Before she can kill Warner on her mother's orders, however, Warner manages to escape by injecting herself with the Whiptail serum and transforming into Whiptail. After Warner is cured, and Synergy subdued, Warner, feeling that Synergy was not evil, but had been misguided by her mother, has Scatterbrain wipe Synergy's memories to give her complete amnesia, and leaves her in the care of a church orphanage. Her memories are apparently restored by a priest named Father Gideon, after which she vows revenge on Dynamo 5. After it is revealed that Father Gideon is Maddie Warner's son, Michael, who used Synergy in a scheme to get revenge on Warner for abandoning him as a child, Synergy abandons Gideon.

Voltage
Voltage is a supervillain with the power to project powerful bolts of electricity from his body. He can feed off the electricity of sources like power stations in order to become stronger. In Dynamo 5's first encounter with him, is defeated by a telepathic attack from Scatterbrain. This event was inadvertently triggered when Voltage electrocuted him, and was the first time Scatterbrain discovered that his telepathy could be used as an offensive weapon. Voltage joins a crew assembled by Widowmaker that take Maddie Warner and Visionary's mother hostage, but which are defeated by Dynamo 5. He was later attacked by a human and two Khandrians (the extraterrestrial race to which Dynamo 5 member Spencer Bridges' mother belonged), who informed him that their research indicated that he was the biological son of Captain Dynamo, and who then stabbed him, possibly fatally.

Bonechill
Bonechill is Kenneth Yaeger, a skull-faced villain caught in a cryogenic accident that gave him the ability to project intense cold. With this ability, he can create shaped objects of ice and snow, such as walls and jagged ice daggers on his gauntlets, and completely cover large areas, like the roof of a building, with ice and snow to hinder his opponent's mobility. Although he had never been encountered by Captain Dynamo, Scrap and Slingshot confronted him after investigating the deaths of Yaeger's former criminal associates, whom Bonechill killed for betraying him to the authorities after they were captured following a bank robbery. Scrap and Slingshot defeated Bonechill with the help of the Firebirds, a mother and daughter superhero duo. Bonechill was imprisoned at Tartarus, a floating federal penitentiary. He was then contacted by Voltage, and after freeing him, the two of them teamed up with the villainous duo Brains and Brawn. They are assembled by Widowmaker, and take Maddie Warner and Visionary's mother hostage, but are defeated by Dynamo 5.

Brains and Brawn
Brains and Brawn are a supervillain duo. Brains is a high-level telepath, and Brawn possesses immense superhuman strength and invulnerability. They fought Captain Dynamo a few times before leaving their native Tower City. After the Noble family foiled a Crowne Pointe bank robbery by the two, wounding Brains in the process, the duo fled to Tower City, where Brawn is confronted by Scrap and Slingshot. During this, a comatose Scatterbrain discovers he can project his astral self, and is attacked by Brains, who is also in the astral plane. After he bests her, both of them regain consciousness. Brains and Brawn flee, and are later contacted by Dynamo 5's other adversaries, Voltage and Bonechill. All four assembled by Widowmaker, and take Maddie Warner and Visionary's mother hostage, but are defeated by Dynamo 5.

Lionel Barstow
Lionel Bartsow is an assassin employed by high-end clients such as CEOs and heads of state, with a "death touch" that allows him to kill anyone with whose bare skin he comes into physical contact. After being captured by the authorities, his attorney, Neil Lewis (the father of Olivia Lewis, aka Slingshot), advised him to testify against his former employers. His employers then kidnap Neil Lewis, blackmailing Slingshot into freeing Barstow. After Dynamo 5, who are not acquainted with Barstow's powers or his relationship to Neil's kidnappers, free Barstow, he kills his ex-employers, and reveals the truth to his rescuers. Although Livvie's siblings are outraged at learning that they freed a murderer, Livvie is more concerned with getting her father to safety than returning Barstow to the authorities, a decision that serves as a source of tension among the team. Livvie later finds Barstow and returns him to the authorities, despite his threat to use her secret identity as a bargaining chip with them.

Widowmaker
Widowmaker is the assassin who killed Captain Dynamo. She was subsequently hired to take down Dynamo 5. Aware that she could not take on the whole team by herself, she enlists Voltage, Bonechill, Brains and Brawn to assist her. The villains take Maddie Warner and Visionary's mother hostage. They are defeated by Dynamo 5, but before escaping, Widowmaker vows to complete the contract someday. Widowmaker is a skilled martial artist who does not appear to have any superpowers. She later assembles another crew of mercenaries to attack Dynamo 5, but is again defeated, and the identity of her employer is telepathically gleaned by Scatterbrain.

== Equipment ==
Dynamo 5 uses a number of highly sophisticated devices. The individual members of the team wear special watches that act as communication devices, allowing Warner to alert and assemble the team in an emergency, and keep in constant contact with them during such situations. The watches also possess a function that can instantly transform the civilian clothing worn by the team members into their Dynamo 5 uniforms.

The team is headquartered at the Aquarium, a high-tech lair underneath an industrial pier that was formerly used by Captain Dynamo. The Aquarium's resources include equipment with which Warner can monitor the police radio for watch words that trigger an alert to the team of a possible emergency, and with which she can summon, monitor, and communicate with members of the team during engagements with hostile forces. The team also utilizes a teleportation device called the Jump Station, which allows them to travel instantly across the continent to meet with one another. The team can activate the Jump Station by manipulating a device on their costumes. The Jump Station can only transport persons from the station itself to another location and back, but not effect transportation directly between two other locations. The Aquarium also features a training simulator room that can present a number of threats to the team, and be programmed for a number of difficulty levels, which the team refers to as the Shark Tank, as well as an office used by Warner. One year into the team's existence, the Aquarium was flooded during the team's rescue of Warner and Jennifer Chang from a hostage situation, but was later drained and sealed by the team's ally, Doc Noble, after which it resumed function as team headquarters.

== Collected editions ==
| Title | ISBN | Release date | Collected material |
|---|---|---|---|
| Dynamo 5 Vol. 1: Post-Nuclear Family | SC: ISBN 978-1-58240-859-0 | 10/10/2007 | Dynamo 5 #1–7 |
| Dynamo 5 Vol. 2: Moments of Truth | SC: ISBN 978-1-58240-954-2 | 6/18/2008 | Dynamo 5 #8–13 |
| Dynamo 5 Vol. 3: Fresh Blood | SC: ISBN 978-1-60706-131-1 | 7/29/2009 | Dynamo 5 #14–19 |
| Dynamo 5 Vol. 4: Change or Die | SC: ISBN 978-1-60706-182-3 | 5/11/2010 | Dynamo 5 #20–25, #0 |
| Dynamo 5 Vol. 5: Sins of the Father | SC: ISBN 978-1-60706-369-8 | 5/24/2011 | Dynamo 5: Sins of the Father #1–5, Dynamo 5 Holiday Special 2010 |

== See also ==
- The Illegitimates, a comic about the illegitimate children of a Bond-style secret agent.
