= Slingshot (comics) =

Slingshot, in comics, may refer to:

- Slingshot, an alias used by the Image Comics character Menagerie (Image Comics)
- Slingshot, the alias of Marvel Comics character Yo-Yo Rodriguez
- Slingshot, the alter ego of Silk Spectre (Laurie Juspeczyk), a Watchmen character
- Slingshot (Transformers), a Transformer who has appeared in comic book adaptations of the toys
- Slingshot (DC Comics), two DC Comics characters

== See also ==
- Slingshot (disambiguation)
