= Noble Causes =

Comic book series by Jay Faerber

- Cover of Noble Causes vol. 2, 3 (Sept, 2004), art by Tyler Kirkham

Publication information
- Publisher: Image Comics
- Format: Varied
- Genre: Superhero
- Publication date: January 2002 – April 2008
- No. of issues: 40
- Main character: Full list

Creative team
- Created by: Jay Faerber
- Written by: Jay Faerber; J. Torres, Brian K. Vaughan, John Layman, Dan Abnett, Andy Lanning, Gail Simone
- Artist(s): (covers) Fran Bueno, Todd Nauck, Tyler Kirkman, Rodolfo Migliari, Andres Ponce, Ron Riley, Gabe Bridwell, Jack Lawrence, Yıldıray Çınar
- Penciller(s): Fran Bueno, Ron Riley, Jon Bosco, Yıldıray Çınar
- Inker: Fran Bueno

Collected editions
- In Sickness and in Health: ISBN 1-58240-293-0
- Family Secrets: ISBN 1-58240-348-1
- Distant Relatives: ISBN 1-58240-481-X
- Blood and Water: ISBN 1-58240-536-0
- Betrayals: ISBN 1-58240-578-6
- Hidden Agendas: ISBN 1-58240-706-1
- Powerless: ISBN 1-58240-848-3
- Star Crossed: ISBN 1-60706-038-8
- Five Years Later: ISBN 1-60706-162-7
- Ever After: ISBN 1-60706-297-6

Noble Causes is an American comic book series created and written by Jay Faerber, illustrated by a variety of artists and published by Image Comics. It was launched in 2002.

The series follows the lives of the Nobles, a wealthy superhero family in the Image Universe. The stories focus less on the Nobles fighting supervillains and more on their personal lives. Originally intended to be an ongoing title, it was downgraded into a series of miniseries and one-shots. It finally became an ongoing title in 2004.

Beginning with issue #32, the series jumped five years after the previous storyline. At this point, the characters Gaia, Race and Liz are no longer active part in the family, while Doc's new wife, Olympia, and her two children joined the Noble family.

The series concluded in 2008 with the publication of issue #40.

== Characters ==
=== The Nobles ===
- Dr. Dudley "Doc" Noble: Patriarch of the Noble family. A two-fisted scientist seemingly more at ease with machines than with other people, Doc will nevertheless go to any lengths he deems necessary to defend his family. He has access to a vast supply of advanced weaponry and equipment, which he can access with simple verbal commands. Doc was initially married to Gaia, but divorced her after discovering her involvement in a monster that terrorized the city. He later married Olympia, but experienced difficulties when he discovered that he still had feelings for Gaia. Olympia left Doc with an ultimatum of choosing either her or Gaia. The series ends with Doc making a phone call to an unknown woman telling her that she is the one he "wants to be with".
- Gaia Noble: The family matriarch. A sorceress from another dimension who can command the four classical elements, Gaia is also incredibly media savvy and is responsible for positioning the Noble family into the public spotlight. She is extremely concerned with how things look to the public and goes to great lengths to ensure that the family's image remains intact. When the Blackthornes begins to gain more attention than the Noble family, Gaia unleashes a monster for her family to fight and once again gain the public spotlight. This backfires when Liz regains her memories, which include seeing Gaia give the monster instructions. As a result, Gaia and Doc divorce and Gaia spends multiple years in jail. Upon her release, Gaia informs Doc that she intended to win back his heart.
- Russell "Rusty" Noble: Rusty is Doc and Gaia's first-born child. Rusty's brain was placed in a robotic body following a battle with a robotic assassin that would have otherwise killed him. Rusty dislikes being in the public spotlight, which contributed to his eventual divorce with Celeste. He later dates Cosmic Rae, a young woman with magnetic abilities who is secretly an android. Upon discovering this, Rusty tries to find the "real Rae". His mission leads him to a robotics genius who was a federal witness. The ensuing battle ends with a number of police officers being injured and the deaths of a news helicopter crew. Rusty spends some time in jail and was eventually freed, where he resumes working with the current roster of Nobles. Five years in the future, it is shown that Rusty has become a seemingly emotionless being, only showing emotion when Frost is injured and when the widow of the man he killed attempts revenge.
- Frost: Gaia's son from an extramarital affair and the black sheep of the family. Aside from Gaia, each member of the family treats him with varying degrees of scorn. To the general public, Frost is something of an urban legend. He lives in seclusion in a large ice castle near the Aurora Borealis. Frost has the power of cold manipulation as well as the ability to transform into a cool mist, and always has an agenda when it comes to the Nobles (except for Gaia, to whom he is extremely loyal). He even went so far as to have an affair with Celeste while she was married to Rusty. It is later revealed that Frost's father was a parallel universe version of Doc.
- Race Noble: Doc and Gaia's second-born son. Smart, handsome and charming, Race possesses superhuman speed and is considered the "golden boy" of the family. In the original miniseries, Race was killed while on his honeymoon. At the end of Noble Causes: Distant Relatives #4, he is returned to life. Now, he is the target of a revenge plot formulated by the Blackthornes, the Nobles' criminal counterparts. Years ago, during a fight between the two families, Race was battling Pierce Blackthorne when a misstep caused Pierce to fall to his death. Race failed to save Pierce and therefore was blamed by Hunter Blackthorne. The event haunts Race to this day. An attack by the super-powered assassin Widowmaker has robbed him of his super-speed abilities.
- Elizabeth "Liz" Donnelly-Noble: Race's wife and the only normal member of the family. An ordinary Georgetown bookseller, she met Race when he disrupted a signing at her bookstore. Possessing no super-powers or exotic background, Liz is the proverbial stranger in a strange land. Her only special gifts are common sense and a willingness to speak her mind. Liz was the assumed target of the Blackthorne family's revenge plot. A mishap occurred in the experiment intended to restore Race's powers, causing her to be hit with a tachyon stream and vanish. Liz awakens in the present with amnesia, unable to remember the Nobles.
- Zephyr Noble: Doc and Gaia's only daughter, and their youngest child. She has the power of air manipulation, and can be considered the wild child of the family, having once made a sex tape which was subsequently released on the internet. She later reveals to Liz that this tape was filmed while an innocent girl was being held at gunpoint. Following this incident, Zephyr begins a pattern of self-destructive behavior which culminates in her becoming pregnant as the result of an agreement with her family's nemesis Draconis. Her baby was believed to be stillborn; in reality, her doctor was paid by Necrona Blackthorne to help kidnap the baby. In issue #32, Zephyr wins Slate's affection, eventually marrying him.
- Celeste Noble: Rusty's ex-wife, a publicity-hungry diva who possesses stellar energy-based powers. She received her powers from a think tank known as the Winterbourne Institute. Celeste attracted Rusty's attention by staging fights with supervillains she hired. Celeste seems to have married into the family more for the status than for love. Celeste, much to her own surprise, genuinely falls in love with Dawn Blackthorne. Her relationship with Dawn ends after Celeste kills Kitty, Dawn's mother, out of pity, believing her condition could not be cured.
- Olympia Noble: Doc's second wife. Appeared in issue #32 as the second wife of Doc, she is superhumanly strong and beautiful, with an outgoing personality.
- Minutiae: Olympia's geeky daughter. She can alter her own mass and size, shrinking to subatomic level. She shares the same interest in science as Doc, helping him with his inventions.
- Surge: Olympia's son. He is the classical "angry young man" who would disagree with Doc if Doc told him rain was wet, a hothead with energy-based powers.
- Slate Blackthorne: The youngest of the Blackthorne family. Able to transform into a super-strong rock-like form with incredible resistance to harm, Slate has no real desire to follow in his family's footsteps, so he secretly performs good deeds. He is Zephyr's next door neighbor. Initially, both were unaware of each other's alter-ego. As of issue #32, they married.

=== The Blackthornes ===
- Hunter Blackthorne: A dark sorcerer and the patriarch of the Blackthorne family. After being released on parole, Hunter is plotting an elaborate revenge scheme against Race, whom he blames for the death of his son Pierce. That plan resulted in Race losing his super-speed and the public now viewing the Blackthornes as being reformed. After Kitty's death, he accepted Race's offer to reunite him with her and Pierce in an alternate reality.
- Katherine "Kitty" Blackthorne: The matriarch of the Blackthorne family. In order to bolster her natural feral abilities, she drank a special elixir of Hunter's creation. If she took too much, she would mutate into a savage cat-like beast. Unfortunately, she developed an addiction to it. In her beast form, she terrorized the streets of Crowns Pointe at night. Eventually, the elixir became part of her system and she began transforming without it. A cure was created, but too late as, after a rampage, she begs Celeste to kill her. Celeste obliges, decapitating Kitty with a stellar energy blast.
- Mercury Blackthorne: The oldest of the Blackthorne children. After Pierce, Mercury's younger brother, died, he became mute. Mercury can alter his body's density from diamond-hard to intangible.
- Necrona Blackthorne: Krennick's long-lost half-sister, current ruler of the Underworld and secretly Mercury's wife. Draconis had often ordered any daughters he had sired to be immediately put to death. In response, Necrona's mother spirited her away to a distant part of the Underworld. Like many of her people, Necrona possesses superhuman strength and durability, in addition to the ability to project fire.
- Dusk and Dawn Blackthorne: Twins who can manipulate darkness and light respectively. Dusk resents Dawn, who, in her eyes, is the family favorite. She has also shown rather impulsive behavior. Dawn, on the other hand, values her family and her love life and keeps them very close to the vest. She works hard to keep her family together although she sometimes struggles to protect her secret lesbian relationship with Celeste Noble, which has since ended due to Celeste's killing of Kitty.

=== Supporting cast ===
- Krennick: Son of Draconis, ruler of the Underworld, a subterranean realm. Once an enemy of the Nobles alongside his father, he and Race became friends after both men were trapped in an alternate dimension for a year. Krennick became a surrogate member of the Noble family. Infatuated with Zephyr, he had a casual relationship with her doppelgänger Gretchen Lewis, calling her by Zephyr's name and having her wear a red-haired wig, before her murder by one of Krennick's generals. The revelation of Krennick's predilections has strained his friendships with both Zephyr and Race. After the discovery of the true murderer, Krennick turned rulership of the Underworld over to his newfound sister Necrona. Like many of his people, Krennick possesses superhuman strength and durability, in addition to the ability to project fire from his hands.
- Clarion: Gaia's friend and confidant. Seen in a number of back-up stories, it was Clarion who raised Frost alongside her own son. Very little is known about Clarion, including whatever powers she may possess. It is possible that she may hail from the same dimension as Gaia.
- Cosmic Rae: An African-American superheroine, Rusty begins dating soon after his divorce from Celeste. Rae can control magnetism, including manipulating metals which are susceptible to that force. While on a mission in space, it is discovered by Frost that Rae is actually a robot. Frost keeps her secret in exchange for her doing him a favor in the future. Rusty recently assaulted Rae upon discovering this, ripping one of her arms off in the process. Doc secretly revealed to Gaia that he created Rae so that Rusty could have someone to love.
- Detective Ryan O'Mega: A detective in the superhuman crimes division of the Crown Pointe police department. O'Mega has various forms of superhuman vision, but requires special glasses to control them. After investigating the murder of Gretchen Lewis, he briefly became romantically involved with Zephyr.

== Collected editions ==
The various releases are collected into a number of trade paperbacks.

=== Vol. 1: In Sickness and in Health ===
Race introduces Liz to the family for dinner. After a huge skirmish, Liz retreats to the bathroom, shaken by what she witnessed. Some time later, Race and Liz' wedding comes. Soon after, while on their honeymoon, Race is killed by a laser beam from the sky. Meanwhile, Zephyr discovers she's pregnant and Rusty discovers Celeste and Frost's affair when he catches them together in the shower. It is revealed that Icarus, the family's loyal robot servant, had murdered Race and severely injured Rusty, in order to reshape the family into what he thought Doc wanted it to be.

Volume collects Noble Causes 4-issue mini-series and Noble Causes: First Impressions.

=== Vol. 2: Family Secrets ===
Picking up the pieces after their ordeal at the hands of Icarus, the Nobles are again rocked by scandal when Zephyr's pregnancy becomes public. Meanwhile, Rusty throws Celeste out of their home for sleeping with Frost. Frost uses information he has concerning Zephyr's baby as leverage for Gaia to reveal who his father is. Rusty goes through a number of superheroes he believes to be the father of Zephyr's baby. The father is revealed to be Draconis, whom Doc kills at the end of the story. Celeste serves Rusty with divorce papers and Gaia finally tells Frost who his father is.

Volume collects Noble Causes: Family Secrets 4-issue mini-series.

=== Vol. 3: Distant Relatives ===
Frost goes off on a search for his true father, who turns out to be an alternate-reality version of Doc. In that reality, the Nobles are fugitives from the law. Meanwhile, Rusty, hurting after his divorce, finds love again when he meets Cosmic Rae. Liz has followed Frost on his search, looking for an alternate version of Race, who turns out to be rather amoral. After the death of his father, Krennick has become ruler of the Underworld, quite reluctantly. When Zephyr discovers that Krennick hires prostitutes to impersonate her, she becomes disgusted and tells Krennick to stay away from her. When Frost meets up with Liz, he decides to send her to another alternate reality — one where Race is alive but her own counterpart is dead.

Volume collects Noble Causes: Distant Relatives 4-issue mini-series.

=== Vol. 4: Blood & Water ===
A prostitute named Gretchen Lewis is discovered lying dead in an alley, dressed as Zephyr. Det. Omega is heading the investigation and Krennick is the prime suspect. Meanwhile, Rusty and Cosmic Rae embark on a government-sponsored mission to rescue a team of scientists from another planet. Unfortunately, Celeste and Frost are part of the mission as well. Gretchen's killer turns out to be Diakun, Krennick's advisor. Doc goes to visit Steven Dockerty, a man so obsessed with Gaia that he once tried to assassinate the president of the United States in order to impress her. He returns a different man.

Volume collects issues #1-6.

=== Vol. 5: Betrayals ===
Rusty, Celeste, Frost, Rae and the other heroes are still stranded on the alien world, which is later revealed to be the dimension Gaia hails from. Steven Dockerty escapes from the mental institution where he was being kept and heads straight for Noble Manor. But things are not as they appear. As it turns out, Dockerty switched bodies with Doc with the cooperation of a warlock. When the entire family arrives in Gaia's home dimension, the spell is reversed and the heroes return home. As a consolation, Gaia's father, the ruler of the dimension, is given Dockerty as a prisoner. Zephyr finally gives birth to her baby. Unfortunately, what should be a time of great joy becomes a tragedy when the baby is stillborn...or so the Nobles are led to believe.

Volume collects issues #7-12, plus The Pact volume 2 #2.

=== Vol. 6: Hidden Agendas ===
Hunter Blackthorne has just made parole, much to the chagrin of the Nobles, particularly Doc and Race. Once he is home, he and the family set an insidious revenge plot in motion. Their target: Liz Noble. Zephyr attempts to live a normal life, following the apparent death of her baby. Meanwhile, Celeste is involved in a secret affair with Dawn Blackthorne.

Volume collects issues #13-18 plus Frost short story "Snow Job" from Image Holiday Special 2005.

=== Vol. 7: Powerless ===
Volume collects issues #19-25.

=== Vol. 8: Star Crossed ===
The lives of the Nobles and the Blackthornes continue to intertwine as Zephyr Noble and Slate Blackthorne enter into a secret affair, and the terminally ill Kitty Blackthorne makes an unthinkable request of Celeste.

Volume 8 collects issues #26-31.

=== Vol. 9: Five Years Later ===
Jumping five years after the events of the previous story, Doc Noble has rededicated the Noble family to be the world's preeminent superheroes, but even as they take a more pro-active approach to fighting crime on a global scale, they still harbor dark secrets and hidden agendas.

Volume 9 collects issues #32-36.

=== Vol. 10: Ever After ===
Long-kept secrets are revealed in the final volume of the Noble Causes saga as Image Comics' most dysfunctional superhero family returns for their last collection of adventures.

Volume 10 collects issues #37-40.

=== Noble Causes: Extended Family ===
Two-issue series.

=== Noble Causes Archives Vol. 1 ===
Collects volumes 1 through 5 (black & white)

=== Noble Causes Archives Vol. 2 ===
Collects volumes 6 through 10 and Noble Causes: Extended Family (black & white)

== Reading order ==
- Noble Causes Vol 1: In Sickness and in Health
- Noble Causes Vol 2: Family Secrets
- Noble Causes Extended Family 1
- Noble Causes Vol 3: Distant Relatives
- Noble Causes Extended Family 2
- Noble Causes Vol 4: Blood & Water
- Noble Causes Vol 5: Betrayals
- Noble Causes Vol 6: Hidden Agendas
- Noble Causes Vol 7: Powerless
- Noble Causes Vol 8: Star Crossed
- Noble Causes Vol 9: Five Years Later
- Noble Causes Vol 10: Ever After

== Other appearances ==
- Doc and Gaia Noble attend the funeral of the Guardians of the Globe in Invincible #8.
- The Nobles make a cameo appearance at Captain Dynamo's funeral in Dynamo 5 #1.
- The Nobles also make a more eventful appearance in Dynamo 5 #13 when Augie Ford of F.L.A.G. calls the Nobles to aid the Dynamo 5's mentor Maddie Warner, after she has fallen into a coma. He again appears in Dynamo 5 #17 when she is brought out of her coma.
- Zephyr Noble appears in the second volume of The Pact, a book about a team of superhero teens of which she is a member.
- A Noble Causes short story titled "Family Gathering" is included in Image! 30th Anniversary Anthology #7.
