= Mahmud Asrar =

Turkish and Austrian comic book artist

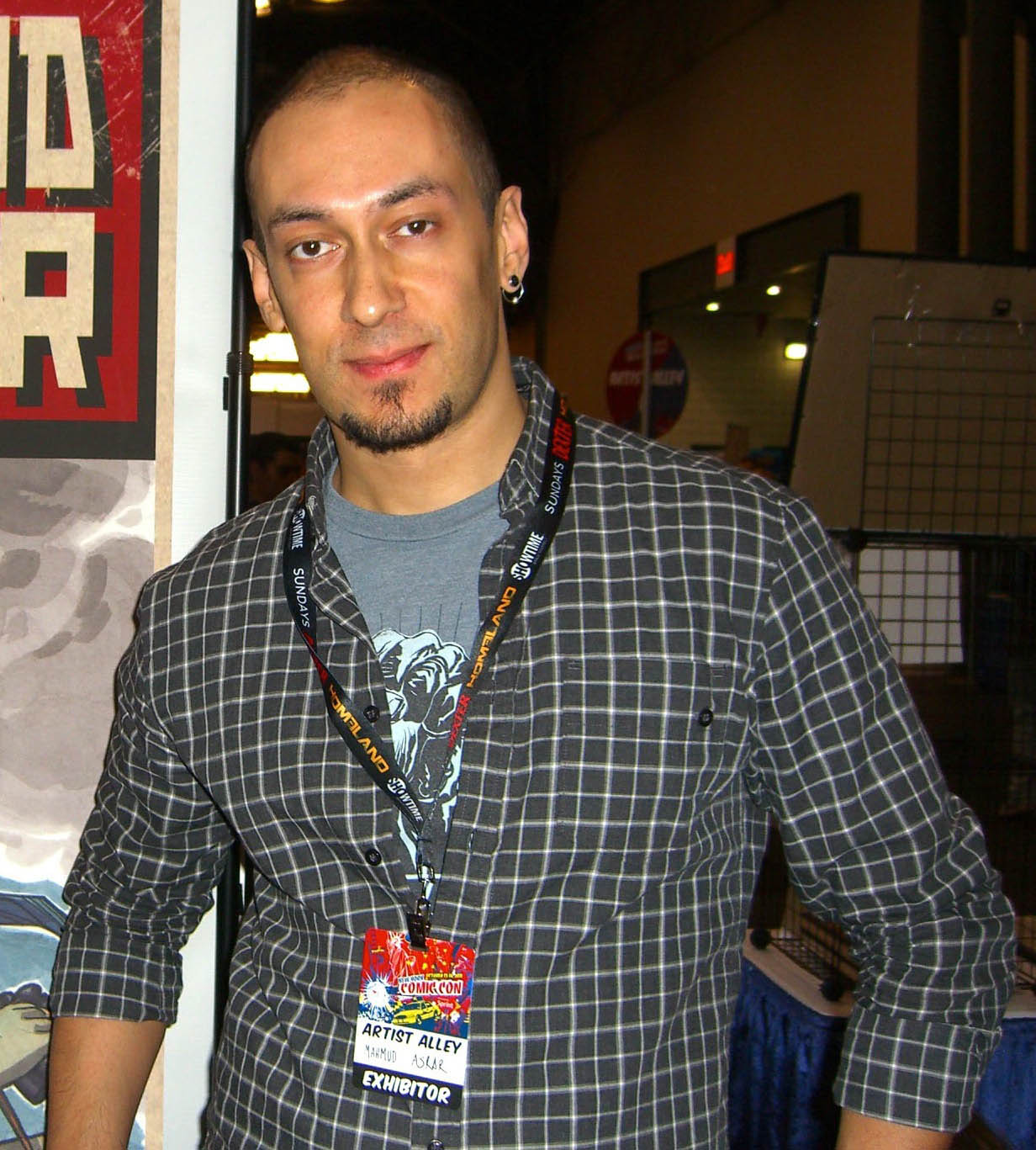
- Asrar at the New York Comic Con in Manhattan, October 16, 2011
- Born: November 20, 1976 (age 50) Ankara, Turkey
- Areas: Penciller, Inker
- Notable works: Dynamo 5; Supergirl; X-Men Red; Conan The Barbarian; King Conan; Batman vs Robin

Mahmud Anjum Asrar (born November 20, 1976) is a Turkish and Austrian comic book artist who is known for his work on American and non-American comic books.

His American work includes runs on Conan the Barbarian, King Conan, X-Men, X-Men Red, Wolverine & the X-Men, All-New All-Different Avengers and others for Marvel Comics, Supergirl and Batman vs Robin for DC Comics, and for co-creating, with writer Jay Faerber, the series Dynamo 5, which debuted in March 2007 from Image Comics.

== Early life ==
Asrar was born in Ankara, Turkey to an Austrian mother and a Pakistani father. He expressed an interest in art and comic books at an early age.

He attended Hacettepe University from 1994 to 1996, majoring in fine arts and graphics, and Anatolian University from 1996 to 2000, majoring in the same.

== Career ==
Asrar came to the attention of writer Jay Faerber through his work on the independent anthology Digital Webbing Presents, and through a recommendation by Invincible artist Ryan Ottley, which led to his work on the Image Comics monthly series Dynamo 5, which Faerber and Asrar co-created, and on which Asrar was the regular artist. Asrar's other Image Comics work includes Small Gods.

Asrar also pencilled She-Hulk: Cosmic Collision, a one-shot written by Peter David, that was published in December 2008, by Marvel Comics. He was the artist on the Brightest Day: Atom oneshot written by Jeff Lemire that leads into an Atom co-feature in Adventure Comics, and is currently the artist of Supergirl in the rebooted DC Universe. Starting in March 2013, Asrar was the lead artist on Ultimate Comics: X-Men.

== Bibliography ==
=== DC ===
- Adventure Comics (Atom) #516-521 (2010–11)
- Atom (Ray Palmer) Giant-Size #1 (2011)
- Brightest Day: The Atom Special #1 (2011)
- Justice League of America, vol. 4, 80-Page Giant #1 (among other artists, 2009)
- Supergirl, vol. 6, #0-7, 9-12, 14-17, 19-20 (2011–13)
- Batman vs Robin #1-5 (2022-2023)

=== Image ===
- Dynamo 5 #0-25 (2007–09)
- Invincible #20 (2005)
- Savage Dragon #124 (along with Erik Larsen) (2006)
- Small Gods: Outside The Box, miniseries, #1-4 (2004)

=== Marvel ===
- All-New X-Men #20, #31-36, #40-41 (2014-2015)
- Avengers: The Initiative #32 (2010)
- Nova, vol. 3, #34-35 (full art); Annual #1 (among other artists) (2008–10)
- Realm of Kings, miniseries, #1 (2010)
- She-Hulk: Cosmic Collision (2009)
- Young Avengers: Siege (2010)
- Thunderbolts #137 (2009)
- X-Men #24-25 (2013)
- War of Kings: Warriors, miniseries, #1 (2009)
- War Machine, vol. 3, #6-7 (2009)
- Wolverine and the X-Men, vol. 2, #1-6 (2014)
- X-Men Red (2018)
- Uncanny X-Men (2018-2019)

=== Other publishers ===
- Alacakaranlik #2 (2006)
- Cyberage Adventures #2: "Jade Tiger" (2005, IHero Entertainment)
- Digital Webbing Presents #20, 25-26 (Digital Webbing Press, 2004–05)
- Dylan Dog #9 (Rodeo Kitap, 2004)
- Nothingface, graphic novel (Digital Webbing Press, 2004)
- Resimli Roman #2-3 (2005)
- Rodeo Strip #1-6, 11 (Rodeo Kitap, 2004–06)
- Star Wars: Jedi The Dark Side, miniseries #1-5 (2011)
- Seruven #6 (2005)
- Warmageddon Quarterly #2-3 (2006, L Jamal Inc)
