= Jay Faerber =

American novelist

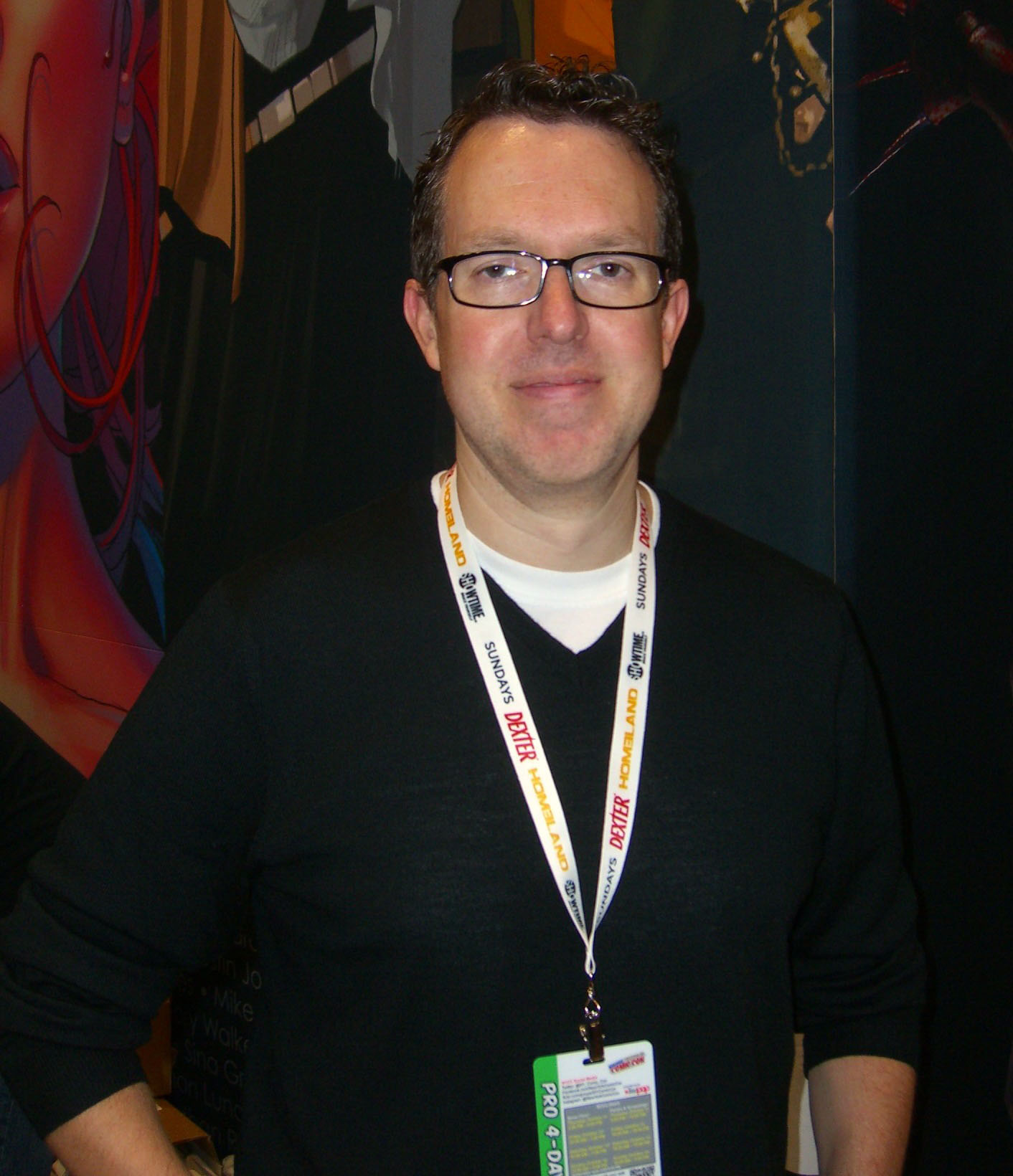
- Faerber at the 2012 New York Comic Con.
- Born: 1972 (age 53–54)
- Area: Writer
- Notable works: Noble Causes; Dynamo 5

Jay Faerber (/ˈfɜːrbər/; born 1972) is an American comic book and television writer. Faerber is known for his work on Generation X and New Warriors for Marvel Comics, and The Titans and Connor: Spotlight for DC Comics. He later wrote his own creator-owned titles for Image Comics, including Noble Causes, Dynamo 5, Near Death and Copperhead. He was also a writer on the television series Ringer, Star-Crossed, Zoo, and Supergirl.

== Early life and influences ==
Faerber grew up in northeastern Pennsylvania, and spent a considerable amount of his childhood in the Seattle area. His early interest in superheroes was sparked by TV series such as Spider-Man and His Amazing Friends, the Adam West Batman series and the 1960s The Superman/Aquaman Hour of Adventure, which featured his first exposure to the Teen Titans. This led to Faerber's interest in comic books, beginning with Marv Wolfman and George Pérez's The New Teen Titans #25 in 1982, the first comic book with which he discovered that medium's more mature storylines and detailed artwork. Faerber's view of the series' ability, at the time, to stand on its own without requiring reading the related titles influenced Faerber's stated practice of keeping his own creator-owned books independent of one another, in order to avoid obligating readers of one of his titles to read the others in order to comprehend the storyline. The title also led to Faerber's interest in many other titles, such as Marvel Comics' Uncanny X-Men.

During the early part of his childhood, Faerber would buy his comics from a local pharmacy, which limited his reading to Marvel and DC Comics. For Christmas 1986, Faerber, a high school freshman, was taken by his mother to his first comic book shop, Gema Books, where he discovered books from companies other than the Big Two, such as Elementals, Miracleman and The New Wave, the latter of which impressed him with its experimental biweekly, 16-page format, its emphasis on character depth over physical combat, and the originality of the character's personalities.

As a child, Faerber would write and draw his own comics, though he assumed that writing was merely a means to provide something for him to draw. This changed by his first or second year of high school, when he discovered the TV series Spenser: For Hire, and later, the novels on which it was based by Robert B. Parker, whom Faerber names as the biggest single influence on his career as a writer. Although he had already been a fan of other private eye shows such as Magnum, P.I. and Riptide, the humor, intelligence and pace of the first Spenser novel he read, Ceremony, had such an effect on him that he tried writing a prose mystery story starring a private eye from one of his comics, which he let his English teacher read. The teacher, Maureen Purcell, the daughter of Golden Age comics artist Howard Purcell, praised Faerber's story. Faerber continued drawing, but concentrated more on prose writing. He was accepted as an art major at a local community college, but dropped out after one semester, when an instructor told him he needed to learn how to draw in order to draw comics. Realizing that his abilities lay in writing, he switched majors.

Faerber has also cited as influences the crime novels of Andrew Vachss, Robert Crais and Lee Child, as well as the television writing and detective novels of Stephen J. Cannell, in particular his work on the TV series Wiseguy, and Chris Haddock's work on the Canadian TV series Da Vinci's Inquest.

Seminal works in the comics medium that Faerber has cited as influences include John Byrne's work on Alpha Flight, Mark Waid's work on Captain America, Fabian Nicieza's runs on The New Warriors and Psi-Force, Mike Grell's work on Jon Sable, Freelance, Bob Harras' work on The Avengers, and Robert Kirkman's work on the comic book Invincible.

== Career ==
Faerber first broke into the comic book industry in 1998, when Marvel Comics purchased a story he wrote for the series What If...?. The book had already been cancelled, so the editor had no compunction about hiring him to write the final issue.

Faerber's first ongoing series writing assignment was Generation X, which he began with issue #45 (December 1998). Assignments on The New Warriors and The Titans would follow.

In 2002, Faerber began publishing through Image Comics the series Noble Causes, which follows the lives of the Nobles, a wealthy superhero family, and which emphasized their interpersonal conflicts over battles with supervillain enemies. The series lasted until 2008, and concluded with issue #40.

In 2007, Faerber debuted the Noble Causes spinoff, Dynamo 5, which starred a group of five illegitimate of the assassinated superhero Captain Dynamo, who were assembled by Dynamo's widow in order to protect Tower City. Like Noble Causes, Dynamo 5 was also a monthly series by Image Comics that depicted the superhero family dynamics, but placed more emphasis on action, dividing its content between the team's battles with adversaries and its interpersonal conflicts. Dynamo 5 ended its ongoing run with issue #25 (Oct. 2009), and continued with a series of miniseries and one-shots.

In 2008, Faerber published a miniseries called Gemini, which stars Dan Johnson, an ordinary man who is unaware that at night, he comes under the control of an organization called the Constellation, who transform ordinary people like him into crimefighters named after star constellations, without any of these people retaining any knowledge or memory of these events. Although intended as a five-issue miniseries, the last issue published was issue #4 (July 2009), which featured a guest appearance by Dynamo 5. In December 2016, Image published Gemini: The Complete Series, which included the unpublished fifth issue.

In September 2011, Faerber debuted Near Death, a crime series whose lead character, Markham, is an assassin who sets out to atone for his past sins after capturing a glimpse of hell during a near-death experience. During the course of the book, which mostly consists of self-contained stories, Markham saves people's lives (some of whom are targeted by other hitmen working for his former clients), not because his near-death experience made him a more altruistic person, but solely because of his self-interested motive in avoiding hell, a point with which Faerber hopes to explore questions of moral character and the nature of heroism. In creating the series, Faerber was inspired by the work of Andrew Vachss, Robert B. Parker, Robert Crais and Lee Child, and 80s crime shows such as The Equalizer and Stingray. In particular, the lack of any known first name for Markham is inspired by Vachss' Burke series and Parker's Spenser. It is Faerber's first series that does not feature any science fiction or fantasy elements, as it is a straight-crime drama.

Faerber was a writer on the CW TV series Ringer, which starred Sarah Michelle Gellar, and ran from September 2011 to May 2012. Faerber then worked on the staff of the CW TV series Star-Crossed, which lasted one season, from 2013 - 2014.

In 2014 Faerber premiered Copperhead, a science fiction Western series set on a planet of the same name. The series, which is drawn by Scott Godlewski, is inspired by the idea,"What if Deadwood had aliens?" He also joined the writing staff of the CBS TV series Zoo, which began airing in 2015. The first episode Faerber wrote was the series' fifth episode, "Blame It On Leo" and he remained with the show for its entire three year run. In 2019 Faerber joined the writing staff of Supergirl.

== Personal life ==
Faerber lived in the Gig Harbor, Washington area, before moving with his wife to Burbank, California shortly before September 2014.

== Filmography ==
- Ringer
  - 1.08 - Maybe We Can Get a Dog Instead (writer) (2011)
  - 1.16 - You're Way Too Pretty to Go to Jail (writer with Cathryn Humphris) (2012)
  - 1.19 - Let's Kill Bridget! (writer with Bob Berens) (2012)
- Avengers Assemble
  - 1.09 - Depth Charge (writer with Man of Action) (2013)
  - 1.14 - Hulk's Day Out (writer with Man of Action) (2013)
- Star-Crossed
  - 1.07 - To Seek A Foe (writer) (2014)
  - 1.11 - Give me a Torch (writer with Marc Halsey) (2014)
- Zoo
  - 1.05 - Blame It on Leo (writer) (2015)
  - 1.08 - The Cheese Stands Alone (writer with Scott Rosenberg) (2015)
  - 1.10 - Emotional Contagion (writer) (2015)
  - 2.03 - Collision Point (writer with Rebekah F. Smith) (2016)
  - 2.06 - Sex, Lies & Jellyfish (writer with Matt Pitts) (2016)
  - 2.10 - Yellow Brick Road (writer with Matt Pitts) (2016)
  - 3.03 - Ten Years Gone (writer with Shintaro Shimosawa) (2017)
  - 3.07 - Wham, Bam, Thank You Sam (writer with Shintaro Shimosawa) (2017)
  - 3.10 - Once Upon a Time in the Next (writer with Shintaro Shimosawa) (2017)
- Supergirl
  - 5.04 - In Plain Sight (writer with Jess Kardos) (2019)
  - 5.09 - Crisis on Infinite Earths: Part One (teleplay with Derek Simon, story by Robert Rovner & Marc Guggenheim) (2019)
  - 5.15 - Reality Bites (writer with Dana Horgan) (2020)
  - 6.01 - Rebirth (teleplay with Jess Kardos, story by Robert Rovner & Jessica Queller) (2021)
  - 6.08 - Welcome Back, Kara (writer with Dana Horgan) (2021)
  - 6.13 - The Gauntlet (teleplay with Brooke Pohl, story by Dana Horgan) (2021)
  - 6.19 - The Last Gauntlet (teleplay with Derek Simon, story by J. Holtham) (2021)
- Invincible
  - 3.03 - You Want a Real Costume, Right? (writer) (2025)

== Bibliography ==
=== DC Comics ===
- Secret Origins 80 Page Giant (Wonder Girl story only) (1998)
- Young Justice 80 Page Giant #1 (10 page Impulse story) (1999)
- Secret Files & Origins Guide to the DC Universe (3 page backup) (2000)
- Young Justice: Sins of Youth Secret Files #1 (Main story) (2000)
- Young Justice #22 (5 page Red Tornado Story) (2000)
- Titans Secret Files #1-2 (1999; 5 page backup story)
- Titans Secret Files #2 (2000; main story and profiles)
- Superman 80 Page Giant #3 (2000)
- Superman Adventures #48 (2000)
- Green Lantern Circle of Fire: Green Lantern/Firestorm #1 (2000)
- The Titans #13, #17-20 (Co-written with Devin Grayson) (2000)
- Superboy #80-82 (2000–2001)
- The Batman Chronicles #23 (Jason Bard Story only) (2001)
- The Titans #21 - 41 (2000–2002)
- Adventures of Superman #577 (Dialog only), #607 (2000, 2002)
- Green Lantern #126-128, 157 (2000, 2003)
- DC Universe Holiday Special '09 (Batman story only) (2009)

=== DC Comics / Wildstorm ===
- Gen-Active #1-6 (2000–2001)
- Robotech #0-6 (2003)
- Robotech: Love and War #1-6 (2003–2004)
- Robotech: Invasion #1-5 (2004)

=== Digital Webbing ===
- Digital Webbing Presents #25 (Firebirds story only) (2005)

=== Harris Comics ===
- Vampirella #15-18 (2002–2003)
- Vampirella Halloween: Trick & Treat ("Lust" story only) (2004)

=== Harris Comics / Anarchy Studios ===
- Xin: Legend of the Monkey King #1-3 (2002–2003)
- Xin: Journey of the Monkey King #1-3 (2003)
- Vampi Vs Xin #1-2 (2004–2005)

=== IDW ===
- Angel Spotlight On Conner #1 (2006)

=== Image Comics ===
- Noble Causes: First Impressions #1 (2001)
- Noble Causes #1-4 (2002)
- Noble Causes: Family Secrets #1-4 (2002–2003)
- Noble Causes: Distant Relatives #1-4 (2003)
- Venture #1-4 (2003)
- Dodge's Bullets (2004)
- Firebirds (2004)
- The Pact #2 (2005)
- Four Letter World ("Loud" story only) (2005)
- Image Holiday Special (2005)
- Dynamo 5 Annual #1 (2008)
- Gemini #1-4 (2008–2009)
- Noble Causes Vol. 2 #1-40 (2004–2009)
- Dynamo 5 #1-25 (2007–2009)
- Dynamo 5: Sins of the Father #1-5 (2010)
- Near Death #1-11 (Sept 2011–July 2012)
- Point of Impact #1-4 (October 2012 - January 2013)
- Copperhead #1-19 (2014–2018)
- Graveyard Shift #1-4 (2014-2015)
- Secret Identities #1-7 (co-written with Brian Joines) (2015)
- Elsewhere #1-8 (2017-2018)
- Over My Dead Body Graphic Novel (2020)

=== Image Comics / Top Cow Productions ===
- Strykeforce #1-5 (2004)
- Pilot Season: "Urban Myths" (2008)
- Witchblade Annual (2009)

=== Marvel Comics ===
- What If...? #114 (1998)
- X-Force #84 (Dialog only) (1998)
- Mutant X Annual 1999 (1999)
- Captain America #23 (co-writer w/ Mark Waid) (1999)
- Uncanny X-Men #374 (co-writer w/ Alan Davis) (1999)
- Generation X #45, #48-62, Annual '99 (1998–2000)
- New Warriors Vol. 2 #0-10 (1999–2000)
- X-Men The Movie: Wolverine (2000)
- Iron Fist/Wolverine #1 - 4 (2000–2001)
- X-Men: Evolution #9 (2002)
- Amazing Fantasy Vol. 2 #13 - 14 (Captain Universe backups only) (2005)
- Captain Universe/Hulk #1 (2006)
- Captain Universe/Daredevil #1 (2006)
- Captain Universe/X-23 #1 (2006)
- Captain Universe/The Invisible Woman #1 (2006)
- Captain Universe/Silver Surfer #1 (2006)
- Doc Samson Vol. 2 #3 (2006)
- The Halo Graphic Novel ("Armor Testing" story) (2006)
- War of Kings: Warriors #2 (2009)

=== MonkeyBrain Comics ===
- Anti-Hero #1-10 (2013-2014)

=== Moonstone Comics ===
- Moonstone Noir: The Hat Squad (2002)

| Preceded by Evan Skolnick | New Warriors writer 1999–2000 | Succeeded by Zeb Wells |
| Preceded by Larry Hama | Generation X writer 1999–2000 | Succeeded by Warren Ellis & Brian Wood |
| Preceded by Devin Grayson | Teen Titans writer 2000–2002 | Succeeded by Tom Peyer |
| Preceded by Ron Marz | Green Lantern writer 2000 | Succeeded by Judd Winick |
