= Invincible season 4 =

Fourth season of animated television series Invincible

Invincible
- Season 4
- Promotional poster
- Starring: Steven Yeun; Sandra Oh; J. K. Simmons
- No. of episodes: 8

Release
- Original network: Amazon Prime Video
- Original release: March 18 – April 22, 2026

Season chronology
- ← Previous; Season 3

The fourth season of the American adult animated superhero series Invincible, based on the comic book series of the same name, was created for television by comic book writer Robert Kirkman who also wrote the comics. The season was produced by Amazon MGM Studios in association with Point Grey Pictures, Skybound North, Skybound Animation and Wind Sun Sky Entertainment. The series focuses on the aftermath of the Invincible War and Mark Grayson's fight with Conquest as depicted in the previous season. Meanwhile, Mark's father Nolan returns to Earth, as they along with Mark's brother Oliver join the Coalition of Planets in the Viltrumite War.

The season's overall plot shifts towards Nolan's past by providing deeper insights into Viltrumite society and highlighting Nolan's role in the Viltrum Empire's thirst for conquest. Furthermore, it presents a new perspective on the Empire that was absent from the original comics. The season introduces new cast members Danai Gurira and Lee Pace, the latter of whom debuts as the voice of Grand Regent Thragg, leader of the Empire and the series' main antagonist.

The season consists of eight episodes. The first three episodes were released simultaneously on Amazon Prime Video on March 18, 2026, with the remaining episodes scheduled for weekly release until April 22, 2026. The show received largely positive reviews, preserving its 100% rating on the review aggregator website Rotten Tomatoes.

== Episodes ==
No. overall	No. in season	Title	Directed by	Written by	Original release date
26	1	"Making the World a Better Place"	Sol Choi	Helen Leigh	March 18, 2026
Mark, Oliver, and Eve continue stopping threats while dealing with the physical and mental aftermath of Angstrom and Conquest. Cecil appoints Brit as leader of the Guardians and brings the Teen Team back. Mark meets Dinosaurus, a powerful being he nearly kills despite learning the creature's human host lacks control in his transformed state. Mark and Eve have a difficult dinner with Eve's parents. Meanwhile, the Sequids prepare another invasion, and an alien named Universa arrives on Earth, draining energy from a power plant to save her people. Mark and Eve intercept her, and Eve struggles as her powers become unstable during the fight, but Universa is eventually defeated. Paul and Debbie decide to move in together. The Guardians confront the Sequid threat, and with Mark's help, they save all infected civilians using new technology, though Mark reluctantly kills Rus Livingston, the final host, to end the danger. Elsewhere, Conquest escapes captivity and leaves Earth.
27	2	"I'll Give You the Grand Tour"	Jason Zurek	Simon Racioppa	March 18, 2026
On the way to Talescria, Nolan tells Allen about his harsh Viltrumite upbringing, where he trained young cadets and endured a brutal trial against his parents to prove his adulthood. Soon after, the Scourge virus devastated the Viltrumites, killing billions, including his parents. The Grand Regent imposed a quarantine, sealed the planet, and ordered the extermination of all alien slaves who knew of the outbreak. The few survivors began seeking compatible species across the galaxy to preserve their race. On Talescria, Thaedus reveals he is the Betrayer who killed Emperor Argall. Using Nolan's knowledge, the Coalition gathers weapons and allies like Space Racer and the Sinlak beetles. Thaedus later admits he created the Scourge virus and has an improved version. Though angered, Nolan agrees to recruit his son after Thaedus promises the virus was a last resort. Meanwhile, Conquest returns to Viltrum and reports his failure to Grand Regent Thragg.
28	3	"I Gotta Get Some Air"	Stephanie Gonzaga	Ross Stracke	March 18, 2026
Machine Head tells Titan that Mister Liu survived and is pursuing them. Titan is attacked by Liu's assassin Magnattack but kills him. Mark struggles with killing Rus, while Eve loses control of her powers. Robot expels a Sequid, which Monster Girl destroys, leading them to wonder whether Mark was right. Titan asks Invincible for help, but Mark and Eve send Oliver instead. Eve seeks guidance from Robot. Meanwhile, the Flaxans return and attack Earth, and Mark joins the Guardians in response. Oliver and Titan confront Liu, while Robot and Monster Girl enter the Flaxan dimension to destroy their anti-aging technology, discovering a highly advanced civilization that threatens humanity. Before others can follow, the portal is closed, trapping them. Mark later helps Oliver fight Liu, forcing him to retreat. Misinterpreting Titan's actions, Mark attacks him until Oliver stops him. With Liu still active, Titan is forced to rejoin Machine Head's Order, and Liu also returns to avoid further conflict. Eve learns she is pregnant.
29	4	"Hurm"	Ian Abando	Robert Kirkman	March 25, 2026
Mark confesses his actions to Art, who comforts him and gives him his old suit back. Eve calls Mark to stop Ka-Hor, but Damien Darkblood uses Nolan's blood in an attempt to summon him to Hell and accidentally summons Mark instead, allowing Ka-Hor to escape with a host. Darkblood explains that Volcanikka has seized the throne of Hell from Satan and plans to release monsters called the Vile to conquer Earth. Mark and Darkblood recover Satan's Molten Crown from Cerberus, restoring Satan's power and reviving Darkblood's wounded family. They confront Volcanikka, who defeats Satan, but Mark easily overpowers her, forcing her to retreat. Satan keeps the Vile imprisoned and sends Mark and Darkblood back to Earth's surface. Eve tells William about her pregnancy, while Debbie plans to move in with Paul. As Eve prepares to tell Mark about the pregnancy, Nolan and Allen arrive. Meanwhile, Satan secretly orders Darkblood to investigate Volcanikka's motives and considers going to the surface himself.
30	5	"Give Us a Moment"	Sol Choi	Adria Lang	April 1, 2026
Allen and Nolan discuss the situation with Mark and Eve, and Mark reluctantly agrees to join the Coalition's war against the Viltrumites. A remorseful Nolan apologizes to Debbie, who rejects him. Allen tracks down Zoe Thompson / Tech Jacket, who also agrees to join their cause, while Oliver insists on going as well. Eve chooses not to tell Mark about her pregnancy due to his impending departure. After saying goodbye to Eve, Debbie, and Paul, Mark and Oliver join Nolan, Allen, and Zoe aboard the Coalition ship, and they depart for Talescria. On the way, however, they are ambushed by a Viltrumite cruiser commanded by Conquest and two other Viltrumites, Lucan and Kradd. A battle ensues, culminating in a one-on-one fight between Mark and Conquest. Mark is disemboweled by Conquest, but manages to kill him by strangling and asphyxiating him. Nolan and Oliver find a badly wounded Mark, while Zoe and Allen hide on the hull of the Viltrumite ship as Lucan and Kradd continue searching for them. Thaedus decides that it is time for open war with the Viltrumites.
31	6	"You Look Horrible"	Jason Zurek	Amber Dupre	April 8, 2026
Open war between the Coalition and the Viltrum Empire begins, with Battle Beast and previously enslaved planets joining the Coalition. After burying Conquest, Nolan bonds with Oliver and trains him as they nurse Mark back to health for two months. Allen and Zoe are rescued by Space Racer, who kills Kradd. After several other Viltrumites are killed and the Coalition gains ground, Thragg orders a direct strike on Talescria to kill Thaedus, helped by the mole in lowering the planet's security. As a Viltrumite strike team attacks the capital, Thaedus, Allen and Zoe lead the fight, but are losing until the recovered Mark, Nolan and Oliver arrive to join the battle, and the Viltrumites are ultimately forced to retreat. After interrogating the mole, the heroes learn that Thragg is retreating to Viltrum to gather his forces, so Thaedus plans to pursue him there and strike before all the other remaining Viltrumites can return home.
32	7	"Don't Do Anything Rash"	Stephanie Gonzaga	Helen Leigh	April 15, 2026
Hundreds of years ago, Thaedus assassinates Emperor Argall after questioning the Viltrumites' brutality. Thragg is named ruler in his place, and orders the Viltrumites to fight each other to purge the weak from their society. In the present, Thaedus, Mark, Nolan, Oliver, Allen, Battle Beast, Zoe, and Space Racer travel to Viltrum to kill Thragg. They are ambushed by the Viltrumites, who hid in the ring of corpses, and a battle erupts. Thragg attempts to convince Nolan to join the Viltrumites again, but Nolan rejects him. Oliver attacks Thragg but is severely injured. Nolan directs Space Racer to fire a laser at Viltrum and is joined by Mark and Thaedus as they follow it into the planet's core, destroying the whole planet. Thaedus demands the Viltrumites surrender, but Thragg decapitates him. He then disembowels Nolan and beats Mark to the point of near death but chooses to spare them due to the Viltrumites' dwindled numbers. Nolan, Mark, and Oliver are rescued by the others as the Coalition names Allen their leader. As the Coalition searches for the Viltrumites, a horrified Mark realizes they have gone to Earth.
33	8	"Don't Leave Me Hanging Here"	Ian Abando	Simon Racioppa	April 22, 2026
Mark, Nolan, and Zoe race back to Earth, but find it intact. As Mark reunites with Debbie, Eve, and his friends, he experiences hallucinations of Thragg killing them. Nolan revisits the crater where he pummelled Mark, (Note: As depicted in the first season episode "Where I Really Come From".) and is confronted by a distrustful Cecil, who urges Nolan to get the Coalition to arrive quickly if the Viltrumites arrive on Earth. Eve tearfully informs Mark that she aborted her pregnancy in fear of having to raise the baby alone. Debbie goes to Talescria with Nolan to see Oliver, while Mark leisurely flies alone at Eve's suggestion, but he encounters Thragg. Thragg informs Mark that the remaining 37 Viltrumites are indeed on Earth, secretly living among humans to repopulate; he threatens to destroy the planet if they are disturbed, but promises that they will not interfere with human affairs if they are left alone. Mark reluctantly agrees to his terms. Meanwhile, Allen receives a post-mortem message from Thaedus and is instructed to use the perfected Scourge Virus to eliminate the remaining Viltrumites, even though it may also be lethal to humans.

== Cast and characters ==
=== Main ===
- Steven Yeun as Mark Grayson / Invincible
- Sandra Oh as Deborah "Debbie" Grayson
- J. K. Simmons as Nolan Grayson / Omni-Man
  - Talon Warburton as young Nolan

=== Recurring ===
- Gillian Jacobs as Samantha Eve Wilkins / Atom Eve
- Christian Convery as Oliver Grayson / Young Omni-Man
- Walton Goggins as Cecil Stedman
- Seth Rogen as Allen the Alien
- Jeffrey Dean Morgan as Conquest
- Shantel VanSanten as Anissa
- Ben Schwartz as Shapesmith
- Peter Cullen as Thaedus
- Fred Tatasciore as Adam Wilkins
- Chris Diamantopoulos as Donald Ferguson, Isotope
- Clancy Brown as Kregg, Damien Darkblood, Ka-Hor
- Tatiana Maslany as Telia
- Zoey Deutch as Zoe Thompson / Tech Jacket
- Jay Pharoah as Zandale Randolph / Bulletproof
- Khary Payton as Markus Grimshaw / Black Samson
- Grey Griffin as Amanda / Monster Girl, Betsy Wilkins, Daphne
- Ross Marquand as Rudy Connors / Robot
- Jonathan Banks as Brit
- Mark Hamill as Art Rosenbaum
- Cliff Curtis as Paul
- Scott Aukerman as Captain Pikell
- Phil LaMarr as Lucan, The Walking Dread
- Eric Bauza as D.A. Sinclair, Magnattack
- Winston Duke as Space Racer
- Lee Pace as Thragg

=== Guest ===
- Danai Gurira as Universa
- Matthew Rhys as David Anders / Dinosaurus
- Troy Baker as Nolan's father
- Courtenay Taylor as Nolan's mother
- Todd Williams as Titan
- Tzi Ma as Mister Liu
- Nicole Byer as Vanessa
- Jeffrey Donovan as Machine Head
- Indira Varma as Volcanikka
- Chloe Bennet as Riley
- Bruce Campbell as Satan
- Kate Mulgrew as Domina Darkblood
- Brandon Scott Jones as William Clockwell
- Bobby Moynihan as Edward Thompson
- Levar Burton as Tech Jacket Suit AI
- Andrew Morgado as Kradd
- Michael Dorn as Thokk / Battle Beast
- Frank Welker as Emperor Argall
- Luke Macfarlane as Rick Sheridan

== Production ==
=== Development ===
The season was produced by Amazon MGM Studios in association with Point Grey Pictures, Skybound North, Skybound Animation and Wind Sun Sky Entertainment. The executive producers were creator and showrunner Robert Kirkman, David Alpert, Simon Racioppa, Margaret M. Dean, Catherine Winder, Seth Rogen and Evan Goldberg. The co-executive producers are Helen Leigh and Cory Walker, all part of the production team since the series' inception. Supervising directors on the season include Dan Duncan, Shaun O'Neil, and Jeff Allen.

In July 2024, preceding the third-season premiere, Amazon renewed Invincible for a fourth season. Prior to the release of the fourth season, Amazon Prime Video, Kirkman and showrunner Simon Racioppa had already committed to the series’ long-term development, having previously renewed the show for multiple seasons.

In the lead-up to the fourth season, Kirkman and the creative team indicated that the series would begin adapting later arcs of the source material, marking a shift toward more narratives involving the Invincible-verse and the Viltrumite Empire. This direction was discussed in multiple interviews, where Kirkman noted that subsequent seasons would escalate the scale of the conflict and introduce major antagonists central to the comic’s overarching storyline.

=== Writing ===
The writing for the season was shaped by the aftermath of the "Invincible War" storyline, with the premiere episode depicting a world in recovery while advancing character development for Mark Grayson and his supporting cast.

=== Casting ===
To be completely honest, when he was cast in Foundation, I was also like, 'Is this [too] close? Am I gonna be able to cast him as Thragg if he's available? Is this gonna work?".

— Kirkman on the decision to cast Lee Pace as Grand Regent Thragg

The fourth season of Invincible continued the series’ approach of combining a stable core cast with the introduction of new characters drawn from later arcs of the comic. The season premiere, "Making the World a Better Place," retained the majority of the series’ established voice cast. Steven Yeun, Sandra Oh, and J. K. Simmons reprised their roles as Mark Grayson / Invincible, Debbie Grayson, and Nolan Grayson / Omni-Man, respectively, maintaining the central family dynamic of the series. Other returning actors include Gillian Jacobs as Atom Eve, Walton Goggins as Cecil Stedman, Cliff Curtis as Paul, and Ben Schwartz, who voiced both Rus and Shapesmith, alongside other actors whose characters were part of the ongoing story. Jonathan Banks reprised his role as Brit, appearing in the premiere; Christian Convery also returned as Oliver Grayson, showcasing the character’s progression into adolescence within the narrative.

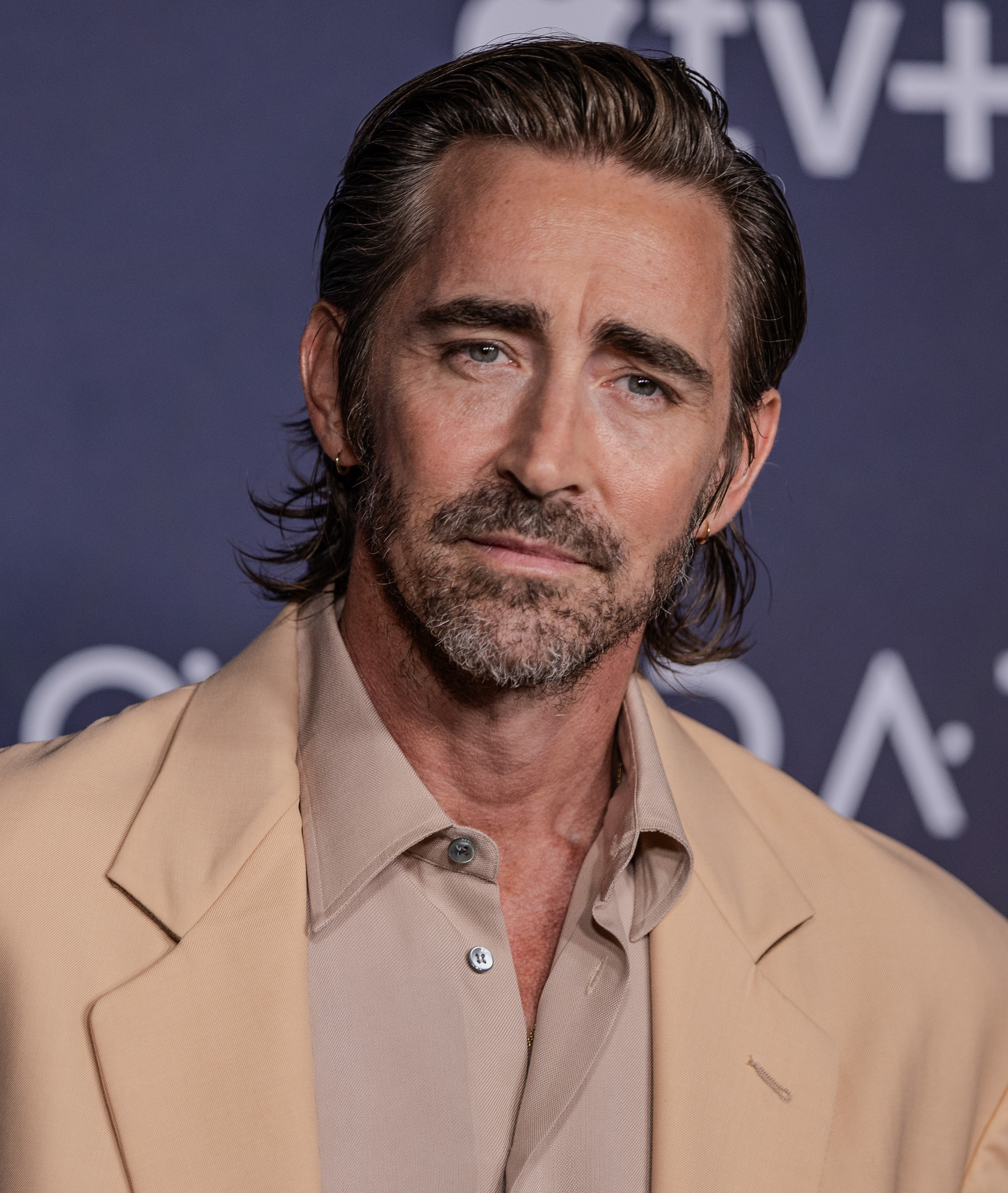
Lee Pace (pictured in 2025) starred in the season as Thragg.

As the series progressed, new characters were introduced. In October 2025, Entertainment Weekly announced Lee Pace would voice Grand Regent Thragg, considered one of the main antagonists and, according to Kirkman, the most powerful Viltrumite.

The decision to cast Pace as the character of Thragg was based on the production’s desire to introduce a commanding character in the role of the Viltrumite leader as the series began to follow the later narrative arcs in the storyline. The character’s introduction was a move towards a more expansive battle, and the casting decision was based on this as a reflection and required an actor capable of conveying authority and scale, with Pace selected for his ability to embody the character’s dominance and restraint, as discussed in interviews by series creator Robert Kirkman.

Additional casting included Matthew Rhys, whose involvement was announced by Deadline prior to the season’s release, with details of his role initially withheld. Later reports identified him as voicing Dinosaurus, who first appears in the comics in issue #68 where he battles Mark, who has robot arms after his battle with Conquest. Danai Gurira was also reported to have joined the cast as Universa.

== Music ==
John Paesano, who had composed the score across the first three seasons, returned to score the fourth season, with music supervision handled by Gabe Hilfer and Henry van Roden, both also continuing in roles they had held since the second season. The season combines Paesano's original compositions with a selection of licensed tracks drawn from rock, electronic, and hip-hop.

The season opens with "If I Get High" by English rock band Nothing But Thieves, a track from their 2015 self-titled debut album. The song accompanies a montage sequence setting the emotional tone for the season's opening episode. Among the season's more discussed musical moments, "Raining Blood" by California thrash metal band Slayer soundtracks the climactic sequence of the fourth episode, in which Mark Grayson teams up with Satan, voiced by Bruce Campbell, to battle the villainous Volcanikka in Hell. According to Robert Kirkman, the episode had to contain something unusual and new since he made up the plot especially for the series without referring to comics.

Earlier notable placements include "Tom Tom" by Canadian electronic band Holy Fuck, which became associated with the Flaxans, and Radiohead's "Karma Police", featured in the second season premiere.

== Release ==
The fourth season of Invincible premiered on March 18, 2026. The first three episodes of the season became available simultaneously on the online streaming service Amazon Prime Video. with subsequent episodes released weekly through April 22, 2026, when the season finale aired.

== Reception ==
=== Audience reception and viewership ===
The fourth episode, "Hurm," was received poorly by fans, becoming the lowest rated episode of the show on IMDb, falling below the previous low set during the second season with its second episode. Many viewers pointed to the episode's departure from the source material, which followed an original storyline set in Hell as the main reason for their disappointment. The teaser trailer for the fifth season featured Mark and Darkblood in a restaurant acknowledging the episode's negative reception. The rest of the season was received highly. The fifth episode, "Give Us a Moment", became the second-highest rated episode in the series' history on IMDb, behind only the third season finale.

Following the conclusion of the season, Invincible claimed the number one spot on Prime Video's top ten titles in the United States, surpassing the fifth and final season of The Boys.

=== Critical response ===
Professional ratings
Aggregate scores
Source	Rating
Metacritic	77/100
Rotten Tomatoes	100%
Review scores
Source	Rating
Nexus Point News	4/5 stars
IGN	8/10

On the review aggregator website Rotten Tomatoes, 100% of 24 critics' reviews are positive. The website's consensus reads: "Invincible enters its senior year with high marks in action, story, character, and adventure, still managing to make superheroes feel fresh and engaging." On Metacritic, which uses a weighted average, the season holds a score of 77 out of 100 based on 6 reviews, indicating "generally favorable reviews".

The season's animation drew mixed commentary from critics. In a review for Gizmodo, Isaiah Colbert noted that the series's near-annual release pace had begun to affect its animation quality, with certain action sequences exhibiting visible shortcuts, including slow-motion techniques and static frames used to simulate motion. He also remarked that there remained a possibility the season could recover with a stronger finale, as had been the case with the third season. In a similar review Pauli Poisuo of Looper noted that inconsistent animation quality across the season was a recurring concern among viewers, though it was not considered a significant obstacle to the season's overall reception.

Ben Travers of Decider gave the season a positive review, noted the season's emphasis on the fallout from past events and Mark Grayson's efforts to regain trust in the face of fresh dangers, describing it as preserving the show's blend of character-driven storytelling and action. Writing for Screen Rant, Craig Elvy described the season as one of the series’ most emotionally driven installments, emphasizing its focus on character development and thematic weight. Similarly, Siddhant Adlakha of IGN said that, despite some pacing issues and narrative detours, the season represents one of the show’s most expansive entries, with an increased scale and broader storytelling focus. Kaiya Shunyata of RogerEbert.com reviewed the season, stating that is the series's strongest entry to date: stating that "Invincible confronts its audience with a question that has long troubled generations: is violence inherent, or is it passed down?." As for the themes, Shunyata stated that the "Violence and intergenerational violence had been treated with more depth than in previous seasons." Shunyata also commented on Steven Yeun's arc, as well as the voicing of actor J.K. Simmons as Nolan," And ended up praising how season managed to change course and concentrate more on developing the characters rather than action.

Other reviews presented more mixed observations. A review from TheDemonster described the premiere as largely focused on setup, with early episodes emphasizing character conflict and preparation for future story arcs rather than immediate resolution.

In a similar review, from Nexus Point News and Nerd Initiative described the season as the start of a new phase for the series. They highlighted its focus on transition, increased world-building, and the introduction of new conflicts. Additionally, they pointed out that the early episodes mainly serve as preparation for later developments. Christopher Mills of Nexus Point News rated the series 4 out of 5 stars.
