= Give Us a Moment =

- Invincible episode
- Mark Grayson (Steven Yeun) begins strangling Conquest (Jeffrey Dean Morgan).
- Episode no.: Season 4 Episode 5
- Directed by: Sol Choi
- Written by: Adria Lang
- Based on: Volume 14: The Viltrumite War (Issue #71)
- Original air date: April 1, 2026
- Running time: 54 minutes

Guest appearances
- Zoey Deutch as Tech Jacket; LeVar Burton as Tech Jacket's Suit; Bobby Moynihan as Edward Thompson; Andrew Morgado as Kradd

Episode chronology
← Previous "Hurm"	Next → "You Look Horrible"
- Invincible season 4

"Give Us a Moment" is the fifth episode of the fourth season of the adult animated superhero series Invincible and the thirtieth episode overall. It was written by series creator Adria Lang and directed by Sol Choi. It originally aired on the Amazon Prime Video on April 1, 2026, as part of its scheduled weekly release rollout. The episode is adapted from Volume 14: The Viltrumite War arc (Issues #71 and #72) of the comic book series created by Robert Kirkman, Cory Walker, and Ryan Ottley.

The episode follows the aftermath and wider consequences of recent conflicts involving the Viltrumite Empire. It follows Mark Grayson and Oliver Grayson as they undertake a new, high-risk mission, after being summoned by Nolan Grayson and Allen the Alien. An action that leaves Debbie Grayson unsettled, while prompting Atom Eve to reassess her personal direction and emotional stability.

The episode received critical acclaim, and is considered one of the best episodes of the series.

== Plot ==
Nolan Grayson reveals to Mark Grayson that the Viltrum Empire originally sent him to Earth to determine whether humans could serve as a viable genetic match for Viltrumites, whose population had been severely diminished. Nolan then urges Mark to join the ongoing resistance against the Viltrum Empire and that they must depart the next day. Nolan later goes to Debbie Grayson's home and attempts to apologize to her for the harm he caused to her family and the devastation he caused to Earth. Debbie rejects his apology, stating that the damage cannot be undone or repaired.

Meanwhile, Tech Jacket, revealed to be a girl named Zoe, finishes a battle with the Walking Dread before meeting Allen with her father and agreeing to help fight the Viltrumite Empire. Later, Mark attempts to provide comfort to a still upset Debbie. Oliver Grayson soon enters, frustrated that Nolan did not acknowledge him during his visit and insists he join Mark in fighting the Viltrumites. Before departure, Debbie requests a dinner with the Grayson family before Mark and Oliver leave, which Eve and Paul join in on.

The next day, Zoe, Mark, and Oliver board the ship to fight the Viltrum Empire, despite Nolan's apprehension to Oliver's joining. Deep into space, they are ambushed by Conquest along with fellow Viltrumite warriors Kradd and Lucan. A battle ensues as Conquest immediately confronts Mark, while the other Viltrumites divide their attacks across the group; with Oliver facing Lucan whilst both Allen and Zoe engage Kradd, all the while Mark becomes locked in repeated combat with Conquest himself. Oliver begins to lose oxygen in space, prompting Nolan to direct him toward a nearby planet to recover, leading Conquest to follow him. Mark intercepts Conquest on the planet’s surface, leading to a violent confrontation. They ravage the planet's terrain as Mark manages to grab hold of Conquest's neck and begins choking him. Conquest punches a hole through Mark’s stomach and starts disemboweling him, but Mark maintains his hold long enough to finally kill Conquest by strangling him to death. Oliver and Nolan arrive to find Mark barely conscious and gravely injured. Separately, Allen and Zoe remain concealed beneath a Viltrumite vessel, unsure of their survival.

== Production ==
"Give Us a Moment" was written by Adria Lang, executive produced by David Alpert and Margaret M. Dean, and directed by Sol Choi. The episode continues the comic adaptation of the Viltrumite War arc from Robert Kirkman, Cory Walker, and Ryan Ottley’s comic series. The Coalition of Planets, led by Thaedus and Allen, escalates its conflict with the Viltrum Empire by recruiting allies including Mark Grayson, Nolan Grayson, Oliver Grayson, Battle Beast, Space Racer, and Tech Jacket.

The episode introduces Tech Jacket as a key addition to the coalition, using Geldarian-designed armor that allows her to adapt to interstellar combat scenarios. It also features a space infiltration sequence involving Allen and Tech Jacket evading Viltrumite forces aboard an enemy ship, noted for its resemblance to The Empire Strikes Back (1980) in its tactical execution. Guest stars in this episode include Zoey Deutch, LeVar Burton, Bobby Moynihan, Andrew Morgado and Phil LaMarr.

== Reception ==
Audience and aggregator responses were notably strong, with the episode receiving high user ratings and being described in some coverage as one of the season’s best-performing entries in terms of audience reception, reflecting significant engagement with its climactic sequences and emotional payoff.

IGN writer Siddhant Adlakha praised the episode, and reacted positively, described it as an extremely vital episode, which manages to add both emotional development of the characters with the signature graphic violence of the show. The review pointed to the long-awaited reunion between Mark and Nolan Grayson as well as the emphasis made by the episode on the consequences of Nolan’s deeds from the emotional perspective in his dialogues with Debbie Grayson and Art. Secondly, Adlakha emphasized that Sandra Oh’s acting played an immense role in infusing emotional depth into the quiet parts of the episode. Finally, Adlakha also highlighted the final confrontation with Conquest as exceptionally brutal and one of the most violent sequences in the series to date. Adlakha gave the episode a rating of 9 out of 10. In a similar review David Kaldor from Bubbleblabber pointed out Nolan’s efforts in coming to terms with his past as one of the most interesting aspects of this episode. Moreover, Kaldor also pointed out the acting skills of Sandra Oh as Debbie Grayson as being one of the most notable aspects of the show. In particular, the rematch between Mark and Conquest is one of the highlights of the episode.

Gary Catig of AIPT felt that episode received attention for its combination of intimacy and action, with Catig praising the fact that the show still stands out due to its ability to contrast its tone and tell stories based on real consequences. Nolan Grayson's efforts to reconcile with his family were cited as the main story driver of the episode. Keith Noakes of Keith Loves Movies praised the episode’s focus on the Grayson family’s strained relationships following Nolan’s return, alongside its large-scale action sequences. He described it as a strong transitional episode and gave it an 85 out of 100 rating.
