= Invincible VS =

2026 video game

- Developers: Quarter Up exA-Arcadia (Arcade)
- Publishers: Skybound Games exA-Arcadia (Arcade)
- Director: Dave Hall
- Producer: Mike Willette
- Designers: Rip Parbhoo; Bau Bautista
- Artist: Dan Eder
- Writer: Michael C. Rogers
- Composer: The Glitch Mob
- Series: Invincible
- Engine: Unreal Engine 5
- Platforms: PlayStation 5; Windows; Xbox Series X/S; Arcade
- Release: April 30, 2026
- Genre: Fighting
- Modes: Single-player, multiplayer

Invincible VS is a 2026 fighting video game developed by Quarter Up and published by Skybound Games. It is based on the Amazon Prime Video animated series adaptation of the Image Comics series Invincible, with members of the show's voice cast reprising their roles. The game was released on April 30, 2026, for PlayStation 5, Windows, and Xbox Series X/S.

== Gameplay ==
Invincible VS is a fighting game based around teams of three characters, which players can tag between during battle. Players can perform an "active tag", switching characters in the middle of a combo to continue attacking. Players can also perform a "counter tag", allowing them to escape a combo during an active tag if performed correctly. The game includes a cinematic story mode, along with arcade and training modes. The game supports local and online multiplayer with rollback netcode.

=== Characters ===
The game features a base roster of 18 playable characters, with four additional characters planned as downloadable content.

- Agent Spider (Note: Downloadable content)
- Allen the Alien
- Angstrom Levy
- Anissa
- Atom Eve
- Battle Beast
- Bulletproof
- Cecil Stedman
- Conquest
- Dupli-Kate
- Ella Mental
- The Immortal
- Invincible
- Lucan
- Monster Girl
- Omni-Man
- Powerplex
- Rex Splode
- Robot
- Titan
- Thula
- Universa

== Plot ==
Invincible and his allies are battling against Omni-Man and the Viltrumites on Earth, but begin to suspect something is wrong, noticing their foes are acting out of character. Briefly glimpsing a strange enclosure after taking a heavy blow, Invincible begins purposefully injuring himself until his surroundings disappear, finding himself in a high tech facility. When he is attacked by Robot, Rex Splode, and new hero Ella Mental, he realizes they all have implants causing them to experience hallucinations. Determining that damaging the implants is the only way to shut them off, Invincible defeats the others in battle, overloading their implants and restoring them to normal.

Unsure where they are or how they arrived, the heroes venture further into the facility, discovering several others undergoing implantation in suspended animation chambers. The facility releases the implantees, forcing Invincible and the others to battle them and return them all to their senses. Robot's analysis determines that the facility is on an asteroid near the Earth, but the group are unable to find a way to escape. Cecil begins accusing Ella of being an imposter, but Invincible notices he has no implant and attacks him, damaging his holographic disguise and revealing him to be a Technician. As he is pursued by the group, several other Technicians appear and explain that they abducted the heroes and villains to harvest the energy expended from their battles, planning to keep them all contained to act as a power source.

The Technicians force the captives into a holographic battlefield and use their disguise technology to assume the appearance and powers of the Viltrumites. The captives attempt to fight them, but discover the Technicians' disguises make them impervious to damage. During the battle, a tower is exposed that causes the Technicians' healing abilities to temporarily malfunction. Realizing the tower is the facility's power source, Invincible flies through it, disrupting the hologram but leaving the Technicians' disguises intact. Ella deduces that the power source extends throughout the whole asteroid and begins using her powers to tear it apart while the others keep the Technicians occupied. The destruction of the power source causes the Technicians' disguises to fail, allowing the captives to eliminate them one by one. Determining their experiment has failed, one of the Technicians teleports the heroes back to Earth, which they discover has been taken over by the Technicians in their absence.

== Development and release ==
Invincible VS is the first game developed by Quarter Up, a Los Angeles-based studio founded by several members of the development team behind Killer Instinct (2013). Quarter Up is the first in-house development studio under publisher Skybound Games. Several members of the animated series' voice cast reprise their roles for the game, including J.K. Simmons, Gillian Jacobs, Jason Mantzoukas, Michael Dorn, and others. The developers created an original character for the game, Ella Mental (voiced by Tierra Whack), in collaboration with series creators Robert Kirkman and Cory Walker; the character's backstory was detailed in backup stories printed in the Invincible spin-off comic Capes.

The game was announced on June 8, 2025 during the Xbox Summer Showcase livestream. It was released on April 30, 2026, on PlayStation 5, Windows and Xbox Series X and S. The game is available in standard and deluxe editions digitally, the latter of which includes the first year character pass and additional cosmetics; a "Zero Suit" costume for Invincible was offered as a digital pre-order incentive. Physical editions of the game, including a standard edition with retailer-exclusive covers, and deluxe and collector's editions with additional physical rewards, were also released. Additional character costumes are available as paid downloadable content.

== Reception ==
Reception

Aggregate scores
Aggregator	Score
Metacritic	(PS5) 76/100 (PC) 72/100
OpenCritic	71% recommend

Review scores
Publication	Score
The A.V. Club	C
Destructoid	6/10
Game Informer	8.5/10
GamesRadar+	4/5
Giant Bomb	3.5/5
HobbyConsolas	79/100
IGN	7/10
Push Square	7/10
Shacknews	8/10

Invincible VS received mixed reviews from critics on Windows and generally positive reviews on PlayStation 5, according to review aggregation website Metacritic. The game was recommended by 71% of critics, according to OpenCritic.

Invincible VS was nominated for "Best Fighting Game" at The Game Awards 2026.
