= Conquest (character) =

Supervillain from the "Invincible" comic book series

- Conquest as depicted in Invincible #61 (August 2009). Art by Ryan Ottley.

Publication information
- Publisher: Skybound Entertainment (Image Comics)
- First appearance: Invincible #61 (April 2009)
- Created by: Robert Kirkman; Ryan Ottley
- Voiced by: Jeffrey Dean Morgan (television series); Ross Marquand (Invincible VS)

In-story information
- Species: Viltrumite
- Place of origin: Viltrum
- Team affiliations: Viltrum Empire
- Notable aliases: None
- Abilities: Superhuman strength, stamina, and speed; Near-invulnerability; Flight; Longevity; Combat expertise

Conquest is a supervillain appearing in the American comic book series Invincible and Invincible Universe: Battle Beast, created by writer Robert Kirkman and artist Ryan Ottley. the character first appeared in Invincible #61, published by Image Comics in April of 2009.

Conquest is a high-ranking member of the Viltrum Empire and one of the strongest, most experienced members of the alien race known as the Viltrumites. He survived both the Great Purge, a planet-wide civil conflict, and the Scourge Virus, a bioengineered disease that decimated the Viltrumite population and inflicted lasting damage on most of the survivors. Due to his weakened condition, Conquest was gravely injured in combat with several Rognarrs, members of a savage alien species. The assault left him with a missing right arm, a scarred face, and the loss of his right eye.

Jeffrey Dean Morgan voiced Conquest in the animated television series Invincible on Amazon Prime Video, while Ross Marquand voiced the playable character in Invincible VS (2026).

== Fictional character biography ==
Conquest is a millenia-old Viltrumite warrior. One of the oldest known members of the species, he is regarded as one of the Viltrumite Empire's strongest and most experienced warriors, surpassed in physical strength only by Thragg. Unlike many Viltrumites, whose actions are driven primarily by the Empire's expansionist goals, Conquest takes personal pleasure in combat and often seeks prolonged battles against opponents capable of matching his strength. His appearance is marked by numerous battle scars, including a prominent scar across his face.

He lived through two crucial events in Viltrumite history: the Great Purge, a civil conflict that eliminated those deemed weak from the society, and the Scourge Virus, a genetically engineered virus that devastated the Viltrumite population, reducing it to about fifty surviving Viltrumites, including Conquest. Survivors experienced long-term effects like reduced strength, resilience, and an impaired healing factor due to the virus's lasting damage on their bodies.

Following the Scourge Virus, Conquest experienced a temporary loss of much of his strength and invulnerability. During this period, he was attacked by Rognarrs, a species capable of overpowering weakened Viltrumites, losing his right arm and right eye in the encounter. Because of the lingering effects of the virus, the injuries did not heal completely, leading him to replace his missing arm with a prosthetic.

=== Arrival on Earth ===
Conquest arrives on Earth shortly after the conclusion of the Invincible War, as depicted in Invincible #61, a storyline later adapted in the Season 3 episode. He is sent to monitor Mark Grayson to ensure that he is working to bring the planet under the control of the Viltrumite Empire.

After Mark failed to prepare Earth for Viltrumite rule, the Empire dispatched Conquest to replace him. Regarded as one of its most effective enforcers, Conquest had a long record of successfully subjugating worlds. Unlike other Viltrumites such as Nolan (Omni-Man) and Anissa, who had framed their actions as beneficial, Conquest openly expresses his enjoyment of violence, saying, "I'm here because I enjoy this". His clash with Mark turns into a violent battle, causing significant destruction and casualties. During the fight, Conquest severely injures Atom Eve, Mark's girlfriend, provoking his fury. Mark eventually overpowers Conquest with repeated headbutts, leaving him apparently dead.

Unbeknownst to Mark, Conquest survives, and is secretly imprisoned by Cecil Stedman in a concrete bunker underneath the Mojave Desert, hoping to extract information about Viltrumite plans.

=== Viltrumite War and demise ===
Conquest reappears during the Viltrumite War as an operative of the Viltrumite Empire. Having recovered from earlier injuries, he escapes confinement under the supervision of Cecil Stedman and returns to report to Grand Regent Thragg. As a consequence of his prior failure, he is reassigned to intercept Omni-Man and Allen the Alien, who are transporting Mark Grayson (Invincible), his half-brother Oliver and Tech Jacket to assist the Coalition of Planets in its conflict against the Empire.

Conquest attacks and destroys the vessel carrying them, initiating a second confrontation with Mark. The engagement escalates when Omni-Man and Oliver intervene. During the battle, Oliver attempts to withdraw to a nearby planet, prompting Conquest to pursue him. Mark intercepts and restrains Conquest before starting to strangle him. And the two continue their struggle across the planet's surface. The encounter is marked by sustained close-quarters combat, with Conquest severely disemboweling Mark while Mark maintains his hold.

The fight concludes when Conquest dies from suffocation. Mark survives the encounter but is left critically injured and near death. Omni-Man and Oliver later locate him at the scene, remaining on the planet for an extended period as he falls into a coma and gradually recovers.

== Powers and abilities ==
Conquest possesses all of the normal abilities of a Viltrumite. He is extremely strong and durable, And has the capability to defeat extremely powerful opponents and can take a lot of physical damage while sustaining minimal injury himself. He is capable of independent flight and can travel at very high velocities, including in space, with the ability to maneuver freely in atmospheric and extraterrestrial environments. He also has enhanced senses such as enhanced eyesight and hearing. Including improved vision and hearing, which allow him to detect and respond to threats over long distances. Conquest has a regenerative healing factor that enables recovery from serious injuries over time, depending on severity. In addition, his Viltrumite physiology grants him extended longevity, resistance to extreme environmental conditions, and sustained physical performance over prolonged periods of exertion.

== Reception ==
Conquest has been recognized as one of the most brutal and memorable villains in the Invincible series. His appearances are often cited for their intense violence and psychological impact on the story's protagonist. Critics praised his introduction as a turning point in the series, significantly raising the narrative stakes and highlighting the darker aspects of the Viltrumite conflict.

== In other media ==
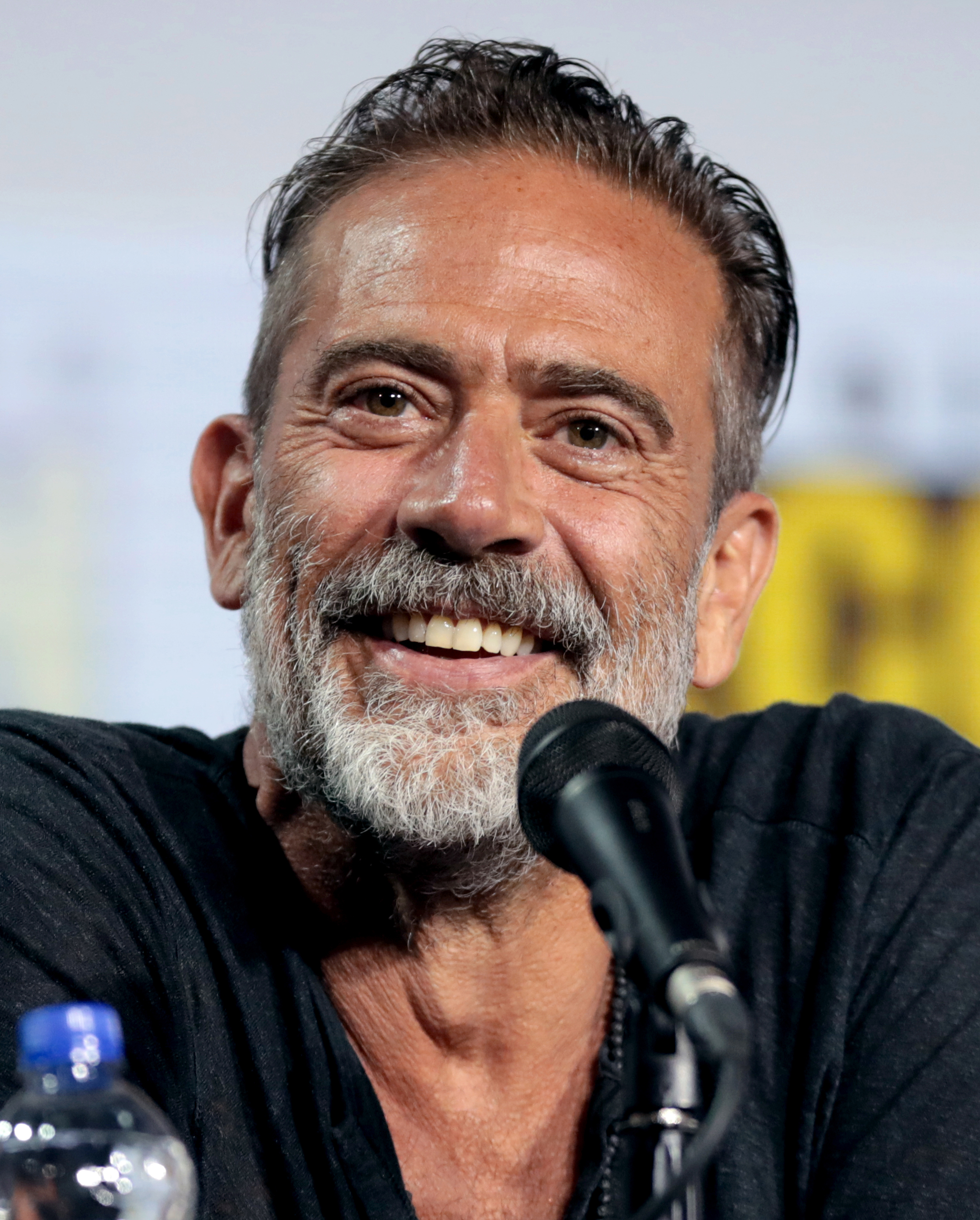
Jeffrey Dean Morgan voices Conquest in the Invincible TV series.

Conquest has also appeared in the animated television series Invincible on Amazon Prime Video, voiced by Jeffrey Dean Morgan.

Conquest appears in the 2023 video game Mortal Kombat 1 as a cameo in Omni-Man's arcade ending.

Conquest appears as a playable character in Invincible VS voiced by Ross Marquand.

== Collected editions ==
Conquest's key storylines appear in collected volumes:

- Invincible, Vol. 8: Eleven (first appearance during the War aftermath, issues #61–64).
- Invincible, Vol. 9: Heads Will Roll (continuation of his first battle).
- Invincible, Vol. 11: The Viltrum War (marks his final defeat in issues #71–72).
- Invincible, Vol. 20: Friends (Alternate Universe variant)
- Invincible Universe: Battle Beast, Vol. 2: The Emissary TP
