= Invincible season 1 =

Season of streaming series

Invincible
- Season 1
- Promotional poster
- Showrunner: Simon Racioppa
- Starring: Steven Yeun; Sandra Oh; J. K. Simmons
- No. of episodes: 8

Release
- Original network: Amazon Prime Video
- Original release: March 25 – April 29, 2021

Season chronology
- Next → Season 2

The first season of the American adult animated superhero series Invincible, based on the comic book series of the same name, was created for television by comic book writer Robert Kirkman, who also serves as the comics writer. The story focuses on Mark Grayson, an half-human and half-alien teenager who develops his powers at 17 years old and learns how to wield them to fight crime by becoming the superhero Invincible with the help of his father, the most powerful superhero on the planet under the alias Omni-Man. However, Mark is forced to face the harsh realities of being a superhero and the responsibilities that come from it, while his father Nolan is revealed to not be the heroic figure his family believe he is after he brutally murders the Guardians of the Globe.

Steven Yeun stars as Mark Grayson / Invincible, while Sandra Oh and J. K. Simmons play his parents Debbie Grayson and Nolan Grayson / Omni-Man, respectively. The recurring cast is composed of Gillian Jacobs, Andrew Rannells, Walton Goggins, Chris Diamantopoulos, Zachary Quinto, Ross Marquand, Jason Mantzoukas, Malese Jow, Grey Griffin, Kevin Michael Richardson, Khary Payton, Mark Hamill, Seth Rogen, Clancy Brown, and Zazie Beetz.

The season premiered on March 25, 2021, with its first three episodes, and the remaining five were released weekly until April 29, 2021. It received universal acclaim from critics, with praise towards the animation, action sequences, voice performances (particularly Yeun, Oh, and Simmons), the story, worldbuilding, mature themes, emotional weight, and faithfulness to the source material. The series was renewed for a second and third season on April 29, 2021.

== Episodes ==
No. overall	No. in season	Title	Directed by	Written by	Original release date
1	1	"It's About Time"	Robert Valley	Robert Kirkman	March 25, 2021
When hulking villainous scientist clones, the Mauler Twins, attack the White House, they are repelled by Nolan Grayson / Omni-Man and the Guardians of the Globe. Nolan's son, Mark Grayson, who is waiting for his powers to emerge, goes to school and defends classmate Amber Bennett from bully Todd Williams. After Todd beats Mark, Amber saves the latter and develops an interest in him. Later, Mark's powers of flight, super-strength, speed, and invulnerability emerge, and he tells his parents over dinner. While Nolan is initially uncertain, he nonetheless begins to train Mark on how to use them. However, Mark is caught off-guard when Nolan, emphasizing the severity of being a superhero, punches him too hard. Feeling hurt emotionally and physically, Mark, in his homemade suit, blows off steam by stopping a robbery led by a rocky-armored humanoid criminal. After a heart-to-heart with his son, Nolan takes Mark to meet superhero suit tailor Art Rosenbaum, who creates a proper superhero suit for Mark, who became a superhero known as "Invincible", as he easily defeated a superpowered-villain called Killcannon. Later, Omni-Man secretly ambushes and kills the Guardians at their headquarters before falling unconscious from injuries sustained from their resistance.
2	2	"Here Goes Nothing"	Paul Furminger	Simon Racioppa	March 25, 2021
The clandestine Global Defense Agency (GDA) nurses a comatose Omni-Man back to health, but fails to revive the Guardians of the Globe. GDA Director Cecil Stedman meets Mark and his mother Debbie. As extra-dimensional aliens called the Flaxans attack, Invincible helps the Teen Team fight them. When the Flaxans rapidly age and retreat, Teen Team leader Robot deduces this was due to a time dilation difference between the Flaxans' dimension and Earth. As Mark recognizes Atom Eve as classmate Samantha Eve Wilkins, they share their secret identities and become friends. The Flaxans return with anti-aging technology, but Invincible and the Teen Team destroy them, forcing another retreat. The Flaxans return once again and nearly succeed until a recuperated Omni-Man forces them back to their dimension, where he devastates their planet in retaliation before returning as news breaks of the Guardians' deaths. Meanwhile, Invincible skirmishes with Allen the Alien, who wants to test Earth's defenses for the Coalition of Planets. Using a time-out to talk and learn of Allen's mission, Invincible helps Allen realize he confused Earth for another planet called "Urath" and leaves on good terms. Concurrently, demon detective Damien Darkblood investigates the Guardians' deaths for Cecil, theorizing the killer was among the heroes.
3	3	"Who You Calling Ugly?"	Jeff Allen	Chris Black	March 25, 2021
Following a televised funeral, the Graysons attend the Guardians of the Globe's private burial with their loved ones, where Darkblood questions Nolan privately and hints at his suspicions. Cecil commissions Robot to form a new Guardians roster of his choosing, applauding his handling of the Flaxan invasions. Robot merges the Teen Team with experienced heroes Monster Girl, Black Samson, and Shrinking Rae. However, Atom Eve quits, resentful of her teammate and ex-boyfriend Rex Splode after catching him cheating on her with teammate Dupli-Kate. Mark gets Amber's number and sets up a "study date", which is interrupted when he is called to help Atom Eve stop Doc Seismic from attacking Mount Rushmore. Nonetheless, an intrigued Amber waits for him. When Rex tries apologizing to Eve, she refuses to accept and seeks out Mark, only to discover him with Amber. Despite being saddened, she acknowledges his happiness and quietly leaves. With Robot's unseen help, the Mauler Twins escape from their GDA prison, though one sacrifices the other. When Darkblood questions Debbie, he finds Nolan shared little with her. This encounter leaves her suspicious of Nolan, who senses Darkblood's lingering presence.
4	4	"Neil Armstrong, Eat Your Heart Out"	Cory Evans	Ryan Ridley	April 1, 2021
Angry that the GDA has not caught the original Guardians of the Globe' killer yet, Red Rush's widow Olga commissions Debbie to sell her house so she can return to Moscow. Cecil asks Nolan to protect the first mission to Mars, but the latter refuses, citing his duty to protect Earth, so Mark volunteers. Despite successfully landing, Mark's inattentiveness allows Martians to abduct the astronauts. The Martian Emperor orders their execution to prevent the parasitic Sequids from reaching Earth and destroying the universe. Mark hastily evacuates the astronauts, unaware that a Martian secretly replaced one of them while the real astronaut is possessed by the Sequids and launches an invasion of Mars. As Nolan and Debbie vacation in Rome to rekindle their relationship, he regains her trust with half-truths. Cecil realizes Omni-Man is the killer, but cannot act until he determines the latter's motive and a way to stop him. Knowing he will not drop the case, Cecil exiles Darkblood to Hell, unaware that the detective hid his notepad in Debbie's closet. As the surviving Mauler clones himself, Robot monitors his progress and methods before stealing a DNA sample from Rex on the behalf of his real self, the deformed Rudy Connors.
5	5	"That Actually Hurt"	Jay Baker	Christine Lavaf	April 8, 2021
After Debbie finds Darkblood's notepad, her lingering suspicions return, leading to her locating Omni-Man's bloodied super-suit while he is away. After Samson lectures his teammates on failing to protect civilians due to their infighting, Robot secretly approaches the restored Mauler Twins with a job offer. Meanwhile, Mark promises to help Amber at a soup kitchen she volunteers at as recompense for neglecting her while working as Invincible. However, he must also help the superpowered enforcer Titan (the criminal Mark fought before in the first episode during the robbery) defeat his boss Machine Head, who predicted their attack and hired multiple villains for security. The Guardians of the Globe arrive to help, but Invincible, Monster Girl, and Black Samson are beaten and severely wounded by Battle Beast, which prompts the rest of the Guardians to act as a team. Seeing the other villains swiftly defeated, a disgusted Battle Beast leaves. The GDA arrest Machine Head and medevac Invincible and the others, allowing Titan to take over Machine Head's organization. Eve volunteers alongside Amber, needing direction after quitting being a superhero, but leaves when Cecil calls her about Mark's hospitalization. Elsewhere, GDA scientists test samples of Invincible's blood, discovering that his cells are invulnerable to every test they run.
6	6	"You Look Kinda Dead"	Paul Furminger	Curtis Gwinn	April 15, 2021
Humbled by his week-long recovery, Mark reconciles with Amber before they accompany his best friend William on a visit to Upstate University to see his crush Rick Sheridan. However, a Reaniman cyborg that mad scientist D.A. Sinclair manufactured escapes confinement and fights Invincible before killing himself. As William deduces Invincible's true identity, Amber breaks up with Mark due to his "absence" during the Reaniman's rampage. He later sacrifices reconciliation to rescue William and Rick from Sinclair, who converted the latter into a Reaniman. William's pleas for help enable Rick to overcome his alteration and help Invincible defeat Sinclair. Following Sinclair's arrest, Cecil takes an interest in his technology, which overwhelmed Invincible's physiology. Meanwhile, Art examines Omni-Man's bloodied suit for Debbie, confirming that Omni-Man killed the Guardians of the Globe. Both fearfully agree to stay silent, but the revelation sends Debbie into a drunken depression. Having studied Monster Girl's biology beforehand, Robot gathers magical ingredients to heal her. While the Mauler Twins continue to grow a body for Robot, they also exhume the corpse of the Guardians' leader, the Immortal, intending to resurrect him as their enthralled weapon against Robot. Eve is inspired by Amber to skip college and use her powers in direct humanitarian endeavors.
7	7	"We Need to Talk"	Vinton Heuck	Simon Racioppa	April 22, 2021
After Debbie relocates to the GDA, she and Cecil witness Omni-Man kill his second-in-command Donald Ferguson and several GDA agents. After adding a neural link upgrade, the Rudy clone reluctantly euthanizes his progenitor before betraying the Mauler Twins. He explains himself to the Guardians of the Globe, who are taken aback by his revelations, before learning the truth about Omni-Man and their predecessors' fates. Cecil deploys Sinclair's "Reanimen" and a modified kaiju to attack Omni-Man. Unfazed by Mark revealing his superhero identity as Invincible, Amber dumps him as he never trusted her before. Mark seeks Eve's wisdom, but she criticizes his selfishness. When the two intercept Omni-Man's fight with the kaiju, Cecil orders Atom Eve to rendezvous with the Guardians. When the Maulers revive the Immortal, he awakens enraged over Omni-Man's betrayal and flies off to battle him in an attempt to avenge his team's murder. As Mark narrowly subdues the kaiju, news helicopters capture Omni-Man killing the Immortal again in a live broadcast before he asks to talk to a bewildered Invincible.
8	8	"Where I Really Come From"	William Ruzicka	Robert Kirkman	April 29, 2021
After revealing himself as an infiltrator for the Viltrum Empire sent to conquer Earth, Omni-Man fails to convince Invincible to join him and overpowers his son, devastating Chicago and killing thousands. Despite being beaten into a near-death state, Invincible causes Omni-Man to remember his love for his family. Unable to reconcile this with his duties, Omni-Man tearfully abandons Earth. The Guardians of the Globe and Atom Eve mobilize to aid Chicago relief efforts as the world learns of Omni-Man's betrayal while Cecil helps Debbie and Mark by falsifying Nolan's civilian death. A heartbroken Debbie and Art share a drink as Mark and Amber rekindle their relationship after his two-week recovery. As Amber and William learn Eve is also a superhero, Cecil sends Invincible to intercept an approaching Allen and update him on recent events. Allen warns Invincible that the Viltrumites will come for Earth given Omni-Man's uncharacteristic abandoning of his post, but he thinks that Invincible can help the Coalition stop the Viltrumites' expansion. As Mark plans to finish high school, the Mauler Twins are arrested, and the Immortal recuperates under GDA protection. Villainous forces conspire to return as Cecil commissions Sinclair to mass-produce Reanimen contingency troops.

== Cast and characters ==
=== Main ===
- Steven Yeun as Markus Sebastian "Mark" Grayson / Invincible
- Sandra Oh as Deborah "Debbie" Grayson
- J. K. Simmons as Nolan Grayson / Omni-Man

=== Recurring ===
- Gillian Jacobs as Samantha Eve Wilkons / Atom Eve
- Andrew Rannells as William Francis Clockwell
- Walton Goggins as Cecil Stedman
- Chris Diamantopoulos as Donald Ferguson / Doc Seismic
- Zachary Quinto as Rudy Conners / Robot
- Ross Marquand as Rudy Connors (clone), The Immortal, Aquarus, Kursk
- Jason Mantzoukas as Rex Sloan / Rex Splode
- Malese Jow as Kate Cha / Dupli-Kate
- Grey Griffin as Amanda / Monster Girl, Rachel / Shrinking Rae
- Kevin Michael Richardson as Mauler Twins, Amanda / Monster Girl (monster)
- Khary Payton as Markus Grimshaw / Black Samson, various others
- Mark Hamill as Arthur "Art" Rosenbaum
- Clancy Brown as Damien Darkblood
- Zazie Beetz as Amber Justine Bennett

=== Guest ===
- Seth Rogen as Allen the Alien
- Jonathan Groff as Rick Sheridan
- Michael Dorn as Battle Beast
- Mahershala Ali as Titan
- Nicole Byer as Vanessa, Fiona
- Jeffrey Donovan as Machine Head
- Ezra Miller as D.A Sinclair
- Justin Roiland as Doug Cheston
- Jon Hamm as Steve
- Max Burkholder as Matt
- Mae Whitman as Connie
- Djimon Hounsou as Martian Emperor, Flaxan Leader (uncredited)
- Reginald VelJohnson as Principal Winslow
- Fred Tatasciore as Killcannon
- Sean Patrick Thomas as Guard #2
- Gary Anthony Williams as Newscaster
- Zehra Fazal as Additional voices
- Lauren Cohan as War Woman
- Michael Cudlitz as Red Rush
- Chad L. Coleman as Martian Man
- Lennie James as Darkwing
- Sonequa Martin-Green as Green Ghost

== Production ==
=== Development ===
On August 11, 2017, Kirkman, with his company Skybound Entertainment, signed a deal with Amazon to develop various series for Amazon Prime Video. However, it was revealed that series that were already in production or development with other studios, would not be developed for Amazon. Kirkman revealed that he was interested on developing a series of the Invincible comic series, but that would not be possible at the moment because Universal was developing a film based on the comic series.

However, on June 19, 2018, it was announced that Amazon had given a series order to the project for a first season consisting of eight episodes. It was also revealed that the series would be animated and its episodes would be hour-long.

=== Casting ===
On January 31, 2019, the cast of the series was revealed, with Steven Yeun to portray Mark Grayson / Invincible, J. K. Simmons portraying Nolan Grayson / Omni-Man; Sandra Oh, Mark Hamill, Seth Rogen, Gillian Jacobs, Andrew Rannells, Zazie Beetz, Walton Goggins, Jason Mantzoukas, Mae Whitman, Chris Diamantopoulos, Malese Jow, Kevin Michael Richardson, Grey Griffin and Max Burkholder also joining the cast of the series. On July 18, 2020, Kirkman confirmed the casting in a live video on Twitter.

Due to Yeun and Oh both being of Korean descent, Oh's character Debbie Grayson was made to be Korean American in the animated adaptation, with her son Mark Grayson being half-Korean. Their Korean identity is not directly mentioned in the show, but a painting featuring Hangul text that reads 안녕 (annyeong; 'hello') is shown in the Grayson home. The decision came from a desire to increase diverse representations in the series. Similarly, Amber Bennett, Mark's ex-girlfriend, was made an African American teenager in the adaptation. Originally closeted before coming out midway through the series comic run, the character of William Clockwell, Mark's best friend, is instead made openly gay from the start of the series.

=== Animation ===
When the show was confirmed to be animated, it was confirmed that Wind Sun Sky Entertainment and its partner company, Skybound North, would be animating and co-producing the series.

The series title sequence is recognized by appearing right where a character would have said "Invincible", typically the first instance in each episode. Throughout the first season, the title sequence also becomes bloodier with each episode. Kirkman revealed that he wanted to represent the dark days that lay ahead by using the increasingly bloody title cards. Racioppa revealed that he wanted each episode to be different from the previous ones to convince the audience to not skip it. The animation style borrows from the look of Saturday morning cartoons from the early 2000s, and has also been noted for its anime-like visuals and aesthetics.

== Release ==
On January 22, 2021, during a livestream celebrating the 18th anniversary of the first issue of Invincible, Kirkman revealed that the series would debut on March 25, 2021 (midnight EST), with the first 3 episodes. The remaining episodes would release weekly thereafter.

== Reception ==
=== Critical response ===
On the review aggregator website Rotten Tomatoes, the first season of Invincible has a 98% approval rating, based on 88 critic reviews, with an average rating of 8.6/10. The site's consensus reads: "With bold animation, bloody action, and an all-star cast led by the charming Steven Yeun, Invincible smartly adapts its source material without sacrificing its nuanced perspective on the price of superpowers." Metacritic reported a score of 73 out of 100 based on 16 critics, indicating "generally favorable reviews" for the first season.

Ben Travers of IndieWire gave the show a B rating, stating that "Kirkman's adaptation is provocative, surprising, and sometimes challenging, as it constantly tries to disrupt the accepted ideas of its genre, whether that's the superhero genre, the teen drama genre, or the misguided notion that animation is a genre unto itself." Kathryn VanArendonk of Vulture stated that "the series has a palpable 'more of an eight-hour movie' thing going on, and the potential of that model is that it will all coalesce in the end into this glorious, big, transfixing story" but also adds that "the pitfall is that it makes these opening episodes a little weaker; there are so many characters happening here, so many story threads to put in place, that it's hard to know what to invest in as a viewer." Caroline Framke from Variety commented: "Now, of course, Kirkman is the wildly successful co-creator and executive producer of 'The Walking Dead,' so even those who might not have picked up an 'Invincible' comic might be interested in this spry, hourlong animated series that somehow manages to be both snarky and earnest within the same breath." William Hughes from The A.V. Club praised the series for its animation and stated: "Funny, exciting, and emotionally smart—seriously, Sandra Oh is killing it here—Invincible isn't bulletproof. But, like its increasingly burdened hero, it's trying. And sometimes, in the superhero game, that's all you can really do." Bob Strauss from Datebook praised the show, commenting: "While you can't describe 'Invincible' as gritty, it does feel like the right kind of animated super-show for an era marked by Zack Snyder's dark-hued 'Justice League' reconstruction and Amazon's own, ultra-pathological take on the genre, 'The Boys.' It's as clean-looking as any program we grew up with, but it has the dirtier stuff we secretly wanted."

Siddhant Adlakha of IGN gave the first season an 8 out of 10, stating the season "is great, thanks to its unique action and strong character-centric gravitas" and that the show "combines familiar superhero tropes with unexpected gore and moving character dynamics, resulting in the year's most surprising superhero series." Alan Sepinwall from Rolling Stone stated: "As the series moves along, Kirkman and company begin introducing twists to what we think is the formula — perhaps too many. Even within three episodes, the number of reversals and secrets pile so high that it can be hard to invest in certain characters and scenes, rather than trying to guess what will come next." Roxana Hadadi from RogerEbert.com praised the series for its story and animation, commenting: "'Invincible' sets up those questions quickly and engagingly in these first three installments, wraps them in a mystery, and then splatters them with blood. It's not an entirely new approach for this genre, but the familiarity of 'Invincible' is forgivable in light of the confidence that both Kirkman and Yeun bring to the material. They're the reason to watch." Niv M. Sultan from Slant Magazine gave the first season 3.5 stars of 4, and commented, "Invincible recaptures what our current glut of superhero fiction largely loses sight of: the pleasure that superheroes must feel when wielding their powers. Not the sacred satisfaction of helping the downtrodden, but the id-centered thrills of soaring through the sky and inflicting hurt on those deemed deserving." Louis Chilton from The Independent gave the series 3 stars of 5 and stated, "Invincible often seems derivative; perhaps its ideas were more groundbreaking in the original early-2000s comics. Some of its characters are unapologetic parodies (the Batman facsimile "Darkwing", for example), and you could easily go through picking out elements or story ideas that have cropped up in Watchmen, or The Incredibles, or Sky High, or Misfits. But there are still some good bones to its premise, and just enough subversiveness to let you ignore the fact this is a story you've seen a hundred times before."

=== Accolades ===
Invincible was nominated for Best Animated Series or Animated Television Movie at the Hollywood Critics Association TV Awards, and for Best Animated Show at the Dorian TV Awards.
