= LeVar Burton filmography =

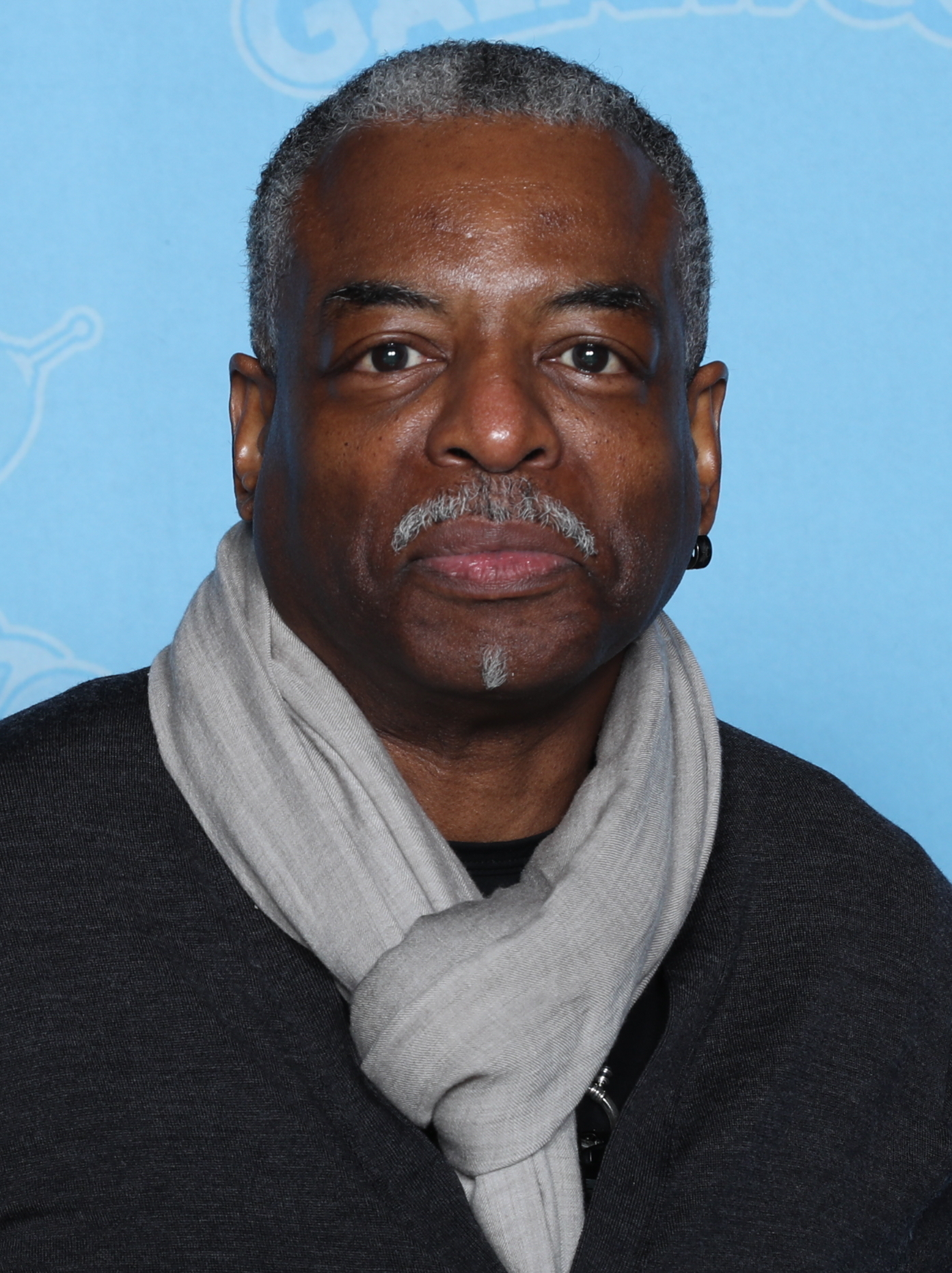
Burton at the 2020 GalaxyCon Richmond

The following is a partial filmography for LeVar Burton, separated into film and television work.

== Filmography ==
=== Film ===
| Year | Film | Role | Note |
|---|---|---|---|
| 1977 | Looking for Mr. Goodbar | Cap Jackson | |
| 1980 | The Hunter | Tommy Price | |
| 1986 | The Supernaturals | Private Michael Osgood | |
| 1994 | Star Trek Generations | Lt. Commander Geordi La Forge | |
| 1996 | Star Trek: First Contact | Lt. Commander Geordi La Forge | |
| 1998 | Star Trek: Insurrection | Lt. Commander Geordi La Forge | |
| 1999 | Our Friend, Martin | Martin Luther King Jr. (age 26) | Voice |
| 2000 | Dancing in September | Himself | |
| 2001 | Ali | Martin Luther King Jr. | |
| 2002 | Star Trek: Nemesis | Lt. Commander Geordi La Forge | |
| 2003 | Blizzard | Night Watchman Elf | Also director |
| 2008 | Reach for Me | Nathaniel | |
| 2009 | Superman/Batman: Public Enemies | Jefferson Pierce/Black Lightning | Voice, direct-to-video |
| 2011 | And They're Off | Himself | |
| 2015 | Practice Makes Perfect | Principal Healy | Short |
| 2018 | In Saturn's Rings | Narrator | Documentary |
| 2020 | Definition Please | Himself | |
| 2024 | The Imaginary | The Old Dog | Voice, English dub |
| 2024 | Butterfly in the Sky | Himself | Documentary |
| 2026 | One Night Only | Rick | |

=== Television ===
| Year | Work | Role | Note |
|---|---|---|---|
| 1977 | Roots | Kunta Kinte | TV miniseries |
| 1977 | Almos' a Man | Dave | Television film; alternative title: Richard Wright's Almos' a Man |
| 1977 | Billy: Portrait of a Street Kid | Billy Peoples | Television film |
| 1978 | California Jam II | Himself | TV special (interviewed as guest attendee) |
| 1978 | One in a Million: The Ron LeFlore Story | Ron LeFlore | Television film; alternative title: The Man of Passion |
| 1978 | Battered | Andrew Sinclair | Television film |
| 1978–1979 | Rebop | Host | 26 episodes |
| 1979 | Dummy | Donald Lang | Television film |
| 1980 | Guyana Tragedy: The Story of Jim Jones | Richard Jefferson | TV miniseries |
| 1981 | The Acorn People | Rodney | Television film |
| 1981 | Grambling's White Tiger | Charles 'Tank' Smith | Television film |
| 1982 | Trapper John, M.D. | Luther Peacock | Episode: "A Piece of the Action" |
| 1983 | Fantasy Island | Edward Ross Jr. | Episode: "Edward/The Extraordinary Miss Jones" |
| 1983 | Emergency Room | Ray Walden | Television film |
| 1983–2006 | Reading Rainbow | Host | 155 episodes |
| 1984 | The Love Boat | Darnell | Episode: "Love is Blind" |
| 1984 | The Jesse Owens Story | Professor Preston | Television film |
| 1984 | Booker | Davis | Television film |
| 1985 | And the Children Shall Lead | Glenn Scott | Television film; alternative title: PBS Wonderworks: And The Children Shall Lead |
| 1985 | The Midnight Hour | Vinnie Davis | Television film; alternative title: In The Midnight Hour |
| 1986 | Liberty | Robert Johnson | Television film |
| 1987 | Murder, She Wrote | Reporter Dave Robinson | Episode: "Death Take a Dive" |
| 1987 | A Special Friendship | Ben Summer | Television film |
| 1987 | Houston Knights | Jason Evans | Episode: "Bad Girl" |
| 1987–1994 | Star Trek: The Next Generation | Lt. Commander Geordi La Forge | 178 episodes |
| 1990–1996 | Captain Planet and the Planeteers | Kwame | Voice, 113 episodes |
| 1988 | Roots: The Gift | Kunta Kinte | Television film; alternative title: A Roots Christmas: Kunta Kinte's Gift |
| 1993 | Firestorm: 72 Hours in Oakland | Fire Chief J. Alan Mathers | Television film; alternative title: Firestorm: A Catastrophe In Oakland |
| 1993 | Batman: The Animated Series | Hayden Sloane | Voice, episode: "The Worry Men" |
| 1993–1999 | PTV | Pernell | Voice |
| 1994 | Parallel Lives | Dr. Franklin Carter | Television film |
| 1995 | Christy | Daniel Scott | 7 episodes |
| 1995 | Deadly Games | Mr. Metcalf | Episode: "The Boss" |
| 1995 | Happily Ever After: Fairy Tales for Every Child | Monk | Voice, episode: "The Frog Prince" |
| 1996 | Gargoyles | Anansi | Voice, episode: "Mark of the Panther" |
| 1996 | Yesterday's Target | Winstrom | Television film |
| 1997 | Pinky and the Brain | Murray | Voice, episode: "The Real Life" |
| 1998 | Star Trek: Voyager | Captain Geordi LaForge | Episode: "Timeless" |
| 1998 | Mister Rogers' Neighborhood | Himself | Episode: "1725 - Mister Rogers Talks About Giving and Receiving" |
| 2000 | Becker | Mr. Haller | Episode: "Beckerethics" |
| 2003 | Boomtown | Marvin Lloyd | Episode: "The Hole-in-the-Wall Gang" |
| 2005, 2009 | Family Guy | Vern, himself | Voice, 2 episodes |
| 2009 | The Super Hero Squad Show | War Machine | Voice, episode: "Tales of Suspense!" |
| 2009 | Taken in Broad Daylight | Mike Timbrook | Television film |
| 2010 | Tim and Eric Awesome Show, Great Job! | Ghost of LeVar Burton | Episode: "Greene Machine" |
| 2010 | The Jensen Project | Kendrick James | Television film (brokered programming from Procter & Gamble/Walmart) |
| 2011, 2014 | Community | Himself | 2 episodes |
| 2011, 2012, 2014 | The Big Bang Theory | Himself | 3 episodes |
| 2012 | Face Off | Himself | Episode: "Alien Interpreters" |
| 2012 | Rise of the Zombies | Dr. Dan Halpern | Television film |
| 2012–2016 | Transformers: Rescue Bots | Doc Greene, additional voices | Voice, 26 episodes |
| 2012–2015 | Perception | Paul Haley | 30 episodes |
| 2013 | Adventure Time | Bubble | Voice, episode: "BMO Lost" |
| 2014 | Hell's Kitchen | Himself | Episode: "5 Chefs Compete" |
| 2016 | Roots | Ephraim | Episode: "Part 1" |
| 2016 | Miles from Tomorrowland | Dr. Consilium | Voice, episode: "The First Day of Galactic School" |
| 2017 | OK K.O.! Let's Be Heroes | Kwame | Voice, episode: "The Power Is Yours!" |
| 2018 | Explained | Himself (narrator) | Episode: "Extraterrestrial Life" |
| 2018 | NCIS: New Orleans | Rufus Nero | Episode: "X" |
| 2019 | Weird City | Dr. Negari | Episode: "The One" |
| 2020 | The Eric Andre Show | Himself | Episode: "The ASAP Ferg Show" |
| 2021 | Jeopardy! | Himself (guest host) | 5 episodes, Season 37 |
| 2021 | Nancy Drew | Barclay | Voice, episode: "The Celestial Visitor" |
| 2021 | Leverage: Redemption | Mr. Blanche | Episode: "The Bucket Job" |
| 2022 | 94th Scripps National Spelling Bee | Host | TV special |
| 2022 | Tom Swift | Barclay | Voice, recurring role |
| 2023 | Star Trek: Picard | Commodore Geordi LaForge | 5 episodes |
| 2023 | The Ready Room | Himself | Episode: "The Bounty" |
| 2023 | Blindspotting | Marvin Sulaiman | 2 episodes |
| 2023 | Carol & the End of the World | | NASA worker, voice, episode: "Beetle Broach" |
| 2024 | Clipped | Himself | Episode: "White Party" |
| 2024 | Futurama | LeVar Burton's Unlicensed Hologram | Voice, episode: "The Futurama Mystery Liberry" |
| 2024–present | Trivial Pursuit | Host | 43 episodes |
| 2024 | The Legend of Vox Machina | Undead Thordak | Voice, 2 episodes |
| 2025–present | Weather Hunters | Wallace Hunter, Wallace's Gadgets | Voice, main cast |
| 2026 | Invincible | Tech Jacket Suit AI | Voice, episode: "Give Us A Moment" |

=== Video games ===
| Year | Work | Role | Note |
|---|---|---|---|
| 1995 | Star Trek: The Next Generation – A Final Unity | Geordi La Forge | |
| 2010 | Star Trek Online | Geordi La Forge | |

=== Other work ===
| Year | Work | Role | Note |
|---|---|---|---|
| 1986 | "Word Up!" | Detective | Music video by the funk group Cameo |
| 2014 | "Rooster Teeth's Extra Life 24 Hour Livestream" | Himself | Read "Go The F*ck To Sleep" for RT staff and viewers after reaching a donation milestone |

=== Director ===
| Year | Work | Note |
|---|---|---|
| 1987–1994 | Star Trek: The Next Generation | 2 episodes |
| 1993–1999 | Star Trek: Deep Space Nine | 10 episodes |
| 1995–2001 | Star Trek: Voyager | 8 episodes |
| 1998 | The Tiger Woods Story | Television film; alternative title: Son, Hero, and Champion |
| 1998–2006 | Charmed | 3 episodes |
| 1999 | Smart House | Television film |
| 2000–2004 | Soul Food | 2 episodes |
| 2001–2005 | Star Trek: Enterprise | 9 episodes |
| 2003 | Blizzard | Film |
| 2003 | JAG | Episode: "Pulse Rate" |
| 2005 | Miracle's Boys | Episode: "Free Day" |
| 2006 | Las Vegas | Episode: "Meatball Montecito" |
| 2008 | Reach for Me | Film |
| 2014 | Perception | 2 episodes |
| 2017–2021 | NCIS: New Orleans | 10 episodes |
| 2017 | Scorpion | Episode: "A Christmas Car-Roll" |
| 2022–2024 | NCIS: Hawaii | 5 episodes |
