= We Need to Talk =

We Need to Talk may refer to:

- We Need to Talk (Tayla Parx album), 2019
- We Need to Talk (Keri Hilson album), 2025
- We Need to Talk (film), a 2016 Spanish film
- "We Need to Talk" (Steven Universe), a 2015 episode of Steven Universe
- "We Need to Talk" (Invincible), a 2021 episode of Invincible
