= Viltrum Empire =

Fictional state in the Invincible series universe

- Image Universe organization
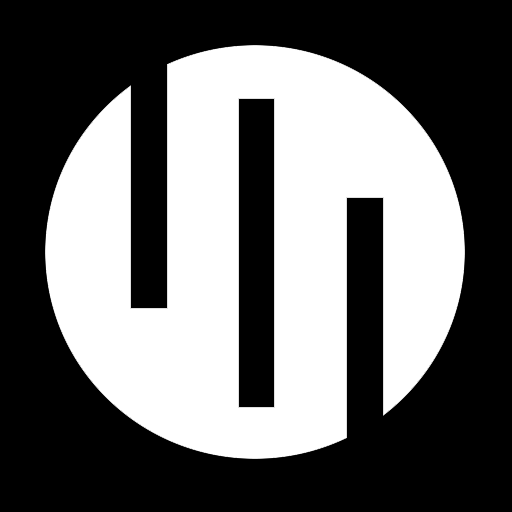
- The Viltrumite symbol, as seen in Invincible
- First appearance: Invincible #2 (February 2003)
- Created by: Robert Kirkman; Cory Walker; Ryan Ottley

In-universe information
- Type: Intergalactic empire
- Founder: Emperor Argall
- Location: New Viltrum; Earth (formerly); Viltrum (formerly)
- Leader: Current: Emperor Mark Grayson; Former: Emperor Nolan Grayson †; Grand Regent Thragg †; Emperor Argall †
- Purpose: Galactic expansion and domination
- Affiliations: Coalition of Planets; Viltrumites
- Enemies: Global Defense Agency; Guardians of the Globe; Alien Races: Rognarrs; Humans; Thraxans; Unopans; Flaxans; Gelderians; Dornians; Aikreonians; Martin clune; Traitors: Thaedus (deserted/deceased); Nolan Grayson; Others: Battle Beast; Space Racer; Captain Pikell; Tech Jacket; Atom Eve

The Viltrum Empire is a fictional galactic empire and the primary antagonistic force in the Invincible comic series and its animated adaptation, created by Robert Kirkman with artists Cory Walker and Ryan Ottley. Founded by the Viltrumites, a genetically advanced humanoid race known for their immense strength, flight, and near-invulnerability, their mission is to conquer and dominate other planets.

The Viltrum Empire was first mentioned in Invincible #2, published in February 2003, and appeared when Omni-Man (Nolan Grayson) reveals to his son, Mark Grayson (Invincible), his origins. He describes the Viltrumites as a powerful and peacemaking alien race from the planet Viltrum, intent on improving the universe, including Earth. This was later revealed to be a lie, as the Viltrumites were in actuality violent warmongers, intent on dominating the universe.

Following the death of Emperor Argall at the hands of Thaedus, the empire fell into internal conflict, culminating in a brutal event later known as the Great Purge, during which weaker members of the population were killed. Although this reduced their numbers by nearly half, the surviving Viltrumites rebuilt their society and expanded outward, establishing control over numerous worlds for centuries. Their dominance was eventually weakened by the Scourge Virus, a biological weapon that caused catastrophic losses and left only a small fraction of the population alive. After Argall’s death, Thragg was appointed Grand Regent and charged with maintaining the empire’s stability, concealing the true extent of their decline, and identifying a suitable heir, all while navigating ongoing hostilities with the Coalition of Planets, with Thragg becoming opposed to the rest of the remaining Viltrumites on learning Argall's heirs to be Nolan and Mark Grayson.

Viltrum, the homeworld of this warlike alien race, is the origin of key characters like Omni-Man, Conquest, Thragg, and Anissa, who are central to the empire’s expansion and enforcement.

== Origins and culture ==
The Viltrum Empire is the political and military body governing the Viltrumites, exercising authority over their homeworld and its population, which once numbered over three billion. Its ruler, bearing the title of Emperor, held supreme authority over the planet; among them was Argall, who ruled as emperor until his death.

In its early development, Viltrum experienced a period of internal upheaval marked by widespread conflict. During this time, individuals deemed weak were deliberately purged, resulting in a significantly reduced but more formidable population.

=== Viltrumite ===
The Viltrumites are a genetically engineered humanoid species from the planet Viltrum, developed for superhuman strength, stamina, survivability, and longevity. Their abilities stem from a centuries-long eugenics program and advanced genetic manipulation, often called a "global transhumanism" due to intentional enhancements and selective breeding, granting them near-invulnerability, flight, and lifespans of millennia. Their society once adhered to a strict Darwinian philosophy, purging the weak to strengthen the race, a principle set by their former ruler Argall and later upheld by Thragg, the strongest Viltrumite. The empire grew through conquest, with Viltrumites infiltrating and dominating other civilizations to integrate them into their rule.

In their planet’s history, the assassination of Emperor Argall sparked a brutal civil war. The aftermath involved a violent campaign, known as the Great Purge, which killed about half the population to eliminate the weak, leaving only the strongest Viltrumites. This was presented as a step to rebuild a "perfect civilization," marking Viltrum’s shift into a militant empire.

Invincible (Mark Grayson), upon becoming Emperor of the Viltrumite Empire.

After the purge, the surviving Viltrumites, under leaders like Thragg, consolidated power and pursued galactic conquest. Their strategy blended diplomatic control, offering technology and stability, with military force against resistance, aiming to unify the galaxy under Viltrum’s rule.

=== Scourge virus and decline ===
The Scourge virus was a bioweapon created by Thaedus and the Coalition of Planets to halt the expansion of the Viltrumite Empire. The virus, based on Thaedus’s own genetic material, killed approximately 99.9% of Viltrumites by either direct infection or weakening their natural strength and durability. Fewer than fifty adults survived, leaving the empire critically weakened.

In response to near-extinction, the Viltrumites initiated a program to test cross-species reproduction. Nolan Grayson was sent to Earth to determine whether humans could produce viable Viltrumite offspring, where he met Debbie Grayson, resulting in the birth of Mark Grayson, the future Emperor of the empire. Earth thus became central to the survival of the Viltrumite species. After Mark becomes Emperor, he puts an end to all other planetary governments, going to war with the Coalition of Planets.

== Appearances (chronological) ==
Volume	Title	Note	Collected material
Invincible
1	Early issues	The Empire is not directly shown, but its existence is implied through the actions and revelations surrounding Omni-Man (Nolan Grayson). His true mission on Earth establishes the Viltrumites as an imperial power engaged in planetary infiltration and eventual conquest.	Invincible #1–#7 ISBN 978-1534399952
2	Mid-series developments	The Empire becomes more clearly defined as additional Viltrumites are introduced. Their hierarchy, ideology, and methods of expansion are explored, emphasizing their role as a dominant interstellar force.	Invincible #11–#30 ISBN 978-1534328037
3	Viltrumite War arc	The Empire takes a central role during the Viltrumite War, a major conflict between Viltrumite forces and a coalition of opposing groups. This storyline reveals the reduced population of Viltrumites following the effects of the Scourge Virus and highlights their continued ambition to rebuild and expand.	Invincible #71–#78 ISBN 9781607063674
4	Post-war period	Following the war, the Empire undergoes structural and ideological changes. Its leadership and long-term goals evolve, with increased focus on survival, repopulation, and consolidation of power.	Invincible #79–#120
5	Final arc	The Empire remains a key force in the concluding stages of the series. Its influence persists as characters confront the long-term consequences of Viltrumite expansion and authority, culminating in a redefinition of its role in the galaxy.	Invincible #121–#144
6	Animated adaptation	In the television series Invincible, the Viltrumite Empire is introduced in the first season through Omni-Man’s storyline. Subsequent seasons expand on its structure, history, and broader presence, closely following the progression established in the comics.	Invincible, 2021–

== Notable members ==
Character	Voiced by
Mark Grayson Invincible	Steven Yeun in the 2021 television series Patrick Cavanaugh in the 2008 motion comic series
Nolan Grayson Omni-Man	J. K. Simmons
Grand Regent Thragg	Lee Pace
Conquest	Jeffrey Dean Morgan
Emperor Argall	Frank Welker
Oliver Grayson	Christian Convery
Terra Grayson	Not yet appeared
Markus Murphy	Not yet appeared
Thaedus	Peter Cullen
General Kregg	Clancy Brown
Thula	Grey DeLisle
Anissa	Shantel VanSanten
Lucan	Phil LaMarr
Kradd	Andrew Morgado
