= Debbie Grayson =

Image Comics fictional character

- Debbie Grayson in Invincible TV series

Publication information
- Publisher: Image Comics
- First appearance: Invincible #1 (January 2003)
- Created by: Robert Kirkman; Cory Walker
- Voiced by: Sandra Oh

In-story information
- Full name: Deborah Grayson
- Species: Human
- Place of origin: Earth
- Team affiliations: Grayson family
- Partnerships: Omni-Man (husband)
- Supporting character of: Invincible (son)
- Abilities: None

Deborah "Debbie" Grayson is a fictional character in the Invincible comic-book series by Image Comics and its adaptation into a television series of the same name on Prime Video. The character plays a central role in both versions as the human wife of Nolan Grayson (aka Omni‑Man), mother to Mark Grayson and the stepmother of Oliver Grayson II. In the series, Debbie Grayson is voiced by Sandra Oh.

== Publication/appearances history ==
Debbie Grayson first appears in Invincible #1 (2003), created by Robert Kirkman and Cory Walker.

In the series, she first appears in the first episode of the first season (2021) and is then present in most episodes of the four seasons; the character is announced in the fifth season.

== Fictional character biography ==
Deborah Grayson meets Nolan Grayson, who operates on Earth as the superhero Omni-Man, when he saves her life during one of his early missions in the early 1980s; she marries him knowing about his alien heritage and they made their home on Earth.

Debbie later becomes pregnant with their son, Mark Grayson, who would inherit his father's Viltrumite abilities and eventually become the superhero known as Invincible. During her pregnancy, Debbie is unaware of the true implications of Viltrumite-human reproduction. Nolan reassures her that their child will be healthy and strong but conceals the real Viltrumite intentions for Earth.

Mark's birth marks a significant change in Debbie's life. Because of Nolan's frequent absences, Debbie largely raised Mark on her own, supporting his teenage growth. Despite Nolan's growing secrecy, Debbie remains the family's emotional anchor—although she grows suspicious of Nolan's hidden truths about his missions and motives until her husband's betrayal comes to light years later.

The relationship shifts when Debbie notices inconsistencies in Nolan's behavior, especially after the brutal murder of the Guardians of the Globe. Her suspicions deepens upon finding a blood-stained superhero costume at home. Her probe into Nolan's secrets reveals he killed the Guardians and was part of the Viltrumite Empire's plan to conquer Earth.

Nolan's betrayal leaves Debbie devastated, realizing her marriage was largely deceptive. After Nolan's confession and violent clash with Mark, she grapples with alcoholism and grief but resists being fully broken. Eventually, she rebuilds her life, taking a real estate job and focusing on supporting Mark's development as a superhero.

== Reception ==
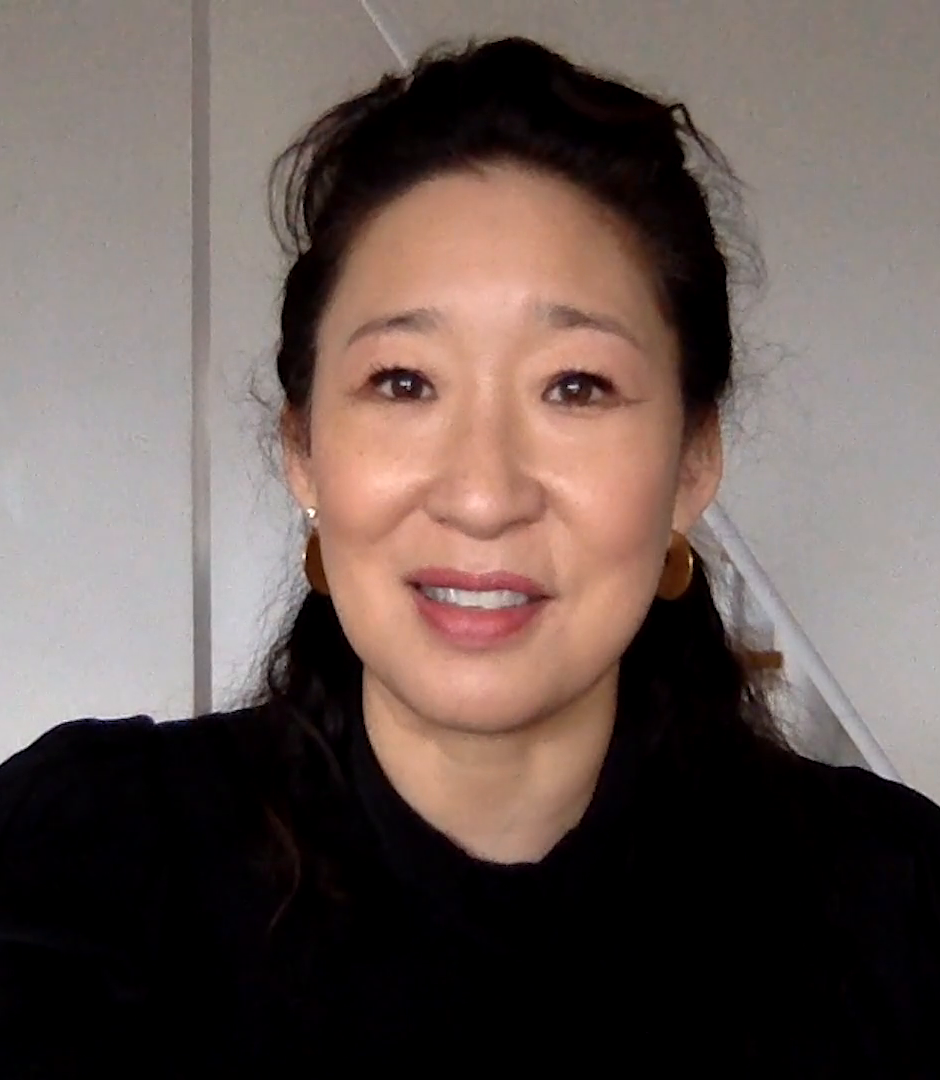
Sandra Oh, who portrays the character in the Amazon Prime series, in 2021.

TV Guide hailed Debbie as "the true heart of Invincible," highlighting her emotional complexity in Season 2. Her arc is noted for symbolic power and relatable humanity, as she reconciles trauma and self-reinvention after betrayal. In The Mary Sue, Charlotte Simmons wrote: "We all know it already, so it's time to say it: Debbie Grayson is the true MPP (most powerful player) of Invincible." Stacey Henley, of The Gamer, called her "the true hero of Invincible." Sandra Oh, who voices the character in the series, stated that, according to her, Debbie was characterised by her sense of responsibility; the Sydney Morning Herald found that Debbie Grayson could be the actress's "most complicated character yet".

Comparing Debbie Grayson's portrayal in the comics and the animated series, Nischal Niraula of Collider observed that "as opposed to her more passive self in the comics, Debbie evolves into an active and strong character in the show." Similarly, Collider writer Collier Jennings noted that her character development was among the most significant improvements introduced by the adaptation. Sam Stone of CBR described Debbie as "Omni-Man's weakness" and highlighted the contrast between the two versions of the character, explaining that in the comics, she is largely unaware of her husband's true nature and is completely shocked when his role in the murder of the Guardians of the Globe is revealed. Stone added that, although the animated series retains many of her key emotional moments such as overhearing Nolan refer to her as a mere "pet" and descending into heartbreak and alcoholism, Debbie is portrayed as a more perceptive and resilient character who does not fully fall for Nolan's deception early in the story.

Regarding her ethnicity and the choice of Oh to voice the character, Tyler Llewyn Taing noted in Polygon: "In Kirkman's comics, Mark and his mother Debbie never had specified racial identities. But in the animated version, Steven Yeun and Sandra Oh were cast to voice them. Using actors of Korean descent for the roles may seem like a subtle change, particularly since the characters' designs haven't changed much from the comic to match the new interpretation. But the idea of Mark as the child of two immigrants emphasizes Kirkman's themes, and creates a perfect case for the value of racebending through subtext that now feels indispensable to the TV series."
