= Omni-Man =

Fictional character from Image Comics

- Art of Omni-Man from The Official Handbook of the Invincible Universe, by Ryan Ottley and Bill Crabtree

Publication information
- Publisher: Image Comics
- First appearance: Invincible #1 (January 2003)
- Created by: Robert Kirkman; Cory Walker
- Voiced by: Pete Sepenuk (motion comic); J. K. Simmons (television series, Mortal Kombat 1, Invincible VS); Talon Warburton (young; television series)

In-story information
- Alter ego: Nolan (birth name, pronounced "Nowl-Ahn"); Nolan Grayson (adopted Earth name)
- Species: Viltrumite
- Place of origin: Viltrum
- Team affiliations: Guardians of the Globe; Viltrum Empire and Coalition of planets.
- Partnerships: Debbie Grayson (first wife); Andressa (second wife)
- Notable aliases: Nolan Grayson; The Azure Avenger; Defender of Democracy
- Abilities: Superhuman strength, speed, senses, stamina, agility, and endurance; Invulnerability; Flight; Longevity; Accelerated healing factor; Master Hand-to-hand combatant; Master infiltrator and sabatour; Skilled novelist

Omni-Man (Nolan Grayson) is a character in American comic books published by Image Comics. He was created by writer Robert Kirkman and artist Cory Walker (with Ryan Ottley). Omni-Man is the father of Invincible / Mark Grayson and Oliver Grayson, and a member of the alien Viltrumite race, working as a superhero on Earth. Omni-Man is a main character in Invincible, and has made cameo appearances in Supreme, Noble Causes, and Dynamo 5.

In the Invincible television series and the video games Invincible: Guarding the Globe, Mortal Kombat 1, and Invincible VS, Omni-Man is voiced by J. K. Simmons.

== Publication history ==
Robert Kirkman introduced Omni-Man as the father of the titular character in his comic series Invincible (January 2003 – February 2018), designed by Cory Walker and Ryan Ottley as a black-haired, mustachioed man.

== Fictional character biography ==
=== Invincible ===
Omni-Man first arrived on Earth in the 1980s, where he eventually adopted the secret identity of a best-selling author named Nolan Grayson. He married Debbie, whose life he had saved, and they had a son together named Mark Grayson. In issue number 7, Nolan lures Earth's premiere superhero team, the Guardians of the Globe, to their hideout in Utah, where he brutally murders all the members. It was later revealed that the Immortal, the Guardians' leader, had been resurrected by the supervillain duo the Mauler Twins in an attempt to brainwash and control him. Remembering Omni-Man's betrayal, Immortal tracked down Nolan and battled him in public, outing him as the murderer and villain he truly is before being killed yet again. Nolan reveals that he was sent to Earth as a conqueror for the Viltrum Empire, a revelation that was in stark contrast to his previous claims that his presence was to advance human technology and protect the Earth from extraterrestrial dangers. In a confrontation shortly thereafter, Omni-Man beats Mark to within an inch of his life, yet he refuses to kill him before he leaves the planet.

It was further revealed that Nolan had found a new planet called Thraxa to rule over, in the hopes of offsetting some of the consequences of his earthly failure. Nolan's rise to power, however, was entirely peaceful. The custom of the native inhabitants, a race of mantis-like aliens, dubbed the Thraxans (an insectoid species who live entirely within a nine-month span), was to simply choose the oldest among them to act as their leader. As on Earth, Nolan has taken a native wife, Andressa, and sired a second son, Oliver (who subsequently begins to use the codename "Kid Omni-Man" when he accompanies Invincible back to Earth). The genetic differences between Viltrumites and the mantis-people were more apparent, though, than they were with humans. This causes Oliver to age slower than his mother's species, but much faster than his father's.

Omni-Man's attempts to appease the Viltrum Empire failed with his defeat and capture at the hands of his own people. He was held captive in prison until the Empire was able to send the required Viltrumite executioners. His parting words to Mark were "Read my books, Mark. My books..." In a conversation with his tailor Art Rosenbaum, Mark learns that the books Nolan referred to were not his well-known travel books, but a series of failed science fiction "novels". While Art suspected that the stories were Viltrumite folklore, Mark quickly realized that they were accounts of Nolan's own missions to destroy potential threats to the Viltrum Empire, which could provide the secrets to defeating the Viltrumites.

He is later saved on the day of his execution by Allen the Alien, to whom he agrees to reveal the "secret": Viltrumites are a near-extinct race, with fewer than fifty pure-blood able individuals left. Emboldened by the incredible strength shown by his new ally, he begins a two-man campaign to eradicate Viltrum's supremacy. Embarking on adventures across the galaxy, they gather weapons and allies which will give them an advantage over the Viltrumites, before returning to Earth to collect Mark and Oliver. They are briefly waylaid by the Viltrumite champion Conquest, an old enemy of Invincible who is killed in the ensuing battle, but not before Mark is critically injured. Nolan spends the subsequent months bonding with Oliver while Mark heals.

In the final battle of the war, the anti-Viltrumite coalition is victorious, destroying the Viltrumite homeworld and scattering their enemies. Nolan is badly wounded by the Viltrumite regent Thragg, who secretly relocates the surviving members of his race on Earth, planning to interbreed with humans to covertly rebuild the empire. Tensions mount when Thragg discovers that Nolan is a descendant of the long-dead Viltrumite king, and thus heir to the throne, provoking a fierce battle between them. Although Nolan is overpowered, the Viltrumites recognize him and rally behind him, forcing Thragg to flee. Nolan is subsequently crowned ruler of the Viltrum Empire.

Nolan manages to oversee the Viltrumites on Earth and sees how the Viltrumites have changed for the better and see Earth as their new home. Nolan learns that Anissa raped Mark, and is saddened at Oliver's death. In the final confrontation between the Viltrumites and Thragg's army, Nolan is fatally wounded by Thragg. In his last words to Mark, Nolan names Mark as his successor to be the Emperor of the Viltrumites. In the future, his grandson (Marky) visits Nolan's grave and promises to live up to his father's legacy.

=== Dynamo 5 ===
In Dynamo 5: Sins of the Father, Omni-Man (alongside Captain Dynamo, Supreme, and Savage Dragon) defeats Dominex in combat thirty years before the series' events, in which Dominex's three sons seek to regain their family's honour (after their father had been spared from execution and sent him back to his home planet in shame) by fighting Invincible and the Dynamo 5.

== Powers and abilities ==
In addition to having all the generic powers and abilities of a Viltrumite, Omni-Man ranks among the most powerful Viltrumites to ever exist, physically stronger than most and a master combatant with centuries of experience. He ranks among the most powerful beings in the universe. He has superhuman strength, able to easily lift immense amounts of weight, tear through virtually any matter and only continues to gradually grow stronger the more he struggles and ages. He has super speed, able to close tremendous distances in seconds and likewise react to the fastest of opponents. He is nigh-invulnerable, immune to all forms of illness or contamination and able to withstand physical harm from all but the strongest of dangers. He has an enhanced healing factor, able to recover from all damage he does sustain, except the most grievous harm to his heart or brain, in anywhere from minutes to a single day depending on the level of harm, with no lingering side-effects. He has nigh-limitless stamina, able to continue his exertions for long periods of time with no effect on his performance and endure any damage he does sustain unhindered. He is also able to levitate and fly. While still needing air, Omni-Man can endure weeks holding his breath and likewise can survive the vacuum of space unprotected, allowing for unaided interstellar travel. Omni-Man possesses immense longevity. This stems from a decelerated aging process, gradually aging more slowly the older he gets, allowing him to retain his youthful health, vitality, conditioning, and appearance for an incalculably long time. At over two thousand years old, he has only begun to show signs of aging while still physically performing in his prime. Also as a Viltrumite, Omni-Man's genes are so potent that they can almost completely overshadow any genetic trait his offspring will inherit from the other parent, thus making said offspring almost purely Viltrumite themselves. However, as a Viltrumite, Omni-Man's ability of flight is aided by a delicate equilibrium in his inner ear, which can be disrupted by a specific frequency. This puts Omni-Man and any Viltrumite in crippling pain and prevents them from flying; it can even kill them if the frequency is played intensely and for a long time.

== In other media ==
=== Television ===
Omni-Man appears in the Invincible streaming television series, voiced by J. K. Simmons as an adult and by Talon Warburton as a young man. He has received positive critical reception, spawning several internet memes.

=== Video games ===
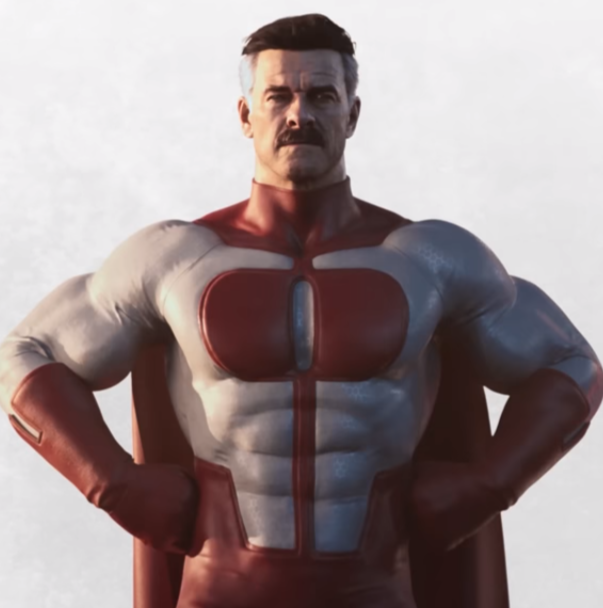
Omni-Man as he appears in Mortal Kombat 1

- Simmons later reprised his role as Omni-Man as a playable character in Mortal Kombat 1 via the "Kombat Pack" DLC, based on his appearance in the Invincible TV series. In his arcade mode ending, which takes place after the first season of Invincible, Omni-Man is pulled from his native timeline by Titan Shang Tsung to help him fight Fire God Liu Kang. However, Omni-Man betrays and kills Titan Shang Tsung before leading Viltrumite forces in conquering the realms to make up for abandoning Earth, with the understanding that he will have to return to Earth someday to complete his original mission.
- Omni-Man appears as a cosmetic outfit in Fortnite Battle Royale.
- Omni-Man appears as a playable character in the mobile game Invincible: Guarding the Globe.
- Omni-Man appears as a playable character in the fighting game Invincible VS, with Simmons reprising his role.

=== Miscellaneous ===
Omni-Man appears in the Death Battle episodes "Omni-Man VS Homelander (Invincible VS The Boys)" and "Omni-Man VS Bardock (Invincible VS Dragon Ball Z)", voiced by Tom Schalk, in which he fights and viciously beats Homelander and defeats Bardock from The Boys and Dragon Ball franchises respectively.

== Reception ==
Omni-Man was ranked as IGN's 93rd-greatest comic book hero/villain of all time. The website cited his charismatic moustache in its ranking.

The character has been compared to Superman, Vegeta from the Dragon Ball franchise, and Homelander from The Boys comic series and its TV adaptation.
