= Invincible (character) =

Image Comics superhero

- Invincible in his original costume; interior art of Invincible #79. Art by Ryan Ottley.

Publication information
- Publisher: Skybound Entertainment (Image Comics)
- First appearance: Savage Dragon #102 (Aug. 2002); (first preview in comics – 5-page Invincible preview; pre-dates Tech Jacket #1 and Masters of the Universe #1) Noble Causes: Family Secrets #3 (Nov. 2002); (cameo appearance – in variant cover and in one panel); Invincible #1 (Jan. 2003); (full appearance in own title)
- Created by: Robert Kirkman; Cory Walker
- Voiced by: Patrick Cavanaugh (motion comic); Steven Yeun (television series); Aleks Le (Invincible VS)

In-story information
- Full name: Markus Sebastian "Mark" Grayson
- Species: Viltrumite–human hybrid
- Place of origin: Earth
- Team affiliations: The Pact; Teen Team; Invincible Inc.; Guardians of the Globe
- Partnerships: Atom Eve (wife); Dinosaurus (ex-partner); Quantum Girl (ex-girlfriend); Amber Bennett (ex-girlfriend); Kid Omni-Man / Oliver Grayson (protege/partner/half-brother)
- Notable aliases: Invinciboy (by news media); Vince (by Zephyr Noble)
- Abilities: Superhuman strength, stamina, and speed; Nigh-invulnerability; Flight; Enhanced healing factor; Decelerated aging

Invincible (Markus Sebastian "Mark" Grayson) is a superhero created by writer Robert Kirkman and artist Cory Walker, currently drawn by Ryan Ottley. Invincible first appeared in a preview as part of Savage Dragon #102 (August 2002), before graduating to his own self-titled regular series in 2003, as the premier title in Image Comics' then-new superhero line, a relaunch of the Image Universe. Invincible appears in Invincible, Bomb Queen, Noble Causes, The Pact, Savage Dragon, The Astounding Wolf-Man, Dynamo 5, I Hate Fairyland — I Hate Image, and Battle Beast.

Born in 1987, Invincible is the son of Omni-Man, an extraterrestrial superhero of the Viltrumite race. Invincible inherited his father's complete array of superpowers and has sworn to protect the Earth. As a teenager, he had trouble adjusting to his newfound powers and coping with the reality of superhero work and his origins.

Invincible is voiced by Patrick Cavanaugh in the 2008 motion comic series, Steven Yeun in the 2021 television series, and Aleks Le in the 2026 video game Invincible VS.

== Fictional character biography ==
=== Noble Causes ===
In Noble Causes, Invincible is among those suspected of being the father of Zephyr Noble's baby, being confused to have been thought to be. Invincible later attends a party held at the Noble family mansion, and the funeral of Captain Dynamo.

=== Invincible ===
In Invincible, Mark Grayson was born to Nolan Grayson, a Viltrumite male and the superhero known as Omni-Man, and Debbie Grayson, a human female. After awakening his Viltrumite powers in Family Matters, Mark decides to live up to his father's legacy and become the superhero "Invincible", but soon after, discovers in Perfect Strangers that his father was lying to him as he was not an alien sent to protect Earth, but to conquer it and make it part of the Viltrum Empire instead. Despite Nolan's beating of Mark, and his pleas to join him, Mark refuses, leading to Nolan eventually turning against the Viltrum Empire to support his son, as Mark begins dedicating himself to protecting Earth from the Viltrumites, led by Grand Regent Thragg, among other threats, while dealing with his own personal issues as he enters adulthood. Eventually, Mark discovers that he and his father are the rightful heirs of the Viltrum Empire, as his grandfather, Emperor Argall, was its ruler before being assassinated. Joining with the reformed Nolan and his half-brother Oliver, otherwise known as Kid Omni-Man, Mark rallies the Viltrumites under their leadership against Thragg, culminating with Nolan and Thragg's deaths. Afterwards, Mark leaves Earth and becomes ruler of the Viltrum Empire, guiding his subjects into a new era of peace across the universe.

=== The Pact ===
In The Pact, set shortly after Mark's breakup with Amber, he is among those brought together by Petra / Quantum Girl to form the superhero team the Pact to face the multiversal conqueror Reaver, alongside Duncan Rosenblatt / Firebreather, Eddie Collins / ShadowHawk and Zephyr Noble. Over the course of their journey, Mark acquires the nickname "Vince" from Zephyr, befriending her alongside Duncan and Eddie, and forms a romantic relationship with Petra. After failing to destroy the Reaver, who successfully conquers Earth in the future and consumes the Viltrumite Empire, killing Mark, Petra sacrifices her existence to destroy the Reaver and prevent his invasion from taking place, saving Mark in the past, who (alongside Duncan) retains a memory of her name and significance every time they awake. The next day, Mark punches Doc Seismic in the face.

=== Marvel Team-Up ===
In Marvel Team-Up #14, during his battle with Angstrom Levy, Invincible is sent through a portal to the Marvel Universe. There, he teams up with Spider-Man to find and defeat Doctor Octopus before returning home through another portal.

=== Bomb Queen ===
In Bomb Queen, Invincible vigorously denies being in a secret relationship with the titular character after accusations by a reporter. Following Bomb Queen's bombardment of America, Invincible is seen in Baltimore clearing away the wreckage and helping survivors.

=== Dynamo 5 ===
In Dynamo 5: Sins of the Father, Invincible is among those who unite to face off against the three sons of (Dominex), who seek to regain their family's honour after their father had been defeated and spared from dying in combat by Captain Dynamo, Supreme and Omni-Man thirty years prior.

=== I Hate Fairyland ===
In I Hate Fairyland – I Hate Image, Invincible is among the superheroes flying over Image Central when Gert visits the city.

=== The Tick ===
In The Tick #100, Invincible is transported to an alternate universe by the supervillain Martin of Mars; he teams up with The Tick to defeat the villain.

=== Battle Beast ===
In Battle Beast, a one-shot published in a 2022 issue of Skybound X as a "pilot" for a potential Invincible spin-off comic book series, Invincible cameos in the opening scene, repeating Battle Beast's encounter with him from the former's perspective.

== Continuity ==
Invincible, along with Firebreather and other new Image Universe superhero characters, debuted in an issue of The Savage Dragon, and has since appeared with several of the characters in The Pact mini-series. Robert Kirkman wrote a miniseries, Savage Dragon: God War and two SuperPatriot mini-series, establishing the friendship between SuperPatriot's wife Claire and Invincible's mother in the pages of Invincible #15 and later. Invincible also appears in the fourth issue of Jay Faerber's Noble Causes, and was seen at the funeral of Captain Dynamo, father of the characters in Faerber's Dynamo 5. Invincible is also present in the fourth volume of Bomb Queen. Similarly, Invincible #48 features cameo appearances from several Savage Dragon characters, as well as both Dynamo 5 and many of Kirkman's own creations, while an earlier issue featured a funeral for the Guardians of the Globe, at which many Image characters, including Savage Dragon and Jack Staff, were in attendance.

Invincible #60 is a "done-in-one crossover event" with characters such as Spawn and Witchblade making appearances. During the invasion of Invincible's evil counterparts from alternate dimensions, the reader saw all Image heroes, like Spawn, Savage Dragon, Witchblade, Darkness, Firebreather, and Pitt fighting invaders alongside Invincible, the Guardians of the Globe, Brit, and Wolf-Man.

Image published Image United tie-in one-shot called Image United: Interlude. Shipping in March 2010, Invincible is prominently featured on the teaser cover of the first issue in front of a group of silhouetted characters covered in a classified information label. The website claims: "This March the effects of IMAGE UNITED go global with a glimpse of the crossover's impact on INVINCIBLE and many other Image Comics favorites..."

== Powers and abilities ==
Because of his Viltrumite heritage, Mark’s physical attributes—strength, speed, stamina and durability—are on a superhuman level; able to rival the most powerful superhuman opponents in the universe (including pure-blooded Viltrumites like his father), and withstand attacks from any human-made artillery (even a nuclear explosion) without a lasting injury.

His healing factor exempts him from diseases and toxins with barely any exceptions and also prolongs his lifespan to well into the hundreds of years - potentially living over a thousand years - and allows him to wholly recover from some of the most grievous injuries that a living creature can endure; although he is neither immortal nor indestructible and can potentially be killed if his vital organs (especially his heart and brain) sustain substantial damage from a superhuman opponent of equal or superior power.

Beyond his physical prowess, Mark is also able to fly under his own power at velocities beyond the speed of light and even survive within the void of space for a time, allowing for unaided interstellar travel, but is also vulnerable to specific frequencies which affect his equilibrium and therefore his flight pattern.

== In other media ==
=== Television ===
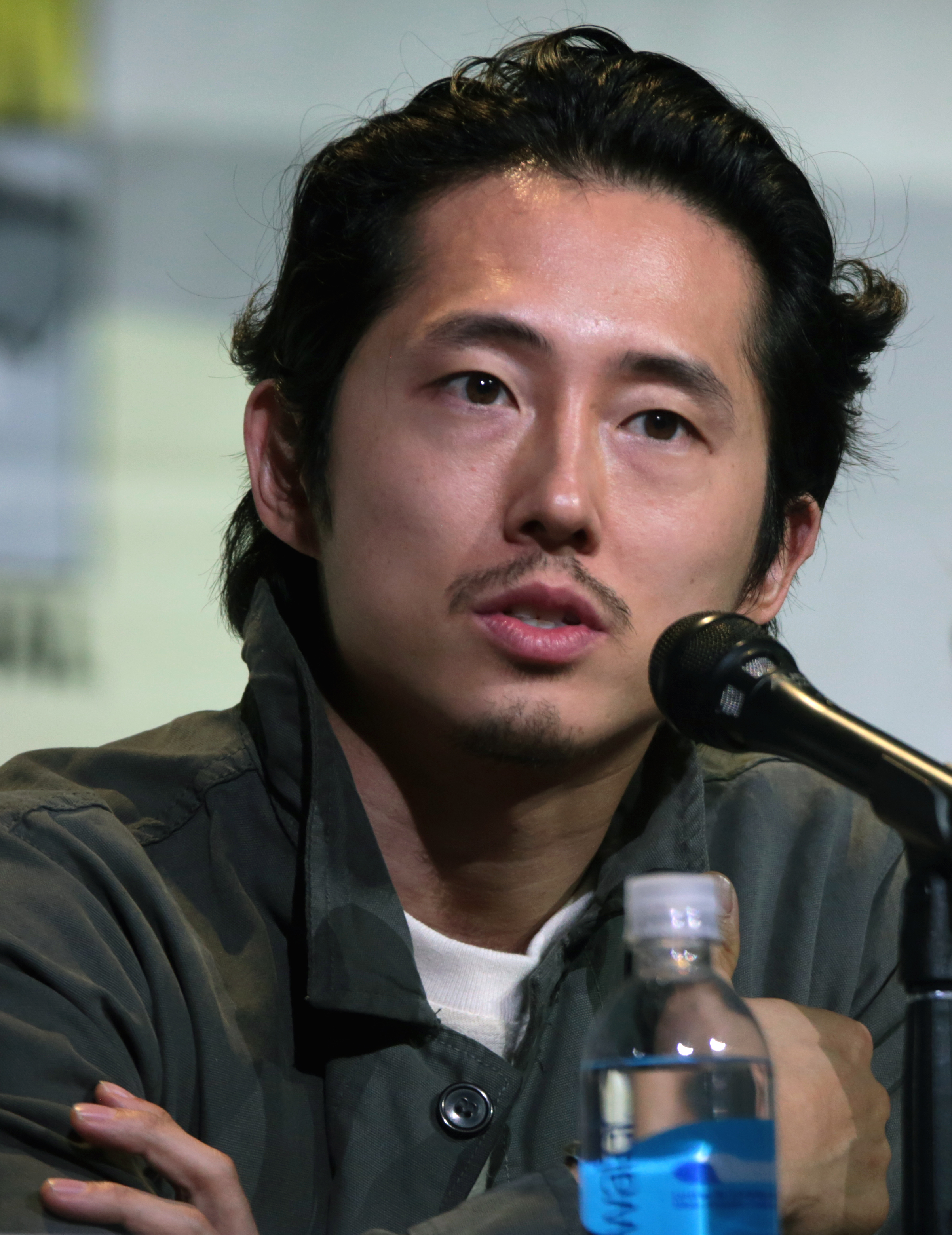
Steven Yeun voices Invincible in the TV series.

Mark Grayson / Invincible appears in an Amazon Prime Video series of the same name, voiced by Steven Yeun. Its first season premiered on March 26, 2021. After developing his powers at 17 years old, Mark discovers the harsh realities of being a superhero while struggling to define himself along with a berserker-esque rage that manifests as a result of his Viltrumite heritage. Additionally, he has worked with the Teen Team before they become the new Guardians of the Globe.

- Yeun also voices alternate timeline versions of Mark from within the multiverse.

=== Video games ===
- Invincible makes a non-speaking cameo appearance in Mortal Kombat 1 via Omni-Man's ending.
- Invincible appears as a cosmetic outfit in Fortnite: Battle Royale.
- Invincible appears as a supporting character in Invincible Presents: Atom Eve.
- Invincible appears as a playable character in Invincible: Guarding the Globe.
- Invincible appears in Funko Fusion.
- Invincible appears as a playable character in Invincible VS, voiced by Aleks Le.

=== Miscellaneous ===
Mark Grayson / Invincible appears in a self-titled Gain Enterprises motion comic adaptation of his series, voiced by Patrick Cavanaugh.

== Works cited ==
- Text was copied from Invincible (Mark Grayson) at the Image Comics Database, which is released under a Creative Commons Attribution-Share Alike 3.0 (Unported) (CC-BY-SA 3.0) license.
