= Atom Eve =

Comic book superheroine

- Image Universe character
- First appearance: Invincible #2 (February 2003)
- First game: Invincible Presents: Atom Eve
- Created by: Robert Kirkman; Cory Walker
- Voiced by: Wendy Allyn (motion comic); Gillian Jacobs (television series); Jazlyn Ione (teen, television series); Aria Kane (kid, television series)

In-universe information
- Full name: Samantha Eve Wilkins
- Nicknames: Sam; Phase One
- Species: Human
- Gender: Female
- Occupation: High School Student (formerly); Superhero; Humanitarian; Founder of Invincible Inc
- Fighting style: Flight & Agility; Limited Hand-to-Hand Combat; Energy Constructs, Blasts, & Shields; Immortality
- Family: Adam Wilkins (adoptive father); Betsy Wilkins (adoptive mother); Markus Murphy (step-son); Elias Brandyworth (creator); Polly (biological mother)
- Spouse: Mark Grayson / Invincible
- Children: Terra Grayson (daughter)
- Nationality: American

Atom Eve (Samantha Eve Wilkins) is a superheroine in the Image Universe, first appearing in Invincible #2 (February 2003) by writer Robert Kirkman and artist Cory Walker. Originally dating Rex Splode before marrying Mark Grayson, Atom Eve possesses the ability to manipulate matter at a subatomic level, allowing her to alter the molecular structure of objects, including her own body. She has been featured in comic books, television series, video games, and novels.

Atom Eve's secret identity is Samantha Eve Wilkins. Initially, she was depicted as a teenage high school student at Reginald Vel Johnson High School and was raised in Chicago, Illinois, by her adoptive parents, Betsy and Adam Wilkins. She was placed in their care after her biological mother, Polly, died during childbirth, and her creator, Dr. Elias Brandyworth, was murdered.

Eve was born with superhuman powers due to an experiment conducted on her biological mother during pregnancy, granting her an innate understanding of biological and chemical sciences. Her abilities include superhuman strength, speed, agility, stamina, durability, and balance, as well as the power to manipulate matter. She can use her abilities to create shields, weapons, and objects during combat. Additionally, she constructs and repairs materials using artificial matter of her own design, which she utilizes both for fighting and travel across the city.

== Publication history ==
Atom Eve first appeared in Invincible, set in the Image Universe, in 2003, appearing in several comics in the fictional setting. She has been adapted to motion comics, animated television, and video games.

== Fictional character biography ==
=== Atom Eve & Rex Splode ===
In Invincible Presents: Atom Eve (collected as Invincible Presents: Atom Eve & Rex Splode Volume One), Samantha Eve Wilkins, later known as Atom Eve, was the result of a top-secret government experiment designed to create a superhuman with unparalleled abilities. Her biological mother, Polly, was unknowingly subjected to genetic experimentation while pregnant under the supervision of Dr. Elias Brandyworth, a government scientist. Brandyworth's experiment aimed to enhance the unborn child's intelligence and molecular manipulation abilities, granting her an innate understanding of biological and chemical sciences at a subatomic level.

After Polly gave birth to Eve, the government sought to take control of her as a potential weapon. However, Dr. Brandyworth, recognizing the dangers of allowing the government to exploit her, decided to intervene and smuggled the newborn away from the government's grasp, ensuring she would be raised in a normal environment. To protect her, Brandyworth switched Eve with a stillborn baby at the hospital, allowing her to be placed with Betsy and Adam Wilkins, an unsuspecting couple in Chicago, Illinois.

After Polly seemingly died during childbirth (actually kept alive and experimented on by the government), Dr. Brandyworth went into hiding to protect Eve, who remained hidden for many years, growing up without knowledge of her true origins. The Wilkins family, completely unaware of her extraordinary heritage, raised her as their own daughter.

From an early age, Eve displayed an extraordinary intellect and an innate ability to understand complex scientific concepts without formal education. Her adoptive parents, noticing her advanced skills, struggled to comprehend them, imposing strict rules and expectations, hoping to mold her into what they believed was a normal, disciplined child.

During her teenage years, Eve attended Reginald Vel Johnson High School, where she excelled academically while struggling with the constraints of her home life. Her parents maintained a strict and controlling approach, often dismissing her curiosity about the world and her own identity. This tension deepened as Eve became more aware of her abilities and questioned why she felt so different from those around her.

Eve eventually learned the truth about her origins when she encountered a dying Dr. Brandyworth, who revealed the full extent of the experiment that created her, before she witnessed a still-alive Polly, her biological siblings (created by the government using Polly) and Dr. Brandyworth all be killed by the government, she unknowingly installed a mental block restricting her own powers.

Armed with this knowledge, Eve embraced her abilities and chose to use them for good, adopting the superhero identity Atom Eve. In Invincible Presents: Atom Eve & Rex Splode Volume Two, how Eve began dating Rex Splode is explored, secretly keeping him living with her in her bedroom all through the duo's teenage years.

=== Invincible ===
As a superhero, Atom Eve often uses her powers to help people, sometimes clashing with the traditional concept of heroism. She takes a break from crime-fighting to focus on humanitarian efforts, using her abilities to create resources for those in need. However, she is repeatedly drawn back into battle, facing threats such as the Viltrumite invasion and various supervillains.

Mark and Eve in a relationship

During her adolescence, Eve discovered her powers and decided to use them for good. She adopted the superhero identity of Atom Eve and joined the Teen Team, a group of young superheroes. Her abilities allowed her to transmute objects, enabling her to perform feats such as transforming one substance into another and healing injuries by rearranging molecular structures.

Eve's partnership with fellow superhero Invincible (Mark Grayson) evolved over time from comrades-in-arms to a deep romantic relationship. Their bond faced numerous challenges, including battles against formidable foes and personal struggles. Eventually, they married and had a daughter named Terra, balancing their responsibilities as parents with their duties as superheroes.

Eventually, she breaks her previous mental limits and her powers are bolstered to nigh-omnipotent levels, though she retains the discipline to not utilize it on other beings. Breaking her limits allows her to match Mark's Viltrumite powers, and grow back her leg years after losing it. Sick of Earth after the utopian reign of Robot renders crime obsolete, she and Mark move to an alien planet with their daughter. After Mark is sent to an alternate past for years, Eve moves on and begins dating again, raising their daughter alone; on Mark's return, she joins him in facing off against the children of former Viltrumite leader Thragg, before Mark assumes his throne as Emperor Markus Grayson I of the Viltrumite Empire, Emperor of the Universe, with Eve as his Empress Consort.

Decades later, on Eve's deathbed, she suddenly rejuvenates to her youth, and realises she is immortal, and so can be with Mark forever due to his eternal longevity. 500 years later, Eve lounges as Mark thinks back fondly on his father's words of "What will you have after 500 years?".

=== Noble Causes ===
In Noble Causes, Eve attends Race and Liz Noble's anniversary party at the Noble family mansion, as well as the funeral of Captain Dynamo (a scene later shown again in Dynamo 5).

=== The Pact ===
In The Pact, set after Mark's breakup with Amber in Invincible, Eve attempts to convince Mark to accept Robot's offer to join the Guardians of the Globe, inadvertently inspiring him to form a team of his own.

=== The Tick ===
In The Tick Meets Invincible, the now-dating Atom Eve and Invincible are briefly transported to the Tick's universe.

== Other versions ==
A number of alternate universes and alternate timelines in Image Universe publications allow writers to introduce variations on Atom Eve, in which the character's origins, behavior, and morality differ from the mainstream setting.

=== Brit ===
In Brit: Fubar, an alternate reality variant of Eve called Atom Shiva is introduced, a supervillain who forms a power couple with Hex Splode, and their pet Monstrous Girl, collectively known as "The Emperor's Elite", in service of the Geldarians following their conquest of Earth. Having used to date Invincible, Shiva is outraged when he punches out Hex, before she herself is knocked out by Tech Jacket.

=== Reboot? ===
In Invincible: Reboot?, an alternate reality variant of Eve is introduced who due to Mark's impact on the past, remains with Rex Splode. Not wishing this reality to remain the constant, due to how their daughter Terra would be erased from reality, although less people would die in the future than in his home reality, Mark rejects the will of the "gods" who sent him there, and returns to his home reality, finding years to have passed.

== Powers and fighting styles ==
Atom Eve possesses the ability to manipulate matter at a subatomic level. This power enables her to alter the atomic and molecular structure of both organic and inorganic matter, effectively transforming one substance into another. This power enables her to transform substances, such as changing leaves into food or reshaping her clothing. In combat scenarios, Atom Eve employs her powers to create protective force fields, generate energy blasts, and construct various weapons or tools from her energy constructs. She can also manipulate elemental forces, allowing her to control aspects of nature such as air and earth.

A notable aspect of her abilities is the presence of mental blocks, which typically prevent her from manipulating sentient matter. However, during moments of extreme emotional distress or near-death experiences, these barriers can be temporarily overridden, granting her enhanced capabilities, including accelerated healing and even resurrection. Despite the vast potential of her powers, their extensive use can lead to rapid caloric depletion, necessitating increased nutritional intake to maintain her health and sustain her abilities. Her fighting style is primarily defensive and strategic, emphasizing battlefield manipulation rather than direct combat. While her abilities are extensive, they are constrained by her concentration and the complexity of the transformations she performs. Overuse or attempting highly intricate alterations can result in both physical and mental exhaustion.

== Adaptations ==
=== Motion comic ===
In 2008, Wendy Allyn voiced Atom Eve in the Invincible motion comic by Gain Enterprises, made using the Bomb-xx process and broadcast on MTV2 and downloadable to mobile phones, from iTunes, and Amazon.

=== Animated series ===
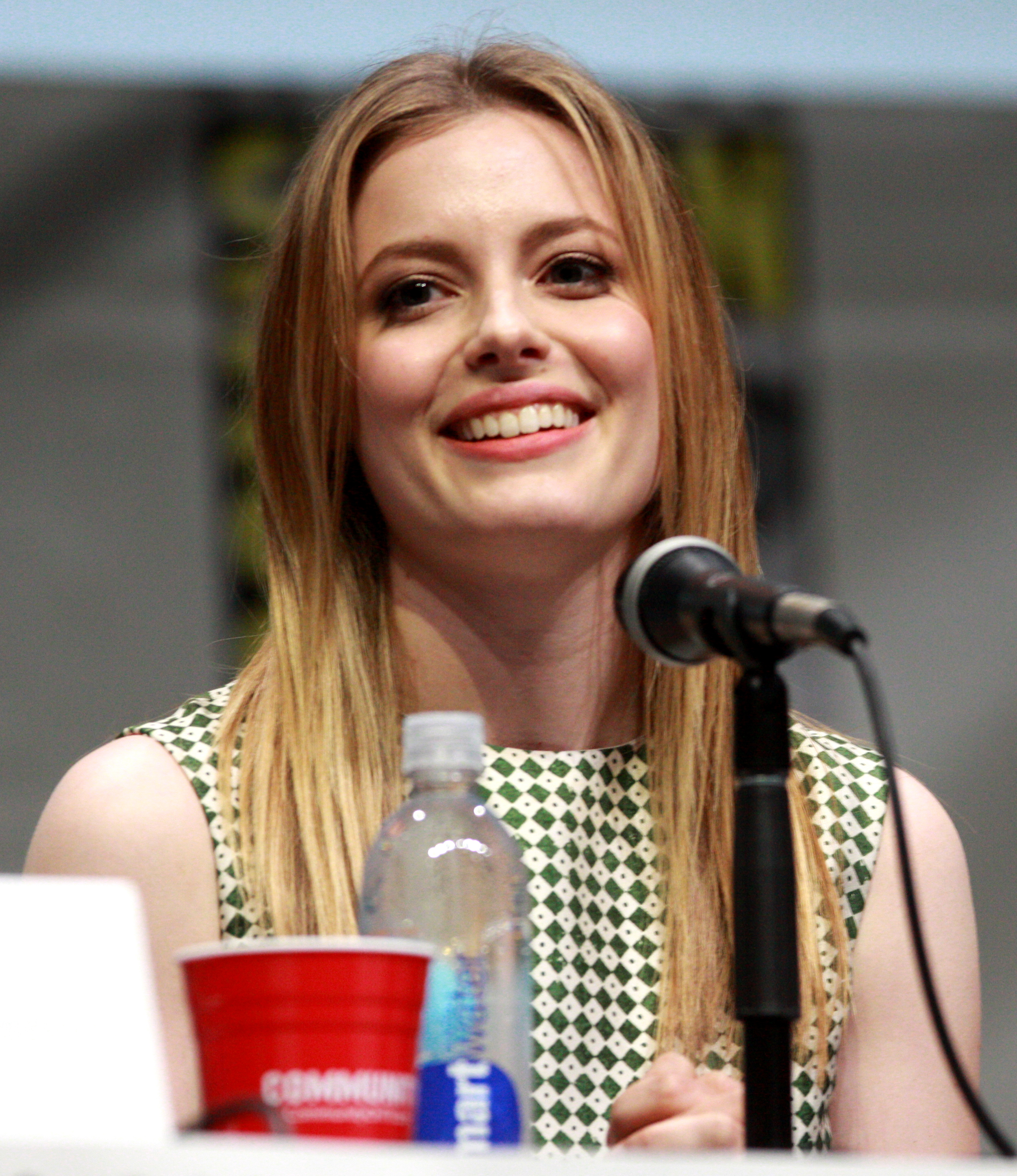
Atom Eve is voiced by Gillian Jacobs in the animated series.

Atom Eve appears in the 2021–present Invincible animated series on Amazon Prime Video, voiced by Gillian Jacobs. The series closely follows her comic book storyline, emphasizing her growth as a hero and her relationship with Invincible. A standalone "Invincible Atom Eve" special episode, released in 2023, delves deeper into her backstory.

=== Video games ===
In November 2023, Invincible Presents: Atom Eve, a visual novel/turn-based role-playing game, was released. Players take on the role of Atom Eve, exploring her backstory and experiencing her journey as a superhero. The game has received positive reviews for its engaging narrative and gameplay mechanics.

Atom Eve is a playable character in the 2024 free-to-play mobile role-playing game Invincible: Guarding the Globe, where she is classified as a support character due to her ability to shield fellow allies.

Atom Eve also appeared as a cosmetic outfit in Fortnite Battle Royale.

Atom Eve is a playable character in the 2026 fighting game Invincible VS, reprised by Gillian Jacobs.

== Reception ==
Atom Eve, created by Robert Kirkman and Cory Walker, has received positive critical reception across different adaptations.

Joshua Edelglass Invincible Atom Eve, highlighting the depth it added to her backstory and character development. He noted that the episode effectively showcased Eve's inherent nobility and strong moral compass, contributing significantly to the series' narrative. A review from The Cosmic Circus commended the series for delving into her backstory, portraying her as "charming, witty, and full of preteen angst," which added depth to her character. Collider likewise described the episode as a "captivating standalone story" that effectively explores her background and motivations.

In 2023, Invincible Presents: Atom Eve, a video game developed by Terrible Posture Games, further explored the character's backstory adapting the self-titled comic book, receiving generally favorable reviews, with a Metacritic score of 79 out of 100. Audra Bowling of RPGFan praised the game for its accessibility to both newcomers and existing fans, noting that it provided an engaging narrative centered on Atom Eve. The game's portrayal was lauded for its depth, allowing players to experience Eve's journey of self-discovery and heroism. Shacknews highlighting its "thoughtful story and character development," GameGrin noting it as a "short and sweet game" suitable for both newcomers and fans, and Pop Culture Maniacs seeing it as depicting her in a more supportive and proactive light compared to the comics.

Her abilities have been compared to those of Doctor Manhattan, a character from Watchmen by Alan Moore and Dave Gibbons.
