= Tech Jacket =

American comic book from 2002 to 2003

- Tech Jacket (2002) issue 1 Cover

Publication information
- Publisher: Image Comics
- Genre: Superhero
- No. of issues: Tech Jacket #1–8; Tech Jacket Digital #1–3; Tech Jacket (2014–2015) #1–12
- Main characters: Zack Thompson / Tech Jacket; Daniel Thompson / Zack’s father; Lin Hiyashi / Geldarian princess

Creative team
- Created by: Robert Kirkman; E. J. Su
- Written by: Robert Kirkman
- Artist: E. J. Su

Collected editions
- The Boy From Earth: ISBN 1-58240-771-1
- Lift Off: ISBN 1-63215-029-8
- Touch the Sky: ISBN 1-63215-257-6
- All Falls Down: ISBN 1-63215-344-0

Tech Jacket is an American comic book created by writer Robert Kirkman and artist E. J. Su, first published monthly by Image Comics from November 2002 to April 2003. The series follows Zack Thompson, a high school student, who inherits and permanently bonds with a powerful suit of technologically advanced armor and weaponry from a dying alien, which grants him incredible strength, speed, flight, durability, and protection. Zack is thrust into the larger universe of intergalactic politics, wars, and alien species. He helps defend Earth and space from various cosmic threats while dealing with the burdens of being a teen superhero.

== Plot ==
Zack Thompson, a high school student, becomes an unexpected hero when he finds a crash-landed spaceship and encounters Kelda, a dying alien from the Geldarian race, an advanced and extremely intelligent but physically weak species who are equipped at birth with a powerful technological suit of armor and weaponry called a Tech Jacket. To save Zack from his ship's impending self-destruct sequence, Kelda transfers his Tech Jacket to Zack, which permanently bonds to him. This advanced suit grants Zack immense strength, speed, flight, durability, the ability to produce powerful blasts of energy, and create weaponry from the suit. His powers surpass that of any Geldarian due to his stronger human physiology.

As other Geldarians arrive on Earth to investigate the death of their comrade and find the missing Tech Jacket, they initially suspect Zack of foul play, believing he stole the Tech Jacket. However, they soon discover what happened from Zack’s Tech Jacket, realizing his potential and increased capabilities, they enlist his help in their decades-long war against the Kresh, a formidable alien enemy responsible for the crashing of Kelda’s ship and his death. Zack undergoes training with the Geldarian warriors, learning and developing fast as his innate human strength together with the Tech Jacket’s capabilities make him a force to be reckoned with. He leads the Geldarian army in a critical battle, turning the tide of the war and forcing the Kresh to retreat.

After the war, the grateful Geldarians release Zack from any obligations, allowing him to return to Earth and eventually reunite with his parents. The Geldarians soon return to Earth with a mothership to warn Zack of a remnant segment of the Kresh army who followed him back to earth to enact revenge for his role in defeating them in the war. However, they themselves were tailed by a dangerous massive mechanical serpent-like creature called a Scavengine, that feeds on technology and is attacking and consuming the Geldarian mothership. Zack helps them defeat the creature saving the lives of the civilians on the ship, and the Geldarian princess, Lin, who develops an interest in Zack and they start dating. The Geldarians gift Zack a space satellite orbiting station to help him monitor and protect the planet from terrestrial and celestial threats before finally leaving for their home world.

The Tech Jacket Digital 3-issue miniseries details Zack’s involvement in the Invincible War, where he managed to defeat two variants of Mark Grayson/Invincible. After the Invincible War arc, Zack faces his strongest and most ruthless foe yet, Null—a formidable alien bounty hunter renowned for undertaking perilous missions that few would dare. Null wreaks havoc on Earth killing dozens of people and he easily subdues and nearly kills Zack. Despite being overpowered and severely injured, Zack’s resilience shines as he strategizes and devises a desperate plan to defeat Null. With assistance from Princess Lin, Zack makes a final stand, rerouting all remaining power from his Tech Jacket to its propulsion system despite warnings of catastrophic failure taking the enemy into his space station base and using its teleporter to send him into the sun. After the battle, Zack and Lin’s bond grows stronger but their relationship comes to a halt after discovering that they are biologically incompatible.

The series was later revived (2014–2015) with Zack now more experienced and confident in his role. He faces new challenges, such as the invasion by the Zironians, a brutal alien race threatening galactic peace. Zack’s responsibilities expand as he navigates complex interstellar politics and he questions the morality of the Geldarian Empire. He also balances his duties with personal relationships, confronting the dynamic between him and Lin, who plays a larger role in the final battle against an all-powerful cosmic entity hell-bent on destroying civilizations that become too advanced.

== Publication history ==
Tech Jacket debuted with a six-issue run from November 2002 to April 2003, created by writer Robert Kirkman and artist E.J. Su. The comic introduces Zack Thompson, an ordinary high school student who unexpectedly inherits an incredibly powerful piece of alien technology known as the Tech Jacket. This suit—created by the Geldarians, a highly advanced and intelligent alien race—grants him a host of high-tech capabilities. These issues were later collected into the trade paperback Tech Jacket Volume 1: The Boy From Earth.

In 2013, the story continued with digital-only issues #7 and #8, which were reprints of backup stories from Invincible issues #71–75, 77–78, and 80. These were followed by a three-issue digital miniseries in 2014, written by Joe Keatinge with art by Khary Randolph. This miniseries served as a bridge between the original run and the upcoming ongoing series, reintroducing Zack Thompson in a more seasoned role as Earth’s galactic guardian. These digital issues were collected in Tech Jacket Volume 2: Lift Off.

Following the digital miniseries, Tech Jacket was relaunched as a print series under Skybound/Image Comics, running for 12 issues from July 2014 to December 2015. Joe Keatinge continued as the writer, with Khary Randolph as the artist. This series expanded the Tech Jacket universe with high-stakes, cosmic adventures, showcasing Zack’s evolution as a hero. The issues were collected into two volumes: Volume 3: Touch the Sky (issues #1–6) and Volume 4: All Falls Down (issues #7–12).

Tech Jacket is set within the same universe as Kirkman's Invincible. Zack Thompson appears in the "Viltrumite War" storyline, collaborating with characters like Invincible, Omni Man, and Allen the Alien.

== Collected editions ==
Title	Material collected	Published date	ISBN
Tech Jacket Volume 1: The Boy From Earth	Tech Jacket (vol. 1) #1–6	January 1, 2003	ISBN 978-1-58240-771-5
Tech Jacket Volume 2: Lift Off	Tech Jacket (vol. 1) #7–8 and Tech Jacket Digital #1–3	July 2, 2014	ISBN 978-1-63215-029-5
Tech Jacket Volume 3: Touch the Sky	Tech Jacket (vol. 3) #1–6	January 20, 2015	ISBN 978-1-63215-177-3
Tech Jacket Volume 4: All Falls Down	Tech Jacket (vol. 3) #7–12	May 25, 2016	ISBN 978-1-63215-344-9

== In other media ==
A gender-swapped version of Tech Jacket, named Zoe Thompson, appears in the third and fourth seasons of the Prime Video TV series Invincible voiced by Zoey Deutch.

== Reception ==
The 8-issue Tech Jacket first volume, The Boy from Earth, holds an average rating score of 3.32 stars out of 5 for 10 reviews on the book tracking and recommendation website TheStoryGraph, with most reviewers calling the story plot driven and written for a younger audience.

The 12-issue Tech Jacket (2014) series collecting Volumes 3 & 4 holds a strong average critic score of 8.5 out of 10 for 34 reviews, and a user score of 8.0 out of 10 for 7 reviews on the review aggregator website Comic Book Roundup. AIPT's David Brooke commended its art and called it a "very enjoyable popcorn type of comic that excels at action and adventure".
