= Cory Walker =

American comic book artist and penciler

- Cory Walker at Lucca Comics & Games 2018
- Born: 1980 (age 45–46)
- Area: Penciller
- Notable works: Invincible comic book (Invincible, Rex Splode, and Atom Eve) and television series

Cory Walker (born 1980) is an American comic book artist known for his work as a penciler on the Image Comics' series Invincible, which he co-created with writer Robert Kirkman. With Kirkman he also collaborated on several comics for Image and Marvel Comics. In 2020 he was revealed to be the lead designer of the Invincible animated series.

== Bibliography ==
=== Image Comics ===
- Superpatriot: America's Fighting Force #1–4 (2002)
- Invincible #1–7, 25, 50, 66–67, 85–86, 93–96, 100, 127–132, 144 (2003–2018)
- Invincible Returns #1 (2010)
- Battle Pope #9–10 (2006)
- Science Dog #1–2, 25 (2010–11, 2020)

=== Marvel Comics ===
- Spider-Man Unlimited (Vol. 3) #4 (2004)
- Marvel Team-Up #14, 19 (2005, 2006)
- I Heart Marvel: Web of Romance #1 (2006)
- The Irredeemable Ant-Man #7–8 (2007)
- The Punisher War Journal (Vol. 2) #13 (2007)
- Destroyer MAX #1–5 (2007)

=== DC Comics ===
- Shadowpact #3, 6 (2006)
