= Invincible season 3 =

Season of television series

Invincible
- Season 3
- Promotional poster
- Showrunner: Simon Racioppa
- Starring: Steven Yeun; Sandra Oh; J. K. Simmons
- No. of episodes: 8

Release
- Original network: Amazon Prime Video
- Original release: February 6 – March 13, 2025

Season chronology
- ← Previous; Season 2 Next → Season 4

The third season of Invincible, an American adult animated superhero television series created by Robert Kirkman who also wrote the comics. The season was produced by Amazon MGM Studios in association with Point Grey Pictures, Skybound North, Skybound Animation and Wind Sun Sky Entertainment, with Simon Racioppa serving as showrunner. In this season, Mark Grayson / Invincible (Steven Yeun) is forced to confront both his past and future as he grapples with the sacrifices necessary to protect his loved ones. Unlike the previous season, this season does not include a mid-season break.

The season consists of eight episodes. The first three episodes were released simultaneously Amazon Prime Video on February 6, 2025, with the remaining episodes scheduled for weekly release until March 13, 2025.

As with previous seasons, the third season received critical acclaim for its acting, writing, storytelling, and character development. The season finale was also widely well received, with much of the praise going to the fight between Mark and Conquest.

== Episodes ==
| No. overall | No. in season | Title | Directed by | Written by | Original release date |
|---|---|---|---|---|---|
| 18 | 1 | "You're Not Laughing Now" | Jason Zurek | Simon Racioppa | February 6, 2025 |
Three months after his battle with Angstrom Levy, Mark continues training under Cecil's supervision to gain enough strength to compete with Viltrumites while avoiding Eve. Mark and Rex try to stop two thieves, Dropkick and Fightmaster, from stealing the Declaration of Independence, but are attacked by Dupli-Kate's brother, Multi-Paul, who tries to avenge his sister's death. Kate and the Immortal come out of retirement while Rae returns to the Guardians. William and Rick encourage Mark to confess his feelings and ask Eve out, but warn him against telling her about her future self. However, Mark lets it slip, leading Eve to reject him. Doc Seismic breaks out of confinement and kidnaps Earth's superheroes using giant underground creatures. When Mark and Eve fail to save the heroes, Cecil sends in Darkwing II and Reanimen to help, with Darkwing II recapturing Doc Seismic. Mark confronts Cecil for lying to him and working with Darkwing II and Sinclair, leading Cecil to trap him in the White Room, which was constructed to keep him safe from Mark. Allen and Nolan bond in prison while the Viltrumites begin testing Allen to determine the source of his newfound strength.
| 19 | 2 | "A Deal with the Devil" | Haylee Herrick | Helen Leigh | February 6, 2025 |
In a flashback, Cecil objects to his predecessor rehabilitating criminals. In the present, Mark destroys Reanimen deployed to stop him. Cecil activates a device installed in Mark's head matching the Atlantean kaiju's roars, causing him intense pain and preventing him from flying. Mark flees to the Guardians for help but Cecil arrives and attacks Mark with more Reanimen, prompting the Guardians to aid him. Robot jams the signal that is harming Mark while Cecil, realizing his mistake, deactivates the Reanimen. A furious Mark threatens to kill Cecil should he approach him or his family, ending their working relationship. The Guardians break up, with Monster Girl, Rex, Rae, Bulletproof, and Robot losing trust in Cecil, while the Immortal, Kate, Samson, and Shapesmith remain and are joined by Darkwing II. Cecil later reflects on his first meeting with Nolan and developing his personal code of doing anything to protect Earth while Mark and Eve reconcile and start a relationship.
| 20 | 3 | "You Want a Real Costume, Right?" | Sol Choi | Jay Faerber | February 6, 2025 |
Mark receives a new suit from Art. After getting his own suit, Oliver names himself "Kid Omni-Man", but Mark advises against it, explaining the destruction Nolan caused, before they join forces to stop Titan from breaking out Multi-Paul. Eve moves back in with her parents, promising not to use her powers at home if they become more accepting of her duties as a hero. Debbie forms a relationship with her colleague Paul and reveals to him Nolan, Mark, and Oliver's secret identities, angering Mark. The Maulers break into a missile silo, planning to launch an EMP device to destroy the world's communication systems, and incapacitate the attacking Guardians. Mark destroys the missile while Oliver, against Mark and Debbie's wishes, kills the Maulers. He reveals to Mark his indifference to killing, believing Nolan may be right, worrying Mark. While talking with Oliver, Mark notices a floating orb-like drone spying on the Grayson household, which detonates in his hand as he catches it. Unbeknownst to him, the drone belongs to Angstrom, who survived his previous encounter with Mark.
| 21 | 4 | "You Were My Hero" | Ian Abando | Tania Lotia | February 13, 2025 |
Mark asks Robot to analyze the drone, which he determines originated from Earth and was created by someone with vast resources. Mark confronts Cecil, believing he built it, but Cecil denies it. Later, while on a date with Eve, Fightmaster and Dropkick forcibly recruit Mark and bring him to their future, believing he can save their Earth from its tyrannical king, the Immortal. Driven mad by his immense power and immortality, he blames Mark for his eventual abandonment of Earth and demands he fight him to the death to bring him peace. Reluctantly, Mark fights and is eventually forced to kill the Immortal. Returning to the present, a shaken Mark finds solace with Eve. Meanwhile, Nolan faces execution until Allen breaks free, liberates their fellow inmates, gains Battle Beast's help in fending off the Viltrumites, and feigns defeat to spur Nolan into action. After breaking out, Allen suggests they flee before reinforcements arrive, but Nolan reveals the Viltrum Empire now consists of fewer than fifty pure-blooded members.
| 22 | 5 | "This Was Supposed to Be Easy" | Tanner Johnson | Helen Shang | February 20, 2025 |
After Mark suggests that he and Eve get their own apartment, she offers Invincible's services to a supervillain prison. Debbie later sends the couple out in search of Oliver, whom they discover has befriended two children while defending them from bullies. Meanwhile, Titan is pressured by Mr. Liu, a fellow crime boss and the leader of a criminal organization called the Order, into breaking out Multi-Paul or Liu will kill his family. Titan manipulates Liu into helping him before they attack the prison holding Multi-Paul. While fighting Mark and Eve, Multi-Paul escapes while Titan's henchman, Isotope, frees Machine Head, who shoots Liu. Afterwards, Mark and Eve decide to take their relationship at a slow pace. Machine Head assumes control of the Order and grants Titan his autonomy, unaware that Liu survived.
| 23 | 6 | "All I Can Say Is I'm Sorry" | Jason Zurek | Ross Stracke and Simon Racioppa | February 27, 2025 |
Having witnessed his sister and niece's deaths during Mark and Nolan's fight in Chicago, GDA scientist Scott Duvall steals advanced bio-capacitors to augment his ability to convert kinetic energy into electrical power and publicly challenges Mark. Wishing to take the night off to celebrate William's birthday, Mark ignores Scott while Shapesmith answers his challenge. Scott defeats Shapesmith and flees to his wife Becky and son Jack, fearing GDA retaliation. As Robot works with Monster Girl to stop her powers from de-aging her body when she uses them, Rae confesses to Rex that she plans to retire from superhero work, which he accepts before they kiss. Amidst a memorial for the Chicago massacre, Scott takes the name "Powerplex" and tries to lure out Mark again, but is defeated and captured by Eve. Nonetheless, Scott escapes and returns to Becky, who suggests he stages her and Jack's kidnapping and use them as bait. Mark attempts to talk Scott down, but Scott accidentally kills his family while fighting Mark. After being taken into GDA custody, Scott vows revenge on Mark. Elsewhere, Angstrom gathers several of Mark's multiversal variants.
| 24 | 7 | "What Have I Done?" | Haylee Herrick | Robert Kirkman | March 6, 2025 |
Angstrom sends his Invincible variants to destroy Earth and tarnish Mark's image. The GDA, the Guardians, and Earth's heroes are overwhelmed and suffer heavy losses. Scott briefly escapes; Eve is incapacitated; Rex sacrifices himself to save Robot, Monster Girl, and Bulletproof; Darkwing II is presumed dead; and the Immortal, Kate, Samson, and Shapesmith are wounded. When the surviving Invincibles turn on Angstrom, he traps them on a desolate Earth before battling Mark. Mark overpowers and nearly kills Angstrom, but he escapes to the Technicians, advanced cybernetic surgeons who previously healed him. Angstrom orders them to fix his wounds, but they refuse, demanding he repay them for all they have done for him. In the aftermath of Angstrom's attack, an aged Viltrumite envoy named Conquest arrives to survey Mark's subjugation of Earth for the Viltrum Empire and is disappointed by his lack of progress. Devastated by the destruction and deaths directed at him, Mark charges at Conquest to vent his rage.
| 25 | 8 | "I Thought You'd Never Shut Up" | Sol Choi | Robert Kirkman | March 13, 2025 |
Conquest and Mark fight, destroying cities and maiming each other in the process. Oliver and Eve attempt to intervene, but are injured. Nonetheless, Eve temporarily overcomes her mental blocks, allowing her to reconstruct her body and burn Conquest's skin off before Mark seemingly kills him. Mark awakens in the hospital, where Debbie apologizes for bringing him into this world, though Mark says he does not blame her. At Rex's funeral, Robot changes his real name to Rex to honor him. As the world rebuilds, Rus builds up an army of Sequid-possessed humans, a group of aliens find Battle Beast, and the Technicians fully heal Angstrom before working out a partnership to claim a new world. Cecil reveals to Donald he has captured a comatose Conquest and placed him in an underground prison, intending to interrogate him about the Viltrum Empire. Mark tells Oliver he was right to kill people, promising to do so to anyone who threatens their family. Meanwhile, Damien Darkblood meets with Satan to help reinstate him as Hell's ruler by exploiting a powerful being on Earth.

== Cast and characters ==
=== Main cast ===
- Steven Yeun as Mark Grayson / Invincible, Alternate Invincibles
- Sandra Oh as Deborah "Debbie" Grayson
- J. K. Simmons as Nolan Grayson / Omni-Man
- Christian Convery as Oliver Grayson / Kid Omni-Man
- Gillian Jacobs as Samantha Eve Wilkins / Atom Eve

=== Recurring ===
- Jason Mantzoukas as Rex Sloan / Rex Splode
- Walton Goggins as Cecil Stedman
- Zachary Quinto as Robot
- Malese Jow as Kate Cha / Dupli-Kate
- Grey Griffin as Amanda / Monster Girl (human form), Rachel / Shrinking Rae, Betsy Wilkins
- Khary Payton as Markus Grimshaw / Black Samson
- Fred Tatasciore as Giant, Adam Wilkins
- Jay Pharoah as Zandale Randolph / Bulletproof
- Ross Marquand as The Immortal, Rudy
- Ben Schwartz as Shapesmith
- Cliff Curtis as Paul
- Cleveland Berto as Darkwing II, Bolt
- Sterling K. Brown as Angstrom Levy
- Chris Diamantopoulos as Donald Ferguson, Doc Seismic, Isotope
- Kevin Michael Richardson as Mauler Twins, Amanda / Monster Girl (monster)
- Calista Flockhart as April Howsam
- Zazie Beetz as Amber Justine Bennett
- Andrew Rannells as William Francis Clockwell
- Mark Hamill as Arthur "Art" Rosenbaum

=== Guest ===
- Seth Rogen as Allen the Alien
- Xolo Maridueña as Fightmaster, Dropkick
- Simu Liu as Multi-Paul
- Michael Dorn as Thokk / Battle Beast
- Doug Bradley as the Technicians
- Jonathan Banks as Brit
- Jeffrey Dean Morgan as Conquest
- Aaron Paul as Scott Duvall / Powerplex
- Todd Williams as Titan
- Tzi Ma as Mister Liu
- Nicole Byer as Vanessa
- Jeffrey Donovan as Machine Head
- Kate Mara as Becky Duvall
- John DiMaggio as Elephant
- Eric Bauza as D.A. Sinclair
- Clancy Brown as Ka-Hor, Damien Darkblood
- Bruce Campbell as Demon

== Production ==
=== Development ===
Invincible was renewed for a third season alongside Season 2 on April 29, 2021, reflecting Amazon’s confidence in the series. Robert Kirkman, the series creator, serves as co-showrunner with Simon Racioppa, with executive producers including Seth Rogen, Evan Goldberg, David Alpert, and Catherine Winder. The season is produced by Skybound Entertainment and Amazon MGM Studios, with animation handled by Wind Sun Sky Entertainment, Skybound North, and Maven Image Project. In May 2024, Ross Marquand stated that Season 3 was “nearly finished,” targeting an early 2025 release.

=== Animation ===
The season introduces Mark’s blue-and-black costume, teased in Season 2’s title card evolution, symbolizing his shift to a more hardened hero. Animation quality has been enhanced, with Kirkman praising the work of the studios involved.

== Release ==
Season 3 premiered on February 6, 2025, with its first three episodes available on Amazon Prime Video, followed by weekly releases every Thursday at 3:00 AM EST until March 13, 2025. A teaser trailer was released in October 2024, featuring Mark and Cecil Stedman at Burger Mart, addressing the lack of a mid-season break in response to Season 2 criticism. A full trailer dropped in December 2024, showcasing Mark’s new training regimen and threats like the Mauler Twins and Reanimen.

== Reception ==
=== Audience viewership ===
Audience reception was similarly positive. The season finale received a 9.9/10 rating on IMDb, making it one of the highest-rated television episodes on the platform.

=== Critical response ===
The review aggregator website Rotten Tomatoes calculated a 100% approval rating based on 27 reviews were positive. The website's critics consensus reads, "Muddying the waters of justice and adding droplets of blood for good measure, Invincible and its titular hero reach their prime with this epic third season."

Timothy Lee of Geeks of Color praised the writing, character development, and action sequences, especially Conquest’s introduction and his battle with Mark Grayson. Steven Yeun’s performance was also praised. Lee noted that "Invincible shows that superhero stories can still be exciting if they put interesting characters, passion, creativity, and real stakes front and center," Lee, gave it 7 out of 10. The AV Club's William Hughes gave it a B, acknowledging that even with the fights lacking a particular distinctive punch, the season is still the stuff Invincible exists to dig into beneath all the arterial sprays and silly quips. Nate Richards of Collider said the third season of Invincible is more drama-filled than the previous seasons, with much of the attention being paid to emotions and character interaction. Among the characters that received special attention in this season were Mark Grayson, Atom Eve, Cecil Stedman, Rex Splode, and Oliver, as well as themes such as guilt, responsibility, and maturity. Additionally, many critics focused on the developing relationship between Mark and Eve, as well as the effects of previous events of the show on the characters' actions and decisions. Additionally, according to Richards, unlike previous seasons that featured an overall evil person, the third season lacks a specific antagonistic character in the form of Omni-Man or Angstrom Levy, who would threaten the main characters in some way. Instead, Powerplex and Cecil act as conflicting forces for the protagonists.

=== Accolades ===
Steven Yeun received a nomination for Outstanding Character Voice-Over Performance at the 77th Primetime Creative Arts Emmy Awards for his role as Invincible/Mark Grayson in the episode for "What Have I Done?." Luke Asa Guidici, Matt Michael, Lea Carosella, and Liam Johnson received a nomination for Outstanding Achievement for Editorial in an Animated Television/Broadcast Production at the 53rd Annie Awards for the episode "I Thought You'd Never Shut Up." Brad Meyer, Natalia Saavedra Brychcy, Katie Jackson, Noah Kowalski, Jayson Niner, Mia Perfetti, Logan Romjue, and Carol Ma were nominated for Outstanding Achievement in Sound Editing - Non-Theatrical Animation at the Golden Reel Awards 2025 for their work on the episode "I Thought You'd Never Shut Up."

List of accolades received by Invicible Season 2
| Year | Award | Category | Result |
|---|---|---|---|
| 2025 | 77th Primetime Creative Arts Emmy Awards | Outstanding Character Voice-Over Performance - Steven Yeun as Invincible/Mark Grayson | Nominated |
| 2026 | 53rd Annie Awards | Outstanding Achievement for Editorial in an Animated Television/Broadcast Production - Luke Asa Guidici, Matt Michael, Lea Carosella, and Liam Johnson | Nominated |
| 2026 | Golden Reel Awards 2025 | Outstanding Achievement in Sound Editing - Non-Theatrical Animation - Brad Meyer, Natalia Saavedra Brychcy, Katie Jackson, Noah Kowalski, Jayson Niner, Mia Perfetti, Logan Romjue, Carol Ma | Nominated |
