= Invincible season 2 =

Season of streaming series

Invincible
- Season 2
- Promotional poster
- Showrunner: Simon Racioppa
- Starring: Steven Yeun; Sandra Oh; J. K. Simmons
- No. of episodes: 8 + special

Release
- Original network: Amazon Prime Video
- Original release: July 21, 2023
- Original release: November 3 – November 24, 2023
- Original release: March 14 – April 4, 2024

Season chronology
- ← Previous; Season 1 Next → Season 3

The second season of the American adult animated superhero series Invincible, based on the comic book series of the same name, was created for television by comic book writer Robert Kirkman who also wrote the comics. The season was produced by Amazon MGM Studios in association with Point Grey Pictures, Skybound North, Skybound Animation and Wind Sun Sky Entertainment, with Simon Racioppa serving as showrunner. Taking place a month after the events of the previous season, Mark Grayson is attempting to regain his life after being betrayed by Omni-Man while simultaneously dealing with the repercussions of the aftermath and attempting to not end up like his father. Also, Mark contends with a new threat in Angstrom Levy, an interdimensional traveler with a personal vendetta against him.

Steven Yeun stars as Mark Grayson / Invincible, while Sandra Oh and J. K. Simmons play his parents Debbie Grayson and Nolan Grayson / Omni-Man respectively. While the supporting cast is formed by Gillian Jacobs, Andrew Rannells, Zazie Beetz, Walton Goggins, Seth Rogen, Sterling K. Brown, Ross Marquand, Malese Jow, Mark Hamill, Chris Diamantopoulos, Kevin Michael Richardson, Fred Tatasciore, Eric Bauza, Jason Mantzoukas, Khary Payton, Zachary Quinto, Grey Griffin, Ben Schwartz, Jay Pharoah, and Calista Flockhart.

The season was preceded by a special episode, called "Invincible: Atom Eve", which was released on July 21, 2023. The season itself was divided into two parts and premiered on Amazon Prime Video on November 3, 2023, with the first four episodes each week until November 24, and the final four from March 14, 2024, through April 4. A third season was ordered on April 29, 2021.

== Episodes ==
No. overall	No. in season	Title	Directed by	Written by	Original release date
Special
9	–	"Invincible: Atom Eve"	Haylee Herrick	Helen Leigh and Robert Kirkman	July 21, 2023
Eighteen years ago, government scientist Dr. Elias Brandyworth disobeys his superior, Steven Erickson, and leaves with a dying pregnant woman named Polly, who gives birth to a powerful superhuman. Fulfilling Polly's wishes, Brandyworth swaps her child with the Wilkins' deceased newborn so that she can grow up with a normal family as Samantha Eve Wilkins. Growing up, Eve proves highly knowledgeable about molecules and is admitted to a school for scholars, but longs for a normal life. After discovering her transmutation powers, she is transferred back to public school for failing class. As she attempts to become a hero, she encounters a homeless Brandyworth, who reveals her origins as a government project and warns her not to use her powers. She later battles a group of deformed children that the government created amidst failed attempts at recreating her. After the children die, Erickson captures Eve, Brandyworth, and Polly, intending to use them to create better weapons. In the ensuing fight, Erickson kills Brandyworth and Polly. Enraged, Eve overcomes the mental barrier that prevented her from transmuting living material and erases Erickson's memories. She returns home to find her adoptive parents upset with her for not being normal.
Part 1
10	1	"A Lesson for Your Next Life"	Sol Choi	Simon Racioppa	November 3, 2023
On a devastated alternate Earth where Mark sided with Nolan, scientist Angstrom Levy escapes through a portal. One month after Nolan's departure, Mark continues to struggle with his father's betrayal while performing his duties as Invincible. Cecil appoints the revived Immortal to succeed Rudy as the Guardians' leader and adds a new hero called Bulletproof to their ranks. The Maulers escape prison with help from Angstrom, who tasks them with building a device capable of transferring the memories of various alternate universe variants of himself to him so he can use their collective knowledge to advance Earth's technology and save other planets. Cecil sends Mark to stop the Maulers as they begin the process, forcing Angstrom to use his multiversal powers to summon variants of the Maulers, who nearly kill Mark. Angstrom stops the transfer prematurely, causing an explosion, with one Mauler, Mark, and a mutated Angstrom surviving. Driven mad by his variants' memories of their versions of Invincible and Omni-Man, Angstrom vows revenge on Mark and escapes.
11	2	"In About Six Hours, I Lose My Virginity to a Fish"	Ian Abando	Matt Lambert	November 10, 2023
While graduating, Mark defeats Doc Seismic and his Magmanites. Over the summer, tension grows between him and Debbie after she realizes he is only continuing his work as Invincible and working for Cecil to avoid Nolan's legacy. She confronts Cecil, during which she learns Donald is alive and later has a breakdown over continuous reminders of Nolan. After converting a vacant lot into a park, Eve argues with her father, believing he cannot accept that she can help with her powers. However, the park collapses due to being built on unstable ground, though no casualties were sustained. The stowaway Martian, who had taken the place of astronaut Rus Livingston, becomes inspired by original Guardian member Martian Man to become the superhero Shapesmith and join the current Guardians. After encountering and defeating Darkwing II, Mark is assigned by Cecil to appease the Atlanteans for original Guardian member Aquarus' death. Amidst a trial by combat, Mark battles a kaiju, but is injured by its roar. Nonetheless, he saves the Atlanteans from it against Cecil's orders. Angstrom travels to an alternate Earth where Mark was captured by the GDA to gain information on how to defeat his own.
12	3	"This Missive, This Machination!"	Tanner Johnson	Adria Lang	November 17, 2023
In flashbacks, Allen's homeworld of Unopa is attacked by the Viltrumites, leading to his people joining the Coalition to stop them and breeding him to become the strongest Unopan. In the present, Allen discusses his findings from Earth with the Coalition, explaining that Mark is unaffiliated with Viltrum and Nolan left Earth. Despite several members' skepticism, Coalition leader Thaedus supports Allen, believing they possess an advantage, before secretly tasking him with uncovering a Viltrumite mole within their ranks. Later, Allen is attacked by three Viltrumites demanding information on Mark, Earth, and Nolan. While Allen is recovering, Thaedus secretly ends his life support. Concurrently, Mark attends college and meets a shapeshifting insectoid alien from the planet Thraxa who claims his people are in danger. Upon arriving on Thraxa, Mark is unexpectedly reunited with Nolan, who has become Thraxa's ruler. Debbie joins a support group for superhero spouses, only to be accosted by original Guardian member Green Ghost's widower, Theo, for being previously married to Omni-Man, and leaves in shame.
13	4	"It's Been a While"	Jason Zurek	Helen Leigh	November 24, 2023
In flashbacks, Nolan flies aimlessly through space after abandoning Earth. While contemplating suicide at a black hole, he instead saves a Thraxan ship from it and is made their ruler. In the present, Mark's lingering anger towards Nolan is worsened when he learns of Nolan's new Thraxan wife, Andressa, and their child. Understanding his son's feelings, Nolan nonetheless asks for his help in protecting Thraxa, but three Viltrumite soldiers arrive. As he takes Andressa and her son to safety, Mark learns from her that Nolan truly regrets his actions and loves him. The Graysons defeat the soldiers but are grievously wounded. Nolan is subsequently captured and taken back to Viltrum to be executed, while Kregg, a high-ranking Viltrumite general, tasks Mark with finishing Nolan's original mission of preparing Earth for their invasion, or else they will destroy it. Meanwhile, Debbie accepts that her relationship with Nolan was a lie, stops accepting his income through Cecil, and throws out his books. Elsewhere, Donald discovers evidence of his own death. Suspicious that he might not be human, he stabs himself in the forearm as a test. Initially relieved to draw red blood, he then notices that he has bent the knife's tip.
Part 2
14	5	"This Must Come as a Shock"	Haylee Herrick	Helen Leigh	March 14, 2024
Following the Viltrumites' attack, Mark spends two months helping Thraxa rebuild before returning to Earth with his brother. At the GDA, Donald confronts Cecil about his body. Cecil reveals he successfully recovered Donald's brain and placed it in a robotic endoskeleton. The Guardians discover a Martian ship bound for Earth, prompting Shapesmith to reveal his identity and the impending Sequid invasion. After Eve recommits to heroism with Rex's encouragement, she and Mark are recruited by Cecil to join most of the Guardians in thwarting the invasion, but they are overwhelmed. Concurrently, remaining Guardian members Rex Splode, Dupli-Kate, and Shrinking Rae confront the Lizard League after they capture a military base to ransom its nuclear missiles, resulting in Kate's apparent death, Rae getting devoured by Komodo Dragon, and Rex losing a hand and getting shot by King Lizard. Despite Thaedus ending his life support, Allen recovers from his injuries and has become as strong as a Viltrumite. Thaedus reveals he is a rebel Viltrumite and tasks Allen with recruiting Mark to aid the Coalition against the Viltrum Empire.
15	6	"It's Not That Simple"	Sol Choi	Vivian Lee	March 21, 2024
Rex survives being shot and defeats King Lizard before he and Rae are recovered and treated for their injuries. The Guardians narrowly escape the Sequids and rescue the real Rus. Debbie decides to raise Mark's half-brother and names him Oliver. Despite her suspicions of Cecil, she accepts a nanny he hired to help take care of him. Rick recovers from being a Reaniman, but remains traumatized by the ordeal. Mark and Amber's relationship becomes strained when both realize the toll that Mark's work as Invincible has taken on their lives. Eve's feelings for Mark begin to resurface. While Amber speaks to Eve, Mark talks to Art Rosenbaum, who reveals that Nolan previously wrote several unsuccessful sci-fi novels, which Mark learns potentially reveal Viltrumites' weaknesses. He relays the information to Allen, who tells him about Thaedus and the Coalition's stand against the Viltrum Empire. Rus returns home, but is attacked and re-possessed by a Sequid hidden inside him. A healed and imprisoned Nolan is interrogated by Kregg for his loyalty to Earth. Angstrom returns to his native Earth.
16	7	"I'm Not Going Anywhere"	Ian Abando	Simon Racioppa	March 28, 2024
Mark and Amber attend a comic convention, but he leaves to help Rex. After Cecil puts the Immortal on temporary leave, Rudy returns as the Guardians' leader. Donald discovers that he has died numerous times and that the original ordered the memories to be erased. Nonetheless, he later overcomes the trauma while dissuading Rick from committing suicide. While on a date, Mark is confronted by a Viltrumite named Anissa, who tries to remind him of his mission. When Mark abruptly leaves to save a cruise ship from a kaiju, Anissa joins him and effortlessly kills it, saving the passengers. Despite proving Earth's weakness, Anissa fails to convince Mark and severely beats him before ultimately sparing him and leaving to report back to Kregg. Amidst this, the Viltrumites confront a passing Allen, who feigns defeat and allows himself to be captured. After breaking up with Amber, Mark is called by Angstrom, who has taken Debbie and Oliver hostage.
17	8	"I Thought You Were Stronger"	Tanner Johnson	Robert Kirkman	April 4, 2024
Mark returns home to confront Angstrom, who sends Mark across the multiverse to weaken him. Debbie tries to convince Angstrom to let Mark go, but he refuses. She attacks Angstrom, who breaks her arm and beats her. Mark returns and, enraged by his mother's injuries, battles Angstrom across multiple dimensions before furiously pummeling him, accidentally stranding himself in a desolate dimension. Distraught by his actions, Mark is eventually found and sent home by a future incarnation of the Guardians from his own dimension. Before Mark leaves, the future Eve confesses her feelings to him. The Immortal discovers that the original Kate is alive and in hiding and reunites with her while two archaeologists uncover the tomb of Ka-Hor. At the urging of Eve's future self, Mark meets with Eve, but is unable to admit his feelings for her. Allen is sent to a Viltrumite prison where Nolan is being held, and proposes that he join the fight against them. Nolan admits guilt for his actions and that he misses his wife, Debbie.

== Cast and characters ==
=== Main ===
- Steven Yeun as Markus "Mark" Grayson / Invincible
- Sandra Oh as Debbie Grayson
- J. K. Simmons as Nowl-Ahn / Nolan Grayson / Omni-Man

=== Recurring ===
- Gillian Jacobs as Samantha Eve Wilkins / Atom Eve
- Andrew Rannells as William Francis Clockwell
- Zazie Beetz as Amber Justine Bennett
- Walton Goggins as Cecil Stedman
- Seth Rogen as Allen the Alien
- Sterling K. Brown as Angstrom Levy
- Ross Marquand as The Immortal, Rudy Connors (clone), various others
- Malese Jow as Kate Cha / Dupli-Kate
- Mark Hamill as Arthur "Art" Rosenbaum
- Chris Diamantopoulos as Donald Ferguson, Doc Seismic, various others
- Kevin Michael Richardson as Mauler Twins, Amanda / Monster Girl (monster)
- Fred Tatasciore as Killcannon, Adam Wilkins, various others
- Eric Bauza as D.A. Sinclair
- Jason Mantzoukas as Rex Sloan / Rex Splode
- Khary Payton as Markus Grimshaw / Black Samson, various others
- Zachary Quinto as Rudy Connors / Robot
- Grey Griffin as Amanda / Monster Girl, Rachel / Shrinking Rae
- Ben Schwartz as Shapesmith
- Jay Pharoah as Bulletproof
- Calista Flockhart as April Howsam

=== Guest ===
- Tatiana Maslany as Telia, Queen Aquaria
- Cleveland Berto as Darkwing II
- Scoot McNairy as King Lizard
- Peter Cullen as Thaedus
- Chris Diamantopoulos as Vidor
- Phil LaMarr as Lucan
- Ella Purnell as Jane
- Chloe Bennet as Riley
- Cliff Curtis as Paul
- Fred Tatasciore as Giant
- Josh Keaton as Agent Spider
- Paul F. Tompkins as Narrator
- Grey Griffin as Thula
- Clancy Brown as Kregg
- Shantel VanSanten as Anissa
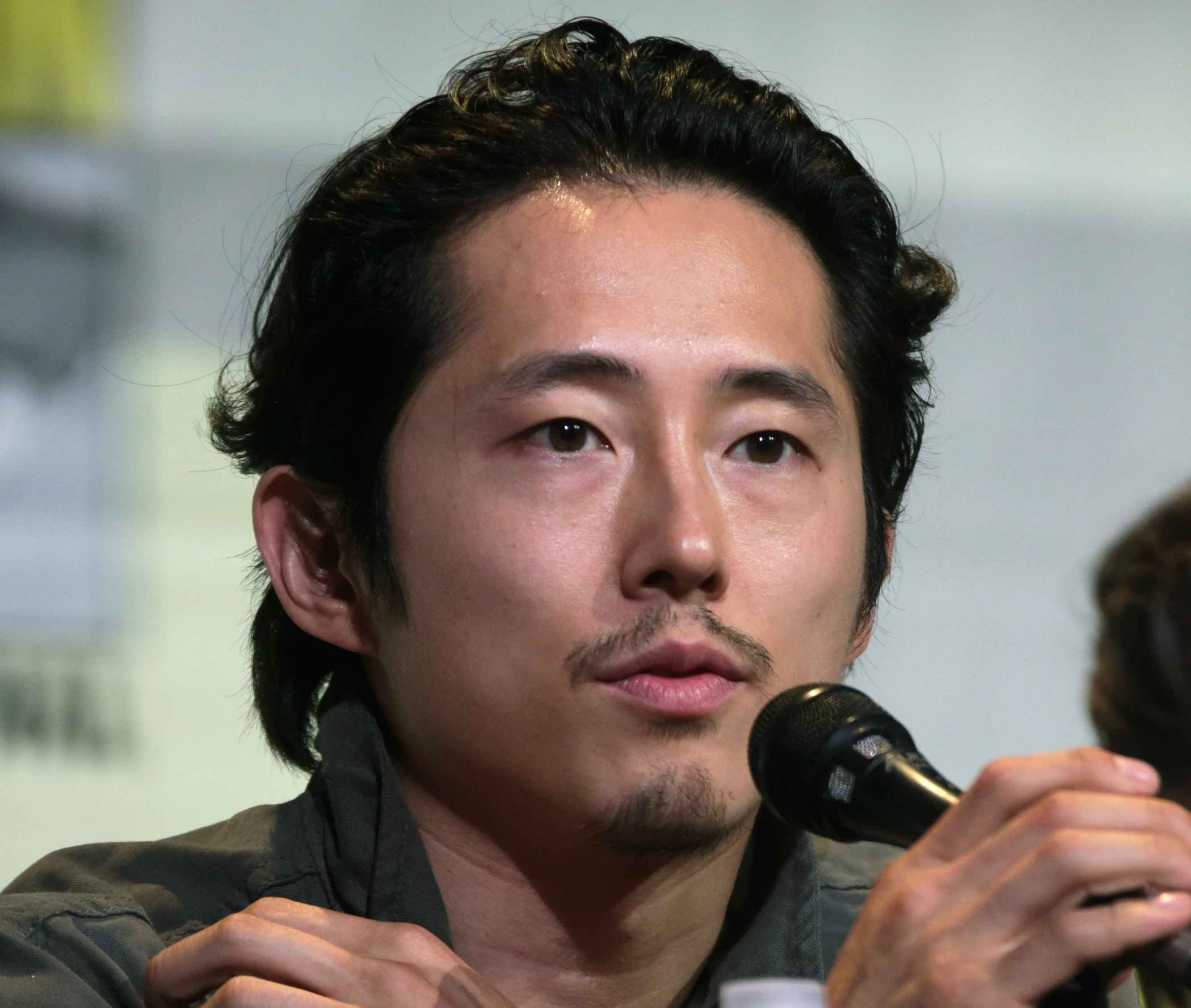
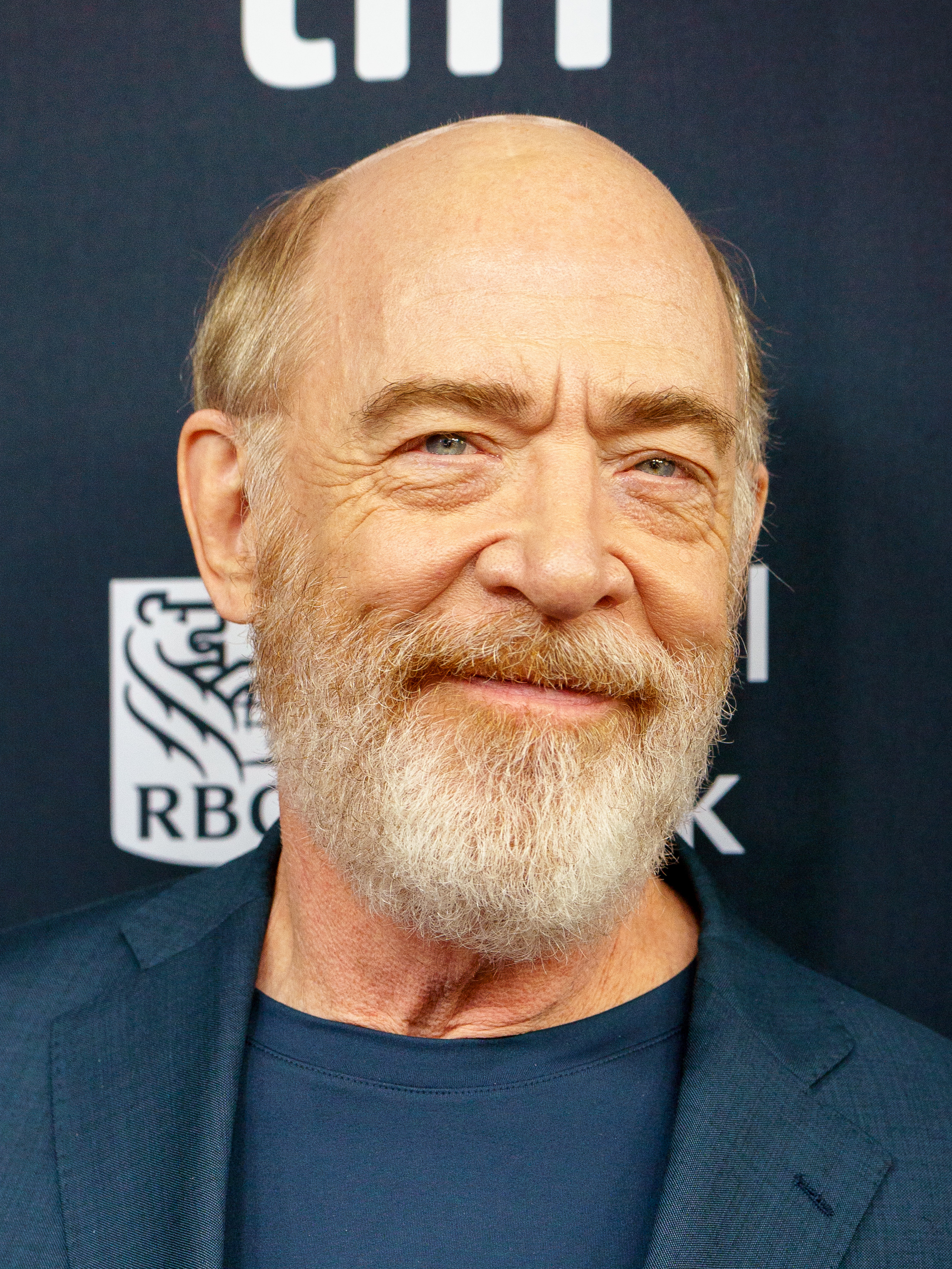
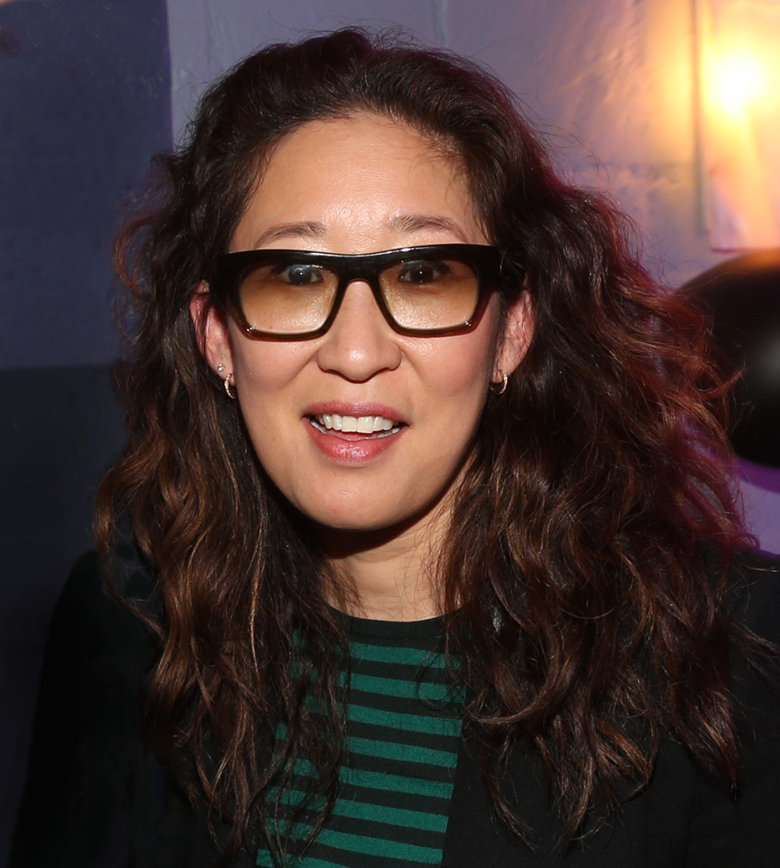
Steven Yeun (Invincible (character)), JK Simmons (Omni-Man), and Sandra Oh (Debbie Grayson)

== Production ==
=== Development ===
Avatar of Robert Kirkman

Robert Kirkman
(@Robert Kirkman)
tweeted:

Hey @InvincibleHQ fans! @steveyeun & I have some potentially exciting news to share about season 2 and...

Apr 29, 2021

In April 2021, Amazon and Robert Kirkman, alongside Steven Yeun, announced that Invincible was renewed for an 8-episode second and third season, which is produced by Skybound and executive produced by Kirkman, Simon Racioppa, David Alpert, and Catherine Winder. Jeff Allen and Linda Lamontagne are serving as the casting director.

The concept for the second season was developed during the scripting phase. Some scenes drew partial inspiration from elements in Spider-Man. Racioppa noted that the trilogy frequently influenced the writing process. Beyond the visual spectacle of the protagonist’s abilities, Raimi’s films emphasized the internal conflict of Peter Parker and the personal consequences of his relationship with Mary Jane Watson. The season was developed with the intention of presenting new material rather than revisiting earlier storylines, as the first season. The creative team also structured the opening episode to quickly reestablish the series’ intensity, aiming to draw audiences back into the narrative following the gap between seasons.

Unlike the first season, the second season places greater thematic focus on Mark’s fear of becoming like his father. Rather than concentrating primarily on his development as a superhero, the season explores his anxiety over the possibility that he may share the same nature and ultimately follow a similar path. This concern becomes a central element of his character arc throughout the season.

=== Casting ===
The season featured all series regulars, all of whom returned from the previous season. Steven Yeun continued to recur as Invincible, Sandra Oh returned to reprising her role as Debbie Grayson. Actors J. K. Simmons, Gillian Jacobs, Zazie Beetz, and Walton Goggins also returned during the season, reprising their roles as Omni-Man, Kumiko, Atom Eve, Amber Bennett, and Cecil Stedman, respectively.

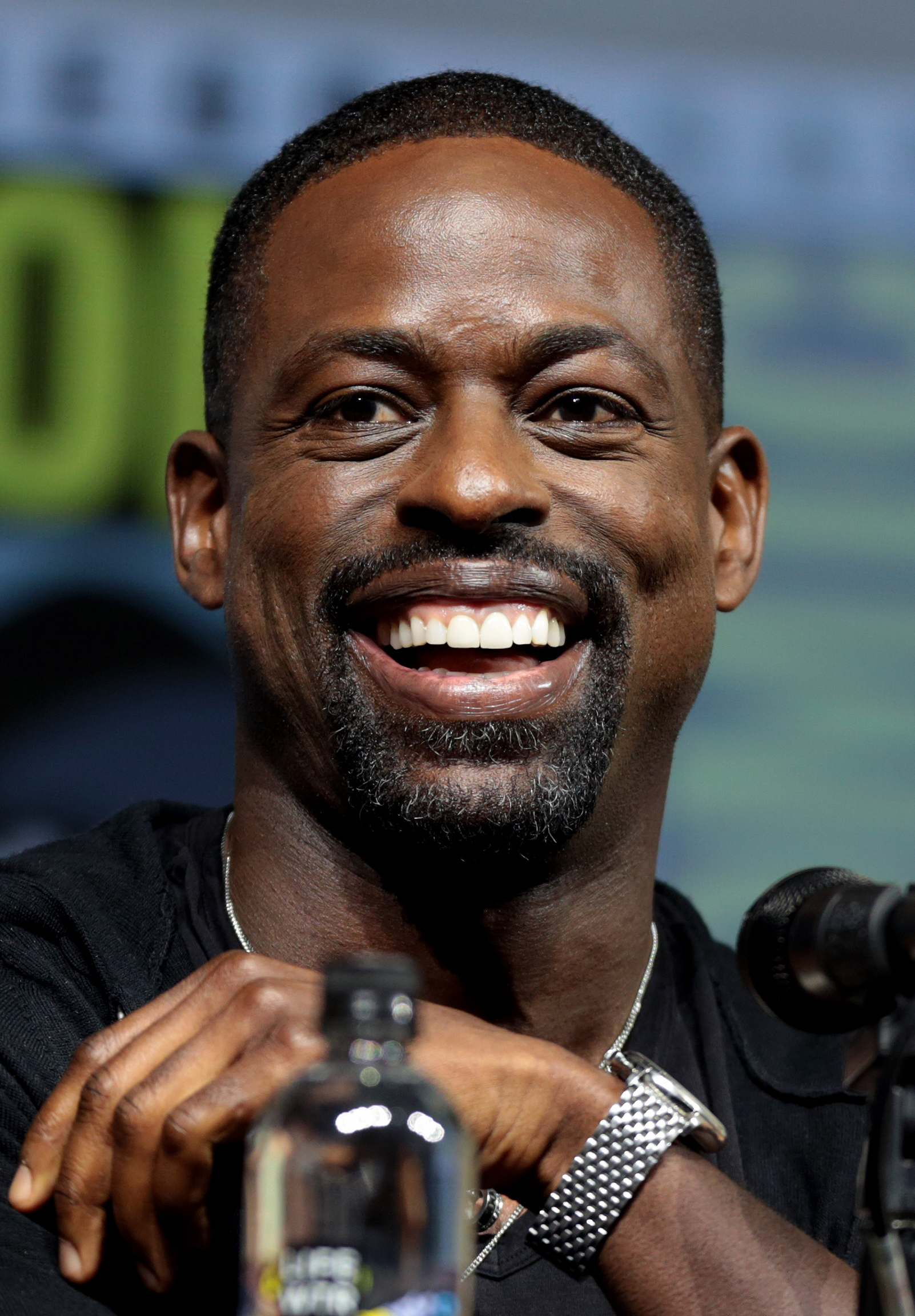
Sterling K. Brown voices Angstrom Levy, a superhuman who possesses the ability to traverse alternate dimensions

The season also introduces new characters. Among the new characters introduced in the season is Sterling K. Brown, who provides the voice for Angstrom Levy, a supervillain who has the power of dimensional travel. Jay Pharoah is also introduced in the season as Bulletproof, a member of the Guardians of the Globe, who has the power of invincibility and flying. Ben Schwartz is introduced in the season as Shapesmith, a Martian who has the power of shapeshifting. Other new characters introduced in the season include Clancy Brown, who plays the role of General Kregg, a general in the Viltrumite army, and Shantel VanSanten, who plays the role of Anissa, a Viltrumite warrior. Seth Rogen reprises his role as Allen the Alien, while Michael Dorn reprises his role as Battle Beast.

=== Writing ===
The writing of the second season continued to follow the character-centric approach that was established in the first season. This was according to Racioppa, the co-showrunner of the series. This approach ensured that the writers explored different ways to reach the key points that were established while ensuring that the overall direction of the season was maintained. The series continued to incorporate elements from the comic series that was originally written by Kirkman.

The storyline of the second season of the series focuses on the aftermath of the finale of the first season. This season explored the impact that the actions of Omni-Man had on the character of Mark Grayson and Debbie Grayson. The impact of the actions that occurred in the first season was explored realistically. The introduction of new characters to the series continued. This includes the character of Angstrom Levy. This character’s multiverse-related abilities were explored to ensure that the character’s storyline could be maintained.

We're always like, 'What are the real reactions?' or 'What really would happen in the scenario if you had these super-powered characters ... fighting someone who's not superpowered?' Like, they would explode, if [they] got hit. If Superman punched you, you would explode.

— Racioppa on R-rating scene.

The season's R-rating, received some criticism from viewers, which showrunner Simon Racioppa addressed in a November 2023 interview with The Direct.

Racioppa explained that the increased violence and gore compared to Season 1 were intentional but not gratuitous, emphasizing that character development and narrative conflict remained the primary focus. He noted that this approach allowed the action scenes to escalate naturally, with emotional stakes driving the intensity of the violence.

=== Animation ===
The production faced challenges due to the COVID-19 pandemic, which caused delays and required the team to rebuild and restart the "factory" of the show.

The second season of Invincible mostly consists of hand-drawn 2D animation. The production team reduced the use of CGI, opting for more traditional hand-drawn animation methods. This type of animation was chosen for the show due to the large number of characters in the series and the numerous action-packed scenes. Marge Dean, Head of Animation at Skybound Entertainment, noted, "Quite a lot [of CG animation] was used in Season 1... We still use an element of CG... but, ultimately, the background is drawn into the animation."

The animation for the show is done in collaboration with studios in South Korea by Skybound Entertainment. The animation is created through storyboards, animatics, and model sheets. Computer-generated imagery is used minimally for the backgrounds. Other objects in the 2D animation are created through computer-generated imagery.

Fight scenes in the show have been complex, as have the destruction of objects and injuries to the characters. Scenes involving the multiverse and Angstrom Levy have been diverse in their settings and color schemes.

=== Sound and music ===
The audio design of season two was handled by the Boom Box Post team under supervising sound editor Brad Meyer and re-recording mixers Jeff Shiffman and Jacob Cook and was assisted by several sound editors and foley artists. Season 2 focused on dense immersion audio, with dense, powerful hits for action scenes and close-up sound for calmer scenes. To make superhero combat more substantial, the team laid down an 808 kick drum and cannon-style explosions over the hits and added subtle touches like Omni-Man's cape flowing in time with his combat choreography. Foley effects were also performed for the series, such as cloth noise, footsteps, and wet sounds, to add realism to action and gore-ridden scenes.

The crew also created distinctive sound effects for telepathic sequences, including a mental conversation between Omni-Man and Allen the Alien, and experimented with layered sounds for the techno-organic Viltrumite warriors by adding metal fragments with human-like characteristics to reflect their half-human origin.

Raveena Aurora returned to compose the score for the second season. In 2023, The Royals and Radiohead were also confirmed to contribute to the soundtrack. The season's soundtrack features several artists, including Chair Model, Speelburg, Mac Albrecht & Orchestre Philharmonique de Strasbourg, RF Shannon, Julianna Barwick, Nick Cave, Blondshell, Zoe Boekbinder, Run the Jewels, N3W N3W & SYDNY, Olivia Wendel, Bad Nerves, Aidan Knight, Woolly Music, That Kid CG, K-Lab, d4vd, Ethel Cain, Fatboy Slim, and Michael Kiwanuka.

All music is composed by Various artists.

Track listing
No.	Title	Length
1.	"Karma Police" (Radiohead)	4:24
2.	"Hey You" (Chair Model)	2:29
3.	"Truly.Modern.Love" (The Royals)	3:31
4.	"Headaches" (Raveena Aurora)	5:12
5.	"When You Want Me" (Speelburg)	3:53
6.	"Till Eulenspiegels lustige" (Mac Albrecht & & Orchestre Philharmonique de Strasbourg)	15:04
7.	"Ballad of a Thin Place" (RF Shannon)	4:16
8.	"Forever" (Julianna Barwick)	3:42
9.	"Avalanche" (Nick Cave and the Bad Seeds)	5:09
10.	"Olympus" (Blondshell)	3:37
11.	"I am Yesterday" (Zoe Boekbinder)	3:37
12.	"The Ground Below" (Run the Jewels)	2:32
13.	"One of a Kind" (N3W N3W & SYDNY)	2:22
14.	"Baby Drummer" (Bad Nerves)	2:21
15.	"Dream Team" (Aidan Knight)	7:07
16.	"Wild and Free" (That Kid CG)	2:21
17.	"Like a Friend" (Pulp)	4:31
18.	"Feel It" (d4vd)	2:38
19.	"Televangelism" (Ethel Cain)	3:03
20.	"Weapon of Choice" (Fatboy Slim)	3:40
Total length:		1:14:08

== Release ==
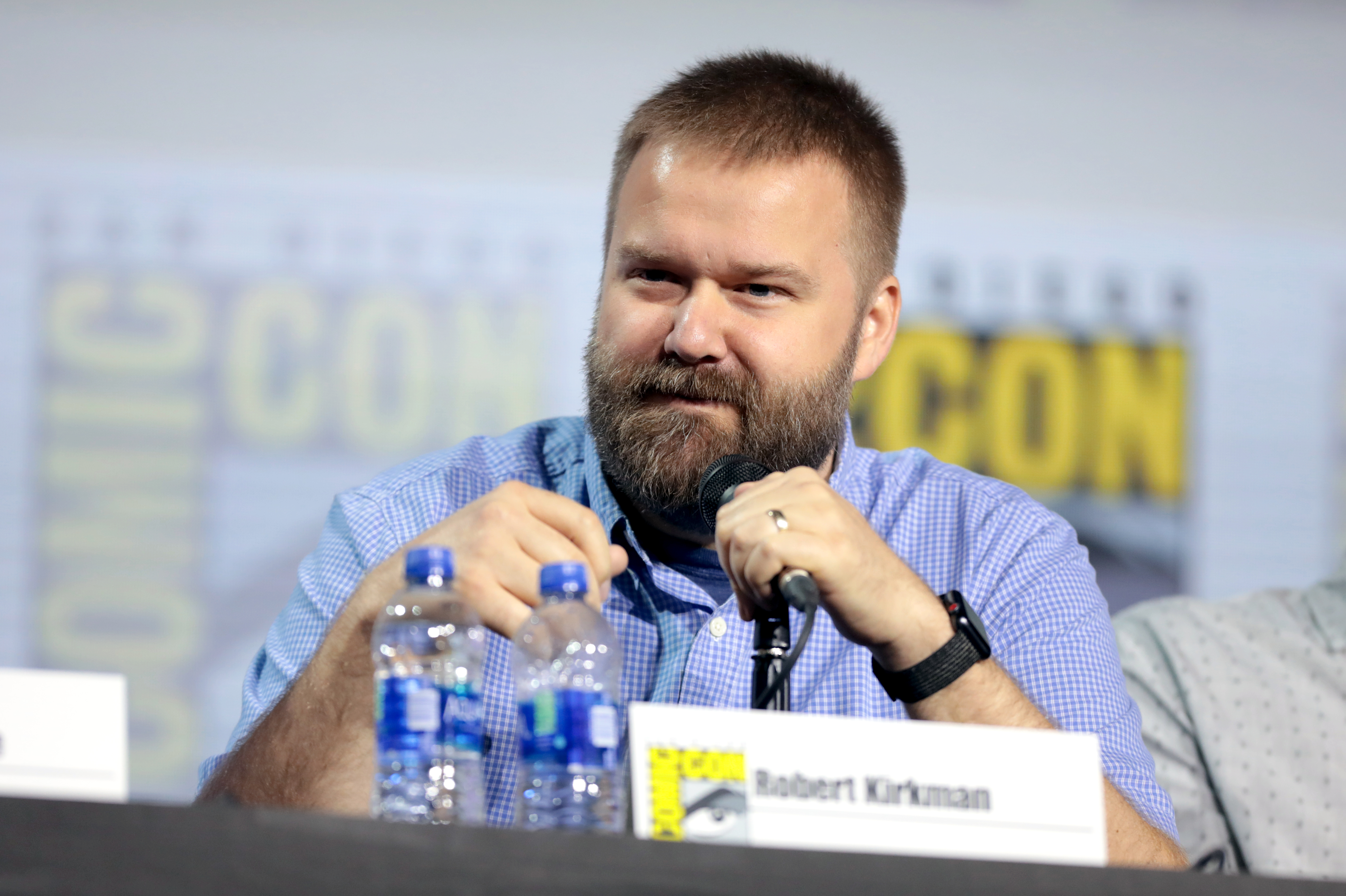
Robert Kirkman At San Diego Comic-Con.

The second season of Invincible was released in two parts on Amazon Prime Video. The first part premiered on November 3, 2023, with subsequent episodes released weekly until November 24, 2023. The second part began on March 14, 2024, and concluded on April 4, 2024. During San Diego Comic-Con on July 21, 2023, a trailer for the second season was shown, after which it was announced that a special episode, called "Invincible: Atom Eve", would release later that day.

The show experienced a mid-season hiatus, a move that was not part of the original production plan. Co-showrunner Simon Racioppa confirmed that this pause was necessitated by release setbacks. Adding a creative layer to the decision, creator Robert Kirkman revealed that the mid-season break was also deliberately planned around the holiday season. This allowed viewers time to reflect on the main plot developments and ensured the show would maintain visibility during a period saturated with many other major new releases.

Because the show was airing weekly, a strategy used to promote subscriptions to Amazon Prime Video, a delay in its initial starting date would have pushed the final four episodes into the Christmas period. Amazon sought to avoid this overlap so they could instead focus on promoting their slate of original Christmas films and shows.

== Reception ==
=== Audience viewership ===
Viewership data for the second season increased substantially compared to its first season, with reports indicating that the season premiere attracted approximately three times the opening weekend audience of the first season.

=== Critical response ===
The review aggregator website Rotten Tomatoes calculated that 100% approval rating based on 42 reviews were positive and the average rating for the season was 8.4 out of 10. The website's critics consensus reads, "Still as bracing as a punch to the face and invigorating with its vivid worldbuilding, Invincible is practically impervious to disappointing audiences in this sterling sophomore season."

Invincible season 2's second season received generally positive responses. Logan Moore of ComicBook.com notes, "Invincible continues to be one of the best and most unique superhero shows around." Screen Rant's Cooper Hood described Invincible Season 2 as "worth the wait" However, he criticized the split release for creating uneven pacing and found the use of Angstrom Levy as the main antagonist in Part 1 somewhat disappointing.

Leila Latif of The Guardian gave the season five out of five stars, describing it as “the best superhero show on television.” She praised its character development, writing, and animation, calling it “a triumph” for its performances, humor, and action. Saloni Gajjar of The A.V. Club wrote that Season 2, Part 2 features strong action and key plot developments appealing to both new viewers and comic fans. She commended the animation and its balance between violence and character-driven storytelling, noting Mark Grayson’s continued moral struggles. Charles Pulliam-Moore, of The Verge, reviewed the second season of Invincible as a thoughtful step toward a bigger universe. In his review, Pulliam-Moore discusses how the season aligns with Hollywood's current interest in multiverse narratives, while staying true to its comic book origins. He notes that the series expands its universe thoughtfully, introducing new characters and plotlines that enrich the overarching story. Pulliam-Moore also comments on the show's animation quality and its approach to balancing action with character development. Overall, he views the second season as a significant progression that sets the stage for future developments in the series.

Sam Stone of Comic Book Resources gave season 9 a grade of out of 10, appreciating more emphasis on emotional character development, especially the trauma and guilt of Mark Grayson following the first season. He also mentioned its responsibility and heroism cost themes compared to Spider-Man's storyline. Stone also stated that he appreciated the animation, the voice acting, and the fuller character development, and felt that the season achieves the action and emotion in proportion.

IGN's reviewed Siddhant Adlakha noted its depth of emotion and character development in the season, praising how its combination of action and introspection delivered something different. He listed dynamics among Nolan, Debbie, and Mark as one of the season's strongest points and felt that despite some unbalanced moments in the story, it worked best when trying to balance the family dynamics.

=== Accolades ===
Sterling K. Brown received a nomination for Outstanding Character Voice-Over Performance at the 76th Primetime Creative Arts Emmy Awards for his portrayal of Angstrom Levy in the episode "I Thought You Were Stronger".

Additionally, the season was nominated for Best Animated Series at the 2025 Critics' Choice Television Awards. The series also earned a nomination for Outstanding Achievement for Storyboarding in an Animated Television/Broadcast Production at the 2025 Annie Awards.

List of accolades received by Invicible Season 2
Year	Award	Category	Result
2024	76th Primetime Creative Arts Emmy Awards	Outstanding Character Voice-Over Performance - Sterling K. Brown	Nominated
2025	Critics' Choice Television Awards	Best Animated Series	Nominated
2025	Annie Awards	Outstanding Achievement for Storyboarding	Nominated
