= What Have I Done? (Invincible) =

- Invincible episode
- Episode no.: Season 3 Episode 7
- Directed by: Haylee Herrick
- Written by: Robert Kirkman
- Based on: Volume 12: Still Standing (Issues #60-61)
- Original release date: March 6, 2025
- Running time: 54 minutes

Additional cast
- Angstrom Levy (voiced by Sterling K. Brown); The Technicians (voiced by Doug Bradley); Oliver Grayson (voiced by Christian Convery); Ka-Hor (voiced by Clancy Brown); Brit (voiced by Jonathan Banks); Conquest (voiced by Jeffrey Dean Morgan)

Episode chronology
← Previous "All I Can Say Is I'm Sorry"	Next → "I Thought You'd Never Shut Up"
- Invincible season 3

"What Have I Done?" is the seventh episode of the third season of the American adult animated superhero television series Invincible, based on the comic book series of the same name by Robert Kirkman, Cory Walker, and Ryan Ottley. Written by Robert Kirkman and directed by Haylee Herrick, Dan Duncan and Shaun O'Neil, the episode adapts elements of the "Invincible War" storyline from the original comic volume Still Standing, notably issue #60, and is noted for its large-scale action, emotional depth, and significant plot developments.

The episode is structured into four segments—labeled "Day One," "Day Two," "Day Three," and "End of the War" depicting the rapid escalation and resolution of the "Invincible War" within a single 50-minute episode. This format, inspired by the comic’s issues #60 and #61 where the war unfolds across four chaotic days, expands the timeline across three days and a concluding aftermath.

The episode premiered on Amazon Prime Video on March 6, 2025, as part of the season's weekly release schedule following a three-episode premiere on February 6, 2025.

== Plot ==
In a flashback, Angstrom Levy is saved and nursed back to health by a trio of advanced cybernetic surgeons called the "Technicians" following his presumed death at the hands of Mark Grayson / Invincible. (Note: As depicted in the second season episode "I Thought You Were Stronger" (2024)) In the present, Angstrom uses his multiversal powers to summon 18 evil alternate variants of Invincible from across the multiverse and has them wreak havoc on Mark's Earth to tarnish Mark's reputation. Mark arrives at Payton Penitentiary and engages one of the variants, Mohawk Invincible, whom he knocks unconscious. Scott Duvall / Powerplex, a supervillain Mark recently defeated, (Note: As depicted in the third season episode "All I Can Say Is I'm Sorry" (2025)) escapes in the chaos. Over his mother Debbie's protests, Mark's half-brother Oliver joins the fight while Global Defense Agency (GDA) director Cecil Stedman rallies more heroes to face the threat and prepares undead cyborgs called "Reanimen" to provide further aid.

As the war intensifies, Mark and his girlfriend Atom Eve try to deduce who is behind the attacks. Mark says that the only person capable is Angstrom, but he still believes Angstrom is dead. The pair fights Veil Invincible and Omni-Invincible before she is injured by Omni-Invincible, leading to Mark prioritizing her over the battle. Cecil deploys Reanimen to save Mark and Eve while Veil Invincible and Omni-Invincible escapes. The Guardians of the Globe are severely injured fighting No Goggles Invincible before Guardians member Darkwing II drags him into another dimension called the Shadowverse, with both being presumed dead. Former Guardian Rex Splode sacrifices himself to kill Goggles Invincible and cover his friends Amanda / Monster Girl, Bulletproof, and Rudy Connors / Robot's escape. During a montage of events, Powerplex kills Veil Invincible, Oliver kills Long hair Invincible, and Tech Jacket kills Mustache Invincible.

On the third day of their attack, Angstrom orders the remaining eight variants to gather above Mark's house for the second phase of his plan. Capevincible refuses, saying that Angstrom’s plan got most of them killed, and the variants unite against Angstrom, telling him they will torture and kill him if he doesn’t give them what they want. Angstrom strands them in a desolate dimension. Mark faces Angstrom, who briefly overpowers him with a multitude of drones before Mark subdues him. Oliver arrives to convince Mark to kill Angstrom, arguing that he is too dangerous to be kept alive. However, Angstrom flees, with Mark accidentally tearing his arm off in the process. Angstrom orders the Technicians to fix his arm but they refuse, saying Angstrom has not honoured their deal and that he works for them now, threatening him with death if he refuses.

In the aftermath of the war, Scott charges at Mark again out of his previous grief, but Mark and Oliver subdue his powers, and he is arrested again. As Scott is taken away, publicly declaring Mark is to blame for the destruction, Mark reflects on its heavy toll and how public trust in him has been shaken. As he assists in rescue and recovery efforts, an aged Viltrumite envoy named Conquest arrives and expresses disappointment in Mark's lack of progress in subjugating Earth for the Viltrum Empire. Devastated and enraged by the destruction directed at him, Mark charges at Conquest to vent his rage.

== Production ==
=== Casting ===
Steven Yeun leads the episode as Mark Grayson / Invincible in the episode, portraying 18 alternate versions of the character, each distinguished by unique vocal inflections. His performance, which includes variants such as a Mohawk-wearing Invincible and one in an Omni-Man-inspired suit, was noted as a highlight.

External videos
- Episode 7... it was a masterpiece, Robert. Complete. Comprehensive, a promotional video introducing the episode's "What Have I Done?" concept with narration by Robert Kirkman, Cory Walker, and Ryan Ottley, video from the Invincible Twitter account

The episode sees the return of Sterling K. Brown as Angstrom Levy, whose multiversal attack drives the central conflict. The supporting cast includes Gillian Jacobs as Atom Eve, Walton Goggins as Cecil Stedman, and Zachary Quinto as Rudy Connors / Robot. Ross Marquand reprises his roles as The Immortal and Rudy Connors / Robot (unmasked), while Jason Mantzoukas voices Rex Splode. Grey DeLisle and Chris Diamantopoulos also return as Shrinking Rae and Donald Ferguson, respectively.

Several new and returning characters appear during the multiversal battle, including Silver Age-inspired heroes. The episode also features Jeffrey Dean Morgan as Conquest, Jonathan Banks as Brit, Aaron Paul as Powerplex, and Chloe Bennet as Riley, the tomb raider. Clancy Brown voices Ka-Hor, Doug Bradley as voices of The Technicians, and Gary Anthony Williams as the voice of a news anchor. Additional voices include Fred Tatasciore as Adam, and Misty Lee and Jordan Reynolds in various supporting roles.

=== Music ===
A standout track featured in this episode is "When the Party's Over" a 2018 single by American singer-songwriter Billie Eilish from her debut album When We All Fall Asleep, Where Do We Go? (2019), written and produced by her brother Finneas O'Connell. The song, a minimalist piano ballad with choral influences, plays during a pivotal sequence in the episode, enhancing its emotional weight. It accompanies the aftermath of Rex Splode’s sacrificial death on "Day II," where he detonates himself to defeat Retro Invincible, saving Robot and others at the Teen Team base. As the soft melody contrasts the preceding violence, the scene depicts a ruined world strewn with bodies, amplifying the sense of loss and emptiness.

== Release ==
"What Have I Done?" premiered on Prime Video in the United States on March 6, 2025. This episode serves as the penultimate installment of the season, leading up to the finale released on March 13, 2025.

== Reception ==
=== Critical response ===
"What Have I Done?" received widespread critical acclaim for its ambitious scope, emotional resonance, and adaptation of the "Invincible War" arc. Lewis Glazebrook of Screen Rant hails the episode as one of the best to date in the series, applauding its gripping action sequences and well-executed character arcs. He highlights its adaptation of the Invincible War storyline, in which Mark Grayson faces off against 18 sinister versions of himself from alternate realities. Glazebrook praises the show's ability to faithfully bring this complex narrative from the comics to life, crafting a visually striking and emotionally impactful experience. Additionally, he underscores the episode's darker tone, describing it as one of the most intense in the series. He commends how these high-stakes moments elevate the overall story, pushing characters to their breaking points while setting up future plot developments.

David Kaldor of Bubbleblabber highlighted the brutality of the "Invincible War" arc, noting the significant character developments and the high stakes involved. Phil Weaver of Only Comic Universe praised the episode for its intense storytelling and the depiction of alternate versions of Mark causing widespread destruction, culminating in a teaser reminiscent of Thanos. Siddhant Adlakha of IGN rated "What Have I Done?" eight out of ten, praising its ambitious scope and Steven Yeun's versatile performance but critiquing its narrative shortcomings. He described the episode as "messy but thrilling," highlighting Yeun's portrayal of 18 evil Invincibles with distinct vocal variations. Adlakha commended the "vicious and intense" action, likening it to Dragon Ball Z, and appreciated reveals like Angstrom Levy's survival. However, he criticized the episode's uneven pacing, underdeveloped emotional stakes, and rushed multiversal invasion. Despite these flaws, he found its global spectacle compelling, delivering "powerful moments" within its chaotic execution.

=== Accolades ===
Steven Yeun received an Emmy nomination for Outstanding Character Voice-Over Performance at the 77th Primetime Creative Arts Emmy Awards, for voicing all of the Invincible Variants in the episode "What Have I Done".
