= All I Can Say Is I'm Sorry =

- Invincible episode
- Promotional poster for the episode "All I Can Say Is I'm Sorry"
- Episode no.: Season 3 Episode 6
- Directed by: Jason Zurek; Dan Duncan; Shaun O'Neil
- Written by: Ross Stracke; Simon Racioppa
- Based on: Volume 11: Happy Days (Issue #58-59)
- Original release date: February 27, 2025
- Running time: 54 minutes

Additional cast
- Scott Duvall / Powerplex (voiced by Aaron Paul); Becky Duvall (voiced by Kate Mara); Shrinking Rae (voiced by Grey DeLisle); The Elephant (voiced by John DiMaggio); Samantha Eve Wilkins / Atom Eve (voiced by Gillian Jacobs); Rudy Connors / Robot (voiced by Ross Marquand); Angstrom Levy (voiced by Sterling K. Brown)

Episode chronology
← Previous "This Was Supposed to Be Easy"	Next → "What Have I Done?"
- Invincible season 3

"All I Can Say Is I'm Sorry" is the sixth episode of the third season of the adult animated superhero television series Invincible and the twenty-third episode overall. It premiered on February 27, 2025 on Amazon Prime Video. Directed by Jason Zurek, Dan Duncan, and Shaun O'Neil, it was written by Ross Stracke and Simon Racioppa. Adapting the concluding storyline of the original comic volume Happy Days, the episode introduces a new antagonist, Powerplex (voiced by Aaron Paul), and explores the emotional fallout of Mark Grayson's (voiced by Steven Yeun) actions as the superhero Invincible, particularly the devastation caused during his battle with Omni-Man in the first season finale.

== Plot summary ==
In a flashback, Global Defense Agency (GDA) employee Scott Duvall loses his sister Jessica and niece Gretchen amidst Omni-Man and Mark Grayson / Invincible's battle throughout Chicago. (Note: As depicted in the first season episode "Where I Really Come From".) In the present, Scott, consumed by grief and rage, steals GDA technology to augment his natural ability to convert kinetic energy into electrical energy. Taking the name "Powerplex", he repeatedly terrorizes Chicago in failed attempts at luring and challenging Mark. After defeating Guardians of the Globe member Shapesmith, Scott flees to his wife Becky and son Jack.

Meanwhile, Mark struggles with his role as a superhero and attempting to move forward while grappling with his moral uncertainties. Elsewhere, Rudy Connors builds a device to help his friend Amanda / Monster Girl, whose transformation powers de-ages her body every time she uses them, while Shrinking Rae tells Rex Splode she plans to retire from superhero work. Initially uncertain, feeling that his superhero identity is all he has, Rex ultimately accepts Rae's decision.

Becky convinces a desperate Scott to stage her and Jack's kidnappings to lure Mark into a trap. In the ensuing fight, Scott inadvertently kills his family before Mark defeats him. Devastated by the unintended consequences of his presence, Mark is forced to confront the ripple effects of his existence as a superhero while Scott is taken into GDA custody. Returning home, Mark's girlfriend Atom Eve attempts to console him, but he remains withdrawn.

Concurrently, the supervillain Angstrom Levy, having survived his last encounter with Mark, (Note: As depicted in the second season episode "I Thought You Were Stronger".) uses his multiversal powers to assemble an army of Invincible variants from across the multiverse.

== Production ==
The episode introduces guest star Aaron Paul as Scott Duvall, also known as Powerplex, an antagonist seeking vengeance against Invincible for the loss of his sister and niece during the battle in the first season finale episode "Where I Really Come From" (2021). Kate Mara voices Becky, Scott's supportive yet concerned wife. Mara's portrayal emphasizes the personal costs of vengeance. Khary Payton voices Kyle, Amber's new boyfriend, introducing fresh dynamics to the plot. Payton's extensive voice acting experience enriches the character, contributing to the series' multifaceted narrative.

== Release ==
"All I Can Say Is I'm Sorry" was released on February 27, 2025, as part of Amazon Prime Video's weekly episode rollout. The season premiered on February 6, 2025, with the first three episodes, followed by weekly releases leading up to the finale on March 13, 2025.

== Reception ==
=== Critical response ===
William Hughes of The AV Club noted that the episode benefits from its concentrated storytelling, especially as it delves into one of the series' most significant themes—the consequences of superhuman conflicts on ordinary lives. Phil Weaver of Only Comic Universe gave the episode a nine out of ten, describing it as "a solid and very touching episode." He highlighted the powerful flashback to the Omni-Man and Invincible fight, which seamlessly transitions into the present-day narrative. Siddhant Adlakha of IGN praised "All I Can Say Is I'm Sorry", for its return to impactful storytelling. Adlakha highlighted the episode’s use of a flashback to the large-scale devastation caused by Omni-Man in the first-season finale, noting how it effectively reinforces the emotional and narrative stakes of the series. Adlakha contrasted this approach with the earlier episodes of the third season, which he felt downplayed the consequences of violence. He concluded that the episode successfully restores the emotional weight that has been central to Invincible's appeal.
