= Invincible (TV series) =

Animated superhero television series

- Genre: Action-adventure; Comedy drama; Science fantasy; Superhero
- Created by: Robert Kirkman
- Based on: Invincible by: Robert Kirkman; Cory Walker; Ryan Ottley
- Developed by: Robert Kirkman; Simon Racioppa
- Showrunners: Robert Kirkman; Simon Racioppa
- Voices of: Steven Yeun; Sandra Oh; J. K. Simmons
- Composer: John Paesano
- Country of origin: United States
- Original language: English
- No. of seasons: 4
- No. of episodes: 33

Production
- Executive producers: Robert Kirkman; Catherine Winder; David Alpert; Simon Racioppa; Seth Rogen; Evan Goldberg; Margaret M. Dean
- Producers: Maude Lewis; Dan Duncan; Shaun O'Neil; Marshell Becton
- Running time: 45–55 minutes
- Production companies: Amazon MGM Studios (Note: Credited as Amazon Studios until 2023); Skybound North; Wind Sun Sky Entertainment; Skybound Animation; Point Grey Pictures

Original release
- Network: Amazon Prime Video
- Release: March 25, 2021 – present

Invincible is an American adult animated superhero television series created by Robert Kirkman for the streaming service Amazon Prime Video, based on the Image comic book series of the same name co-created with Cory Walker and Ryan Ottley. It is produced by Skybound Entertainment, Wind Sun Sky Entertainment, Point Grey Pictures, and Amazon MGM Studios. The series follows teenager Mark Grayson, a human-alien hybrid, who becomes a crime-fighting superhero known as "Invincible" under the guidance of his father, Nolan / Omni-Man, the most powerful superhero on the planet. As he adjusts to his new powers, Mark struggles to balance his personal life with his superhero duties and is forced to prove that he can live up to his father, unaware of a conspiracy that threatens the world and leading him to question the true nature of his role. Steven Yeun stars in the series as Mark, alongside J. K. Simmons and Sandra Oh as Mark's father and mother, Nolan and Debbie Grayson, respectively, while the remaining cast members have recurring roles.

Invincible premiered its eight-episode first season across March and April 2021, after which Amazon renewed the series for a second and third season. A prequel special, "Invincible: Atom Eve", was released in July 2023. The eight-episode second season was divided into two parts, first released in November 2023, then across March and April 2024. The eight-episode third season was released across February and March 2025. The eight-episode fourth season was released across March and April 2026. The fifth season is expected to premiere on February 17, 2027. A sixth season has been announced.

The series has received widespread critical acclaim, with praise for its action sequences, story, voice performances (particularly Yeun, Oh, and Simmons), faithfulness to the comics, and emotional weight. It has been nominated for three Primetime Emmy Awards, two Annie Awards and the Critics' Choice Television Award for Best Animated Series.

== Premise ==
Mark Grayson is a seemingly typical teenager whose father, Nolan Grayson, also known as "Omni-Man", is the most powerful superhero on Earth. Shortly after his 17th birthday, Mark begins to develop powers of his own and learns how to wield them to fight injustice as "Invincible", with help from his father. However, his father turns out not to be as heroic as he thought, as he hides a dark secret, which starts to slip when he brutally murders the members of the world's greatest superhero team, the Guardians of the Globe.

== Characters ==
=== Main ===
- Markus "Mark" Grayson / Invincible (voiced by Steven Yeun): The eponymous protagonist. After developing powers inherited from his father, such as super-strength, speed, nigh-invulnerability, slow-aging, and flight at 17 years old, Mark begins to fight evil as a superhero known as "Invincible", while discovering the harsh realities of being a superhero.
- Deborah "Debbie" Grayson (voiced by Sandra Oh): Mark's mother, Nolan's wife, Oliver's stepmother, and an experienced real estate agent who was once long-adjusted to being a superhero's spouse.
- Nolan Grayson / Omni-Man (voiced by J. K. Simmons as an adult, Talon Warburton as a young man): Mark and Oliver's father and Debbie's husband. Born on the planet Viltrum, he arrived on Earth 20 years prior to the series. Omni-Man is considered the most powerful superhero on the planet with a civilian identity of a rich travel writer.

=== Supporting ===
- Samantha Eve Wilkins / Atom Eve / Phase One (voiced by Gillian Jacobs as a teen/young adult, Jazlyn Ione as a preteen, and Aria Kane as a child): A matter/energy manipulating superheroine and Mark's second girlfriend.
- Amber Justine Bennett (voiced by Zazie Beetz): Mark's classmate and first girlfriend.
- William Francis Clockwell (voiced by Andrew Rannells in seasons 1–3, Brandon Scott Jones in season 4): Mark's best friend and civilian confidant.
- Global Defense Agency (GDA): A clandestine organization that organizes global superhero responses and uses advanced technology to expedite their recovery or resuscitation after death.
  - Cecil Stedman (voiced by Walton Goggins): Director of the GDA.
  - Donald Ferguson (voiced by Chris Diamantopoulos): A high-ranking GDA agent.
  - April Howsam (voiced by Calista Flockhart): A GDA agent and caretaker for superhero children.
- Guardians of the Globe (new roster): A group of experienced superheroes with diverse skill sets.
  - The Immortal (voiced by Ross Marquand): A millennia-old superhero and former leader.
  - Markus Grimshaw / Black Samson (voiced by Khary Payton): A veteran hero with super strength whose powers return after a period of loss.
  - Amanda / Monster Girl (voiced by Grey DeLisle in human form, Kevin Michael Richardson in ogre form): A hero who can transform into a monster but becomes younger with each transformation.
  - Rachel / Shrinking Rae (voiced by Grey DeLisle): A size-shifting hero.
  - Zandale Randolph / Bulletproof (voiced by Jay Pharoah): A flying, invulnerable hero.
  - The Shapesmith (voiced by Ben Schwartz): A Martian with shapeshifting abilities who masquerades as a human superhero.
  - Benjamin Taylor / Nightboy / Darkwing II (voiced by Cleveland Berto): A superhero and former sidekick of Darkwing who possesses the ability to transport people to the "shadowverse".
  - Brit (voiced by Jonathan Banks): An invulnerable veteran hero later appointed leader.
- Teen Team: A teenage group of superheroes who later get promoted to the Guardians of the Globe.
  - Rudolph "Rudy / Rex" Connors / Robot (voiced by Zachary Quinto as Rudy's original body and as Robot in seasons 1–3, Ross Marquand as Rudy's cloned body and as Robot in season 4): A highly intelligent scientist who uses a robotic body to overcome his physical deformities.
  - Rex Sloan / Rex Splode (voiced by Jason Mantzoukas): An incorrigible superhero who can charge potential energy into anything he touches to create explosives.
  - Katherine "Kate" Cha / Dupli-Kate (voiced by Malese Jow): A self-replicating superheroine.
- The Mauler Twins (both voiced by Kevin Michael Richardson): Two blue-skinned, hyper-powerful, super-genius superhumans and long-time adversaries of the original Guardians.
- Killcannon (voiced by Fred Tatasciore): A supervillain with an arm-mounted laser cannon.
- Arthur "Art" Rosenbaum (voiced by Mark Hamill): A superhero suit tailor and long-time friend to many superheroes.
- Adam Wilkins (voiced by Fred Tatasciore): Eve's abusive adoptive father who vocally disapproves of her being a superhero and wants her to be normal.
- Elizabeth "Betsy" Wilkins (voiced by Grey DeLisle): Eve's soft-spoken adopted mother who acts as a buffer between her husband and daughter.
- Thokk / Battle Beast (voiced by Michael Dorn): A space-faring white lion-like alien warrior who seeks worthy opponents to fight.
- Damien Darkblood (voiced by Clancy Brown): A demon detective who escaped from Hell to seek justice for others and save his soul.
- Newscaster (voiced by Gary Anthony Williams)
- D.A. Sinclair (voiced by Ezra Miller in season 1, Eric Bauza in seasons 2–5): A mad scientist who creates Reanimen, human-cyborgs.
- Rick Sheridan (voiced by Jonathan Groff in season 1, Luke Macfarlane in season 2 onward): William's boyfriend.
- Angstrom Levy (voiced by Sterling K. Brown): A deformed supervillain who can create portals to other dimensions.
- Rus Livingston (voiced by Ben Schwartz): An astronaut who traveled to Mars and becomes possessed by Sequids.
- Paul (voiced by Cliff Curtis): Debbie's fellow real-estate agent and brief boyfriend.
- Oliver Grayson / Kid Omni-Man (voiced by Lincoln Bodin in season 2, Christian Convery in season 3 onward): The Viltrumite-Thraxan son of Omni-Man and Andressa, and Mark's younger half-brother.
- The Coalition of Planets: A collection of alien races that gathered together to fight the Viltrumites.
  - Allen the Alien (voiced by Seth Rogen): An assessor of member world candidates for the Coalition whose homeworld of Unopa was destroyed by the Viltrumites.
  - Thaedus (voiced by Peter Cullen): A rebel Viltrumite and the founder and leader of the Coalition.
  - Telia (voiced by Tatiana Maslany): Allen's girlfriend and a decorated general in the Coalition.
  - Captain Pikell (voiced by Scott Aukerman): A dim-witted captain in the Coalition navy who assists Nolan and Allen. He is a parody of Jean-Luc Picard.
  - Space Racer (voiced by Winston Duke): A nomadic alien biker with an extremely powerful gun known as the Infinity Ray.
  - Zoe Thompson / Tech Jacket (voiced by Zoey Deutch): A superhero with a suit of technologically advanced armor that gives the user flight and laser weaponry.
    - Tech Jacket A.I. (voiced by LeVar Burton): The A.I. of Tech Jacket's armor.
- Viltrum Empire: The ruling empire from the planet Viltrum that seeks to enslave other planets.
  - Thragg (voiced by Lee Pace): The Grand Regent of the Viltrum Empire and strongest Viltrumite.
  - Conquest (voiced by Jeffrey Dean Morgan): A long-lived sadistic Viltrumite warrior.
  - Kregg (voiced by Clancy Brown): A high-ranking Viltrumite general.
  - Anissa (voiced by Shantel VanSanten): A high-ranking Viltrumite warrior.
  - Lucan (voiced by Phil LaMarr): A Viltrumite warrior.
  - Thula (voiced by Grey DeLisle): A long-lived Viltrumite warrior with a hair knife.
  - Vidor (voiced by Chris Diamantopoulos): A Viltrumite warrior.
  - Kradd (voiced by Andrew Morgado): A Viltrumite warrior.
  - Executioner #1 (voiced by Eric Bauza): A Viltrumite executioner.
  - Executioner #2 (voiced by John DiMaggio): A Viltrumite executioner.
  - Nolan's father (voiced by Troy Baker): The unnamed father of Nolan.
  - Nolan's mother (voiced by Courtenay Taylor): The unnamed mother of Nolan.
  - General (voiced by Cleveland Berto): An unnamed instructor of new Viltrumite recruits earlier in the empire's history.
  - Argall (voiced by Frank Welker): The previous Emperor of the Viltrum Empire.
- The Order: An international criminal organization and secret society.
  - Mister Liu (voiced by Tzi Ma): A Chinese cyborg crime boss and the leader of the Order who can summon a dragon from his body.
    - Great Wall: A towering Chinese man with super-strength and enhanced durability who is Mister Liu's loyal bodyguard.
    - Magnattack (voiced by Eric Bauza): An assassin with ferrokinesis who works for Liu and has magnetic powers. Magnattack was killed by Titan.
  - Machine Head (voiced by Jeffrey Donovan): A cyborg crime lord with an auto-tuned voice, extensive illicit funding, and Titan's former boss.
  - Titan (voiced by Mahershala Ali in season 1, Todd Williams in season 3 onward): A criminal enforcer-turned-crime boss who can manifest regenerative stone armor at will. He later became a member of the Order and led its Chicago branch.
    - Isotope (voiced by Chris Diamantopoulos): A teleporting villain. He was Machine Head's top lieutenant and later became part of Titan's Order branch as Titan's right-hand man.
    - Tether Tyrant (voiced by Reginald VelJohnson in season 1): A supervillain with elastic tentacles who was hired by Machine Head to be his bodyguard. He later became part of Titan's Chicago branch of the Order.
    - Magmanic: A barefoot supervillain who can generate, control, and become lava. He is Tether Tyrant's boyfriend who worked as a bodyguard for Machine Head and wears a special suit that is immune to his lava form. Magmanic later became part of Titan's Chicago branch of the Order.
    - Furnace: A plasma-themed supervillain in a brown robotic suit that worked as a bodyguard for Machine Head. He later became part of Titan's Chicago branch of the Order.
  - Paul Cha / Multi-Paul (voiced by Simu Liu): Dupli-Kate's twin brother with the same powers.
  - Connie / War Woman (voiced by Mae Whitman): War Woman's co-worker and business partner in the heroine's civilian identity who later takes up her mantle and joins the Order to avenge her predecessor and take revenge on "man's world".
  - The Walking Dread (voiced by Phil LaMarr): A large villain with the ability to absorb energy who controls eastern Europe's crime syndicates from Poland.
  - Face: A Canadian crime boss who wears a brown mask with three lenses.
  - Red Eye: A Brazilian crime boss who has glowing red eyes.
  - Embrace: An Israeli crime boss.
  - Slaying Mantis: An Irish crime boss who sports mantis-themed armor.
  - Insomniac: An Egyptian crime boss whose helmet contains a part to keep his eyes open.

=== Guest ===
- Steve (voiced by Jon Hamm): A Secret Service agent who guards the White House's front gate.
- Matt (voiced by Max Burkholder): Steve's stepson.
- Guardians of the Globe (original roster): A decades-old superhero team who are massacred by Omni-Man. Immortal and Black Samson were originally members of this team.
  - Holly / War Woman (voiced by Lauren Cohan): A powerful ancient warrior and co-benefactor of the Guardians.
  - Alana / Green Ghost (voiced by Sonequa Martin-Green): A superheroine encased in a green suit with ghost-like powers.
  - Martian Man (voiced by Chad L. Coleman): An exiled, shapeshifting Martian superhero.
  - Josef / Red Rush (voiced by Michael Cudlitz): A Russian speedster and the team's first responder.
  - Darkwing (voiced by Lennie James): A gadget-wielding caped crusader and co-benefactor of the Guardians.
  - Aquarus (voiced by Ross Marquand): A hydrokinetic, piscine humanoid and king of an underwater Atlantean kingdom.
- B.N. Winslow (voiced by Reginald VelJohnson): The principal of Reginald VelJohnson High School who later becomes the dean of Upstate University. The Winslow name is a callback to VelJohnson's role on Family Matters.
- Doc Seismic (voiced by Chris Diamantopoulos): A mad scientist who holds socially progressive views towards the U.S. government and its past leaders and wields earthquake-generating wristbands.
- Bi-Plane (voiced by Ross Marquand): A flight suit-empowered supervillain.
- The Elephant (voiced by John DiMaggio): A namesake-themed villain who opposes the consumption of meat.
- Kursk (voiced by Ross Marquand): A Russian electrokinetic supervillain and enemy of Red Rush who worked as a bodyguard of Machine Head. He later joins Titans' Chicago branch of the Order.
- Slash (voiced by Djimon Hounsou): The Flaxan leader of the first three invasion forces who aims to kill Invincible for scarring him and conquer Earth.
- Olga (voiced by Grey DeLisle): Red Rush's widow and friend of Debbie Grayson.
- Martian Emperor (voiced by Djimon Hounsou): The unnamed ruler of Mars.
- Vanessa (voiced by Nicole Byer): Titan's wife.
- Fiona (voiced by Nicole Byer in season 1, Somali Rose in season 3 onward): Titan's daughter.
- Doug Cheston (voiced by Justin Roiland): A student at Upstate University.
- Lizard League: A gang of lizard-themed supervillains.
  - Queen Lizard (voiced by Tatiana Maslany): The Lizard League's original leader.
  - King Lizard (voiced by Scoot McNairy as an adult, Jacob Tremblay as a child): The son of Queen Lizard who was formerly known as Prince Lizard and succeeded his mother as leader of the Lizard League.
  - Salamander (voiced by Phil LaMarr): A namesake-themed member.
  - Iguana (voiced by Malese Jow): A namesake-themed member.
  - Komodo Dragon (voiced by Jay Pharoah): A namesake-themed member.
  - Supreme Lizard (voiced by Fred Tatasciore): A Lizard League member.
- Kyle (voiced by Khary Payton): A nerdy frat boy who befriends Amber at Upstate University.
- Dr. Elias Brandyworth (voiced by Stephen Root): A government scientist who created Atom Eve 18 years prior.
- Polly (voiced by Grey DeLisle): Eve's biological mother.
- Steven Erickson (voiced by Lance Reddick): A government agent.
- Dr. Rodgers (voiced by Chris Diamantopoulos): A government scientist and Steven Erickson's right-hand man.
- Louise (voiced by Zehra Fazal): A civilian who lived in an apartment in Chicago with her daughter before it was destroyed.
- Louise's daughter (voiced by Micah Aliling): A girl who lived in an apartment in Chicago with her mother Louise before it was destroyed.
- The Giant (voiced by Fred Tatasciore): An orange-skinned giant cyclops with the mind of a child.
- Queen Aquaria (voiced by Tatiana Maslany): The sole monarch of the Atlanteans and their undersea kingdom.
- Catlin Stedman (voiced by Kari Wahlgren): A female alternate universe variant of Cecil.
- Denise Ferguson (voiced by Kari Wahlgren): A female alternate universe variant of Donald.
- Theo (voiced by Daveed Diggs): The widower of Green Ghost and member of a support group for superhero spouses.
- Carol (voiced by Lea Thompson): The therapist of a superhero spouse support group.
- Thraxans: A race of insectoid aliens with accelerated aging.
  - Nuolzot (voiced by Rob Delaney): A shapeshifting insectoid alien and one of Nolan's subjects.
  - Andressa (voiced by Rhea Seehorn): Nolan's second wife and the mother of Mark's half-brother Oliver.
- Narrator (voiced by Paul F. Tompkins): The narrator for Mark's college trip and Allen's side mission.
- Filip Schaff (voiced by Tim Robinson): The creator of Seance Dog. He is visually inspired by comic artist Ryan Ottley, who worked on the Invincible comics.
- Agent Spider (voiced by Josh Keaton): A web-shooting spider-themed superhero from an alternate universe. The character replaces Marvel Comics' Spider-Man, whom Invincible met briefly in the comic series.
- Prof. Ock (grunts provided by an uncredited Chris Diamantopoulos): A supervillain from another reality who wears an octopus-themed helmet with tentacles. The character replaces Doctor Octopus, whom Invincible briefly helps Spider-Man defeat.
- Angstrom Jr. (voiced by Camden Coley): The son of one of Angstrom's variants.
- Jane (voiced by Ella Purnell): An archaeologist who uncovers the ancient Tomb of Ka-Hor in search of her father.
- Riley / Maxima'am (voiced by Chloe Bennet): Jane's friend and fellow archaeologist who possesses super-strength.
- Ka-Hor (voiced by Clancy Brown): An undead ancient Egyptian mummy trapped within his tomb.
- Fightmaster and Dropkick (both voiced by Xolo Maridueña): A duo of time-traveling thieves.
- Knuckle Buster (voiced by Kari Wahlgren): A member of a radical terrorist organization that Cecil encountered in the past.
- Force Fist (voiced by Chris Diamantopoulos): A member of a radical terrorist organization that Cecil encountered in the past.
- Radcliffe (voiced by Bokeem Woodbine): Cecil's predecessor as director of the GDA.
- Scott Duvall / Powerplex (voiced by Aaron Paul): An electricity-powered villain.
- Becky Duvall (voiced by Kate Mara): Scott's wife.
- Bruce / Bolt (voiced by Cleveland Berto): An electrokinetic hero with super strength.
- The Technicians (voiced by Doug Bradley): A trio of inter-dimensional, high-tech scientists who partnered with Angstrom Levy.
- Satan (voiced by Bruce Campbell): An ancient demon and the supreme ruler of Hell.
- David Anders / Dinosaurus (voiced by Matthew Rhys): An intelligent transforming dinosauroid.
- Universa (voiced by Danai Gurira): An alien warrior with a powerful electric staff.
- Volcanikka (voiced by Indira Varma): A powerful lava elemental who can control the Magmanites.
- Domina (voiced by Kate Mulgrew): Damien Darkblood's sister.
- Edward Thompson (voiced by Bobby Moynihan): Tech Jacket's father.
- Chris / Gravitator (voiced by Jack Quaid): A small time villain with gravity gauntlets.

== Episodes ==
Season	Episodes		Originally released	
Season	Episodes		First released	Last released
1	8		March 25, 2021	April 29, 2021
2	8	S	July 21, 2023	
2	8	4	November 3, 2023	November 24, 2023
2	8	4	March 14, 2024	April 4, 2024
3	8		February 6, 2025	March 13, 2025
4	8		March 18, 2026	April 22, 2026

=== Season 1 (2021) ===
No. overall	No. in season	Title	Directed by	Written by	Original release date
1	1	"It's About Time"	Robert Valley	Robert Kirkman	March 25, 2021
2	2	"Here Goes Nothing"	Paul Furminger	Simon Racioppa	March 25, 2021
3	3	"Who You Calling Ugly?"	Jeff Allen	Chris Black	March 25, 2021
4	4	"Neil Armstrong, Eat Your Heart Out"	Cory Evans	Ryan Ridley	April 1, 2021
5	5	"That Actually Hurt"	Jay Baker	Christine Lavaf	April 8, 2021
6	6	"You Look Kinda Dead"	Paul Furminger	Curtis Gwinn	April 15, 2021
7	7	"We Need to Talk"	Vinton Heuck	Simon Racioppa	April 22, 2021
8	8	"Where I Really Come From"	William Ruzicka	Robert Kirkman	April 29, 2021

=== Season 2 (2023–24) ===
No. overall	No. in season	Title	Directed by	Written by	Original release date
Special
9	–	"Invincible: Atom Eve"	Haylee Herrick	Helen Leigh and Robert Kirkman	July 21, 2023
Part 1
10	1	"A Lesson for Your Next Life"	Sol Choi	Simon Racioppa	November 3, 2023
11	2	"In About Six Hours, I Lose My Virginity to a Fish"	Ian Abando	Matt Lambert	November 10, 2023
12	3	"This Missive, This Machination!"	Tanner Johnson	Adria Lang	November 17, 2023
13	4	"It's Been a While"	Jason Zurek	Helen Leigh	November 24, 2023
Part 2
14	5	"This Must Come as a Shock"	Haylee Herrick	Helen Leigh	March 14, 2024
15	6	"It's Not That Simple"	Sol Choi	Vivian Lee	March 21, 2024
16	7	"I'm Not Going Anywhere"	Ian Abando	Simon Racioppa	March 28, 2024
17	8	"I Thought You Were Stronger"	Tanner Johnson	Robert Kirkman	April 4, 2024

=== Season 3 (2025) ===
No. overall	No. in season	Title	Directed by	Written by	Original release date
18	1	"You're Not Laughing Now"	Jason Zurek	Simon Racioppa	February 6, 2025
19	2	"A Deal with the Devil"	Haylee Herrick	Helen Leigh	February 6, 2025
20	3	"You Want a Real Costume, Right?"	Sol Choi	Jay Faerber	February 6, 2025
21	4	"You Were My Hero"	Ian Abando	Tania Lotia	February 13, 2025
22	5	"This Was Supposed to Be Easy"	Tanner Johnson	Helen Shang	February 20, 2025
23	6	"All I Can Say Is I'm Sorry"	Jason Zurek	Ross Stracke and Simon Racioppa	February 27, 2025
24	7	"What Have I Done?"	Haylee Herrick	Robert Kirkman	March 6, 2025
25	8	"I Thought You'd Never Shut Up"	Sol Choi	Robert Kirkman	March 13, 2025

=== Season 4 (2026) ===
No. overall	No. in season	Title	Directed by	Written by	Original release date
26	1	"Making the World a Better Place"	Sol Choi	Helen Leigh	March 18, 2026
27	2	"I'll Give You the Grand Tour"	Jason Zurek	Simon Racioppa	March 18, 2026
28	3	"I Gotta Get Some Air"	Stephanie Gonzaga	Ross Stracke	March 18, 2026
29	4	"Hurm"	Ian Abando	Robert Kirkman	March 25, 2026
30	5	"Give Us a Moment"	Sol Choi	Adria Lang	April 1, 2026
31	6	"You Look Horrible"	Jason Zurek	Amber Dupre	April 8, 2026
32	7	"Don't Do Anything Rash"	Stephanie Gonzaga	Helen Leigh	April 15, 2026
33	8	"Don't Leave Me Hanging Here"	Ian Abando	Simon Racioppa	April 22, 2026

== Production ==
=== Development ===
A live-action film based on the Image Comics comic book series Invincible was revealed in April 2017 to be in development at Universal Pictures, with Seth Rogen and Evan Goldberg, who were fans of the comics, hired as the writers and directors. The duo were set to produce the film alongside James Weaver through their company Point Grey Pictures, while Invincible co-creator Robert Kirkman also joined to produce alongside David Alpert, Bryan Furst, and Sean Furst through his company Skybound Entertainment, which had a first-look deal with Universal for the film. However, when the series was announced, the film remained in hiatus, until on January 26, 2021, when it was revealed that the film was still in development and would exist separately from the series. In a 2023 interview, Rogen stated that the animated series has had a strong influence on the live-action film adaptation in development at Universal, which is essentially being developed as a live-action version of the animated series.

On August 11, 2017, Kirkman, with his company Skybound Entertainment, signed a deal with Amazon to develop various series for Amazon Prime Video. However, it was revealed that series that were already in production or development with other studios, would not be developed for Amazon. Kirkman revealed that he was interested on developing a series of the Invincible comic series, but that would not be possible at the moment because Universal was developing a film based on the comic series.

However, on June 19, 2018, it was announced that Amazon had given a series order to the project for a first season consisting of eight episodes. It was also revealed that the series would be animated and its episodes would be hour-long. Kirkman chose traditional hand-drawn animation, realizing from the CGI adaptation of Super Dinosaur that 3D modeling's lengthy and costly process would limit the number of new characters per episode. Robert Kirkman and Simon Racioppa serve as co-showrunners, with both also serving as executive producers alongside David Alpert, Margaret M. Dean, Catherine Winder, Seth Rogen, and Evan Goldberg. Helen Leigh and Cory Walker serve as co-executive producers. Production companies involved with the series include Skybound Entertainment.

On April 29, 2021, after the release of the final episode of the first season, Amazon renewed the series for a second and third season. In April 2023, Kirkman stated that the second season would focus on Angstrom Levy, a supervillain with access to multiple dimensions. In April 2024, Amazon was reported to have renewed the series for a fourth and fifth season, although IGN subsequently reported this was not accurate. In May 2024, The Immortal voice actor Ross Marquand said that season 3 "is nearly finished" and would be released in early 2025. In July 2024, Amazon renewed the series for a fourth season. In July 2025, Amazon renewed the series for a fifth season. In June 2026, Amazon renewed the series for a sixth season.

=== Casting ===
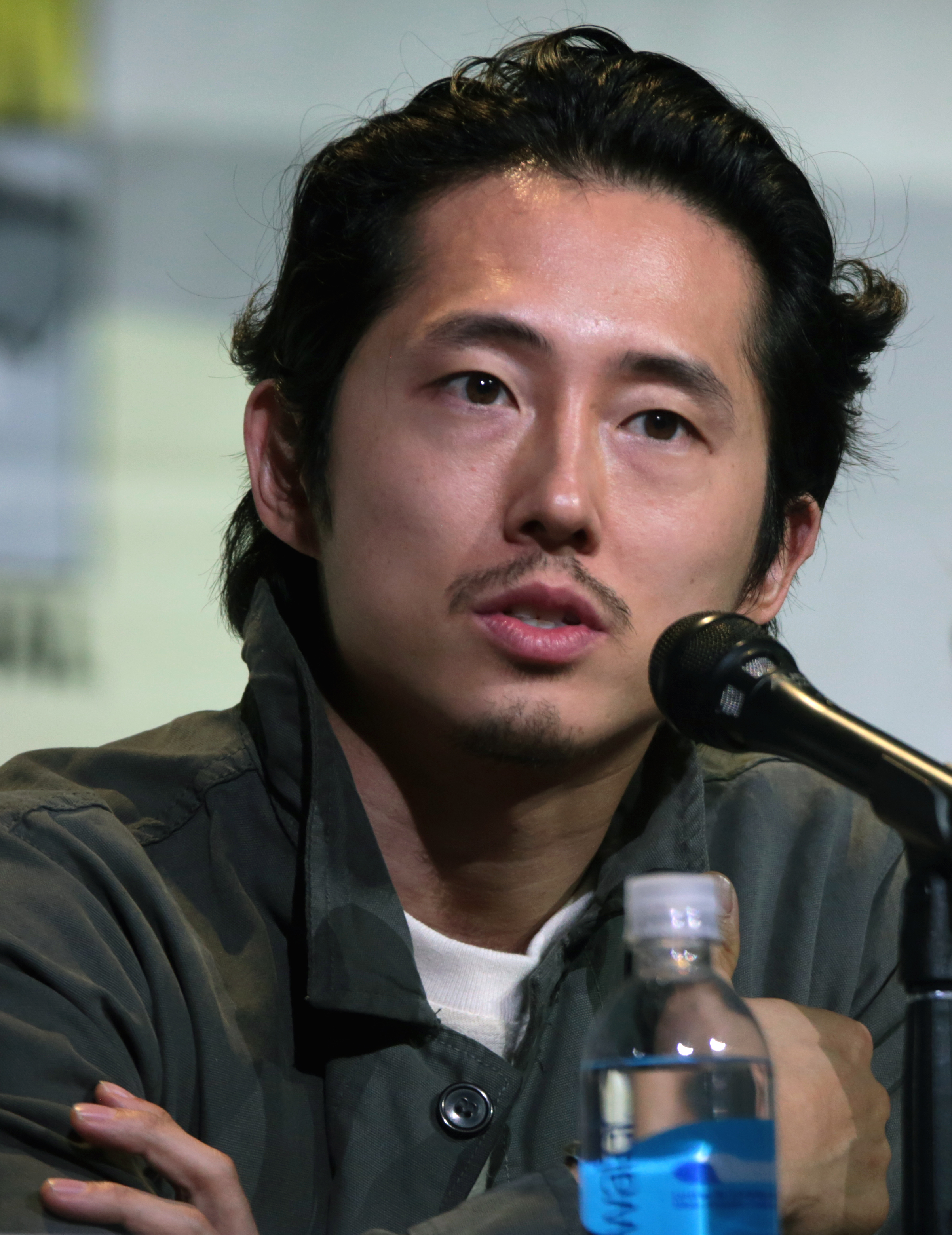
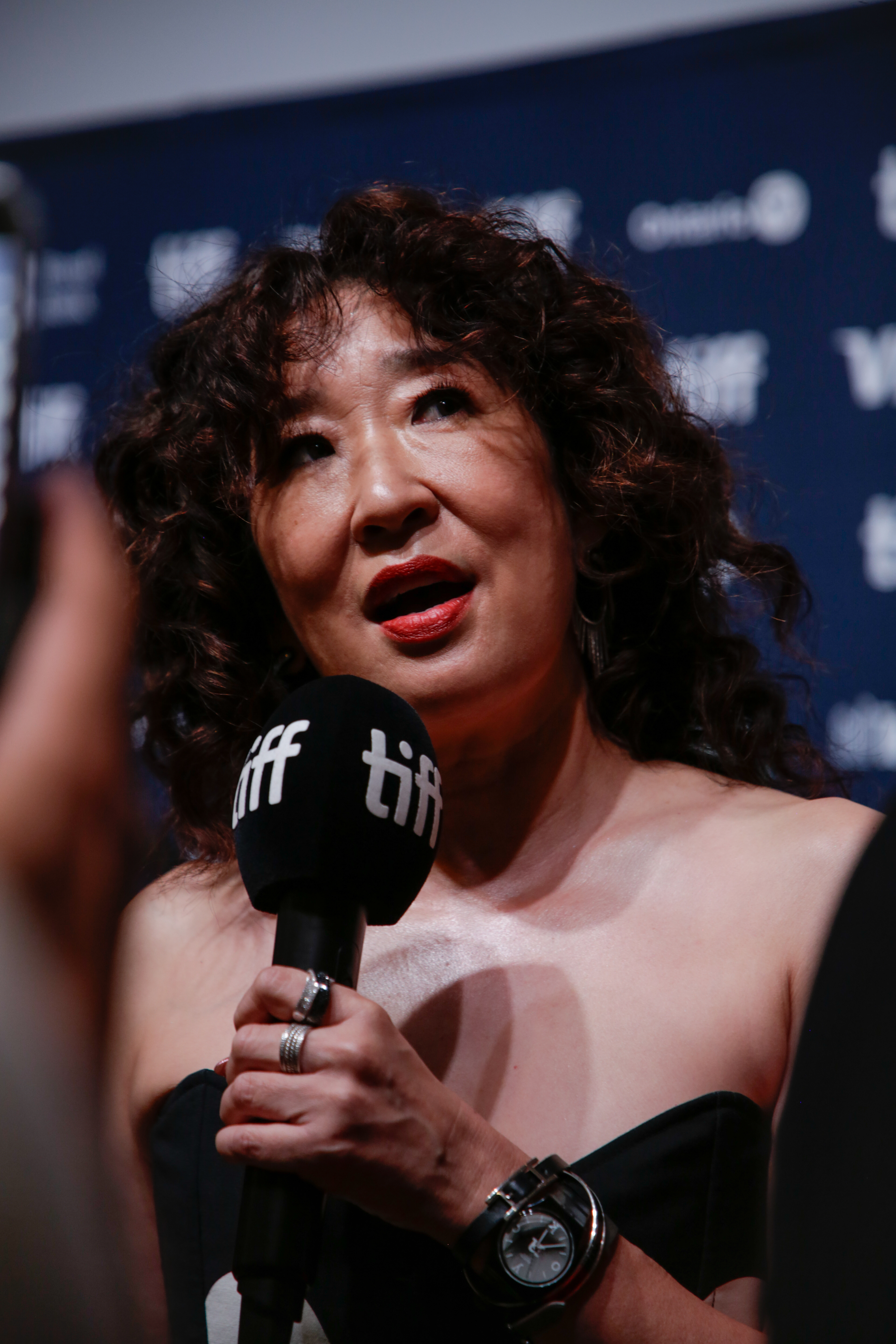
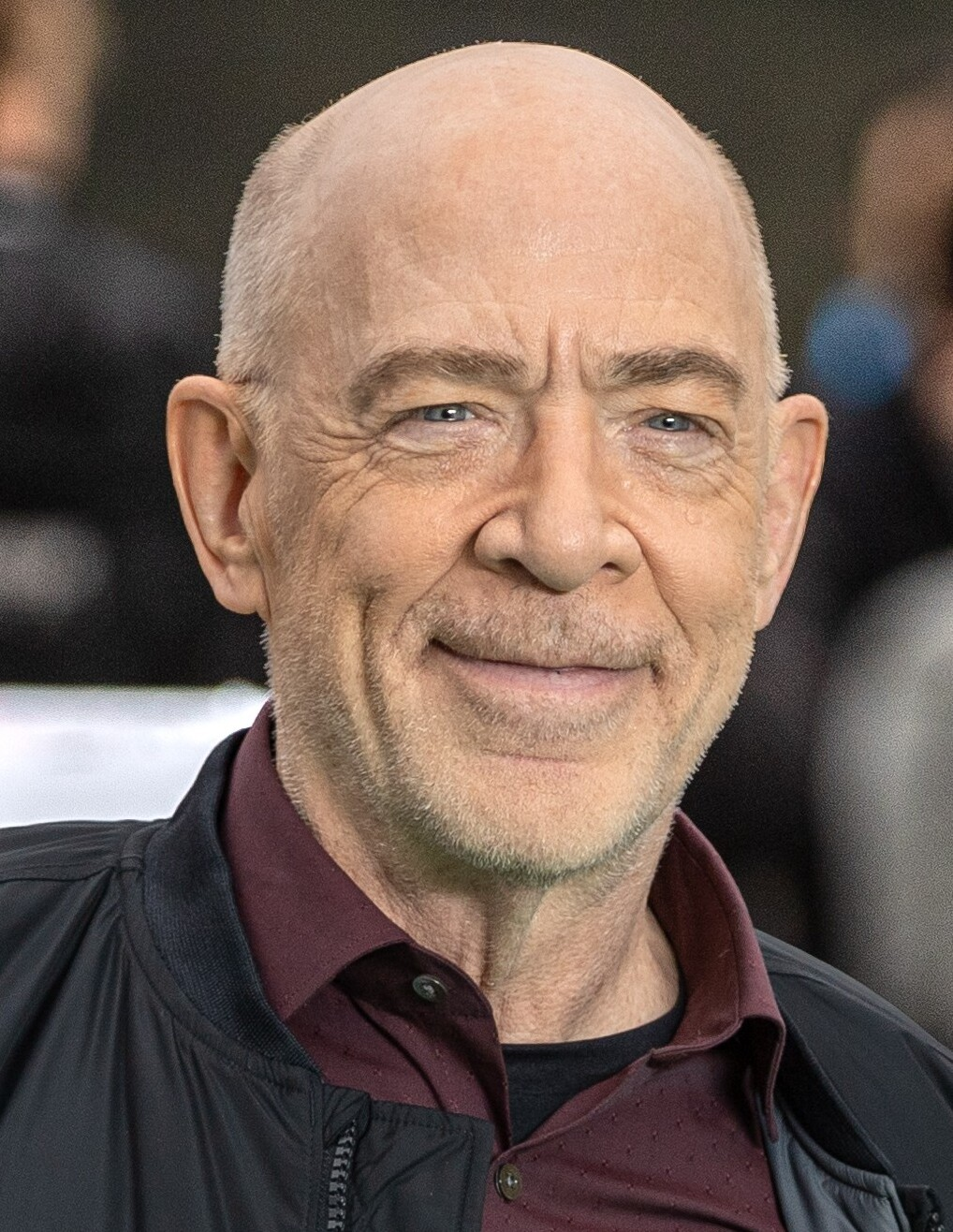
Lead actors Steven Yeun, Sandra Oh, and JK Simmons

On January 31, 2019, the cast of the series was revealed, with Steven Yeun to portray Mark Grayson / Invincible, J. K. Simmons portraying Nolan Grayson / Omni-Man; Sandra Oh, Mark Hamill, Seth Rogen, Gillian Jacobs, Andrew Rannells, Zazie Beetz, Walton Goggins, Jason Mantzoukas, Mae Whitman, Chris Diamantopoulos, Malese Jow, Kevin Michael Richardson, Grey Griffin and Max Burkholder also joining the cast of the series. On July 18, 2020, Kirkman confirmed the casting in a live video on Twitter.

Due to Yeun and Oh both being of Korean descent, Oh's character Debbie Grayson was made to be Korean American in the animated adaptation, with her son Mark Grayson being half-Korean. Their Korean identity is not directly mentioned in the show, but a painting featuring Hangul text that reads 안녕 (annyeong; 'hello') is shown in the Grayson home. The decision came from a desire to increase diverse representations in the series. Similarly, Amber Bennett, Mark's ex-girlfriend, was made an African American teenager in the adaptation. Originally closeted before coming out midway through the series comic run, the character of William Clockwell, Mark's best friend, is instead made openly gay from the start of the series.

In January 2025, it was announced that Aaron Paul, Simu Liu, Jonathan Banks, Kate Mara, Xolo Maridueña, John DiMaggio, Tzi Ma, Doug Bradley, and Christian Convery would join the voice cast for the third season.

In July 2025, it was announced that Matthew Rhys had been cast as Dinosaurus. In October that same year, it was announced that Lee Pace had been cast as Thragg. In January 2026, it was announced that Danai Gurira had been cast as Universa.

In June 2026, Jack Quaid was cast as Chris / Gravitator for the fifth season.

=== Animation and title sequence ===
When the show was confirmed to be animated, it was confirmed that Wind Sun Sky Entertainment and its partner company, Skybound North, would be animating and co-producing the series.

Kirkman praised the work of the show's animation studio, Maven Image Platform. Kirkman noted in particular the Guardians' deaths at the end of episode 1, and the fight between Mark and Omni-Man in episode 8. Two additional animation studios were brought on for season 2 according to an interview with Margaret Dean.

The series title sequence is recognized by appearing right where a character would have said "Invincible", typically the first instance in each episode. Throughout the first season, the title sequence becomes progressively bloodier with each episode. Kirkman revealed that he wanted to represent the dark days that lay ahead by using the increasingly bloody title cards. Racioppa revealed that he wanted each episode to be different from the previous ones to convince the audience not to skip it. The animation style borrows from the look of Saturday morning cartoons from the early 2000s, and has also been noted for its anime-like visuals and aesthetics.

The second season's title cards feature a similar progression, cracking and shattering to uncover a black-and-blue design underneath, a reference to Invincible's secondary costume worn between issues #51 to #70.

The third season's title cards feature a glitch effect followed by a new color palette from the previous episode, each representing an alternate multiverse version of Invincible and their respective costume.

The fourth season's title cards feature a white and gray background ripping apart to unveil the vacuum of space, before a blinding flash of light changes it to a blue and white background.

=== Music ===
John Paesano composes the score to the series.

== Release ==
After Amazon ordered the first season of the series, it was confirmed that it would consist of eight episodes. On January 22, 2021, during a livestream celebrating the 18th anniversary of the first issue of Invincible, Kirkman revealed that the series would debut on March 25, 2021 (midnight EST), with the first 3 episodes. The remaining episodes were released weekly thereafter. During San Diego Comic-Con on July 21, 2023, it was announced that part one of the second season would premiere on November 3, 2023, and was also announced that a special episode, called "Invincible: Atom Eve", would release later that day. Part two of the second season debuted on March 14, 2024. The third season premiered on February 6, 2025, with its first three episodes, with the remaining five episodes released weekly. The fourth season premiered on March 18, 2026, with its first three episodes, while remaining episodes were released on a weekly basis up until the season finale on April 22. The fifth season is expected to premiere on February 17, 2027.

== Reception ==
=== Critical response ===
Critical response of Invincible
Season	Rotten Tomatoes	Metacritic
1	98% (86 reviews)	73 (16 reviews)
2	100% (42 reviews)	82 (13 reviews)
3	100% (27 reviews)	76 (7 reviews)
4	100% (24 reviews)	77 (6 reviews)

Invincible has received critical acclaim, with praise for its animation, performances, and writing. (Note: Multiple references, including:) On the review aggregator website Rotten Tomatoes, the first season of Invincible has a 98% approval rating, based on 88 critic reviews, with an average rating of 8.6/10. The site's consensus reads: "With bold animation, bloody action, and an all-star cast led by the charming Steven Yeun, Invincible smartly adapts its source material without sacrificing its nuanced perspective on the price of superpowers." Metacritic reported a score of 73 out of 100 based on 16 critics, indicating "generally favorable reviews" for the first season. The second season has an approval rating of 100% based on 41 reviews, with an average rating of 8.4/10. The site's consensus reads: "Still as bracing as a punch to the face and invigorating with its vivid worldbuilding, Invincible is practically impervious to disappointing audiences in this sterling sophomore season." On Metacritic, the season has a weighted average score of 82 out of 100, based on 13 critics, indicating "universal acclaim". The third season has an approval rating of 100% based on 21 reviews, with an average rating of 8.3/10. The site's consensus reads: "Muddying the waters of justice and adding droplets of blood for good measure, Invincible and its titular hero reach their prime with this epic third season." On Metacritic, the season has a weighted average score of 74 out of 100, based on 6 critics, indicating "generally favorable" reviews.

=== Accolades ===
Award	Date of ceremony	Category	Recipient	Result	Ref.
Hollywood Critics Association TV Awards	August 22, 2021	Best Animated Series or Animated Television Movie	Invincible	Nominated	
Dorian TV Awards	August 29, 2021	Best Animated Show	Invincible	Nominated	
Annie Awards	March 12, 2022	Outstanding Achievement for Storyboarding in an Animated Television / Broadcast Production	Jay Baker (for "Where I Really Come From")	Nominated	
Annie Awards	February 17, 2024	Best Animated Special Production	"Invincible: Atom Eve"	Nominated	
Annie Awards	February 21, 2026	Outstanding Achievement for Editorial in an Animated Television/Broadcast Production	Luke Asa Guidici, Matt Michael, Lea Carosella, and Liam Johnson (for "I Thought You'd Never Shut Up")	Nominated	
Saturn Awards	October 25, 2022	Best Animated Television Series	Invincible	Nominated	
Saturn Awards	March 8, 2026	Best Superhero Television Series	Invincible	Nominated	
Primetime Emmy Awards	September 7–8, 2024	Outstanding Character Voice-Over Performance	Sterling K. Brown as Angstrom Levy (for "I Thought You Were Stronger")	Nominated	
Primetime Emmy Awards	September 6–7, 2025	Outstanding Character Voice-Over Performance	Steven Yeun as Invincible/Mark Grayson (for "What Have I Done?")	Nominated	
Primetime Emmy Awards	September 5–6, 2026	Outstanding Character Voice-Over Performance	Steven Yeun as Invincible/Mark Grayson (for Don't Leave Me Hanging Here")	Nominated	
Critics' Choice Television Awards	January 12, 2025	Best Animated Series	Invincible	Nominated	
Golden Reel Awards	February 23, 2025	Outstanding Achievement in Sound Editing – Non-Theatrical Animation	Brad Meyer, Katie Jackson, Mia Perfetti, Natalia Saavedra Brychcy, Logan Romjue, Carol Ma (for "I Thought You Were Stronger")	Nominated	
Golden Reel Awards	March 8, 2026	Outstanding Achievement in Sound Editing – Non-Theatrical Animation	Brad Meyer, Natalia Saavedra Brychcy, Katie Jackson, Noah Kowalski, Jayson Niner, Mia Perfetti, Logan Romjue, Carol Ma (for "I Thought You'd Never Shut Up")	Nominated	
Harvey Awards	October 18, 2024	Best Adaptation from Comic Book/Graphic Novel	Invincible	Nominated	
Harvey Awards	October 9, 2026	Best Adaptation from Comic Book/Graphic Novel	Invincible	Pending	

=== In other media ===
The eighth episode of the series' first season spawned a popular Internet meme known as "Think, Mark". A 2022 promotional episode of the web series Death Battle! pit Invincible's Omni-Man against The Boys' Homelander, with Amazon Studios' Head of Marketing Adam Bersin having partnered with Rooster Teeth to promote its series, previously including the second season of The Boys, also produced by Amazon. Consequently, both Omni-Man and Homelander were made available as playable characters in the 2023 video game Mortal Kombat 1, with J. K. Simmons reprising his role as the former. In November 2023, a role-playing video game titled Invincible Presents: Atom Eve was released; the game is loosely based on the animated series' continuity with some alterations and a new original story. In February 2024, a mobile game RPG titled Invincible: Guarding the Globe was released. In April 2024, Skybound was revealed to be internally developing an AAA video game based on Invincible. Over 30 employees were reported to be working on the game, which included industry veterans who had worked for Electronic Arts, Activision Blizzard, and AMZ Games, while a fundraiser campaign was also being established. A fighting game based on the series, titled Invincible VS, was released on April 30, 2026.

=== Lawsuit ===
Creator Robert Kirkman was sued by comic book colorist William Crabtree, citing a rights and profits concern, on January 10, 2022. The case was settled out of court on January 25, 2024.
