= I Thought You Were Stronger =

- Invincible episode
- Episode no.: Season 2 Episode 8
- Directed by: Tanner Johnson
- Written by: Robert Kirkman
- Based on: Volume 7: Threes Company (Issue #33-34)
- Original release date: April 4, 2024
- Running time: 54 minutes

Additional cast
- Sterling K. Brown as Angstrom Levy; Josh Keaton as Agent Spider; Chloe Bennet as Riley; Ella Purnell as Jane; Clancy Brown as General Kregg and Ka-Hor

Episode chronology
← Previous "I'm Not Going Anywhere"	Next → "You're Not Laughing Now"
- Invincible season 2

"I Thought You Were Stronger" is the eighth and final episode of the second season of the American adult animated superhero series Invincible, based on the comic book series of the same name created by Robert Kirkman, Cory Walker and Ryan Ottley, which was produced by Skybound Entertainment. The episode was written by Kirkman and directed by Tanner Johnson. It premiered on Amazon Prime Video on April 4, 2024.

The finale focuses on the series’ antagonist, Angstrom Levy, a villain with the ability to create portals to other dimensions, as he seeks revenge against Invincible after a failed mission that left him disfigured, as shown in the series. The finale also follows Mark as he tries to rebuild his life after being betrayed by his father, Omni-Man.

Upon returning home, he finds that his mother and half-brother are being held captive by Levy and that he is forced to fight him in order to save them.

The season finale received generally positive reviews, with critics praising the voice acting performances.

== Plot ==
Within a Viltrumite prison ship, Nolan Grayson survives a pre-execution inspection overseen by General Kregg. Meanwhile, his son Mark Grayson returns home to find a supervillain named Angstrom Levy holding his mother Debbie and brother Oliver hostage. Mark initially fails to recognize Angstrom until the latter reminds him of their past encounter which left him both physically and mentally broken. Accusing Mark of ruining his ambitions, Angstrom uses his multiversal powers to strand him in an alternate dimension. Though Mark finds his way back to his Earth, Angstrom repeatedly sends him across the multiverse amidst episodes of PTSD brought on by memories of evil versions of Mark his variants faced.

Eventually, Mark tries to surrender in exchange for his family's lives, but Angstrom refuses and states his intention to murder not just Mark, but everyone he loves. Debbie attacks Angstrom; he breaks her arm and threatens to crush Oliver's head. Upon seeing this, an enraged Mark battles Angstrom across numerous dimensions until they reach a desolate Earth; Mark beats Angstrom until he's completely covered in the latter's blood. Haunted by guilt and fearing that he is becoming akin to his father, a stranded Mark questions his actions before he is rescued by a future incarnation of the Guardians of the Globe. Amidst this, their version of Atom Eve urges Mark to confess his feelings for his version of her. Afterward, Mark visits a hospitalized Debbie, quits college to focus on self-discipline, and reconnects with Eve.

== Production ==
=== Guest stars ===
Sterling K. Brown voices Angstrom Levy, the episode’s primary antagonist, who previously appeared in the season’s first two episodes. Levy is depicted as a human capable of creating portals that allow him to travel between alternate dimensions. Josh Keaton voices Agent Spider, a character encountered by Mark during a multiverse sequence. The character is an adaptation of Spider-Man from the crossover tie-in in Marvel Team-Up #14, with Keaton having previously voiced Spider-Man in several Marvel productions. Clancy Brown voices General Kregg, a Viltrumite leader overseeing Omni-Man’s imprisonment and planned execution, and Ella Purnell voices Jane, alongside Chloe Bennet as explorers involved in Ka-Hor's temple on Earth.

== Reception ==
The episode, received positive reviews from critics, who highlighted its action sequences and focus on the conflict between Mark Grayson and Angstrom Levy. Reviewers also noted the episode’s emphasis on Mark’s moral struggle and the consequences of his actions during the confrontation.

=== Critical response ===
Mark fighting Angstrom Levy with a Fortnite gun

James Dowling of Multiverse of Color highlighted the episode’s climactic confrontation between Mark Grayson and Angstrom Levy, particularly the multiverse sequence that concludes the season. Dowling noted the episode’s narrative developments and action set pieces while commenting on the implications of the ending for future seasons.

Mitchell Chapman of InReview gave the episode a score of 9 out of 10, describing it as an effective conclusion to the season. Chapman wrote that Invincible challenges expectations associated with traditional superhero narratives while examining the psychological and emotional consequences of violence. Writing for The Badger Online, Jemimah Kayode discussed the impact of the episode on Mark Grayson and his family, noting its emphasis on the emotional consequences of the conflict. Kayode wrote that the episode departs from common superhero conventions by portraying credible threats to the protagonist’s loved ones and highlighting Mark’s moral dilemmas.

In its review, IGN highlighted the episode’s focus on the confrontation between Invincible and Angstrom Levy, as well as the development of their respective storylines. The review also commented on the episode’s exploration of the psychological and emotional consequences of violence. It described "I Thought You Were Stronger" as a concluding chapter that resolves several narrative threads from the second season of Invincible.

Siddhant Adlakha, writing for IGN, commented on the emotional content of the season two finale, specifically on the confrontation between Mark Grayson and Angstrom Levy. He praised the work of Steven Yeun and Sterling K. Brown during this part of the episode, where he stated that the episode puts Mark in a place of moral and emotional ambiguity after this confrontation. He also stated that despite some issues in the narrative and Levy’s lack of appearance throughout the season, there are hints of future storylines.

=== Accolades ===
Sterling K. Brown received a nomination for Outstanding Character Voice-Over Performance at the 76th Primetime Creative Arts Emmy Awards for his portrayal of Angstrom Levy in the episode "I Thought You Were Stronger".

== Release ==
"I Thought You Were Stronger" premiered on Prime Video in the United States on April 4, 2024. It was released at the same time around the world, in more than 40 countries and territories.
