= Primetime Emmy Award for Outstanding Character Voice-Over Performance =

- Awarded for: Outstanding Character Voice-Over Performance in a Series or a Special
- Country: United States
- Presented by: Academy of Television Arts and Sciences
- First award: 2014
- Currently held by: Julie Andrews, Bridgerton (2026)
- Website: emmys.com

This is a list of winners and nominees of the Primetime Emmy Award for Outstanding Character Voice-Over Performance.

In 2014, the award for Outstanding Voice-Over Performance was separated into two categories – Outstanding Narrator and Outstanding Character Voice-Over Performance. As with longform and reality, this split acknowledges and accommodates a general industry uptrend in the distinctly different achievements that are VO narration and VO character performance.

== Winners and nominations ==
=== 2010s ===
Year	Actor	Program	Role	Episode	Network
2014 (66th)
2014 (66th)	Harry Shearer	The Simpsons	Kent Brockman, Mr. Burns, Younger Burns and Smithers	"Four Regrettings and a Funeral"	Fox
2014 (66th)	Chris Diamantopoulos	Mickey Mouse	Mickey Mouse	"The Adorable Couple"	Disney
2014 (66th)	Stephen Full	Dog with a Blog	Stan	"My Parents Posted What?!"	Disney
2014 (66th)	Seth Green	Robot Chicken	Various Characters	"Robot Chicken DC Comics Special 2: Villains in Paradise"	Cartoon Network
2014 (66th)	Maurice LaMarche	Futurama	Calculon and Morbo	"Calculon 2.0"	Comedy Central
2014 (66th)	Seth MacFarlane	Family Guy	Peter Griffin, Stewie Griffin, Glenn Quagmire	"Into Harmony's Way"	Fox
2015 (67th)
2015 (67th)	Hank Azaria	The Simpsons	Moe Szyslak, Pedicab Driver	"The Princess Guide"	Fox
2015 (67th)	Seth Green	Robot Chicken	Batman, The Count, Bryan Mills, Liam Neeson, Pirates, Quarterback, The Nerd	"Victoria's Secret of Nimph"	Cartoon Network
2015 (67th)	Seth MacFarlane	Family Guy	Brian Griffin, Dr. Hartman, Peter Griffin, Stewie Griffin	"Our Idiot Brian"	Fox
2015 (67th)	Tress MacNeille	The Simpsons	Laney Fontaine, Shauna, Mrs. Muntz	"My Fare Lady"	Fox
2015 (67th)	Dan Castellaneta	The Simpsons	Homer Simpson	"Bart's New Friend"	Fox
2015 (67th)	John Roberts	Bob's Burgers	Linda Belcher, Tim	"Eat, Spray, Linda"	Fox
2016 (68th)
2016 (68th)	Seth MacFarlane	Family Guy	Peter Griffin, Stewie Griffin, Brian Griffin, Glenn Quagmire, Dr. Hartman, Tom Tucker, Mr. Spacely	"Pilling Them Softly"	Fox
2016 (68th)	Keegan-Michael Key	SuperMansion	American Ranger, Sgt. Agony	"Puss in Books"	Crackle
2016 (68th)	Chris Pine	SuperMansion	Dr. Devizo, Robo-Dino	"The Inconceivable Escape of Dr. Devizo"	Crackle
2016 (68th)	Trey Parker	South Park	Eric Cartman, PC Principal	"Stunning and Brave"	Comedy Central
2016 (68th)	Matt Stone	South Park	Craig Tucker, Tweek, Thomas Tucker	"Tweek x Craig"	Comedy Central
2017 (69th)
2017 (69th)	Seth MacFarlane	Family Guy	Peter Griffin, Stewie Griffin, Brian Griffin, Glenn Quagmire	"The Boys in the Band"	Fox
2017 (69th)	Dee Bradley Baker	American Dad!	Klaus Heissler	"Fight and Flight"	TBS
2017 (69th)	Nancy Cartwright	The Simpsons	Bart Simpson	"Looking for Mr. Goodbart"	Fox
2017 (69th)	Kevin Kline	Bob's Burgers	Mr. Fischoeder	"The Last Gingerbread House on the Left"	Fox
2017 (69th)	Mo Collins	F Is for Family	Ginny, Jimmy Fitzsimmons, Lex, Ben, Cutie Pie	"Pray Away"	Netflix
2017 (69th)	Kristen Schaal	BoJack Horseman	Sarah Lynn	"That's Too Much, Man!"	Netflix
2018 (70th)
2018 (70th)	Alex Borstein	Family Guy	Lois Griffin, Babs Pewterschmidt, Natalia, Female Hippo, Woman in Car, Female Voice	"Nanny Goats"	Fox
2018 (70th)	Seth MacFarlane	American Dad!	Stan Smith, Roger Smith	"The Talented Mr. Dingleberry"	TBS
2018 (70th)	Seth MacFarlane	Family Guy	Stewie Griffin, Brian Griffin	"Send in Stewie, Please"	Fox
2018 (70th)	Dan Castellaneta	The Simpsons	Homer Simpson, Krusty the Clown, Groundskeeper Willie, Sideshow Mel	"Fears of a Clown"	Fox
2018 (70th)	Russi Taylor	Mickey Mouse	Huey, Dewey, Louie, Grandma, The Witch, Minnie Mouse	"The Scariest Story Ever: A Mickey Mouse Halloween Spooktacular!"	Disney
2019 (71st)
2019 (71st)	Seth MacFarlane	Family Guy	Peter Griffin, Stewie Griffin, Brian Griffin, Glenn Quagmire, Tom Tucker, Seamus	"Con Heiress"	Fox
2019 (71st)	Eric Jacobson	Sesame Street	Bert, Grover, Oscar	"When You Wish Upon a Pickle: A Sesame Street Special"	HBO
2019 (71st)	Hank Azaria	The Simpsons	Moe Szyslak, Carl, Duffman, Kirk	"From Russia Without Love"	Fox
2019 (71st)	Alex Borstein	Family Guy	Lois Griffin, Tricia Takanawa	"Throw It Away"	Fox
2019 (71st)	Kevin Michael Richardson	F Is for Family	Rosie	"The Stinger"	Netflix

=== 2020s ===
Year	Actor	Program	Role	Episode	Network
2020 (72nd)
2020 (72nd)	Maya Rudolph	Big Mouth	Connie the Hormone Monstress	"How to Have an Orgasm"	Netflix
2020 (72nd)	Hank Azaria	The Simpsons	Professor Frink, Moe, Chief Wiggum, Carl, Cletus, Kirk, Sea Captain	"Frinkcoin"	Fox
2020 (72nd)	Nancy Cartwright	The Simpsons	Bart Simpson, Nelson, Ralph, Todd	"Better Off Ned"	Fox
2020 (72nd)	Leslie Odom, Jr.	Central Park	Owen Tillerman	"Episode 1"	Apple TV+
2020 (72nd)	Wanda Sykes	Crank Yankers	Gladys	"Bobby Brown, Wanda Sykes & Kathy Griffin"	Comedy Central
2020 (72nd)	Taika Waititi	The Mandalorian	IG-11	"Chapter 8: Redemption"	Disney+
2021 (73rd)
2021 (73rd)	Maya Rudolph	Big Mouth	Connie the Hormone Monstress	"A Very Special 9/11 Episode"	Netflix
2021 (73rd)	Stacey Abrams	Black-ish	Stacey Abrams	"Election Special, Part 2"	ABC
2021 (73rd)	Julie Andrews	Bridgerton	Lady Whistledown	"Diamond of the First Water"	Netflix
2021 (73rd)	Seth MacFarlane	Family Guy	Peter Griffin, Stewie Griffin, Brian Griffin, Glenn Quagmire	"Stewie's First Word"	Fox
2021 (73rd)	Tituss Burgess	Central Park	Cole Tillerman	"A Fish Called Snakehead"	Apple TV+
2021 (73rd)	Stanley Tucci	Central Park	Bitsy Brandenham	"A Fish Called Snakehead"	Apple TV+
2021 (73rd)	Jessica Walter (posthumous)	Archer	Malory Archer	"The Double Date"	FXX
2022 (74th)
2022 (74th)	Chadwick Boseman (posthumous)	What If...?	Star Lord T'Challa	"What If... T'Challa Became a Star-Lord?"	Disney+
2022 (74th)	F. Murray Abraham	Moon Knight	Khonshu	"The Friendly Type"	Disney+
2022 (74th)	Julie Andrews	Bridgerton	Lady Whistledown	"Capital R Rake"	Netflix
2022 (74th)	Maya Rudolph	Big Mouth	Connie the Hormone Monstress	"A Very Big Mouth Christmas"	Netflix
2022 (74th)	Stanley Tucci	Central Park	Bitsy Brandenham	"Central Dark"	Apple TV+
2022 (74th)	Jessica Walter (posthumous)	Archer	Malory Archer	"London Time"	FXX
2022 (74th)	Jeffrey Wright	What If...?	The Watcher	"What If... Ultron Won?"	Disney+
2023 (75th)
2023 (75th)	Maya Rudolph	Big Mouth	Connie the Hormone Monstress	"Asexual Healing"	Netflix
2023 (75th)	Julie Andrews	Queen Charlotte: A Bridgerton Story	Lady Whistledown	"Honeymoon Bliss"	Netflix
2023 (75th)	Alex Borstein	Family Guy	Lois Griffin	"A Bottle Episode"	Fox
2023 (75th)	Mel Brooks	History of the World, Part II	The Narrator	"VIII"	Hulu
2023 (75th)	Wanda Sykes	Crank Yankers	Gladys	"Wanda Sykes, JB Smoove & Adam Carolla"	Comedy Central
2023 (75th)	Ali Wong	Tuca & Bertie	Bertie	"Fledging Day"	Adult Swim
2024 (76th)
2024 (76th)	Maya Rudolph	Big Mouth	Connie the Hormone Monstress	"The Ambition Gremlin"	Netflix
2024 (76th)	Hank Azaria	The Simpsons	Moe Szyslak	"Cremains of the Day"	Fox
2024 (76th)	Alex Borstein	Family Guy	Lois Griffin	"Teacher's Heavy Pet"	Fox
2024 (76th)	Sterling K. Brown	Invincible	Angstrom Levy / Angstrom #646	"I Thought You Were Stronger"	Prime Video
2024 (76th)	Hannah Waddingham	Krapopolis	Deliria	"Big Man on Hippocampus"	Fox
2025 (77th)
2025 (77th)	Julie Andrews	Bridgerton	Lady Whistledown	"Into the Light"	Netflix
2025 (77th)	Hank Azaria	The Simpsons	Moe Szyslak	"Abe League of Their Moe"	Fox
2025 (77th)	Maya Rudolph	Big Mouth	Connie the Hormone Monstress	"Why Do We Go Through Puberty?"	Netflix
2025 (77th)	Alan Tudyk	Andor	K-2SO	"Who Else Knows?"	Disney+
2025 (77th)	Jeffrey Wright	What If...?	The Watcher	"What If... 1872?"	Disney+
2025 (77th)	Steven Yeun	Invincible	Mark Grayson / Invincible	"What Have I Done?"	Prime Video
2026 (78th)
2026 (78th)	Julie Andrews	Bridgerton	Lady Whistledown	"The Waltz"	Netflix
2026 (78th)	Pamela Adlon	King of the Hill	Bobby Hill	"Any Given Hill-Day"	Hulu
2026 (78th)	Hank Azaria	The Simpsons	Gary Chalmers	"Keep Chalm and Gary On"	Fox
2026 (78th)	Trey Parker	South Park	Satan	"The Crap Out"	Comedy Central
2026 (78th)	Matt Vogel	The Muppet Show	Kermit the Frog		Disney+
2026 (78th)	Steven Yeun	Invincible	Mark Grayson / Invincible	"Don't Leave Me Hanging Here"	Prime Video

== Performers with multiple wins ==
Totals include wins for Outstanding Voice-Over Performance.

4 wins

- Hank Azaria
- Dan Castellaneta
- Seth MacFarlane
- Maya Rudolph

2 wins

- Julie Andrews
- Ja'net Dubois
- Maurice LaMarche

== Performers with multiple nominations ==
Totals include nominations for Outstanding Voice-Over Performance.

12 nominations

- Hank Azaria

11 nominations

- Seth MacFarlane

8 nominations

- Dan Castellaneta

6 nominations

- Seth Green
- Maya Rudolph

5 nominations

- Alex Borstein
- Julie Andrews

3 nominations

- Nancy Cartwright
- Maurice LaMarche

2 nominations

- Pamela Adlon
- Bob Bergen
- Ja'net Dubois
- Trey Parker
- Harry Shearer
- Wanda Sykes
- Stanley Tucci
- Jessica Walter
- Jeffrey Wright
- Steven Yeun
