= Angstrom Levy =

Supervillain appearing in Invincible Comics

- Angstrom Levy as depicted in Invincible #103 (2013)

Publication information
- Publisher: Image Comics
- First appearance: Invincible #16 (August 2004)
- Created by: Robert Kirkman (writer); Ryan Ottley (artist)
- Voiced by: Sterling K. Brown (Invincible); Aaron Pierce (Invincible VS)

In-story information
- Alter ego: Multiversal traveler
- Species: Human (enhanced)
- Place of origin: Earth
- Team affiliations: None
- Notable aliases: None
- Abilities: Interdimensional teleportation; Superhuman intelligence; Clairvoyance; Superhuman Strength; Enhanced Durability

Angstrom Levy is a supervillain appearing in American comic books published by Image Comics. He is a prominent antagonist in the comic book series Invincible, created by writer Robert Kirkman and artist Ryan Ottley. Introduced in issue #16 in 2004, Levy initially seeks to improve his own reality by acquiring knowledge from alternate versions of himself throughout the multiverse. However, circumstances twist him into a sociopathic, amoral, and narcissistic man.

== Publication history ==
Angstrom Levy was created by Robert Kirkman and Ryan Ottley as part of the early expansion of the Invincible universe. He first appeared in Invincible #16 and quickly became one of the central villains in the series, particularly due to his ability to manipulate alternate realities.

== Fictional character biography ==
Angstrom Levy is introduced in the Invincible comic book series as a scientist with the ability to access parallel dimensions. Initially motivated by a desire to advance knowledge and improve his own world, Levy constructs a device capable of merging the memories of his alternate-universe counterparts. Assisted by the Mauler Twins, he begins the process of integrating the experiences of numerous versions of himself. However, the procedure is abruptly interrupted by the superhero Invincible (Mark Grayson), resulting in a catastrophic explosion. The accident leaves Levy physically disfigured and psychologically unstable, now burdened with the conflicting memories of multiple realities.

Before the accident, Levy appeared as a tall, slender African-American man, typically wearing a blue shirt and black trousers, with brown eyes, a small pointed beard (goatee), and short black hair. After the explosion, his appearance was drastically altered. Most of his hair was burned off, his skull and upper spine were severely enlarged with pronounced veins. Also resulting in him requiring life-support devices, including spinal bracing and a nasal apparatus. In order to conceal his past identity, Levy often wore a dark cloak.

Following his transformation, Levy comes to blame Invincible for his transformation. He begins targeting him across dimensions. Over time, Levy adopts increasingly aggressive strategies, frequently resurfacing to challenge Invincible and destabilize global affairs. At one point, he dons a formal black-and-red suit obtained from another reality during one of his missions.

In a later arc, after another failed plan involving a group of evil Invincible variants, Levy is gravely injured. He is rescued and medically enhanced by a group known as the Technicians, who implant cybernetic modifications, including head implants and a spinal support system. His facial injuries leave him blind in one eye and marked by visible scarring. He begins wearing a black and silver armored suit and a red cape. Though now operating under the supervision of the Technicians, Levy remains a reluctant participant in their plans, continuing to use his dimensional abilities for their purposes.

Levy’s ongoing conflict with Invincible underscores several of the series’ thematic concerns, including the unintended consequences of technological ambition, the psychological cost of trauma, and the ethical challenges posed by access to multiversal power. Despite multiple defeats and apparent deaths, Levy repeatedly returns with greater hostility, playing a significant role in the development of both Mark Grayson's character and the broader narrative.

== Powers and abilities ==
Levy's primary superhuman ability is interdimensional teleportation. He can open portals to alternate realities, which he uses both as a strategic advantage in battle and to accumulate knowledge. His exposure to numerous versions of himself across the multiverse has made him extremely intelligent, but mentally unstable. After his failed mind-merging experiment, he also gains enhanced strength and durability.

== Reception ==
Levy has been recognized as one of the most significant and dangerous villains in Invincible. Critics have praised his complex motivations, tragic backstory, and his unique use of the multiverse concept, which predates its mainstream use in other superhero media. Sterling K. Brown received a nomination for Outstanding Character Voice-Over Performance at the 76th Primetime Creative Arts Emmy Awards for his portrayal of Angstrom Levy in the episode "I Thought You Were Stronger".

== In other media ==
Angstrom Levy appears in the animated adaptation of Invincible produced by Amazon Prime Video, first appearing in its second season. He is voiced by Sterling K. Brown. Angstrom appears as a playable character in Invincible VS as part of the game's first season pass of downloadable content.

== See also ==
- Invincible (comic book)
- List of Invincible characters
- Multiverse (fiction)
