= Catherine Winder =

Canadian media producer and executive

Catherine Winder is a Canadian digital media producer and executive.

Winder served as President of Rainmaker Entertainment from May 12, 2009 to June 30, 2012.

Winder is a native of Toronto, Ontario, Canada and began her film career in Japan, which she later said helped her in adopting anime and manga elements into the Star Wars: The Clone Wars animation style.
