= Todd Nauck =

American comic book artist and writer

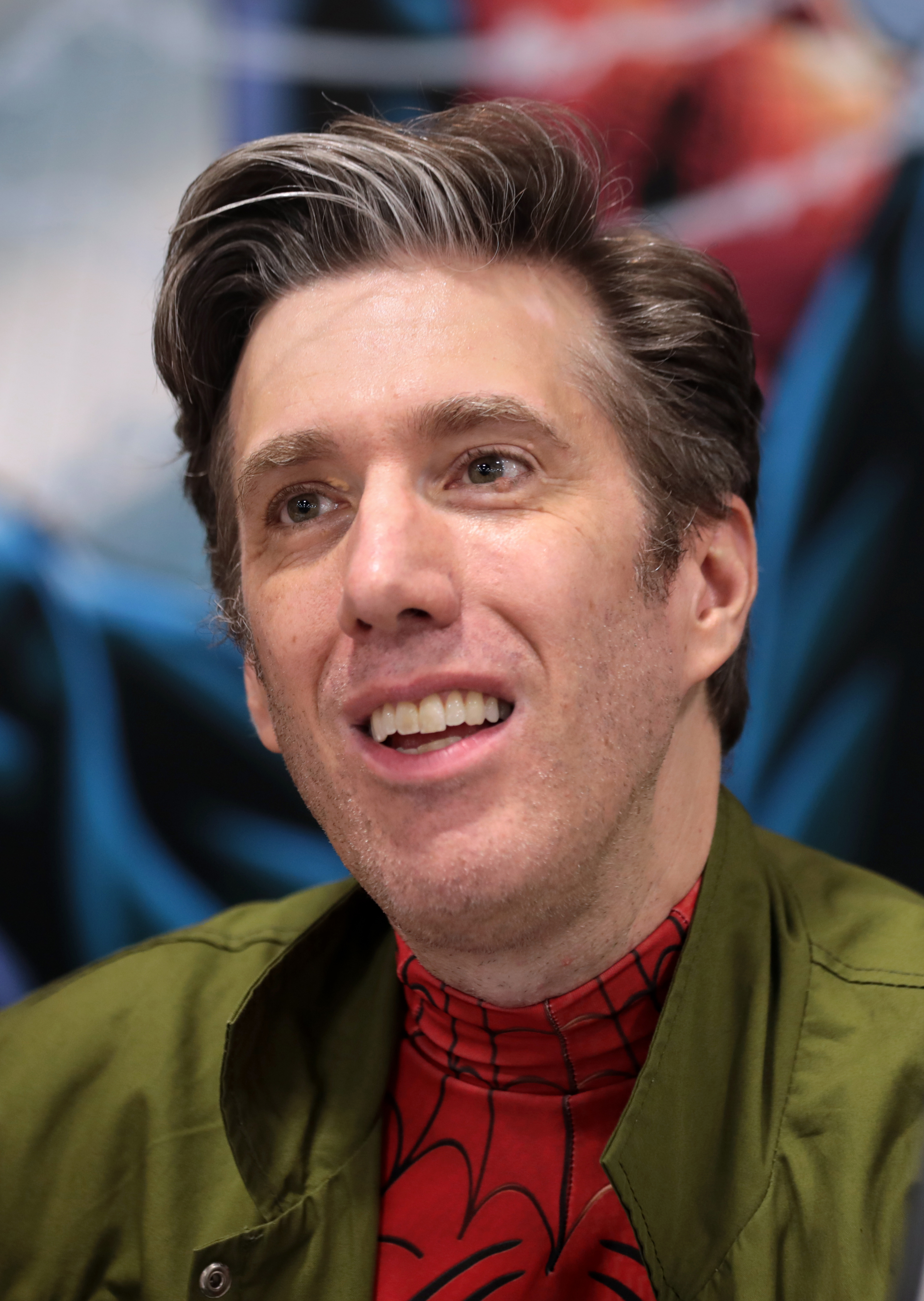
- Nauck in June 2023
- Born: 1971 (age 54–55)
- Areas: Penciller, inker, writer, colorist
- Notable works: Friendly Neighborhood Spider-Man; Young Justice; Wildguard

Todd Nauck (/nɔːk/ NAWK; born 1971) is an American comic book creator. Nauck is most notable for his work on Friendly Neighborhood Spider-Man, Young Justice, Gwen Stacy, and his own creation, Wildguard.

== Career ==
Nauck's first assignment from Marvel Comics was writing, penciling and inking "Mutant Mishaps", a story that was published on the back cover of What The--?! #21 (September 1992). He subsequently wrote and illustrated the "Mutant Mishaps" story that appeared in What The--? #25 (Summer 1993).

In early 1994, Nauck was hired by Rob Liefeld's Extreme Studios of Image Comics when a friend from art school showed his WildGuard work to Dan Fraga at a comic book convention, who in turn showed it to Liefeld, which led to Nauck's first Image work. Nauck went on to draw such series as Badrock and Co., New Men, New Force, Supreme, Youngblood and Team Youngblood. By 1997, Nauck began work with DC Comics. After drawing several Legion of Super-Heroes stories, he helped launch the Young Justice series with writer Peter David. Nauck drew 53 issues of the 55 issue run of the series, including three double-sized issues and a portion of the Young Justice/Spyboy crossover mini-series.

Nauck published his creator-owned series, Wildguard, with Image Comics. The series was patterned after a reality television show competition, in which various wannabe superheroes competed for a spot on a new superhero team, and judged by a panel of judges, as on the television series American Idol.

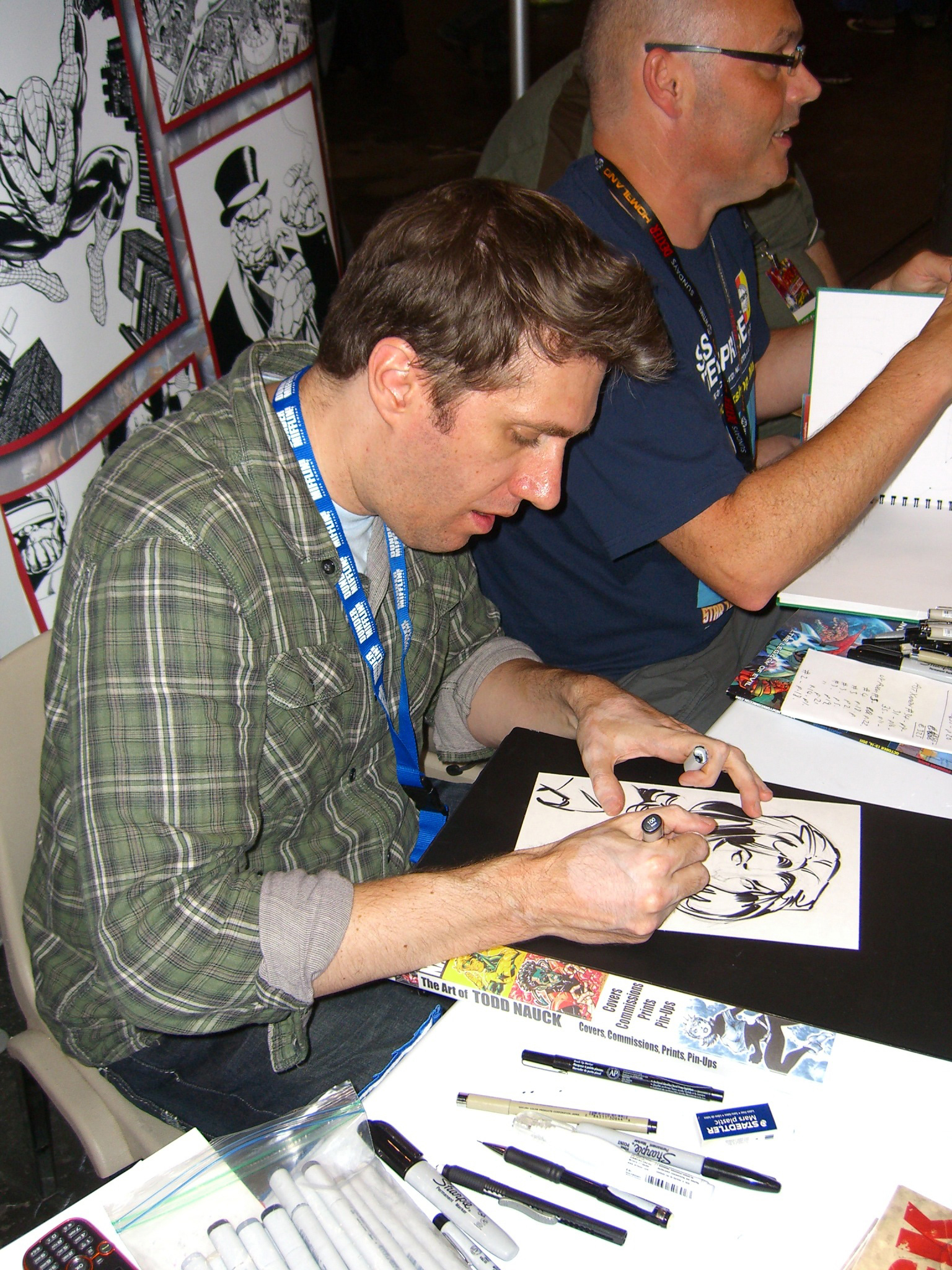
Nauck doing a Donna Troy sketch at the 2011 New York Comic Con. Beside him is Andy Lanning.

Nauck's other work includes Teen Titans (Volume 3) #32-33, Teen Titans Go!, Friendly Neighborhood Spider-Man #11-13 and 17–23, American Dream #1-5, Spider-Man: the Clone Saga #1-6, Amazing Spider-Man #628 and the covers for X-Campus #1-4.

Nauck was the artist of the much-publicized five-page back-up story that appeared in The Amazing Spider-Man #583, which was published in January 2009, and featured a cameo appearance by then-President-elect Barack Obama.

Nauck's art was featured in the eighth-season finale of the reality television show Extreme Makeover: Home Edition, which aired May 15, 2011. In the episode, he and colorist John Rauch, on behalf of Marvel Custom Solutions, designed life-sized Marvel Comics superheroes on the bedroom wall of the show's beneficiary, Patrick Sharrock, a 9-year-old boy with brittle bone disease, and depicted Sharrock himself as a superhero named Dr. Scorcher. They also provided similar art for the episode's scene transitions, which depicted Ty Pennington, Xzibit, and the rest of the show's cast as superheroes as well.

Nauck would continue his work with Marvel Custom Solutions, teaming with writer C. B. Cebulski and kitchenware retailer Williams Sonoma to raise awareness of child hunger for Share Our Strength in Spider-Man and the Avengers #1. The twelve-page story features Edwin Jarvis hosting a cooking demonstration interrupted by the Frightful Four.

In 2012, Nauck signed on with Robert Kirkman's Skybound Entertainment at Image Comics to draw the second volume of the Invincible spin-off series, Guarding the Globe, which ran for six issues before relaunching in 2013 as Invincible Universe which ran for twelve issues.

In 2018, Nauck joined Dark Horse Comics to draw the six mini-series Mystery Science Theater 3000: The Comic, drawing the "host segments" of the comic.

== Bibliography ==
=== Dark Horse Comics ===
- Spyboy / Young Justice #1-3
- Star Wars Tales #15

==== DC Comics ====
- 52 #11, 13
- DC's Very Merry Multiverse #1
- Justice League Incarnate #3
- Justice Society of America #12
- Legends of the Legion #1, 4
- Legion of Super-Heroes #102
- Stargirl:
  - Infinite Frontier #0 (untitled 4-page story, with Geoff Johns, anthology, 2021) collected in Infinite Frontier (hc, 352 pages, 2022, ISBN 1-77951-424-7; tpb, 2023, ISBN 1-77951-998-2)
  - Stargirl: The Lost Children (tpb, 184 pages, 2023, ISBN 1-77951-846-3) collects:
    - Stargirl Spring Break Special (with Geoff Johns and Bryan Hitch, 2021)
    - Stargirl: The Lost Children #1–6 (with Geoff Johns, 2023)
- Superman:
  - Superman: The Man of Steel: "Diamonds and Steel" (with Geoff Johns, in #121, 2002)
  - Superman: Lex 2000 #1
- Superboy and the Ravers #19
- Supergirl #70
- Teen Titans:
  - Teen Titans vol. 3 (with Geoff Johns (#31–33)
  - Teen Titans Go! Digest (with J. Torres):
    - Vol. 1: Truth, Justice, Pizza (ISBN 1-4012-0333-7)
    - Vol. 2: Heroes on Patrol (ISBN 1-4012-0334-5)
    - Vol. 3: Bring It On (ISBN 1-4012-0511-9)
    - Vol. 4: Ready for Action (ISBN 1-4012-0985-8)
    - Vol. 5: On the Move (ISBN 1-4012-0986-6)
    - Vol. 6: Titans Together (ISBN 1-4012-1563-7) (trade paperback that continues the issue numbering)
- The Flash (Vol. 5) #779, 782, 788, 800
- Young Justice:
  - Young Justice #1-10, 12-23, 25-55, #1000000 (1998–2003)
  - Young Justice: A League of Their Own (with Peter David), DC Comics, 2000. ISBN 1-84023-197-1
- New History of the DC Universe #1
- The Flash #800: "The Max in the Mirror" (with Mark Waid, co-feature, 2023)

=== Dynamite Comics ===
- Army of Darkness: Ash Saves Obama #1-6

=== Marvel Comics ===
- Amazing Fantasy #1000
- American Dream #1–5 (2008)
- Cosmic Ghost Rider Destroys Marvel History #2, 4, 6
- Deadpool: Too Soon? Infinite Comic #1-8
- Gwen Stacy #1-5 (with Christos Gage, 2020-2022)
- I Am An Avenger #3
- Infinity Warps
- Infinity Wars: Sleepwalker #1-4
- Inhumanity #1–2 (with Matt Fraction, Olivier Coipel, Leinil Francis Yu, Dustin Weaver and Nick Bradshaw, 2014) collected in Inhumanity (hc, 448 pages, 2014, ISBN 0-7851-9033-3; tpb, 2015, ISBN 0-7851-9034-1)
- Magneto #1-4
- Marvel Apes #1–3 (2009)
- Marvel Future Fight #1
- Marvel Legacy Primer Pages: Ben Reilly: Scarlet Spider & Spider-Man / Deadpool (one page stories) (2017)
- Nightcrawler #1-12 (2014–2015)
- Spider-Man:
  - Friendly Neighborhood Spider-Man #11–13, 17-23 (2005–2007)
  - Spider-Man: The Clone Saga #1–6 (2009–2010)
  - Amazing Spider-Man & Silk: Spider(Fly) Effect Infinite Comic #1-8
  - Spidey: School's Out #1-6
  - Spider-Man/Deadpool #12, 14 and 21-23 (2016–2017)
  - The Sensational Spider-Man #24, 26
  - The Amazing Spider-Man:
    - Peter Parker: Unemployed (co-written by Waid and Tom Peyer, art by Nauck, free digital mini-comic, 2010)
    - Election Day (hc, 184 pages, 2009, ISBN 0-7851-3395-X; tpb, 2010, ISBN 0-7851-3419-0) includes:
      - "Spidey Meets the President!" (with Zeb Wells, in #583, 2009)
    - The Amazing Spider-Man (Vol. 4) #25
    - The Amazing Spider-Man (Vol. 5) #25, 74
    - The Amazing Spider-Man (Vol. 6) #6, 47-48, 50-53, 60
    - The Amazing Spider-Man (Vol. 7) #8, 14, 20-22
    - The Amazing Spider-Man: You're Hired!
    - The Amazing Spider-Man: Going Big
- Peter Parker #5
- Pooluminati #1
- Rocket Raccoon: Rocket Rewind #1
- The Amazing Spider-Man Family #3-5
- The Amazing Spider-Girl #25
- Thor: Lightning and Lament #1
- Venom (Vol. 6) #250
- X-Men: Legends #5-6
- X-Men: The Wedding Special #1

==== Image Comics ====
- Badrock Annual #1
- Badrock / Wolverine #1
- Badrock and Company #1-6
- New Force #1-4

==== Skybound ====
Titles published under Skybound (imprint of Image as well as a multimedia company co-founded by Kirkman in 2010) include:

- Guardians of the Globe:
  - Guarding the Globe vol. 2 #1–6 (written by Phil Hester, drawn by Nauck, 2012–2013) collected as Guarding the Globe: Hard to Kill (tpb, 160 pages, 2013, ISBN 1-60706-673-4)
  - Invincible Universe (written by Phil Hester, drawn by Nauck, 2013–2014) collected as:
    - On Deadly Ground (collects #1–6, tpb, 144 pages, 2013, ISBN 1-60706-820-6)
    - Above the Law (collects #7–12, tpb, 144 pages, 2014, ISBN 1-60706-986-5)

==== Other publishers ====
- Spider-Man / Superman #1 (Marvel / DC)

==== As writer and artist ====
- What The--?! #25
- WildGuard: Fool's Gold #1-2
- WildGuard: Fire Power
- WildGuard: Casting Call #1-6
