= Ryan Ottley =

American comic artist

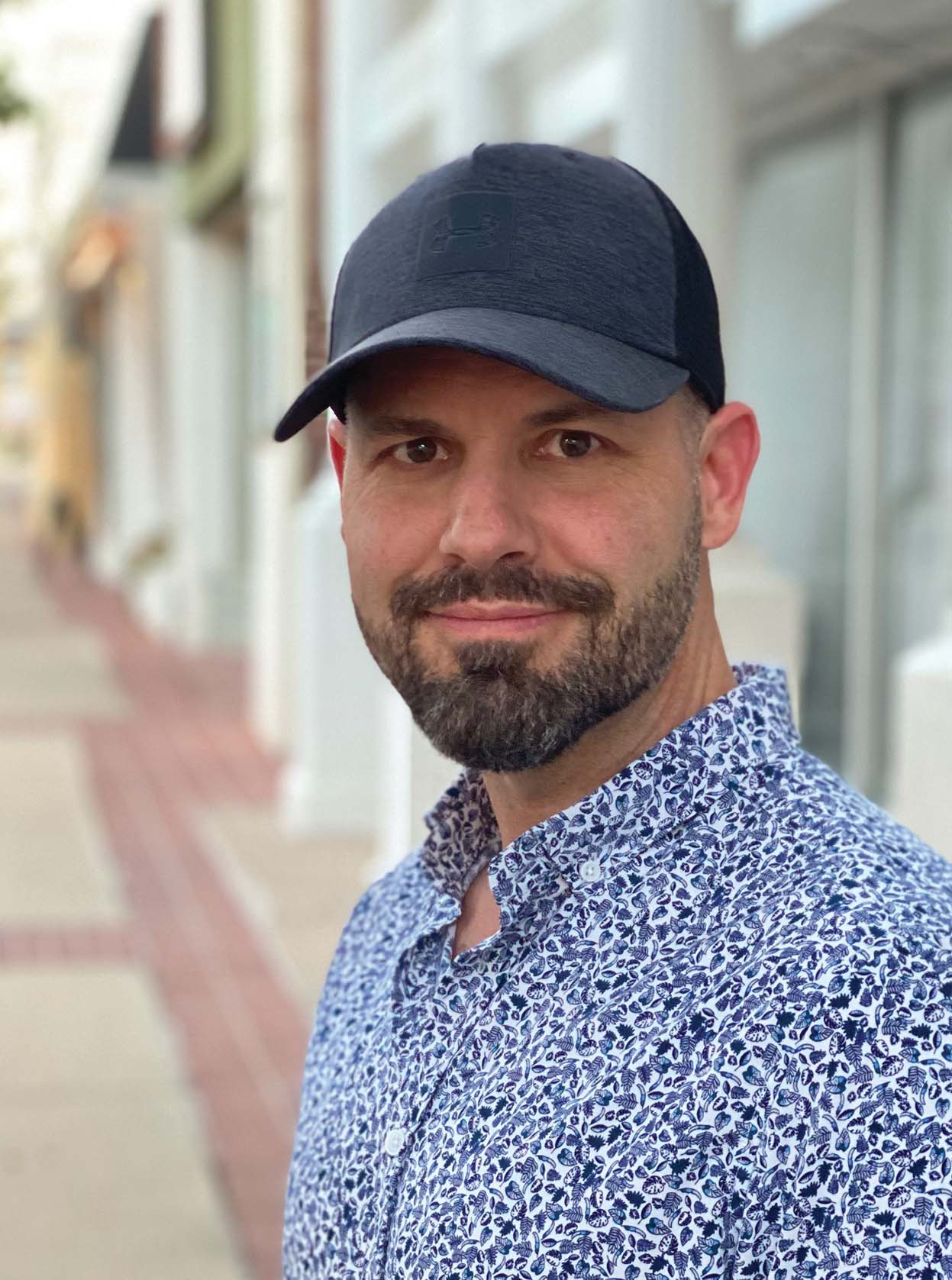
- Ottley in June 2021
- Born: 8 August 1975 (age 51)
- Areas: Writer, Penciller, Artist, Inker
- Pseudonyms: WyA, old signature on early Invincible
- Notable works: Invincible; The Amazing Spider-Man; Haunt; Grizzly Shark; Hulk; Battle Beast

Ryan Ottley (born 1975) is an American comic book artist and writer, best known for work on Image Comics' Invincible and Battle Beast and Marvel Comics' Amazing Spider-Man and Hulk.

== Career ==
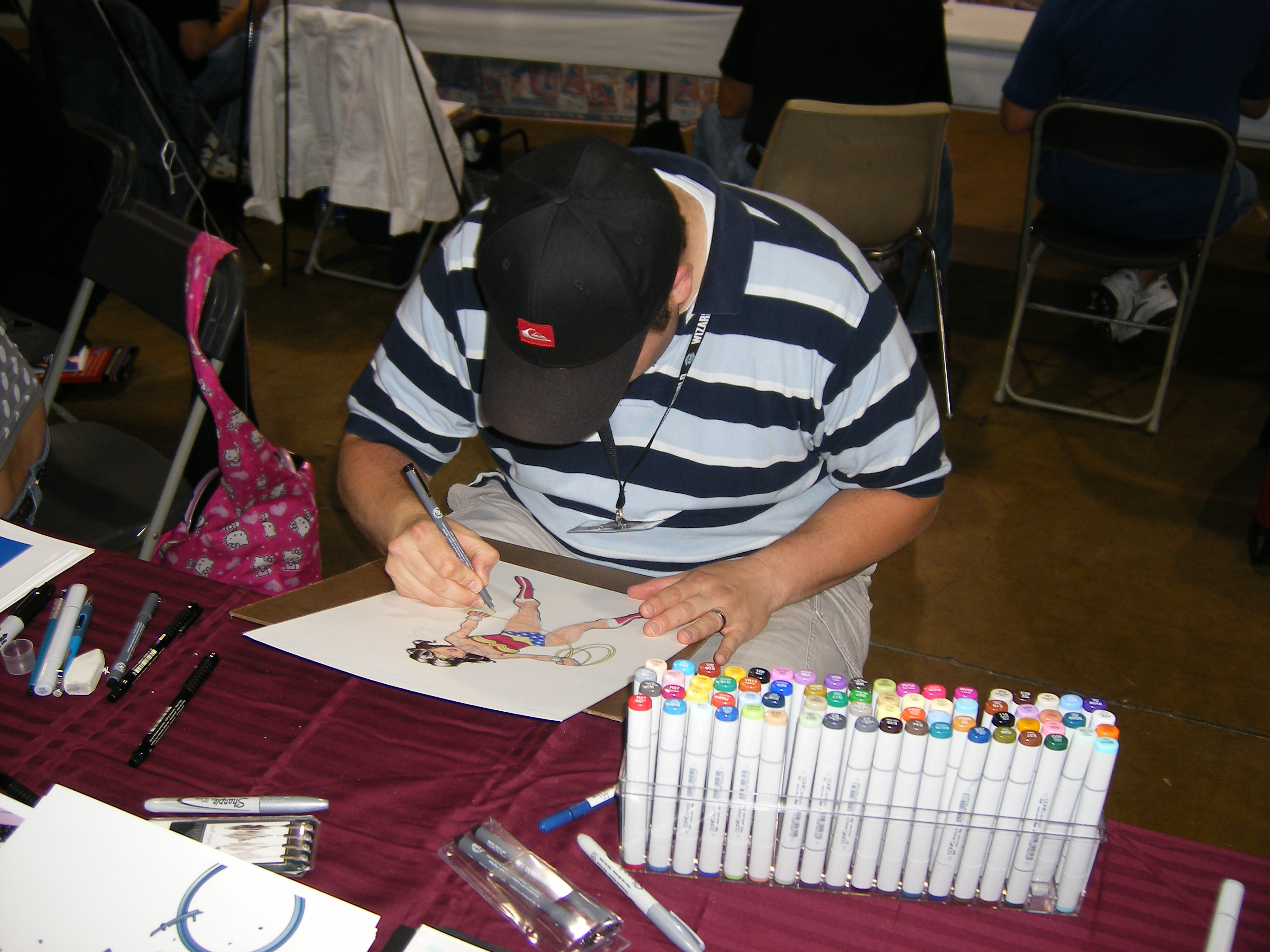
Ottley sketching at the Wizard World Chicago in Chicago, August 4, 2006.

Ottley began drawing Invincible with issue 8, and continued on the book for 14 years, drawing 127 issues of its 144-issue run. During the course of his work on the book he co-created characters including Battle Beast, Angstrom Levy, Conquest, and Powerplex.

In an interview with comic book website Project Fanboy, Ottley discussed how he got into the comic book industry after being fired from his previous job working in a medical supply warehouse. Ottley decided now was a great time to try to get into comics again and began actively building exposure for his work on the internet through the websites digitalwebbing.com and penciljack.com.

Ottley penciled the first five issues of Kirkman and Todd McFarlane's Haunt, an ongoing series which debuted October 7, 2009. Ottley indicated on the letters page of issue #5 that he left in order to focus on Invincible.

In 2012, Ottley was one of several artists to illustrate a variant cover for Robert Kirkman's The Walking Dead #100, which was released July 11 at San Diego Comic-Con.

In 2016, Image Comics published Grizzly Shark, a three-issue miniseries written and drawn by Ottley, and has an average critics rating of 7.1 out of 10 on the review aggregator website Comic Book Roundup.

In 2018 Marvel Comics relaunched a new volume of The Amazing Spider-Man, with writer Nick Spencer. Ottley supplied the art for 20 issues of the run. He co-created the villain Kindred with Nick Spencer. His work drew praise from Jesse Schedeen of IGN, who stated, "Ottley's expressive figure work and dynamic fight scenes make him a natural fit."

In 2021, Ottley was announced as the artist on that year's relaunched Hulk, teaming him with writer Donny Cates. In November 2022, it was announced that following Cates departure as writer of Hulk for personal reasons, Ottley would take over as the writer for the remainder of the series, starting with issue 11.

In December 2024, it was announced that Kirkman and Ottley were developing a prequel spin-off series entitled Invincible Universe: Battle Beast, with the first issue of the series set to debut April 2025. In 2026, Ottley was a recipient of the Inkpot Award at the annual San Diego Comic Con.

== Bibliography ==
=== Interior work ===
- Invincible #8-65, #68-84, #87-126, #133-144 (Image Comics, 2004-2018)
- Image Comics Summer Special (Image Comics, Free Comic Day 2004)
- Superman/Batman Annual #1 (DC Comics, 2006)
- Death Grub #1 (Image Comics, 2008)
- Fablewood Anthology (Ape Entertainment, 2008)
- Haunt #1-5 (Image Comics, 2009-2010)
- Image United #0 (Image Comics, 2010)
- Invincible Returns #1 (Image Comics, 2010)
- The Walking Dead #75 (Image Comics, 2010)
- Solution Squad #1 (Solution Squad LLC, 2013)
- Tales of Army of Darkness #1 (Dynamite Entertainment, 2013)
- Grizzly Shark #1-3 (Image Comics, 2016)
- The Amazing Spider-Man #1 (Marvel Comics, Free Comic Day 2018)
- The Amazing Spider-Man vol. 5 #1-5, 11-13, 16, 23-25, 30-31, 37, 41-43, 49 (Marvel Comics, 2018-2020)
- Solid Blood #17 (Image Comics, 2020)
- Avengers/Hulk #11 (Marvel Comics, Free Comic Day 2021)
- Hulk #1-6, #9-14 (Marvel Comics, 2021-2023)
- Skybound X #25 (Image Comics, 2022)
- Violence & Pogo Sticks: The Art of Ryan Ottley #1 (Image Comics, 2024)
- Energon Universe 2024 Special (Image Comics, 2024)
- Battle Beast #1-13 (Image Comics, 2025-2027)

=== Covers work ===
- Hack/Slash: Slice Hard #0 (Devils Due Publishing, 2006)
- The Astounding Wolf-Man #3 (Image Comics, 2007)
- Brit vol. 2 #7-12 (Image Comics, 2008-2009)
- Noble Causes #37 (Image Comics, 2008)
- Guarding the Globe #1 (Image Comics, 2010)
- Haunt #13 (Image Comics, 2011)
- Head Lopper #7 (Image Comics, 2017)
- The Amazing Spider-Man vol. 5 #14, 26-29, 40 (Marvel Comics, 2019-2020)
- The Amazing Spider-Man: Sins Rising Prelude #1 (Marvel Comics, 2020)
- The Amazing Spider-Man: The Sins of Norman Osborn #1 (Marvel Comics, 2020)
- Hector Plasm: Hunt the Bigfoot #1 (Image Comics, 2025)
- Capes Remastered #1-6 (Image Comics 2025-2026)
- Final Boss #1 (Image Comics, 2026)
- Invincible Omnibus #1 (Image Comics, 2026)
- Invincible Omnibus #2 (Image Comics, 2027)

==== Variant covers ====
- Critter #1 (Big Dog Ink, 2011)
- Teenage Mutant Ninja Turtles #12 (IDW Publishing, 2012)
- The Walking Dead #100, 150 (Image Comics, 2012, 2016)
- Burn the Orphanage: Born to Lose #2 (Image Comics, 2013)
- Manifest Destiny #1 (Image Comics, 2013)
- The Amazing Spider-Man vol. 3 #8 (Marvel Comics, 2014)
- The Flash #35 (DC Comics, 2014)
- Inhuman #5 (Marvel Comics, 2014)
- Chrononauts #1 (Image Comics, 2015)
- Justice League of America Rebirth #1 (DC Comics, 2016)
- The Amazing Spider-Man vol. 4 #1.2 (Marvel Comics, 2016)
- Robin: Son of Batman #10 (DC Comics, 2016)
- Reborn #2 (Image Comics, 2016)
- The War of the Realms #1 (Marvel Comics, 2019)
- Murder Falcon #4 (Image Comics, 2019)
- Strange Academy #3 (Marvel Comics, 2020)
- Savage Dragon #250 (Image Comics, 2020)
- Maestro #4 (Marvel Comics, 2020)
- Crossover #1 (Image Comics, 2020)
- Ultramega #3 (Image Comics, 2021)
- Thor vol. 6 #10 (Marvel Comics, 2021)
- Carnage: Black, White and Blood #11 (Marvel Comics, 2021)
- Vanish #2 (Image Comics, 2022)
- Remote Space #1 (Image Comics, 2024)
- Absolute Batman #1 (DC Comics, 2024)
- G.I. Joe #3 (Image Comics, 2024)
- Arcbound #1 (Dark Horse Comics, 2024)
- Precious Metal #6 (Image Comics, 2024)
- Curse of Sherlee Johnson #1 (Image Comics, 2025)
- Wolverine: Revenge #11 (Marvel Comics, 2025)
- Absolute Wonder Woman #4 (DC Comics, 2025)
- The Missionary #3 (DSTLRY Comics, 2025)
- Skinbreaker #1 (Image Comics, 2025)
- Youngblood #1 (Image Comics, 2025)
- D'Orc #1 (Image Comics, 2026)
- Marvel Team-Up #14 (Marvel Comics, 2026)
- Invincible VS (Skybound Games, 2026)
- Invincible #1 (Image Comics, 2026)
- Shaolin Cowboy Staying A.I. Live #1 (Dark Horse Comics, 2026)
- Red Roots #1 (Image Comics, 2026)
- The Last Driver #1 (Image Comics, 2026)
- Absolute Batman #24 (DC Comics, 2026)
- Dungeon Crawler Carl #1 (Vault Comics, 2027)
