= Cliff Rathburn =

American comic book artist

- Areas: Penciller, Inker, Colourist
- Notable works: Brit; The Walking Dead
- Awards: Inkwell Award for The "SPAMI" Award (2011)

Clifford G. "Cliff" Rathburn is an American comic book artist. He pencils, inks, colors and greyscales.

== Career ==
Rathburn did some early work at DC Comics. He later known for providing the greyscale coloring for Robert Kirkman's long-running series The Walking Dead at Image Comics. Also at Image he did the artwork on Kirkman's Reaper and Brit one-shots before going on to provide the complete art for the first six issues of Brit, his first ongoing series. In between he also worked at Marvel Comics.

Rathburn inked the pencils of Simon Coleby and Tony Harris on The Authority and War Heroes, respectively.

== Awards ==
In 2011 Rathburn was awarded the Inkwell Awards' S.P.A.M.I. (Favorite Small Press and Mainstream-Independent) Award.

In 2016, Rathburn was nominated for another S.P.A.M.I.

== Bibliography ==
- JLA #60 (pencils, with writer Mark Waid, and inks by Paul Neary, DC Comics, 1997)
- DC 1st: Superman/Lobo (pencils, with writer Keith Giffen, one-shot, DC, 2002)
- Invincible #7, 28-31, 50, 56, 59, 61-65 (inks, with writer Robert Kirkman and pencils by Ryan Ottley, Image Comics, November 2003, February–April 2006, June 2008, December 2008 - August 2009)
- The Walking Dead #6- (regular colorist/greyscales, with writer Robert Kirkman, Image Comics, March 2004-ongoing)
- Reaper (pencils, inks, & tones, with writer Robert Kirkman, one-shot, Image, 2004)
- Brit: Red White Black and Blue (pencils, with writer Robert Kirkman, inks, & tones, one-shot, Image, 2004)
- Fantastic Four: Foes (pencils, 6-issue limited series, Marvel Comics, 2005)
- Inhumans 2099 #1 (Marvel Knights 2099, Marvel Comics, 2004)
- Brit #1-6 (pencils, inks, & colors, with writer Bruce Brown, Image, 2007)
- War Heroes #1- (with writer Mark Millar and pencils, by Tony Harris, Image, July–September 2008, October 2009-ongoing)
- The Authority #8-9, 11- (inks, with writers Dan Abnett/Andy Lanning, and pencils by Simon Coleby, Wildstorm, May 2009 - ongoing)
- Reaper 2 (creator, writer, illustrator & letterer, one-shot, Image, 2011)
- Super Dinosaur #9- (inks, with writer Robert Kirkman, and pencils by Jason Howard, Image, March 2012 - ongoing)
