= Invincible Presents: Atom Eve =

2023 video game

- Developer: Terrible Posture Games
- Publisher: Skybound Games
- Director: Jill Murray
- Producer: Jessica Woodard
- Artist: Rossi Gifford
- Writers: Jill Murray; Mary Arroz; Stephaine Glover; Michael G. Rogers; Jessica Woodard
- Composer: Milk & Bone
- Series: Invincible
- Engine: Unreal Engine 4
- Platform: Windows
- Release: November 14, 2023
- Genres: Role-playing game, visual novel
- Mode: Single-player

Invincible Presents: Atom Eve is a 2023 video game developed by Terrible Posture Games and published by Skybound Games. Loosely based on Image Comics' Invincible spin-off comic book series of the same name and its animated television series adaptation, the game tells a standalone story starring Atom Eve, as she navigates her double life as a senior year high school student and a superhero. It combines gameplay of role-playing games and visual novels with music and songs provided by Canadian electro-pop duo Milk & Bone. The game was released on November 14, 2023, and received positive reviews.

== Gameplay ==
In Invincible Presents: Atom Eve, players control the titular character, Atom Eve. Eve's powers are customizable using a skill tree and make choices in a branching narrative. Certain dialogue choices can affect the plot and are timed. Players earn experience points when defeating foes and completing quests. Combat is turn-based, and choices players make regarding Eve's powers affect what options they have access to. For example, prioritizing superpowers that make dialogue easier can leave Eve with fewer options in combat. During combat, Eve has awareness of her enemies' next move. Players can counter these attacks by spending energy to perform their own attacks. If Eve has leftover energy, it will be added to her next turn.

== Synopsis ==
In a flashback, Samantha Eve Wilkins / Atom Eve battles against the villain Killcannon and defeats him. She is then asked by fellow superhero Robot to join his group, the Teen Team. Eve returns home and is forced to reveal her superhero identity to her parents. One year later, during a patrol, Eve spots a flying green female alien, though she is forced to deal with Killcannon and could not investigate. The next day, Eve begins her senior year at high school. The Teen Team responds to a robbery committed by the Mauler Twins, where the heroes are assisted by a mysterious pajama-wearing superhero who calls himself Invincible. The next day, at school, Eve encounters fellow student Mark Grayson, who reveals himself to her as Invincible. The two of them befriend one another, as well as Mark's friends William Clockwell and Amber Bennett.

Later, Eve encounters one of the students at her school, Todd, who has a chemical bomb crudely grafted to his chest. Eve can either defuse the bomb in time or prioritize saving nearby citizens, resulting in Todd's death. Regardless of the outcome, Eve proceeds to investigate the origin of the bomb. Her investigation is interrupted by reports of disturbance at the city's power plant. Eve arrives and finds the green alien she encountered earlier, who is siphoning energy from the plant's reactor. The alien, calling herself Universa the Warrior Queen, battles Eve, while claiming that her world is dying and that she needs the energy from Earth to save it. Eve defeats Universa and destroys her staff, knocking her unconscious. Robot arrives and apprehends Universa, though he does not allow Eve to pry further on Universa's story. As Eve's investigation on the bomb continues, she soon discovers that her chemistry teacher, Hiles, was the one who created the bomb, and she was working with the Mauler Twins. Teaming up with Mark, Eve defeats the Twins, then later makes a choice between letting Hiles commit suicide with her own bomb, or stopping her from doing so. Regardless of the outcome, Robot confiscates Hiles' bomb design blueprints, though Eve forces him to promise her a chance to speak to Universa later.

On graduation day, Eve, Mark, William and Amber celebrate going to college, though Eve admits that she did not send in any applications, as the choice did not appeal to her. The group then learns that the Guardians of the Globe, the world's leading superhero team, has been brutally murdered by an unidentified assailant. Eve and Mark attend the Guardians' funeral, but Eve becomes frustrated when her boyfriend, fellow Teen Team member Rex Sloan / Rex Splode, fails to attend. She later finds out that Rex has been cheating on her with another team member, Kate Cha / Dupli-Kate, due to growing jealousy of Eve's friendship with Mark. Heartbroken, Eve breaks up with Rex.

Some time later, Robot informs Eve that he has been selected by the Global Defense Agency to lead a new chapter of the Guardians, which also means the disbanding of the Teen Team. Eve declines Robot's offer to join the new Guardians. Returning home, Eve argues with her parents about her breakup with Rex, then furiously leaves them as she goes to the suburbs, where she creates a tree house to take refuge. The next day, Eve is contacted by Cecil Stedman, director of the GDA, who reveals that Universa wishes to speak with her. However, their conversation is interrupted, as Eve learns Mark is embroiled in a battle against his father, Nolan Grayson / Omni-Man, who was also responsible for killing the original Guardians. Eve attempts to go help Mark, but is stopped by the villain Doc Seismic. Eve deals with Seismic, but then finds that Omni-Man has retreated into space, while Mark has been hospitalized.

Some time after the incident, Eve reunites with William and Amber, the latter of whom has broken up with Mark due to him constantly canceling their dates. As Amber begins to figure out Mark's secret identity, Eve contemplates disclosing her superhero persona to both Amber and William. Eve later goes to a GDA prison facility and meets with Cecil, who lets her into Universa's cell. Universa pleads with Eve to recover her Staff of Leadership, so that she may leave the planet and search for other resources for her people. Eve finds one half of the staff in Killcannon's possession, and the other at the power plant. Eve recovers both pieces and mends them back together.

After visiting a recovering Mark at his home, Eve takes Universa's staff back to the GDA prison, but Universa escapes her cell and takes the staff with her. Eve begins preparation to confront Universa for the final time, while also accepting Robot's offer for assistance. Eve returns to the power plant, where she battles both Killcannon and Universa. Ultimately, Eve can make a choice whether to trust Universa and help her siphon energy from the power plant's reactor, or help the GDA apprehend her. In the aftermath of the battle, depending on past interactions, Eve may rekindle her relationship with Rex, start a new one with Mark, or pursue neither. She returns to her treehouse, hopeful for the future.

== Development ==
Skybound Games released Invincible Presents: Atom Eve for Windows on November 14, 2023, developed by Terrible Posture Games who previously worked with Skybound on The Walking Dead: Last Mile. It was made available for free the same week on Amazon's subscription service Prime Gaming.

== Reception ==
Reception

Aggregate scores
Aggregator	Score
Metacritic	79/100
OpenCritic	70% recommend

Invincible Presents: Atom Eve received generally favorable reviews from critics, according to the review aggregation website Metacritic. RPGFan liked that it could be played without knowledge of the comic book or animated series. They found it a bit short but praised the gameplay, characters, soundtrack, and visuals. Though Shacknews said Atom Eve "sticks to some predictable superhero tropes", they praised the story. They also enjoyed the gameplay and said the role-playing elements helped differentiate it from other visual novels. Sports Illustrated said it is not as good as the animated series but is worth playing.
