= War Heroes (comics) =

Six issue war comic set in an alternative contemporary timeline by Mark Miller

- Cover of War Heroes #1. July 2008 by Tony Harris and J. D. Mettler.

Publication information
- Publisher: Image Comics
- Schedule: Erratic
- Format: Limited series
- Genre: SuperheroWar
- Publication date: August 2008 – present
- No. of issues: 6

Creative team
- Created by: Mark Millar; Tony Harris
- Written by: Mark Millar
- Penciller: Tony Harris
- Inker: Cliff Rathburn
- Letterer: Clem Robins
- Colorist: J. D. Mettler
- Editor: Drew Gill

War Heroes is a six-issue limited series from Image Comics, written by Mark Millar, with art by Tony Harris.

Millar has said "War Heroes is everything I've been leading up to with Civil War, Ultimates, The Authority, Kick-Ass and Wanted" and "This is what my Ultimates 3 would have been if Bryan and I had stuck around."

== Publication history ==
The six-issue limited series started August 2008 but as of March 2024 only three issues have been published.

== Plot ==
Set in an alternate timeline during the coalition wars in Afghanistan and Iraq, the detonation of a nuclear bomb in Washington D.C. prompts the United States administration to expand the coalition war on terror to include Iran, as well as institute martial law in the United States. As American casualties increase, morale and public support decline with the economy, reducing America's standing in the world. Lacking the necessary recruits, the US Military boosts enlistment by distributing pills to its soldiers which confer upon them various superpowers, tipping the scale in the war.

The story focus on a group of disenchanted American con artists, who enlist in the military to steal the pills and sell them to foreign investors at $10 million before planning to desert. Initially, however, the con artists had no knowledge of the identity of their clients that they were to sell to until it was revealed to be the terrorist organization, Al-Qaeda. When one of the con artists' brother (a war hero) is taken prisoner in an attack by a super-powered member of Al-Qaeda, the con artists set about rescuing him from a public execution.

== Reception ==
David Wallace reviewed the first issue for Comics Bulletin and concluded that "this is a solid debut that sets up the book's premise quickly and efficiently, and shows a lot of potential for the future." Richard Renteria at Newsarama agrees saying "Millar deftly sets into motion a series of events that are perfectly captured by Harris’ detailed and eye-catching art."

The first issue had sales estimates of 30,637 putting it at 77th in the sales charts.

== Film ==
In September 2008, it was announced that War Heroes had been optioned by Columbia Pictures, with Michael De Luca as producer and Millar taking an executive producer role. In 2011, Jeff Kirschenbaum bought the film rights from Columbia after they had let it lapse, and he set the film up at Universal Pictures. Thomas Dean Donnelly and Joshua Oppenheimer were considered to write the script.
