= Brit (character) =

Comic book superhero

- Brit #6, art by Cliff Rathburn

Publication information
- Publisher: Image Comics
- First appearance: Brit (July 2003)
- Created by: Robert Kirkman; Tony Moore

In-story information
- Full name: Brittany
- Team affiliations: Global Defence Agency; Guardians of the Globe
- Abilities: Invulnerability; Longevity; Superhuman Stamina

Brit is a superhero appearing in comic books published by Image Comics. He first appeared in Brit (July 2003), and was created by Robert Kirkman and Tony Moore.

Brit's supporting character Donald Ferguson saw his Brit storyline adapted to the second season of the Amazon Prime Video adult animated superhero series Invincible. Brit himself appears from the series' third season onward, voiced by Jonathan Banks.

== Publication history ==
Brit starred in three one-shots: Brit (July 2003), Brit: Cold Death (December 2003), Brit: Red, White, Black and Blue (August 2004). Robert Kirkman wrote the three one-shots with Tony Moore illustrating the first and second issue and with Cliff Rathburn on the third. The one-shots were collected in a trade paperback and were released in March 2007. The character Donald Ferguson made his debut in the first one-shot and Cecil Stedman in the second, both later major characters in Invincible.

In August 2007, Brit was launched as an ongoing, full-color series written by Bruce Brown and features Rathburn's debut as an ongoing series artist. The series was overseen and edited by Kirkman. In the second issue, Andy Kuhn came aboard as the series' breakdown artist. In the seventh issue, Rathburn was replaced by Nate Bellegarde as the new artist. The series expanded Brit's universe by introducing his brother and Sister and also revealed the origin of his powers.

The series was brought to a close with issue #12, because, according to Kirkman, "the book sells a fraction of what Invincible, The Walking Dead and The Astounding Wolf-Man sell. But I could have kept it going. I blame a horrendous shipping schedule for the low sales... something that I must shoulder the bulk of the blame for".

Brit became the first member of the newly reformed Guardians of the Globe in a six-issue mini-series Guarding the Globe, starting in August 2010. He and his supporting characters remained a part of the core cast in the six-issue Vol. 2 follow-up to Guarding the Globe, and the twelve-issue sequel Invincible Universe, continuing to appear in the main Invincible comic until its end.

== Fictional character biography ==
=== Brit: Old Soldier ===
The opening of the first Brit one-shot (later retitled Brit: Old Soldier) showcases elderly American super-soldier Brit defeating Master Mind, who had been controlling a gigantic monster composed of human hostages, although numerous people are killed in the fight. CIA director Steven Erickson is adamant to duplicate Master Mind's power without any harmful side effects, with CIA scientist Dr. Rodgers believing they can safely duplicate his powers as well as Brit's invulnerability. Erickson dismissed Rodgers' theory not wanting to risk losing their last line of defense and believed that in spite of his aged appearance, Brit may be immortal.

Elsewhere, Brit and his girlfriend, Jessica, discuss the future of their relationship. In the middle of sex, Jessica mentioned that her father wanted to meet him and so invited them both for dinner. Brit is then called to protect a group of gifted scientists in opening an interdimensional gateway. After killing the alien that comes out of the portal, Donald Ferguson notices Brit's nose bleeding, which he reports to Erickson, who authorises Brit's capture to attempt to duplicate his invulnerability. Meanwhile, while "squirming" meeting Jessica's parents, Brit is called away to stop a crazed supervillain who has taken over Indonesia. After the fight, Erickson and Rodgers came to pick Brit up; rightfully suspicious of the two being together, he quickly punches them out before leaving to marry Jessica.

=== Brit: Cold Death ===
In Brit: Cold Death, Brit and Jessica are retired in a remote place somewhere in Alaska, where Jessica gives birth to Brit's son, Brittany Jr., with Donald learning Brit's first name to be Brittany. This storyline features the first appearance of Cecil Stedman.

=== Brit: Red, White, Black and Blue ===
In Brit: Red, White, Black and Blue, Brit learns that Donald Ferguson is a cyborg who died while on a mission years ago before the Global Defence Agency was able to rescue parts of his brain and transfer them into a robotic body. Brit then fends off an alien invasion.

=== Guarding the Globe ===
In Guarding the Globe, Brit leads the new incarnation of the Guardians of the Globe.

=== Invincible ===
In Invincible, Brit is among the heroes to side with Robot against Invincible on learning that Invincible had secretly surrendered Earth to the Viltrum empire.

== Supporting cast ==
- Jessica: Brit's wife. Former law student turned stripper at club owned by Brit.
- Brittany, Jr.: Brit's infant son.
- Britney: Brit's younger half-sister
- Cecil Stedman: Head of the clandestine Global Defense Agency.
- Donald Ferguson: Superhuman liaison of the Global Defense Agency, Brit's contact, and android.
- Steven Erickson: Former Deputy Director of the Global Defense Agency and Brit's former boss.
- Slitter: Interim Deputy Director of the Global Defense Agency and Brit's new superior.
- Euclid: Brit's younger brother and nemesis.

== Collected editions ==
The comics have been collected into trade paperback:

- Brit:
  - Volume 1: Old Soldier (collects "Brit", "Brit: Cold Death" and "Brit: Red, White, Black and Blue", 176 pages, March 2007, ISBN 1-58240-678-2)
  - Volume 2: AWOL (collects Brit #1–6, 144 pages, August 2008, ISBN 1-58240-864-5)
  - Volume 3: Fubar (collects Brit #7–12, August 2009, ISBN 1-60706-061-2)

== In other media ==
Brit appears in Invincible, voiced by Jonathan Banks. Additionally, the series' second season adapts Donald Ferguson's storyline of discovering his android nature from Brit.
