= Guarding the Globe =

American comic book series

Publication information
- Publisher: Image Comics
- Schedule: Bimonthly
- Publication date: Aug. 2010 – Oct. 2011 Sept. 2012 – Feb. 2013
- No. of issues: 12 (6 + 6)
- Main character(s): Brit; Guardians of the Globe

Creative team
- Created by: Robert Kirkman
- Written by: Benito Cereno; Phil Hester
- Artists: Ransom Getty; Kris Anka; Todd Nauck

Collected editions
- Under Siege: ISBN 1-60706-356-5
- Hard to Kill: ISBN 1-60706-673-4

Guarding the Globe is an American comic book series published by Image Comics, created by Robert Kirkman, and set in the Image Universe. A spin-off of Invincible and a stand-alone sequel to Brit, following Brit as he forms a new incarnation of the Guardians of the Globe, the title was announced near the end of 2012, with the first volume, Guarding the Globe: Under Siege, written by Benito Cereno (from an outline by Kirkman) and illustrated by Ransom Getty and Kris Anka, running for six issues from August 2010 to October 2011. A second volume followed: Guarding the Globe: Hard to Kill, written by Phil Hester and illustrated by Todd Nauck, and running for six issues from September 2012 to February 2013.

The series has received a generally positive critical reception.

== Plot summary ==
=== Under Siege ===
With Invincible out in space fighting in The Viltrumite War, ageing superhero Brit must recruit a new international roster of the Guardians of the Globe to protect Earth in his absence, the new team coming together just in time to battle "The Order", a new group of supervillains.

=== Hard to Kill ===
As the new Guardians of the Globe return to active duty on different missions all around the world, Brit faces family issues at home, while a singular Mauler returns (one clone having survived prior to the two killed by Oliver Grayson), seeking to spread his genetics across the world.

== Reception ==
Issue #	Publication date	Critic rating	Critic reviews	Ref.	Issue #	Publication date	Critic rating	Critic reviews	Ref.
Under Siege					Hard to Kill				
1	August 2010	5.5/10	1		1	September 2012	7.4/10	11	
2	October 2010	7.5/10	1		2	October 2012	6.6/10	5	
3	January 2011	7.5/10	1		3	November 2012	7.5/10	2	
4	March 2011	6.5/10	1		4	December 2012	7.0/10	3	
5	July 2011	5.5/10	1		5	January 2013	5.0/10	1	
6	October 2011	5.5/10	1		6	February 2013	8.0/10	1	
Overall		6.3/10	6				6.9/10	23	

== Collected editions ==
Title	Material collected	Format	Publication date	ISBN
Volume 1: Under Siege	Guarding the Globe (vol. 1) #1–6	Trade paperback	September 11, 2012	978-1-60706-356-8
Volume 2: Hard to Kill	Guarding the Globe (vol. 2) #1–6	Trade paperback	April 9, 2013	978-1-60706-673-6
Invincible Universe Compendium	Invincible Presents: Atom Eve #1–2; Invincible Presents: Atom Eve & Rex Splode #1–3, Guarding the Globe (vol. 1) #1–6, Guarding the Globe (vol. 2) #1–6, and Invincible Universe #1–12	Trade paperback	June 13, 2023	978-1-5343-9996-9

== In other media ==
In July 2023, during San Diego Comic-Con, it was announced that Skybound Games and Ubisoft would release a mobile game based on the series, entitled Invincible: Guarding the Globe, with a release date yet to be determined.
