= The Astounding Wolf-Man =

Comic book series

- The Astounding Wolf-Man #1 Director's Cut

Publication information
- Publisher: Skybound Entertainment (Image Comics)

Creative team
- Created by: Robert Kirkman; Jason Howard

Collected editions
- Volume 1: ISBN 1-58240-862-9
- Volume 2: ISBN 1-60706-007-8
- Volume 3: ISBN 1-60706-111-2
- Volume 4: ISBN 1-60706-249-6
- Hardcover: ISBN 1-5343-0364-2

The Astounding Wolf-Man is a superhero comic book series launched by American company Image Comics on May 5, 2007. It ran until its final 25th issue in 2010. A spin-off of Robert Kirkman's Invincible, the series was created and written by Kirkman with art by Jason Howard. The first issue of The Astounding Wolf-Man was given away for free as part of Free Comic Book Day. A "director's cut" edition of the first issue was released in the same date as the second issue.

The Astonishing Wolf-Man follows Gary Hampton, a wealthy CEO of a record company who is mauled by a werewolf while on a family vacation and becomes a werewolf himself. The story revolves around Gary's efforts to control his animalistic instincts and use his powers for good and to be a superhero, despite being plagued by a curse.

== Conclusion ==
Robert Kirkman ended The Astounding Wolf-Man in 2010 with the story arc "Legacy". Although Wolf-Man's own series was concluded and all loose ends tied up, Kirkman pointed out that characters from Wolf-Man's universe would still crossover into his other characters' lives as they inhabit the same universe; Wolf-Man himself appeared in the Invincible series several times, notably in a two-part storyline (Invincible Universe #8–9) sent as part of an extraction squad consisting of Popper, Mantis, Best Tiger, and Claire Voyant to capture a Brazilian super-criminal known as Redeye. Wolf-Man is momentarily distracted by the presence of Davi, Redeye's ward, and captured. Weakened due to his injuries and lack of moonlight, Wolf-Man seems to confuse Davi with Chloe. Davi aids Wolf-Man's escape as Best Tiger destroys Redeye's prison. As the prisoners and townspeople, left bloodthirsty following Redeye's depowerment, Wolf-Man, still weak, is unable to stop the riot and becomes separated from Davi. Fearing he has again failed to save a child, Wolf-Man returns to the base unaware that Davi has escaped harm and now possesses Redeye's powers.

== Characters ==
- Gary Hampton aka "Wolf-Man" – The main protagonist of the series; a successful businessman-turned werewolf superhero following an incident that left him with werewolf abilities.
- Rebecca Hampton – Gary's beautiful wife. Killed in Issue #7 by Zechariah; who she struck across the face after expressing her disdain for him; Zechariah, momentarily blinded by rage, fatally bites her neck.
- Chloe Hampton aka "Vampire Girl" – Gary's loving daughter, she is close to both of her parents.
- Dunford – The estate manager, butler and lifelong friend to the Hampton family; formerly a businessman whose company was bought out by Gary during his rise in the business world, Dunford was actually offered a position in Hampton Industries, but chose to retire instead. Following his wife's death, Dunford, who was friends with Gary by then, was invited to stay with his family as their estate manager. Dunford is Gary's closest friend and sees him as a kind and generous man who has only ever wanted to help people. In Issue #22, Dunford is killed by Jacobsen and the werewolves amidst their attack on the Hampton estate.
- Maria – The loyal maid to the Hampton family; she is reluctantly let go following Gary's loss of his company, which forced the family to cut back on luxuries.
- Nathan Singleton – A corporate CEO and head of Singleton Enterprises, Hampton Industries' greatest rival. Singleton was a rival of Gary for years and later had an affair with Rebecca, gaining information from her about Gary's company that almost ruined him. Despite appearing to have taken advantage of her for information, Singleton's love for Rebecca is genuine.
- Zechariah – A vampire who approached Gary immediately following his discovery of his abilities; Zechariah posed as a friend and mentor to Gary in his early days as Wolf-Man; teaching him all he knew about werewolves and how to control his abilities, as well as establishing his Wolf-Man identity. Gary's trust in Zechariah crumbles when he realizes how much Zechariah is keeping from him. When Zechariah tries to find and reconcile with Gary; he instead encounters Rebecca. A confrontation leads Zechariah to kill Gary's wife in a moment of rage. Zechariah escapes with Mecha-Maid and kidnaps Chloe, transforming her into a vampire. Zechariah is ultimately killed when the Elder tears out his heart.
- The Actioneers – A team of superheroes who are killed and revived as vampires by Zechariah to serve him; despite retaining their memories, their instinctive loyalty to Zechariah is overpowering, causing them to follow him completely. The team is captured following their attack on Stronghold Prison and kept in isolation inside GDA HQ beneath the Pentagon. Following Zechariah's death, the team are restored to their human forms.
- Pamela aka "Mecha-Maid" – A robotic member of the Actioneers who was kept captive by Zechariah and the Actioneers following their transformations. Mecha-Maid later escapes and joins the expanded Guardians of the Globe.
- Elise – The artificially created "daughter" of Mecha-Maid; initially just a hologram, she is later given a robotic body to live independently.
- Agent Hunter – An agent of the Global Defense Agency who is able to regenerate from any wound, even fatal wounds such as decapitation. Hunter is placed in charge of the Wolf-Man investigation and relentlessly tracks Gary down to arrest him, believing that he murdered Rebecca. Hunter later finds that he had been mistaken about Gary all along and is ordered by Cecil Stedman to let go of his investigation. Hunter goes on to join the expanded Guardians of the Globe.
- Director Cecil Stedman – The leader of the Global Defense Agency. He becomes Gary's strongest ally following Rebecca's death, working tirelessly to aid him and later exonerate him for Zechariah's crime. Stedman later recruits Gary to the expanded Guardians of the Globe, and later gives his blessing to Gary's formation of his own team—the Wolf Corps. Stedman is a supporting character in the Invincible series; where his history and position are further explored.
- "The Face" – A powerful criminal with two faces and a third laser-blasting eye. He is a former member of a defunct criminal organisation known as the Body.
- Agent Donald Ferguson – An agent of the Global Defense Agency; who is also a robot, and later joins the expanded Guardians of the Globe. He becomes a friend to Gary and Chloe following Gary's exoneration.
- "The Elder" – An elder brood werewolf and leader of all werewolves. He was responsible for attacking and giving Gary his werewolf powers. In the final issue, the Elder confronts Gary for battle to test his worth—explaining he had chosen Gary to succeed him as Elder of the werewolves so they may be redeemed and become great once again. Gary successfully kills the Elder, taking his position.
- Jacobsen – An influential werewolf under the Elder's command. Jacobsen first meets Gary while seeking to kill Zechariah to avenge his murder of one of his children. When Gary apparently does so, Jacobsen immediately declares himself an ally. Much later, Jacobsen and the werewolves return to attack the Hampton estate, declaring that Gary has been marked for death by the Elder. After Gary kills the Elder and takes his position, he forgives Jacobsen for his actions under the Elder's command.
- "Gray Wolf" – A werewolf, whose real name is unknown, who is employed as an agent of the Global Defense Agency. He originally attacks Gary, pretending to work for the Elder, but secretly gives him a communicator at Stedman's behest. Following Gary's defeat of Gorgg, exoneration and return as a superhero, Gray Wolf joins the expanded Guardians of the Globe. After a mission to shut down Impact's former employer, Gray Wolf reveals that he was the gardener who Gary, in his first night as a werewolf, apparently killed during his first night as a werewolf. Gray Wolf had had terminal cancer, which was cured after Gary's attack transformed him into a werewolf. Gray Wolf, a retired CIA agent, went on to work with the GDA, leaving him happier than he has ever been.

== Collected editions ==
The series is being collected into trade paperbacks:

- Volume 1 (collects The Astounding Wolf-Man #1–7, 180 pages, January 2008, ISBN 1-58240-862-9)
- Volume 2 (collects The Astounding Wolf-Man #8–12 and Invincible #57, 160 pages, April 2009, ISBN 1-60706-007-8)
- Volume 3 (collects The Astounding Wolf-Man #13–18, 166 pages, February 2010, ISBN 1-60706-111-2)
- Volume 4 (collects The Astounding Wolf-Man #19–25, 160 pages, January 2011, ISBN 1-60706-249-6)
- Astounding Wolf-Man Complete Collection hardcover (collects The Astounding Wolf-Man #1–25 and Invincible #57, July 2017, ISBN 1-5343-0364-2
