= Invincible (comics) =

Comic book series

- Variant cover of Invincible 75 (November 2010), art by Ryan Ottley

Publication information
- Publisher: Skybound Entertainment (Image Comics)
- Schedule: Monthly
- Format: Ongoing series
- Genre: Superhero
- Publication date: January 2003 – February 2018
- No. of issues: 144 (25 volumes)
- Main characters: Mark Grayson / Invincible; Nolan Grayson / Omni-Man; Samantha Eve Wilkins / Atom Eve; Debbie Grayson; Oliver Grayson / Kid Omni-Man; Rudy Conners / Robot; Cecil Stedman; Rex Sloan / Rex Splode; Allen the Alien; Thragg

Creative team
- Created by: Robert Kirkman
- Written by: Robert Kirkman
- Artist(s): Cory Walker; Ryan Ottley
- Letterer: Russ Wooton
- Colorist: Bill Crabtree
- Editor: Robert Kirkman

Invincible is an American comic book series written by Robert Kirkman, illustrated by Cory Walker and Ryan Ottley, and published by Image Comics. Set in the Image Universe, Invincible follows the coming of age of superhero Mark Grayson / Invincible, a half-Viltrumite and first-born son of Omni-Man, the most powerful superhero on Earth.

The series began publication on January 22, 2003, before concluding on February 14, 2018, spanning 144 issues. Several spin-off series were released over its run: Brit, The Pact, Invincible Presents: Atom Eve & Rex Splode, and Guarding the Globe. An animated television adaptation began streaming on Amazon Prime Video on March 25, 2021, while an additional spin-off, Invincible Universe: Battle Beast, began publication in 2025.

== Plot ==
Mark Grayson is the son of Nolan (Omni-Man), an alien from Viltrum and Earth's most powerful superhero, and Debbie Grayson. At seventeen, Mark develops powers and fights crime as "Invincible." He befriends the Teen Team—Robot, Rex Splode, Dupli-Kate, and Atom Eve—and meets Allen the Alien, an agent of the Coalition of Planets, which protects planets from threats.

Nolan Grayson ambushes and kills the Guardians of the Globe. When Nolan (Omni-Man) is exposed, he reveals himself as a conqueror, destroying cities and murdering thousands. Mark believes Nolan is being controlled until the Mauler Twins revive the team's leader, the Immortal. The Immortal attacks Nolan, who kills him again—but Mark witnesses it. Nolan tells Mark he was sent to conquer Earth for the Viltrumite Empire and tries to persuade him to join. Mark refuses, and they fight. Mark is beaten nearly to death, but having changed by the people of Earth and Mark's love, Nolan leaves, unable to kill his son.

After recovering, Mark meets Cecil Stedman, director of the Global Defense Agency, and begins working for the GDA. At Cecil's direction, Robot assembles a new Guardians of the Globe team, bringing together the Teen Team, new heroes such as Monster Girl, and the revived Immortal.

While the New Guardians protect Earth from various threats, three Viltrumites nearly kill Allen in space, but he grows stronger as he heals thanks to a Unopan breeding program meant to create someone capable of defeating a Viltrumite. A Thraxan asks Mark for help, leading to an unexpected reunion with Nolan. Nolan reveals he fathered a child with Andressa, a Thraxan, and needs Mark’s help to save Thraxa from Viltrumites sent to punish him for abandoning Earth. They attack and capture Nolan, while General Kregg appoints Mark Earth's subjugator. Mark returns home with the child, whom Debbie names Oliver.

Meanwhile, Angstrom Levy, a scientist who can create multiversal portals, tries to merge the intellects of his alternate selves to gain vast knowledge. Mark intervenes, accidentally causing the deaths of Levy's counterparts and leaving Levy disfigured. Because his counterparts share a hatred of Invincible—who, in many other dimensions, turned against humanity and joined his father—Angstrom vows revenge on Mark. Angstrom returns and sends Mark through multiple universes to weaken him, severely injuring Debbie in the process. Enraged, Mark apparently beats Angstrom to death, then feels remorse. Stranded in an alternate dimension, a future version of the Guardians rescues him.

Because of his Thraxan DNA, Oliver becomes a preteen within weeks and develops Viltrumite powers. Allen visits Earth to recruit Mark and Nolan into the Coalition, but learns Nolan is imprisoned. Mark gives Allen Nolan's books, hoping they could reveal weapons that can kill Viltrumites. Allen thanks him and leaves to find Nolan. Anissa arrives to assess Mark, warning that a more ruthless Viltrumite will come and Earth will suffer if he defies the Viltrum Empire. Afterward, she encounters Allen, who allows himself to be captured to reach Nolan aboard a Viltrumite prison ship.

Sentenced to death, Nolan joins the Coalition at Allen’s urging. With Battle Beast’s help, they escape prison, kill two Viltrumite guards and most security forces, but Battle Beast disappears amid the chaos. Nolan tells Allen fewer than fifty pure-blooded Viltrumites remain and that their enemies created the Scourge Virus centuries ago, killing over 99% of the Viltrum population. At the Coalition homeworld, Talescria, Allen introduces Nolan to Thaedus, who sends them to find weapons against the empire. Thaedus reveals a new virus strain that could wipe out all Viltrumites if necessary; Nolan urges him to reserve it as a last resort.

Angstrom Levy survived his fight with Mark thanks to a race of technological beings called the Technicians, and attacks Earth with twenty evil alternate versions of "Invincible". While Mark helps clean up after the attack, the Viltrumite Conquest arrives to inspect Mark's takeover. Defying his mission parameters, Conquest attacks Mark. He severely injures Oliver and nearly kills Eve when they try to help Mark. After a final stand, Mark eventually defeats the Viltrumite. As Mark recovers, Cecil secretly keeps Conquest's body, intending to interrogate him about the Viltrum Empire and how to stop them. While Mark encounters eco-terrorist Dinosaurus, Conquest escapes Cecil's detention center. Back with the empire, Grand Regent Thragg orders Conquest to kill Mark, Nolan, and Oliver.

Nolan and Allen recruit Mark, Oliver, and Tech Jacket to fight the Viltrumites, but Conquest, Lucan, and Randee ambush them on the way to the Coalition. Mark kills Conquest but is gravely wounded. For 10 months, Nolan and Oliver secretly train and watch over Mark on an alien planet, growing closer, while Allen and Tech Jacket support the Coalition on Talescria. Recovered, Mark joins them to defend Talescria. The Viltrumites retreat, and the group pursues them to Viltrum. Mark, Nolan, Thaedus, and Space Racer destroy the planet, killing several Viltrumites. Thragg kills Thaedus and gravely wounds Mark, Nolan, and Oliver, but spares them. After they recover, the Coalition fears a Viltrumite attack on Earth. Mark, Nolan, and Tech Jacket return to find Earth intact, but Thragg intercepts them. He demands that the remaining 37 Viltrumites be allowed to reproduce with Earth's population, or he threatens all life. To protect Earth, Mark agrees to a truce.

Mark learns that Eve was pregnant, but she had an abortion while he was away, and he doesn’t blame her. He battles Dinosaurus in Las Vegas, where Dinosaurus detonates bombs that destroy the city, killing thousands and apparently himself. Captured by the GDA, Dinosaurus survives. At the ruins, Cecil explains the bomb-created glass will harness solar energy for millions. Mark sees that Dinosaurus's abhorrent methods can yield positive results. He frees Dinosaurus from the Pentagon, and they join forces to help the planet; Cecil declares them enemies.

On Talescria, Allen warns Nolan that a new Scourge Virus could kill Viltrumites and Earth’s humans. Nolan believes Earth can change them, as it changed him. They fight until Oliver intervenes and joins Allen. Imprisoned, Nolan stays behind as Allen and Oliver head to Earth. Mark meets them in space and rejects their dangerous plan, sparking a fight. Thragg arrives to help Mark. Though Thragg and Allen seek peace, the Guardians still consider Mark Earth’s enemy. As fighting resumes, Oliver releases the virus, infecting Mark.

Mark is critically injured, so Thragg has Viltrumite scientists heal him to prevent a Coalition attack. Dinosaurus joins the warship to help Mark recover. Thragg discovers Mark is Argall’s grandson, making Mark, Oliver, and Nolan heirs to the Viltrum Empire. He tries to kill Mark, but Dinosaurus saves him. Mark recovers from the virus but loses his powers.

The Flaxans attack Earth, revealing Robot and Monster Girl overthrew their dictatorship and ruled their dimension. Political conflict later split them as Robot grew ruthless to improve his subjects’ lives. The attack is stopped, but to Thragg's chagrin, General Kregg saves several people, including his partner. All Viltrumites except Thragg and Anissa have taken human partners and begun to value companionship.

Mark regains his powers and works with Dinosaurus to help Earth. Dinosaurus admits planting bombs in Greenland to cause severe flooding and bring water to barren regions. The blasts destroy Greenland, and floods kill over a million people. Robot builds a moon-sized base to create an artificial tide and restore water levels. Fearing he may become destructive again, Dinosaurus lets Mark kill him. Eve tells Mark she’s pregnant and wants to make their relationship work.

Thragg attacks Nolan and reveals his heritage. Kregg, Anissa, Lucan, and Thula rescue him, pledging loyalty to Viltrum’s rightful heir. Though they nearly kill Thragg, Nolan spares him. Crowned emperor, Nolan exiles Thragg.

Angstrom sends Mark to a wasteland universe where alternate Marks have turned to cannibalism. Mark and “Mohawk Mark” battle "Sinister Mark." Meanwhile, Eve urges Angstrom to stop fighting Mark, saying he could have done good instead of trying to kill him. Mark and Mohawk return, but Mohawk takes Angstrom to his dimension. Mark and Robot follow; Robot betrays Mark, kills Angstrom and Mohawk, and strands Mark there.

Mark enlists the universe's Robot to get home. Six months later, he returns, but Eve says Robot told everyone he was dead. She ends their relationship, unwilling to raise their child uncertain whether Mark would survive. As Mark leaves, Anissa rapes him after he refuses to mate with her. He asks Cecil about Robot, but Robot arrives, kills Cecil, and takes Mark home. Robot severely injures Eve, forcing Mark to flee with her to a Viltrumite warship. Robot’s drones kill dozens of heroes and villains. Eve gives birth to Terra, and she and Mark reconcile. Robot tells the Viltrumites he plans to make Earth a utopia. Nolan considers this worthwhile but fears fighting Robot would cost too many Viltrumite lives, so he keeps them neutral.

Battle Beast tracks Thragg to Thraxa, where he’s creating a hybrid army by mating with every female Thraxan. After days of fighting, Thragg tears out Battle Beast’s heart but is severely injured. Meanwhile, Mark recognizes the good Robot's utopia has done, but surviving heroes—including Immortal, Dupli-Kate, and Monster Girl—seek revenge for his murders. Fearing Robot will intervene and cause further harm, Mark, Eve, and Terra leave. Allen settles them on Talescria, where a young-adult-looking Oliver helps them adapt to life and parenthood.

Mark finds an alien cave that sends him back to when he gained his powers. He saves millions by changing the past, but risks erasing his relationship with Eve and Terra’s birth. Back in the present, five years have passed. He tells Nolan and Eve that Anissa raped him but asks them to spare her, believing the Viltrumites have changed.

While Mark is away, Thragg’s army conquers planets under twins Onaan and Ursaal. Allen sends Oliver to infiltrate and sabotage them. Thragg orders Oliver aside before he and the twins attack Mark, Eve, and Terra, but Oliver intervenes. Terra awakens her powers, and Thragg fatally impales Oliver. Mark and Eve defeat the twins, with Mark decapitating Onaan. Thragg tears Mark in half as Ursaal nearly beats Eve to death. He stops her, vowing to mourn Onaan and force Terra to watch her parents die. Eve's near-death powers heal her and Mark, but not Oliver.

The Coalition holds Oliver’s funeral, where Mark and Allen discuss his role. Allen apologizes for endangering him, and Mark praises Allen’s leadership. Mark persuades Nolan to recruit the Viltrumites and tells him about Anissa's assault. Ursaal begins questioning Thragg’s care for her and their children.

Mark, Eve, Nolan’s loyal Viltrumites, and the Coalition drive the Thraxan-Viltrumite army from their territories and confront it near the Sun. Several of Thragg's children and Nolan's Viltrumites die, including Anissa. Nolan mortally wounds himself fighting Thragg. Mark exposes Thragg’s disregard for his children, prompting Ursaal to order her siblings to surrender. The Coalition detains them. Seeing the threat Thragg poses to humanity and the universe, Robot sends Mark an armored suit. Too weak to punch Thragg, Mark bites through his jugular and severs his throat. Thragg kicks him away, but Allen rescues Mark. Thragg bleeds out in the Sun’s solar flare, which incinerates him.

As Mark recovers, Nolan tells him he is dying and names him the Viltrumites’ new Emperor. Saying Mark has changed him and can lead the empire into a new era, Nolan asks him to "change them" before dying. Mark, Eve, Terra, Debbie, and Allen mourn him.

As emperor, Mark ends Robot's rule on Earth but spares him, reducing him to a brain. He appoints Immortal to lead the GDA, trusting him to improve the world peacefully, and allows Robot to advise him. Robot agrees. Eve tells Mark that Anissa left him a son, Markus “Marky,” conceived through her rape of Mark. When Marky develops powers, Mark decides the Viltrumites must leave Earth before their influence grows too strong. Everyone leaves except Mark, Marky, and Mark’s half-sister.

Five hundred years later, Mark and Eve have led the Viltrum Empire into a peaceful era, helping other planets. Marky has accepted his conception, and his relationship with Mark has improved. The Coalition has disbanded, and Mark and Eve live in a retirement home, amused that it all began when Nolan asked what Mark would have after 500 years.

== Publication history ==
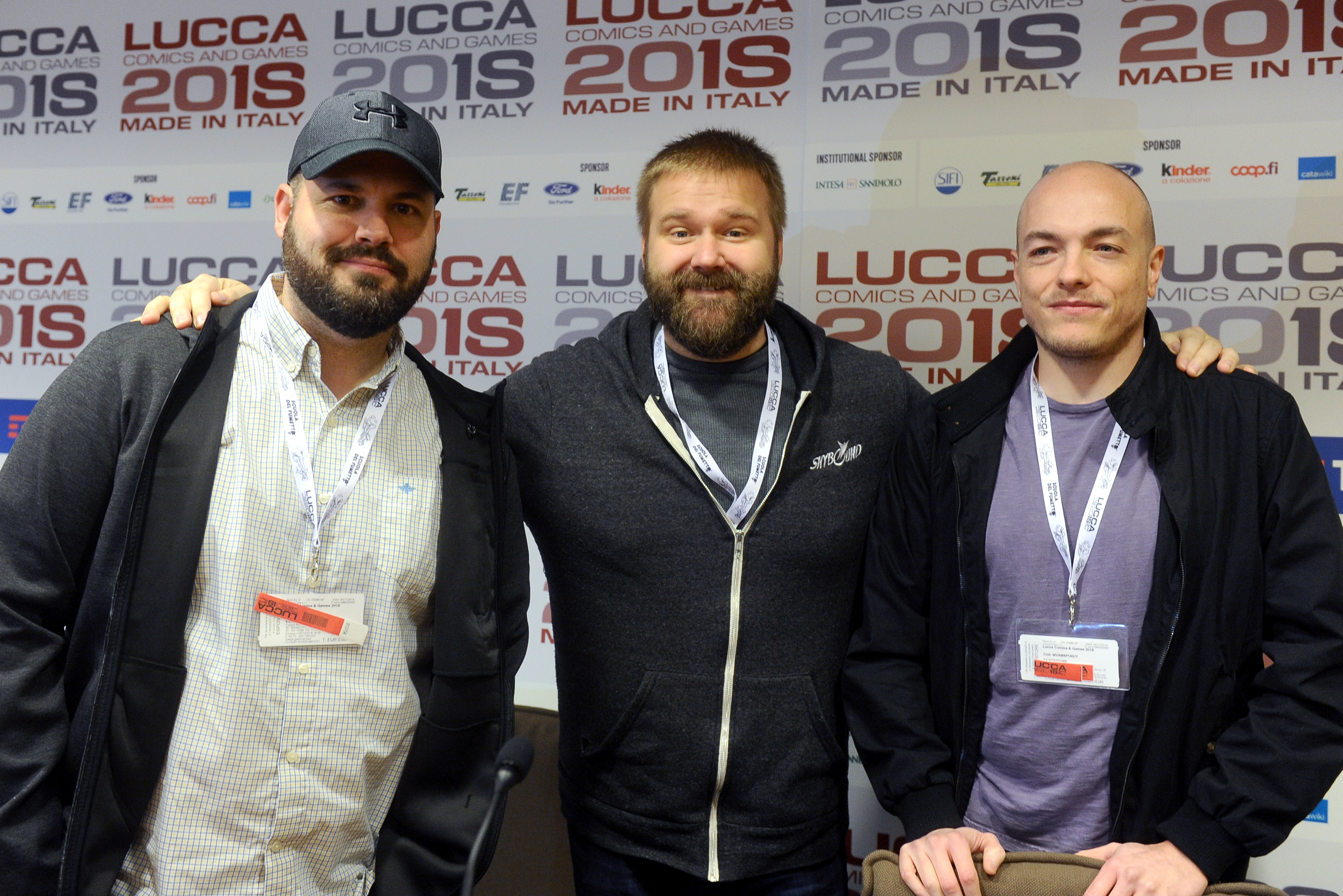
Ryan Ottley, Robert Kirkman, and Cory Walker at Lucca Comics & Games 2018.

Robert Kirkman is the sole writer of the series. Cory Walker co-created the book, designed several characters, and provided art from #1 to #7. Ryan Ottley assumed art duties with issue #8 and drew most future issues, with Walker returning for a select few. Kirkman has provided back-up space for a few aspiring comic creators, most notably Benito Cereno and Nate Bellegarde. The series is known for its extreme graphic violence despite its colorful nature and visuals.

The series ended on February 8, 2018 with issue #144, with Walker returning as artist. The double-sized final issue was released on February 14, 2018. In April 2022, it was announced that a Battle Beast story would be published in Skybound X #25, with Kirkman and Ottley reuniting for the story; it was published on July 20, 2022. In October 2022, it was announced that, in celebration of the series's 20th anniversary in 2023, its first issue would be getting a reprinted facsimile edition reprint and a deluxe edition reprint, compendiums 1-3 would be getting comic shop exclusive hardcover versions, and there would be a reprint of the series in a new 6"x9" graphic novel format with new covers from Cory Walker and Dave McCaig, an Invincible Universe compendium, and a secret announcement in January 2023 (which was later revealed to be a teaser for season two of the animated show).

In December 2024, it was announced that Kirkman and Ottley were developing a prequel series entitled Invincible Universe: Battle Beast. The series, set between issues 19 and 55 of the original Invincible series, follows Battle Beast as he embarks on a quest to find an opponent strong enough to kill him. The first issue of the series debuted on May 14, 2025 and ran for 12 issues, with the 12th releasing on August 19,2026 .

Several of Kirkman's superheroes. Cover art by Ryan Ottley

In 2003 and 2004, Image and Robert Kirkman published several other superhero series: Tech Jacket pencilled in a manga style by E. J. Su (cancelled at #6), the 3-issue Capes Inc. series drawn by Mark Englert and three oneshots starring Brit, the first two with artwork from Tony Moore and the third with artwork by Cliff Rathburn.

In 2007, Brit was launched as an ongoing full-color series written by Bruce Brown, with artwork by Cliff Rathburn. The series was overseen and edited by Robert Kirkman. In late 2007, a two issue mini-series starring Atom Eve was released.

Tech Jacket was first collected as a digest-sized, black and white graphic novel and later reissued in regular sized, full color and a cover scheme similar to Kirkman's other trade paper backs. Capes was collected as a trade paperback in summer 2007, and the three Brit one-shots were colored by Val Staples and published as a collection in 2007, as well.

At first shown to barely coexist in the same universe, the characters have since been integrated into Invincible's book. Tech Jacket was an ongoing series that tied into Invincible #27, and the character has been seen in the background of various battles during the series. The characters from Capes have also been supporting characters seen mainly in large superhero battles Invincible participates in, and the series ran as a back-up in the Invincible book starting with #27. Brit has had an even less substantial role, appearing a couple of times in the aforementioned brawls (understandable considering that after the last book Brit was somewhat-retired). Brit later went on to become the leader of the Guardians of the Globe and was featured heavily in comic spin-offs Guarding the Globe and Invincible Universe. In The Astounding Wolf-Man, Art, Invincible's tailor, appeared, designing the title character's costume. Wolf-man has also appeared in Invincible #48 & 49.

== Characters ==
=== Grayson family ===
- Mark Grayson / Invincible: A superhero and the titular main protagonist of the series. Mark is a 17-year-old high school student and a Viltrumite/human hybrid, who is the son of most powerful superhero, Nolan Grayson / Omni-Man, a male Vitrumite from the planet called Viltrum, and human mother, Debbie Grayson. Mark inherited his powers from his father such as superhuman strength, speed, agility, reflexes, nigh-invulnerability, longevity, and flight, and soon became the superhero, "Invincible" as he strived to use his powers to fight evil.
- Nolan Grayson / Omni-Man: Mark's father, Debbie's husband, and formerly the most powerful and greatest superhero of Earth known as "Omni-Man". He was originally sent by the Viltrumites to prepare the Earth to be conquered by them, but has a change of heart and begins showing compassion for others after nearly killing Mark once his secret is revealed. He works together with Mark, Allen, and his second son Oliver to combat the upcoming threat of the Viltrumites before he is crowned their new emperor when it's revealed he was the descendant of Emperor Argall.
- Debbie Grayson: Mark's mother, Nolan's wife, and stepmother of Oliver Grayson.
- Oliver Grayson: Mark's alien half-brother. The result of a relationship between Nolan and a member of the Thraxans named Andressa, who have short life spans, growing at a rapidly increased rate compared to humans, though his father's DNA is slowing his aging over time. Although his mother is an insectoid, he resembles a Viltrumite/human with purple skin (later fades to pink). Andressa tells Mark to take Oliver to Earth, so that he can have a life with the people there, because their lifespan is longer than her people's and he gets adopted by Debbie. He first takes the sobriquet of Kid Omni-Man and then Young Omni-Man as he attempts to rehabilitate the memory of Omni-Man in the general public. Oliver was later killed by Thragg while protecting Terra Grayson.
- Samantha Eve Wilkins / Atom Eve: A former classmate of Mark's and member of the Teen Team. Eve was created as a result of a government experiment to create a human super-weapon for the military. She was born with an extensive knowledge of biological and chemical sciences, and can manipulate all matter on a molecular level, although a neural mental block was implanted while she was a fetus that stops her from manipulating living animals and other beings. In the event of a severe enough or near-fatal trauma, Eve is able to break her mental block and her powers are bolstered to nigh-omnipotent levels for a few seconds. Her biological mother, Polly, died giving birth to her, and her scientist creator, Elias Brandyworth, was killed by the government agent Steven Erickson. Eve currently lives with her foster parents, including her abusive foster father Adam Wilkins, and her foster mother Elizabeth. Eventually, Eve and Mark realize their true feelings for each other and the pair start dating, fall in love, and get married after Eve gives birth to their daughter Terra.
- Terra Grayson: The daughter of Mark Grayson and Atom Eve who would go on to become the second Invincible.
- Markus "Marky" Murphy: Terra's half-brother. Also known as Marky, he is the son of Mark and Anissa after the latter raped the former. He would go on to become Kid Invincible.
- Lord Argall: The former emperor of the Viltrumites and the great ancestor of Omni-Man, Invincible and Oliver Grayson. He was revealed to have been killed by Thaedus which plunged Viltrum into a civil war.

=== Superheroes ===
- Allen the Alien: Previously a Champion Evaluation Officer who worked for the Coalition of Planets, he tested the skills of various powered heroes on each planet in order to determine if there was a suitable "champion" who could defeat a Viltrumite. He was born in a breeding program after his race was almost eradicated by the Viltrumites. He was bred to hopefully be able to defeat a Viltrumite and was the only successful child born of the program. He was later promoted to leader of the Coalition of Planets after the death of Thaedus by Thragg during their failed sneak attack on Viltrum and led the Coalition of Planets in the war against Thragg and his Thraxan/Viltrum hybrid army.
- The Guardians of the Globe: A superhero team. The original incarnation was brutally murdered by Omni-Man. A second incarnation was formed led by Robot until he went off to fight the Flaxans and then a third incarnation was formed that lasted until Robot's coup.
  - The Immortal: The leader of the Guardians of the Globe and currently married to Dupli-Kate. He can resurrect himself as long as most of his body parts are near each other. He was a Celtic warrior who got exposed to a radioactive meteor that gave him his powers. Throughout the ages, he was a knight, a conquistador, an American Revolutionary, and Abraham Lincoln. In the present storyline, he is alive and was briefly beheaded by Omni-Man during his massacre of the Guardians of the Globe. The Mauler Twins dug up his body and reattached his head causing Immortal to live again. Revealed to rule the world as a mad tyrant in the far future, he is killed by a time-travelling Invincible at Immortal's behest, and his body parts are separated and buried far away from each other to prevent him from resurrecting.
  - Darkwing: A powerless member of the original Guardians of the Globe who is an homage to Batman. Killed by Omni-Man who impales him.
  - War Woman: Holly is a member of the original Guardians of the Globe with superhuman strength who is an homage to Wonder Woman. Killed by Omni-Man who snaps her neck.
  - Aquarus: A fish-like member of the original Guardians of the Globe from Atlantis (and also its king) with aquakinesis who was an homage to Aquaman. Killed by Omni-Man when he smashed his face into Red Rush. Later replaced by another Atlantean who also takes the name Aquarus, although the second Aquarus does not participate in events on dry land, become a superhero, nor join the Guardians.
  - Red Rush: Josef is a member of the original Guardians of the Globe with superhuman speed who was an homage to the Flash. Killed by Omni-Man when he smashed his face into Aquarus.
  - Green Ghost: A ghost-themed member of the original Guardians of the Globe who was a parody of Green Lantern. Beheaded by Omni-Man.
  - Martian Man: A shapeshifting member of the original Guardians of the Globe from Mars who is an homage to Martian Manhunter. Killed by Omni-Man who disembowels him.
  - Black Samson: Markus Grimshaw is an original member of the Guardians of the Globe with super-strength. Lost his powers (and with them, his Guardian status) for a while and wore a high-tech armor made by Art Rosenbaum before recovering them very abruptly. When Robot goes rogue and starts conquering the world, Samson is among the superheroes killed.
  - Robot: Former leader of the Teen Team and Guardians of the Globe. At first masquerading as an actual robot, Rudolph "Rudy" Connors is in fact a malformed human living in a life-support tank, using drone automatons to interact with the world. He eventually clones a body from Rex's DNA to draw the attraction of fellow hero Monster Girl, and takes the new civilian name Rex Connors as well later on. He continues using his drones to work remotely (though he creates several he can be physically present within), and trains his mind to be able to split his concentration across several simultaneous activities or conversations without faltering. After spending hundreds of years in the time-dilated Flaxan dimension alongside Monster Girl, he becomes an antagonist who takes over the world, believing it to be the best path forward.
  - Rex Splode: Rex Sloan is a former member of the Teen Team and the Guardians of the Globe who can make objects explode by charging them with kinetic energy, an ability he received as a child from black-ops government experiments. Initially used as an assassin, he ran away after meeting Atom Eve. He became Atom Eve's first boyfriend until cheating on her with multiple versions of Dupli-Kate, whom he then dated until she cheated on him with The Immortal and multiple duplicates of herself. He lost his hand and was shot in the head while fighting the Lizard League. After recovering, he matures emotionally and later sacrifices himself to kill a hostile alternate-dimension Invincible by charging his own skeleton to explode.
  - Dupli-Kate: Kate Cha is a former member of the Teen Team and the Guardians of the Globe who can create an army of duplicates of herself. She eventually marries The Immortal and has children with him.
  - Bulletproof: Zandale Randolph is a superhero with abilities similar to Invincible, but nowhere near as powerful. Bulletproof gains membership to both the second and third iterations of the Guardians of the Globe, where he remains until the team was dissolved following Robot's coup. On a related note, Bulletproof was one of the proposed names for the title character before the series saw print. Bulletproof later becomes the second Invincible to fill in for Mark when the latter temporarily loses his powers, but continues to use Invincible's costume design even after Mark recovers. He eventually betrays the Guardians to side with Robot when the latter takes over the world, and suffers facial scarring when Immortal activates a bomb hidden inside himself to stage a prison break.
  - Shrinking Ray: Former member of the Guardians of the Globe who had the ability to shrink his body. He was consumed by Komodo Dragon of the Lizard League. In the animated adaptation, she is a woman named Shrinking Rae and barely survived Komodo Dragon consuming her. She briefly retired from superheroics afterwards and dated Rex up until his death, becoming Shrinking Rae again to try aiding her friends.
  - Monster Girl: Amanda is a girl who was cursed by a gypsy, able to shapeshift into a large ogre-like creature with superhuman strength and invulnerability. Each change into monster form causes her normal self to become physically younger, until her boyfriend, Robot, figures out a solution that halts those side-effects of the curse and allows her to develop normally. She follows Robot through a portal to fight the Flaxans, where they both become trapped for nearly a millennium of subjective time in the Flaxan dimension before returning to their home dimension only a year after departure (Amanda with a body that has aged by 12 years). She rebels against Robot when she finds out he tried to have her son, whom she had not previously been aware of, executed.
  - Shapesmith: Formerly Oscar Triance A Martian disguised as human astronaut Rus Livingston who uses his metamorphic powers to change his shape. Believing himself to be a freedom fighter on Mars, he inadvertently causes the takeover of Mars by the Sequids. He is later killed by Robot, whom he had always considered a friend.
  - Darkwing: Formerly Night Boy, the original Darkwing's sidekick, Benjamin Taylor continued Darkwing's legacy in Midnight City where he snapped and started killing criminals until Invincible apprehended him. A reformed Darkwing joins the Guardians of the Globe. He can teleport himself and others via the Shadow-verse using any shadow large enough to envelop him. During the battle with extra-dimensional Invincibles, he drags one into the Shadow-verse and gets trapped there for decades until he eventually escapes in the series finale.
- Fightmaster and Drop Kick: Two time-traveling martial arts masters who were dispatched to find items in the past that could be used to kill their mad tyrant king, The Immortal, who it turns out had been secretly trying to orchestrate his own assassination. Fightmaster and Drop Kick eventually take Invincible into the future to kill The Immortal.

=== Allies ===
- Amber Justine Bennett: Mark's first girlfriend whom he started dating in high school. The two break up after realizing how much Mark's superhero life is interfering with their relationship, but remain on good terms. Mark later finds out that her new boyfriend has been beating her and decides to teach him a lesson. He makes the man promise to stop by dangling him from a rooftop. Amber is seen some years later in a happy relationship with a different man.
- William Francis Clockwell: Mark's roommate and best friend. He initially dates Eve, though Eve admitted she only did it to get close to Mark. He helps Mark in freeing their friend Rick Sheridan after the latter was turned into a Reanimen by D.A. Sinclair. He eventually realizes he is gay and ends up in a committed relationship with Rick.
- Global Defense Agency: A secret government organization run out of the Pentagon that tries to stop threats to the Earth and operates multiple superhero teams including the Guardians of the Globe.
  - Cecil Stedman: Government liaison and head of the clandestine Global Defense Agency. Cecil has a mercurial relationship with Mark and Eve as he prioritizes Earth's safety over all else and will go to questionable or dubious ends in order to make sure that happens. Mark works for Cecil after Omni-Man abandons Earth, but quits after discovering Cecil has hired on some of the villains Mark had defeated and thought were being punished to work at the GDA to create new technology and means of protecting the Earth. Mark eventually comes under his employment again to atone for his working with Dinosaurus which led to disastrous results. Cecil is later killed by Robot after Mark warns him of Robot's true intentions about world domination.
  - Donald Ferguson: Cecil's assistant, the Guardians of the Globe contact, and an android.
  - Damien Darkblood: A demon detective.
  - Ms. Popper: A GDA agent with teleportation and dimensional travel abilities.
- Art Rosenbaum: A tailor of superhero costumes and family friend of the Graysons.
- Rick Sheridan: Mark and William's classmate at Upstate University who was turned into one of the Reanimen. After he recovers from the ordeal, he begins dating William. It is also revealed that he is the only one that had recovered from being turned into a Reanimen.
- B. N. Winslow: Mark and William's principal at Reginald Vel Johnson High School who later becomes the dean at Upstate College.
- Andressa: A member of the insectoid Thraxan who is the second wife of Omni-Man and the mother of Oliver, Mark's half-brother.
- Coalition of Planets: A group of alien civilizations who came together to prevent the Viltrumites from taking over the universe.
  - Thaedus: A Viltrumite opposed to conquering, founder of the Coalition of Planets. His assassination of Emperor Argall plunged Viltrum into a civil war where none but the strongest Viltrumites survived. He is the creator of the scourge virus that killed 99.9% of the Viltrumite population. Afterwards, Thaedus went on to establish the Coalition of Planets. Thaedus is later killed by Thragg during the failed sneak attack on Viltrum.
  - Space Racer: A technopathic member of the Coalition of Planets who wields the Infinity Ray, which has blasts capable of wiping anything in its path. He also rides a hover-cycle.
- D.A. Sinclair: A young and reclusive scientist at Upstate University and creator of the "Reanimen" who is thwarted by Invincible and then secretly hired by Cecil to build cyborg-like "soldiers" out of corpses as a backup army for fighting threats to the planet. After some time working with Cecil, Sinclair reforms and eventually helps Invincible and the surviving Guardians of the Globe fight against Robot.
  - Reanimen - A group of cyborg zombies intended to be "the soldiers of the future".
- Battle Beast: Thokk is a white lion-like alien called Dorions. After liberating his home world from alien oppressors he became obsessed with fighting and felt an insatiable need to engage in combat. His only goal in life being to find a champion who could beat him in a battle. First thought of as a villain in Invicible's initial encounter with him, Battle Beast turned out to be mostly neutral, not caring for good or bad, and lived only for combat and so would go wherever he could find it. He was imprisoned on the same Viltrumite Prison Warship where Allen the Alien and Nolan were held. Allen used Battle Beast's lust for battle to convince him into helping with their jailbreak and later joining up with the Coalition of Planets against Thragg by promising lots of combat and fighting against the Viltrumites, the strongest beings in the universe. Battle Beast and Thragg eventually met in hand-to-hand combat where they battled non-stop causing massive damage across the planet upon which they fought. After several days, Thragg was barely able to beat Battle Beast with Battle Beast's final words being "Thank you." Battle Beast had a daughter who ended up inheriting her father's unquenchable craving for combat. Battle Beast is also the protagonist of his own series detailing his appearances between 19 and 55 of the Invincible series.
- Prince Salaka: The Heir of the Fantanin Empire whose planet was take over by Juggernaut and her brother Colossus.
- Computer: A computer who was forced into working for Battle Beast.

=== Enemies ===
- David Hiles: A former weapons engineer for a military-sanctioned research firm who turned to teaching physics at "Reginald Vel Johnson High School" after his son's suicide and his own subsequent divorce and unemployment. He blamed his son's death on high school bullies and "popular" kids, and started kidnapping students and then turning them into human bombs that he would set off at malls and other teenager hangouts. Mark and Eve figure out what Hiles is doing and as Invincible and Atom Eve try to stop him, only to find Hiles waiting with a bomb strapped to his own chest. Invincible uses superspeed-flight to fly Hiles to Antarctica, where his suicide bomb goes off.
- Mauler Twins: An evil super-strong blue-skinned genius scientist and his clone who perfected cloning technology. They continuously argue as to which is the original, their rivalry driving their passion to create more and more advanced technology. They aid Angstrom Levy in his attempt to collect the knowledge of every multi-universal Angstrom into the Angstrom of their universe, which leads to deaths of several alternate-universe Maulers. During a fight against the Guardians of the Globe, both Mauler Twins are killed by Oliver, who alleges it was accidental. The Mauler Twins later return, having created countermeasures in the event that both of them die.
- Colossus of Emsiu: The brother of Juggernaut and the secondary antagonist of the Invincible Universe: series.
- Juggernaut of Emsiu: The sister of Colossus and the main antagonist of the Invincible Universe: Battle Beast series.
- Sanford: The former butler of Black Samson who wanted revenge on the Guardians of the Globe for firing Samson after Samson lost his powers. He stole Samson's super suit, went on a rampage, and later ended up incarcerated.
- Angstrom Levy: A genius with the ability to create portals to other universes who becomes one of Invincible's archenemies. In an attempt to amass a huge amount of knowledge about the multi-verse that he believes he will be able to use to better his world, he builds a machine with the aid of the Mauler Twins that connects him to the mind of every Angstrom Levy in every universe. The machine explodes mid-process, causing a chain reaction that disfigures him and wipes out every other Angstrom. He goes mad from having so many minds collected in his own, becoming obsessed with torturing and killing Invincible, whom he blames for the incident. Angstrom uses his ability to travel to other universes to heal and strengthen himself while also on multiple occasions using his portals to attack Invincible, Debbie, Oliver, and Eve, and in one attempt imports several evil Invincibles from alternate universes to cause destruction and havoc. Angstrom eventually regains his sanity thanks to Eve, but is then abducted by one of the surviving alternate-universe Invincibles and taken to that Invincible's universe where he is tortured. Angstrom is eventually beheaded by Robot when Mark's paranoia pushes him to follow Angstrom into that other universe with Robot's help. The Finale issue reveals that he has a son who seeks to avenge his death.
- The Viltrumites: Invincible and Omni-Man's species who are known conquerors of different planets.
  - Thragg: The Grand Regent of the Viltrum Empire. After being deposed by Omni-Man, he goes rogue and seeks vengeance on Omni-Man and his family. He later fathers an entire army of half-Viltrumite children in order to attack Earth. He is Invincible's archenemy and the main antagonist of the series. Thragg is ultimately killed by Invincible.
    - Ursaal: A Viltrumite/Thraxan daughter of Thragg and one of his many children. After realizing her father does not care for any of his offspring and only sees them as cannon-fodder she starts to reform and convinces her Viltrumite/Thraxan siblings to surrender in the final battle to the Coalition of Planets and to join in the battle against Robot and his army of drones to retake Earth.
    - Onaan: A Viltrumite/Thraxan who is one of Thragg's sons. He was a psychopath who loved to torture and keep trophies of his victims in his cave. He is killed by Invincible at Thragg's goading, much to Ursaal's dismay.
  - Conquest: An elderly, battle-scarred member of the Viltrum Empire. He is a psychopath who relishes in fighting and killing those who oppose the empire. He goes to Earth in search of Mark, with the goal of eliminating him, and the two engage in a bloody fight in which Atom Eve is almost killed and Invincible is injured, although he manages to defeat him. Conquest survives, but is imprisoned by Cecil for interrogation. However, after healing from his wounds, he manages to escape from captivity and flies into space to reunite with the remaining Viltrumites. Later, in the Viltrumite War, he has a second fight with Invincible, who although remains severely injured once again, manages to finally kill him.
  - Anissa: A Viltrumite who was infatuated with Invincible to the point that she raped him and gave birth to their son, Marky. She renounces her old ways after living on Earth and finding a loving human partner and a second child, Molly. She is killed by a Ragnarr while defending Eve as Eve attempts to retrieve a badly injured Nolan during the final battle with Thragg.
  - General Kregg: A member of the Viltrumites who possesses a cybernetic right eye. He takes many lovers when the Viltrumites relocate to Earth, not realizing that many humans practice monogamy, but ends up loving all the women and having many children.
  - Thula: A member of the Viltrumites who uses her long hair as a weapon.
  - Lucan: A member of the Viltrumites. Nolan disembowels Lucan during the Viltrumites' attack of Nolan and Mark on Thraxa. He survives and later ends up falling in love and having three children with a human woman on Earth.
  - Alternative Mark Graysons: Evil versions of Mark Grayson from parallel universes. Half of them are killed during the Invincible War where they attack the main Invincible's universe. Angstrom Levy sends the rest through portals to a universe with a completely desolate and devastated Earth where they end up going mad and killing and eating each other. The only surviving Mark (with a mohawk), takes Angstrom to his dimension and tortures him. When Robot and Mark from the main universe appear to check in on Angstrom, Robot, seeing how easily Mark took over this dimension, killed Angstrom and the alternate Mark before trapping the mainline Mark in the dimension. Mark poses as his alternate self for months while he works with Robot's counterpart to create a portal back to his dimension in exchange for one of the Mauler Twins giving Robot a new body modeled after the alternate Mark to help him restore peace to his dimension.
- The Flaxans: Aliens from another dimension, in which time passes at a dramatically faster pace.
- Doc Seismic: A villain with special gauntlets that enable him to induce earthquakes. He learns how to control an army of Magmanites and other subterranean monsters. He is later turned into a fully molten lava being by Volcanikka. He is killed by one of Robot's drones. He continually believes he is Invincible's archenemy, but Invincible always forgets who he is by the time they next battle.
  - Magmanites: A race of lava monsters who are docile when not being controlled by Doc Seismic.
- The Sequids: A group of tentacled aliens that share a hive mind, which is only activated if at least one of them is attached to a host body. Invaded Mars causing it to be quarantined.
- Rus Livingston: An astronaut accidentally left behind on Mars, he was attacked and made a host of the psychic Sequids.
- The Lizard League: A group of lizard-themed terrorists, they are parodies of several reptile-based villain groups: the Serpent Society, Hydra, and Cobra. The Lizard League consisted of lizard-named agents along with an army of human followers. Their secret headquarters lies in the Florida Everglades and bears a striking resemblance to a Cobra Terrordrome.
  - King Lizard: The leader of the Lizard League who is supposedly an expert strategist and an expert at hand-to-hand combat. King Lizard becomes the only surviving member of the Lizard League through cowardice that he claims is "intelligence".
  - Komodo Dragon: A Komodo dragon-themed member of the Lizard League with super-strength. He was killed when he bit off Rex Sloan's explosive hand.
  - Komodo Dragon II: The successor of the original Komodo Dragon.
  - Salamander: A salamander-themed member of the Lizard League with toxic abilities.
  - Iguana: A female iguana-themed member of the Lizard League with claws.
- Furnace: A villain with a massive steam-powered iron suit armed with dual flame-throwers and jets. He is actually a man made entirely of liquid heat from which the suit earns its power. Furnace later appeared as a member of the Order.
- Magnattack: A villain for hire with the ability to apparently push metal objects away from him, hence his massive armor plated suit.
- Kursk: A Russian villain for hire who can electrify single targets at a time. He was hired by Machine Head to deal with Titan, but was quickly defeated by the Guardians of the Globe.
- Tether Tyrant: A freelance villain with a vest which houses incredibly strong elastic appendages which can pull and throw victims around. Later merges with the sentient alien vest.
- Magmaniac: A freelance villain who is part lava.
- Master Mind: A criminal with the ability to mentally control the bodies of large groups of people. He was previously seen in the pages of Brit.
- Bi-Plane: An age-old villain who believes in using old-fashioned technology for his attacks.
- The Elephant: A small-time elephant-themed supervillain who has been described in-story as a "lame Rhino rip-off".
- Giant: An eight-year-old boy who was pulled into another dimension, where he transformed by a sorcerer into a gigantic red cyclops. He became a king in the other dimension until he was teleported back by one of his enemies.
- Powerplex: whose real name is Scott Duvall, he is a Pentagon scientist whose sister Jessica was killed during the fight between Invincible and Omni-Man. Vowing revenge, he stole experimental technology to gain the power to absorb kinetic energy and release it as electrical discharges, but while he can absorb the energy, he has no control over it. In an attempt to get revenge, he accidentally causes the death of his wife Becky and their son Jack, which only causes him to further blame Invincible for ruining his life.
- Universa: A warrior queen from a distant world, she travels to Earth to harness its energy and save her homeworld. She was caught attacking a power plant and defeated by Invincible and Eve. She wields an energy-absorbing scepter, which strengthens her and emits powerful energy beams said to be capable of leveling cities.
- Volcanikka: A powerful lava elemental warrior who can control the Magmanites. She transforms Doc Seismic into her own so that he can rule by her side and help her conquer the surface world.
- The Order: A criminal organization with branches all over the world. The group was founded by Mister Liu, and is currently led by Set.
  - Set: An extra-dimensional being and the new leader of the Order. He and his brother Thoth battle each other to control different worlds and appease their father. Although he is not allowed to use his powers in his conquest, Set can freeze time and has superhuman strength and endurance.
  - Mister Liu: An elderly Asian cyborg and former leader of the Order. He can project his soul out of his body, taking the form of a giant Chinese dragon. This leaves his body unconscious and vulnerable to attack, so he relies on strong bodyguards to keep his body safe while the dragon rampages. His main mission for the Order was to free Multi-Paul from prison after he was captured by Invincible. Titan failed twice, leaving Liu to free Multi-Paul alone using his dragon.
  - Machine Head: A crime boss with a robotic head. He is deposed by Titan when his own henchman, Isotope, betrays him. Machine Head eventually escapes prison and takes control of the Order's Los Angeles branch, deciding to pardon Titan and Isotope for their betrayal under the guidance of the Order's new leader, Set.
  - Titan: Titan can encase his body in super-strong, nearly invulnerable rock. Titan first appeared in Capes. Titan was part of a criminal organization led by Machine Head. Titan tricks Invincible into helping him depose Machine Head and then installs himself as the new leader of the organization. His organization was part of an international syndicate called The Order run by Mister Liu. Titan's organization was kicked out of The Order for failing to cooperate with Liu and his demands, but is re-recruited by Set, and told that he would either work with him or be killed. Eventually, Titan, Machine Head, and Liu had to work together again to support Set's plans for the destruction of the world.
  - Isotope: A teleporting criminal who is Titan's lieutenant. He later appears as a member of The Order.
  - Embrace: An Israeli female supervillain and member of the Order with intangibility, possession, and invisibility powers.
  - Face: A Canadian supervillain and member of the Order whose head sports three eyes, two mouths, two noses, and a dual brain.
  - Insomniac: An Egyptian telepathic supervillain and member of the Order.
  - Multi-Paul: Paul Cha is Dupli-Kate's twin brother and a member of the criminal organization called the Order. He shares Kate's self-duplicating power. Angered by his sister's supposed death, he attacks her teammate Rex Splode and Invincible. Kate tries to stop her brother's rampage, but he is captured by Invincible. He later escapes from prison with the help of Mister Liu.
  - Octoboss: An octopus-like supervillain and member of the Order. He is always trying to speak English during battles despite being very terrible at it and never seeming to get any better because he says he needs practice.
  - Red Eye: A Brazilian supervillain and member of the Order who possesses heat vision.
  - Slaying Mantis: An Irish mantis-armored supervillain and member of the Order who has expert swordsmanship.
  - Walking Dread: A Polish electrokinetic supervillain and member of the Order with a monstrous appearance.
  - War Woman: Connie is a member of the Order. She was the former lover of the original War Woman until she was killed by Omni-Man, which led to her taking over Amazonia and planning revenge on the men of the world.
- Dinosaurus: Dr. David Anders is a mutant dinosauroid who transforms when he feels indifferent. As Dinosaurus, he is highly-intelligent and develops various plans to improve the world, but they are usually destructive and result in many lives being lost. Mark later breaks him out of prison and forms a partnership to figure out less destructive means to improve the world, but is forced to kill him when he cannot do so.

== Spin-offs, crossovers, and related titles ==
=== Guarding the Globe ===
A series focused on the Guardians of the Globe.

=== Invincible Universe: Battle Beast ===
Centers around Battle Beast in his adventures set between issues 19 and 55.

=== Invincible Universe ===
An anthology series that expands on the characters.

=== Invincible Returns ===
A one shot that hypes on Invincible's comeback.

=== Invincible Presents: Atom Eve ===
A series on how Atom Eve became a superhero.

=== Invincible Presents: Atom Eve & Rex Splode ===
A series on how Atom Eve first met Rex Splode.

=== Capes ===
A group of superheroes for hire doing their jobs. It was originally a small mini series of 3 issues but in 2025, the series was returned with new issues said to be 100 issues with new story arcs under the name Invincible Universe: Capes. It will also debut Ella Mental from the video game Invincible VS.

=== Tech Jacket ===
Debuting before Invincible the series focuses on Zach Thompson growing up to become a superhero and fights against alien threats. It had three series with the first being 8 issues, the 2nd series being 3, and the third series being 12.

=== Brit ===
Brit focuses on the titular character's solo adventures with three one shots and a 12 issue mini series. His story continues in the Guardians of the Globe series.

=== The Astounding Wolf-Man ===
The series focuses on Gary Hampton, the titular Wolf-Man in his 25 issue run.

=== The Pact ===
The first Invincible crossover with the titular character teaming up with other teen superheroes.

== Collected editions ==
=== Trade paperbacks ===
With the exception of volumes 14, 18, 22, 24, and 25, every volume of the Invincible trade paperbacks is named after a television sitcom:

Volume	Title	ISBN	Release date	Collected Material
Invincible
1	Invincible – Family Matters	ISBN 1-58240-320-1	2003-11-02	Invincible #1–4
2	Invincible – Eight Is Enough	ISBN 1-58240-347-3	2004-04-28	Invincible #5–8
3	Invincible – Perfect Strangers	ISBN 1-58240-391-0	2004-12-01	Invincible #9–13
4	Invincible – Head of the Class	ISBN 1-58240-440-2	2005-04-20	Invincible #14–19, Image Comics Summer Special
5	Invincible – The Facts of Life	ISBN 1-58240-554-9	2005-11-16	Invincible #0, #20–24, origin stories from #25
6	Invincible – A Different World	ISBN 1-58240-579-4	2006-06-05	Invincible #25–30
7	Invincible – Three's Company	ISBN 1-58240-656-1	2006-12-20	Invincible #31–35, The Pact #4
8	Invincible – My Favorite Martian	ISBN 1-58240-683-9	2007-07-19	Invincible #36–41
9	Invincible – Out of This World	ISBN 1-58240-827-0	2008-06-18	Invincible #42–47
10	Invincible – Who's the Boss?	ISBN 1-60706-013-2	2009-05-20	Invincible #48–53
11	Invincible – Happy Days	ISBN 1-60706-062-0	2009-08-24	Invincible #54–59, The Astounding Wolf-Man #11
12	Invincible – Still Standing	ISBN 1-60706-166-X	2010-05-26	Invincible #60–65
13	Invincible – Growing Pains	ISBN 1-60706-251-8	2010-08-25	Invincible #66–70, Invincible Returns #1
14	Invincible – Viltrumite War	ISBN 1-60706-367-0	2011-04-25	Invincible #71–78
15	Invincible – Get Smart	ISBN 1-60706-498-7	2012-01-11	Invincible #79–84
16	Invincible – Family Ties	ISBN 1-60706-579-7	2012-07-04	Invincible #85–90
17	Invincible – What's Happening?	ISBN 1-60706-662-9	2013-01-23	Invincible #91–96
18	Invincible – The Death of Everyone	ISBN 1-60706-762-5	2013-08-13	Invincible #97–102
19	Invincible – The War at Home	ISBN 1-60706-856-7	2014-03-11	Invincible #103–108
20	Invincible – Friends	ISBN 1-63215-043-3	2014-11-12	Invincible #109–114
21	Invincible – Modern Family	ISBN 1-63215-318-1	2015-06-24	Invincible #115–120
22	Invincible – Reboot?	ISBN 1-63215-626-1	2016-02-17	Invincible #121–126
23	Invincible – Full House	ISBN 1-63215-888-4	2017-03-29	Invincible #127–132
24	Invincible – The End of All Things, Part 1	ISBN 1-53430-322-7	2017-09-20	Invincible #133–138
25	Invincible – The End of All Things, Part 2	ISBN 1-53430-503-3	2018-03-28	Invincible #139–144
1	Invincible Compendium	ISBN 1-60706-411-1	2011-08-17	Invincible #0–47, Image Comics Summer Special, The Pact #4
2	Invincible Compendium	ISBN 1-60706-772-2	2013-08-14	Invincible #48–96, The Astounding Wolf-Man #11, Invincible Returns #1
3	Invincible Compendium	ISBN 1-5343-0686-2	2018-07-24	Invincible #97–144
1	Invincible New Edition	ISBN 1-5343-9995-X	2023-07-05	Invincible #1-7
2	Invincible New Edition	ISBN 1-5343-9903-8	2023-10-31	Invincible #8-13
3	Invincible New Edition	ISBN 1-5343-9809-0	2024-03-05	Invincible #14–19, Image Comics Summer Special
4	Invincible New Edition	ISBN 1-5343-9808-2	2024-08-14	Invincible #0, #20–24, origin stories from #25
5	Invincible New Edition	ISBN 1-5343-4026-2	2024-09-04	Invincible #25–30
6	Invincible New Edition	ISBN 1-5343-5805-6	2024-11-06	Invincible #31–35, The Pact #4
7	Invincible New Edition	ISBN 1-5343-7506-6	2025-01-01	Invincible #36–41
8	Invincible New Edition	ISBN 1-5343-9680-2	2025-03-05	Invincible #42–47
9	Invincible New Edition	ISBN 1-5343-2801-7	2025-05-07	Invincible #48–53
10	Invincible New Edition	ISBN 1-5343-2802-5	2025-07-02	Invincible #54–59, The Astounding Wolf-Man #11
11	Invincible New Edition	ISBN 1-5343-2803-3	2025-09-03	Invincible #60–65
12	Invincible New Edition	ISBN 1-5343-2804-1	2025-11-05	Invincible #66–70, Invincible Returns #1
13	Invincible New Edition	ISBN 1-5343-3289-8	2026-01-07	Invincible #71–78
14	Invincible New Edition	ISBN 1-5343-3008-9	2026-03-04	Invincible #79–84
15	Invincible New Edition	ISBN 1-5343-2992-7	2026-05-06	Invincible #85–90
16	Invincible New Edition	ISBN 1-5343-3272-3	2026-07-01	Invincible #91–96
17	Invincible New Edition	ISBN 1-5343-3531-5	2026-09-02	Invincible #97–102
Spin-offs
1	Invincible Presents: Atom Eve & Rex Splode	ISBN 1-60706-255-0	2010-07-14	Invincible Presents: Atom Eve #1–2, Invincible Presents: Atom Eve & Rex Splode #1–3
1	Invincible Universe – On Deadly Ground	ISBN 1-60706-820-6	2013-11-06	Invincible Universe #1-6
2	Invincible Universe – Above the Law	ISBN 1-60706-986-5	2014-05-07	Invincible Universe #7-12
1	Invincible Universe Compendium	ISBN 1-5343-9996-8	2023-06-7	Invincible Presents: Atom Eve #1–2, Invincible Presents: Atom Eve & Rex Splode #1–3, Guarding the Globe (vol. 1) #1-6, Guarding the Globe (vol. 2) #1-6, Invincible Universe #1-12
1	Invincible Universe: Battle Beast – Heart of Glory	ISBN 1-5343-3327-4	2025-11-12	Invincible Universe: Battle Beast #1–6, Battle Beast story from Skybound X #25

=== Hardcovers ===
Volume	Title	ISBN	Release date	Collected Material	Pages
1	Invincible Ultimate Collection	ISBN 1-58240-500-X	2005-07-13	Invincible #1–13	400
2	Invincible Ultimate Collection	ISBN 1-58240-594-8	2006-07-05	Invincible #0, #14–24, origin stories from #25, Image Comics Summer Special	352
3	Invincible Ultimate Collection	ISBN 1-58240-763-0	2007-08-08	Invincible #25–35, The Pact #4	336
4	Invincible Ultimate Collection	ISBN 1-58240-989-7	2009-04-29	Invincible #36–47	312
5	Invincible Ultimate Collection	ISBN 1-60706-116-3	2010-04-14	Invincible #48–59, The Astounding Wolf-Man #11	352
6	Invincible Ultimate Collection	ISBN 1-60706-360-3	2011-03-23	Invincible #60–70, Invincible Returns #1	336
7	Invincible Ultimate Collection	ISBN 1-60706-509-6	2012-02-22	Invincible #71–84	368
8	Invincible Ultimate Collection	ISBN 1-60706-680-7	2013-04-24	Invincible #85–96	296
9	Invincible Ultimate Collection	ISBN 1-63215-032-8	2014-08-06	Invincible #97–108	320
10	Invincible Ultimate Collection	ISBN 1-63215-494-3	2015-11-04	Invincible #109–120	336
11	Invincible Ultimate Collection	ISBN 1-5343-0045-7	2017-05-17	Invincible #121–132	304
12	Invincible Ultimate Collection	ISBN 1-5343-0658-7	2018-06-20	Invincible #133–144	344
1	The Complete Invincible Library	ISBN 1-58240-718-5	2007-03-14	Invincible #0–24, origin stories from #25, Image Comics Summer Special	768
2	The Complete Invincible Library	ISBN 1-60706-112-0	2010-06-09	Invincible #25–47, The Pact #4	768
3	The Complete Invincible Library	ISBN 1-60706-421-9	2011-11-30	Invincible #48–70, The Astounding Wolf-Man #11, Invincible Returns #1	768
4	The Complete Invincible Library	ISBN 1-53439-906-2	2023-11-22	Invincible #71-96	664
5	The Complete Invincible Library	ISBN 1-53439-770-1	2024-04-10	Invincible #97-120	624
6	The Complete Invincible Library	ISBN 1-53432-776-2	2024-08-21	Invincible #121-144	648
1	Invincible Omnibus	ISBN 1-5343-3298-7	2026-04-01	Invincible #0-47, Image Comics Summer Special, Marvel Team-Up #14, The Pact #4	1,208

=== Other collections ===
- Invincible also appeared in Marvel Team-Up Vol. 3 #14, which was collected in Marvel Team-Up Volume 3: League of Losers ISBN 0-7851-1946-9. This story occurs "between the pages" of Invincible #33.
- In November 2006, the Official Handbook of the Invincible Universe was released. This two-issue series told the origins of all of the characters seen in the series so far, and was done in the style of the Official Handbook of the Marvel Universe, including similar covers and many entries even being researched and written by former OHOTMU writer and researcher Peter Sanderson, as well as crediting late OHOTMU creator Mark Gruenwald as inspiration. The series was collected into a trade paperback in November 2007.

== In other media ==
=== Motion comics ===
The first 12 issues of the comic have been turned into a motion comic by Gain Enterprises using the Bomb-xx process, which was broadcast on MTV2 and downloadable to mobile phones, from iTunes and Amazon.

Cast

- Patrick Cavanaugh as Invincible
- Mark Fountain as Nolan Grayson
- Victoria Kelleher as Debbie Grayson
- Wendy Allyn as Atom Eve
- Stan Kirsch as Robot
- Jeff Shuter as William Clockwell
- J. Anthony McCarthy as Criminal
- Tom Ohmer as Cecil Stedman
- Hosea Chanchez as Mauler Twins
- Daniel Kirschner as Criminals
- Eric Wolfgang Nelson as Rex Splode
- Keith Stone as Allen the Alien
- Mike Connel as Derek
- Bill Garnet as Art Rosenbaum
- Leslie-Anne Huff as Dupli-Kate
- Paul Kresge as Teen Bomb
- Cynthia Sophiea as Mrs. Thatcher

=== Film ===
Point Grey Pictures and Skybound Entertainment were set to produce a live-action adaptation of Invincible with Seth Rogen and Evan Goldberg attached as writers and directors and Universal Pictures distributing it. Series creator Robert Kirkman was also set to produce the film, along with Rogen, Goldberg, David Alpert, Bryan Furst, and Sean Furst. In January 2021, Kirkman reaffirmed that the film is still in development despite the release of a streaming television adaptation, and that Rogen and Goldberg are still involved with the project.

=== Television series ===
On March 25, 2021, Amazon Studios began airing the first season of an adult animated adaptation of the comic series on Amazon Prime Video, executive produced by comic creator Robert Kirkman. The cast features Steven Yeun as Invincible, Sandra Oh as Debbie Grayson, and J. K. Simmons as Omni-Man. Rogen ending up being involved as a part of the cast, he and Goldberg were not set to direct/write the series, but did serve as executive producers. On April 29, 2021, Kirkman, along with Yeun, confirmed the series was coming back for a second and third season. The first half of the second season was released on November 2, 2023, with the latter half releasing on March 14, 2024. The third season premiered on February 6, 2025. The fourth season premiered on March 18, 2026. In July 2025, it was announced that Amazon had renewed the series for a fifth season.

=== Board games and video games ===
In July 2023, during San Diego Comic-Con, it was announced that Skybound Games and Ubisoft would release a mobile game based on the series, entitled Invincible: Guarding the Globe, which launched worldwide for iOS and Android on February 21, 2024. Despite sharing its title with the Guarding the Globe spin-off comic book series, the game does not adapt it and instead features an original story involving alternate dimensions and clones of characters battling each other.

On the same month Guarding the Globe was first announced, it was also announced that Skybound Games and Terrible Posture Games were developing a visual novel/turn-based RPG entitled Invincible Presents: Atom Eve which released on Steam and Epic Games Store on November 14, 2023 as the first-ever Invincible game ahead of Guarding the Globe.

A third Invincible video game, an open world AAA game for consoles and computers, is also reported to be in development after a successful crowdfunding round held by Skybound itself.

Omni-Man is a playable DLC character in Mortal Kombat 1 (2023), voiced by J. K. Simmons, reprising the role, playing several incarnations of Omni-Man from alternate realities, including a blue-suited version. Invincible also cameos in the game.

Invincible, Omni-Man, Atom Eve, Allen, and Dupli-Kate appear as purchasable skins in Fortnite. War Woman's Mace and the arm of a Reaniman are available as pickaxes, while The Immortal's head and Shrinking Rae are wearable Back Blings. Funko POP! versions of Invincible characters also appeared in the 2024 crossover video game Funko Fusion.

A 3v3 fighting game based on the television series adaptation, Invincible VS, was released on April 30, 2026.

Free League Publishing announced a Kickstarter campaign for a tabletop role-playing game spinoff called Invincible Superhero Roleplaying in 2025. The game was released in 2026.
