= Guardians of the Globe =

Fictional superhero group

- The Guardians of the Globe as seen on the cover of Guarding The Globe #1.

Publication information
- Publisher: Image Comics
- First appearance: Invincible #7 (December 2003)
- Created by: Robert Kirkman; Cory Walker

In-story information
- Member(s): Black Samson; Bulletproof; Cast Iron; Dupli-Kate; Pegasus; Monster Girl; Japandroid; Rex Splode; Robot; Kid Thor; Shapesmith; Shrinking Ray; Knockout; Le Brusier; Best Tiger; Yeti; Kaboomerang; Outrun; Ms. Popper; El Chupacabra; The Immortal; Brit

The Guardians of the Globe are a superhero team in American comic books published by Image Comics. They appear primarily in the comic book series Invincible and its television series adaptation, as well as the Image Universe comic book series Brit, Noble Causes, Dynamo 5, and Guarding the Globe. The original team was a parody of DC Comics' Justice League of America.

== Fictional team history ==
=== First group ===
In Image Comics, the original Guardians of the Globe are a private organization funded by War Woman and Darkwing, appearing in Invincible and Capes. This version of the Guardians was written as a pastiche of DC Comics' Justice League of America (JLA), with most of the Guardians having an obvious JLA analog. Robert Kirkman, in his author notes for Invincible: The Ultimate Collection, Volume 1, explains that he went with these archetypes because he had only 18 pages to get the reader to care for the characters before their brutal deaths.

The team included Darkwing (based on Batman); the Immortal (based on Superman along with elements of Vandal Savage); War Woman (based on Wonder Woman, with elements of Hawkgirl); Red Rush (based on The Flash); Aquarus, the King of Atlantis (based on Aquaman); Martian Man (based on Martian Manhunter); and the Green Ghost (based on Green Lantern). Omni-Man (also based on Superman) was a trusted associate of the Guardians, although he was never an official member of the team. Eventually, Omni-Man betrays and murders the Guardians after calling them to their headquarters on an emergency. The only member of the Guardians to survive the massacre was Black Samson, who was not an active member at that time.

The original Guardians of the Globe appear again later in the story when Invincible is temporarily sent back in time. In this alternate history, Invincible is able to warn the Guardians about Omni-Man's betrayal, allowing them to successfully subdue Omni-Man long enough for him to come to his senses and realizes that he does not want to kill his friends.

=== Second group ===
After the massacre of the original team, the United States government re-established the Guardians of the Globe under the supervision of the fictional Global Defense Agency. This new team is initially led by former Teen Team leader Robot under the direct supervision of Donald, the government's superhuman liaison. In addition to Robot, the original roster for the new team includes Dupli-Kate, Rex Splode, Monster Girl, Shrinking Rae, and Black Samson.

Bulletproof is eventually added to the team's roster as is the newly resurrected Immortal, who eventually replaces Robot as team leader. Although not members, Invincible and Atom Eve often help the team in dire circumstances.

Following the apparent death of Shrinking Rae and Dupli-Kate at the hands of Komodo Dragon of the Lizard League, the Immortal resigns from the Guardians.

=== Parody team and miniseries ===
In March 2010, Image began releasing teaser posters, announcing members of a new Guardians of the Globe team as a parody of Marvel's advertisements for the line-ups of their revamped Avengers, New Avengers, Secret Avengers, and Avengers Academy books. In order of appearance, the released posters were:

- Invincible from Invincible
- Spawn from Spawn
- Rick Grimes from The Walking Dead
- U.S. President Barack Obama from Bomb Queen
- Gary Potter, a parody of Harry Potter

In an interview with Comic Book Resources in March 2010, Kirkman explained that although the later images were deliberately farcical, the campaign was intended to announce a six-issue miniseries spinning out of Invincible. The miniseries, he said, would deal with the earthbound characters of the Invincible universe, while that title focused on "The Viltrumite War", an eight-issue storyline that would be set solely in space. The six-issue series, named Guarding the Globe (subtitled Under Siege on its trade paperback release), was launched on August 25, 2010. The Parody Team was featured in a one-page backup in all issues of the first issue.

Image released teaser images of the team's real members done in the same style as the parody images. In order appearance, This set of posters were:

- Brit from Brit
- Outrun
- Kaboomerang
- Yeti
- Bulletproof / Invincible II

Outrun, Kaboomerang, and Yeti are all new characters created for the series. Issue three of the new bimonthly miniseries also introduced El Chupacabra, a washed-up Mexican superhero who is an alcoholic and possesses razor-sharp claws. In issue four, seven additional new characters are added.

Japandroid
An android from Japan who resembles a young girl.
Cast Iron
Milos Stojakovic. A metal-skinned man from Yugoslavia.
Knockout
Sarah. A heroine from the United States of America with enchanted gloves that provide her superhuman agility, stamina, and strength. Formerly a Capes, Inc. character. Married to Kid Thor.
Best Tiger
A blindfolded marksman with genius-level intellect from the People's Republic of China. Assumed to be blind, he actually wears the blindfold for the challenge.
Le Brusier
A French bulldog from France with super-strength, superhuman durability, and super-speed.
Kid Thor
Mason. A mallet-wielding strongman from Canada, also formerly from Capes, Inc. Married to Knockout.
Pegasus
Mariya Antonov. A winged woman from Russia with superhuman sight. Only member to interpret Le Brusier's barks.

This team was featured in the following set of series: Guarding the Globe Vol 1 #1-6: Under Siege, Guarding the Globe Vol 2 #1-6: Hard to Kill and Invincible Universe #1-12: On Deadly Ground and Above The Law. All three series were later collected together with Invincible Presents: Atom Eve and Invincible Presents: Atom Eve & Rex Splode in Invincible Universe Compendium.

When Robot began establishing a secret world dictatorship under his control in the main Invincible series, he sought to eliminate the Guardians. In Robot's initial attack, Black Samson, Knockout, and Kid Thor were killed. Brit, Outrun, Kaboomarang, Le Brusier, Pegasus, and Yeti were all later captured by Robot's drones following Bulletproof's betrayal of the remaining Guardians in exchange for his freedom. Of the Guardians present, only Best Tiger escaped while The Immortal and Dupli-Kate went into hiding. By the end of Invincible's run, Monax and Kid Invincible joined the team, overseen by the redeemed Robot's brain.

== In other media ==
=== Television ===
Both incarnations of the Guardians of the Globe appear in the Invincible streaming television series adaptations, with the characters voiced by the following actors:

- Immortal, Aquarus, Robot (Season 4) and Rudy voiced by Ross Marquand
- War Woman voiced by Lauren Cohan
- Alana / Green Ghost and her unnamed predecessor voiced by Sonequa Martin-Green and Chris Diamantopoulos respectively
- Martian Man voiced by Chad L. Coleman
- Red Rush voiced by Michael Cudlitz
- Darkwing voiced by Lennie James
- Robot (Seasons 1–3) voiced by Zachary Quinto
- Rex Splode voiced by Jason Mantzoukas
- Kate Cha / Dupli-Kate voiced by Malese Jow
- Rachel / Shrinking Rae and Monster Girl's human form voiced by Grey DeLisle
- Monster Girl's ogre form voiced by Kevin Michael Richardson
- Black Samson voiced by Khary Payton
- Bulletproof voiced by Jay Pharoah
- Shapesmith voiced by Ben Schwartz
- Nightboy / Darkwing II voiced by Cleveland Berto
- Brit voiced by Jonathan Banks

=== Video games ===
The Guardians of the Globe (except the alter egos of Robot and Monster Girl) also appear as playable characters in the 2024 free-to-play mobile role-playing game Invincible: Guarding the Globe on iOS and Android. Despite all of the abovementioned characters being members of the Guardians of the Globe at some capacity, this game assigns some of them to other factions, such as Dupli-Kate being part of the Global Defense Agency.

Members of the Guardians of the Globe, including Robot, Rex Splode, Dupli-Kate, Monster Girl, Bulletproof, and Immortal, appear as playable characters in Invincible VS.
