= MegaCon =

American speculative fiction convention

- MegaCon logo used since 2021
- Status: Active
- Genre: Speculative fiction
- Venue: Orange County Convention Center
- Locations: Orlando, Florida
- Coordinates: 28°25′33″N 81°27′54″W
- Country: United States
- Inaugurated: December 12, 1993 as Mega-Show; March 25–26, 1995 as MegaCon
- Most recent: March 19, 2026; 8 months ago
- Next event: May 20, 2027; 6 months' time
- Attendance: >200,000 in March 2026
- Organizer: Fan Expo HQ/Informa Connect
- Filing status: For-profit
- Website: fanexpohq.com/megaconorlando/

MegaCon, short for Mega Convention, is a large speculative fiction convention that caters to the comic book, sci-fi, anime, fantasy, RPG, and gaming communities, often occurring in spring at the Orange County Convention Center in Orlando, Florida. The convention is tied with New York Comic Con as the largest fan convention event in North America with an internally reported attendance of 200,000, and generating an economic impact of 405 million dollars in 2026.

== History ==
=== Founding ===
The first comic book convention held in the Orlando area was OrlandoCon, held annually from 1974 to 1994. Regular guests included C. C. Beck, Floyd Gottfredson, and Hal Foster. A competing show, "Mega-Show" was founded by James Breitbiel in December 1993 at the Holiday Inn International Drive (Now the Avanti Palms) Mega-Show would occur a few times a year with a larger show "MegaCon", also by Breitbiel, debuting in 1995 at the Orlando Expo Center (Now the UCF Center for Emerging Media). Along with the new show, there was a smaller sister show, Tampa Mega-Show. The convention was acquired by the Tampa-based publisher CrossGen in 1999 with the smaller Mega-Shows being discontinued, with Elizabeth Widera brought on to run the show in 2000 and Breitbiel moving on to become CrossGen's Marketing and Distribution Director. During this period, from 2000 to 2003, MegaCon heavily promoted CrossGen products as the show continued to grow. After being the venue once in 1997, the Orange County Convention Center has since 2001, been the host of the convention. The new location allowed MegaCon to be the home of the long-running "Paranoia LIVE!" from 2001 to 2019. LARP, based on Mongoose Publishing's Paranoia. In 2002, the logo was changed to one with rounded rectangular letters with a capital "G" in lowercase size.

2003 introduced after hours entertainment at the convention. This expanded to offsite locations in 2006. In late 2003, Widera purchased the convention from the failing CrossGen, which was restructuring (the publisher went bankrupt in 2004). Widera, who is a board member of the comics charity The Hero Initiative, ran the show along with her daughter Christine Alger until 2016.

In 2007, MegaCon hosted the first live presentation of the Web Cartoonists' Choice Awards. This was followed in August 2008 with the convention hosting the first inaugural Project Fanboy Awards ceremony, awarding authors, writers and publishers with honors voted on by Internet users on the Project Fanboy website. Following 2009, the Project Fanboy Awards event was discontinued.

In September 2008, MegaCon headquarters moved from Safety Harbor to Live Oak, Florida, although the actual convention remains in Orlando. In 2009, in addition to the main show, held February 27–March 1, convention organizers produced a "mini-MegaCon" held August 22–23 featuring a number of actors from the Buffy the Vampire Slayer TV show.

=== Fan Expo ===
MegaCon Tampa Bay logo

On April 7, 2015, it was announced that MegaCon had been sold to Informa. The con now operates under the auspices of Informa's Fan Expo group from Toronto and a regional office in Sarasota, although it has maintained the MegaCon branding. Following MegaCon 2015 it was announced that for the first time MegaCon will be extended to 4 days in 2016. as well as another mini-MegaCon event, "MegaCon Fan Days" on November 21–22, 2015. Shortly after MegaCon 2016, MegaCon Tampa Bay was announced for October 28–30. MegaCon Tampa last happened in 2018 and has not returned since due to the increasing sizes of convention rivals Tampa Bay Comic Con and Metrocon as well as the size limitations of the Tampa Convention Center. Stan Lee made a surprise appearance at MegaCon Tampa Bay 2017, his last at MegaCon, to raise funds for those affected by Hurricane Irma weeks prior.

=== Post-pandemic era ===
The 2020 event was cancelled due to the COVID-19 pandemic. Initially planned to be held April 16–19 and June 4–7, it was replaced by a smaller "limited edition" "mini-MegaCon" restricted to 25,000 in attendance with the next main event to be held on March 18–21, 2021. These dates were also cancelled with the next date, August 12–15 being a return to operations, though masks were mandated. During COVID, the show's website was redesigned with a new logo introduced as part of a larger rebranding of FanExpo with the text forming an arch. The 2021 event was plagued with many guest cancellations due to pandemic-caused filming conflicts affecting many including Elijah Wood, Brendan Fraser, and James Marsters who were to be among the headline celebrities of the event.

2022 featured a return to normal operations with Elijah Wood, Sean Astin, Dominic Monaghan, and Billy Boyd, the Hobbits of the Lord of the Rings, reuniting on stage as well as Kevin Smith and Jason Mewes of the Jay and Silent Bob show, Brendan Fraser, and Gina Carano being other highlight guest appearances. MegaCon inaugurated FanExpo's partnership with virtual auction site WhatNot, featuring a Virtual MegaCon with virtual celebrity signings, comic artist sketch streams, and streams of cosplay contests, as well as a WhatNot booth. Numerous traffic issues in the surrounding areas due to record attendance reached local news headlines. Several tiers of tickets including family packages and youth tickets were sold out on Saturday. Surpassing Comic Con International's attendance cap of 130,000, MegaCon became the second most attended fan convention in the United States after New York Comic Con. The last day of the 2022 convention hosted a memorial service for the late comic artist George Perez, who was a frequent guest at the convention.

2023 introduced advanced paid parking from several parking lots as well as shuttles to the convention as a way to alleviate traffic issues. A Wednesday pre-launch party was added to the afterhours party line up at ICON Park. Tickets for the 2024 event went on sale the day after the 2023 event ended, a change in tradition from tickets going on sale 5–6 months prior to the event. The 2023 event was plagued by overcrowding in celebrity areas and some hospitalizations occurred while a small fire also occurred in one of the food stands but no injuries resulted from it. The 2024 event did not see a repeat of these woes due to a redesigned celebrity area. 2024 debuted an afterhours takeover of Universal Islands of Adventure theme park.

=== Late 2020s ===
In 2025, MegaCon expanded their exhibit hall to take up the entire North/South Concourse, an area of 950,000 sqft, surpassing New York Comic Con's Javits Center as the largest used exhibition hall of a fan convention in North America. Tattoo vendors on the vendor floor were discontinued after being a mainstay of the exhibit hall. The theme park afterhours event from the previous year was expanded to both parks at Universal Orlando resort. A few events were added to the nearby Rosen Centre hotel including a breakfast event featuring Ashley Eckstein.

In 2026, the show further expanded by moving into nearly the entire West building including 1 million sqft of its exhibit hall space, making it the first comic convention in North America to surpass 1,000,000 sq ft (93,000 m^{2}) of used exhibit hall space. The show announced a large Lord of the Rings cast lineup which included several members of Wētā Workshop in a partnership of merchandise. Reaching over 200,000 attendees, the convention rivaled New York Comic Con in attendance to become the largest fan convention in North America. For 2027, Leap Events was replaced by Showpass for ticketing.

== Dates and guests ==
=== Notability guidelines for listing guests ===
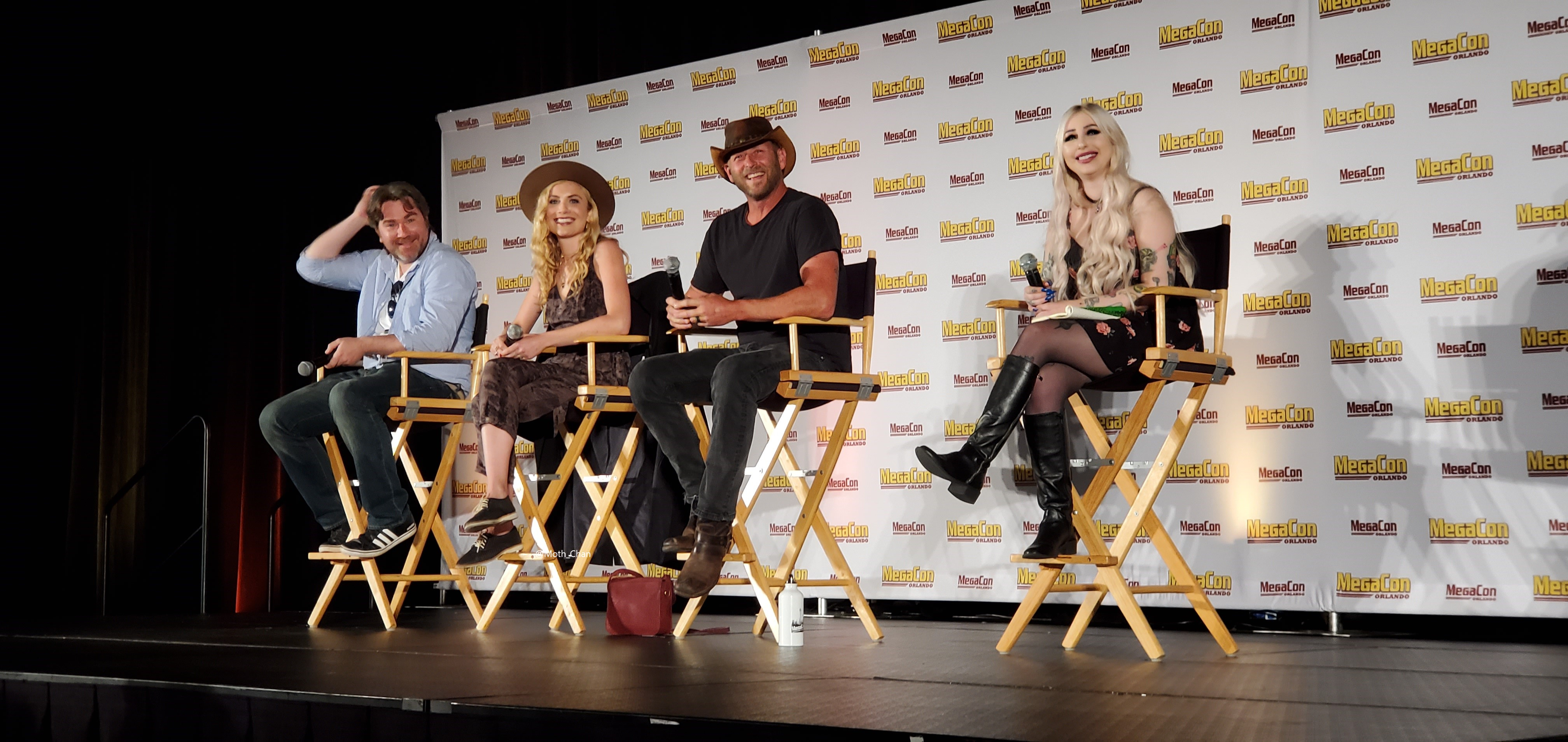
Red Dead Redemption 2's cast in a panel at MegaCon 2019

- Actors and voice actors are to be listed.
- Comic guests may be listed only if listed on MegaCon website or noted to have attended pre-2000.
- YouTubers may be listed only if they have reached the 100,000 subscribers eligible for a Silver Creator Award.
- Music performers may be listed if on MegaCon website as a guest.
- Book Authors may be listed only if on MegaCon website as a guest.
- Cosplay guests, tattoo artists, other artists, and retailers may not be listed.
- Guests partnered with vendor booths may be listed if they are actors/voice actors, renowned comic creators, or have met the 1 million subscribers eligible for a Gold Creator Award.

=== Mega-Show ===
Mega Show was the predecessor to MegaCon and 1995–99, was operated alongside MegaCon as a mini comics show by the same organizers.

| Dates | Building | City | Guests |
|---|---|---|---|
| December 12, 1993 | Holiday Inn, 6515 International Dr | Orlando | |
| February 6, 1994 | Holiday Inn | Orlando | |
| February 20, 1994 | Holiday Inn University Center, 316 W Tennessee St | Tallahassee | Martin Nodell |
| May 1, 1994 | Marriott Hotel, 8001 International Dr | Orlando | |
| May 15, 1994 | Ramada Resort, 820 E Busch Blvd. | Tampa | |
| May 22, 1994 | Holiday Inn University Center | Tallahassee | |
| July 10, 1994 | Colony Hotel (formerly Ramada Resort) | Tampa | William Tucci |
| July 24, 1994 | Marriott Hotel | Orlando | Colleen Doran |
| September 25, 1994 | Colony Hotel | Tampa | Buzz |
| October 16, 1994 | Marriott Hotel | Orlando | |
| November 6, 1994 | Colony Hotel | Tampa | Howard Chaykin |
| December 11, 1994 | Marriott Hotel | Orlando | Marat Mychaels, Tim Townsend |
| June 4, 1995 | Colony Hotel | Tampa | Miran Kim |
| July 23, 1995 | Marriott Hotel | Orlando | Adam Hughes, Brian Stelfreeze |
| September 17, 1995 | Best Western Resort (formerly Colony Hotel) | Tampa | Ben Dunn |
| November 5, 1995 | Marriott Hotel | Orlando | Ricky Carralero |
| November 19, 1995 | Marriott Hotel | Orlando | J. Scott Campbell |
| June 2, 1996 | Best Western Resort | Tampa | Michael Turner, David Wohl |
| July 28, 1996 | Marriott Hotel | Orlando | Dark One |
| September 29, 1996 | Best Western Resort | Tampa | Tim Townsend |
| December 8, 1996 | Marriott Hotel | Orlando | |
| August 3, 1997 | Best Western Resort | Tampa | Brett Booth, Jessica Ruffner |
| September 21, 1997 | Marriott Hotel | Orlando | Adam Hughes, Jason Pearson |
| November 23, 1997 | Best Western Resort | Tampa | David Mack |
| July 26, 1998 | Best Western Resort | Tampa | Matt "Batt" Banning |
| November 15, 1998 | Best Western Resort | Tampa | Walter McDaniel |
| July 25, 1999 | Travelodge (formerly Best Western) | Tampa | Bob Layton |

=== 1990s and 2000s ===
==== Early years and CrossGen ====
| Dates | Building | Official guests | Notes |
|---|---|---|---|
| March 25–26, 1995 | Orlando Expo Center | Joel Adams, Sergio Aragonés, Aldrin Aw, Matt "Batt" Banning, John Beatty, Julie Bell, Joe Benitez, Dan Brereton, Buzz, J. Scott Campbell, Howard Chaykin, Gene Colan, Colleen Doran, Jordi Ensign, Alex Garner, Dick Giordano, Everette Hartsoe, George Jeanty, Gil Kane, Rick Levins, Joe Madureira, Bill Marimon, George Perez, Brandon Peterson, Tom Peyer, Almando Rodriguez, Javier Saltares, Alex Saviuk, Marc Silvestri, Louise Simonson, Walt Simonson, Louis Small Jr., William Stout, Tim Townsend, William Tucci, Boris Vallejo, Brad Vancata | First MegaCon |
| March 8–10, 1996 | Orlando Expo Center | John Beatty, Ricky Carralero, Howard Chaykin, Terry Collins, Amanda Conner, Kevin Conrad, Jeremy Cox, Tony Daniel, Dick Giordano, Adam Hughes, Joe Jusko, Trent Kaniuga, Frank Lopez, Joe Madureira, Todd McFarlane, Martin Nodell, Jimmy Palmiotti, George Pérez, Tom Peyer, Joe Quesada, John Romita Sr., Brian Stelfreeze, William Stout, Tim Townsend, William Tucci, Ethan Van Sciver | 10,000 attendees |
| March 15–16, 1997 | West Concourse Hall A4 | Matt "Batt" Banning, Jason Baumgartner, John Beatty, Joe Benitez, Brett Booth, Rick Buckler, Jr., Greg Capullo, Ricky Carralero, Peter Chung, Scott Ciencin, Tony Daniel, Peter David, José Delbo, Jordi Ensign, Dick Giordano, Jack Gray, Randy Green, Jim Harrison, Everette Hartsoe, Don Hillsman, Robb Horan, Steven Hughes, Chad Hunt, Jason Jenson, Tom Joyner, Josue Justiniano, Ray Lago, Bob Layton, Jon Lewis, Chris Leidenfrost, Steve Lieber, Rob Liefeld, David W. Mack, Joe Madureira, Bill Marimon, Nathan Massengill, Todd McFarlane, Dave Megill, Jude Millien, Shelly Moldoff, Jim Mooney, Mark Morales, Mart Nodell, Dark One, Mike Okamoto, Jeff Parker, Dan Parsons, George Perez, Don Perlin, Brandon Peterson, Tom Peyer, Richard Pini, Wendy Pini, Jeff Pittarelli, Brian Pulido, Humberto Ramos, John Romita Sr., Jessica Ruffner, Charles William Satterlee, Julius Schwartz, Steve Scott, Howard Shum, Alex Simmons, Slick, Louis Small, Jr., Arne Starr, J. Michael Straczynski, Naser Subashi, Eman Torre, Tim Townsend, William Tucci, Brad Vancatta, Dexter Vines, The Ultimate Warrior, Mitch Waxman, Jeff Whiting, Xavier | First show in Orange County Convention Center |
| March 13–15, 1998 | Orlando Expo Center | Actors: Robin Downs, Stephen Furst, Jonathan Harris Writers and artists Franco Aureliani, Matt "Batt" Banning, John Beatty, Julie Bell, Tom Biondolillo, Steve Bryant, John Byrne, Greg Capullo, Peter Caravette, Captain Kyle Dakota, Danny DeAngelo, Brian Denham, Larry Elmore, Dave Finch, Thomas Fleming, Thomas Florimonte, Ramona Fradon, Franco, Leeann Garner, Dusty Griffin, Austin Guerin, Jim Harrison, Tom Hart, Everette Hartsoe, Drew Hayes, David Hernandez, Jacinto Hernandez, Robb Horan, Greg Horn, Georges Jeanty, Casey Jones, Josue Justiniano, Gil Kane, Rafael Kayanan, Christine Kerrick, Rich Koslowski, Harry Lampert, Bob Layton, Chris Leidenfrost, Jon Lewis, Rob Liefeld, Joseph M. Linsner, Mark Lipka, Jeph Loeb, David Mack, Rick Magyar, Dan Maitz, Roland Mann, Thomas Manning, Jeff Mason, Nathan Massengill, Todd McFarlane, Ed McGuiness, Dan Membiella, Shelly Moldoff, Jim Mooney, Monte Moore, Bill Neville, Mart Nodell, Phil Nutman, Mike Okamoto, Carlos Pacheco, Dan Parsons, Jim Pavelec, Ken Penders, George Perez, Don Perlin, Brandon Peterson, Jeff Pittarelli, Mark Poole, Brian Pulido, Andrew Robinson, Don Rosa, Craig Rousseau, Alex Saviuk, Steve Scott, Howard Shum, Andy Smith, Arne Starr, Dan Stepp, Eman Torre, Tim Townsend, William Tucci, Michael Turner, Boris Vallejo, Brad Vancatta, Tim Vigil, Ray Villarosa, Dexter Vines, Mark Waid, Adam Wallenta, Jeff Whiting, Bill Williams, Monte Wilson, David Wohl, Michael Wright, Philip Xavier, Chris Yambar | 11,500 attendees |
| March 5–7, 1999 | Orlando Expo Center | Actors: Alley Baggett, Angela Cartwright, Gerard Christopher, Richard Herd, Marta Kristen, DeDe Lind, Janet Luppo, Alisha Oreskovich, Butch Patrick, Debbie Rochon, Brinke Stevens, Paris Themmen, Victoria Zdrok Writers and artists Deborah Abbott, Neal Adams, Karl Altstaetter, Dick Ayers, Jason Baumgartner, Greg Beettam, Julie Bell, David Berkebile, Terry Brooks, J. Scott Campbell, Ben Capozzi, Joe Casey, Keu Cha, James Chambers, Ian Churchill, Dorian Cleavenger, Darryl Cobbs, James Collins, Lowell Cunningham, Mark C. Cuventas, Danny DeAngelo, Dave Devries, Darrell Donald, Colleen Doran, Joshua Dysart, Will Eisner, Tony Fanning, Ozvaldo Fernandez, Thomas Fleming, Ramona Fradon, Cliff Galbraith, Christopher T. Gerow, Dick Giordano, Randy Green, Brian Haberlin, Eric Wolfe Hanson, Andy Hartnell, Matt Hawkins, Jacinto Hernandez, Mike Hoffman, Miguel A. Insignares, Tony Isabella, Austin Janowsky, Georges Jeanty, Casey Jones, Charles Keegan, Jim Krueger, Ray Lago, Harry Lampert, Bob Layton, Steve Leiber, Chris Leidenfrost, Jason Liebig, Rob Liefeld, Jeph Loeb, David Mack, Howard Mackie, Joe Madureira, Rick Magyar, Pablo Marcos, Richard Maurizio, Don McGregor, Gary Mckee, Shelly Moldoff, Monte Moore, Mart Nodell, Mark Oakley, William O'Neill, Robert Parzek, Jr., Ken Penders, George Perez, Don Perlin, Brandon Peterson, Joe Pruett, Andrew Robinson, Alex Ross, Jim Royal, Alex Saviuk, Douglas Schuler, Andy Smith, Arne Starr, J. Michael Straczynski, Tara Tallan, Peter Telep, Mike Torrance, Tim Townsend, William Tucci, Jan Utstein-O'Neill, Boris Vallejo, Brad Vancatta, Tim Vigil, Ron Walotsky, L. A. Williams, David Wohl, Philip Xavier | 14,000 attendees |
| March 31-April 2, 2000 | Orlando Expo Center | Actors: Gloria-Anne Gilbert, Mark Goddard, Jennifer LaVoie, Sable, Richard A. Searfoss, Paris Themmen, Nicole Wood Writers and artists Deborah Abbott, Mike Atiyeh, Franco Aureliana, Dick Ayers, Art Baltazar, Joe Benitez, Lee Bermejo, Al Bigley, Tom Biondolillo, Brett Booth, Jess Ruffner-Booth, David Brewer, Clayton Brown, Steve Bryant, William Caligan, Ben Capozzi, Richard Case, Claudio Castellini, James Chambers, Jim Cheung, Ian Churchill, Amanda Conner, Andrew Crossley, Frank D'Armata, Danny DeAngelo, José Delbo, John Dell, Pierre-Andre Dery, ELF, Harlan Ellison, Jason Engle, Garth Ennis, Sean Patrick Fannon, Steve Firchow, Tom Fleming, Don Fraga, Dick Giordano, Owl Goingback, Randy Green, Sanford Greene, D. Alexander Gregory, Scott Grimes, Brian Haberlin, Eric Wolfe Hanson, Tony Harris, Matt Hawkins, Clayton Henry, Jacinto E. Hernandez, Don Hillsman, Bryan Hitch, Mike Hoffman, Greg Horn, Rob Hunter, Jamal Igle, Bob Ingersoll, Austin Janowsky, Casey Jones, Georges Jeanty, Lloyd Kaufman, Rafael Kayanan, Barbara Kesel, Karl Kesel, Rick Ketcham, Leonard Kirk, Ben Lai, Ray Lai, Harry Lampert, Bob Layton, Stephanie Lantry, Stan Lee, Chris Leidenfrost, Steve Lieber, Rob Liefeld, Joseph Michael Linsner, Jeph Loeb, Rick Maguire, Rick Magyar, Ron Marz, Jose Marzan Jr., Garry W. McKee, Scott Meyers, Joshua Middleton, Shelly Moldoff, Brian Monroe, Monte M. Moore, Doug Murray, David Napiliello, Martin Nodell, Andy Park, Jimmy Palmiotti, Dan Parsons, Mark Pennington, George Pérez, Don Perlin, Brandon Peterson, Jeff Pittarelli, Sergei Poyarkov, Brian Pulido, James Pruett, Joe Pruett, Joe Quesada, Humberto Ramos, Robert Rhett, Andrew Robinson, Ceasar Rodriguez, John Romita, Sr., Jim Royal, Tom Rozakis, Paul Ryan, Alex Saviuk, Kevin Sharpe, Louis Small, Jr., Andy Smith, Ray Snyder, Tom Snyder, Arnie Starr, Mike Torrance, Tim Townsend, Billy Tucci, Kevin Tucker, Michael Turner, Ethan Van Sciver, Dexter Vines, Scott Wilson, Barry Windsor-Smith, David Wohl, John Wycough, Philip Xavier Cancelled Cully Hamner, Magic Johnson | 20,000 attendees Last show at Orlando Expo Center |
| March 2–4, 2001 | West Concourse Hall C | Actors: Amber Benson, Richard Biggs, Nicholas Brendon, Conrad Brooks, Phil Brown, Jason Carter, Angela Cartwright, Mike Edmonds, Mark Goddard, Jonathan Harris, William Hootkins, Marta Kristen, Richard LeParmentier, June Lockhart, Bob May, Peter Mayhew, Zoe McLellan, Bill Mumy Other listed guests: Voice actors / Sean Schemmel, Eric Vale; Comic creators / Deborah Abbott, Michael Atiyeh, Franco Aureliani, Art Baltazar, Adam Beranek, Al Bigley, Tom Biondolillo, Steve Bird, Bill Black, Terri Boyle, Tom Brevoort, Chris Brunner, Kurt Busiek, Talent Caldwell, Will Caligan, Nick Cardy, Ricky Carralero, Richard Case, Joe Casey, Jim Cheung, William Christensen, Scott Ciencin, Matt Coleman, Amanda Conner, Andrew Crossley, Shawn Crystal, Chuck Cuidera, Peter David, John Dell, Andrea DiVito, Joshua Dysart, Scot Eaton, Elf, Steve Epting, Tom Fleming, Karl Gee, Shannon Reinbold-Gee, Drew Geraci, Brent Giles, Owl Goingback, Dick Giordano, Christian Gossett, Randy Green, Sanford Greene, Austin Guerin, Elio Guevara, Brian Haberlin, Eric Wolfe Hanson, Tony Harris, S. Clarke Hawbaker, Pamela Hazelton, Mark Heike, Stephanie Sanderson Heike, Andrew Hennessy, Clayton Henry, Don Hillsman II, Mike Hoffman, Morry Hollowell, Greg Horn, Zach Howard, Benjamin Hunzeker, Mitch Hyman, Sherard Jackson, Austin Janosky, Paul Jenkins, Drew Johnson, Dan Jolley, Casey Jones, Nat Jones, Joe Jusko, Bradley James Kayl, Barbara Kesel, Rick Ketcham, Leonard Kirk, John Kissee, Richard Kulpa, Harry Lampert, Greg Land, Dave Lanphear, Stephanie Lantry, Rich Larson, Cory Laub, Tzvi Lebetkin, Chris Leidenfrost, Steve Lieber, Joseph Michael Linsner, John Livesay, John Lowe, Rick Magyar, Sam Maronie, Ron Marz, Jose Marzan Jr., Richard Maurizio, Bob McLeod, Garry McKee II, Steve McNiven, Dan Membiela, JD Mettler, Ric Meyers, Roxanne Michaels, David Modica, Joe Monks, Sam Moronie, Stanley Morrison, Matthew Morrow, Trish Mulvihill, David Napoliello, Ingrid Neilson, Martin Nodell, Phil Noto, Jimmy Palmiotti, Andy Park, Dan Parsons, Paul Pelletier, Ken Penders, Brandon Peterson, Jeff Pittarelli, Brian Pulido, Pat Quinn, Wil Quintana, Morgan Reinbold, Andrew Robinson, Caesar Rodriguez, Tone Rodriguez, John Romita Jr, John Romita Sr., Jim Royal, Oscar Saavedra, Alex Saviuk, Bart Sears, Kevin Sharpe, David Siegel, Jim Silke, Louis Small Jr., Andy Smith, Jonathan D. Smith, John Calvin Smith, Ray Snyder, Tom Snyder, Lilith Stabs, Roy Thomas, Brett Thompson, Mike Torrance, Carmen Treffiletti, Billy Tucci, Kevin Tucker, George Tuska, Jan Utstein-O'Neill, Jim Valentino, Ethan Van Sciver, Manny Vega, Tim Vigil, Mark Waid, Stacy Walker, Jason Walker, Greg Waller, Blake Wilkie, David Wohl, Bernie Wrightson, John Wycough, Philip Xavier, John Zulia; Cancelled Lloyd Kaufman, David Prowse | Show moves to the Orange County Convention Center |
| February 22–24, 2002 | West Concourse Hall E | Actors: Steven Kent Austin, Kenny Baker, Amber Benson, Richard Biggs, Nicholas Brendon, Paul Blake, Michonne Bourriague, Jason Carter, Mark Goddard, Jenette Goldstein, Erin Gray, Andy Hallett, Virginia Hey, Lloyd Kaufman, Marta Kristen, June Lockhart, George Lowe, Bob May, Zoe McLellan, Jason Mewes, David Prowse, Mike Quinn, Eugene Roddenberry Jr., Mark Rolston, Kevin Smith, Al Snow Other listed guests: Voice actors / Sonny Strait, Eric Vale; Comic creators / Sergio Aragonés, Michael Atiyah, Jeff Austin, Scott Beatty, Tony Bedard, Brian Michael Bendis, Christian Beranek, Tom Biondollilo, Josh Blaylock, Richard Bonk, Brett Booth, Mark Brooks, Michael Broom, Clayton Brown, Chris Burke, Steven Butler, Mitch Byrd, Wil Caligan, Eddie Campbell, Nick Cardy, Joe Casey, Jim Cheung, Scott Ciencin, Matt Coleman, Andrew Crossley, Lowell Cunningham, Frank D'Armata, John Dell, Laura DePuy, Jean-Paul Deshong, Andrea Di Vito, Dan Donovan, Dave Dorman, Mike Dubisch, Scot Eaton, Alfonso Eljaiek, Steve Epting, Tom Feister, Derrick Fish, G W Fisher, Tom Fleming, Ramona Fradon, Shannon Reinbold-Gee, Drew Geraci, Dick Giordano, Christian Gossett, Randy Green, Sanford Greene, Raven Gregory, Butch Guice, Tony Harris, Jim Harrison, Andrew Hennessy, Phil Hester, Janet Hetherington, Don Hillsman II, Morry Hollowell, Greg Horn, Zach Howard, Rob Hunter, Mitch Hyman, Carmine Infantino, Bob Ingersoll, Drew Johnson, Jeff Johnson, Dan Jolley, Casey Jones, Barbara Kesel, Rick Ketcham, Leonard Kirk, Greg Kirkpatrick, James Kolchalka, Andy Kuhn, Steve Kurth, Jason Lambert, Greg Land, Stephanie Lantry, John Larter, David Lasky, Bob Layton, Andy Lee, Chris Leidenfrost, Joseph Michael Linsner, David W. Mack, Rick Magyar, Bill Marimon, Jason Martin, Ron Marz, Jose Marzan, Jeff Mason, Garry W McKee II, Steve McNiven, Angel Medina, David Meikis, Jen Van Meter, JD Mettler, Karl Moline, Jim Mooney, Stanley Morrison, Philip Moy, Patrick Mulvihill, Jason Narvaez, Bobby Nash, Martin Nodell, Phil Noto, Michael Avon Oeming, Jana Oliver, Ande Parks, Paul Pelletier, George Pérez, Mike Perkins, Brandon Peterson, Richard Pini, Wendy Pini, Chris Pitzer, Justin Ponsor, James Pruett, Joe Pruett, Wil Quintana, Alex Robinson, James Rochelle, Caesar J Rodriguez, Tone Rodriguez, John Romita Sr., Greg Rucka, Matthew Ryan, Paul Ryan, Maria Savarese, Alex Saviuk, Ron Schwager, Steve Scott, Bart Sears, Tim Seeley, Mike Shoemaker, Terry Shoemaker, Tom Simmons, Louis Small, Jr., Andy Smith, Ray Snyder, Thomas M. Snyder, Jen Sorensen, J. David Spurlock, Lilith Stabs, Arne Starr, Joe Staton, Ron Sutton, Roy Thomas, Yoshiki Tokushu, Mike Torrance, Carmen Treffiletti, Billy Tucci, George Tuska, Manny Vega, Matt Wagner, Mark Waid, Jason Walker, Danny Waters, Matt Webb, Mark Wheatley, Barry Windsor-Smith, Bernie Wrightson, John Wycough, Philip Xavier, Kelly Yates, Skottie Young | |
| February 28–March 2, 2003 | West Concourse Hall C | Actors: Richard Biggs, Anthony Cistaro, Brian Downey, Jamie Farr, Kathy Garver, Gil Gerard, Erin Gray, Jonathan Hardy, Virginia Hey, Lloyd Kaufman, Walter Koenig, Gary Lockwood, Peter Mayhew, Dina Meyer, Nichelle Nichols, David Prowse, Michael Rosenbaum, Paul Schrier, Xenia Seeberg, Robert Trebor, Lani Tupu, Patricia Zentilli Other listed guests: Comic creators / Luis Amado, Jeff Amano, Michael Atiyeh, John Beatty, Scott Beatty, Tony Bedard, Nick Bell, Adam Beranek, Christian Beranek, Al Bigley, Tom Biondolillo, Steve Bird, Bill Black, Josh Blaylock, Mark Brooks, Michael Broom, Clayton Brown, Steve Bryant, Chris Burke, Ariel Rivero Capote, J. Scott Campbell, Jose Caraballo, Richard Case, Jimmy Cheung, Frank Cho, Lindsay Cibos, Scott Ciencin, Daniel Clark, Steve Conley, Amanda Conner, Marie P Croall, Andrew Crossley, Lowell Cunningham, Frankie D'Armata, Adam Davis, Jason Day, John G Dell, Andrea Di Vito, Chuck Dixon, Silas H Dixon, Kristian Donaldson, Dale Eaglesham, Alfonso Eljaiek, Steve Epting, David Fairley, Lee Ferguson, Jim Fern, Derrick Fish, G W Fisher, Tom Fleming, Thomas Florimonte, James Allen Fredrick, Chris Garcia, Karl M Gee, Drew Geraci, Owl Goingback, Christian Gossett, Brian C Graham, Tamara Gray, Randy Green, Sanford Greene, Barry Gregory, Jenni Gregory, Raven Gregory, Butch Guice, Larry Guidry, Bo Hampton, Brian Hartman, Mark G Heike, Andrew Hennessy, Janet L Hetherington, Don Hillsman II, William J Hodgson, Morry J Hollowell, Greg Horn, Adam Hughes, Matt Hughes, Rob Hunter, Mitch Hyman, Bob Ingersoll, Dan Jaaren, Austin Janowsky, Philip Jean-Pierre, Drew Johnson, Jeff Johnson, Dan Jolley, Casey Jones, Chuck Jones, John Kalisz, Brad Kayl, Jason Keith, Barbara Kesel, Rick Ketcham, Aaron Paul Killian, Leonard Kirk, Tyler Kirkham, Greg Kirkpatrick, Jennifer Klein-Martin, Josh Krach, Greg Land, Stephanie Lantry, Bob Layton, Eric Layton, Andy Lee, Chun Lee, Chris Leidenfrost, Jay Leisten, Steve Lieber, Ron Lim, Aaron Lopresti, Andrew LoVuolo, James E Lyle, Rick Magyar, Jon Malin, Bill Marimon, Ron Marz, Brian Martin, Dash Martin, Jason Martin, Laura Martin, Jose Marzan Jr., Garry W McKee II, Steve McNiven, Angel Medina, David Meikis, Christopher Mills, Larry Molinar, Karl Moline, Jim Mooney, Stanley Morrison, Patricia Mulvihill, Bobby Nash, Ingrid Neilson, Graham Nolan, Phil Noto, Mike Okamoto, William O'Neill, Andy Owens, Sumi Pak, Jimmy Palmiotti, Maria Paris, Roland Paris, Jeff Parker, Pat Parnell, Paul R Pelletier, Jason Peltz, Mark Pennington, Andrew Pepoy, George Pérez, Mike Perkins, Brandon Peterson, Justin Ponsor, Eric Powell, Robin Powell, Joe Pruett, Brian Pulido, Pat Quinn, Wil Quintana, Shannon Reinbold-Gee, James Ritchey III, David A Rivera, James Rochelle, Robert Rodi, Tone Rodriguez, Ben Rosa, Matthew Ryan, Paul Ryan, Tom Ryder, Aaron Sacharow, Jim Salicrup, Alex Saviuk, Stuart Sayger, Jason Schnabel, Rob Schwager, Bart Sears, Jessica Senia, Jim Seufert, Michael Shoemaker, Terry Shoemaker, Howard M Shum, Tom Simmons, Andy Smith, Matthew Dow Smith, Snakebite, Joy Snyder, Ray Snyder, Tom Snyder, Jason Sobol, Sherrie Spencer, Missy Spring, Arne Starr, Josh Sullivan, Shawn A Surface, Ronn Sutton, Jean P Targete, Peter Telep, Scott Thomason, Mike Torrance, Carmen Treffiletti, Brad Vancata, Manny Vega, Tim Vigil, Laura Villari, Neil D Vokes, Jason Walker, Danny Waters, Matt Wieman, Michael Wieringo, Blake Wilkie, John Wycough, Kelly Yates, Thom Zahler, Mike Zeck; Cancelled Scott McDaniel, Ted Raimi, Kelsey Shannon, Al Snow, Roy Thomas | Last event by CrossGen |

==== Widera ====
| Dates | Building | Official guests | Notes |
|---|---|---|---|
| March 5–7, 2004 | West Concourse Hall C | Actors: Amy Allen, Michonne Bourriague, Angela Cartwright, Brad Dourif, Ken Foree, Mark Goddard, Sid Haig, Noah Hathaway, Virginia Hey, Herbert Jefferson, Jr., Walter Koenig, Marta Kristen, June Lockhart, BarBara Luna, Deanna Lund, Allison Mack, Bob May, Kenny Miller, Bill Mumy, Glenn Shadix, Marc Singer, Brian Thompson Other listed guests: Voice actors / Victoria Harwood, George Lowe; Comic creators / Danny Allain, Luis Amado, Kaare Andrews, Robert Atkins, Robert Baker, John Beatty, Shaun Beaudry, Tony Bedard, Jamie Biggs, Tom Biondolillo, Bill Black, Rene Blanco, James 'Bukshot' Bukaskus, Jose Caraballo, Nick Cardy, Gil Carlo, Patrick Carlucci, Jim Cheung, Justin Chung, Amanda Conner, Daniel Cooney, Matthew L. Dalton, Shawn DePasquale, Laura DePuy, Chuck Dixon, Terry Dodson, Loki Dolza, Shawn Dubin, Nicole Edge, ELF, Steve Epting, Joe Fauvel, Scott Fensterer, Ozzy Fernandez, Glenda Finkelstein, Derrick Fish, Tom Fleming, Fred Gallagher, Tamara Gray, Sanford Greene, Barry Gregory, Jenni Gregory, Russell Hall, Cully Hamner, Bo Hampton, Chris Harden, Ryan Hentz, Drew Hennessy, William J Hodgson, Greg Horn, Adam Hughes, Mitch Hyman, Dan Jaaren, Sherard Jackson, Austin Janowsky, Jennifer Janviere-Farrell, Philip Jean-Pierre, Georges Jeanty, Phil Jimenez, Jeff Johnson, Nat Jones, Robert Jones, Jason Keith, Barbara Kesel, Leonard Kirk, Dick Kulpa, John LaFleur, Harry Lampert, Greg Land, Michael Lark, Rich Larson, Cory Laub, Andy Lee, Aaron Lopresti, Tony Lorenz, Andrew J LoVuolo, David W. Mack, Steven Mangold, Bill Marimon, Laura Martin, Ron Marz, Jose Marzan Jr., James Mason, David G. McDaniel, Garry W. McKee II, Bob McLeod, Angel Medina, Dave Meikis, Jerry Mendoza, Jim Mooney, Paul Monsky, Stanley Morrison, Drew Moss, Martin Nodell, Phil Noto, John Nunnemacher, James O'Barr, Darrell O'Riley, Victoria Ortone, Matt Page, Jimmy Palmiotti, Pat Parnell, Robert Parzek, Paul Pelletier, Jason Peltz, Andrew Pepoy, Mike Perkins, Brandon Peterson, Adrian 'Asia' Petty, Justin Ponsor, Michael 'Axebone' Potter, Brian Pulido, Brian Reber, Robert Richardson, Emily Rigelsky, James Ritchey, III, Ariel Rivero, Darick Robertson, Tone Rodriguez, Matt Ryan, Aaron Sacharow, Nigel Sade, Steven Sanchez, Alex Saviuk, Jason Schnabel, Bart Sears, Kelsey Shannon, Walter Simonson, Lon Smart, Andy Smith, Jason Sobol, Sherrie Spencer, Arne Starr, Brian Stelfreeze, John Stevens, Karl Story, Josh Sullivan, Shawn Surface, Craig Thompson, Bryan "Kaiser" Tillman, Gary Timleck, Michael Torrence, George Tuska, Ethan Van Sciver, Matt Vazquez, Dexter Vines, Jason Walker, Adam Wallenta, Danny Waters, Nathan Wiedemer, Matt Wieman, Blake Wilkie, Tracy Yardley, Skottie Young; Cancelled Brian Michael Bendis, John Cassaday, Warwick Davis, Brian Downey, Nalini Krishan, Jason Mewes, Xenia Seeberg, Kevin Smith, Craig Thompson, Ron Thornton, Patricia Zentilli | |
| February 25–27, 2005 | West Concourse Hall D2 | Actors: Melody Anderson, Douglas H. Arthurs, Julie Benz, Jackson Bostwick, Jeff Breslauer, Thom Christopher, Devin Devasquez, Lou Ferrigno, Gil Gerard, Erin Gray, Richard Hatch, Richard Herd, Sam Jones, Sam Jones III, John Kassir, Mercedes McNab, Debbie Rochon, Felix Silla, Michael Bailey Smith Other listed guests: Voice actors / Sandy Fox, Lex Lang, George Lowe; Book authors / Peter S. Beagle; Musicians / Psycho le Cému; Comic creators / Manuel Aguilera, Luis Amado, Robert Atkins, Nicc Balce, Adam Beranek, Christian Beranek, Jerry Beck, Allen Bellman, Mike Bielaczyc, Jamie Biggs, Steve Bird, Rene Blanco, Tony Bledsoe, Justin Bleep, Bret Blevins, Marty Blevins, Mike Bocianowski, Tye Bourdony, Michael Bramson, Dan Brereton, Michael Buckley, Tim Buckley, James 'Bukshot' Bukaskus, Chris Burke, Mitch Byrd, David Campiti, Sergio Cariello, Gil Carlo, Pat Carlucci, Tommy Castillo, Keith Champagne, Brian Clevinger, Gene Colan, Brian Colin, Steve Conley, Joseph Conrad, Will Conrad, Daniel Cooney, Jinky Coronado, Ed Coutts, Katherine Croft, Terry Cronin, Michael D'Ambrosio, Wes Danielson, Mike Deodato, Dave DeVries, Emilio Diaz, Chuck Dixon, Tai Do, Joey Donovan, Frank Dowler, DRE, Angela Duplis, David Durica, John Fagard, Joe Fauvel, Scott Fensterer, Frank Feschino Jr., Glenda Finkelstein, Derrick Fish, G.W. Fisher, Tom Fleming, Thomas Florimonte, Jason Flowers, Jason Franks, John Fuld, Sam Gaffin, Joe Gallagher, John Gallagher, Greg Gatlin, Drew Geraci, Michael T. Gilbert, Dick Giordano, Michael Goodman, Robert Granito, Randy Green, Sanford B. Greene, Barry Gregory, Jenni Gregory, Raven Gregory, Chasen S. Grieshop, Linda Grucza, Leo Grutman, Jeff Hall, Russell Hall, Jessie "Cadre" Hansen, Chris Harden, Andrew Hennessey, Mark Henry, Anthony Hightower, Dave Horlick, Greg Horn, Josh Howard, Adam Hughes, Rob Hunter, Ben Hunzeker, Mitch Hyman, Miguel Insignares, Austin Janowsky, Jennifer Janviere, Phil Jimenez, Rob Jones, Amano Jyaku, Rick Ketcham, Barbara Kesel, Tyler Kirkman, Rich Koslowski, Cory Evan Laub, Katherine Leis, Jay Leisten, Chris "Cannonball" Lesley, Chris Lie, Ellen Linder, Bob Lizek, Charles Lopez, Aaron Lopresti, Tony Lorenz, Andrew J. LoVuolo, Carl Lundgren, James E. Lyle, Mike Manley, James Mason, Bill Marimon, Pat Martin, Ron Marz, Jose Marzan, James Mason, Steve Mangold, David McDaniel, Dove McHargue, G.W. McKee II, Austin McKinley, Bob McLeod, Steve McNiven, Angel Medina, Mark Mekkes, Paul Monsky, Jim Mooney, Monte Moore, Chris Moreno, Stanley Morrison, Rex Mundi, Nakanari, Stephan Nilson, Talia O'Neal, Darrell O'Riley, Michael Avon Oeming, Scott Parker, Bob Parzek, Jr., Douglas Pasziewicz, Paul Pelletier, Jason Peltz, George Perez, Mike Perkins, Brandon Peterson, Joe Quesada, Buddy Prince, Brian Pulido, Nate Ramboldt, Scott Ramsoomair, Khary Randolph, Joshua Raynack, Robert Charles Richardson, Emily Rigelsky, Tim Riley, David A. Rivera, Ariel Rivero, Tone Rodriguez, Lucio Ruiz, Andy Runton, Nigel Sade, Steve Sanchez, Harold Saville, Alex Saviuk, Stuart Sayger, Heather Scott, Justin Scott, Brian Shearer, Marlin Shoop, Andy Smith, Mark Sparacio, Sherrie Spencer, Jason Sobal, Taki Soma, Arne Starr, Josh Sullivan, Shawn Surface, Paula Tabor, Randy Taylor, Alex Teston, Roy Thomas, Gregory N Thompson, Bryan “Kaiser” Tillman, Greg Titus, Jody Tonn, Wilson Tortosa, Carmen Treffiletti, Billy Tucci, George Tuska, Ethan Van Sciver, Mayleen Vega, Tim Vigil, Paul Vincenti, Mark Waid, Shaun Ward, Andy Warner, Danny B. Waters, Robert Wawrzyniak, Nathan Weidemer, Phillip Willis, Marv Wolfman, John Wycough, Xzanthia, Tracy Yardly, Skottie Young, Thom Zahler | 22,000 attendees |
| February 24–26, 2006 | West Concourse Hall D | Actors: Tony Amendola, Steve Bacic, Julie Benz, Jason Carter, Cleopatra, Alexis Cruz, Mira Furlan, John Kassir, Lloyd Kaufman, Clare Kramer, Cirroc Lofton, Mark Lutz, Chris Rankin, John Schneider, Tracy Scoggins, Marina Sirtis, Arne Starr, Brinke Stevens, Cathy St George, Jamie Yeates Other listed guests: Voice actors / Chris Bevins, Jeff Breslauer, George Lowe, Mike McFarland, Scott McNeill, Billy West; Musicians / Emerald Rose; Book authors / Bob Andelman; Comic creators / Dionysios Adelinis, Manuel Aguilera, Luis Amado, Scott Ethan Ambruson, James “Bukshot” Bukauskas, John Beatty, Jerry Beck, Jason Becker, Marty Blevins, Tony Bledsoe, Jennie Breeden, Mark Brooks, Sal Buscema, J. Chris Campbell, Ariel Rivero Capote, Monica Cappiello, Nic Carcieri, Nick Cardy, Sergio Cariello, Pat Carlucci, Tommy Castillo, Howard Chaykin, Jimmy Cheung, Mike Choi, Amanda Conner, Mike Conrad, Eric Cooper, Tracy Cornett, Ed Coutts, Terry Cronin, R. Katherine Croft, Dennis Culver, Mike D’Ambrosio, Corey “Roc Bottom” Davis, Chuck Dixon, Matt Doucette, Travis Earls, Steve Epting, Al Feldstein, Scott Fenster, Ozzy Fernandez, Glenda C. Finklestein, GW Fisher, Derrick Fish, Tom Fleming, Jason Flowers, Jason Franks, Drew Geraci, Dick Giordano, Kermit Gonzalez, Robert Granito, Tamara Gray, Randy Green, Barry Gregory, Groovi Grevelli, Christopher Alan Harden, Jesse “Cadre” Hansen, Marc Hammond, Mark Henry, Jessica ‘Pooka’ Herrera, Derek Holland, Greg Hopkins, Adam Hughes, Rob Hunter, Andrew Hurst, Crystal Irvine, John ‘Jaxx’ Jackman, John Jay Jacobs, Rob Jones, Amano Jyaku, Barbara Kesel, Rich Koslowski, Holland King, Robert Kraus, Greg Land, Cory Evan Laub, Bob Layton, Chris Leidenfrost, Jay Leisten, Chris “Cannonball” Lesley, Chris Lie, Andrew Lovoulo, Jonathan Luna, Joshua Luna, James E. Lyle, Chuck Majewski, Steven Mangold, Pablo Marcos, Bill Marimon, Dash Martin, Laura Martin, Pat Martin, Jose Marzan, Jr., David McDaniel, Dove McHargue, Garry McKee II, Bob McLeod, Mark Mekkes, Ricky Midence, Adam Milicevic, Steve Mindykowski, Brian Mitchell, Paul Monsky, Claudia Montealegre, Chris Moreno, Stanley Morrison, Dave Nestler, Martin Nodell, Phil Noto, Darrel O'Riley, Jimmy Palmiotti, Roland Paris, Pat Parnell, Billy Dallas Patton, Joe Pekar, Jason Peltz, Mark Pennington, George Perez, Mike Perkins, Brandon Peterson, Jim Pike, Jose Prendes, Brian Pulido, CJ Randall, Joshua Raynack, Robert Rhine, Emily Rigelsky, Charles Richardson, Alberto Ruiz, Andy Runton, Steven Sanchez, Alex Saviuk, Stuart Sayger, Brian Shearer, Mark Simon, Christian Slade, Joshua Smeaton, Andy Smith, Jason Sobol, Candido Soto, Sherri Spencer, Josh Sullivan, Paula Tabor, Brian Tillman, Tim Townsend, Chris Tsuda, Billy Tucci, George Tuska, Ethan Van Sciver, Robert Venditti, Paul Vincenti, Greg Vondruska, Jason Walker, Nara Walker, Shaun Ward, Danny Waters, Robert Wawrzyniak, Nathan Wiedemer, Mike Wieringo, Chris Wisnia, Thom Zahler; Cancelled Michael Lark, Chris Rankin, Tanya Roberts, Sean Schemmel | |
| February 16–18, 2007 | West Concourse Hall C | Actors: Sean Astin, Jamie Bamber, Brian Downey, Gigi Edgley, Lou Ferrigno, David Franklin, Mark Goddard, David Hedison, Virginia Hey, Lloyd Kaufman, Margot Kidder, Bob May, Mary McDonnell, Michael McManus, Noel Neill, Wayne Pygram, Efren Ramirez, Xenia Seeberg, Kevin Sorbo, Arne Starr, Cathy St. George, Vergil, Michael Winslow Other listed guests: Voice actors / Chris Bevins, John Burgmeier, Sandy Fox, Taliesin Jaffe, Lex Lang, Vic Mignogna, Carrie Savage; Musicians / Aurelio Voltaire; Comic creators / Josh Abegglen, Manuel Aguilera, Luis Amado, Scott Ambruson, Ken Anthony II, Lindsay Archer, Franco Aureliani, Peri Baker-Horner, A.Michael Ball, Arthur Ball, Art Baltazar, Chris Barnes, Jonathan Bass, Moose Baumann, Gina Biggs, Monique Blaize, Kailyn Boehm, Bob Bolling, Nate Bowden, Kenneth Branch, Jeffrey Breslauer, Jennie Breeden, Lee Bretschneider, Tye Bourdony, Nate Bowden, Charlie Brown, James Bukauskas, Avery Butterworth, Mitch Byrd, Monica Cappiello, Nic Carcieri, Mike Carey, Sergio Cariello, Pat Carlucci, R. Carmine, Joel Carroll, Greg Carter, Tommy Castillo, Barbara Chapman, Shannon B.Chenoweth, Jim Cheung, Christopher Churchill, Lindsay Cibos, Julie Collins, Steve Conley, Amanda Conner, Mike Conrad, Darwyn Cooke, Tracy Cornett, Dana Corrigan, Terry Cronin, Yumi Cutter, Chris Darden, Corey “Roc Bottom” Davis, Larissa Davis, Chuck Dixon, Michael Duron, Travis Earls, Ivonne Falcón, Ozzy Fernandez, David Finch, Glenda Finkelstein, Derrick Fish, G.W. Fisher, Tom Fleming, Thomas Florimonte, Francesco Francavilla, Angel Fuentes, Sam Gafford, Sean “Cheeks” Galloway, Damon Gentry, Drew Geraci, Dick Giordano, Bill Goettel, Sarah Goodreau, Rob Granito, Joshua Greathouse, Barry Gregory, Jenni Gregory, Mario Gully, Dan Hale, Jesse “Cadre” Hansen, Mark Henry, Rob Hicks, Richard Hodges, Erik Hodson, Anthony Hightower, Derek Holland, Morry Hollowell, Karen Hoo, Nicholas Hoo, Greg Horn, Adam Hughes, Rob Hunter, Mitch Hyman, Crystal Irvine, Austin Janowsky, J.L. Johnsen, Christina Johnson, J. G. Jones, Amano Jyaku, Peter Kaplan, Jeffrey Kaufman, Steve Keeter, Barbara Kesel, Joe Ketterer, Greg Kirkpatrick, Rick Koslowski, Adam Kubert, Michael Laico, Cory Laub, Christopher Ledford, Comfort Love, Andrew LoVuolo, James E. Lyle, Mike Maihack, Steven Mangold, Carlos M. Mangual, Christopher March, Dash Martin, Pat Martin, Jose Marzan, Jeremy Mauney, Philip McCall II, Michael McCurdy, David McDaniel, Emily McGuiness, Garry McKee II, Steve McNiven, Mark Meekes, Jonboy Meyers, Adam Milicevic, Steve Mindykowski, Brian Mitchell, Helder Moreira, Chris Moreno, Stanley Morrison, Cayce Moyer, Andy Nelson, Dave Nestler, Phil Noto, Mike Okamato, Jennifer Oliver, Darrell O'Riley, Rhiannon A. Owens, Jimmy Palmiotti, Danny Paris, Pat Parnell, Joe Pekar, George Pérez, Mike Perkins, Brandon Peterson, Elizabeth Phillips, Jim Pike, Sara “Selan” Pike, Caleb Prochnow, Steven Prouse, Brian Pulido, Lauren Reed, Rob Richardson, Emily Rigelsky, Desiree Rincon, David Rivera, Ariel Rivero, Allen S. Robst, Mileska M. Rodriguez, Alberto Ruiz, Nigel Sade, Stan Sakai, Ronald Salas, Alex Saviuk, Stuart Sayger, Ed Siemienkowicz, J. Shamblin, Brian Shearer, Andy Smith, Jason Sobol, Sherri Spencer, Jerry Stanford, Justin Stanley, Cyn Starnes, Kitsune Steele, Josh Sullivan, Paula Tabor, Dexter Taylor, Bryan Tillman, Mike Torrance, Tim Townsend, Billy Tucci, Ethan Van Sciver, Paul Vincenti, Greg Vondruska, Jason Walker, “Nara” Naresea Walker, Shaun Ward, Danny Waters, Robert Wawrzyniak, John Wheeler, Nathan Wiedemer, Jarrett B. Williams, Rick Winward, Adam Withers, Marc Wolfe, Tracy Yardley, Thom Zahler; Cancelled Allan Heinberg, June Lockhart, Geoff Johns | |
| March 7–9, 2008 | South Concourse Hall B | Actors: Steve Bacic, Leah Cairns, Trish Cleveland, Jarrett Crippen, Adam Danoff, Erica Durance, Gil Gerard, Mark Goddard, Erin Gray, Lloyd Kaufman, Gail Kim, Peter Mayhew, Cindy Morgan, Dylan Neal, Noel Neill, Jack O'Halloran, Adrian Pasdar, Pete Postiglione, Jon Provost, Jennifer Rhodes, Kyle Schmid, Mark Sheppard, William Morgan Sheppard, Marc Singer, Arne Starr, Kristy Swanson, Adrienne Wilkinson, Dan Williams, Nell Wilson Other listed guests: Voice actors / Caitlin Glass, Neil Kaplan, George Lowe, Cynthia Martinez, Vic Mignogna; Musicians / Aurelio Voltaire; Comic creators / Maite Acosta, Manuel Aguilera, Scott Ethan Ambruson, Ken Anthony, Nick Arganbright, Arthur Ball, Jinnifer Barrentine, John Beatty, Jason Becker, Rich Bernatovech, Gina Biggs, Andrew Black, Josh Blaylock, Tony Bledsoe, Daniel Boyd, Jennie Breeden, Lee Bretschneider, James “Bukshot” Bukauskas, Lee Camara, Peter Caravette, Nic Carcieri, Sergio Cariello, Pat Carlucci, Randy Carmine, Joe Carroll, Greg Carter, Tommy Castillo, Crystal Cecil, Barbara Chapman, Hayley Chapman, Andrew Charipar, Shannon Chenoweth, Jim Cheung, Christopher Churchill, Michael Churchill, Lindsay Cibos, Tiffany Ciper, Brian Clevinger, Amanda Conner, Mike Conrad, Darwyn Cooke, Dan Cooley, Eric Cooper, G. David Cooper, Tracy Cornett, Dana Corrigan, Andrew Cosson, Ed Coutts, Kyle Cross, James Dailey, Jeremy Dale, Chris Dame, Christopher Darden, Michael Darling, Deanna Davoli, Monica Delgado, Chuck Dixon, Derec Donovan, Robert Doria, David Doub, Marc Draven, Travis Earls, Erick Erickson, Jamie Fay, Ozzy Fernandez, Nathan Ferree, David Finch, Zack Finfrock, Derrick Fish, GW Fisher, Tom Fleming, Gary Friedrich, Angel Fuentes, Scott Gallatin, Tanya Gadsden, Peter Gandia, Carlos Garcia, Drew Geraci, Ransom Getty, Casey Gibson, Lionel Gill, Dick Giordano, Porfiria Girgis, Michael Golden, Gene Gonzales, Michelle Gonzalez, Robert Granito, Joshua Greathouse, KC Green, Sanford Green, Mario Gully, Eric Wolfe Hanson, Carrie Hawks, Kevin Hayman, Jamie Hendrix, Matt Herms, Greg Hettinger, Jared Hodges, LaTwan Holland, Amy Hollen, Greg Horn, Mitch Hyman, Crystal Irvine, Damon James, Chad Jenkins, Cyan Jenkins, Barbara Jensen, Dave Johnson, Erik Jones, Amano Jyaku, Amanda Kahl, Jeff Kaufman, Barbara Kesel, Jennifer Kilburn, Adrian S. King, Randy “Rantz” Kintz, Robert A. Kraus, Adam Kubert, Karl Kuras, Cory Evan Laub, Christopher Ledford, Sherline Leem, Chris Leidenfrost, “Louie D.” Llense, Jonathan Lewis, Jason Li, Joe Linsner, Comfort Love, Andrew Lovuolo, Javier Lugo, James Lyle, Mike Maihack, Steven Mangold, Carlos Mangual, Dash Martin, Laura Martin, Jose Marzan Jr., Nathan Massengill, Jeremy Mauney, Denise McCabe, Philip McCall II, Greg McConnell, Garry McKee II, Mark McKenna, Bob McLeod, Steve McNiven, Bill Meiggs, Mark Mekkes, Jim Melvin, Ken Meyer, Jr., Brian Mitchell, Paul Monsky, Chris Moreno, Stanley Morrison, George Moss, Ari Muñoz, Dee Muñoz, Rudy Nebres, Andy Nelson, David Nestler, Stephan Nilson, Alex Niño, Phil Noto, Darrell O'Riley, Rhiannon A. Owens, Sakura O2, Jimmy Palmiotti, Mia Paluzzi, Pat Parnell, Paul Pelletier, Jason Peltz, Mike Perkins, Brandon Peterson, Justin Peterson, Brett Pinson, Anna Polonsky, Caleb Prochnow, Steven Prouse, Joe Quesada, Matt Rainwater, Matthew Razzano, Rob Richardson, David A. Rivera, Enrique O. Rivera, Marcus A. Rivera, Mileska Rodriguez, Tone Rodriguez, John Romita Jr., Ed Ryzowski, Nigel Sade, Stan Sakai, Ronald Salas, Alexandria Sandlin, Alex Saviuk, Enrique “Zeke” Savory Jr., Stuart Sayger, Jennifer Scanlon, Heather Scott, Stephany Scott, Steve Scott, Sean Shaw, JT Shea, Brian Shearer, Kate Sherron, Scotty Shoemaker, Ed Siemienkowicz, Joshua Smeaton, David Stanworth, C. Michael Steele, Kitsune Steele, Jon Sugrue, Arthur Suydam, Trish Tatman, Daniel Taylor, Mark Texeira, Shayne Thames, Laurie Thomas, Bryan Tillman, Miller Timmons, Mike Torrance, Wilfredo Torres, Layne Toth, Peri Toth, Tim Townsend, Herb Trimpe, William Tucci, Ethan Van Sciver, Mayleen Vega, Tim Vigil, Paul Vincenti, Dexter Vines, Greg Vondruska, Mark Waid, Jason Walker, Nara N. Elizabeth Walker, Matt Walters, Danny Waters, Robert Wawrzyniak, Daniel Way, John Wheeler, Kathryn Whidden, Chad White, Rick Winward, Renee Witterstaetter, Marc Wolfe, David K. Wong, Eric Woodard, Scott Woodward, Nathan Wiedemer, Jarrett Williams, Adam Withers, Maryanne Wright, Thom Zahler, Scott Zitta; Cancelled Matthew Atherton, Robin Curtis, Tanya Huff, June Lockhart | First in North/South concourse |
| February 27–March 1, 2009 | West Concourse Hall D | Actors: Melody Anderson, Dirk Benedict, Traci Brooks, James Callis, Luciana Carro, Gareth David-Lloyd, Darcy DeMoss, Ami Dolenz, Micky Dolenz, Lou Ferrigno, Jennifer Halley, James Hampton, Tricia Helfer, Christy Hemme, Alaina Huffman, Herbert Jefferson, Jr., Charlotte Kemp, Margot Kidder, Richard LeParmentier, Anne Lockhart, Peter Mayhew, Cindy Morgan, Phillip Morris, Aaron Pabon, Michael Papajohn, Felix Silla, Al Snow, Arne Starr, Mia St. John, Cathy St.George Other listed guests: Voice actors / Colleen Clinkenbeard, Aaron Dismuke, Caitlin Glass, Vic Mignogna; Book Authors / Peter Beagle, Shane Moore; Musicians / Alien Warrior Comedian, Emerald Rose, Phoenicia; Comic creators / John Abatz, Alison Acton, Manuel Aguilera, Nick Arganbright, Scott Ambruson, Brian Anderson, Ken Anthony II, Daniel Araya, Lindsay Archer, Robert Atkins, Kristal Babich, Andrew Batog, Pat Batton, William Beaderstadt, John Beatty, Jasmine Becket-Griffith, Tony Bedard, Andrea M. Bell, Rich Bernatovech, Monique Blaize, Joe Bluhm, Dan Boyd, Kenneth Branch, Jennie Breeden, Jeff Brennan, Pat Broderick, James “Bukshot” Bukauskas, Bucky, Steven Butler, Mitch Byrd, Lee Camara, J Chris Campbell, Sergio Cariello, Pat Carlucci, Randall R. Carmine, Joel Carrol, Tommy Castillo, Barbara Chapman, Andrew Charipar, Adonis E. Charles, Echo Chernik, Jim Cheung, Frank Cho, Lindsay Cibos, Tiffany Ciper, Chris Claremont, Amanda Conner, Darwyn Cooke, Cesar Cordero, Wayne Cordova, Tracy L. Cornett, Terry Cronin, Brittany Cruz, Michael D’Ambrosio, Jeremy Dale, Christopher Darden, Deanna Davoli, Nelson DeCastro, Monica Delgado, Dan Didio, Chuck Dixon, Derec Donovan, Kenny Durkin, Travis Earls, Robin Edwards, Larry Elmore, Egg Embry, Erick Erickson, Joel Estrada, Jamie Fay, Al Feldstein, Ben Filipiak, Glenda Finkelstein, Derrick Fish, GW Fisher, Rene Florimonte, Thomas Florimonte, Jr., Mike Foss, Chandra Free, Angel Fuentes, Scott Gallatin, Drew Geraci, Dick Giordano, Gaby Gonzalez, Rob Granito, Tamara Gray, Randy Green, KC Green, Barry Gregory, Chloe Gregory, Jenni Gregory, Chasen Grieshop, Meriana Guerra, Chris Hamer, Nik Havert, Clayton Henry, Elvin A. Hernandez, Sarah Herrin, Jared Hodges, Morry J. Hollowell , Chris Houtchen, Adam Hughes, Rob Hunter, Aric Hutfles, Mitch Hyman, Austin Janowsky, Chad Jenkins, Cyan Jenkins, Rob Jones, Dan Jurgens, Amano Jyaku, Amanda Kahl, Barbara Kesel, Rick Ketcham, David King, Michael Kingston, Matthew Kirkland, Robert A. Kraus, Karl Kuras, Greg Land, Greg LaRocque, Cory Evan Laub, Christopher Ledford, Kevin Leen, Chris Leidenfrost, Jerald Lewis, Tony Lorenz, Michael Loria, Comfort Love, Andrew LoVuolo, Javier Lugo, Christine Lupo, James Lyle, Mike Maihack, Steven Mangold, Carlos M. Mangual, Daniel Mann, Pablo Marcos, Dash Martin, Ron Marz, Jose Marzan, Jr., Jeremy Mauney, Mike Maydak, Philip Lee McCall II, Michael McElroy, Sean McHugh, Gary McKee II, Bob McLeod, Steve McNiven, Mark Mekkes, Brian Canfield Mitchell, Paul Monsky, Mark Morales, Stanley Morrison, George Moss, Doug Murray, Alex Ness, Rose Nightshade, Ashley Oliva, Darrell O'Riley, Rhiannon Owens, Pasquale V. Palazzolo, Jimmy Palmiotti, Mia Paluzzi, Danny Paris, Patrick Thomas Parnell, Joe Pekar, Paul Pelletier, George Perez, Mike Perkins, Brandon Peterson, Martin T. Pierro, Sara Pike, Brett Pinson, Thitaree Pongpluempitichai, Brian Pulido, Anthony Racanelli, Humberto Ramos, Rodney Ramos, Graven Ravenwolf, Rob Rhine, Ray Richardson, Robert Richardson, David Rivera, Enrique O. Rivera, Marcus Rivera, Lady Saiyuki, Ron Salas, Steven Sanchez, Alex Saviuk, Kari Schultz, Dave Shabet, J.T. Shea, Brian Shearer, Scotty Shoemaker, Kerry Shyver, Karl Slominski, Joshua Smeaton, Bob Smeets, Andy Smith, Cory Smith, Jason Sobol, Wayne Spencer, Kitsune Steele, Rinaldo Stephens, William Stout, Dirk Strangely, Jonathan Stuart, Arthur Suydam, Shayne Thames, Laurie L. Thomas, Bryan “Kaiser” Tillman, Crystal Tillman, Wilfredo Torres, Layne Toth, Peri Toth, Tim Townsend, Billy Tucci, Ethan Van Sciver, Demetrius Veasy, Alain Viesca, Paul Vincenti, Shannon Vokes, Greg Vondruska, Mark Waid, Jason Walker, Jennifer H. Walker, Deleon Walters, Sam Warren, Danny Waters, Robert Wawrzyniak, Nathan Wiedemer, Amy Williams, Greg “Dark One” Williams, Jarrett Williams, Adam Withers, John Wycough, Tracy Yardley, Kelly Yates, Thom Zahler; Cancelled Beau Bridges, Al Feldstein, Richard Hatch, Alaina Huffman, Laura Vandervoort | 32,000 attendees |
| August 22–23, 2009 | West Concourse Hall E1 | Actors: Amber Benson, Adam Busch, Charisma Carpenter, Emma Caulfield, Dorian Gregory, Jackie Haas, Hannah Hindi, Hillary Hindi, The Kat, Lisa Loring, Shelly Martinez, Sylvester McCoy, Tarah Paige, Terri Runnels, Felix Silla, Arne Starr, SoCal Val, Sean Waltman Other listed guests: Voice actors / Vic Mignogna; Musicians / Phoenicia, Aurelio Voltaire; Comic creators / Tony Bedard, Sergio Cariello, Jim Cheung, Amanda Conner, Darwyn Cooke, Terry Cronin, Chuck Dixon, Drew Geraci, Dick Giordano, Greg Horn, Casey Jones, Greg Land, Alvin Lee, Phil Noto, Jimmy Palmiotti, Jeff Parker, Mike Perkins, Brandon Peterson, Steve Scott, Christian Slade, Amanda Stevens, Billy Tan, Tim Townsend, Renee Witterstaetter; Cancelled Peter Facinelli, Rachelle Lefevre, Michael Welch | "mini-MegaCon" |

=== 2010s ===
==== Pre-Informa ====
| Dates | Building | Official guests | Notes |
|---|---|---|---|
| March 12–14, 2010 | West Concourse Hall D | Actors: Maria de Aragon, Jeremy Bulloch, Levar Burton, Ellen Dubin, Richard Hatch, Virginia Hey, James Hong, Lloyd Kaufman, John De Lancie, Jerry "The King" Lawler, Kristanna Loken, Peter Mayhew, Nichelle Nichols, Ray Park, Robert Picardo, Brent Spiner, Arne Starr, Lea Thompson, Russell Tovey, SoCal Val, Claudia Wells, Billy Dee Williams Other listed guests: Voice actors / David Acord, Dave Barclay, Darrel Guilbeau, Chuck Huber, Neil Kaplan, Cherami Leigh, Sonny Strait, Matthew Wood; Music performers / Phoenicia; Comic creators / Tony Bedard, Joe Benitez, Jim Calafiore, Eric Canete, Sergio Cariello, Jim Cheung, Frank Cho, Mike Choi, Amanda Conner, Darwyn Cooke, Terry Cronin, Jeremy Dale, Nelson DeCastro, Chuck Dixon, Dave Dorman, Dick Giordano, Rob Granito, Justin Gray, Greg Horn, Adam Hughes, Rob Hunter, Georges Jeanty, Casey Jones, Joe Jusko, Barbara Kesel, Greg Land, Alvin Lee, Laura Martin, Mark McKenna, Mike McKone, Graham Nolan, Phil Noto, Sonia Oback, Jimmy Palmiotti, Dan Parent, Paul Pelletier, George Perez, Mike Perkins, Stephen Perry, Brandon Peterson, Brian Pulido, Don Rosa, Stephane Roux, Christian Slade, Andy Smith, Brian Stelfreeze, Amanda Stevens, Chris Stevens, Tim Townsend, Billy Tucci, Ethan Van Sciver, Dexter Vines, Marv Wolfman; Cancelled Olivier Coipel, Nicholas Courtney, Robb Demarest, Gig Edgley, Jonathan Frakes, Kevin Sorbo | 35,000 attendees |
| March 25–27, 2011 | West Concourse Hall D-E1 | Actors: Robin Curtis, Michael Dorn, Lou Ferrigno, Jonathan Frakes, Mira Furlan, Gil Gerard, Erin Gray, James Hampton, Herbert Jefferson Jr., Doug Jones, Clare Kramer, Anne Lockhart, James Marsters, Cindy Morgan, John Schneider, Matt Senreich, William Shatner, Marina Sirtis, Kevin Sorbo, Arne Starr, Jack Stauffer, SoCal Val, Zeb Wells Other listed guests: Voice actors / Colleen Clinkenbeard, Jamie Marchi, Vic Mignogna, Trina Nishimura; Music performers / Phoenicia; Comic creators / Allen Bellman, Nelson Blake, J. Scott Campbell, Sergio Cariello, Jim Cheung, Frank Cho, Amanda Conner, Darwyn Cooke, Terry Cronin, Jeremy Dale, Nelson DeCastro, Frank Fradella, Michael Golden, Morry Hollowell, Greg Horn, Rob Hunter, Geoff Johns, Reverend Dave Johnson, Joe Jusko, Stan Lee, Jay Leisten, Clay Mann, Ron Marz, Mike McKone, Terry Moore, Mark Morales, Phil Noto, Denny O'Neil, Jimmy Palmiotti, Dan Panosian, Dan Parent, George Perez, Mike Perkins, Brandon Peterson, Khoi Pham, Brian Pulido, Paolo Rivera, Kenneth Rocafort, Craig Rousseau, Tim Sale, Alex Saviuk, Steve Scott, Christian Slade, Arthur Suydam, Roy Thomas, Frank Tieri, Tim Townsend, Billy Tucci, Jim Valentino, Ethan Van Sciver, Mark Waid, Zeb Wells, Renee Witterstaetter; Cancelled Bruce Boxleitner, Joe Chin, Robb Demarest, Alan Ruscoe, Alison Skipper | 42,000 attendees |
| February 17–19, 2012 | West Concourse Halls D-E | Actors: David Anders, Bruce Boxleitner, Paul Bradford, Nicholas Brendon, Charisma Carpenter, Tia Carrere, Lauren Cohan, Brennan Elliot, Tom Felton, Stephen Furst, Peter Jurasik, Richard LeParmentier, Daniel Logan, Peter Mayhew, Eddie McClintock, Paul McGillion, Cindy Morgan, Joseph Morgan, Corin Nemec, Valerie Perrine, Robert Picardo, David Prowse, Saul Rubinek, Tim Russ, Matt Senreich, Michael Bailey Smith, Brent Spiner, Arne Starr, Scott Tepperman, Zeb Wells Other listed guests: Voice actors / Laura Bailey, Todd Haberkorn, Mark Meer, Vic Mignogna, Brina Palencia, Christopher Sabat, Travis Willingham; Music performers / Phoenicia, Frenchy and the Punk, Emerald Rose; Book authors / Aya Knight; Comic creators / Robert Atkins, Jeff Balke, Tony Bedard, Allen Bellman, Joe Brusha, Dennis Calero, J. Scott Campbell, Greg Capullo, Nick Cardy, Sergio Cariello, Frank Cho, Brian Clevinger, Amanda Conner, Darwyn Cooke, Terry Cronin, Jeremy Dale, Daxiong, Mike DeBalfo, Nelson DeCastro, Lar DeSouza, Dan DiDio, Chuck Dixon, Nathan Edmondson, David Finch, Paul Gulacy, Cully Hamner, Phil Hester, Greg Horn, Rob Hunter, Dan Jurgens, Barbara Kesel, Bob Layton, Stan Lee, Clay Mann, Pablo Marcos, Laura Martin, Sheldon Moldoff, Karl Moline, Graham Nolan, Phil Noto, Jimmy Palmiotti, Dan Parent, Paul Pelletier, George Perez, Mike Perkins, Brandon Peterson, Brian Pulido, Don Rosa, Stephane Roux, Tim Sale, Alex Saviuk, Bill Sienkiewicz, Christian Slade, Ryan Sohmer, Brian Stelfreeze, Karl Story, Arthur Suydam, Mark Texeira, Frank Tieri, Tim Townsend, Billy Tucci, Tim Vigil, Zeb Wells, Renee Witterstaetter, Tom Zahler; Cancelled Tony Amendola, Kate Mulgrew, Ethan Phillips | 51,000 attendees First time a separate hall, D1, is used for ticketing and entry que |
| March 15–17, 2013 | West Concourse Halls D-E-F | Actors: Paul Blake, Blixx, Paul Bradford, Jeremy Bulloch, Levar Burton, Dean Cain, Denise Crosby, Huggy Cub, John De Lancie, Michael Dorn, Ellen Dubin, Gigi Edgley, Lou Ferrigno, Jonathan Frakes, Johnny G, Morgan Gendel, James Hampton, Michael Hogan, Jersey Jess, Lloyd Kaufman, Michael Koske, Jimmy Mac, Gates McFadden, Meatball, Larry Nemecek, James Phelps, Oliver Phelps, David Prowse, Sampson, Marina Sirtis, Brent Spiner, Arne Starr, Daniel Stewart, Patrick Stewart, Sunshine, Tanaka, Scott Tepperman, Wil Wheaton Other listed guests: Voice actors / Lear Bunda, John DiMaggio, DC Douglas, Joel McDonald, Vic Mignogna, Tara Strong, Cristina Vee, Billy West; Music performers / Frenchy and the Punk; Book authors / Aya Knight; Comic creators / Jason Adams, Joel Adams, Josh Adams, Neal Adams, Robert Atkins, Michael Atiyeh, Mark Bagley, Jeff Balke, Allen Bellman, Craig Boldman, Pat Broderick, Sergio Cariello, Jim Cheung, Frank Cho, Mike Choi, Chris Claremont, Amanda Conner, Darwyn Cooke, Terry Cronin, Jeremy Dale, José Delbo, Chuck Dixon, Steve Epting, Francesco Francavilla, Travis Hill, Greg Horn, Adam Hughes, Rob Hunter, Georges Jeanty, Reverend Dave Johnson, Bob Layton, Clay Mann, Roland Mann, Jose Marzan, Mike McKone, Bob McLeod, Steve McNiven, Jorge Molina, Jimmy Palmiotti, Dan Panosian, Dan Parent, Paul Pelletier, George Perez, Mike Perkins, Whilce Portacio, Andy Price, Brian Pulido, Andrew Robinson, Alex Saviuk, Matteo Scalera, Gail Simone, Christian Slade, Doug Sneyd, Arthur Suydam, Frank Tieri, Tim Townsend, Billy Tucci, Ethan Van Sciver; Cancelled Danielle Harris, Michael Lark, Stan Lee, Ed McGuinness, Brandon Peterson, Mark Waid | 66,000 in attendance |
| March 21–23, 2014 | South Concourse | Actors: Aaron Ashmore, John Barrowman, Dirk Benedict, Manu Bennett, Ming Chen, Lauren Cohan, Gareth David-Lloyd, Eliza Dushku, Jason David Frank, John Glover, Burn Gorman, Danai Gurira, Richard Hatch, Jon Heder, Richard Horvitz, Herbert Jefferson, Jr., Bryan Johnson, Emily Kinney, Anne Lockhart, Allison Mack, James Marsters, Sonequa Martin-Green, Peter Mayhew, David Morrissey, Eve Myles, Rob Paulsen, Ron Perlman, Mike Reed, Michael Rosenbaum, Matthew Senreich, Arne Starr, Karl Urban, Laura Vandervoort, Wil Wheaton, Stephen Yeun, Mike Zapcic Other listed guests: Voice actors / Jim Cummings, Quinton Flynn, Grey DeLisle, Jennifer Hale, Tom Kane, Phil LaMarr, George Lowe, Vic Mignogna, Rob Paulsen, Tom Root, Zeb Wells; Music performers / Ghost of the Robot, The Ken Spivey Band; Book authors / Aya Knight; Comic creators / Joel Adams, Josh Adams, Neal Adams, Jeff Balke, George Beliard, Allen Bellman, Nick Bradshaw, Frank Brunner, Dennis Calero, J. Scott Campbell, Sergio Cariello, Jimmy Cheung, Amanda Conner, Daryne Cooke, Jeremy Dale, Nelson Faro DeCastro, Chuck Dixon, Holly Frazetta, David Finch, Michael Golden, Cully Hamner, Greg Horn, Steve Horton, Rob Hunter, Dan Jurgens, Adam Kubert, Russell Lissau, Greg Land, Stan Lee, Roland Mann, Laura Martin, Ron Marz, Mike Mayhew, Mike McKone, Digger T Mesch, Mike Miller, James O'Barr, Joshua Ortega, Jimmy Palmiotti, Dan Parent, George Perez, Mike Perkins, Brandon Peterson, Brian Pulido, Tom Root, Bart Sears, Bill Sienkiewicz, Mark Sparacio, J. David Spurlock, Carl Story, Arthur Suydam, Frank Tieri, Tim Townsend, Herb Trimpe, Billy Tucci, Ethan Van Sciver, Mark Waid, Renee Witterstaetter, Skottie Young | 80,000 attendees |
| April 10–12, 2015 | West Concourse Hall B-A3/4 | Actors: Robbie Amell, Adam Baldwin, Mark Boone Junior, Clifton Collins Jr., Tony Curran, Lou Ferrigno, Sean Patrick Flanery, Karen Gillan, Summer Glau, Jimmy Hart, Hulk Hogan, April Hunter, Alex Kingston, Danielle Panabaker, David Ramsey, Norman Reedus, David Della Rocco, Michael Rooker, Ryan Stratis, Alan Tudyk, Milo Ventimiglia Other listed guests: Voice actors / Troy Baker, Grey DeLisle, Jess Harnell, Tress MacNeille, Olivia Olson, Rob Paulsen, Jeremy Shada; Comic creators / Jeff Balke, John Beatty, George Beliard, Allen Bellman, Nick Bradshaw, Sergio Cariello, Sean Chen, Frank Cho, John Tyler Christopher, Amanda Conner, Katie Cook, Darwyn Cooke, Terry Cronin, Chuck Dixon, Glenda Finkelstein, Drew Geraci, Joe Harris, Greg Horn, Rob Hunter, Bob Layton, Alvin Lee, Stan Lee, Mike Lilly, Ed McGuinness, Jimmy Palmiotti, Dan Parent, George Perez, Mike Perkins, Andy Price, Brian Pulido, Tom Raney, Paolo Rivera, Alex Saviuk, Christian Slade, Andy Smith, Mark Sparacio, Frank Tieri, Tim Townsend, Billy Tucci, Ethan Van Sciver, Lee Weeks; Cancelled Stephen Amell, Katie Cassidy | 97,000 attendees |
| November 21–22, 2015 | West Concourse Hall C | Actors: Karen Allen, Billy Boyd, Ryan Hurst, Jason Isaacs, Sean Maher, James Marsters, Paul McGann, John Rhys-Davies Other listed guests: Comic creators / Amanda Conner, Cully Hamner, Rob Hunter, Jimmy Palmiotti, George Perez, Mike Perkins, Tim Townsend; Cancelled Sean Astin | "MegaCon Fan Days mini event" 12,000 attendees |

==== Four days and Tampa Bay ====
| Dates | Building | Official guests | Notes |
|---|---|---|---|
| May 26–29, 2016 | West Concourse Halls A-B | Actors: Curtis Armstrong, Hayley Atwell, John Barrowman, Jeremy Bulloch, Katie Cassidy, John Cusack, Anthony Daniels, Tom Felton, Vivica A. Fox, Jason David Frank, Michelle Gomez, Elden Henson, Jason Isaacs, Lennie James, Christopher Lloyd, Daniel Logan, Ralph Macchio, Jason Mewes, Nichelle Nichols, Tom Payne, James Phelps, Oliver Phelps, Billie Piper, James Remar, William Sadler, William Shatner, Kevin Smith, George Takei, Carlos Valdes, Burt Ward, Adam West, William Zabka Other listed guests: Voice actors / Colleen Clinkenbeard, Kevin Conroy, Bill Farmer, Todd Haberkorn, David Hayter, Ryo Horikawa, Maurice LaMarche, Jamie Marchi, Vic Mignogna, Trina Nishimura, Alan Oppenheimer, Monica Rial, Chris Sabat, Sean Schemmel, James Arnold Taylor, Eric Vale, Ming-Na Wen; Music performers / Caleb Hyles; Book authors / Holly Hudspeth, Dr. Marc Okrand; Comic creators / Arthur Adams, Joel Adams, Neil Adams, Brian Azzarello, Jeff Balke, John Beatty, Buzz, Greg Capullo, Joyce Chin, Amy Chu, Joe Corroney, Paris Cullins, Peter David, Jeff Dekal, Nick Filardi, David Finch, Meredith Finch, Matthew Fletcher, Agnes Garbowska, Andrew Gaska, Michael Golden, Tony Harris, Greg Horn, Adam Hughes, Rob Hunter, Mark Irwin, Austin Janowsky, Klaus Janson, Dave Johnson, Andy Kubert, Greg Land, Andy Lanning, Ken Lashley, Jae Lee, Stan Lee, Joe Madureira, Clay Mann, Roland Mann, Seth Mann, Jose Marzan Jr., David McElfatrick, Mike Mckone, Derek Miller, Frank Miller, Cary Nord, James O'Barr, Yanick Paquette, Dan Parent, Ramon Perez, Andy Price, Brian Pulido, Adam Riches, Andrew Robinson, Fernando Ruiz, Anthony Ruttgaizer, Mike Salcedo, James Sanders III, Alex Saviuk, Hoyt Silva, Gail Simone, Christian Slade, Allison Sohn, Jon Sommariva, Peter Steigerwald, Sorah Suhng, Frank Tieri, Billy Tucci, Chris Uminga, Larry Watts, Freddie Williams II, Renee Witterstaetter, Leinil Francis Yu, Mike Zeck, Chrissie Zullo; Cancelled Freema Agyeman, Jon Bernthal, Jenna Coleman, Mike Colter, Lena Headey, Tom Kenny, Cassandra Lee Morris, Norman Reedus, Bonnie Wright | First 4-day event. First to reach over 100,000 attendees |
| October 28–30, 2016 (Tampa Bay) | Tampa Convention Center East Hall | Actors: Levar Burton, Brett Dalton, Rick Danford, Robert J. Emery, Will Friedle, Krista Grotte, Lynne Hansen, Matthew Lewis, Graham McTavish, John Mocsary, Rosemary Orlando, Mitch Pileggi, Billie Piper, Glenn Register Sr., Wallace Shawn, Kevin Sorbo, Brent Spiner, Kevin Sussman, David Tennant, Verne Troyer, Henry Winkler Other listed guests: Voice actors / Linda Ballantyne, Steve Blum, Katie Griffin, Cassandra Lee Morris, Wallace Shawn; Book authors / Jeff Strand; Comic creators / Jeff Balke, Tony Bedard, Pat Broderick, Sergio Cariello, Matthew Clark, Jeff Dekal, José Delbo, Chuck Dixon, Evie Dunn, Martin Dunn, Elliot Fernandez, Dee Fish, Matt Haley, Steve Horton, Rob Hunter, Austin Janowsky, Greg Land, Rob Liefeld, Bob McLeod, Alan Medina, Stephan Nilson, Patrick Thomas Parnell, Mike Perkins, James Pruett, Adam Riches, Andrew Robinson, Liam Sharp, K. T. Smith, Ty Templeton, Jamie Tyndall, Tim Vigil; Cancelled Mark Bagley, Alex Kingston, Greg Rucka, Jeremy Shada, William Shatner, Karl Urban | debut of MegaCon Tampa Bay, 30,000+ attendees |
| May 25–28, 2017 (Orlando) | North/South Concourse Hall A, South B | Actors: Richard Dean Anderson, Catherine Bach, Barry Bostwick, Nicholas Brendon, Nell Campbell, Tom Cavanaugh, Cyndi Crotts, Tim Curry, Jason Daly, Rick Danford, Felicia Day, Eliza Dushku, Elyes Gabel, William Grefe, Shandi Hampton, Hannah Hindi, Hillary Hindi, Famke Janssen, Matthew Lewis, Caity Lotz, Kyle Marlett, James Marsters, Robert Massetti, Gaten Matarazzo, Dave McElfatrick, Caleb McLaughlin, Meat Loaf, Danielle Panabaker, Ray Park, Patricia Quinn, Matt Reynolds, Jeri Ryan, Aaron Sagers, John Schneider, Ian Somerhalder, Brent Spiner, Gina Torres, Joel Watson, Spencer Wilding, Tom Wilson, Justin Woods-Robinson, Tom Wopat Other listed guests: Voice actors / Andrea Baker, Troy Baker, Linda Ballantyne, Christopher Daniel Barnes, Irene Bedard, Rodger Bumpass, Colleen Clinkenbeard, Jill Frappier, Katie Griffin, Jennifer Hale, Ali Hillis, Linda Larkin, Jamie Marchi, Charles Martinet, Mike McFarland, Amanda Miller, Nolan North, Paige O'Hara, Brina Palencia, Susan Roman, Billy West; Youtubers / RealTDragon; Music performers / Alice Cooper; Book authors / Owl Goingback; Comic creators / Jason Aaron, Marc Andreyko, Peter Bagge, Jeff Balke, Matt Banning, Eddy Barrows, Eric Basaldua, John Beatty, Nick Bradshaw, Danica Brine, Pat Broderick, Chris Campana, J. Scott Campbell, David Campiti, Greg Capullo, Sergio Cariello, Nen Chang, Howard Chaykin, Michael Cho, Chris Claremont, Matthew Clark, Amanda Conner, Katie Cook, Jinky Coronado, Joe Corroney, Jeff Dekal, José Delbo, Dan Didio, Amanda Diebert, Michael Dooney, Aly Dunn, Evie Dunn, Dee Fish, Tana Ford, The Franchize, Elliot Fernandez, José Luis García-López, Mitch Gerads, Sanford Greene, Adi Granov, Chad Hardin, Greg Horn, Steve Horton, Jody Houser, Adam Hughes, Rob Hunter, Austin Janowsky, Georges Jeanty, Phil Jimenez, Tom King, Adam Kubert, Gisele Lagace, Bob Layton, Stan Lee, Aaron Lopresti, Ant Lucia, Kevin Maguire, Clay Mann, Roland Mann, Jose Marzan Jr., John McCrea, Mike McKone, Dawn McTeigue, Jonboy Meyers, Jason Meents, Monte M. Moore, Paul Mounts, Jimmy Palmiotti, Dan Parent, Brent Peeples, Peng-Peng, George Perez, Mike Perkins, Benny Powell, Jenna Powell, Andy Price, Steven Pulawa, Brian Reber, Sara Richard, Adam Riches, Emily Rose Romano, JP Roth, Stephane Roux, Greg Rucka, Fernando Ruiz, Alex Santorelli, Alex Saviuk, Marlin Shoop, Gail Simone, Christian Slade, Dan Slott, Scott Snyder, Cat Staggs, Dominike Stanton, Dirk Strangely, Sorah Suhng, Frank Tieri, Joel Watson, Larry Watts, Tracy Yardley, Skottie Young, Jim Zub, Mike Zeck; Cancelled Kaare Andrews, Jenna Coleman, Charlie Cox, Arthur Darvill, John Feister, Juan Ferreyra, Nick Filardi, Sean Patrick Flanery, Tony Harris, Jeffrey Dean Morgan, Norman Reedus, David Della Rocco, James Sanders III, Allison Sohn, Bryan Turner, Mike Tyson, Paul Wesley | |
| Sept 29–Oct 1, 2017 (Tampa Bay) | Full Tampa Convention Center | Actors: Dr. Paul Bearer II, Walt Belcher, John Barrowman, Katie Cassidy, Ruth Connell, Rick Danford, Krista Grotte, Alex Kingston, James Marsters, Gaten Matarazzo, Caleb McLaughlin, Jason Mewes, John Mocsary, William Shatner, Kevin Smith, Ian Somerhalder, Ed Tucker Other listed guests: Voice actors / Zach Callison, Charlet Chung, Bill Farmer, Josh Grelle, Maurice LaMarche, Trina Nishimura, Chris Parson, Chris Sabat, William Salyers, Sean Schemmel, Veronica Taylor; Comic creators / Joel Adams, Neal Adams, Mark Bagley, Nate Bellegarde, Allen Bellman, Scott Blair, Tim Bradstreet, Pat Broderick, Buzz, Sergio Cariello, Derek Charm, Jeremy Clark, Amanda Conner, Chuck Dixon, Aly Dunn, Evie Dunn, Martin Dunn, Elliot Fernandez, Daniel Govar, Tom Grummett, Chad Hardin, Tini Howard, Corin Howell, Rob Hunter, Megan Hutchison, Austin Janowsky, Dave Johnson, Ryan Kincaid, Tony Kordos, Elise Kova, Greg Land, Bob Layton, Jae Lee, Stan Lee, Ron Marz, Ed McGuinness, Bill McKay, Jason Meents, Mostafa Moussa, Jimmy Palmiotti, James Pruett, Steve Pulawa, Adam Riches, Ruben Romero, Matt Santorelli, Jon Sommariva, Kyle Starks, Yale Stewart, Ty Templeton, Mike Texeira, Gus Vazquez, Freddie Williams II, JK Woodward, David Yardin; Cancelled Rachael MacFarlane, Mike Perkins, Paul Wesley | 45,000 attendees |
| May 24–27, 2018 (Orlando) | West Concourse Hall A-C | Actors: Amy Acker, Alexa Bliss, John Cena, Moises Chiullan, Charlie Cox, Michael Cudlitz, Rick Danford, William B. Davis, Keir Dullea, Cary Elwes, Joe Flanigan, Annabeth Gish, Jeff Goldblum, Amy Jo Johnson, Lucy Lawless, Gary Lockwood, Jason Mamoa, China McClain, Jennifer Morrison, Stephen Moyer, Shinsuke Nakamura, Devin Pike, Mitch Pileggi, Jeff Rector, Norman Reedus, Paul Reubens, Aaron Sagers, Chris Sarandon, Wallace Shawn, Jewel Staite, Brinke Stevens, Braun Strowman, Joonas Suotamo, Catherine Tate, Billy Dee Williams, Cress Williams, Nafessa Williams, Elijah Wood Other listed guests: Voice actors / Jodi Benson, Zach Callison, Christopher Daniel Barnes, Michaela Dietz, Susan Egan, Esetelle, Maile Flanagan, Deedee Magno, Vanessa Marshall, Mark Meer, Max Mittelman, Chris Sabat, Sean Schemmel, Jeremy Shada, Wallace Shawn, Fred Tatasciore, Veronica Taylor; Youtubers / WesTheEditor, Blaine Gibson, The Jovenshire, Lasercorn, Geoff Ramsey, Jon Risinger, Sohiniki, Gus Sorola, Tobuscus, TheSeanWardShow; Comic creators / Neal Adams, Jeff Balke, Joe Benitez, Pat Broderick, Ryan Browne, J. Scott Campbell, Greg Capullo, Nen Chang, Amanda Conner, Adelso Corona, Jeff Dekal, José Delbo, Johnny Desjardins, Chuck Dixon, Michael Dooney, Dave Dorman, Lee Ferguson, Elliott Fernandez, Nick Filardi, David Finch, Meredith Finch, Tana Ford, José Luis García-López, Tom Grummett, Matt Hawkins, Kyle Higgins, Greg Horn, Rob Hunter, Megan Hutchison, Jock, Tom King, Tyler Kirkham, Greg Kirkpatrick, Tony Kordos, Andy Kubert, Greg Land, Jim Lee, Rob Liefeld, Alex Maleev, Clay Mann, Alitha Martinez, Jose Marzan Jr., Francesco Mattina, Ed McGuinness, Bill McKay, Bob McLeod, Jason Meents, Dan Mendoza, Jonboy Meyers, James C. Mulligan, David Nakayama, Mike Norton, Yanick Paquette, Mog Park, Jimmy Palmiotti, Patrick Thomas Parnell, Steven Pulawa, Adam Riches, Richard Rivera, Fernando Ruiz, Matt Santorelli, Alex Saviuk, Joe Schnepp, Christian Slade, Scott Snyder, Brian Stelfreeze, Chris Stevens, Drew Struzan, Sorah Suhng, Frank Tieri, Peter Tomasi, Dan Veesenmeyer, Larry Watts, Joshua Williamson; Vendor partnered guests / Karan Ashley; Cancelled Renee O'Connor, Gregg Sulkin, Mark Texeira, Karl Urban | |
| Sept 21–23, 2018 (Tampa Bay) | Full Tampa Convention Center | Actors: Manu Bennett, Corbin Bernsen, Peter Capaldi, Jonny Cruz, John de Lancie, Michael Dorn, Jason David Frank, Summer Glau, Pearl Mackie, David Mazouz, Jeffrey Dean Morgan, Sean Pertwee, James Phelps, Oliver Phelps, Christian Serratos, Marina Sirtis Other listed guests: Voice actors / Kimberly Brooks, Ali Hillis, Josh Keaton, Rachael MacFarlane, Charles Martinet; Book authors / Deliah Dawson; Comic creators / Benjamin J Colón, Amanda Conner, Joe Giella, Todd Haberkorn, Greg Horn, Greg Kirkpatrick, Greg Land, Jonboy Meyers, Karl Moline, Jimmy Palmiotti, Steve Rude, H. Gorlitz Scott, Bob Wiacek; Cancelled Jennifer Hale, Christopher Lloyd, Vic Mignogna | Final MegaCon Tampa Bay event, 22,000 attendees |
| May 16–19, 2019 (Orlando) | North/South Concourse Hall A, South B | Actors: Stephen Amell, Sean Astin, John Barrowman, Mark Brooks, Lynda Carter, Mike Colter, Corey Feldman, Danielle Fishel, Dan Fogler, Michael J. Fox, Jason David Frank, Will Friedle, Tyler Hoechlin, Kristin Kreuk, Zachary Levi, Christopher Lloyd, Rose McIver, Lana Parrilla, Jason Patric, Lou Diamond Phillips, Ke Huy Quan, Michael Rosenbaum, Ben Savage, Mark Sheppard, Rider Strong, Kiefer Sutherland, David Tennant, Lea Thompson, James Tolkan, LeeAnna Vamp, Peter Weller, Tom Welling, Tom Wilson Other listed guests: Voice actors / Justin Briner, Clifford Chapin, Greg Cipes, Roger Clark, Peter Cullen, Jim Cummings, Barbara Dunkelman, Kara Eberle, Todd Haberkorn, Jess Harnell, Lindsay Jones, Maurice LaMarche, Alex McKenna, Chris Sabat, Gaku Space, Patricia Summersett, Cristina Vee, Frank Welker, Rob Wiethoff, Arryn Zech; Youtubers / Zach Clayton, Sofie Dossi, Dytto, Grav3yardgirl, Chloe Lukasiak, Tana Mongeau, Mario Selman, IAmZoie; Comic creators / Joel Adams, Neal Adams, Brian Azzarello, Jim Balent, John Beatty, Marguerite Bennett, Mark Brooks, Buzz, Greg Capullo, Joe Caramagna, Donny Cates, John Tyler Christopher, Carla Cohen, Adelso Corona, Clayton Crain, Mike Debalfo, Keith DeCandido, José Delbo, Elliot Fernandez, Holly G!, Agnes Garbowska, Mitch Gerads, Jenni Gregory, Francisco Herrera, Greg Horn, Megan Hutchison, Mark Irwin, Georges Jeanty, Tom King, Tyler Kirkham, Stanley Artgerm Lau, InHyuk Lee, Jae Lee, Doug Mahnke, Clay Mann, Pablo Marcos, Dawn McTeigue, Amy Mebberson, Alex Milne, Jorge Molina, Paul Mounts, Mostafa Moussa, James C. Mulligan, David Nakayama, Kael Ngu, Tao Nguyen, Cary Nord, Steve Orlando, Dan Panosian, Mog Park, Patrick Thomas Parnell, Lucio Parrillo, Mike Perkins, Alan Quah, Richard Rivera, Andrew Robinson, Sam de la Rosa, Matthew Rosenberg, Tim Sale, Matt Santorelli, Alex Saviuk, Bryan Seaton, James Silvani, Christian Slade, Charles Soule, Anthony Spay, Ryan Stegman, Sorah Suhng, Tom Taylor, Ty Templeton, Frank Tieri, Peter Tomasi, Tim Townsend, Jamie Tyndall, James Tynion IV, Brett Weldele, Joshua Williamson, Ashley A. Woods; Vendor partnered guests / Karan Ashley, Nakia Burrise; Cancelled Pat Broderick, Nikki DeLoach, David Harbour, Linda Larkin, Jason Momoa, Billie Piper, Patrick Warburton, Scott Weinger | 120,000 attendees |

=== 2020s ===
==== Post-COVID ====
NOTE: The Wayback Machine has been unable to properly archive the MegaCon guest lists since the 2021 event due to a page script and all guests were added here shortly before each event.

| Dates | Building | Official guests | Notes |
|---|---|---|---|
| ~~Fall 2020 (Tampa Bay)~~; Cancelled | ~~Tampa Convention Center~~ | No guests were announced before cancellation | Planned 2020 Tampa Bay event |
| ~~Oct 30–Nov 1, 2020 (Orlando)~~; Cancelled | ~~North South Concourse Hall A, South B~~ | Cancelled: Actors / Stephen Amell, Sean Astin, Leslie David Baker, Jack Bannon, Brian Baumgartner, Dave Bautista, Elizabeth Berkley, Billy Boyd, Creed Bratton, Levar Burton, Jenna Coleman, Christopher Eccleston, Giancarlo Esposito, Kate Flannery, Brendan Fraser, Mark-Paul Gosselaar, Jack Dylan Grazer, Martin Kove, John Leguizamo, Ben Lewis, Matthew Lewis, Sophia Lillis, Mario Lopez, Ralph Macchio, Ross Marquand, Jaeden Martell, Mena Massoud, Katherine McNamara, Dominic Monaghan, Oscar Nuñez, Khary Payton, Billie Piper, Christina Ricci, Chandler Riggs, Adam Savage, William Shatner, Alicia Silverstone, Antony Starr, Joonas Suotamo, George Takei, Catherine Tate, Karl Urban, Jessie T. Usher, Elijah Wood, "Weird Al" Yankovic, William Zabka; Voice actors / Troy Baker, Steve Blum, Justin Briner, Rodger Bumpass, Zach Callison, Feodor Chin, Luci Christian, Grey DeLisle, Michaela Dietz, Steve Downes, Estelle, Maile Flanagan, Grey DeLisle, Deedee Magno Hall, Charles Martinet, Adam McArthur, Paul Nakauchi, Christopher Sabat, Sean Schemmel, Kari Wahlgren, Scott Weinger, Billy West; Comic creators / Neal Adams, Arthur Adams, John Beatty, Greg Capullo, Donny Cates, Tony Fleecs, Michael Golden, Mike Grell, Phil Jimenez, Adam Kubert, Andy Kubert, Greg Land, Jim Lee, Bob McLeod, Josh Middleton, Ben Percy, George Perez, Humberto Ramos, John Romita Jr., Sam de la Rosa, Alex Saviuk, Dan Slott, Scott Snyder, Renee Witterstaetter | "mini-MegaCon" planned after cancellation of the 2 dates for the main 2020 event. April 16–19, 2020; June 4–7, 2020 |
| Aug 12–15, 2021 | West Concourse Halls A-C | Actors: Kevin Alejandro, Stephen Amell, Leslie David Baker, John Barrowman, Mark Boone Jr, Katie Cassidy, Dave Coulier, Ray Fisher, Aimee Garcia, Ryan Hurst, David Koechner, Robert Patrick, Ron Perlman, Michael Rooker, Bob Saget, Adam Savage, William Shatner, John Stamos, George Takei Other listed guests: Voice Actors / Watson Amelia, Rodger Bumpass, Luci Christian, Takanashi Kiara, Charles Martinet, Brandon McInnis, Lucie Pohl, Carolina Ravassa, Christopher Sabat, Sean Schemmel, Jeremy Shada, J. Michael Tatum; Comic Creators / Steven Ahola, Sean Anderson, Aaron Bartling, Scott Blair, Pat Broderick, David Campiti, Sergio Cariello, Elias Chatzoudis, Frank Cho, Jeremy Clark, Jaime Coker, Jinky Coronado, Joe Corroney, Clayton Crain, David Deforne, Ariel Diaz, Dan DiDio, Sasha Dorogov, Jeff Edwards, Chris Ehnot, Omar Francia, Sara Frazetta, Bryan Fyffe, Brianna Garcia, Steve Garcia, John Giang, Owl Goingback, Daniel Govar, Jenni Gregory, Bob Hall, Javier Avila Hanzozuken, Tony Harris, Ben Harvey, Francisco Herrera, Morry Hollowell, Greg Horn, Will Jack, Austin Janowsky, Larry Spike Jarrell, Frank Kadar, Ryan Kincaid, Tyler Kirkham, Ron Leary Jr., Creees Lee, Jae Lee, Steve Lydic, Knightmare Lynch, Roland Mann, Bill Marimon, Alitha Martinez, Mike Mayhew, Bill McKay, Bob McLeod, Dan Mendoza, George Michail, Karl Moline, Bill Morrison, Mostafa Moussa, James C. Mulligan, Sean Murray, Tao Nguyen, Ryan Ottley, Alfred Paige, Mog Park, Mark Pennington, Martin Pierro, Aron Pohara, Benny Powell, Jenna Powell, James Pruett, Rodney Ramos, Patrick Reilly, Alex Riegel, Andrew Robinson, Tone Rodriguez, Sam de la Rosa, Joe Rubinstein, Fabrice Sapolsky, Alex Saviuk, Bryan Seaton, Jim Shooter, Andy Smith, Larry Stroman, Sorah Suhng, Arthur Suydam, Jamie Tyndall, Robert Venditti, Karen Whitfield, Nathan Wiedemer, Keith Williams, Kevin Wood, Ashley A. Woods, Anna Zhuo; Vendor Partnered Guests / Karan Ashley, Dwayne Cameron, Michael Copon, Austin St.John; Cancelled: Actors / Sean Astin, Leslie David Baker, Dave Bautista, Billy Boyd, Christopher Eccleston, Giancarlo Esposito, Kate Flannery, Brendan Fraser, Jon Lovitz, Ross Marquand, James Marsters, Dominic Monaghan, Oscar Nunez, Danielle Panabaker, Billie Piper, Brent Spiner, Elijah Wood, D. B. Woodside; Voice actors / Justin Briner, Maile Flanagan, Paul Nakauchi, Nolan North, Billy West; Comic creators / Mirka Andolfo, Chris Campana, Greg Capullo, Donny Cates, Adelso Corona, Tony Daniel, John Delaney, Francine Delgado, Derec Donovan, Michael Dooney, Jason Fabok, Mitch Gerads, Michael Golden, John Hebert, Steve Horton, Sam Humphries, Megan Hutchison, Dave Johnson, Tom King, Tony Kordos, Leo Leibelman, Shannon Maer, Sam Maggs, Clay Mann, José Marzan Jr., David Nakayama, Graham Nolan, George Pérez, Evan Shaner, Scott Snyder, Mark Sparacio, Ryan Stegman, Mico Suayan, Frank Tieri, Tim Townsend, Joshua Williamson, Ron Wilson, Barringer Fox Wingard III, Renee Witterstaetter | 100,000 attendees Originally scheduled for March 18–21 but pushed back. Masks were required. |
| May 19–22, 2022 | North South Concourse Hall A, South B | Actors: Jeff Anderson, Sean Astin, Britt Baker, Dante Basco, Brie Bella, Nikki Bella, Alexa Bliss, Billy Boyd, Lorraine Bracco, Tanner Buchanan, LeVar Burton, Gina Carano, Carmella, Adam Cole, Ashley Eckstein, Giancarlo Esposito, Trevor Fehrman, Ric Flair, Brendan Fraser, Nathan Fillion, Martin Kove, Jerry Lawler, Matthew Lewis, Caity Lotz, Jes Macallan, Ralph Macchio, James Marsters, Jason Mewes, Dominic Monaghan, Mary Mouser, Rey Mysterio, Brian O'Halloran, Kevin Owens, Chris Sarandon, Adam Scherr, Mark Sheppard, Kevin Smith, Mike Smith, Brent Spiner, John Paul Tremblay, The Undertaker, Robb Wells, Elijah Wood, William Zabka Other listed guests: Voice Actors / Zach Aguilar, Troy Baker, Anjali Bhimani, Beau Billingslea, Steve Blum, Justin Briner, Kevin Conroy, Justin Cook, Jessica Darrow, Steve Downes, Maile Flanagan, Chloé Hollings, Matt Lanter, Jason Liebrecht, David Matranga, Paige O'Hara, Ken Page, Monica Rial, Christopher Sabat, Sean Schemmel, Dana Snyder, James Arnold Taylor, Chris Wehkamp, Billy West; Comic Creators / Steven Ahola, Mirka Andolfo, Brian Azzarello, Lloyd Bailey, Bjorn Barends, John Beatty, Raymond Bermudez, Scott Blair, Pat Broderick, Alvaro Martinez Bueno, Letizia Cadonici, Chris Campana, Eric Canete, Greg Capullo, Sergio Cariello, Donny Cates, Elias Chatzoudis, Derrick Chew, Jeremy Clark, Jamie Coker, Amanda Conner, Clayton Crain, Shawn Crystal, Dennis Culver, Krystiano DaCosta, Tony Daniel, Jeff Dekal, Francine Delgado, Werther Dell'Edera, Johnny Desjardins, Ariel Diaz, Dan Didio, Joe Doyle, Martin Dunn, Jeffrey Edwards, Tommy Lee Edwards, Chris Elnot, Elliot Fernandez, Athena Finger, Walt Flanagan, Sara Frazetta, Agnes Garbowska, John Giang, Rossi Gifford, Michael Golden, Daniel Govar, Jenni Gregory, Chris Hamer, Chad Hardin, John Hebert, Jonathan Hedrick, Francisco Herrera, Morry Hollowell, Greg Horn, Megan Hutchison-Cates, Mark Irwin, Austin Janowsky, Sam Johns, Phillip Kennedy Johnson, Javan Jordan, Ejikure Wee Kiat, Ryan Kincaid, Tom King, Michael Kingston, Greg Kirkpatrick, Tony Kordos, Adam Kubert, Emma Kubert, Andres Labrada, Dr. Travis Langley, Ken Lashley, Stanley Artgerm Lau, Jerry "The King" Lawler, Ron Leary Jr., Creees Lee, Inhyuk Lee, Erin Lefler, Leo Leibelman, Kendrick "Kunkka" Lim, Tula Lotay, Steve Lydic, Knightmare Lynch, Criss Madd, Sam Maggs, Clay Mann, Anthony Marques, Jose Marzan Jr., Marco Mastrazzo, Francesco Mattina, Sam McCandless, Bill McKay, Bob McLeod, Steve McNiven, Dan Mendoza, Jonboy Meyers, Frank Miller, Inaki Miranda, Roy Miranda, Jorge Molina, Karl Moline, Bill Morrison, Mostafa Moussa, Tony Moy, James C. Mulligan, Marat Mychaels, David Nakayama, Tao Nguyen, Graham Nolan, Ryan Ottley, Jimmy Palmiotti, Dan Panosian, Yanick Paquette, Mark Pennington, Ryan Parrott, Benjamin Percy, Stephanie Phillips, Aron Pohara, Jenna Powell, Humberto Ramos, Rodney Ramos, Sabine Rich, Tone Rodriguez, Don Rosa, Sam de la Rosa, Joe Rubenstein, Alex Saviuk, Sajad Shah, Jim Shooter, Marc Silvestri, Martin Simmonds, Sozomaika, Ryan Stegman, Mico Suayan, Sorah Suhng, Arthur Suydam, Josua "Sway" Swaby, Ivan Tao, Silenn Thomas, Frank Tieri, Tim Townsend, Marco Turini, Jamie Tyndall, James Tynion IV, Ram V, Jose Varese, Pablo "Lobos" Villalobos, Zeb Wells, Freddie Williams II, Joshua Williamson, Renee Witterstaetter, Joe Wos, Anna Zhuo, Chrissie Zullo; Vendor Partnered Guests / Karan Ashley, Nakia Burrise, Jackie Dallas, Hunter Deno, Elissa Dowling, Catherine Sutherland; Cancelled Marguerite Bennett, Rus Braun, Joshua Cassara, John Cleese, Kami Garcia, Mitch Gerads, Mike Grell, Jeff Hardy, Matt Hardy, Jae Lee, Mog Park, Katee Sackhoff, John Timms, Ashley A. Woods | >140,000 attendees |
| March 30-April 2, 2023 | Whole North South Concourse Building sans part of North Hall B | Actors: Dana Barron, Brec Bassinger, Jon Bernthal, Jacob Bertrand, Christie Brinkley, Steve Burns, Neve Campbell, Chevy Chase, Hayden Christensen, Gwendoline Christie, John Cleese, Charlie Cox, Rosario Dawson, Vincent D'Onofrio, Ashley Eckstein, Giancarlo Esposito, Mark-Paul Gosselaar, Anthony Michael Hall, Garrett Hedlund, Charlie Hunnam, Jamie Kennedy, Martin Kove, Zachary Levi, Mario Lopez, Vivien Lyra Blair, Matthew Lewis, Matthew Lillard, Ralph Macchio, Xolo Maridueña, Sonequa Martin-Green, James McAvoy, Gates McFadden, Anson Mount, Lana Parrilla, Ethan Peck, Sam Raimi, Emilio Rivera, Katee Sackhoff, Emily Swallow, Skeet Ulrich, Mercedes Varnado, Cerina Vincent, Carl Weathers, Henry Winkler, William Zabka Other listed guests: Voice Actors / Zach Aguilar, Jodi Benson, Justin Briner, Luci Christian, Colleen Clinkenbeard, Susan Eisenberg, Kellen Goff, Marty Grabstein, Jennifer Hale, David Hayter, Kenny James, Samantha Kelly, Brianna Knickerbocker, Aleks Le, Charles Martinet, Shameik Moore, George Newbern, Nolan North, Christopher Sabat, Ian Sinclair, Sonny Strait, Tara Strong, Abby Trott, Suzie Yeung; Youtubers / Austin Burke, Sean Chandler, John Flickinger, Cody Leach, Cris Parker; Comic Creators / Jay Anacleto, Mirka Andolfo, Jeff Balke, Eric Basaldua, Simone Bianchi, David Booher, Pat Broderick, Mark Brooks, Ryan Brown, Chris Campana, Sergio Cariello, Joshua Cassara, Frank Cho, Jeremy Clark, Joe Corroney, Clayton Crain, Eranga D, Tiago Da Silva, Dame Darcy, Mike Debalfo, Sam de la Rosa, Mike DeCarlo, Francine Delgado, Ariel Diaz, Simone Di Meo, Derec Donovan, Joe Doyle, Gerry Duggan, Jeffrey Edwards, Chris Ehnot, Francesca Fantini, Elliot Fernandez, Athena Finger, Asiah Fulmore, Kami Garcia, Alé Garza, Mitch Gerads, John Giang, Erik Gist, Daniel Govar, Scott Hanna, Jonathan Hedrick, Morry Hollowell, Greg Horn, Austin Janowsky, Geoff Johns, Phillip Kennedy Johnson, Javan Jordan, Ryan Kincaid, Greg Kirkpatrick, Scott Koblish, Tony Kordos, Mike Krome, Adam Kubert, Andy Kubert, Emma Kubert, Greg Land, Travis Langley, Ron Leary Jr., Creees Lee, Jae Lee, Jeph Loeb, Steve Lydic, Megan Maher, Clay Mann, Jose Marzan Jr., Marco Mastrazzo, Ed McGuinness, Bill McKay, Bob McLeod, Steve McNiven, Dawn McTeigue, Jason Meents, Jonboy Meyers, Frank Miller, Karl Moline, Bill Morrison, Mostafa Moussa, Tony Moy, James C. Mulligan, Marat Mychaels, David Nakayama, Alice Nerf, Kael Ngu, Tao Nguyen, Sam Noir, Ryan Ottley, Cassy Parsons, Mark Pennington, Andrew Pepoy, Benjamin Percy, Gabriel Picolo, Martin Pierro, Marissa Pope, Jenna Powell, Alan Quah, Joe Quesada, Rodney Ramos, Ivan Reis, Aaron Reynolds, Sabine Rich, JP Roth, Joe Rubinstein, Alex Saviuk, Stephen Segovia, Sajad Shah, Jim Shooter, Uko Smith, Ryan Stegman, Mico Suayan, Sorah Suhng, Arthur Suydam, Joshua Swaby, Frank Tieri, Peter Tomasi, Marco Turini, Jamie Tyndall, Jose Varese, Pablo Villalobos, Joshua Williamson, Kyle Willis, Kez Wilson, Ron Wilson, Renee Witterstaetter, Joe Wos, Martin Zavala, Anna Zhuo; Vendor Partnered Guests / Karan Ashley, Walter Emanuel Jones, WholeWheatPete; Cancelled Sean Gunn, Steven Ahola, Donny Cates, Marco Checchetto, Adelso Corona, Deliliah Dawson, Robbie Daymond, Chad Hardin, Mario Lopez, Max Mittelman, Christina Ricci, Tone Rodriguez, Julian Tedesco | >160,000 attendees Prepaid parking introduced |
| February 1–4, 2024 | West Concourse Halls A-D | Actors: Robbie Amell, Stephen Amell, Paul Bettany, Don Bluth, Johnny Yong Bosch, Gina Carano, Hayden Christensen, Holly Marie Combs, Kevin Connolly, Anthony Daniels, Keith David, Geena Davis, Felicia Day, Kevin Dillon, Shannen Doherty, Cary Elwes, Eman Esfandi, Giancarlo Esposito, Jamie Farr, Jerry Ferrara, Michael J. Fox, Mckenna Grace, Adrian Grenier, Sean Gunn, Butch Hartman, Tom Hiddleston, Michelle Hurd, Ke Huy Quan, Diana Lee Inosanto, Jason Isaacs, Alex Kingston, Jason Lee, Juliette Lewis, Matthew Lewis, Christopher Lloyd, Daniel Logan, Gaten Matarazzo, Rose McGowan, Ewan McGregor, Vivienne Medrano, Alyssa Milano, Cameron Monaghan, Shameik Moore, Temuera Morrison, Jaime Pressly, Jason Priestley, Randy Quaid, Jacob Romero, Eli Roth, John Rhys-Davies, Katey Sagal, Chris Sarandon, Susan Sarandon, Aidan Scott, Greg Sestero, William Shatner, Wallace Shawn, Joonas Suotamo, Ethan Suplee, Loretta Swit, Lea Thompson, Marisa Tomei, Danny Trejo, Alan Tudyk, Grace Van Dien, Jeff Ward, Ming-Na Wen, Rainn Wilson, Thomas F. Wilson, Finn Wolfhard, Robin Wright Other listed guests: Voice Actors / Zach Aguilar, Dee Bradley Baker, Justin Briner, Luci Christian, Colleen Clinkenbeard, Peter Cullen, Grey DeLisle, Ashley Eckstein, Maile Flanagan, Kathleen Herles, Kate Higgins, Richard Steven Horvitz, Nadji Jeter, Phil LaMarr, Matt Lanter, Yuri Lowenthal, Adam McArthur, Sarah Natochenny, Neil Newbon, Alex Organ, Tara Platt, Brandon Rogers, Megan Shipman, Natalie Van Sistine, Roger Craig Smith, Patricia Summersett, Fred Tatasciore, James Arnold Taylor, Frank Welker, Billy West; Youtubers / Sean Chandler, Cody Leach, Abdallah Smash, Evil Ted Smith; Comic Creators / Jason Aaron, Arthur Adams, Brad Anderson, Enid Balám, Mike Baron, Aaron Bartling, John Beatty, Rose Besch, Simone Bianchi, Sweeney Boo, Jeff Brennan, Mark Brooks, Nicole Brune, David Byrne, Sergio Cariello, Jodie Rae Charity, Elias Chatzoudis, Derrick Chew, Joyce Chin, Frank Cho, Mike Choi, Jeremy Clark, Dan Conner, Joe Corroney, Clayton Crain, Jared Cullum, EmilyAnn Cummings, Tony Daniel, Sam de la Rosa, Mike Debalfo, Görkem Demir, Johnny Desjardins, Simone Di Meo, Ariel Diaz, Dave Dorman, Joe Doyle, Joseph Dragunas, Dave Dwonch, Jeffrey Edwards, Chris Ehnot, Sketch Ellis, Jason Fabok, YiLi Fang, Pasquale Ferry, Omar Francia, Sami Francis, Santa Fung, Brianna Garcia, Kami Garcia, Mitch Gerads, Newsha Ghasemi, John Giang, Travis Gibb, Guy Gilchrist, Jay Gillespie, E.M. Gist, Jonathan Glapion, Michael Golden, Daniel Govar, Mike Grell, Tom Grummett, Marc Guggenheim, Santi Guillen, Garrett Gunn, Cully Hamner, Scott Hanna, Chad Hardin, Tony Harris, Clayton Henry, Bryan Hitch, Rick Hoberg, Greg Horn, Geof Isherwood, Will Jack, Tim Jacobus, Austin Janowsky, Geoff Johns, Phillip Kennedy Johnson, Javan Jordan, Eric July, Frank A. Kadar, Jason Keith, Collin Kelly, Dan Khanna, Ejikure Wee Kiat, Ryan Kincaid, Tom King, Tony Kordos, Craig Kyle, Andres Labrada, Travis Langley, Jackson Lanzing, Stanley Lau, Ron Leary Jr., InHyuk Lee, Jae Lee, Erin Lefler, Matthew G. Lewis, Lesley Leirix Li, Kendrick "Kunkka" Lim, Jeph Loeb, Lamont Magee, Francis Manapul, Anthony Marques, Jason Martin, Jose Marzan Jr., Francesco Mattina, Bill McKay, Bob McLeod, Steve McNiven, Jarrett Melendez, Brad Meltzer, Jason Metcalf, Jonboy Meyers, Frank Miller, Mel Milton, Mark Morales, Bill Morrison, Tony Moy, Marat Mychaels, David Nakayama, Don Nguyen, Sedat Oezgen, Ryan Ottley, Jason Palmer, Yanick Paquette, Mark Pennington, Gabriel Picolo, Stephen Platt, Aron Pohara, Marissa Pope, Alan Quah, Dan Quintana, Rodney Ramos, Ivan Reis, Aaron Reynolds, Sabine Rich, Tone Rodriguez, Joe Rubinstein, William Russell, Javier Saltares, David Sanchez, Jackie Santiago, Fabrice Sapolsky, Alex Saviuk, Stuart Sayger, Sajad Shah, Jim Shooter, Marc Silvestri, Martin Simmonds, Dietrich O. Smith, Peter Snejberg, Scott Snyder, Jen Soska, Sylvia Soska, Charles Soule, Ryan Stegman, JaVon Stokes, Mico Suayan, Sorah Suhng, Arthur Suydam, Nathan Szerdy, Ben Templesmith, Frank Tieri, Peter Tomasi, Chris Uminga, Chrissie Uminga-Zullo, Jose Varese, Pablo Villalobos, Karen Whitfield, Keith Williams, Kyle Willis, Matt Wilson, Renee Witterstaetter, Joe Wos, Matt Youngmark, Martin Zavala, Maytal Zchut, Anna Zhuo; Vendor Partnered Guests / George Buza, Steve Cardenas, Michael Copon, Jackie Dallas, Catherine Disher, Walter Emanuel Jones, Chris Potter, Shannon Scott, Allison Sealy-Smith, Austin St. John, Lenore Zann; Cancelled Jay Anacleto, Mirka Andolfo, Sofia Boutella, Pat Broderick, Tony Danza, Chuck Dixon, Elliot Fernandez, Jonathan Frakes, Gary Frank, Iñaki Godoy, Klaus Janson, Mike Mayhew, McLain McGuire, Mostafa Moussa, Joseph Quinn, Christopher Sabat, Natali Sanders, Alessandro Vitti, Dave Wittenberg, Chris Yost | >190,000 attendees |

==== Whole building ====
| Dates | Building | Official Guests | Notes |
|---|---|---|---|
| February 6–9, 2025 | Whole North South Concourse Building, Rosen Centre | Actors: Freema Agyeman, Ryan Kiera Armstrong, Hank Azaria, Morena Baccarin, Jim Beaver, Corbin Bleu, Jamie Campbell Bower, Tanner Buchanan, Ravi Cabot-Conyers, Alexander Calvert, Tom Cavanagh, Jenna Coleman, Ruth Connell, Arthur Darvill, Erica Durance, Peter Facinelli, Fabien Frankel, Seth Gabel, Mel Gibson, Mandip Gill, David Giuntoli, Danny Glover, Lucas Grabeel, Ashley Greene, Carla Gugino, Grant Gustin, Travis Landry, Anthony Michael Hall, Paul Walter Hauser, Tyler Hoechlin, Willa Holland, Nicholas Hoult, Bryce Dallas Howard, Clint Howard, Ron Howard, Manny Jacinto, Alex Kingston, Martin Kove, Kyriana Kratter, Kristin Kreuk, Jude Law, Brandon H. Lee, Matthew Lillard, Caity Lotz, Dolph Lundgren, Kellan Lutz, Ben McKenzie, Christopher Mintz-Plasse, Donny Most, Mary Mouser, Judd Nelson, Yuji Okumoto, Genevieve Padalecki, Jared Padalecki, Danielle Panabaker, Candice Patton, James Phelps, Oliver Phelps, Billie Piper, Priscilla Presley, Ella Purnell, DJ Qualls, Joseph Quinn, David Ramsey, Jackson Rathbone, Emily Bett Rickards, Molly Ringwald, Michael Rosenbaum, Brandon Routh, Matt Ryan, Katey Sagal, Adam Savage, Andy Serkis, Ally Sheedy, Mark Sheppard, John Wesley Shipp, Elisabeth Shue, Robert Timothy Smith, Matt Smith, Samantha Smith, Sting, Catherine Tate, Bitsie Tulloch, Skeet Ulrich, Carlos Valdes, Tom Welling, Anson Williams, Bonnie Wright, William Zabka Other listed guests: Voice actors / AmaLee, Troy Baker, Greg Baldwin, Dante Basco, Eric Bauza, Paul Castron Jr., Luci Christian, Dameon Clarke, Colleen Clinkenbeard, Ian James Corlett, Tim Daly, Jack De Sena, Brian Donovan, Steve Downes, Marisa Duran, Ashley Eckstein, Zach Tyler Eisen, Doug Erholtz, Maile Flanagan, Tom Gibis, Kyle Hebert, Sean Hennigan, Erika Henningsen, Neil Kaplan, Aleks Le, Katie Leigh, Ryan Colt Levy, Yuri Lowenthal, Josh Martin, David Matranga, Jillian Michaels, Kate Micucci, Dave B. Mitchell, Michaela Jill Murphy, Stephanie Nadolny, George Newbern, Phil Parsons, Tara Platt, Monica Rial, Robbie Rist, Blake Roman, Alejandro Saab, Christopher Sabat, Paul St. Peter, Joshua Seth, Stephanie Sheh, Ian Sinclair, André Sogliuzzo, Sonny Strait, Karen Strassman, Amir Talai, Chris Tergliafera, Vincent Tong, Eric Vale, Mae Whitman, Sarah Wiedenheft, Stephanie Young, Michael Yurchak; Comic creators / Arthur Adams, Jeremy Adams, Mirka Andolfo, Brian Azzarello, Enid Balam, Bjorn Barends, Brett Bean, Lee Bermejo, Rose Besch, Laura Braga, Bobby Breed, Mark Brooks, Ryan Browne, Nicole Brune, Alvaro Martinez Bueno, Chris Burnham, David A. Byrne, Chris Campana, Deniz Camp, Giuseppe Camuncoli, Greg Capullo, Donny Cates, Elias Chatzoudis, Marco Checchetto, Frank Cho, Mike Choi, Carla Cohen, Chris Condon, Danielle Conner, Alfredo Cordona, Joe Corroney, Clayton Crain, Mike Debalfo, Mike DeCarlo, Sam De La Rosa, Fabrizio De Tommaso, Werther Dell'Edera, Gabriele Dell'Otto, Johnny Desjardins, Ariel Diaz, Dave Dorman, Daniel Earls, Sketch Ellis, Kyu Yong Eom, Riccardo Federici, Sean Forney, Sami Francis, Kerry Gammill, Lee Garbett, Brianna Garcia, Kami Garcia, Mitch Gerads, John Giang, Guy Gilchrist, Jay Gillespie, Jonathan Glapion, Patrick Gleason, Godtail, Michael Golden, Daniel Govar, Marc Guggenheim, Garrett Gunn, Scott Hanna, Chad Hardin, Chris Hays, Greg Horn, Larry Houston, Derek Hunter, Tim Jacobus, Jorge Jimenez, Jock, Phillip Kennedy Johnson, Joëlle Jones, Javan Jordan, Eric July, Frank A. Kadar, Hiroshi Kanatani, Ryan Kincaid, Tony Kordos, Mike Krome, Emma Kubert, Craig Kyle, Greg Land, Ken Lashley, Creees Lee, Inhyuk Lee, Soo Lee, Erin Lefler, Leslie Leirix Li, Rachta Lin, Kevin Maguire, Alex Maleev, Mateus Manhanini, Clay Mann, Anthony Marques, Jose Marzan Jr., Todd McFarlane, Bill McKay, Federico Mele, Travis Mercer, Jason Metcalf, Lucas Meyer, Jonboy Meyers, Adam Michaels, Frank Miller, Jorge Molina, Bill Morrison, Mostafa Moussa, Tony Moy, James Mulligan, Marat Mychaels, Kael Ngu, Sedat Oezgen, Ryan Ottley, Jason Palmer, Dan Parent, Lucio Parrillo, David Pepose, Ben Percy, Khoi Pham, Stephanie Phillips, Gabriel Picolo, Stephen Platt, Marissa Pope, Alan Quah, Joe Quesada, Sukesha Ray, Aaron Reynolds, Andrew Robinson, Leonardo Romero, William Russell, Maria Laura Sanapo, Refa Sandoval, Marco Santucci, Alex Saviuk, Joseph Schmalke, Sajah Shah, Tim Sheridan, Satoshi Shiki, Martin Simmonds, Dietrich Smith, Scott Snyder, Jen Soska, Sylvia Soska, Charles Soule, Mark Sparacio, Ryan Stegman, Chris Stevens, JaVon Stokes, Mico Suayan, Sorah Suhng, Arthur Suydam, Nathan Szerdy, Ben Templesmith, John Timms, Danny Trang, Naoto Tsushima, Jamie Tyndall, James Tynion IV, Chris Uminga, Pablo Villalobos, Zeb Wells, Lucas Werneck, Freddie Williams II, Robert Wilson IV, Renee Witterstaetter, Maria Wolf, Lauren Wright, Kelly Yates, Matt Yocum, Jim Zub, Chrissie Zullo; Book Authors / Amy Buchanan, Ambar Cardova, Danielle Comeaux, Robbie Dorman, Jason Dorough, Paige Lavoie, Luna Laurier, Adrienne H Lee, Alexis Patton, Ginny Myers Sain, Ila Sikorski, Andie Smith; Youtubers / Dream, Star Wars Theory; Vendor partnered guests / Steven Ahola, Kaare Andrews, Karan Ashley, Patricia Azán, Aaron Bartling, Nakia Burrise, Steve Cardenas, Sergio Cariello, Luis Carreño, Gerry Conway, Erik Gist, Marty Grabstein, Tyler Kirkham, Leirix, A.J. LoCascio, David Nakayama, Davide Paratore, Jason Paige, Reiq, Sabine Rich, Natali Sanders, Sozomaika, Catherine Sutherland, Matt Wilson, Lenore Zann, Martin Zavala, Anna Zhuo; Cancelled Stephen Amell, Fernando Blanco, Millie Bobby Brown, Alex Brightman, Chris Burnham, John Tyler Christopher, Cal Dodd, Javier Fernandez, Mike Flanagan, Patrick Horvath, Pepe Larraz, Samm Maggs, Doug Mahnke, Cara McGee, Vivienne Medrano, Belen Ortega, Mike Royer, Kate Siegel, Alicia Silverstone, Laura Vandervoort, Jodie Whittaker, Henry Winkler | >190,000 attendees First full building event |
| March 19–22, 2026 | West Concourse halls A-E1, Rosen Plaza | Actors: Gillian Anderson, Sean Astin, Alec Baldwin, Stephen Baldwin, Jennifer Beals, Catherine Bell, Thora Birch, Orlando Bloom, Billy Boyd, John Boyega, Cara Buono, John Carpenter, Nick Castle, John Cena, Arden Cho, Mike Colter, Jake Connelly, Dean Cundey, Robert Davi, James Denton, Giancarlo Esposito, Oded Fehr, Corey Feldman, Jonathan Frakes, Brendan Fraser, Annabeth Gish, Heather Graham, Frank Grillo, John Hannah, Lena Headey, Josh Holloway, Helen Hunt, Omri Katz, Dafne Keen, Walter Koenig, Christopher Lambert, Nicholas Lea, Tommy Lee Wallace, Thomas Lennon, Matthew Lewis, Diego Luna, Bailee Madison, Jason Marsden, James Marsters, Gates McFadden, Dominic Monaghan, Jamison Newlander, Dean Norris, Colin O'Donoghue, Joe Pantoliano, Robert Patrick, Ron Perlman, Mitch Pileggi, Martha Plimpton, John Rhys Davies, Wyatt Russell, Angela Sant'Albano, William Shatner, Vinessa Shaw, P. J. Soles, Brent Spiner, Mr. T, Karl Urban, Patricia Velasquez, Jodie Whittaker, Sam Witwer, Elijah Wood, Cedric Yarbrough, Ji-young Yoo Other listed guests: Voice actors / Zach Aguilar, Krystina Alabado, Rei Ami, Nick Apostolides, Aliona Baranova, Daniel Baugh, Michael Bell, Dawn M. Bennett, Romulo Bernal Katsuki, Abigail Blythe, Christian Borle, Johnny Yong Bosch, Justin Briner, R. Bruce Elliott, Roger Clark, Colleen Clinkenbeard, Catero Colbert, Lilli Cooper, Peter Cullen, Jim Cummings, Hayden Daviau, Brian Drummond, Barbara Dunkelman, Kara Eberle, Ashley Eckstein, Kara Edwards, Hisao Egawa, Jennifer English, Juan Felipe Cortes, Nika Futterman, Jennifer Hale, Erika Harlacher, Kyle Hebert, Jacob Hopkins, Ian James Corlett, Lindsay Jones, Michael Jones, Alessandro Juliani, Matt Lanter, Aleks Le, Landon McDonald, Blythe Melin, Katsuji Mori, Joel Perez, Cat Protano, Mallorie Rodak, Alejandro Saab, Christopher Sabat, Brad Swaile, Catherine Taber, Nazeeh Tarsha, James Arnold Taylor, Veronica Taylor, Jaclyn Thomas, Eric Vale, Frank Welker, Bob West, Arryn Zech; Comic creators / Jason Aaron, Serg Acuna, Jeremy Adams, Don Aguillo, Mirka Andolfo, Kaare Andrews, Julio Anta, Heather Antos, Brian Azzarello, Enid Balam, Bjorn Barends, Brett Bean, Todd Beats, Lee Bermejo, Federico Bertoni, Rose Besch, Simon Bisley, Carola Borelli, Tim Bradstreet, Bobby Breed, Brett Breeding, Ed Brisson, Mark Brooks, David Byrne, Alessandro Cappuccio, Greg Capullo, Domenico Carbone, Alfredo Cardona, Lipwei Chang, Elias Chatzoudis, Frank Cho, Iban Coello, Chris Condon, Amanda Conner, Clayton Crain, Eranga D, Elisabetta D'Amico, Sam De La Rosa, Mike Debalfo, Johnny Desjardins, Dave Dorman, Sketch Ellis, Fang Fang, Javi Fernandez, Meghan Fitzmartin, Sebastian Fiumara, Melissa Flores, Sean Forney, Bruno Frenda, Kerry Gammill, Kami Garcia, Raymond Gay, John Giang, Travis Gibb, Valerio Giangiordano, Guy Gilchrist, Erik Gist, Godtail, Bradley Golden, Michael Golden, Isaac Goodhart, Sean Gordon Murphy, Daniel Govar, Garrett Gunn, Morgan Hampton, Scott Hanna, Chad Hardin, Kyle Higgins, Michael Hinson, Matt Horak, Greg Horn, Jody Houser, Larry Houston, Jason Howard, Tini Howard, Corin Howell, Derek Hunter, Tim Jacobus, Jock, Camron Johnson, Frank Kadar, Hiroshi Kanatani, Joe Kelly, Dan Khanna, Ryan Kincaid, Tyler Kirkham, Tony Kordos, Mike Krome, Craig Kyle, Zoe Lacchei, Greg Land, Jackson Lanzing, Creees Lee, Inhyuk Lee, Jeehyung Lee, Jim Lee, Joey Lee Cabral, Lesley Leirix Li, Claudia Leonardi, Rachta Lin, Kath Lobo, Alexander Lozano, Clay Mann, Anthony Marques, Caterina Mazzei, Cara McGee, Bill McKay, Dawn McTeigue, Federico Mele, Travis Mercer, David Messina, Frank Miller, Dan Mora, Bill Morrison, Mostafa Moussa, Tony Moy, Marat Mychaels, Kael Ngu, Belen Ortega, Ryan Ottley, Jason Palmer, Jimmy Palmiotti, Dan Panosian, David Pepose, Sara Pichelli, Stephen Platt, Marissa Pope, Kenny Porter, Joe Quesada, Dan Quintana, Simone Ragazzoni, Sukesha Ray, Vincenzo Riccardi, Marcus H. Roberts, Fernando Ruiz, Mark Russell, William Russell, Ethan Sacks, Jacoby Salcedo, Fabrice Sapolsky, Andrea Scalmazzi, Zulema Scotto Lavina, Daniel Scott Jr., Satoshi Shiki, David Silverman, Martin Simmonds, Dietrich Smith, Scott Snyder, Charles Soule, Mark Sparacio, Mark Spears, Ryan Stegman, Mico Suayan, Sorah Suhng, Arthur Suydam, Joshua Sway Swaby, Nathan Szerdy, Julian Tedesco, Ben Templesmith, Frank Tieri, Francesco Tomaselli, Peter Tomasi, John Tyler Christopher, Jamie Tyndall, Chris Uminga, Franck Uzan, Pablo Villalobos, Federico Vicentini, Suspiria Vilchez, Alessandro Vitti, Greg Weisman, David Wenzel, Charles Wilson III, Renee Witterstaetter, Maria Wolf, Anna Zhuo, Jim Zub, Chrissie Zullo-Uminga; Book Authors / Claudia Gray, Timothy Zahn; Visual Effects Artists / Dan Falconer, Flo Foxworthy, Tania Rodger, Richard Taylor; Vendor Partnered Guests / Karan Ashley, Lloyd Bailey, Steve Cardenas, Sergio Cariello, Terrence C. Carson, Carla Cohen, Vaughn Coleman, Michael Copon, Alyson Court, Tiago Da Silva, Eddie Deezen, Ariel Diaz, Chuck Dixon, Cal Dodd, Joe Doyle, Kyuyong Eom, Esau Escorza, Isaac Escorza, Jason Faunt, Blake Foster, SRBGENk, Nick Gillard, Kevin Grevioux, Will Jack, Nikkol Jelenic, Will Jordan, Eric July, Zachary Levi, Marco Mastrazzo, Jeff Monk, Mariana Moreno, David Nakayama, Lucio Parillo, Evan Parke, Courtney Rose, Sunao Saito, Natali Sanders, Masaki Sato, Wil Shrike, Katya Sinyukhina, Sozomaika, Aaron Sparrow, Patrick Thomas Parnell, Tony Trophy, Johnathan Uribe, Dolan Waddick, Dave Wilkins, Matt Wilson, Martin Zavala; Cancelled Deniz Camp, Phillip Glasser, Shannon Chan-Kent, Tony Daniel, Patrick Gleason, Henry Ian Cusick, Maria Laura Sanapo, Dennis Menheere, Jorge Molina, John Noble, Paolo Pantalena, Peggy, Alan Quah, Ivan Reis, Stephen Root, Marco Santucci, David Wenham | >200,000 attendees, First fan convention in North America to surpass 1,000,000 sq ft (93,000 m^{2}) exhibition space |
| May 20–23, 2027 | West Concourse | Actors: Jake Busey, Nicolas Cage, Michael Ironside, Dina Meyer, Denise Richards, Casper Van Dien Other listed guests: Voice actors; Comic creators; Vendor Partnered Guests; Cancelled | |

== Show layout and events ==
=== Exhibit hall ===
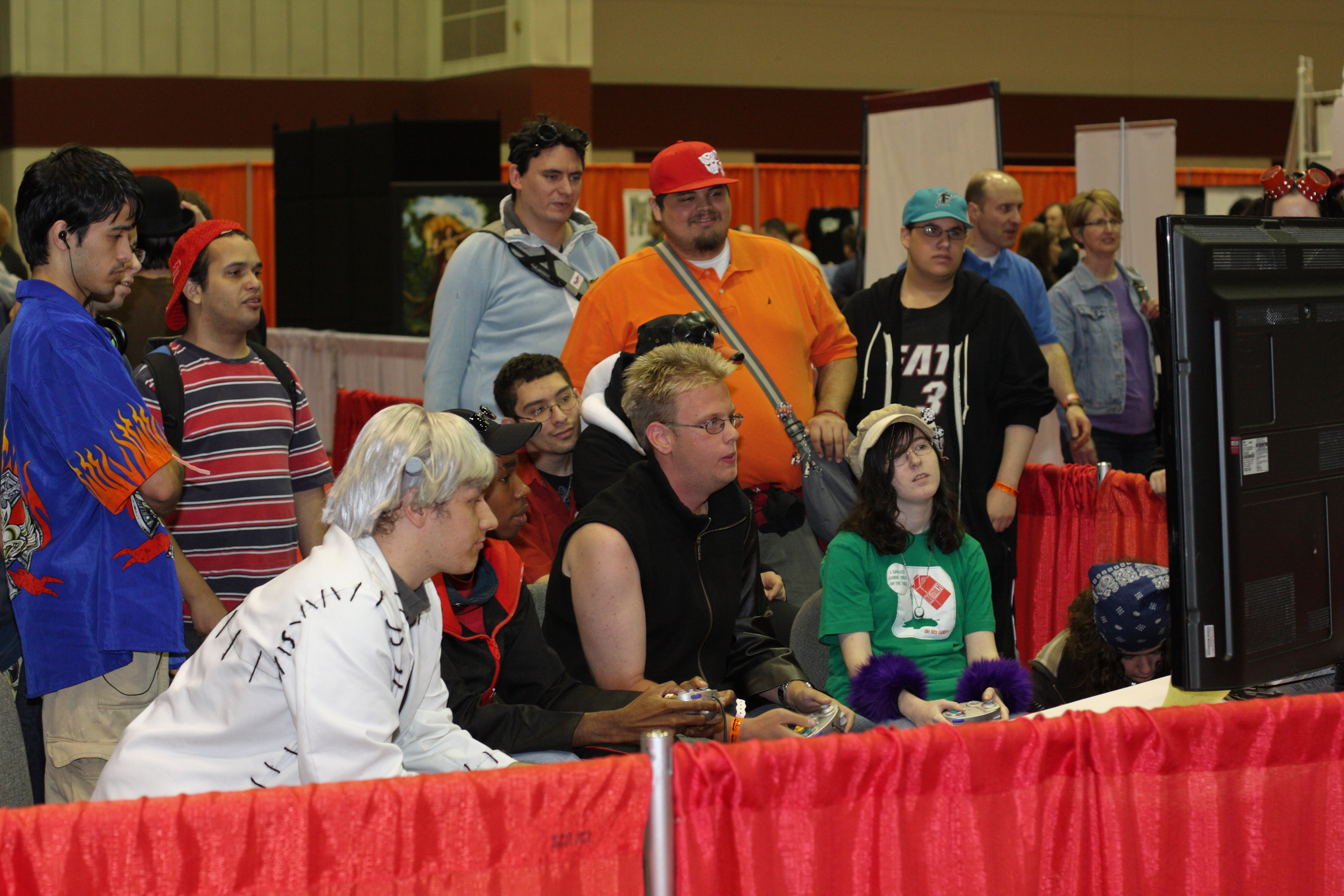
Video gaming at MegaCon 2010

MegaCon since 2012 has had an exhibit hall sectioned into many different sections listed below:
Ticket Hall: The ticketing hall is where attendees pickup their badges required for attendance or buy new tickets. The lines are separated by ticket type. Past the ticketing booths is the show waiting area where attendees await the show's opening hours. The MegaCon store is in this area and sells convention themed merchandise as well as convention exclusives.
Retail: The retail section is home to shops numbering in the hundreds. This section is often subdivided into comics and anime sections. While a majority of the businesses are small, some larger vendors also appear with more frequent ones including NASA and Dragon's Milk.
Artist Alley: A section where several hundred artists are given a booth to sell their wares. This section is surrounded by a ring of comic book guests ranging from independent publishers to writers for DC and Marvel.
Community: The community section is home to life-size replica exhibits from many fan organizations including the 501st Legion, Rebel Legion, Daleks of Florida, the 405th, and the Delta Fleet. These groups often raise funds for local charities via voluntary donations or paid photo ops.
Celebrity: Actor guests of MegaCon have booths in this area. The booths form a ring that is empty in the center to allow for longer lines for the more popular stars attending the convention. A separate area adjacent is used for photo ops of more popular celebrities.
Food Courts: Multiple areas of the show floor and lobbies contain food courts with food options provided by the convention center. Cuisine options often include: Chinese, Papa John's, barbecue, Starbucks, Häagen-Dazs, and Tex-Mex.

=== Events and panels ===
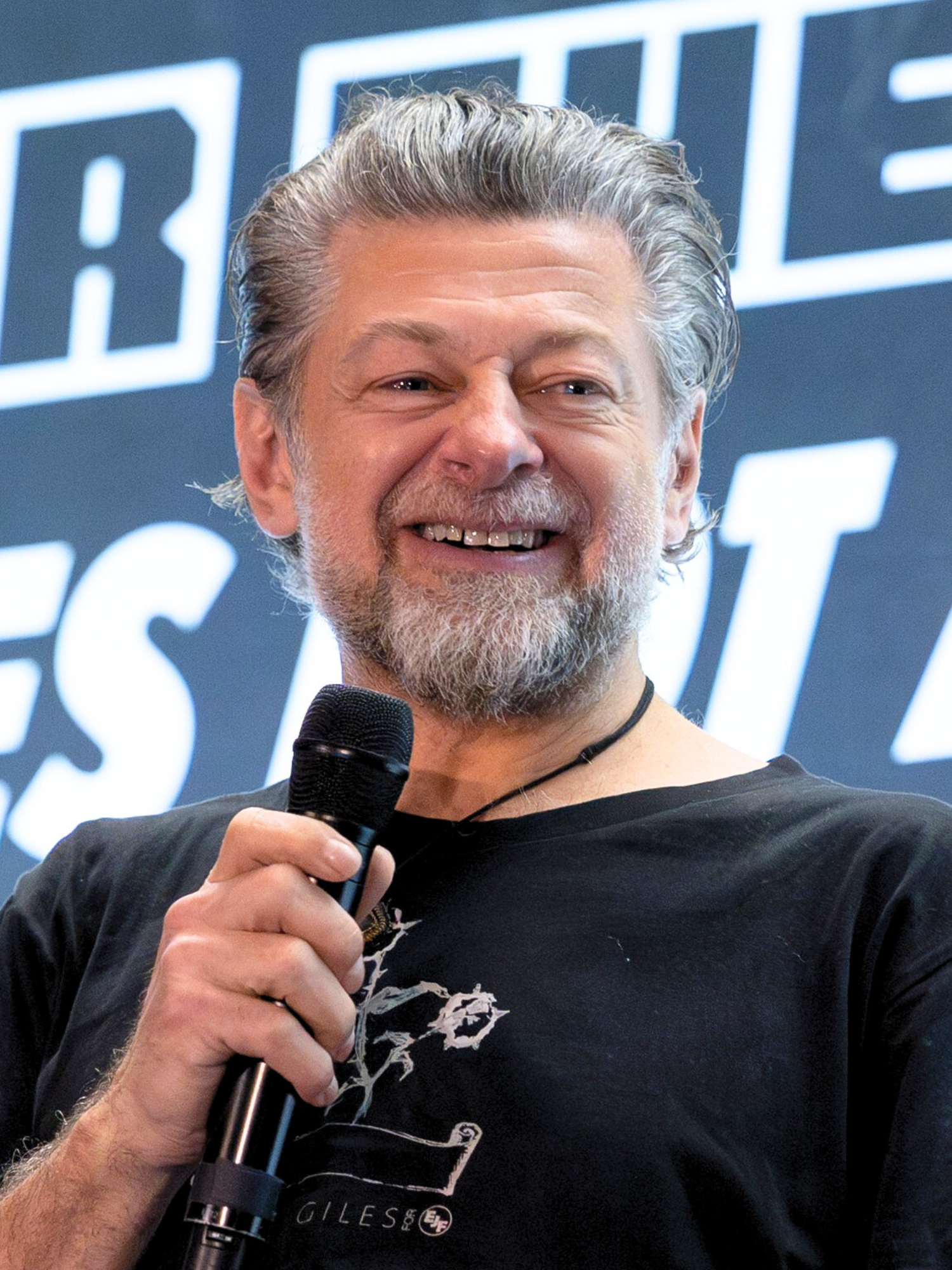
Andy Serkis at MegaCon 2025

Outside the exhibit hall, the show has many events in the convention center lobbies and panel rooms.
Panels: MegaCon is host to panels of many genres relating to cosplay, anime, gaming, and world building among many other subjects. Celebrities attending MegaCon may also star in their own panels.
Gaming: Several RPG games are hosted at MegaCon including Dungeons & Dragons living campaigns, Living Forgotten Realms, Pathfinder Society and Legends of the Shining Jewel. Non RPG gaming is also hosted at MegaCon ranging from the card-based Magic: The Gathering to strategy games. E-gaming arcades are available and tournaments are held at the event for games like Super Smash Bros.
Cosplay Contest: Since 2018, MegaCon has been home to the FanExpo Masters of Cosplay Grand Prix Sunshine Qualifier where dozens of cosplayers display their talent in costume construction.
Family Zone: The MegaCon family zone is hosted in a large panel room with activities directed towards preteens and younger. Activities include a kids cosplay contest, a sorting hat ceremony, and padawan training.
Afterparties: MegaCon has been host to afterhours entertainment since 2003. These events grew to include offsite locations in 2006. Since 2010, Moshi Moshi Productions has handled offsite after hours events with a kickoff party in the Icebar Orlando on Thursday, and themed parties on Friday and Saturday at the Rosen Plaza and Rosen Centre respectively. In 2023, a Wednesday afterparty was hosted at ICON Park. In 2024, the convention booked an exclusive afterhours event at the nearby Universal Islands of Adventure theme park.

=== Celebrity guests ===
MegaCon brings in large numbers of celebrities of various professions for fans to meet and receive autographs and photos with.
Actors: Since its migration to the Orange County Convention Center, MegaCon has drawn in celebrities who have starred in various films and television shows. Some years may see a collection of actors from a particular franchise like the four Hobbits from Lord of the Rings in 2022.
Voice Actors: MegaCon is frequented by voice actors from various western animated and anime shows as well as video game characters.
Comic Artists: From its beginning, MegaCon has had a large number of comic guests both veterans of the industry from Marvel and DC as well as indie publishers wishing to use the convention to kickstart their jump into the comic scene.
Other guests: In some years, MegaCon has been host to popular guests of other professions including authors and internet celebrities. Some vendors at MegaCon like RangerStop may also share their table space with a few non-actor celebrities.
