= John R. Hébert =

American librarian and author

- Born: c. 1950 (age c. 74)
- Education: University of Louisiana at Lafayette (BA); Georgetown University (MA)
- Occupations: librarian, author

John R. Hébert (born c. 1950) is an American librarian and author. He was employed at the Library of Congress for over 43 years when he retired in 2012.

== Biography ==
Hébert has a Bachelor of Arts in history from the University of Southwestern Louisiana and earned master's and doctorate degrees in Latin American history from Georgetown University. He began his career at the Library of Congress in 1969 as a senior reference specialist in the Geography and Map Division. In 1974, he moved to the Hispanic Division.

Hébert was the Senior Specialist in Hispanic bibliography in the Hispanic Division until he was appointed Chief of the Geography and Map Division in November 1999. He succeeded Ralph E. Ehrenberg, who retired in July 1998. Mr. Ehrenberg returned to the post after Mr. Hébert retired in 2012. In his official capacity, Hébert served on the steering committee of the Federal Geographic Data Committee and was a member and Chairman of the U.S. Board on Geographic Names.

Hébert was president and vice president of the Seminar for the Acquisition of Latin American Library Materials from 1982 to 1984. He was also a member of the advisory council for the People of America Foundation and a past-member of the Council for the International Exchange of Scholars, the National Hispanic Quincentennial Commission, the National Endowment for the Humanities and the U.S. Christopher Columbus Quincentenary Jubilee Commission.

== Publications ==
- “Virginia in Maps: Four Centuries of Settlement, Growth, and Development” (Richmond: The Library of Virginia, 2000) (contributor)
- “Charting Louisiana; Five Hundred Years of Maps (Historic New Orleans Collection, 2003) (editor)
- “The Hispanic World 1492-1898”
- “1492: An Ongoing Voyage,” (editor)
- ”The Luso-Hispanic World in Maps: A Selective Guide to Manuscript Maps to 1900 in the Collections of the Library of Congress”
- “Panoramic Maps of Anglo-American Cities”
- “Population Maps of the Western Hemisphere”
- “The Library of Congress Hispanic and Portuguese Collections: An Illustrated Guide” (1996)
- Mapping Latin America: A Cartographic Reader by Jordana Dym and Karl Offen. Page 320 (University Of Chicago Press, 2011) ISBN 0226618226

From 1973 to 1987, he served as editor of the cartographic and the bibliography and general works sections of the annual Handbook of Latin American Studies (University of Texas Press)

== Other resources ==
- C-SPAN Video Archive - Dr. John Hébert
- National Public Radio – 2001 Story on “America’s Map”
