= Mark Pennington =

British political scientist and economist

- Education: London School of Economics
- Occupations: Economist, scientist
- Known for: Professor of Political Economy and Public Policy at King's College London

Mark Pennington is a British political scientist and economist. He serves as a Professor of Political Economy and Public Policy at King's College London.

== Early life ==
Pennington received a PhD from the London School of Economics. His thesis, dated 1998, was titled Property rights, public choice and urban containment: A study of the British planning system.

== Career ==
He is a Professor of Political Economy at King's College London. He is a co-editor of The Review of Austrian Economics. His work engages critics of the classical liberal and libertarian traditions and includes contributions on public choice theory, Friedrich Hayek, urban planning, environmental governance and the theory of democratic deliberation.

He served on the board of trustees of the Institute of Economic Affairs between 2008 and November 2018. He is currently Director of the Centre for the Study of Governance and Society at King's College London

== Works ==
- Public Choice and the Politics of Government Failure (Athlone/ Continuum: 2000).
- Liberating the Land (IEA: 2002).
- Robust Political Economy (Edward Elgar: 2010).
