= 2005 in comics =

Notable events of 2005 in comics.

== Events ==
=== January ===
- January 11: debut of the Italian web-comic Mostrip, by Alberto Turturici; in May, the strip is published on paper.
- January 14: French cartoonist Piem is named Commandeur des Arts et des Lettres.
- January 20: Dutch cartoonist Tom Janssen wins his first Inktspotprijs (edition 2004) for Best Political Cartoon. During the same ceremony Joep Bertrams receives his first Inktspotprijs too
- January 31: John R. Norton begins the George comic strip.
- Decimation: House of M, The Day After by Chris Claremont, Randal Green and Aaron Lopresti (Marvel).
- In Iron Man, the story arc Extremis, by Warren Ellis and Adi Ganov, begins (Marvel).
- The New Avengers 1 by Brian Michael Bendis and David Finch (Marvel).
- Top 10: The forty-niners by Alan Moore and Gene Ha (America's Best Comics)
- Hero Squared X-tra Sized Special by Keith Giffen, J. M. DeMatteis and Joe Abraham (Atomeka press) ; debut of the Hero Squared series.
- The gambler smurfs by Luc Parthoens, Thierry Culliford and Ludo Borecki (Le Lombard).
- The cycle of water by Hub (Humbert Chabuel), first album of the Okko series (Delcourt).
- Progetto Dakota by Claudio Nizzi and Luigi Siniscalchi; in the last album of the Nick Raider series, the hero marries his eternal fiancé Violet McGraw.

=== February ===
- Batman: The man who laughs by Ed Brubaker and Doug Mahnke (DC Comics).
- First issue of Legion of Super-Heroes 5th series, the first with the 2004 team (DC comics).

=== March ===
- 2 March: first chapter of Ultimate Iron Man by Orson Scott Card and Andy Kibert (Marvel comics).
- 16 March: first chapterof Revenge of the Sith's comic version, by Miles Lane and Doug Weathley (Dark Horse).
- Dust by Jean Giraud, last album of the Blueberry series (Dargaud).
- Cinque cuori di pietra (Five stone heaths) by Lorenzo Bartoli and Walter Venturi; team-up between John Doe and Dago (Eura Editoriale).

=== April ===
- April 13:
  - DC Comics announces the discontinuation of its Humanoids and 2000 AD titles.
  - Powerade and DC Comics show the first of four new online comics starring LeBron James as superhero "King James". Written by Ron Perazza with art by Rick Leonardi (Batgirl).
- April 20: DC Comics launches the new DC Direct website.
- April 26: Artist Ed Benes (Superman) extends his exclusive agreement with DC Comics for an additional three years.
- April 28:
  - Marvel Enterprises and Paramount Pictures announce an agreement under which Paramount will distribute up to ten films over an eight-year period to be produced by Marvel.
  - Marvel Enterprises announces settlement of all pending litigation with Stan Lee over claims for participation in profits from various sources.
  - Marvel Comics announces the creation of a custom comic book written by Brian Michael Bendis (Ultimate Spider-Man, New Avengers) and featuring superheroes such as Spider-Man, Captain America and the Fantastic Four in a military-themed storyline. More than one million copies of the "Salute Our Troops" comic book were to be distributed to the troops and their families in May.
- Booze, Broads, & Bullets by Frank Miller (Dark Horse).
- Seven soldiers by Grant Morrison (DC comics).

=== May ===
- May 1: At Clickburg, The Netherlands, the first Clickies are awarded, awards for webcomics. The awards will continue up until 2010.
- May 5: Artist George Pérez (The New Teen Titans, Wonder Woman, Justice League of America) signs a 5-year exclusive agreement with DC Comics.
- May 6: debut of Brad Barron, the first Bonelli miniseries, in 18 episodes, with the album Non umani by Tito Faraci and Bruno Brindisi. Its hero, with the George Clooney's face, fights against the alien invaders in the USA of the Fifties.
- May 12: on Comicgenesis, the webcomic Sorcery 101, by Kel McDonald, appears.
- May 18: in Spirou, first chaper of Le septieme code by Roger Leloup.
- May 19: Artist J. G. Jones (Villains United, Wonder Woman) signs a 2-year exclusive contract with DC Comics.
- May 31:
  - Artist Bart Sears (Captain America and the Falcon) signs a 2-year exclusive agreement with DC Comics.
  - In Topolino, first chapter of Paperina di Rivondosa, by Silvia Ziche, pardoy of Elisa di Rivombrosa.
- At the Cannes Festival, two films taken from comics (A history of violence and Sin city) are in competition.

=== June ===
- June 6: Artists Adam Kubert (Ultimate Fantastic Four, Ultimate X-Men) and Andy Kubert (Marvel 1602, Origin, Ultimate Iron Man, Ultimate X-Men) sign 3-year exclusive agreements with DC Comics.
- June 11: Harvey Awards winners announced.
- June 21: Belgian comic artist Marc Sleen is declared an honorary citizen of Brussels.
- June 22: The first comic to carry the Boom! Studios logo, Zombie Tales #1, is published
- June 28:
  - Artist Justiniano (Day of Vengeance, The Human Race) signs a 2-year exclusive contract with DC Comics.
  - In Spirou, L'homme qui ne voulait pas mourir by Jean-David Morvan and José Luis Munuera (Spirou et Fantasio series).
- Day of vengeance by Bill Willingham (DC comics).
- The Marvel comics storyline House of M, by Brian Michael Bendis and Olivier Coipel begins.
- In Nickelodeon magazine, debut of Avatar, the last airbender – The lost adventures, by Michael Dante DiMartino and Bryan Konietzko (Dark Horse).
- With La guerra di Toro Seduto (Sitting Bull's war) by Gianfranco Manfredi and Darko Petrovic, the Magico Vento's saga about the great Siox war begins (Bonelli).
- First issue of the Italian hard-boiled miniseries Detective Dante by Lorenzo Bartoli and Roberto Recchioni (Eura editoriale).

=== July ===
- July 12: Writer Bill Willingham (Fables) renews his exclusive contract with DC Comics for an additional two years.
- July 13:
  - DC Online launches a new website for kids featuring Johnny DC.
  - DC Comics' DC Direct announces the new Looney Tunes Golden Collection action figure series. The sculptures would be officially unveiled later in the week at San Diego Comic-Con.
- July 15: Eisner Awards ceremony is held at San Diego Comic-Con.
- July 19:
  - Joe Quesada extends his contract agreement with Marvel Comics, and in addition to his current role as Editor-in-Chief, he will take on the added role as the Chief Creative Officer, Publishing.
- July 26:
  - Writer Mark Waid (Legion of Super-Heroes, Empire) signs a 2-year exclusive agreement with DC Comics.
  - Turkish cartoonist Oğuz Aral receives a statue in Istanbul.
- Rann-Thanagar war by Dave Gibbons and Ivan Reis and Villains united by Gail Simone and Dale Eaglesham (DC comics).

=== August ===
- August 2: Artist Tony Daniel (Teen Titans, Spawn, X-Force) signs a 2-year exclusive agreement with DC Comics.
- August 8: In the Danish magazine Jumbobo, The legacy, by Andreas Phil and Mårdøn Smet; debut of the gentleman thief Fantomius.The character, already often mentioned in the Paperinik stories but never appeared until then, has later had a more fortunate version by the Italian Author Marco Gervasio.
- August 30:
  - A square in San Telmo, Buenos Aires, is named after Mafalda.
  - August 30: The webcomic Crying Macho Man by Jose Cabrera goes live.
- Justice by Alex Ross and Jim Krueger (DC comics).
- Old times by Peter David and Fernando Goni (Dark Horse).

=== September ===
- September 6:
  - The New York Times is to carry a comic strip by Chris Ware within its pages.
  - Marvel has changed its corporate name to Marvel Entertainment, Inc and is to produce its own movies based upon comics characters such as Captain America, Nick Fury and the Avengers
- September 8: Contributors have been announced for the Comic Book Legal Defense Fund's annual SPX anthology. Scott Morse and Jordan Crane are amongst the forty creators
- September 12: Doonesbury is dropped and then promptly reinstated by The Guardian
- September 13:
  - The Ignatz Awards nominees are announced, with Gilbert Hernandez receiving three nominations
  - Dynamic Forces acquire license to print comics based on the Highlander films and television series
- September 18: first issue of Sonic X (Archie Comics)
- September 19: Joe Ferrara is elected to the Board of Directors of the Comic Book Legal Defense Fund
- September 20: Marvel Comics announce Neil Gaiman's next project as being related to The Eternals
- September 21:
  - Art Spiegelman's next project, Portrait of the Artist as a Young %@?*!, is to be serialised in the Virginia Quarterly Review, commencing in the Fall 2005 issue
- September 22: Bill Watterson answers fifteen selected questions from fans around the world to publicise the upcoming release of The Complete Calvin and Hobbes
- September 23:
  - The two-day Small Press Expo opens with Harvey Pekar as special guest.
- September 25: The 2005 Ignatz Awards are announced at the Small Press Expo. Amongst the winners were David B, voted the Outstanding Artist and Persepolis 2: The Story of a Return, voted Outstanding Graphic Novel
- First issue of All-Star Batman & Robin the Boy Wonder by Frank Miller and Jim Lee; it inaugurates the imprint All Star DC Comics.
- Randall Munroe begins publishing the webcomic xkcd on his personal website.
- Le boucher de Cincinnati by François Corteggiani and Michel Blanc-Dumont (La jeunesse de Blueberry series ; Dargaud).
- L’or de Maximilien by William Vance and Jean Van Hamme (XIII series ; Dargaud).
- Qualcosa è cambiato by Guido Nolitta and eight various pencillers (Bonelli); with this very long saga (18 albums and 1508 plates) the Mister No series virtually ends.

=== October ===
- October 1: Lea Hernandez steps down as editor of Girlamatic.com, to be replaced by Lisa Jonté
- October 3: Jay Stephens launches his own blog Cute Creeps From Pop Culture
- October 4: The Complete Calvin and Hobbes is released
- October 5: Matt Madden is interviewed by Bookslut
- October 8: Art Spiegelman is one of 196 inducted into the American Academy of Arts and Sciences
- October 10:
  - Dark Horse licenses the rights to reprint a number of manga titles, including Juon
  - Peter Schjeldahl of The New Yorker analyses graphic novels
- October 11:
  - Marvel 1602 wins the inaugural graphic novel Quill Award
  - First volume of Dramacom by Svetlana Chamkova (Tokyopop).
- October 13:
  - The tenth annual International Comic Arts Festival begins in Washington, D.C.
  - Ddebut of the Italian fantasy webcomic Nalshael by Studio Dardanidi.
- October 14:
  - Lynd Ward is profiled by In These Times
  - The Oberlin Review profiles Marjane Satrapi
  - Maus and Beyond, an exhibition looking at comic book and graphic novel portrayals of the Shoah, opens at the Centennial College, Toronto. It runs until November 30
  - Asterix and the falling sky by Albert Uderzo (Les éditions Albert-Renè).
- October 16: Bob Andelman, biographer of Will Eisner, picks 10 graphic novels for a beginner to start with
- October 17:
  - Charles Burns is interviewed by The Book Standard
  - The Melvin Gelman Library of George Washington University is to add 300 graphic novels to its collection
  - The New York Times profile Little Nemo in Slumberland: So Many Splendid Sundays!, a collection of Little Nemo strips publishing them as originally printed
  - Hunt Emerson has adapted John Ruskin's Unto This Last into comics format, retitling the work How To Be Rich. Two-thirds of the 15,000 print run will be distributed to secondary schools in the United Kingdom
- October 18:
  - Dale Eaglesham signs a two-year exclusive contract with DC Comics
  - Watchmen is named as one of Time magazine's top 100 English language novels published since 1923
  - Carla Speed McNeil launches the online serialisation Carla Speed McNeil of Finder. McNeil has suspended the publication of the work in comic book format, although serials will still be collected and published as graphic novels
- October 20: Dave Sim and Al Nickerson place a DC Comics contract, as annotated by Sim, on the web. See also: Creator's Bill of Rights
- October 22–23: During the Stripdagen in Houten, The Netherlands, Jan Steeman wins the Stripschapprijs. The website Stripster receives the P. Hans Frankfurtherprijs and Dik Bruynesteyn, Dick Vlottes and Jan van der Voo receive the Bulletje en Boonestaakschaal.
- October 23: Joe Sacco is profiled by The Oregonian
- October 24:
  - Roger Stern is interviewed by Newsarama
- October 26: Stephen King is to launch a comic book series with Marvel Comics based upon his Dark Tower series
- October 27:
  - The latest Xeric grants are announced
  - Image Comics launches a new website
  - Thomas N. Thornton, CEO of Andrews McMeel Publishing, responds to perceived criticisms of the company's new Calvin and Hobbes collection
  - Todd McFarlane is to be guest of honor at February 2006's inaugural New York Comic-Con
- October 31:
  - Carly Berwick laments the lack of great female comic book artists
  - The Guardian profiles Chris Ware
- First issue of Friendly Neighborhood Spider-Man (Marvel). It includes the first chapter of the Spider-Man crossover The Other.

=== November ===
- November 2:
  - Scott Morse announces he is to launch his own imprint, Red Window. He has established a distribution deal for his imprint with AdHouse Books
- November 3: Mark Millar announces he is to take a six-month sabbatical from comics for health reasons
- November 4:
  - The Harvey Awards have ended their ties with New York's Museum of Comic and Cartoon Art and are now to be presented at the Baltimore Comic-Con, with the 19th awards to be presented on Saturday, September 9, 2006
  - Don Bluth donates over a million pieces of artwork to the Savannah College of Art and Design. The donation consists of animation cels, preliminary sketches and associated drawings
  - Alan Moore is interviewed in The Independent
- November 6: It is reported that Thomas Haden Church is to play Sandman in the Spider-Man 3 movie
- November 7:
  - Slate present a slide show essay on Calvin and Hobbes
  - Newspapers in the United States are reported to be considering carrying manga strips from January 2006. The two strips reportedly up for inclusion are Van Von Hunter and Peach Fuzz
- November 8: Alan Moore is profiled by Publishers Weekly
- November 9:
  - Marvel releases its third quarter financial statement
  - IDT Entertainment announce an animated Hellboy project
- November 10: Paramount has optioned the movie rights to Charles Burns' recently completed graphic novel, Black Hole
- November 11:
  - Arnold Drake is interviewed by newsarama
  - Pulitzer Prize winner Michael Ramirez discusses the Los Angeles Times decision to let him go
  - David Simpson is fired by Tulsa World amid allegations of plagiarism
- November 12: The Los Angeles Times profiles selected artists featured in the "Masters of American Comics" exhibition, which opens at Los Angeles' Hammer Museum and the Museum of Contemporary Art on November 20
- November 14: Chris Morgan, (The Fast and the Furious: Tokyo Drift) is hired to draft a script for Universal's adaptation of DC Comics The Psycho, by James Hudnall and Dan Brereton
- November 15: Daniel Acuña signs an exclusive contract with DC Comics
- November 16:
  - Kevin "KAL" Kallaugher, editorial cartoonist of The Baltimore Sun, has been offered a buyout along with other members of the paper's staff
  - Harvey Pekar takes his American Splendor series to Vertigo, with a mini-series slated for 2006 with Dean Haspiel handling some of the art chores
- November 17:
  - Steve Lafler moves to self publishing his next works
  - Doug Harvey writes of 10 Comics That Shook The World in LA Weekly
- November 18: The trailer for Superman Returns is released
- November 19: Nominees for the second Grand Prix RTL de la BD are announced
- November 20:
  - The New York Times reviews Absolute Watchmen, an expanded collection of Alan Moore and Dave Gibbons' comic book series of the 1980s
  - It is reported that Posy Simmonds and Raymond Briggs are to be featured on the cover of the 2006 edition of the Royal Society of Literature's annual magazine, having been made fellows of the society earlier this year
- November 21:
  - Time magazine has archived its articles related to comics
- November 22: The United Kingdom's Press Gazette names its 40 most influential journalists, and includes three cartoonists, Gerald Scarfe, Carl Giles, and Matt Pritchett
- November 23:
  - Duncan Fegredo is to provide art for the 2006 Hellboy miniseries, Darkness Calls
  - Marvel Comics allows fans to vote on writer Chris Claremont's next project via its website
  - Marvel also launch the podcasting of company press conferences via its website
- November 27: Claypool Comics asks for consumer help to ensure Diamond Comics Distributors continue to carry their products
- November 28:
  - The Association des Critiques de Bande Dessinee announces the fifteen works it is considering for its Prix de la Critique. Joe Kubert's Yossel: 19 Avril 1943 is amongst those in the running for the award, won in 2004 by the French edition of Blankets by Craig Thompson
  - Malaysian cartoonist Lat is awarded a Special Jury Award at the 2004 Malaysian Press Institute (MPI)-Petronas Journalism Awards
  - Archie Comics and The Veronicas settle their dispute over the rights to the name The Veronicas
  - The New York Times explores the use the two biggest American comic book publishers have made of the epic storyline in their releases this year
  - RK Laxman's Brushing Up the Years: A Cartoonist's History of India 1947-2004 is published
- November 29:
  - Christian Lax wins the second Grand Prix RTL de la BD
  - According to reports, the Cartoon Network will not be commissioning a sixth series of the animated Teen Titans series
- November 30, 2005:
  - Slate magazine re-evaluate Watchmen in the wake of the release of the Absolute Watchmen edition
  - Debut of the Spanish web-comic Raruto by Jesus Garcia Ferrer.
- First issue of All-Star Superman, by Grant Morrison and Frank Quitely (DC Comics)
- Superman/Shazam: First Thunder by Judd Winick and Joshua Middleton (DC Comics).
- The fountain by Darren Aronofsky and Kent Williams (Vertigo).
- The law of the dollar by Jean Van Hamme and Philippe Francq (Largo Winch series ; Dupuis).
- Myrna: a sangue caldo by Giancarlo Berardi and Laura Zuccheri ; third confrontation between Julia and her nemesis, the serial-killer Myrna (Bonelli).
- First issue of Wondercity, an attempt to create an Italian superhero comic, conceived by Giovanni Gualdoni (Free Books).

=== December ===
- December 1, 2005:
  - Lorenzo Mattotti is awarded the Grand Prix by the jury at the Blois comics festival
  - Selected DC Comics superheroes are to appear on United States postage stamps in 2006
  - Four of the seven charges against comics retailer Gordon Lee have been dropped. Lee still faces three misdemeanor counts of Distribution of Harmful to Minors Material charges
- December 3, 2005:
  - The That's Life panel by Mike Twohy ends
  - Marvel Comics: The line of comics based upon Stephen King's Dark Tower series is to be pushed back until February 2007
- December 4, 2005: Pakisatini based group Jamaat-e-Islami, have placed a price of around €7,000 upon the head of what it believes to be one cartoonist of 12 cartoons. The cartoons were actually drawn by separate illustrators, and were solicited by Denmark newspaper Jyllands-Posten as part of an editorial point regarding commentary on public figures
- December 5, 2005:
  - It is reported that Fox are to make a sequel to this year's Fantastic Four movie, with a proposed release date of July 4, 2007
  - The Webcomics Examiner announces its Web comics of 2005
  - Les Mauvaises Gens, by Etienne Davodeau, wins Grand Prix de la Critique for 2005. The prize is awarded by L'Association des Critique et Journalistes de Bandes Dessinees
  - The trailer for X3 is launched online
- December 6, 2005:
  - ICv2 announces it is to host a Graphic Novel Conference at the New York Comic-Con
  - Chris Batista signs an exclusive agreement with DC Comics
  - It is reported Stephen King's role in the line of comics based on his Dark Tower series will be "Executive Editor and Creative Director"
  - Bill Jemas announces plans to launch a comic book line
- December 7, 2005:
  - The Angoulême Festival announces the nominees under consideration for awards at the 2006 festival. Charles Schulz, Jeff Smith, Chris Ware and Jaime Hernandez are amongst the many contenders
  - Italian cartoonist Gipi wins the Prix Goscinny, an annual prize awarded by jury and named in honour of René Goscinny
- December 8, 2005:
  - Pierre Wazem wins the Swiss Prix International de la Ville de Geneve
  - Warren Ellis is to revamp Marvel's New Universe line, originally launched in 1986 by Jim Shooter
  - Jonathan Shapiro, cartoonist for the Cape Times under the pen name Zapiro, wins the Principal Prince Claus Award
  - Canada's Doug Wright Awards are to become an annual affair
- December 9, 2005: Bill Griffith and James Sturm are interviewed by Washington Post comics page editor Suzanne Tobin online
- December 11, 2005: Roger Sabin reviews recent graphic novels in The Observer
- December 12, 2005:
  - American cartoonists participate in "Black Ink Monday", producing cartoons for publication based upon the decline in the number of newspapers which keep an editorial cartoonist on staff
  - Tom Spurgeon interviews Comic Book Legal Defense Fund Executive Director Charles Brownstein
- December 13, 2005: The Village Voice nominates three graphic novels within its favorite 25 books of the year
- December 14, 2005: Archie Goodwin and Al Williamson's run on the Flash Gordon strip is to be collected by Image Comics and Eva Ink Publishing
- December 15, 2005:
  - Marvel Comics settles its lawsuit with City of Heroes over trademark and copyright issues
  - The judges for the 2006 Eisner Awards are announced
- December 17, 2005:
  - Jacques Faizant, cartoonist on Le Figaro, retires
  - Andrew Arnold of Time opinion on the ten best comics works released in 2005
- December 19, 2005: It is reported that cartoonist Joe Martin is to launch his own syndicate to better promote his own work. He was previously syndicated by Tribune Media Services
- December 20, 2005:
  - Ben Katchor's new strip is to be debuted in The Forward
  - Comixpedia names its 25 People in Webcomics for 2005
- December 26, 2005:
  - Marvel Comics is to produce custom sized comic book inserts featuring Spider-Man for distribution via newspapers
- December 28, 2005:
  - Cartoonists Mike Luckovich and Mike Peters nominate some of their favorite editorial cartoons of the year
  - Audrey Puente reports on A New Golden Age of Comics for CBS
  - Kurt Busiek signs an exclusive two-year agreement with DC Comics
  - It is reported that Robert Crumb has filed suit against Amazon regarding usage of his Keep on Truckin' image
- December 29, 2005: A sale of cartoon art opens in London, with artwork of Dan Dare strips by Frank Hampson amongst the work offered for sale
- December 30, 2005:
  - Scott McCloud is planning to tour the United States in support of his forthcoming book, Making Comics
  - A Turkish court of appeal has overturned a decision which saw the newspaper Evrensel fined $8000 because of a cartoon by Sefer Selvi which caused Turkish Prime Minister Recep Tayyip Erdoğan to sue for defamation
- December 31, 2005:
  - Modern Tales announces it is to expand its operations and launch free webcomic strips, supported by advertising
- Infinite crisis by Geoff Johns and various pencillers (DC comics).
- Ultimate Wolverine vs. Hulk by Damon Lindelof and Leinif Francis Yu (Marvel).
- Marvel Zombies by Robert Kirkman and Sean Philips (Marvel)

=== Specific date unknown ===
- Barbara Brandon-Croft discontinues Where I'm Coming From.
- Dragon hunt by Richard Knaak and Kim Jae-hwan, first volume of Warcraft, the Sumwell trilogy (Tokyopop).
- Toon van Driel's celebrity comic about comedian André van Duin is discontinued.
- Jean-Pol, Wim Swerts and Luc Van Asten's celebrity comic based on Samson en Gert is discontinued. It had run since 1993.
- French comic artist Jean Graton is knighted in the Order of Leopold II.
- Andreas Rausch releases his graphic novel Zappaesk, about Frank Zappa.
- Questa è la stanza, graphic-novel by Gipi (Coconino press).
- In the magazine Daisuki, debut of the German manga Jibun-Jishin by Nina Werner.
- In the Spanish magazine El jueves, debut of the satirical strip Silvio Josè, the good parasite by Paco Alcàzar.

== Deaths ==
=== January ===
- January 2:
  - Frank Kelly Freas, American illustrator and comics artist (covers and advertising parodies for Mad), dies at age 82.
  - Alberto Salinas, Argentinean comic artist (Dago, Albatross), dies at age 72.
- January 3: Will Eisner, American comics writer, comics artist (Sheena, Queen of the Jungle, The Spirit, Contract with God) and author (Comics and Sequential Art, Graphic Storytelling and Visual Narrative), dies at age 87.
- January 5: Sean, a.k.a. John Klamik, Shawn or Buckshot, American activist and comics artist (made erotic comics for various gay magazines), dies at age 69 from lung cancer.
- January 9: Gui Laflamme, Canadian comic artist (Guy Benoît, Capitaine Nicolas Bonhomme), dies at age 77.
- January 10: Professeur Choron, French comedian, journalist, comics writer and singer (co-founder of Hara-Kiri and Charlie Hebdo), dies at age 75.
- January 25: Chad Grothkopf, American comics artist and animator (Hoppy the Marvel Bunny), dies at age 90 or 91.
- January 25: Jill Elgin, American illustrator and comics artist (continued Girl Commandos), dies at age 82.
- January 27: Peter Haars, German-Norwegian novelist, translator, illustrator and comics artist (Prokon, Happy Biff), dies at age 64.
- January 28: Daniel Branca, Argentine animator and comic artist (Barbeta y Grunchi, Sir Bombín, Caramelot, Disney comics), dies at age 53.
- January 29: Zika Mitrovic, Serbian-Yugoslav film director, scriptwriter and comics artist, dies at age 83.
- January 30: Pierre Forget, French comic artist (Thierry de Royaumont, Mic-Mac), dies at age 81.
- Specific date unknown: Jim Turnbull, Scottish comics artist, painter and political cartoonist (Pinky & Perky, continued Freddie the Frog and The Merry Tales of Mimi and Marny), dies at age 74.

=== February ===
- February 4: Eddie Sato, American comics artist (Dokie), dies at age 82.
- February 15: Dudu Geva, Israeli comics artist, cartoonist and caricaturist (The Duck), dies at age 54 from a heart attack.
- February 28: Umberto Manfrin, Italian comic artist (Ullaò, Devy Crock, Rolf Kauka comics, Hanna-Barbera comics, Felix the Cat comics, continued Tiramolla) dies at age 77.

=== March ===
- March 13: Hal Seeger, American animator, comics writer and comics artist (Batfink, Milton the Monster, assisted on the Betty Boop and Leave It to Binky comic strips), dies at age 87.

=== April ===
- April 5: Dale Messick, American comics artist (Brenda Starr), dies at age 98.
- April 8: Nevio Zeccara, Italian comics artist, dies at age 80.
- April 12: Peter Bramley, American art director and comics artist (worked for National Lampoon), dies at age 60.
- April 13: Juan Zanotto, Italian-Argentine comics artist (Bárbara, Yor (Henga)), dies at age 69.
- April 20: Ed Furness, Canadian comics artist (Freelance, Commander Steel), dies at age 94.
- April 22: Erika Fuchs, German comics translator (translated Carl Barks' Donald Duck comics in a colourful sophisticated way which had a profound impact on German language), dies at age 98.
- April 23: Romano Scarpa, Italian comics artist, writer and animator (Disney comics), dies at age 77.
- April 23: Walter Merhottein, Belgian puppet performer and brother of comics artist Merho, on whose puppets his main protagonist Marcel Kiekeboe from De Kiekeboes was based, dies at age 65.
- April 25: Ko Woo-young, South-Korean comics artist (Samgukji, Iljimae), dies at age 66.
- April 28: Zeke Zekley, American comics artist (assisted on Bringing Up Father), dies at age 90.
- April 29: Hugo Lous, Dutch journalist, novelist, illustrator and comics artist, dies at age 93.
- Specific date unknown: Olle Snismarck, Swedish comics artist (Lajban), dies at age 75.

=== May ===
- May 2: Sahap Ayhan, Turkish comics artist (Gültekin, Turkish versions of The Phantom and Flash Gordon), dies at age 78 or 79.
- May 4: Don Trachte, American comics artist (continued Henry), dies at age 89.
- May 8: Mehmet Gülergün, Turkish comic artist (worked for Rolf Kauka), dies at age 85.
- May 23: John Albano, American comics writer (co-creator of Jonah Hex), dies at age 82 from a heart attack.
- May 31: Eduardo Teixeira Coelho, a.k.a. ETC, a.k.a. Martin Sièvre, Portuguese comics artist and illustrator (Ragnar le Viking, Yves Le Loup, Ayak Le Loup Blanc, Robin Hood), dies at age 85.

=== June ===
- June 1: Willem van Malsen, Dutch painter, illustrator, writer, inventor and comics artist (Amoebe), dies at age 65.
- June 10: Shinji Nagashima, Japanese comics artist (Wanderer, Miracle Girl Limit-chan, Night on the Galactic Railroad), dies at age 67.
- June 17: Charlie Schlingo, French cartoonist (Josette de Rechange, Désiré Gogueneau, Tamponn Destartinn, Gogueneau), dies at age 49 from the result of an accidental fall.
- June 19: Selby Kelly, American animator and comic artist (worked on Pogo), dies at age 87.
- June 21: Harry Privette, aka Martin Hanna, American comics artist (MiniBoppers, Igor), dies at age 79 or 80.
- June 23: Sam Kweskin, American comics artist (Marvel Comics), dies at age 81.
- June 27: Owen McCarron, Canadian comics artist (Binkly and Doinke, worked for Marvel Comics), dies at age 70.

=== July ===
- July 1: Manuel Cuyás, Spanish comics artist (Cristina y sus Amigas), dies at age 83.
- July 7:
  - Paul Deliège, Belgian comics writer (Sam et l'Ours, Pétit-Cactus, Youk et Yak, Sibylline, Bonaventure, L'Envahisseur) and artist (Bobo, Les Krostons, Le Trou du Souffleur), dies at the age of 74.
  - Rudy van Giffen, Indonesian-Dutch comics artist (Vliegtuig Vermist), dies at age 74.
- July 9: Ann Brewster, American comics artist and illustrator (worked on Sheena, Queen of the Jungle), dies at age 86.
- July 19: Jim Aparo, American comics artist (DC Comics), dies at age 72.
- July 22:
  - Jerry Marcus, American comics artist (Trudy), dies at age 81.
  - Hinako Sugiura, Japanese comics/manga artist, dies at age 46 from throat cancer.
- July 27: Marten Toonder, Dutch comics writer, artist (Tom Poes, Panda, Kappie, Koning Hollewijn), publisher and animator, dies at age 93.

=== August ===
- August 1: Wim Boost, aka Wibo, Dutch comics artist, cartoonist and animator, dies at age 97.
- August 10: Mar Amongo, Filipino comics artist (DC Comics), dies at age 68.

=== September ===
- September 10: Carlos Costantini, Argentine comic artist and animator (Doña Tele, Barbeta y Grunchi, Mac Perro), dies at age 69.
- September 13: Raymond Chiavarino, a.k.a. Maric, French comics artist and writer (wrote, among others for Les Pieds Nickelés, Valentin and Bibi Fricotin), dies at the age of 78.
- September 16: F. K. Waechter, German cartoonist and comics artist, dies at age 67.
- September 21: Mort Leav, American comics artist (co-creator of The Heap), dies at age 89.
- September 26: Mickey Siporin, American cartoonist, dies at age 65.
- Specific date unknown: Horn, Belgian cartoonist and comics artist (Jim et sa Bande, Le Week-end Sportif), died at age 95.

=== October ===
- October 8: Fernando Bonini, aka Sil, Brazilian comics artist (worked for Vecchi, Disney comics and Heavy Metal Comics), dies at age 50.
- October 9: Ian Gammidge, British comic writer (The Flutters, Ruggles, Mr. Digwell, The Larks, Little Joe, Jane) and cartoonist (Gammidge Bargain Basement), dies at age 89.
- October 17: Tom Gill, American comics artist (continued The Lone Ranger), dies at age 92.
- October 21: Bob White, American comics artist (Archie Comics, Pat the Brat, Cosmo the Merry Martian), dies at age 76 or 77.
- October 24: Bill Fraccio, American comics artist (Charlton Comics), dies at age 85.
- October 26: Michael Kilian, American journalist, author and comics writer (continued Dick Tracy), dies at age 66.

=== November ===
- November 7: Harry Thompson, British comedy writer, radio and TV producer, novelist and biographer (author of Tintin: Hergé and his Creation), dies at age 45 from cancer.
- November 11: Lucho Olivera, Argentine comics artist (Nippur de Lagash), dies at age 63.
- November 20: Lou Myers, American cartoonist (worked for The New Yorker), dies at age 90.
- November 21: David Austin, British cartoonist (Hom Sap), dies at age 70.
- November 26: Stan Berenstain, American writer and illustrator (co-creator of The Berenstain Bears), dies at age 82.
- November 30:
  - Jim Sasseville, American comics artist (assistant on Peanuts and It's Only a Game), dies at age 78.
  - Hella Schiefer, Austrian illustrator and comics artist (worked for Unsere Zeitung), dies at age 81.

=== December ===
- December 7: Ben van 't Klooster, Dutch comics artist (Toonder Studios), dies at age 81.
- December 18: Rafael Fornés Collado, Cuban comics artist (José Dolores), dies at age 88.
- December 26,: Bud Blake, American comics artist (Tiger), dies age 87.
- December 29: Henk Sprenger, Dutch comics artist (Piloot Storm, Kick Wilstra), dies at age 85.
- December 30: Jean Ollivier, French comics writer and chief editor of Vaillant, dies at age 80.
- December 31:
  - Maurice Dodd, British comics writer and artist (continued The Perishers), dies at age 83.
  - John Johns, American caricaturist and comics artist (made a one-shot comic for Mad Magazine), dies at age 84.

=== Specific date unknown ===
- Roberto Battaglia, Argentine comics artist (Don Pascual), dies at age 81 or 82.
- Luc De Ro, A.K.A. Robert Berghmans, Belgian painter and comics artist (Charlepoeng), dies at age 89 or 90.
- Harry Gladstone, American comics writer and artist (Disney comics), dies at age 67 or 68.
- Andy Sprague, American comic artist (Honeybelle, assisted on The Adventures of Smilin' Jack, Abbie an' Slats), dies at 83 or 84.

== Conventions ==
- January 22–23: Big Apple Comic Con I (Penn Plaza Pavilion, New York City)
- January 29: FLUKE Mini-Comics & Zine Festival (Tasty World, Athens, Georgia)
- February 5–6: Emerald City Comicon (Qwest Field Event Center, Seattle, Washington) — guests include Adam Kubert, Jhonen Vasquez, Tony Harris, Josh Middleton, Travis Charest, Cary Nord, Steve McNiven, Mike Choi, Russ Heath, Michael Lark, David Finch, Eric Powell, Dustin Nguyen, Roy Thomas, Andy Owens, Drew Johnson, Pete Woods, Jason Pearson, Tim Sale, Brian Michael Bendis, Kurt Busiek, Robert Kirkman, Jim Cheung, Ed Brubaker, Sean Chen, Peter Bagge, Jim Woodring, Greg Rucka, Alex Maleev, Scott Kurtz, Crab Scrambly, Dexter Vines, Gail Simone, Jay Faerber, John Layman, Ford Gilmore, David Hahn, Matthew Clark, Tom Peyer, Karl Kesel, Rebecca Woods, Jeff Parker, Steve Lieber, Ron Randall, Paul Guinan, Steve Rolston, Takeshi Miyazawa, Dave Stewart, Matt Haley, Bill Schelly, and Steve Sadowski
- February 12–13: Dallas Comic Con ("DCC5") (Richardson Civic Center, Richardson, Texas) — guests include Bernie Wrightson, Tim Bradstreet, Steve Niles, Mark Brooks, Jaime Mendoza, Scott Kurtz, Todd Nauck, Raven Gregory, Cal Slayton, and Brian Denham
- February 18–20: WonderCon (Moscone Center, San Francisco, California)
- February 25–27: MegaCon (Orange County Convention Center, Orlando, Florida) — guests include Mark Waid, Mike Deodato, George Pérez, Michael Avon Oeming, Chuck Dixon, Wilson Tortosa, Aaron Lopresti, Marv Wolfman, Ethan Van Sciver, Monte Moore, Phil Jimenez, Tone Rodriguez, Michael T. Gilbert, Roy Thomas, Dan Brereton, Allen Bellman, Gene Colan, George Tuska, Tommy Castillo, Andy Runton, Jinky Coronado, David Campiti, Lou Ferrigno, George Lowe, Richard Hatch, and Gil Gerard
- March 5: STAPLE! (BPOE #201, Austin, Texas) — first edition of this convention; guests: Shannon Wheeler, Scott Kurtz, Terry Moore, and Michael Lark
- March 19: UK Web & Mini Comix Thing (Mile End, London, UK) — 2nd annual event, organized by Patrick Findlay
- March 18–20: Wizard World Los Angeles (Los Angeles, California) — 24,000 attendees
- April: Phoenix Comicon (Glendale, Arizona) — official guests: Todd Nauck and Marv Wolfman
- April 1–3: Big Apple Comic Con II (Penn Plaza Pavilion, New York City)
- April 9–10: Alternative Press Expo (Concourse Exhibition Center, San Francisco, California)
- April 16: Small Press and Alternative Comics Expo (S.P.A.C.E.) (Ohio Expo Center, Rhodes Center, Columbus, Ohio) — special guests: Dave Sim and Gerhard
- April 22: Toronto ComiCON Fan Appreciation Event (Metro Toronto Convention Centre, Toronto, Ontario, Canada)
- April 22–24: Pittsburgh Comicon (Pittsburgh Expomart, Monroeville, Pennsylvania) — official guests: George Pérez, Tom DeFalco, Ron Frenz, Michael Kaluta, Joseph Michael Linsner, Scott McDaniel, Jimmy Palmiotti, Howard Porter, Mark Texeira, Tom Smith, Michael Turner, and Sal Buscema
- April 29–May 1: Toronto Comic Con ("Paradise Comics Toronto Comicon") (National Trade Centre, Hall F, Toronto, Ontario, Canada) — guests of honor: Brian Michael Bendis, Warren Ellis, and Jerry Robinson
- May 13–15: Motor City Comic Con (Novi, Michigan)
- May 13–14: East Coast Black Age of Comics Convention (African American Museum in Philadelphia and Ritter Hall [Temple University], Philadelphia, Pennsylvania) — convention expands to two days
- May 14–15: Comic Expo (British Empire & Commonwealth Exhibition Hall/Ramada Plaza Hotel, Bristol, United Kingdom) — guests include J. Michael Straczynski, Michael Avon Oeming, Gary Frank, Dave Gibbons, Alan Davis, Brian Bolland, Mike Ploog and Simon Bisley; 2,000 attendees
- May 27–29: Toronto Comic Arts Festival (Toronto, Ontario, Canada)
- June 3–5: Wizard World Philadelphia (Philadelphia Convention Center, Philadelphia, Pennsylvania) — 27,000 attendees; guest of honor: J. Michael Straczynski
- June 11–12: MoCCA Festival (Puck Building, New York City)
- June 17–18: Big Apple Comic Con III (Penn Plaza Pavilion, New York City)
- June 18–19: Adventure Con 4 (Knoxville Convention Center, Knoxville, Tennessee)
- June 24–26: Heroes Convention (Charlotte Convention Center, Charlotte, North Carolina) — guests include Jim Amash, Robert Atkins, Michael Bair, Christian Beranek, Jackson Bostwick, June Brigman, Mark Brooks, Bob Burden, Nick Cardy, Richard Case, John Cassaday, Howard Chaykin, Cliff Chiang, Dave Cockrum, Paty Cockrum, Gene Colan, Steve Conley, Shane Davis, Kim DeMulder, Todd Dezago, Tommy Lee Edwards, Tom Feister, Ken Gale, Dick Giordano, Brandon Graham, Cully Hamner, Tony Harris, Irwin Hasen, Greg Horn, Paul Hornschemeier, Adam Hughes, Jamal Igle, James Jean, Georges Jeanty, Paul Jenkins, Nat Jones, Richard Kiel, James Kochalka, Scott Kurtz, Jason Latour, John Paul Leon, Rick Leonardi, John Lucas, Jonathan Luna, Joshua Luna, David W. Mack, Jim Mahfood, Nathan Massengill, Jeff Mason, Ed McGuinness, Mercedes McNab, Pop Mhan, Joshua Middleton, Chris Moreno, Phil Noto, James O'Barr, Tom Palmer, Jason Pearson, Brandon Peterson, Chris Pitzer, Mike Ploog, Paul Pope, Joe Pruett, Joe Quesada, Budd Root, Don Rosa, Craig Rousseau, Josef Rubinstein, Andy Runton, Alex Saviuk, Scott L. Schwartz, Marie Severin, Dash Shaw, Joe Staton, Brian Stelfreeze, Arthur Suydam, Mark Texeira, Roy Thomas, Tim Townsend, Herb Trimpe, Rob Ullman, Ethan Van Sciver, Mercy Van Vlack, Dexter Vines, Mike Wieringo, Renée Witterstaetter, and Marv Wolfman
- June 25–26: London Film and Comic Con (Earls Court Exhibition Centre, London, England, UK)
- July 14–17: San Diego Comic-Con (San Diego Convention Center, San Diego, California) — 103,000 attendees; official guests: Lalo Alcaraz, Lee Ames, Sy Barry, Bob Bolling, Bruce Campbell, Nick Cardy, Greg Evans, Bob Fujitani, Pia Guerra, Ray Harryhausen, Phil Jimenez, Robert Jordan, David Lapham, Richard Morgan, Gary Panter, Eric Powell, Lou Scheimer, J. J. Sedelmaier, Dexter Taylor, Brian K. Vaughan, and James Warren
- July 30–31: "Bargain Basement CAPTION" (Wolfson College, Oxford, England)
- August 5–7: Wizard World Chicago (Rosemont Convention Center, Rosemont, Illinois)
- August 26–28: Fan Expo Canada (Metro Toronto Convention Centre, Toronto, Ontario, Canada) — 39,753 attendees; guests include Elijah Wood, Clive Barker, Gary Gygax, James Marsters, Kevin Sorbo, Crispin Glover, Marina Sirtis, Adam Baldwin, Erica Durance, Margot Kidder, Kenny Baker, Elvira, J. Michael Straczynski, Frank Quitely, Mark Bagley, Greg Land, Neal Adams, Jhonen Vasquez, and Peter Laird
- September 2–5: Dragon Con (Hyatt Regency Atlanta/Marriott Marquis/Atlanta Hilton, Atlanta, Georgia) — 20,000+ attendees; guests include Robert Jordan, Anne McCaffrey, Basil Gogos, and Jonathan Harris
- September 6–11: Jornadas de Cómic (Aviles, Spain)
- September 17–18: Big Apple Comic Con IV (Penn Plaza Pavilion, New York City)
- September 23–24: Small Press Expo (Holiday Inn Select, Bethesda, Maryland)
- September 30–October 2: Wizard World Boston (Bayside Expo Center, Dorchester, MA) — guests include John Cassaday, Lou Ferrigno, and Marc Silvestri
- September 30: Komikazen (Ravenna, Italy) — first iteration of the nonfiction comics festival; guests include Phoebe Gloeckner, Joe Sacco, and Marjane Satrapi
- October 1: Stumptown Comics Fest (Smith Memorial Ballroom, Portland, Oregon) — 80 exhibitor tables; 450 attendees
- October 13–15: International Comics and Animation Festival (ICAF) (Library of Congress, Washington, D.C.) — guests include Kevin Kallaugher, Ann Telnaes, Tom Toles, Jerry Robinson, Paul Grist, and Benjamin Herzberg
- October 14–15: Comics Salon (Bratislava, Slovakia)
- October 15–16: Dallas Comic Con ("DCC6") (Plano Centre, Plano, Texas) — guests include Mark Brooks, Ale Garza, Cliff Chiang, Rich Buckler, Terry Moore, Michael Lark, James O'Barr, Kerry Gammill, Jaime Mendoza, Cat Staggs, Cynthia Cummiens, David Hopkins, Ben Dunn, and Baldo writer Hector Cantú
- October 26: Comica — London International Comics Festival (Institute of Contemporary Arts, London, UK) — organized by Paul Gravett; guests include Jessica Abel, Matt Madden, Igort, Paul Wright, Killoffer, Junko Mizuno
- November 4–6: Wizard World Texas (Arlington Convention Center, Arlington, Texas) — guests include Dan Didio, Ethan Van Sciver, Rob Liefeld, Peter David, Buddy Saunders, Margot Kidder, Sean Astin, and Ron Perlman
- November 18–20: Big Apple National Comic Book Art, and Toy Show (Penn Plaza Pavilion, New York City) — guests include Neal Adams, Dick Giordano, Adam Hughes, Paul Chadwick, Sam Kieth, Dave Sim, Jim Starlin, Dean Haspiel, Harvey Pekar, Spain Rodriguez, S. Clay Wilson, Dan Fogel, Jim Woodring, Kim Deitch, Michael Kaluta, Charles Vess, Walt Simonson, Arthur Suydam, Jim Krueger, Michael Avon Oeming, Joseph Michael Linsner, Mitchell Breitweiser, William Tucci, Ken Kelly, Lee Weeks, Mark Schultz, Tania del Rio, Arthur Adams, Michael Lark, Dick Ayers, Danny Fingeroth, Jim Salicrup, Rich Buckler, Mark Texeira, William H. Foster, III, Jim Muniz, Tim Vigil, Joe Vigil, David Quinn, Mirage Studios, Joe Staton, Josh Neufeld, John Lucas, and Ed Piskor
- November 19–20: Comic Expo (Metropole Hilton, Brighton, United Kingdom) — guests include Mark Millar, Gilbert Shelton, Dave Gibbons, Sydney Jordan, and Harry Harrison
- November 25–26: Mid-Ohio Con (Columbus Hilton Easton, Columbus, Ohio) — 25th anniversary show

== Exhibitions and shows ==
- April 23–September 26: Charles M. Schulz Museum (Santa Rosa, California) — Top Dogs: Comic Canines Before and After Snoopy, curated by Patrick McDonnell
- June 29–October 16: Art Gallery of Ontario (Toronto, Ontario, Canada) — Present Tense: Seth
- September 8–October 22: A+D Gallery of Columbia College Chicago — The Cartoonist's Eye, exhibition of 75 artists' work, including Charles M. Schulz, Robert Crumb, Daniel Clowes, Seth, and Chris Ware, curated by Ivan Brunetti
- November 20, 2005 – March 12, 2006: Hammer Museum and the Museum of Contemporary Art, Los Angeles (MOCA) (Los Angeles) — Masters of American Comics, featuring the work of Winsor McCay, Lyonel Feininger, George Herriman, E. C. Segar, Frank King, Chester Gould, Milton Caniff, and Charles M. Schulz at the Hammer Museum; and Will Eisner, Jack Kirby, Harvey Kurtzman, Robert Crumb, Art Spiegelman, Gary Panter, and Chris Ware at MOCA; curated by John Carlin and Brian Walker

== First issues by title ==
These comic books were the first issued in each series.

Apocalypse Nerd
Released: January by Dark Horse Comics. Writer & Artist: Peter Bagge
Archaic
Released: May by Fenickx Productions LLC. Writer: James S. Abrams. Artist: Brett Marting
Batman: Dark Detective
Released: May 4 by DC Comics. Writer: Steve Englehart. Artists: Marshall Rogers and Terry Austin.
Blade for Barter
Release: February by Seven Seas Entertainment. Writer: Jason DeAngelis Artist: Honoel A. Ibardolaza
Daredevil vs. Punisher
Release: July 6 by Marvel Comics (Marvel Knights imprint). Writer & Artist: David Lapham.
Fantastic Four: House of M
Release: July 6 by Marvel Comics. Writer: John Layman. Artist: Scot Eaton.
Great Lakes Avengers
Release: April 6 by Marvel Comics. Writer: Dan Slott. Artist: Paul Pelletier.
House of M
Release: June 1 by Marvel Comics. Writer: Brian Michael Bendis. Artist: Olivier Coipel.
Hunter-Killer
Release: March 17 by Top Cow Productions. Writer: Mark Waid. Artist: Marc Silvestri.
Young Avengers
Release: February 9 by Marvel Comics. Writer: Allan Heinberg. Artist: Jim Cheung.
Young Avengers #1 "Director's Cut"
Release: March 16 by Marvel Comics.

== Footnotes ==
^{1} Ratings are provided by the publisher: Marvel Comics ratings.
