= Cybersix (TV series) =

Canadian-Japanese-Argentine animated television series

- Show logo featuring Cybersix and Data-7.
- Genre: Action; Science fiction Spy
- Created by: Carlos Meglia; Carlos Trillo
- Based on: Cybersix by Carlos Meglia and Carlos Trillo
- Developed by: Barry Whittaker; Judy Valyi
- Directed by: Toshihiko Masuda (series director)
- Creative director: Makoto Shiraishi
- Voices of: Cathy Weseluck; Michael Dobson; Alex Doduk; Terry Klassen; Scott McNeil
- Opening theme: Lyrics by Robert Olivier; Sung by Coral Egan; Music by Robbi Finkel
- Composer: Robbi Finkel
- Countries of origin: Canada; Japan; Argentina
- Original languages: English; Japanese; Spanish
- No. of seasons: 1
- No. of episodes: 13

Production
- Executive producers: Herve Bedard; Shunzo Kato
- Producers: Carole Ducharme; Koji Takeuchi
- Running time: 22 minutes
- Production companies: Network of Animation; TMS Entertainment

Original release
- Network: Teletoon (Canada); Kids Station (Japan); Telefe (Argentina)
- Release: September 6 – October 23, 1999

Cybersix, also written as CyberSix, is an animated television series based on an Argentine comic strip series of the same name created by Argentine authors Carlos Trillo (story) and Carlos Meglia (art). The series was a co-production between Vancouver-based studio Network of Animation and Japan-based studio TMS Entertainment. Many of the comic's darker themes had to be toned down for the show in order to make it appropriate for all audiences. The series originally aired on Teletoon in Canada, Kids Station in Japan, Telefe in Argentina and Fox Kids in the United States.

The music for the series was composed by Robbi Finkel. Its opening and ending songs were composed by Finkel with lyrics by Robert Olivier and sung by jazz vocalist Coral Egan. On May 6, 2000 Cybersix won "Best Animated Production" and "Best Overall Sound of an Animated Production" at the Leo Awards. On April 28, 2001, the series won "Special Mention for the Best Science Fiction Program" at the Pulcinella Awards in Italy for that year's competition.

== Plot ==
A leather-clad female gynoid named Cybersix protects the town of Meridiana at night. She fights the machinations of her creator and scientist Dr. Von Reichter, his cloned son José, and their henchmen the Fixed Ideas, who resemble Frankenstein's monster. Cybersix is aided by her fellow creation in the form of a black panther named Data-7. During the day, she poses as a male teacher named Adrian Seidelman and accompanies biology teacher Lucas Amato.

== Cast ==
- Cathy Weseluck as Cybersix / Adrian Seidelman
- Michael Dobson as Lucas Amato, Fixed Ideas
- Alex Doduk as José
- Terry Klassen as Dr. Von Reichter
- Scott McNeil as Data-7

=== Additional voices ===
- Brian Drummond as Yashimoto (in "Yashimoto, Private Eye")
- Andrew Francis as Julian (in "Data-7 & Julian")
- L. Harvey Gold as Terra (in "Terra")
- Janyse Jaud as Lori Anderson, Elaine (in "Full Moon Fascination"), Grizelda (in "Daylight Devil")
- Chantal Strand as Ikiko (in "Brainwashed")

== Production ==
Each episode had a production budget of US$360,000. The series was cancelled after the first season due to conflicts with the studio.

== Episodes ==
No.	Title	Directed by	Written by	Original release date
1	"Mysterious Shadow"	Keiichiro Furuya	Andrew D. Hammell; Story by : Koji Takeuchi	September 6, 1999
Science teacher Lucas Amato befriends his new co-worker Adrian Seidelman, unaware that Adrian is actually a gynoid lab experiment known as Cybersix. They work together to defeat Fixed Ideas, creatures created by Cybersix's creator, Von Reichter, and prevent his son José from having counterfeiting scam.
2	"Data-7 & Julian"	Keiko Oyamada	Andrew D. Hammell; Story by : Koji Takeuchi	September 12, 1999
Adrian meets Julian, a homeless and orphan boy who is forced to steal and survive. Julian ends up in the middle of Josè's latest attack while Cybersix persuades him. At the same time, she meets Data-7, a black panther infused with the DNA and memories of Cyber-29, Cybersix's brother whom Reichter sent.
3	"Terra"	Keiichiro Furuya	Catherine Donahue Girzyc; Story by : Koji Takeuchi	September 18, 1999
As Cybersix wonders what it would be like to go on a date with Lucas, Reichter summons Terra, a mud monster assimilating other abilities. After failing to reason themselves, Terra sacrifices himself to save Cybersix from the burning tower.
4	"Yashimoto, Private Eye"	Nobuo Tomizawa	Barry Whittaker and Judy Valyi	September 19, 1999
Local detective Yashimoto is blackmailed by José into solving the case about Cybersix, after his sister Ikkio and Julian are kidnapped. After finding her, Cybersix and Yashimoto work together to defeat the giant kraken.
5	"Lori is Missing"	Keiichiro Furuya	Jono Howard	September 25, 1999
Lori, one of the students falls in love with Adrian, and manages to find where he lives. In doing so, she sees Adrian as Cybersix, coming to the conclusion the two are dating. When discussing this with Lucas, he feels betrayed by Adrian. However, the two reconcile and save Lori, who got caught while José and the Fixed Ideas attempt to rob a bank.
6	"Blue Birds of Horror"	Keiichiro Furuya	Terry Klassen; Story by : Koji Takeuchi	September 26, 1999
When José uses the broadcast network antenna and turns a flock of local bluebirds hostile, Cybersix and Lucas infiltrate the station.
7	"Brainwashed"	Mayumi Masaji	Michael Van Lane; Story by : Koji Takeuchi	October 2, 1999
Six detectives are brainwashed by José's mind-controlling device, one of which is a friend of Julian. However, Cybersix saves them.
8	"Gone With the Wings"	Keiko Oyamada	Terry Klassen	October 3, 1999
When Von Reichter deploys a flock of night goblins incapable of staying in sunlight, Cybersix finds the eggs, the main source of goblins near the train rail.
9	"The Eye"	Atsuko Tanaka	Jono Howard	October 10, 1999
José discovers an eyeball creature draining consciousness from everyone and growing bigger. Cybersix freezes it with the tank of liquid nitrogen and the explosion destroys it, restoring the city's populace.
10	"Full Moon Fascination"	Keiko Oyamada	Barry Whittaker	October 9, 1999
Adrian feels jealous when a new co-worker, Elaine befriends Lucas. However, Cybersix learns that Elaine is a werewolf, and Lucas is transformed for the same experiment.
11	"The Greatest Show in Meridiana"	Keiko Oyamada	Terry Klassen	October 16, 1999
José forces Cybersix and Data-7 to star in the robotic animal circus show, but the plan fails after Cybersix, Data-7, and Lucas destroy the circus.
12	"Daylight Devil"	Hiroyuki Aoyama	Judi Vayli	October 17, 1999
Richter sends out a reptilian woman named Griselda to take down Cybersix next. However, this becomes problematic when she targets Adrian during a field trip.
13	"The Final Confrontation"	Toshihiko Masuda	Barry Whittaker & Judy Valyi	October 23, 1999
When Reichter sends a giant moving bomb to the city, Cybersix feels this may be her final battle, revealing her identity to Lori and kissing Lucas goodbye. While confronting her creator, Cybersix is given the opportunity to live without the need for substance, something that José is not fond of.

== Home media ==
The series was released in English on DVD by Discotek Media in North America on 26 August 2014. The box set features commentary by Cathy Weseluck and Brady Hartel on episodes 1 and 13, liner notes on episodes 4 and 11, textless opening and ending animations, and the television pilot. The series was released on Blu-ray by Discotek Media on 31 October 2023.

== Reception ==
The Encyclopedia of Science Fiction described Cybersix as an entertaining series with reasonable characterization and attractive animation, while noting that it was aimed at a younger audience than the darker and more thematically complex comic book on which it was based. It highlighted how the adaptation downplayed the source material's darker elements, including Von Reichter's background as a Nazi war criminal, Cybersix's trauma surrounding her creation and attempted termination, and the disturbing, vampiric nature of her need to feed on Von Reichter's creations. The encyclopedia also observed that the anime sometimes retains the comic's dramatic visual style, comparing Cybersix's presentation to more serious incarnations of Batman, but considered this an occasionally uneasy contrast with the television series' more slapstick elements.
