= Juan Giménez =

Argentine comic book artist (1943–2020)

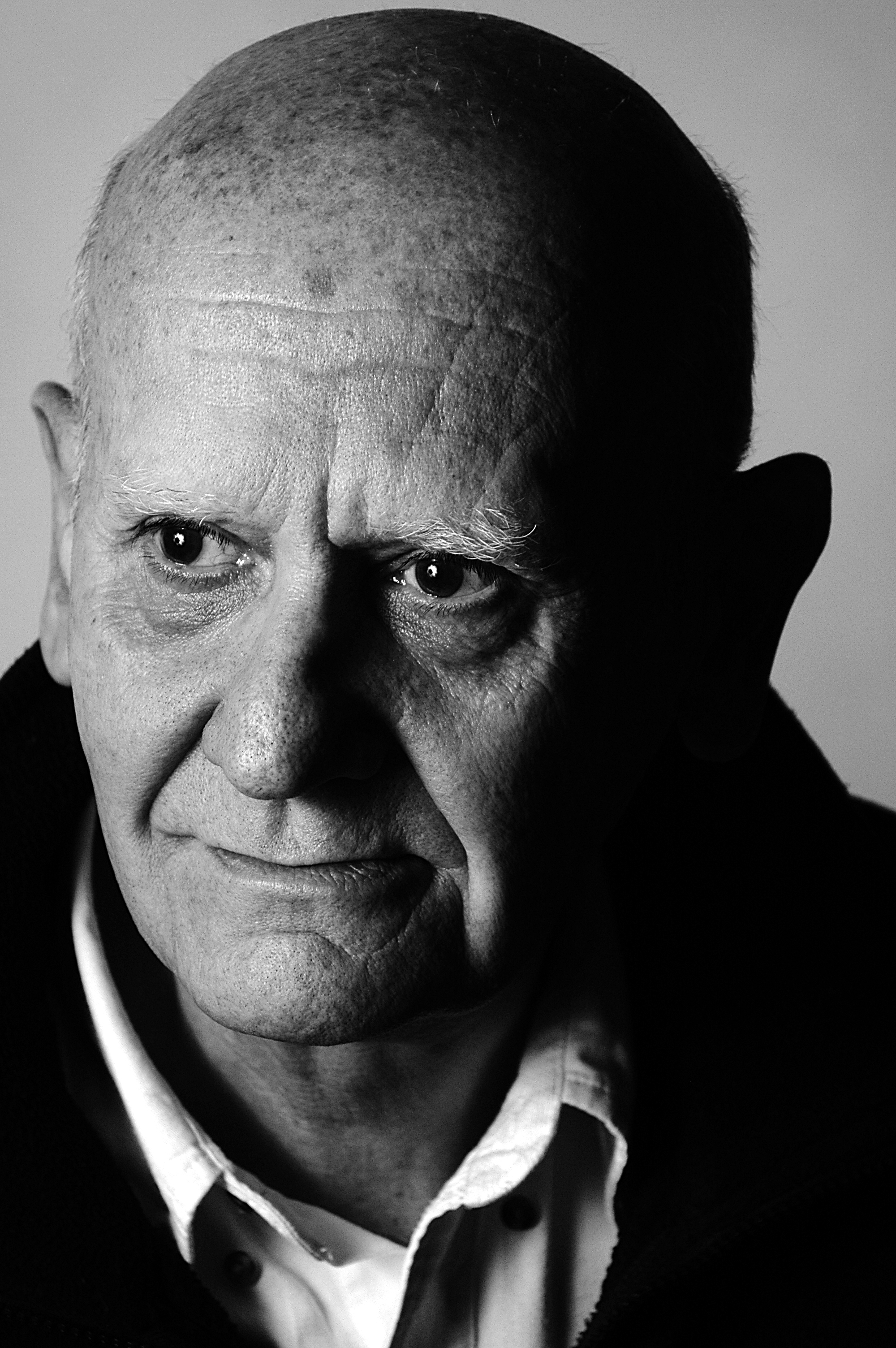
- Giménez in 2006
- Born: 26 November 1943 Mendoza, Argentina
- Died: 2 April 2020 (aged 76) Mendoza, Argentina
- Area: Comic book artist
- Notable works: Metabarons

Juan Antonio Giménez López ([ˈxwaŋ xiˈmenes]; 26 November 1943 – 2 April 2020) was an Argentine comic book artist and writer, most recognized for his detailed machine-like imagery. Among his noted works include stories for the French Métal Hurlant and the Argentinian L'Eternauta magazines, and the comic series Metabarons co-developed by Alejandro Jodorowsky.

== Biography ==
Giménez López was born in Mendoza, Argentina. He finished his high school education as an industrial designer. He then attended the National University of Cuyo's School of Arts and Design followed by the Academy of Fine Arts in Barcelona. While his early professional career was spent in advertising, with writing and drawing comics as a side activity, he eventually moved into comics as a full-time profession by his thirties.

Giménez had started getting his own stories published when he was sixteen years old in Argentine magazines Frontera, Misterix and Hora Cero. His first stories, for Argentine editors such as Colomba and Record, were largely inspired by Hugo Pratt (during the years he spent in Argentina) and Francisco Solano López. Back to Spain, he worked for the Spanish magazines Zona 84 and Comix International, and Italian (Lanciostory, Skorpio) magazines. His work of this period is mainly related to war and science-fiction genres. He published his first French release Leo Roa (The Starr Conspiracy) in 1979.

In 1980, he designed the "Harry Canyon" segment of the film Heavy Metal. During the 1980s, he collaborated with several European magazines, including Josep Toutain's Spanish edition of 1984, the French Métal Hurlant and the Italian L'Eternauta magazines, experimenting with graphical and narrative innovations.

To this period dates what is ranked among his best series, the short science-fiction stories known under the title of Time Paradox. Also noteworthy are Ciudad, written by Ricardo Barreiro, and Le Quatrième Pouvoir (The Fourth Power), which he wrote by himself.

Giménez's style has become famous for the extreme attention he devotes to technical and historical details; his series Pik As has been defined as "a comic encyclopedia of World War II."

Giménez also collaborated with important authors such as Carlos Trillo, Emilio Balcarce, and Roberto Dal Prà. One of his most famous collaborations was with Chilean Alejandro Jodorowsky for the popular Metabarons comic series started in 1992 and ran through 2003 published by Humanoids. The work was based on characters that had appeared in Jodorowsky's and Jean Giraud's The Incal, and adapted elements that Jodorowsky had been planning to use in a film adaption of Frank Herbert's Dune. Giménez' art for the series was praised for spanning the vast vision and range that Jodorowsky had set up. Jodorowsky said on Giménez's death: "I closely collaborated with Juan Giménez for 10 years and together, we created The Metabarons saga. What facilitated my task as we offered him to work on the complex world of the Metabarons was that he already embodied the immortal No-Name, the last Metabaron. In my unconscious, Juan Giménez cannot die. He will continue on, drawing like the master warrior that he was."

Giménez was recognized with the Yellow Kid Award for Best Foreign Artist at the 1990 Lucca International Comic Fair, and the Gaudia Award at the 1990 Feria Internacional del Comics de Barcelone, among others.

He died in Mendoza on 2 April 2020, from COVID-19; he had been hospitalized since 22 March having recently returned from a trip to Sitges, Spain where it was believed he had been infected.
