= Enrique Alcatena =

Argentine comic book artist (born 1957)

- Born: 26 February 1957 (age 69) Buenos Aires, Argentina
- Area: Artist
- Pseudonym: Quique
- Notable works: Batman: Legends of the Dark Knight; Batman: Leatherwing; Skorpio; Conan the Savage

Enrique Alcatena (born 26 February 1957) is an Argentine comic book artist. He is known as Quique Alcatena in his native country and Latin America.

== Biography ==
A self-taught artist, Alcatena began his career in the 1970s as an assistant of artista Chiche Medrano and working for the Argentine publisher Ediciones Récord; his first signed work, Bushido, appeared in Récord's anthology magazine Pif Paf in 1976. In 1982 he started to work for the children's magazine Anteojito where his work was mostly surreal fantasy full of mythology. Starting from the late 1970s, Alcatena also collaborate with British comics publishers, including DC Thomson. English -language works by Alcatena include several historical magazines and the science fiction/fantasy series Starblazer.

In the 1980s, his works also appeared in Argentine magazines such as Skorpio: series for which he provided art include El Mago, written by Ricardo Barreiro, and Merlin, written by Robin Wood, as well as numerous series and single stories written by Eduardo Mazzitelli, a writer he would collaborate with numerous times during his career. Many of these collaborations were published directly in Italian by Eura Editoriale magazines Lanciostory and Skorpio.

After drawing for DC Comics and annual of Adventures of Superman (1987) and the miniseries Hawkworld (1989), in the following decade he worked again for DC and other American comic publishers including Marvel and Dark Horse. Among several other titles, he illustrated issues of Batman: Legends of the Dark Knight, Adventures of Superman, Conan the Savage, Green Lantern, The Flash, and Predator vs. Judge Dredd vs. Aliens: Incubus and Other Stories.

== Bibliography ==
Comics work includes:

=== Argentina publishers ===
- El Mundo Subterráneo
- Los Viajes de Faustus
- Pesadillas (Ediciones Record)
- Skorpio #134 (La Fortaleza Olvidada) (1987); #141-144 (La Fortaleza Móvil) (1987–88) (with Barreiro) (Ediciones Record)
- Ulrik El Negro

=== DC ===
- Adventures of Superman Annual #9
- Batman Chronicles #6, 11 (with Chuck Dixon)
- Batman of Arkham (one-shot, Elseworlds) (with Alan Grant, 2000)
- Batman: Legends of the Dark Knight #89-90 (with Alan Grant, 1996–97); Annual #5 (with Chuck Dixon, 1995)
- DCU Holiday Bash III (anthology, four-page Bat Lash story, with Chuck Dixon, 1999)
- Detective Comics Annual #7 - Batman: Leatherwing (one-shot, Elseworlds) (with Chuck Dixon, 1994)
- Flash (vol. 2) Annual #13
- Green Lantern (vol. 3) Annual #5 (with Chuck Dixon, 1996)
- Green Lantern/Sinestro Corps Secret Files (2008)
- L.E.G.I.O.N '93 #51 (with Alan Grant, 1993)

=== Marvel ===
- Conan #10-11 (script by Larry Hama, 1996)
- Conan the Savage #1-6, 9, 1995–96)
- Doom 2099 #13
- What If? (vol. 2) #78
- X-Man #74-75 (script by Steven Grant, 2001)

=== Other publishers ===
- Brath #6, 11 (with Chuck Dixon, Crossgen, 2003–04)
- El Libro Secreto de Marco Polo (with Ricardo Barreiro)
- Judge Dredd Megazine (vol. 3) #36-38
- Predator vs Judge Dredd #1-3 (mini-series) (with John Wagner, Dark Horse Comics, 1997)
- The Spider: Reign of the Vampire King #1-3 (mini-series) (with Timothy Truman, Eclipse Comics, 1992)
- Starblazer: (D.C. Thomson & Co.) #7, 175, 179, 277 (with Mike Knowles, #16, 24, 125 (with J. Albert), #29, 59 (with W. Webb), #31, 54, 62, 77, 81, 166-167, 170 (with Ray Aspden), #32 (with M. Chamberlain), #36 (with S. Neeld), 45, 127, 177 (with Grant Morrison), 47 (with C. Shelborne), 49, 75, 122, 154, 162 (with W. Reed), 56 (with S. Neeld), 66 (with J. Speer), #64, 141, 200, 271 (with Mike Chinn), 88 (with M. Stall), 144 (with R.H. Bonsall), 149 (with M. Furnass), 161 (with N. Jordan), 168 (with John Smith, #190, 199, 260, 274 (with Alan C. Hemus, #190); #196 (with W. Corderoy); #262 (with Dave H. Taylor)
- Toxic! #7-11, 16-18 (with Alan Grant, 1991)
- Subterra (with Ricardo Barreiro and Chuck Dixon, 4Winds Publishing Group, 1989)

=== Compilations ===
- Superman/Batman: Alternate Histories, 60 pages, 1996, Titan Books, ISBN 1-85286-715-9, DC Comics, ISBN 1-56389-263-4)
- Sinestro Corps War: Tales of the Sinestro Corps, ISBN 1-4012-1801-6)
- Moving Fortress (with Chuck Dixon & Ricardo Barreiro, 54 page prestige format one-shot, 4Winds, November 1988)
- Judge Dredd Megazine (vol. 3) #36-38, collected in tpb, 80 pages, Titan, 1998, ISBN 1-84023-021-5, Dark Horse Comics, 1999, ISBN 1-56971-345-6)
- Starblazer Volume 1, includes Starblazer #45, D.C. Thomson & Co. Ltd, 2019, (ISBN 978-1-84535-799-3)
- Starblazer Volume 2, includes Starblazer #127, D.C. Thomson & Co. Ltd, 2024, (ISBN 978-1-84535-969-0)
