= Eugenio Juan Zappietro =

Argentine comic book writer

- Born: Eugenio Juan Zappietro; February 29, 1936 (age 90) Buenos Aires, Argentina
- Areas: Cartoonist, Writer
- Collaborators: Juan Zanotto

Eugenio Juan Zappietro, better known by his pseudonym Ray Collins (born February 29, 1936), is an Argentine retired comic book writer. Among his best-known works are Precinto 56 and Yor the Hunter (Henga el cazador).

== Biography ==
Zappietro was born in Buenos Aires, Argentina on February 29, 1936. He began his writing career at the age of 23, encouraged by Julio Anibal Portas of Abril publishing, who suggested that he should use an American pseudonym.

Hugo Pratt commissioned him his first comic, Precinto 56, which had a police theme and was drawn by Jose Muñoz.

In 1967, he was a finalist for Spain's Planeta Award with his novel Time to Die. In 1974, he created the now-classic comic Yor the Hunter along with the artist Juan Zanotto. The comic was also published in the Italian magazine Lanciostory beginning with its first issue (#0) in 1975. The 1983 Italian-French science fiction film Yor, the Hunter from the Future was based on the comic.

He also created the series The Vikings with Arturo del Castillo for the magazine "Tit-Bits" in 1975. Beginning in 1979, he continued the comic Dennis Martin, with drawings by Lito Fernandez.

== Personal life ==
Besides been a comics writer, Zappietro also worked as a police officer and as the director of the police museum in his hometown city of San Martin.
