= Yor, the Hunter from the Future =

1983 film directed by Antonio Margheriti

- Theatrical release poster
- Italian: Il mondo di Yor
- Directed by: Antonio Margheriti
- Screenplay by: Antonio Margheriti; Robert Bailey
- Based on: Yor the Hunter by Ray Collins; Juan Zanotto
- Produced by: Michele Marsala
- Starring: Reb Brown; Corinne Cléry; John Steiner; Carole André
- Cinematography: Marcello Masciocchi
- Edited by: Alberto Moriani; Giorgio Serrallonga
- Music by: John Scott; Guido & Maurizio De Angelis
- Production companies: Diamant Film; RAI
- Distributed by: Adige Film 76 (Italy); P.M Productions (France)
- Release dates: 10 February 1983 (Italy); 24 August 1983 (France)
- Running time: 88 minutes
- Countries: Italy; France; Turkey
- Language: Italian
- Box office: $2.8 million

Yor, the Hunter from the Future (Italian: Il mondo di Yor, lit. 'The World of Yor') is a 1983 science fiction fantasy film directed by Antonio Margheriti and starring Reb Brown, Corinne Cléry, John Steiner, and Carole André. A co-production between Italy, France, and Turkey, the film is based on the Argentinian comic Yor the Hunter, created by writer Ray Collins and artist Juan Zanotto.

Though one of Margheriti's most financially successful films, it received mostly poor reviews at the time of release (especially from Variety and The New York Times) and drew three nominations at the 4th Golden Raspberry Awards in 1984.

== Plot ==
Yor, a roving hunter and barbarian, jogs through a seemingly prehistoric desert landscape past the stone towers of Cappadocia, Turkey. Kalaa, a seemingly primitive cavewoman, and her mentor and protector Pag are hunting in a nearby village. They were hunting a small pig-like Polacanthus. Suddenly, they are attacked by a "stegoceratops" (a cross-breed of a Stegosaurus and a Triceratops). Yor appears and kills the dinosaur with his axe, drinking some of its blood immediately afterward. The village befriends Yor, and together, the villagers cut the choice meats to be feasted upon in celebration.

While Yor rests, a band of cavemen with bluish skin attack the village. Only Yor and Pag escape. Yor immediately swears to get Kalaa back. Yor and Pag track the blue cavemen to their lair, where Yor shoots a giant bat with his bow and arrow. He uses the dead bat like a hang glider to storm the lair and starts flooding sections of the cave, the diversion helping his escape out the back with Kalaa. The flood kills everyone inside the cave, including the other kidnapped villagers (who had been locked in cages) as well as the blue cavemen.

Kalaa and Pag decide to follow Yor in his adventure to find his origins. Along the way, they find a mysterious society of sand mummies led by a blonde woman named Roa with an amulet similar to Yor's own. Yor proceeds to kill everyone except Roa, deciding that she will be important for their journey. Kalaa tries to kill Roa at one point, but they are both suddenly attacked by more blue cavemen. Yor and Pag come to the rescue, but a caveman strikes Roa down from behind, and she dies in Yor's arms.

Yor, Pag, and Kalaa make friends with another tribe after saving some children from a dimetrodon, but this tribe is killed by (unseen) flying saucers shooting lasers. Yor and company use a boat to make their way to an island surrounded by storms. There Yor discovers, to his initial disbelief, that his parents were from a small band of nuclear holocaust survivors, thereby revealing that Yor's world is actually post-apocalyptic Earth after a nuclear holocaust. A ruthless tyrant called the Overlord has taken control of the remaining nuclear technology with his android army. He intends to use Yor and Kalaa, who he reveals is a 'genetically perfect' woman, to create a new master race based on his androids in order to rule the entire planet.

Yor finds allies in a group of rebels led by the scientist, Ena, and the mysterious blind Elder, who have been plotting to overthrow the Overlord for years. After being rescued by Ena, Yor and the rebels join forces to attack the Overlord and his androids. Ena leads them to the fortress's atomic stockpile, where they plant explosives powerful enough to destroy it and the fortress. The Elder remains behind and slowly deactivates the android army, buying time for the others to escape. The Overlord pursues them in an attempt to stop the stockpile's destruction and briefly engages Yor in combat, overwhelming him temporarily. As the Overlord enters an elevator, Yor grabs a nearby pole and hurls it through the window, impaling the villain. Mortally wounded, the Overlord struggles onward toward the stockpile as Yor and Ena continue to lead the others to safety. Pag orders them to keep going while he fends off the androids, but he loses his weapon and gets cornered by them. Ena and the rebels rush to his aid, but just as the androids are about to kill Pag, the Elder deactivates them.

The group quickly boards one of the Overlord's ships just as the Overlord himself reaches the stockpile control room. But before he can stop the bomb, it explodes, and he succumbs to his injuries and slowly dies. At the same moment, the Overlord's spacecraft, carrying Yor, Kalaa, Pag, Ena and the rebels flies out of the hangar to safety while the Overlord's facility explodes behind them. As the movie ends and the ship flies off into the distance, the narrator intones: "...Yor returns to the primitive tribes on the mainland. He is determined to use his superior knowledge to prevent them making the same mistakes as their forefathers. Will he succeed?"

== Cast ==
- Reb Brown as Yor
- Corinne Cléry as Kalaa
- Luciano Pigozzi as Pag (credited as Alan Collins)
- Carole André as Ena
- John Steiner as Overlord
- Ayşegül Ünsal as Roa of the Sand-People (credited as Ayshe Gul)
- Aytekin Akkaya as Ukan, leader of the Sand-People
- Luigina Rocchi as Tarita
- Sergio Nicolai as Kay

== Production ==
Yor, the Hunter from the Future is an adaptation of the Argentinian comic book Yor the Hunter (original title: Henga el cazador), created in 1974 by writer Ray Collins and artist Juan Zanotto. The comic appeared in the Italian magazine Lanciostory in 1975. Director Antonio Margheriti later told an interviewer that the comic was fascinating to him.

The film was part of a wave of sword-and-sorcery themed films that appeared after the success of John Milius's 1982 film version of Conan the Barbarian. Other Italian productions that appeared in 1983 in its wake along with Yor, including Lucio Fulci's Conquest and Franco Prosperi's The Throne of Fire (both 1983). The film differs from the comics where the second part of the film begins to resemble Star Wars.

Yor, the Hunter from the Future was shot primarily on-location in Turkey, including scenes shot in Cappadocia. Along with co-writing and directing the film, Margheriti supervised the films special effects with his son Edoardo.

The film was originally made as a four part miniseries which was broadcast on Italy's RAI television.

Reb Brown's voice was dubbed by Gregory Snegoff in the English-language version.

== Release ==
Yor, the Hunter from the Future was released in Italy on 10 February 1983. Running time of the Italian feature version of the film was 98 minutes, while the version released on 19 August 1983 in American theaters ran 89 minutes. The film was distributed in the United States by Columbia Pictures. Margheriti stated that Columbia distributed 1400 prints of the film and that it was "one of the most successful pictures of my life." Yor, the Hunter from the Future grossed a total of $2,810,199 in the United States.

=== Home media ===
The film was released on DVD as part of Sony's on-demand manufacturing service on 6 September 2011. A Blu-ray of the film was released by Mill Creek Entertainment in January 2018 with an audio commentary with actor Reb Brown. The Blu-ray features the American theatrical cut, not the longer Italian version.

== Reception ==
It's so bad! [...] Every once in a while, I enjoy looking for Yor in those movie guides and I always discover a "bomb" or a "turkey" rating.

— Antonio Margheriti on Yor, the Hunter from the Future

In contemporary reviews, Variety referred to the film as "one of the cheesiest pics to bear a major studio imprimatur recently, and will have to grab the under-12 crowd on opening weekend or two to pay off. Nobody older than that will buy it." Janet Maslin of The New York Times admitted to not having finished watching the film for her review, noting that she could not imagine who would want to finish the film. The Washington Post opined, "Even gluttons for dumbness may find it easy to refrain from second helpings". The Globe and Mail described it as "even worse than you think" and suggested that it was a rip-off of Star Wars and Quest for Fire.

In Leonard Maltin's Movie and Video Guide, a review commented that the film was "Humorously tacky at first, then just plain boring." John Nubbin reviewed Yor, the Hunter from the Future for Different Worlds magazine and stated that "Not having a lot of room, I will not waste what I have listing Yor's faults, or placing blame. There is no point. Every single thing about Yor was bad. Cheaply put together with little-to-no forethought, it rambles on from beginning to end, never bothering with anything so trite as a plot or understandable action."

The film was nominated for three Golden Raspberry Awards at the 4th Golden Raspberry Awards in 1984, for Worst New Star (Reb Brown), Worst Musical Score and Worst Original Song ("Yor's World"). The film's director Margheriti commented on the film years after its release that the extended television version of the film was "even more hilarious" and that the film was "a fun project made with almost zero budget. It was a party film and I sometimes enjoy looking at it again." On the review aggregator website Rotten Tomatoes, 14% of 7 critics' reviews are positive.

== See also ==
- List of Italian films of 1983
- List of films based on comics
