= Ernesto García Seijas =

Argentine comics artist (1941–2023)

Ernesto Rudesindo García Seijas (1 June 1941 – 28 March 2023) was an Argentine comics artist.

== Biography ==
García Seijas was born in Ramos Mejía, and at age 17 he made his debut in comics by providing art for the series Bill y Boss, published in the Argentine magazine Totem. Also in 1958 he started working for the magazine Bucaneros in the eponymous series, as well as for other publishers as artist and cover illustrator.

In the 1960s and 1970s he worked with Hector G. Oesterheld at the magazines Frontera, Hora Cero, Misterix and Rajo Rojo: titles he worked on include Tom de la Pradera and Leon Loco. García Seijas later collaborated substantially for Columba, a publisher specializing in romantic comics books for women and in film adaptations; these include Helena, created by Robin Wood, which was turned into a TV series in the 1980s.

García Seijas also worked for Columba's main rival, Record, with adventure/mystery/western works such as Skorpio and Many Riley (written by Ray Collins), El Hombre de Richmond ("The Man of Richmond", script by Andrea Mantelli), La estirpe de Josh (written by Alfredo Grassi) and Los aventureros (script by Carlos Albiac). For Columba he drew Kevin, also written by Robin Wood.

García Seijas produced comics strips for the newspapers El Clarín (El Negro Blanco, an erotic comic strip written by Carlos Trillo, 1987), La Nación (Especies en Peligro, written by Viviana Centol, 2000) and La Prensa (Bardo); El Negro Blanco later spawned the erotic-thriller series Flopi. Most of these series were translated in Italy by Eura Editoriale in its magazines Skorpio and Lanciostory. In 1990s García Seijas started to work directly for Eura Editoriale and then for Sergio Bonelli Editore, Italy's largest comics publisher. Among his series for Eura are Radzel, fantasy comics written by Eduardo Mazzitelli (1999).

García Seijas' first work for Bonelli was Julia #80, written by Giancarlo Berardi. Later he entered the staff of regular artists working for Tex Willer, starting with the story "Polizia Apache" (in the Almanacco del West 2007), followed by his first story for the ongoing series in 2008 (#571, in May). In 2011 Bonelli published his Tex large-format one-shot Le iene di Lamont (2011), with script by Claudio Nizzi.

García Seijas died on 28 March 2023, at the age of 81.
