= Henga =

Henga refers to:

- Henga el cazador, original name for Yor the Hunter
- Henga, a cultivar of Karuka
- Henga, another name for the Tumbuka people in south central Africa
