= Julien Falk =

French composer and composition teacher

Julien Falk (1902-1987) was a 20th-century French composer and composition teacher at the Conservatoire de Paris, and wrote many theorical music books.

He had many students including well known composers Serge Gainsbourg, Gabriel Yared, Michel Coeuriot, Michel Colombier, Pierre Yves Lenik, Eric Demarsan, Richard Galliano, Robbi Finkel, Philippe Blay and Alain Goraguer.

== Compositions ==
- 20 études atonales
- Bourrée for piano and violon
- Évocation for piano and clarinet
- Quatuors composed for saxophones quartet: Marcel Mule
- Quintette for 5 trompets
- Souvenir for piano and violon
- Valse tristounette for piano and violon
- Three Symphonies

Initiated in 1933 into the "Grand Orient de France", he also wrote many musical pieces for masonic ceremonies.

== Music textbooks ==
- Technique complète et progressive de l'harmonie en 3 volumes (1969)
- Technique du Contrepoint
- Technique de la Musique Atonale
- Précis technique de composition musicale
