= Blade for Barter =

Manga series

- Cover of Blade for Barter vol. 1 (2005), art by Jason DeAngelis
- Genre: Action/adventure
- Author: Jason DeAngelis
- Illustrator: Hai!
- Publisher: (United States) Seven Seas Entertainment
- Original run: 2005 – Present
- Volumes: 1

Blade for Barter is an Original English-language manga series written by Jason DeAngelis, with art by Hai! (Honoel A. Ibardolaza) and was the premiere publication of Seven Seas Entertainment.

Blade for Barter, Volume 1, was first printed in February 2005, after extensive previews on the Seven Seas Entertainment homepage. Hai!'s art is based on that of Eiichiro Oda, the creator of One Piece.

== Plot summary ==
Blade for Barter is the story of Ryusuke Washington, a private samurai for hire. He lives in New Edo, a hodgepodge city-state where New York City meets ancient Japan, where monolithic skyscrapers tower over ramshackle wooden huts, and salarymen and samurai walk side by side.

Along with his loyal dog Hachiko, Ryusuke must deal with the likes of the corrupt Samurai Union, the Mafuza (a cross between the Italian mafia and the yakuza); a Ninja Union of clumsy ninja; a sinister Zen monk televangelist, and more - not to mention the temper-tantrum prone Lord Hoseki, who rules New Edo with bejeweled fingers and an iron fist.

The world, in which Hachiko and Ryusuke find themselves, is an eclectic mix of Eastern and Western cultures. Such blending of East and West also is found to typify, Ryusuke Washington himself, a warrior for hire.

The side effects of such a mixed culture come back to haunt Ryusuke as he has to face striking ronin who actively demonstrate, their very existence in real Japan would have violated traditional codes. He also has to face the control hungry Samurai union. Ryusuke is soon joined by the cute but over affectionate Hachiko the dog and Mac, a kunoichi who takes a certain obsessive pride in her fuzz boots. The first volume also contains omake content not seen online.
