= Carlos Meglia =

Argentinian comic book artist

- Born: December 11, 1957 Quilmes, Argentina
- Died: August 15, 2008 (aged 50)
- Areas: Comic book artist, animator
- Notable works: Cybersix; Superman/Tarzan: Sons of the Jungle; Canari

Carlos Meglia (December 11, 1957 – August 15, 2008) was an Argentine comic book artist, born in the city of Quilmes, Argentina. One of his best-known creations is the Cybersix series, done in partnership with Carlos Trillo. Meglia died on August 15, 2008, at the age of 50.

== 1974 ==
1974 is when Meglia debuted as an assistant to the illustrator Oswal Sanson, where he produced many illustrations for the magazines Pendulum and Skorpio.

== 1979 ==
Meglia illustrated the comic book adaptations of various literary classics such as Don Quichotte, La Bible pour les Enfants, and several books of Martin Fierro, the poet.

== Early 1980s ==
He contributed to several major magazines of Argentina, including Satiricon – a humorous periodical, El Grafico – a sports magazine, and Billiken – a children's magazine.

== 1983 ==
He made his first short comic stories for the Publisher Record.

== 1984 ==
Meglia decided to enter the Hanna-Barbera Studios, where he worked in animation for some popular cartoon series, including The Smurfs, The Flintstones, and Scooby-Doo, Where Are You?, as well as the animated film The Magic Pumpkin.

== 1987 ==
- He teamed up with the famous Argentinian writer, Carlos Trillo, and together they started Irish Coffee which is a comic series about a detective with supernatural powers.
- Meglia subsequently created Big Bang and The Book of Gabriel, the story of an archangel who lost his immortality and must endure a quest to gain forgiveness from the sin he committed.
- He also did the cover art for Acme Editorial (on which it is signed with the pseudonym Mercuria Karur) and was a teacher of illustration at the School of Fine Arts in Quilmes, where he was born.

== 1991 ==
Trillo and Meglia created their most famous character, Cybersix.

== 1993 ==
- Meglia was awarded Best European Comic Character.
- Meglia and Trillo start the two miniseries Lam and Livevil.

== 1995 ==
Cybersix becomes a live-action television series in Argentina however, its low ratings led it to only lasting seven episodes.

== 1999 ==
- Cybersix becomes an animated television series. It debuted in Canada and Argentina on September 6, and was subsequently dubbed for French, Japanese, Malaysian, Polish, South American, and Thai viewers.
- Meglia begins overseeing the production of a film based on Livelil.

== Second half of the 1990s ==
After settling down in Spain, Meglia began working for the US market. He cooperated on series such as Wildcats, Dark Horse titles like Star Wars and Spyboy, as well as DC's Superman/Tarzan: Sons of the Jungle, Crimson, Adventures of Superman, and Monster World, as well as Marvel's Elektra.

== 2001 ==
Cybersix animated series wins "Special Mention for the Best Science Fiction Program" at the Pulcinella Awards in Italy.

== 2005 ==
- He created the series Canari with Belgian comic artist Didier Crisse.
- Carlos Meglia died of a heart attack on August 15, 2008, at age 50.

== Bibliography ==
- Star Wars: Underworld
- Superman/Tarzan: Sons of the Jungle (2001)
- Adventures of Superman #603-605 (2002)
- Action Comics #799 (2003)
- Superman: Infinite City (2005)
