= Pierre Yves Lenik =

French composer (born 1958)

Pierre Yves Lenik (born 27 July 1958) is a French composer, known for his work in French documentaries.

His work included the scores for TV series: "Régis l'éventreur" by Georges Combe and TV documentaries "Le juste NON" documentary by Caroline Buffard (2000), "La vie en question" documentary by Caroline Puig-Grenetier (2009), "Entre désir et incertitude" documentary by Abdelkader Lagtaâ (2010).

He is also working on English language films: "Prediction" a short film directed by John Jennissen (2010) and French language films with English subtitles: "Contumace" a short film directed by Nelson Rodrigo (2020).

He won three Best musical awards: (Virgin Spring Cinefest) Best original score for "Contumace" in absentia by Nelson Rodrigo (2021) (Le Creusot film festival); for his work on "La formation en quatre actes" by Olivier Xueref (1992) and "L'esprit et la matiere" by Arielle Mémery (2000).

== Biography ==
Pierre Yves Lenik obtained a degree in history at Lumière University Lyon 2. In 1981, he attended the SERAV film course directed by Ange Casta (French director). He previously attended the Lyon Conservatory of Music teacher's course Charles Montaland and learned the rules of harmony, but his formal musical education really began when he met Gabriel Yared in 1984, and learned the rules of music composition and counterpoint from Julien Falk.

== Advertising ==
Since 1984, he had collaborations with folk music and classical musicians, and also contributed to many radio and TV jingles, such as ANPE (from 2004 to 2009) and Société Générale (since 2005) jingles.

== Selected filmography ==
- "Le Brionnais au cœur du Roman" France Télévisions Documentary by Didier Revollat-Veuillet and Damien Marquet (2025) original score - read Allocine
- "Votre vie m'importe - L'Ehpad du bonheur" France Télévisions Documentary by Caroline Puig-Grenetier (2025) original score - read ICI Auvergne Rhône-Alpes
- "Les couleurs de la Foi" KTO Documentary by Carine Loubeau (2025) original score - see Director's interview by Carine Loubeau
- "Miracles, signe de l'amour divin" KTO Documentary by Fabien Collini (2024) original score
- "Le Courage de la foi" KTO Documentary by Jean-Claude Duret (2024) original score
- "Suspendus sur nos rêves" France Télévisions Documentary by Caroline Puig-Grenetier (2023) original score - read review by Pascale Menard
- Le serment des 103, tous unis pour le Larzac HISTOIRE Tv Documentary by Véronique Garcia (2022) original score
- Les Passeurs de l’Erdre France Télévisions Documentary by Christian Nadin (2021) original score
- "Le Nerf de la Guerre" - 2 x 52' (2020) Documentary by Veronique Garcia original score
- "Contumace" (In Absentia) - Short film by Nelson Rodrigo(2020) original score (OCS)CONTUMACE (In Absentia) VF ST English
- "Les Heures vert-de-gris" (2019) Documentary by Veronique Garciaoriginal score
- "14-18 coup de canon sur le cinema francais" (2018) Documentary by Veronique Garcia original score (selected by "Pessac Historical films festival" - France, 2020 )
- "Prediction" (short) - Short film by John Jennissen (2010) original score (UK)
- "Entre désir et incertitude" Documentary by Abdelkader Lagtaâ (2010) original score
- "La vie en question (Bioethics)" Documentary by Caroline Puig-Grenetier (2009) original score

== Awards ==
- Best music score : "Contumace - in absentia" (2021) by Nelson Rodrigo at "Virgin Spring Cinefest"
- Best music score : "La formation en quatre actes" (1992) by Olivier Xueref at "Le Creusot film festival"
- Best music score : "L'esprit et la matiere" (2000) by Arielle Memery at "Le Creusot film festival"
