= Robbi Finkel =

American composer (born 1950)

- Born: Robert Mark Finkel; April 11, 1950 (age 76)
- Origin: Philadelphia, Pennsylvania, U.S.
- Occupations: Composer; arranger; pianist; record producer
- Years active: 1969–present

Robbi Finkel (born Robert Mark Finkel; April 11, 1950 in Philadelphia, Pennsylvania) is an American-Canadian composer, record producer, pianist and arranger. Grammy nominated, Finkel is an honorary lifetime voting member of the National Academy of Recording Arts and Sciences (Grammy Awards).

He is best known for his work on numerous record arrangements and productions in France (Jacques Dutronc ‘Cest pas du Bronze’, Jacques Higelin ‘Champagne pour tout le monde, Caviar pour les autres’, Alan Stivell Tir Na Nog/Symphonie Celte) and in Canada (Cirque du Soleil Alegría, Zumanity, Les Colocs Les Colocs, Suite 2016, and Moist Mercedes Five and Dime).

He is also known for his musical composition of the Cybersix animated cartoon series (Tokyo Mitaka Studios, Network of Animation), as well as the music of several multimedia games (Mattel Slotcars, Ubisoft Entertainment Hype: The Time Quest), theatrical (DHC Productions Atreus, Compagnie Pol Pelletier Joie, Océan) and film productions (Les Charlots Charlots’ Connection, Retour des Bidasses en Folie).

== Early life ==
Finkel started playing piano when he was four years old. In the Philadelphia area he began piano lessons at five with Heinrich Ziegler, later theory with Elizabeth Binder and piano with May Harrow. He also studied viola at eight, later guitar and at fourteen played tympani in the Philadelphia Youth Orchestra and performed at the Academy of Music as member of the Cheltenham High School Choir. He later studied piano at the Conservatoire de Lausanne. When Finkel lived in Paris he was invited by colleague arranger and flautist Chris Hayward to attend master classes in composition with Nadia Boulanger at the École Normale Supérieure de la Musique. He was later introduced to Julien Falk by colleague arranger Gabriel Yared, and studied composition privately with Julien Falk for four years.
