= El Negro Blanco =

Argentine comic strip

Publication information
- Publisher: Clarín
- Schedule: daily
- Format: comic strip
- Genre: Erotic, Comedy
- Publication date: 1987-1994

Creative team
- Written by: Carlos Trillo
- Penciller: Ernesto García Seijas

El Negro Blanco is an Argentine comic strip that was published by the Clarín newspaper from 1987 to 1994. It was written by Carlos Trillo, and drawn by Ernesto García Seijas. The words "negro" and "blanco" mean black and white in Spanish, but Blanco is the family name of the main character and "Negro" is a common Argentinian nickname.

== Premise ==
Same as with the former comic strip El Loco Chávez that this one replaced, the main character is a fictional journalist, who works in a fictional depiction of the Clarín newspaper that published it. Most story arcs were about both some weird news report assigned to him, or trivial ones that develop an unexpected twist, and a romantic affair. The Negro Blanco develops relations with many different women, but Chispa Valdéz and Flopi Bach are recurring ones.

== Publication ==
Cover for an Argentinian Playboy magazine featuring Flopi Bach (left) and Araceli González (right).

El Negro Blanco was published by the Clarín newspaper from 1987 to 1994. It replaced El Loco Chávez at the page devoted to comic strips, being replaced at its end by El Nene Montanaro. The newspaper added extra stories at the Sunday magazine on some occasions. Ivrea republished the whole run of the comic strip in 10 comic books in prestige format in 2006, and El Globo Editor published a specific story arc in 1993.

The character Carlos Marcucci is freely based on a real man with that name, friend of the writer Carlos Trillo. According to Marcucci, Ernesto García Seijas accurately portrayed him as an ugly man, who is nevertheless successful with women (however, the comic strip took that to parodic levels).

To design the character of Flopi Bach, Seijas modeled her after Araceli González, then an unknown model hired for that work. The character was very successful, and both González and the character appeared at a 1991 issue of the Argentine edition of the Playboy magazine. It was the first time that Playboy published erotic images of a fictional character instead of photos of real people. Seijas took the character for spin-off series, after the end of the comic strip.

Trillo and Seijas worked as well in the "Sangre de brujas" (Spanish: Blood of witches) comic book, another spin-off with the character Agatha.

== Characters ==
- Roberto "Negro" Blanco: It's the main character of the comic strip. He is a journalist of the Clarín newspaper, a metafictional reference to the real newspaper that published the comic strip.
- Chispa Valdéz: She's the main girlfriend of the Negro. They met again after several years without contact in the beginning of the comic strip. She is an architect, and finally gets married with someone else.
- Flopi Bach: She is the second girlfriend of the Negro, introduced some time afterwards. Negro would move from one to the other, in the different story arcs. She began as a novice reporter for the newspaper, but was hired later by a sensationalist news program. Negro left her, and she swore vengeance against him.
- Carlos Marcucci: A friend of the Negro Blanco, troubled because all women try to seduce him.
- Aníbal: The Negro's boss at Clarín newspaper.
- Susana: Susana is a fellow reporter of the newspaper. She likes the Negro Blanco, but he never got interested in her.
- Agatha: Agatha is a witch that influences the other's lives. She appeared in the first story arcs.
- Miguel: Miguel is yet another friend of Negro.
- Melisa Caramelo: A psychiatrist, romantically interested in Aníbal.
- Roberto Blanco sr.: The Negro's father.
- Badaracco: Flopi's boss at the news program.
- Cococha Valdivia: Cococha Valdivia is a character from the TV channel, interested in gossip, both of close and famous people. The graphic design is similar to that of Olive Oyl, and the name is also similar (Olive Oyl has been translated to Spanish audiences as "Olivia").
- The TV channel director: The TV channel is directed by a megalomaniac man, without a defined name across the stories. Other characters usually talk about him using grandiloquent names such as "the King of Kings", "Raging Zeus", "The Great Manitu", etc.
