= Domingo Roberto Mandrafina =

Argentine comics artist

- Born: Domingo Roberto Mandrafina; November 2, 1945 (age 81) Buenos Aires, Argentina
- Area: Comics artist
- Pseudonym: Cacho
- Notable works: Lady Shadow; Ulises Boedo; El Piñon Fijo; Spaghetti Brothers

Domingo Roberto Mandrafina (born November 2, 1945), also called Cacho Mandrafina, is an Argentine comics artist.

== Biography ==
He debuted in 1969 on the magazine Patoruzito. Two years later he illustrated the science fiction series Samos, written by Jorge Morhain for the magazine Billiken. In 1972 Mandrafina started his collaboration with Editorial Columba and the review Top. In 1978 he started illustrating the series Savarese, written by Robin Wood, published in the magazine D'artagnan.

Later he worked for Ediciones Record (Lady Shadow and El condenado). His other works include Dragger (written by Carlos Trillo), Cosecha verde and Race of Scorpions, for the American publisher Dark Horse Comics.
