= Ricardo Barreiro =

Argentina comics book writer

- Born: October 2, 1949 Palermo, Buenos Aires
- Died: March 12, 1999 (aged 49) Buenos Aires
- Area: Writer

Ricardo Barreiro (October 2, 1949 – April 12, 1999) was an Argentine comic book writer. Barreiro's oeuvre has been acclaimed in his country, Latin America and Europe, and many of his titles appeared in the Spanish, Italian and Dutch languages. Conversely, only a few of his works have been released in English.

== Biography ==
Barreiro was born in the barrio of Palermo in Buenos Aires. At a very early age he published articles and short stories on the underground magazine Sancho. His first comic book as writer was SlotBar, with art by Francisco Solano Lopez. This was followed by the noteworthy war series of As de Pique ("Pik As") and the science-fiction The City, both drawn by Juan Giménez.

In the 1970s he moved to Europe, living in Paris and Rome for six years; he became particularly popular in France.

Barreiro returned to Argentina, where he died of larynx cancer at age 49.

== Bibliography ==
Bárbara, drawing by Juan Zanotto.

Comics work includes:

- Cain, with Risso, Ediciones de la Urraca
- Ciudad, with Juan Giménez) Hora Cero
- El Instituto, with Francisco Solano López)
- El Instituto II, with Francisco Solano López) Doedytores
- Factor Límite , with Juan Giménez, Colección Vilan
- Moving Fortress, with Enrique Alcatena, Skorpio
- PARQUE CHAS I and II, with Risso
- Slot Barr, with Francisco Solano López, Editorial Colihue
- Bárbara, with Juan Zanotto
- Virus, with Ariel Olivetti, Mauro Cascioli, Julian Aznar, Marcelo Sosa and Juan Bobillo, Comic Press
- As de Pique, with Juan Gimenez
- El Mago, with Enrique Alcatena
- El Eternauta: Odio Cósmico Nº1
- El Eternauta: Odio Cósmico Nº2
- Buenos Aires, las putas y el loco, with Oswal
- Le Pecheur de Brooklyn, with Massimo Rotundo
