= Batman: Leatherwing =

Batman comic published in 1994

"Leatherwing"
- Cover to Detective Comics Annual #7
- Publisher: Elseworlds (DC Comics)
- Publication date: 1994
- Genre: Superhero
- Title(s): Detective Comics Annual #7
- Main character: Batman

Creative team
- Writer: Chuck Dixon
- Artist: Enrique Alcatena
- Letterer(s): Comicraft; Richard Starkings
- Colorist: David Hornun
- Editor(s): Scott Peterson; Darren Vincenzo
- Superman/Batman: Alternate Histories: ISBN 1-56389-263-4

Leatherwing, also known as Batman: Leatherwing, is a DC Comics Elseworlds story published in Detective Comics Annual #7 in 1994. It was written by Chuck Dixon and illustrated by Enrique Alcatena, who also devised the plot.

This story features a version of Batman as a pirate of the High Seas, during the Golden Age of Piracy. A sequel to the story was published in The Batman Chronicles #11 (winter 1998).

== Characters ==
Familiar characters from the Batman mythos are adapted to fit this tale of pirates:

- Captain Leatherwing (Batman): Captain of the Flying Fox, he is employed by King James II of England to pillage rival countries' ships, though he keeps a share for himself and his men. He wears a costume to protect his family name, since England would be appalled at one of her children sailing about the seas like he does. He raids ship and collects gold in the hope that he will one day have enough to buy back the land of his parents, which were stolen from him when they were murdered.
- Princess Quext'chala is the daughter of King Hapa of the Caiman indios. Batman rescues this princess from Panama from Spaniards. In gratitude, she wishes to marry him.
- Alfredo (Alfred Pennyworth): Captain Leatherwing's faithful servant and navigator, he is Italian and always vigilant. He is in a state of constant disagreement with Captain Leatherwing regarding his trusting in others, namely Robin Redblade and Capitana Felina, but means well.
- Robin Redblade (Robin): 'Prince of the Urchins and bloody terror of the Kingston docks', this orphan, who lives in Kingston, Jamaica, robs citizens of the town to feed himself and other homeless children ('urchins'). He dreams of becoming a pirate like Captain Leatherwing.
- The Laughing Man (the Joker): Deformed and insane, his ship is called the 'Pescador'.
- Capitana Felina (Catwoman): Once a Contessa of Spain, she abandoned her life on the shore for adventure on the high seas. Her ship is called The Cat's Paw. Oddly, Contessa is an Italian title, the Spanish title being Condesa.

== Plot ==
The story begins with Leatherwing's crew pillaging a Spanish galleon, where Leatherwing convinces the captain to surrender Princess Quext'chala, who was held captive while the ship was sailing for Spain. While Leatherwing gives his share of the loot to the crown of England, he hides the rest in Vespertilio (Bat's) Cay, his secret port. The location of this port is desired by many of Leatherwing's enemies, including the Laughing Man, who squeezes out the port's location out of a man called Don Vendugo by strapping a cannon to his chest. While it is stationed at Kingston, Robin sneaks onto the Flying Fox and hides while Leatherwing sails to Panama to return the princess to her father. To the Captain's surprise, he accidentally accepts a bracelet from her, and they are considered married according to her traditions.

Capitana Felina is having an argument with some of her crew, disputing some of their share of the booty when suddenly the Laughing Man intervenes, kills the rebellious crewmembers and offers to Felina an alliance: she is to seduce and distract Captain Leatherwing and the Laughing Man will follow his ship to the secret port, where they will pillage it and become rich beyond their wildest dreams.

While hiding inside the ship, Robin overhears talk of mutiny among the crew. He informs Captain Leatherwing, who gladly engages him as a buccaneer despite the fact that Robin is a clandestine passenger. Alfredo disapproves of the whole idea, and Leatherwing tells him that they will keep Robin until they again hit Kingston. While sailing, the Flying Fox sees a Spanish galleon. It contains Felina, dressed as a Spanish Condesa by the Laughing Man. Seeing a woman in distress, Leatherwing leaps to save Felina, who has been thrown overboard and is about to be eaten by sharks. The Laughing Man's disguised ship gets away, and the trap begins.

Despite Alfredo's words of warning, Captain Leatherwing allows Felina to watch him sail the ship at night. While Captain Leatherwing shows Felina how to steer, they kiss and then sleep together. When again left on her own, Felina decides to double-cross the Laughing Man. She tells herself that if she becomes Leatherwing's bride, she will be the Queen of the Pirates, and she will not have to share any of her treasures with the Laughing Man. Leatherwing's excitement over the thought of proposing to Felina makes him forget about the princess and Felina sees her embracing Leatherwing. Felina is filled with rage and escapes from the Flying Fox determined to destroy Leatherwing. Robin follows her and is captured while Capitana Felina and the Laughing Man prepare their assault.

Robin denounces Felina for betraying a man that loves her. He then reveals to her that the princess means nothing to the Captain. Felina realizes her mistake and alerts Leatherwing with a cannon shot. As the two ships battle, Leatherwing and the Laughing Man fight. Leatherwing gains the upper hand, but the Laughing Man has a trick up his sleeve; his sword dissimulates a pistol, which he fires into Robin, who jumps in front of Leatherwing. Fueled by rage, Leatherwing kills his adversary by impaling him to his ship's mast with his cutlass and defeats the opposing ship. He then orders the ship to be plundered and scuttled, and gives the Laughing Man's crewmen the choice of whether to join him or sink with the ship. Thanks to Leatherwing's skill at surgery, Robin makes a full recovery, and Felina and Leatherwing become a couple, pillaging and robbing ships all over the seven seas. The final image seen is of the Laughing Man's corpse under the sea, still impaled to his ship's mast.

== Connections ==
This alternate version of Batman differs from the original in a number of ways and contains references to various works of fiction:

- Though most incarnations of Batman refuse to kill, this one only wants to spill the least amount of blood possible.
- In this story, Batman is British, and Alfred is Italian. In regular continuity, Batman is American and Alfred is British.
- Traditionally, Batman refuses to use guns because his parents were murdered with a firearm. In this tale, Leatherwing's parents were murdered at sword-point, but he has no problem with using a sword.
- Batman's ship, the Flying Fox is a reference to Zorro, who, in regular continuity, was a major influence in Bruce Wayne's choice to become a superhero. Zorro's name means 'fox' in Spanish and a flying fox is a kind of bat. Also in regular continuity, there is a Golden Age hero called the Flying Fox who essentially replaced the Golden Age Batman.
- A sequel, also written by Chuck Dixon, was published in The Batman Chronicles #11 (winter 1998) and called "The Bride of Leatherwing". The story is done in prose with illustrations, and features Capitana Felina as the main character and a new enemy, Admiral Cobblepot (the Penguin).
- According to the Absolute Crisis on Infinite Earths hardcover book, the alternate Earth that this story takes place in was originally known as Earth-494.
- Final Crisis Secret Files and Origins #1 and The Multiversity: Mastermen #1 featured Leatherwing on the Nazi-dominated Earth-10 as a member of the New Reichsmen.

== Collected editions ==
The story has been collected in a trade paperback along with three other Elseworlds stories:

- Superman/Batman: Alternate Histories (60 pages, 1996, Titan Books, ISBN 1-85286-715-9, DC Comics, ISBN 1-56389-263-4)

== Other media ==
- Captain Leatherwing appears in the Batman: The Brave and the Bold episode "Game Over for Owlman!" when Batman recruits several different versions of himself from the multiverse to help him defeat Owlman and a large alliance of supervillains.
- In Lego DC Comics Super Heroes: Justice League – Cosmic Clash, Batman uses a pirate outfit similar to Leatherwing.

== See also ==
- List of Elseworlds publications
- Pirates in the arts and popular culture
