= Charles Montaland =

Charles Montaland (14 February 1910 – 10 February 1985) was a French organist, composer, improviser, and music teacher, born in Lyon.

He studied music composition with René Leibowitz and orchestration with Manuel Rosenthal.

For 30 years he taught music at Lyon music conservatory (fr).

He taught music to the French film music composer Pierre Yves Lenik.

A street in the neighbourhood of Villeurbanne bears his name.

A choir bears his name. Ensemble Charles Montaland
