= Raruto =

Spanish webcomic

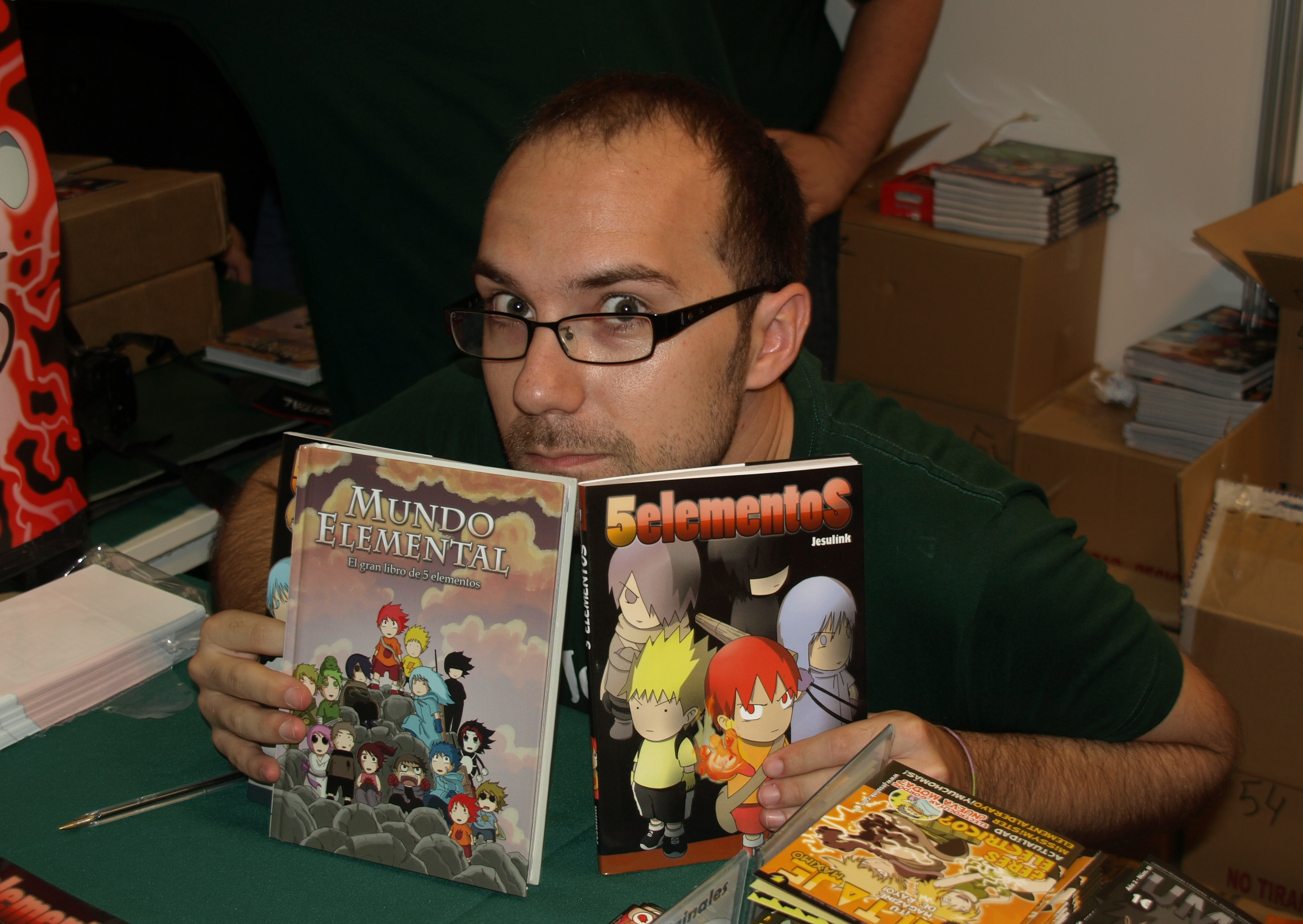
Jesús García Ferrer (Jesulink) in the 2011 Salón del Manga de Barcelona

Raruto is a Spanish webcomic by Jesús García Ferrer (Jesulink); Raruto parodies the Japanese anime and manga series Naruto.

The series has been available in "Salón del Manga" events in Spain. As of 2008 about 40,000 people in Spain read his webcomic. Because of Raruto and other Spanish manga-inspired works, García became famous on the internet.

Raruto has translations in Catalan, Chinese, English, French, Italian, and Portuguese. Rik translated the first six chapters in English, while Leecherboy translated the subsequent chapters in English. Jesulink received an award for being the best Spanish artist at an ExpoManga event. Raruto began on 30 October 2005 and concluded on 6 June 2008.

== Creation and conception ==
Originally Raruto was a hobby of Jesulink, but as time passed he felt that the series became a "responsibility" for him, and he became careful with how he portrayed the characters so his readers would be satisfied. Raruto was created to satirize anime and manga properties that already existed.

== Characters ==
- Zumomaki Raruto - A parody of Naruto Uzumaki, Raruto is a boy from Torroja village who possesses a demon fox inside of him. Jesulink named the character "Raruto" because The Legend of Zelda: The Wind Waker has a character, Laruto, named in the Japanese version "Sage Raruto." Jesulink chose the name "Raruto" because The Legend of Zelda series video games are his favourite video games. In addition in Spanish "raro" means "weird," so his name could be translated as "Weirdto." The family name "Zumomaki" is also a pun. In Spanish "zumo" means "juice." The translator says "but it makes no sense..."
- Kuchilla Saske - A parody of Sasuke Uchiha, Saske says that he hates "everything, white rice above all." The name "Saske" originates from "Sasuke" of the original character, and is pronounced the same as the name of the original character. In Spanish "cuchilla" means "Knife."
- Margarina Flora - A parody of Sakura Haruno. In Spanish "Flora" refers to plants, and a "Flor" refers to a flower. The character's name refers to the original character's name, "Sakura," meaning "cherry blossom." In Spanish "Margarina" means "margarine," and a brand of margarine in Spain is "Margarina Flora."
- Kagate Kakasi (Kágate Kakasí) - A parody of Kakashi Hatake. In Spanish "caca" refers to feces and "sí" means yes, so his name means "yes, poopoo". In Spanish "cagate" means to defecate.

== Places ==
- Torroja - A parody of Konoha Village. "Torroja" is an abbreviation for "toda" and "roja," so the village name means "all red." The translator says "it doesn't makes any sense, I know... it just sounds funny." [sic] In Spanish "ja" is pronounced like the "ha" in Konoha. In addition, there is an actual Spanish town called Torroja.
- The Rave Country - A parody of the Land of Waves.

== Terminology ==
- Bigbosses (Jefazo) - They are the parody of the Hokage. The name is intentionally written as "Bigbosses" in English.
- Technica Kagon, Gran Bola de Fuego - The technique is a parody of Katon, Gōkakyū no Jutsu. Because the words "kagón" and "katon" are related, the author of Raruto kept much of the name of the technique being parodied. "Cagón" means, in a literal sense, a person who defecates a lot, and in a more figurative sense, a coward. The technique produces a fiery flatulence.
- Ninja-Dex, a parody of the Pokédex from the Pokémon series.
- Sharinflan (Sharinflán), a parody of the Sharingan. The word "flan" refers to a caramel custard popular in Spain and other Spanish-speaking countries.
- Chiton Dragon no Jutsu parodies the technique of the same name in Naruto. The author said that he kept the parody's name the same as that of the original technique because of the "Chiton-Suitón thing." In Spanish "chitón" means "shut up!".
- ANBU-Lance - A parody of ANBU. The name is a pun of the English word "ambulance."
- Picha-Gordi-Chi - The term, which refers to the trio of Clara Pichamaru, Achimichi Gordi, and Yamaja Chino, is a parody of the term "Ino-Shika-Cho," referring to Ino Yamanaka, Shikamaru Nara, and Choji Akimichi. In Spanish "Picha-Gordi-Chi" can be read as "Fat-Dick-Yeah."
- Inodora-no-Jutsu - A parody of Hiru Bansho Boka no Jutsu. Inodora means toilet in Spanish.
- Sobaco Soso or Funeral Arenoso - This is a parody of "Desert Funeral" (Sabaku Sōsō). In Spanish "Funeral Arenoso" means Sand Funeral and "Sobaco Soso" means "dull armpit."
- Combo Culon - A parody of the "Lion Combo." In Spanish "Culon" refers to buttocks, so "Combo Culon" means "Assly Combo."
- Pechuga - This is a parody of Getsuga. "Pechuga" means breast meat of a poultry, such as a chicken. In Spanish someone threatening to make a pechuga of someone means threatening to do major harm to him or her.
- Yunque - A parody of Juken. In Spanish a "yunque" is an anvil.
- Soplon (Soplón) - A parody of Futon. In Spanish a "soplón" is a "blowhard."
- Pichori - A parody of Chidori. The name is a combination of "Chidori" and "Pikachu," a Pokémon. In addition it is a reference to the "minish" in the Legend of Zelda series, known as "picori" in Japanese.
- Byauntukán - A parody of the Byakugan. The name is pronounced like the phrase "Vi a un tucán", which translates to English as "I saw a toucan", because it allows the user to see other people as toucans.

== See also ==
- Dōjinshi
