= Cybersix =

1991 comics series by C. Trillo and C. Meglia

- Cybersix as she appears in TMS/NOA's 1999 animated series.

Publication information
- Publisher: Skorpio
- First appearance: Cybersix #1 (May 1991)
- Created by: Carlos Trillo and Carlos Meglia

In-story information
- Alter ego: Cyber-6
- Notable aliases: Adriana "Adrian" Seidelman
- Abilities: Martial arts expert

Cybersix is an Argentine comics character and comic book series published in 1991, created by the Argentine authors Carlos Trillo (story) and Carlos Meglia (art) for the comics magazine Skorpio (Eura Editoriale). The series first appeared in Spanish in November 1993. It follows the eponymous leather-clad genetic engineering survivor who cross-dresses (to conceal her identity) working as a male teacher during the day, and fights against the scientist who created her at night.

The series was adapted into a live-action television series and an animated television series that garnered positive critical reception from the Pulcinella Awards.

== Plot ==
Von Reichter is a surviving member of Schutzstaffel in World War II. He works on experiments in South America, creating the Cyber series of artificial humanoids with super strength and agility. The 5000 original Cybers became servants, mimicking human emotions and making their will. When they disobeyed orders, Reichter orders them all to be destroyed. After the death of Cyber-29, Reichter transfers his brain into the body of a black panther named Data-7. Cyber-6 (Cybersix) is one of the survivors, who escapes and arrives in the city of Meridiana. She disguises herself as school teacher Adrian Seidelman after the real one is killed in a car crash. Cybersix fights von Reichter's creations, the human-like Techno series, and the more Frankenstein's monster-like Fixed Ideas, in order to drink the sustenance liquid contained within them. Along the way, she meets an orphaned boy Julian, Reichter's cloned son José, and high school teacher Lucas Amato.

== Production ==
=== Comics ===
The comics were originally published in Italy in the magazine Skorpio in 113 weekly 12-pages installments from May 1991 to July 1994, followed by 45 96-pages comic books between November 1994 and January 1999. Parts of the material were translated in Spanish and published in Argentina (since 1993 by El Globo Editor) and in Spain (since 1995 by Planeta De Agostini). Collections were released in French, with twelve volumes distributed by Editions Vents d'Ouest between 1994 and 1998.

=== Live-action series ===
The series debuted in Argentina on 15 March 1995. It was produced by Luis Gandulfo, Sebastián Parrotta, Fernando Rascovsky and Andre Ronco, and written by Ricardo Rodríguez, Carlos Meglia and Carlos Trillo. The series aired on Telefé, but was cancelled after only a few episodes due to low ratings. Cybersix was played by former model and actress Carolina Peleritti, José was played by Rodrigo de la Serna, and Doguyy was played by Mario Moscoso.

== Controversy with Dark Angel and lawsuit ==
Meglia and Trillo filed a lawsuit against James Cameron, claiming that Dark Angel plagiarized the series. Trillo and Meglia accused the show of stealing most of the plot from the comic and most recognizable elements. In a 2007 interview, Trillo stated that he and Meglia dropped the lawsuit due to lack of financial resources, although the issue is still a matter of controversy.
