= Archaic (comics) =

- Cover art for Archaic: Rule of the Deviant TPB vol. 1 Art by Brett C. Marting.

Publication information
- Publisher: Fenickx Productions LLC
- Schedule: Bi-Monthly
- Format: Ongoing series
- Publication date: July 2005-

Creative team
- Created by: James S. Abrams; Brett C. Marting
- Written by: James S. Abrams (#1-Present); Brett Marting (Archaic TPB 2: Winter Children)
- Artist(s): Brett Marting (#1-9,13-15) James S. Abrams(Archaic TPB 2 - Winter Children: Slight of Hand); Weshoyot Alvitre (#10-12, Archaic TPB 2 - Winter Children: Dirt) Manuel Trujillo (Archaic TPB 2 - Winter Children: Hide and Seek)
- Colorist: Kris Johnson (Archaic TPB 2 - Winter Children: Dirt)

Archaic is an American comic book series created by writer James S. Abrams and artist Brett Marting. The series is published through Fenickx Productions LLC and saw its debut at the 2005 San Diego Comic-Con. The comic itself is an epic fantasy adventure containing many references (both in mythology and language) to Slovak lore. Many of the characters names as well as certain phrases are taken from Slavic languages as well. Since its creation Archaic has gained a rather large amount of attention in the American comics community. The series has earned several award nominations, such as Golden Chazzie nominations for Best Ongoing Series and Best Artist for 2006. Wizard Comics Magazine rated it number 4 in its 2007 top 40 indie comics.

== Publication history ==
Premiering at the 2005 San Diego Comic-Con, Archaic immediately released with 5 issues in an early small press production run that saw different covers from the later Diamond releases. Archaic began distribution through Diamond in January 2006. It originally released 6 issues in a bi-monthly format that have since been collected in 2 separate Trade paperbacks, Rule of the Deviant and Winter Children. After a several month hiatus however, the series has continued forward starting in July 2006. Now Archaic has begun a monthly release schedule from issue 7 onward.

== Synopsis ==
Archaic is an ongoing fictional story dealing with a fantasy realm and several of its both heroic and villainous inhabitants. The Antagonist, Král Groznyj rules over a vast region of land, fearing no one but those foretold in an ancient prophecy to be his own downfall. The prophecy claims that children of his own nephews would one day rise up and destroy him. From there the story covers several generations of people living in Tzenebraum, otherwise known as "The Thrice-Nine Lands".

=== Rule of the Deviant (issues #1-3) ===
The story begins with the šarkan general, Petr Drakanov besieged in his family's castle. Nestled safely behind the walls of the Drakánc Hrad, Petr sees his time coming to an end. Petr's uncle, the šarkan king Král Groznyj has sent forces to capture and kill him and his family. Well Petr holds out for sometime, eventually the betrayal of his own soldiers draws him into battle. A young and ambitious knight by the name of Valen makes a deal with Groznyj. The aid of Valens allows Groznyj to convince Sir Marcus, Petr's head knight, that Petr is a murderer. Shocked and disgusted by this false information, Sir Marcus leads an attack on Petr's castle. Petr is slain on the bridge of his fortress, his last words asking the very knight who killed him to protect his new born son. When King Groznyj eventually arrives for Petr family, Sir Marcus is the one to drag Petr's wife, Cassandra, and son, Košice, across the bridge of Drakánc Hrad. However, Sir Marcus soon realizes his mistake and is killed by Valen. Valen is able to take Cassandra to Groznyj, but Košice is spirited away by the magic of the last loyal knights under Petr's command. Meanwhile, Groznyj's armies lay waste to the cities of Faeries in a mass genocide. The Lunatai, a werewolf like species of faerie, lead the attacks on their biological cousins. During these attacks, the Lunatai are made an offer, all the northern lands in trade for hunting down two children, the descendants of the Drakanovy. The Teardrop Knights, also looking for the descendants of the Drakanovy, dispatch several groups to track down Košice and return him to safety. An older knight by the name of Velshin is the one to finally retrieve Košice, however he loses the rest of his team. Velshin then chooses to take the Drakanov child north, into hiding, until aid from the Order of Teardrop can be sent. Through all of this we also find out that Mikal Drakanov, Petr's brother, is currently imprisoned in the dungeons of Král Groznyj.

=== Winter Children (issues #4-6) ===
Years have passed since the death of Petr Drakanov and his son, Košice, now hides in the north under the watchful eye of Velshin. Velshin has told the now teenaged boy very little of his past and renamed him Kalias to hide his identity. However, with years having passed and Košice have disappeared without a trace, Groznyj fears for his future. In response Groznyj sends one of his best men, Genosik the Kinslayer, to track down and kill Košice. Genosik, along with his group of assassins, track down Košice to the village široke. At the same time, Grimm, an ex-teardrop knight under the command of Sir Marcus, leads a group of mercenaries to široke. Grimm was mortally wounded on the bridge of Drakánc Hrad the day Košice disappeared. He had since vowed to undo his misdeeds against his lord by finding and protecting the young Košice. All parties arrive at a bar in široke within minutes of each other, leading to a large confrontation. The end result leaves many dead, Košice blinded and confused, and Genosik fleeing back to Groznyj. Lying dead in the snow, the aged knight, Velshin tells Grimm to bring Košice to Teardrop. During this time we are also introduced to Solare, an elf faerie, and his group of Lunatai hunting friends. Solare and his men are on a quest of vengeance to kill all the Lunatai for their horrid acts on faerie kind. Košice, Grimm, and the only survivor of Grimm's mercenary group eventually reach the floating city of teardrop. As they question how to gain access to the city, the workings of war stir in Groznyj's kingdom. Groznyj has asked the Lord Sialenec ze Tak Tak to lead an army against the knights of Teardrop. As Tak Tak raises his men, a female assassin he is quite fond of returns to his life. The assassin, Allysyn, is tasked with capture the other Drakonov child, Mikal's daughter, Erzebet

=== The Hollow (issues #7-9) ===
The Hollow tells the tale of Solare's group of warriors as well as that of Allysyn and her lover, Lane. Lane, an ex-teardrop knight, is introduced fighting a group of sickmen, zombie like undead creatures. We come to realize that Lane and Allysyn's mission is to track down Erzebet Drakanov, daughter of Mikal Drakanov. Erzebet was long ago kidnapped and held captive by pack of Lunatai. As fate would have it, Solare comes across the same pack of Lunatai that hold the Drakanov girl. Fearing Erzebet is soon to be Lunatai food, one of Solare's group dashes into combat to save the girl. Solare reluctantly follows, slaughtering many Lunatai. Unfortunately Lane soon enters the fray, choosing to also kill Solare and his ally, Jun. Lane leaves Solare for dead, having found Erzebet. Later that evening Jeeves, another victim of Lane's sword and butler to Erzebet Drakanov, comes across the badly damaged Solare. Solare rises from his seemingly dead state, healing with the speed expected of a faerie. Solare vows revenge on Lane for killing Jun. With the aid of Jeeves, Solare begins a hunt for Lane and Allysyn. During this journey, we learn of the language of the spiders and that Erzebet and Jeeves are both familiar with it. Erzebet leaves a trail of information through spider webs across the country side, allowing Jeeves to track her. Eventually the two warriors have their final clash outside a Brillianti church. Solare manages to kill both Allysyn and Lane, once more with the aid of Jeeves. Solare takes leave to continue his quest well Jeeves once more returns to the service of Miss Erzebet. After Solare has left, Erzebet uses a dark and hidden power of hers, reviving Allysyn and Lane as some form of undead servants. In Groznyj's dungeon we find the king talking with his imprisoned nephew, Mikal. There he tells Mikal of Erzebet's secret power, a power which Mikal cannot believe. As this story arc progresses, we are also introduced to The Brillianti's task force, The Chorus. The Chorus is to help Lord Tak Tak as an additional force in the war against the knights of Teardrop.

=== The Storm (issues #10-12) ===
After a few calm months living in teardrop, the council has gathered to discuss the fate of young Košice. At the same time, Lord Tak Tak's forces invade the floating city of teardrop, allied with The Chorus.
