= Jacques Faizant =

French caricaturist and editorial cartoonist

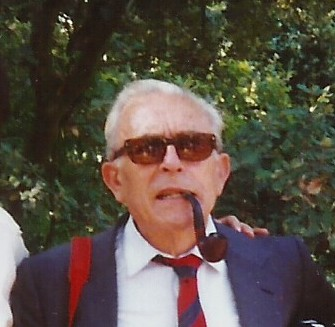
Jacques Faizant

Jacques Faizant (30 October 1918 in Laroquebrou - 14 January 2006 in Suresnes) was a French caricaturist and editorial cartoonist.

== Biography ==
The son of a carpenter, he attended school in Biarritz before enrolling at the hotel management school in Nice. He worked in the hotel industry for six years before turning to singing, cartoons, and humorous drawings, publishing his first drawing in 1942 in the newspaper Dimanche Illustré, but his career as an illustrator only really took off after the Liberation of France, when many new newspapers were created and he was able to easily find a market for his work.

In 1956, Marcel Dassault commissioned him to produce several wash drawings for the weekly magazine Jours de France. In 1958, he brought a drawing inspired by current events to the editor-in-chief of the newspaper Paris-Presse, to which he was a regular contributor. His drawing was published, and he provided others on a daily basis, related to current events.

On September 1, 1960, he became a political cartoonist for the French daily newspaper Le Figaro, where his artwork quickly became one of the paper's hallmarks. Forty years later (November 29, 1999), he was relegated to the inside pages of the newspaper, before leaving the paper on October 3, 2005, a few months before his death.

Le Figaro paid tribute to him from December 19 to 30, 2005, by publishing one of his iconic drawings every day, and on December 31, again in Le Figaro, seventeen cartoonists from all corners of the French press paid tribute to him. In its December 14, 2005 edition, the weekly magazine Charlie Hebdo devoted two pages to Jacques Faizant: much more scathing tributes were paid to him by Luz, Tignous,Riad Sattouf, etc., under the headline: Jacques Faizant retires, Charlie's cartoonists apply to Le Figaro.

He is the father of two children, the eldest Patrice and the youngest Michel. The latter also became a cartoonist under the pseudonym Chimulus.

Jacques Faizant died on January 14, 2006, at the Foch Hospital in Suresnes. His grave is located in the old cemetery in Rueil-Malmaison.
