= Yor the Hunter =

Comics character

Yor the Hunter (original: Henga el cazador, also known simply as Henga) is an Argentine comic series created in 1974 by writer Ray Collins (pseudonym of writer Eugenio Juan Zappietro) and artist Juan Zanotto. It appeared for the first time in the Argentine comics magazine Skorpio.

The saga is set at the beginning of the Neolithic Age, and revolves on the mysterious origins of the main character, a young and blonde hunter, and the mythical Atlantis. The world in which Yor lives is a mix of prehistoric tribes and animals (including dinosaurs and other monsters) and science fiction themes, in particular the last survivors of a very advanced civilization which is now on the verge of extinction. During the series, Hor, the son of Yor and also a young warrior, is introduced.

== Translation and adaptation ==
The comic appeared in the Italian magazine Lanciostory, starting with its first issue (#0) in 1975.

The 1983 Italian-French miniseries and film Yor, the Hunter from the Future are based on the comic.

In 2024, 50 years after its original publication, the series debuted in English under the title Yor: The Hunter from the Future, published by the American publisher Antarctic Press.

== Sources ==
- Gociol, Judith Nancy; Rosemberg, Diego (2000). La Historieta Argentina: Una Historia [Cartoon Argentina : A History] (in Spanish). De La Flor. p. 490. ISBN 978-950-515-568-2.
- Lorenzon, Luca (11 February 2013). "Ray Collins e le altre vite di Eugenio Zappietro (I)" [Ray Collins and the other lives of Eugenio Zappietro]. Fucine mute (in Italian).
