= David Austin (cartoonist) =

British cartoonist

David Austin (March 29, 1935 – November 19, 2005) was a British cartoonist. He was best known for his pocket cartoons in The Guardian, which he contributed from 1990 to 2005, and for the strip Hom Sap in Private Eye, which began in 1970. The Guardian's obituary said that he "was one of the central pillars in what made the paper important to its readers."

He has had a train named after him by his widow, Janet.
