= Sorcery 101 =

Webcomic by Kel Mcdonald

- Author: Kel McDonald
- Website: sorcery101.net
- Current status/schedule: M
- Launch date: May 12, 2005
- End date: October 17, 2016
- Genre: Fantasy

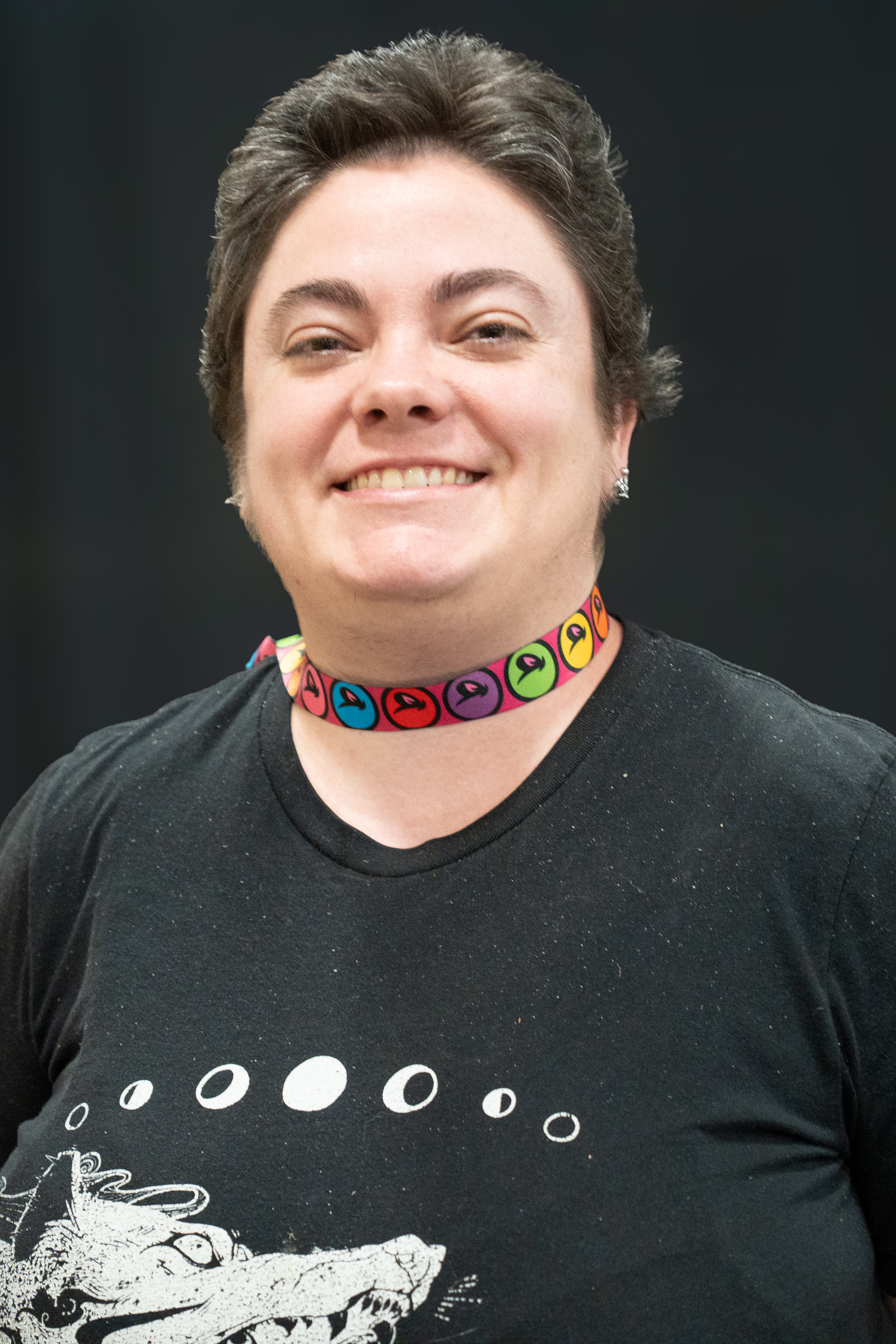
Kel McDonald at Comic Con Oakland 2026

Sorcery 101 was a webcomic written and illustrated by American artist Kel McDonald. Launched on May 12, 2005, the comic was originally drawn in black and white, but became full color on August 19, 2005.

Sorcery 101 first appeared on Comicgenesis and moved to Keenspot on July 27, 2006. The story, which is completed as of Oct 17, 2016, chronicles the life of Danny Gunn, a school teacher who is also an aspiring sorcerer. The comic has now left Keenspot and moved to Sorcery101.net.

While the comic has a largely supernatural cast, the storyline deals primarily with interpersonal relationships. The comic presents werewolves, vampires, and demons as essentially "normal" people dealing with their own talents and limitations.

Kel used the site Kickstarter to fund the first collection book.

== Story ==
Sorcery 101 follows the life and troubles of Danny Gunn who is the former prince of Terra, a fictional country in the universe based roughly on England, but Danny is now a sorcerer-in-training, as well as a private school teacher. Along with a myriad cast of his friends and acquaintances, including but not limited to: his best friend Brad Wolfe; Brad's wife Ally and their daughter Rebecca; Danny's teacher, a vampire named Pat Warren; and the enigmatic elder vampire Seth, who has his own plans for Danny.

The story is set on a modern world closely resembling our own, but there are notable differences. In the series, vampires, demons, and werewolves have recently been discovered to be real, though most residents of this world still believe they are a hoax. The comic has a feel different from most supernatural comics. The story has modern firearms in use as well as ancient magics; cities and countries are named differently, but nevertheless seem to "match up" to real-world countries, such as Terra to the United Kingdom. Many works of popular culture like the film Star Wars and the TV show Avatar: The Last Airbender appear in the Sorcery 101 world. There are comics that are mildly amusing, but the main focus is on the story.

Final Notes from the writer of Sorcery 101

== Characters ==
=== Danny Gunn ===
Danny Gunn is the main character of Sorcery 101. Born the prince of Terra, Danny gives up his royal heritage after forming a blood bond with Seth. Though the webcomic begins several years afterward, Danny looks younger than 35 years old, because the blood bond has also stopped his aging. Throughout the webcomic, he is shown to be a chain smoker and easily distracted by women. Some time before the story begins, he moved in with his friends, Brad and Ally Wolfe, in order to help babysit their rambunctious and preternaturally strong 5-year-old werewolf daughter Rebecca.

Danny has an ex-wife and a seven-year-old daughter named Natalie, both of whom have appeared in the story so far. Danny is teaching Con Law at a private all-boys high school wherein Jeff and Connor were in his class. Danny is taught sorcery by the vampire Pat Warren. Danny casts healing and fire spells in the webcomic, although according to Pat he also knows some powerful light spells.

=== Brad Wolfe ===
Brad Wolfe is a werewolf and long-time friend of Danny. Brad is presented as shy and non-confrontational. the only time he has shown any violent behavior was when Ally was injured during the story arc "Wild Things." Brad sports wolf-like characteristics throughout Sorcery 101 while in human form, such as increased strength and being colorblind. Like Danny, Brad looks younger than he really is.

=== Pat Warren ===
Pat Warren is a vampire who teaches Danny sorcery. Pat used to be an "air mage". He learned sorcery after he was turned into a vampire, because his mage powers have faded since then. He has a hatred for inhuman creatures, and being one himself he has a very hostile disposition. Pat also dislikes Brad since they first met during the "Introduction" story arc. Despite his dislike of werewolves and because of some trickery by Seth, Pat is protecting Jeff from capture by other vampires. Later in the webcomic, it is revealed that Pat is Ally's great-grandfather.

=== Ally Warren ===
Ally Warren is an air mage and demon hunter. She is married to Brad and is the boss of the house she, Brad, Danny, and Rebecca live in. Ally works as a manager of a bar frequented by demons. She has been shown to have a temper when it comes to people insulting her family.

=== Rebecca Wolfe ===
Rebecca is Brad and Ally's 5-year-old daughter. She has inherited lycanthropy from Brad, making her hard to handle for anyone who isn't a werewolf. She often gets into trouble and was the cause of Jeff's lycanthropy when she bit him whilst he was watching her.

=== Seth ===
Seth is the vampire character to whom Danny is blood bond. Since his first appearance during the "Predator" storyline, he is portrayed as a smooth, suave, and an almost sociopathic guy. He created a blood bond with Danny and apparently has a claim on Brad. He keeps an eye over them both, more often than not at the promise of scotch. He is apparently quite famous in the vampiric community, with legends that he may be a storm god, the Antichrist, or—his favorite rumor—that he was kicked out of Hell for fear of taking it over. Seth is hated by most people who know him. Unlike other vampires, he can endure sunlight without dying.

== Chapters ==
There are 38 total chapters for Sorcery 101 The list below may be incomplete.

Introduction - Here most of the main cast is introduced (with the exception of Seth). Danny has a sorcery lesson from Pat. Brad and Danny go to rent a movie but Danny gets into an argument with a kid that claims to know necromancy but is almost as inept, if not more, at magic of any type as Danny.

Predators - Danny drives Ally to work and runs into a female snake demon. The snake demon invites him back to her hotel room and once there she robs Danny. Since Brad is at the movies, Ally is at work, and Pat is sleeping, Danny is forced to ask Seth for help.

Life Lessons - One of Danny's students steals his spell book and tries to cast a love spell on the girl he likes. It backfires and ends up affecting Connor instead.

Wild Things - Danny and Brad are captured by a group of wolf demons. Ally and Pat come to the rescue and quickly defeat the demons. Ally, Brad, and Danny go home while Pat chases after the demons that fled. Pat finds the demons killed before he can reach them. A few days later Danny is babysitting Rebecca while tutoring Jeff. Danny takes a cigarette break and leaves the room. Rebecca ends up biting Jeff. Ally and Danny go to stake out his house that next full moon but unfortunately Jeff is out drinking with his friend Connor. Jeff ends up puking in an alley and transforms shortly after. Two vampires capture him and he is put up for auction. Seth sees Jeff and later mentions it in passing to Danny. Danny, Brad, and Seth then go to rescue Jeff from a vampire named Suryu, who is the one selling him. Seth comes up with a master plan and ends up in a duel with her.

Responsibilities - Ally, Danny, and Pat go help Ally's cousin Rita handle a gang of demons.

Old Allies - While retrieving a book for Pat, Danny learns about Pat's past from William.

Out Come the Wolves - Danny is accidentally bitten by Brad while a bounty hunter is trying to kill Brad.

Business as Usual - Ally, Brad, and Danny break Ally's mom out of prison.

Migraines - Danny tries to find out what is wrong with his daughter in this chapter.

Attention to Detail - Danny and Pat are hired to help rescue a woman from Danny's cousin, Damien

My Permanent Accessory - While Ally is at a party with her boss, Seth pushes a drunk Brad to do something stupid.

Glass Houses - Pat goes to ask Ally for help and instead gets help from Brad.

New Class - School starts again and Danny is surprised to find out who one of his new students is.

Holding out for a Hero - Damien shows up threatens Danny and kidnaps Melanie.

Frequently Secretly - Jeff thinks his friend Connor might know he's a werewolf.

Fathers - A friend of Brad's father asks him for help after finding out Brad's a werewolf.

Ways of a Woman in Love - Trish and Seth explain how they met.

Orders - Pat and Ally are arrested by the Mage Council.

== Development ==
Speaking of adblocking in 2018, MacDonald said that the popularity of Sorcery 101 remained relatively stable between 2010 and 2016, but that her advertising revenue went down from nearly $18,000 USD per year to roughly $4,000 USD per year.
