= Lanciostory =

Italian comic magazine

- Categories: Comic magazine
- Frequency: Weekly
- Publisher: Eura editoriale - Editoriale Aurea
- Founded: 1975
- Final issue: April 2026
- Country: Italy
- Based in: Rome
- Language: Italian

Lanciostory, sometimes spelled as Lancio Story or LancioStory, is an Italian weekly comic magazine published from April 1975 until April 2026.

== History and profile ==
Lanciostory was created in 1975 by Editrice Lancio to target the adult audience interested in comics who had marked the contemporary success of comics magazines such as Il Monello and Intrepido. The first issue, #0, was released in April 1975 attached to the Lancio-edited fotoromanzi magazine Le Avventure di Jacques Douglas. The magazine was originally published by Eura editoriale based in Rome, then, starting from 2010, by its successor Editoriale Aurea.

The magazine initially mainly published works by South-American and especially Argentine authors, including Carlos Trillo, Juan Giménez, Enrique Breccia, Francisco Solano López, Ernesto García Seijas, Enrique Alcatena, Eduardo Mazzitelli, Juan Zanotto. Italian collaborators included Franco Saudelli, Paolo Eleuteri Serpieri and Massimo Rotundo. From the late 1970s Lanciostory started publishing Franco-Belgian comics.

Series which were introduced in the magazine include The Eternaut (the first series by Héctor Oesterheld and Francisco Solano López), Dago, Jeremiah, John Doe, Nippur de Lagash, Mort Cinder and Dracula in the West also published in USA by Antarctic Press.

Each issue consisted of about 6-7 episodic comics, plus several columns about cinema, sport and entertainment.

== See also ==
- List of magazines published in Italy
