= Juan Zanotto =

Italian-born Argentine comic book artist

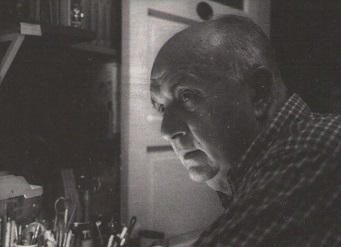
- Born: Giovanni Zanotto; September 26, 1935 Cuceglio, Italy
- Died: April 13, 2005 (aged 69) Buenos Aires, Argentina
- Area: artist
- Pseudonym: Vanni
- Notable works: Henga; Bárbara; Falka

Juan Zanotto (Giovanni Zanotto, September 26, 1935 – April 13, 2005) was an Italian-born Argentine comic book artist who worked both in Europe and Argentina.

== Biography ==
Panels from Bárbara.

Born in Cuceglio, in the province of Turin (Piedmont), Zanotto moved with his family at age thirteen to Argentina. There he studied at the North American School of Art (later the Pan-American School of Art).

In 1953 he started to work at Editorial Codex where he worked on stories by other authors, and in subsequent years did adventure comics, westerns and drew early stories for Tatin and The Phantom.

In 1955, with writings by Alfredo Grassi, he created Ric de la Frontera, and that same year began working on El Mundo del hombre rojo (Indian legends of North America). In 1958 he began an association with the English publisher Fleetway. In 1965 he took the position of artistic director at Editorial Codex and did various covers and illustrations. In 1974 he became artistic director of Ediciones Record.

With Ray Collins (Eugenio Zappietro) he created the fanta-prehistoric Henga (Yor in Italian) using his and Diego Navarro's scripts (the 1983 film Yor, the Hunter from the Future was based on this graphic novel), the western Wakantanka with scripts by Héctor Germán Oesterheld, and the science fiction Bárbara (1979–1983) and Nueva York año cero (in 1984 for la EPC of Rome), both written by Ricardo Barreiro, Cronicas del Tiempo Medio ("Chronicles of the Middle Time") written by Emilio Balcarce and Penitenciario with scripts by Barreiro.

The United States publisher Eclipse Comics published Nueva York año cero and Crónicas del Tiempo Medio in the late 1980s. In 1991 he drew War Man, a graphic novel for Marvel Comics, written by Chuck Dixon and published in 2 parts in Heavy Hitters' Epic Comics. Falka, the continuation of Horizontes Perdidos of 1993, was Zanotto's first work also as a writer, and lasted until 2003.

Juan Zanotto died in 2005 in Buenos Aires, Argentina.

== Partial bibliography ==
Album cover of Falka (French edition) #1.

- Henga, el cazador (1974, written by Ray Collins)
- Wakantanka (1976, written by Héctor Germán Oesterheld)
- Barbara (1979, written by Ricardo Barreiro)
- Nueva York año cero (1984, written by Ricardo Barreiro)
- Cronicas del Tiempo Medio (written by Emilio Balcarce)
- Penitenciario (1989, written by Ricardo Barreiro)
- Horizontes Perdidos (Falka, 1993)
- Los Ladrones del Tiempo, (1998)
