= Skorpio (magazine) =

Argentine-Italian comics magazine

- Cover of Skorpio featuring La Saga del Sur by Arturo Del Castillo and Ricardo Barreiro, June 1994.
- Categories: Comic magazine
- Frequency: Weekly
- Founded: 1974–1996; 1977–present
- Country: Argentina; Italy
- Language: Spanish; Italian
- ISSN: 1122-8776

Skorpio is a weekly anthology comic magazine published in Argentina from 1974 to 1996 and in Italy from 1977 onward.

== History and profile ==
With Juan Zanotto serving as the artistic supervisor and Alfredo Scutti working as the editorial director, Ediciones Récord launched Skorpio in July 1974. It is named after a character created by writer Eugenio Zappietro (under the pen name Ray Collins) and artist Ernesto R. Garcia Seijas. Because of the artistic freedom it granted, the magazine attracted all the major Argentine comic artists of the time.

The magazine had immediate success. Series which were introduced in the magazine include Bárbara by Ricardo Barreiro and Juan Zanotto, Yor the Hunter by Zappietro and Zanotto, and Alvar Mayor by Carlos Trillo and Enrique Breccia. Skorpio also republished Argentine classic comics such as Mort Cinder, Sergeant Kirk, and El Eternauta.

The magazine eventually closed in Argentina in 1996.

=== Italian version ===
An Italian version of the magazine was launched in Italy in 1977 by Lancio Editore (later Eura Editoriale, replaced in 2010 by Editoriale Aurea), the same publisher of Lanciostory. Initially devoted almost entirely to Argentine productions, since the early 1980s the magazine gradually started including Italian and French-Belgian comics, and more rarely also American comics. The magazine was published weekly from March 1977. It ceased publications in April 2026 with #2259

Series published include Cybersix, Gilgamesh, Alvar Mayor, Xena, the namesake Skorpio, Bogey, La Quête de l'oiseau du temps, Yor and Hor by Zanotto, Nippur de Lagash,, Dago

A weekly collection series, Raccolta Skorpio, was published in 2000.

== See also ==
- List of magazines in Argentina
- List of magazines in Italy
