= Carlos Trillo =

Argentine comic book writer

- Born: May 1, 1943 Buenos Aires, Argentina
- Died: May 8, 2011 (aged 68) London, England
- Area: Writer
- Notable works: Cybersix; El Negro Blanco; El Loco Chávez; Las Puertitas del Sr. López; La grande arnaque (The Big Hoax); Borderline; Clara de noche
- Awards: Full list

Carlos Trillo (May 1, 1943 – May 8, 2011) was an Argentine comic book writer, best known worldwide as the co-creator and writer of the Cybersix comics. With a long and prolific career in the Historieta medium, he is considered as one of Argentina's most respected and renowned comics writers.

== Biography ==
Born in Buenos Aires, Trillo began a prolific career as writer at the age of 20, penning his first story for Patoruzú magazine. Trillo, together with Horacio Altuna, created the strip El Loco Chávez, which appeared every day at the back of the newspaper Clarín from July 26, 1975 to November 10, 1987. After that, the strip was replaced by El Negro Blanco, which he wrote for the artist Ernesto García Seijas until September 1993.

He participated in the creation of several comics including Cybersix in 1992, with Carlos Meglia, and the erotic Clara de noche and Cicca Dum Dum series with Jordi Bernet. He has also collaborated with Alberto Breccia and Alejandro Dolina.

In 1999, his work La grande arnaque (The Big Hoax) won the Prize for Scenario at the Angoulême International Comics Festival.

Trillo died suddenly in London on May 8 of 2011, after suffering a heart attack while on holiday with his wife.

== Personal life ==
Trillo was married to children's and fiction writer Ema Wolf, and they had two children.

== Awards ==
- 1978: Yellow Kid e Gran Guinigi Award, Lucca, Italy, for Best International Author
- 1984: Barcelona International Comics Convention, Premio al mejor guionista del año
- 1996: Yellow Kid Award, Lucca, Italy, for Best International Author
- 1999: Angoulême Festival, Prize for Scenario, for La grande anarque (The Big Hoax)

== Bibliography ==
Cover for Iguana, a collaboration with Mandrafina

With Horacio Altuna

- El Loco Chávez
- Las puertitas del Sr. López
- Merdichesky
- El último recreo
- Tragaperras
- Charlie Moon

With Jordi Bernet

- Clara de noche
- Light & Bold
- Ivan Piire
- Cicca Dum Dum

With Eduardo Risso

- Video Noire
- Fúlu
- Boy Vampire
- Borderline
- Chicanos

With Domingo Roberto Mandrafina

- Dragger
- The Big Hoax
- The Iguana
- Historias mudas
- El contorsionista
- Spaghetti Brothers

With Lucas Varela

- El Síndrome Guastavino
- El Cuerno Escarlata
- Sasha Despierta

With Alberto Breccia

- Un tal Daneri (1975-1977)
- Nadie (1977-1978)
- Buscavidas (1981-1984)

Others

- Cybersix (with Carlos Meglia)
- Alvar Mayor (1977–1982, with Enrique Breccia)
- Sick Bird (with Juan Bobillo)

== Sources ==
- Carlos Trillo French albums Bedetheque (in French)
- Carlos Trillo publications in English www.europeancomics.net (in English)
