= 2012 in comics =

Notable events of 2012 in comics. It includes any relevant comics-related events, deaths of notable comics-related people, conventions and first issues by title.

== Events ==
=== January ===
- January 2: The first episode of Norm Feuti's Gil is published.
- January 8: The long-running gag comic Ferd'nand publishes its final episode.
- January 17: Siegfried Woldhek wins the Inktspotprijs for Best Political Cartoon.

=== February ===
- The final episode of Liberty Meadows by Frank Cho is published.

=== March ===
- March 10–11: During the Stripdagen in Haarlem Eric Heuvel is awarded the Stripschapprijs, while Ron Poland, known for the distribution company Strips In Voorraad, wins the P. Hans Frankfurtherprijs. Patty Klein wins the Bulletje en Boonestaak Schaal.
- March 26: Nicole Hollander discontinues Sylvia.

=== April ===
- April 11: The final episode of Brian Wood's Northlanders is published.
- April 17: Stan Lee launches his own YouTube channel, Stan Lee's World of Heroes.
- April 22: The first episode of Dana Simpson's Phoebe and Her Unicorn is published.

=== May ===
- May 5: The final episode of Claudio Nizzi's and Giancarlo Alessandrini's Rosco & Sonny is published.
- May 9: The comic strip Crock publishes its final episode, one year after the death of its original creator Bill Rechin.
- Mark Waid, Peter Krause and Diego Barreto's Irredeemable comes to an end. Another series by Waid, Incorruptible, ends the same month.

=== June ===
- June 16: Matt Groening's Life in Hell comes to an end after 35 years of continuous publication.

=== August ===
- August 30: A statue of the comics character Meneer Pheip is inaugurated in Moerbeke-Waas, Belgium.
- The final episode of Kei Sanbe's Mōryō no Yurikago is published.

=== September ===
- September 23: Richard Thompson's Cul de Sac comes to an end, as Thompson's battles with health issues.
- September 27: Yasaunobu Yamauchi's Daily Lives of High School Boys is discontinued.

=== October ===
- October 16: Phil Dunlap's Ink Pen is discontinued.

=== November ===
- November 29: The Bazooka Joe comics, which appeared on Bazooka chewing gum wrappers for more than five decades are discontinued.
- The final issue of Faust: Love of the Damned by David Quinn and Tim Vigil is published.

=== December ===
- December 3: The long-running British comics magazine The Dandy publishes its final issue in print. It continues as an online comic the same day, but within six months it ends there too.

=== Specific date unknown ===
- The long-running newspaper comic Bristow by Frank Dickens comes to an end.
- Julia Gfrörer publishes her graphic novel Black Is The Color.

== Exhibitions ==
- February 24–March 18: "Cartoonists’ Wheel of Life" (Rubin Museum of Art, New York City) — featuring a group project on the Tibetan Wheel of Life, or Bhavacakra, by Molly Crabapple, Michael Kupperman, Josh Neufeld, Katie Skelly, Steven Guarnaccia, Sanya Glisic, Ben Granoff, and Rodney Alan Greenblat
- March–April 18: "Ka-Pow! Comics and Cartoons in Contemporary Culture" (Lipscomb University, Nashville, Tennessee) — exhibition of the work of modern artists like Roy Lichtenstein alongside their original comic book sources; curated by Rocky Horton
- April 13–August 19: "Crumb: De l'Underground à la Genèse", Musée d'Art Moderne de la Ville de Paris (Paris, France) — R. Crumb career retrospective
- April 14–August 12: "Modern Cartoonist: The Art of Daniel Clowes", Oakland Museum of California (Oakland, California) — curated by Susan Miller and René de Guzman
- September: The Batman Live stage show began its U.S. tour in Anaheim, California.
- September 14, 2012 – January 13, 2013: "Spain: Rock, Roll, Rumbles, Rebels & Revolution", Burchfield Penney Art Center (Buffalo State College, Buffalo, New York)
- October 13, 2012 – January 31, 2013: "Frank Stack at 75", State Historical Society of Missouri (University of Missouri, Columbia, Missouri)

== Conventions ==
- January 26–29: Angoulême International Comics Festival (Angoulême, France) — 220,000 attendees
- January 28–29: Wizard World New Orleans (Ernest N. Morial Convention Center, New Orleans, Louisiana) — guests: Carlos Pacheco, George Pérez, Jesus Merino, Félix Ruiz, Tyler Kirkham, Barry Kitson, Greg Horn, Bernie Wrightson, Norm Breyfogle, and Arthur Suydam
- February 10–12: What the Hell?! Con (Greensboro, North Carolina)
- February 17–19: MegaCon (Orange County Convention Center, Orlando, Florida, US) — guests include Amanda Conner, Chuck Dixon, Paul Gulacy, Phil Hester, Rob Hunter, Dan Jurgens, Jimmy Palmiotti, George Pérez, Stephane Roux, Frank Tieri, Tim Townsend, William Tucci, Ethan Van Sciver, and Zeb Wells
- February 25–26: London Super Comic Convention (London, England, UK)
- March 3–4: STAPLE! (Marchesa Hall and Theater, Austin, Texas) — special guests: Kevin Eastman, Jason Neulander, Brian Hurtt, Cullen Bunn, Monica Gallagher, Liz Prince, Kagan McLeod, and MariNaomi
- March 10–11: Toronto ComiCON Fan Appreciation Event (Metro Toronto Convention Centre, Toronto, Ontario, Canada)
- March 16–18: WonderCon (Anaheim Convention Center, Anaheim, California) — con moves from San Francisco because the Moscone Center under construction. Guests include Arthur Adams, Sergio Aragonés, Ernest Cline, Renae De Liz, Mark Evanier, Michael Golden, Joe Hill, Rebekah Isaaks, Richard Kadrey, Carol Lay, Jim Lee, Mike Mignola, Todd Nauck, Steve Niles, Eric Powell, Humberto Ramos, Bob Schreck, Scott Snyder, Ryan Sook, Fiona Staples, Richard Starkings, J. Michael Straczynski, Mark Waid, Wil Wheaton, and Marv Wolfman
- March 31–April 1: Hi-Ex (Eden Court Theatre, Inverness, Scotland) — guests include Michael Carroll, Al Ewing, John Higgins, Sally Hurst, and Chris Murray
- March 31: New York Comic Book Marketplace (Penn Plaza Pavilion, New York City, US) — final Big Apple Comic Con, with show having been sold to Wizard Entertainment. Guest of honor: Stan Lee; other guests include George Pérez, Joe Sinnott, Dick Ayers, Carmine Infantino, Jim Steranko, Irwin Hasen, Mike Royer, Arthur Suydam, Bob McLeod, Rich Buckler, and Johnny Brennan
- April 13–15: Chicago Comic & Entertainment Expo (C2E2) (Chicago, Illinois, US)
- April 13–14: Wildcat Comic Con (Pennsylvania College of Technology, Williamsport, Pennsylvania, US) — guests include Walter Koenig, David Small, Dean Haspiel, and Josh Neufeld
- April 14–15: Wizard World Toronto (Metro Toronto Convention Centre, North Building, Toronto, Ontario, Canada)
- April 21: FLUKE Mini-Comics & Zine Festival (40 Watt, Athens, Georgia)
- April 20–22: Pittsburgh Comicon (Monroeville Convention Center, Monroeville, Pennsylvania, US) — guests include Bob Almond, Jim Balent, Darryl Banks, Eric Basaldua, Brett Breeding, Robert Brewer, J. Scott Campbell, Tommy Castillo, Daxiong, Ron Frenz, Holly G, Adela Garcia, Mike Grell, Scott Hedlund, Terry Huddleston, Barry Kitson, Robert Kraus, Stan Lee, Adam Mayfield, Peter Mayhew, Scott McDaniel, Paul Monsky, Chris Moreno, Rudy Nebres, Mike Okamoto, Pat Olliffe, George Pérez, Ian Petrella, Budd Root, Alex Saviuk, Stuart Sayger, Larry Thomas, Tim Vigil, Neil Vokes, Lee Weeks, and Ron Wilson
- April 21–22: Small Press and Alternative Comics Expo (S.P.A.C.E.) (Ramada Plaza Hotel & Conference Center, Columbus, Ohio)
- April 27–29: Calgary Comic & Entertainment Expo (Calgary, Alberta, Canada)
- April 28–29:
  - MoCCA Festival (69th Regiment Armory, New York City, US)
  - Stumptown Comics Fest (Oregon Convention Center, Portland, Oregon, US)
- May 2: Asbury Park Comic Con I (Asbury Lanes, Asbury, New Jersey) — official guests include Evan Dorkin, Sarah Dyer, Stephanie Buscema, Jamal Igle, Steve Mannion, and Mike Zapcic & Ming Chen of Comic Book Men
- May 5–6: Toronto Comic Arts Festival (Toronto Reference Library, Toronto, Canada)
- May 12–13: Comic Expo (Passenger Shed of Brunel Old Station, Bristol, UK) — guests include Paul Cornell, Ian Churchill, and Mark Buckingham; guest of honor Dennis O'Neil unable to attend. The show attracts only 300 attendees, with many exhibitors reporting losses; there is speculation the show might not survive.
- May 18–20: Motor City Comic Con (Suburban Collection Showplace, Novi, Michigan, US) — guests include Billy Tucci, Mike Grell, Ethan Van Sciver, Peter Bagge, Joseph Lee, Nichelle Nichols, Colin Ferguson, Dean Cain, Loni Anderson, Howard Hesseman, Billy Dee Williams, Christopher Knight, Butch Patrick, and Erin Gray
- May 18–19: East Coast Black Age of Comics Convention (Philadelphia, Pennsylvania) — guests include William H. Foster, III, Alex Simmons, and Eric Battle; presentation of the Glyph Comics Awards
- May 19–20:
  - BigWow Comicfest (San Jose Convention Center, San Jose, California) — guests include Travis Charest, Juanjo Guarnido, Thomas Jane, Jim Lee, Toshio Maeda, Steve Niles, Kevin Nowlan, Bernie Wrightson, and Terrance Zdunich
  - Dallas Comic Con (Irving Convention Center at Las Colinas, Irving, Texas, US) — c.20,000 attendees; guests include Stan Lee, Neal Adams, George Pérez, Len Wein, Arthur Suydam, Jimmy Palmiotti, Cully Hamner, Brian Stelfreeze, Norm Breyfogle, Greg Horn, Mitch Breitweiser, Elizabeth Breitweiser, Alex Saviuk, Sam DeLarosa, Guo Jingxiong, Steve Erwin, and Kristian Donaldson
  - Kapow! Comic Convention (London Business Design Centre, London, UK) — 2nd iteration of this event
- May 24–27: Phoenix Comicon (Phoenix Convention Center, Phoenix, Arizona, US)
- May 30–June 2: Wizard World Philadelphia (Pennsylvania Convention Center, Philadelphia, Pennsylvania, US)
- June 2–3: Stripdagen Haarlem (Grote Markt, Haarlem, the Netherlands)
- June 15–17: Denver Comic Con (Denver Convention Center exhibit hall, Denver, Colorado)
- June 16–17: Chicago Alternative Comics Expo (Columbia College Chicago's Ludington Building, Chicago, Illinois) — first iteration of CAKE; special guests included Jeffrey Brown, Lilli Carré, Anders Nilsen, Closed Caption Comics, Paul Hornschemeier, Lucy Knisley, Anne Elizabeth Moore, Corinne Mucha, Laura Park, Pizza Island, John Porcellino, Nate Powell, and Trubble Club
- June 22–24: Heroes Convention (Charlotte Convention Center, Charlotte, North Carolina, US) — guests include Neal Adams, Bob Almond, Jim Amash, Robert Atkins, Mark Bagley, Jeremy Bastian, Ivan Brandon, June Brigman, Pat Broderick, Mark Brooks, Jeffrey Brown, Stephanie Buscema, Scott C., Jim Calafiore, Ben Caldwell, Dennis Calero, Nick Cardy, Richard Case, Bernard Chang, Sean Chen, Cliff Chiang, Frank Cho, Mike Choi, Brian Clevinger, Becky Cloonan, Paty Cockrum, Dave Cooper, Colleen Coover, Clayton Crain, Jeremy Dale, Geof Darrow, Shane Davis, Todd Dezago, Michael Dooney, Evan Dorkin, Sarah Dyer, Nathan Edmondson, Tommy Lee Edwards, Steve Epting, Michael Eury, Michel Fiffe, Ian Flynn, Matt Fraction, Francesco Francavilla, Gary Friedrich, Christos Gage, Nick Galifianakis, Ron Garney, Bryan J. L. Glass, Michael Golden, Keron Grant, Cully Hamner, Scott Hampton, Scott Hanna, Dustin Harbin, Tony Harris, Tom Hart, Jeremy Haun, Clayton Henry, Jaime Hernandez, Jonathan Hickman, Adam Hughes, Jamal Igle, Kathryn Immonen, Stuart Immonen, Georges Jeanty, Matt Kindt, Aaron Kuder, Roger Langridge, Jason Latour, Bob Layton, Stan Lee, Jeff Lemire, Paul Levitz, Mike Lilly, Joseph Michael Linsner, Tom Lyle, Heidi MacDonald, David W. Mack, David Marquez, Laura Martin, Ron Marz, Jose Marzan, Jr., Nathan Massengill, Paul Maybury, Ed McGuinness, Bob McLeod, Mike Mignola, B. Clay Moore, Chris Moreno, Mark Nelson, Steve Niles, Cary Nord, Earl Norem, Phil Noto, Jason Pearson, Andrew Pepoy, George Pérez, David Petersen, Brandon Peterson, Ed Piskor, Chris Pitzer, Brian Ralph, Tom Raney, Ivan Reis, Andrew Robinson, Budd Root, Don Rosa, Craig Rousseau, Stéphane Roux, Jim Rugg, Andy Runton, Tim Sale, Alex Saviuk, Bob Schreck, Tom Scioli, Bill Sienkiewicz, Louise Simonson, Walt Simonson, Scott Snyder, Charles Soule, Matthew Southworth, Joe Staton, Ryan Stegman, Brian Stelfreeze, Karl Story, Romeo Tanghal, Ben Templesmith, Mark Texeira, Roy Thomas, Jill Thompson, Rich Tommaso, Tim Townsend, Herb Trimpe, Dean Trippe, William Tucci, Koi Turnbull, Rob Ullman, Ethan Van Sciver, Robert Venditti, Tim Vigil, Dexter Vines, Chris Walker, Loston Wallace, Michael W. Watkins, Lee Weeks, Brett Weldele, Shane White, Jarrett Williams, Bill Willingham, Renée Witterstaetter, Marv Wolfman, J. K. Woodward, Bernie Wrightson, Skottie Young, Mike Zeck, and Chrissie Zullo
- June 29–July 2: Florida SuperCon (Miami Airport Convention Center, Miami, Florida, US)
- July 6–8: London Film and Comic Con (Olympia Grand Hall, London, England, UK)
- July 12–15: San Diego Comic-Con (San Diego Convention Center, San Diego, California, US)
- August 9–12: Wizard World Chicago (Donald E. Stephens Convention Center, Rosemont, Illinois) — official guests: William Shatner, Jeri Ryan, Stan Lee, Jon Bernthal, CM Punk, Carlos Pacheco, George Pérez, Greg Capullo, Nina Dobrev, Kate Mulgrew, Bruce Campbell, Tom Felton, and Amy Acker
- August 18–19: CAPTION 2012 Summer Special (Oxford, England, UK)
- August 23–26: Fan Expo Canada (Metro Toronto Convention Centre, Toronto, Ontario, Canada) — over 80,000 attendees expected
- August 31–September 3: Dragon Con (Atlanta, Georgia, US)
- September 14–16: Montreal Comiccon (Palais des congrès de Montréal, Montreal, Quebec, Canada) — guests include William Shatner (Guest of Honour), Wil Wheaton, Brent Spiner, John de Lancie, Malcolm McDowell, James Marsters, Nicholas Brendon, Laura Vandervoort, Mike Mignola, Gunnar Hansen, Lloyd Kaufman, Kevin Sorbo, Ben Templesmith, and Frank Cho
- September 15–16:
  - Small Press Expo (Marriott Bethesda North Hotel & Conference Center, Bethesda, Maryland, US) — special guests: Dan Clowes, Chris Ware, Gilbert & Jaime Hernandez
  - Stan Lee's Comikaze (Los Angeles Convention Center, Los Angeles, California, US) — guests of honor: Stan Lee, Todd McFarlane, Marc Silvestri, Jhonen Vasquez
- September 28–30: Wizard World Ohio Comic Con (Greater Columbus Convention Center, Columbus, Ohio, US) — guests include Dean Cain, Lou Ferrigno, Jorge Molina, Greg Horn, Arthur Suydam, Mike McKone, Tom Batiuk, Chad Cicconi, Stuart Sayger, and Dirk Strangely
- September 29:
  - Asbury Park Comic Con (Asbury Lanes, Asbury Park, New Jersey) — official guests include Evan Dorkin, Sarah Dyer, Dean Haspiel, Reilly Brown, Curls Studio, and Mike Zapcic & Ming Chen of Comic Book Men
  - Massachusetts Independent Comics Expo [MICE] (University Hall, Lesley University, Cambridge, Massachusetts) — guest of honor: R. Sikoryak
- October 1–4: Lucca Comics and Games (Lucca, Italy)
- October 11–14:
  - Komikazen (Ravenna, Italy) — guests include Shout and Carlos Latuff
  - New York Comic Con (Jacob K. Javits Convention Center, New York City, US) —116,000 attendees; notable guests include Clark Gregg, Adam West
- October 13–14: Alternative Press Expo (Concourse Exhibition Center, San Francisco, California, US)
- October 19–21: Dallas Comic Con (Irving Convention Center . Irving, Texas) — official guests include Stan Lee, Bruce Campbell, Robert Englund, Tom Felton, and Sean Astin
- October 26–28: Detroit Fanfare (Hyatt Regency, Dearborn, Michigan, US)
- November 2–30: Comica — London International Comics Festival (various venues, London, UK) — guests include Aline Kominsky-Crumb, Robert Crumb, Bryan Talbot, Glyn Dillon, Jaromir 99, Alison Bechdel, Kevin O'Neill, Posy Simmonds, Oliver Frey, Joann Sfar, Karrie Fransman, Simone Lia, Sarah McIntyre, Dave McKean, Rachel Cooke, Othon Mataragas, Doo-Ho Lee, Hyung Min-woo, Jeong-Taek Chae, Jung-hyun Suk, ILYA, David Hine, Anke Feuchtenberger, Line Hoven, Christina Plaka, Andreas Knigge, Andrzej Klimowski, Emma Vieceli
- November 2–4: Central Canada Comic Con (Winnipeg, Manitoba, Canada)
- November 3–4: Rhode Island Comic Con (Rhode Island Convention Center, Providence, Rhode Island, US) — inaugural edition of this show
- November 10: Comica Comiket (Great Hall, Bishopsgate Institute, London, England) — Drawing Parade participants include Bryan Talbot, Glyn Dillon, Line Hoven, Jaromir 99, Alison Bechdel
- November 24: Genghis Con (Beachland Ballroom and Tavern, Cleveland, Ohio) — guests include Derf Backderf, Ed Piskor, Frank Santoro, and Gary Dumm

== Deaths ==
=== January ===
- January 3: Vicar, Chilean cartoonist (Mitigüeso Pistolero, Disney comics), dies at age 77.
- January 4: Richard Alf, American businessman, comic book store owner and co-founder of San Diego Comic-Con, dies at age 59, of pancreatic cancer.
- January 6: John Celardo, American comic strip and comic book artist best known for illustrating the Tarzan comic strip, dies at age 93.
- January 31: Antonio Segura, Spanish comics writer (Hombre, Bogey, Sarvan, Kraken, Jack el Destipador, Eva Medusa), dies at age 69.

=== February ===
- February 12: John Severin, American comics artist (Two-Fisted Tales, Frontline Combat, Mad, Cracked, Sgt. Fury and his Howling Commandos, Two-Gun Kid), dies at age 90.
- February 13: Francesco Gamba, Italian comics artist (continued Yorga, Pecos Bill, Zagor, Tex Willer, Terry, Yado, Il Piccolo Ranger), dies at age 85.
- February 26: André Joy, A.K.A. André Gaudelette (P'tit Joc), dies at age 86.
- February 29: Sheldon Moldoff, American comics artist (worked on Batman), dies at age 91.

=== March ===
- March 5: Joaquim Muntañola, Spanish animator and comics artist (Josechu el Vasco, Angelina y Cristobalito and Doña Exagerancia), dies at age 97.
- March 10: Jean Giraud, aka (Mœbius), French comics artist and writer (Blueberry, Arzach, Airtight Garage, The Incal) and co-founder of the magazine Métal Hurlant, dies at age 73 from cancer.
- March 11:
  - Sid Couchey, American comics artist (worked for Harvey Comics), dies at age 92 from Burkitt's lymphoma.
  - Don Markstein, American comics, cartoons and animation scholar (Don Markstein's Toonopedia) and editor (Comics Revue, co-founder of Apatoons), dies at age 65.
- March 15: Fran Matera, American comics artist (Chuck White, continued Dickie Dare and Steve Roper and Mike Nomad), dies at age 87.

=== April ===
- April 20: Žarko Beker, Croatian comics artist, illustrator and graphic designer (Mak Makić, vitez i četvrt), dies at age 76.
- April 22: Paul Gringle, American comics artist, animator and illustrator (Rural Delivery, worked on Out Of Our Way), dies at age 89.
- April 28: Dik Bruynesteyn, Dutch comics artist and cartoonist (Appie Happie), dies at age 84.
- April 29: Žarko Beker, Croatian comics artist, illustrator and graphic designer (Mak Makić, vitez i četvrt), dies at age 76.

=== May ===
- May 4: Monty Wedd, Australian comic artist and animator (The Scorpion, Captain Justice), dies at age 91.
- May 8:
  - Carlos Loiseau, aka Caloi, Argentine animator and comics artist (Clemente), dies at age 63.
  - Maurice Sendak, American illustrator and comics artist (Where the Wild Things Are), dies at age 83.
- May 11: Tony DeZuniga, Filipino-American comics artist (Jonah Hex, Black Orchid), dies at age 79, following a stroke.
- May 12:
  - Paul Laikin, American editor, comedy writer and comics writer (Mad Magazine, Cracked), dies at age 84.
  - Eddy Paape, Belgian comics artist (Valhardi, Marc Dacier, Luc Orient), dies at age 91.
- May 16: Ernie Chan, Filipino-American comics artist (worked on Batman, Conan the Barbarian), dies at age 71 of cancer.
- May 25: Bert Witte, Dutch comic artist (Bas Toverball, Speez, also drew the celebrity comic based on the TV show Oppassen!), dies at age 68 or 69.
- May 26: Jim Unger, British-Canadian comics artist and cartoonist (Herman), dies at age 75.

=== June ===
- June 5: Ray Bradbury, American novelist and screenwriter, whose stories were frequently adapted into comic book stories by EC Comics with his permission, dies at age 91.
- June 6: Jean-René Le Moing, French comics artist and advertising illustrator (Malabar chewing gum comics, continued L'Oncle Paul), dies at age 73.
- June 7: Robert L. Washington III, American comic book writer (Static, Shadow Cabinet, Extreme Justice), dies from a heart attack at age 47.
- June 16: Jacques Pecnard, French comic artist, painter and illustrator (worked on Le Crime Ne Paie Pas and Les Amours Célèbres), dies at age 89.
- June 20: LeRoy Neiman, American illustrator and comics artist (Playboy, designed the Femlin characters), dies at age 91.
- June 21: Otto Schwalge, German comics artist (Oskar, der freundliche Polizist), dies at age 91.
- June 24: Iwan Lemaire, aka Yvan Lemaire, Belgian comics artist, animator, photographer and painter, dies at age 78.

=== July ===
- July 6: Bart van Erkel, Dutch illustrator, designer and comics artist (De Kat in Katendrecht), dies at age 63.
- July 12: Kenneth Landau, American animator and comic artist (Lucky, worked on the Dragnet newspaper comic, drew horror and romance comics for Lev Gleason and the American Comics Group, drew Hanna-Barbera comics), dies at age 86.
- July 24:
  - R.A. Kosasih, Indonesian comics artist (Sri Asih, Siti Gahara, Sri Dewi), dies at age 93.
  - Themo Lobos, Chilean comics writer and artist (Máximo Chambónez, Ferrilo, Nick Obre, Alaraco, Mampato), dies at age 83.
- July 29: Guus Kool, Dutch comics artist (Mannus, Drs. Katz), dies at age 71.

=== August ===
- August 12: Joe Kubert, American comics artist (Tor, Sgt. Rock, Hawkman, and Tarzan, and founder of The Kubert School, dies at age 85.
- August 15: Harry Harrison, American writer, comics writer (wrote for Flash Gordon) and artist (worked for EC Comics, Fawcett Comics), dies at age 87.
- August 21: Sergio Toppi, Italian comics artist (Il Collezzionista, Sharaz-De), dies at age 79.

=== September ===
- September 5: Martin Filchock, American comics artist (The C.C. Kid, Windy, Check and Double Check, Denny and Diane), dies at age 100.
- September 8: Enrico Bagnoli, A.K.A. Henry, Italian comic artist (Volpe, Nick Carbone, worked on Martin Mystère), dies at age 87.
- September 21: Leopoldo Ortiz Moya, Spanish comic artist (worked for Hombres de Acción), dies at age 82.
- September 30: Pat Mallet, French comics artist (Les Petits Hommes Vertes, Pegg Le Robot, Xing & Xot, Zoum, Nina), dies at age 73.

=== October ===
- October 6: Charlie Kiéfer, French comics artist, dies at age 75.
- October 14:
  - Josep Royo Giménez, Spanish comics artist (El Pintor Pepito), dies at age 90.
  - Marc Swayze, American comics artist (co-creator of Mary Marvel, continued Flyin' Jenny), dies at age 99.
- October 19: John Radford, British comics writer (wrote gag comics for The Beano), dies at age 65.
- October 27: Bill White, American animator and comics artist (Disney comics, Hanna Barbera comics, Kaptain Keen and Kompany), dies at age 51.

=== November ===
- November 2: Gösta Gummesson, Swedish comics artist (Åsa-Nisse), dies at age 84.
- November 13: Ray Zone, American film historian, author and illustrator, best known for making 3-D versions of comics, dies at age 65 from a heart attack.
- November 16: Mario Fantoni, Italian comics artist, dies at age 86.
- November 20: Arnoldo Franchoni, aka Francho, Argentine comics artist (Cándido, Album De Familia, Camotito, Historias De Cinco Guitas, Los Tres Malditos, made comics for Cracked and Mad) dies at age 83 or 84.
- November 28: Spain Rodriguez, American underground comics artist (Trashman), dies at age 72 from cancer.
- November 29: Franco Urru, Italian comics artist, dies at age 53.
- November 30: Jeff Millar, American comics writer (Tank McNamara), dies of bile duct cancer at age 70.
- Specific date unknown: November: Hussein Amin Bikar, Egyptian comics artist and children's book illustrator (Chaddad & Aouad), dies at age 99.

=== December ===
- December 12: Sealtiel Alatriste Batalla, Mexican comics artist (Johnny Galaxie), dies at age 94.
- December 25: Juan Antonio Abellán, Spanish comics artist (Ray Alcotan), dies at age 86.

=== Specific date unknown ===
- Giuseppe Orliani, aka Nino Orlich, Italian comics artist (Cicci), dies at an unknown age.
- Tenas, Belgian comics artist (Morgana, Disney comics, Onkr), dies at age 85 or 86.

== First issues by title ==
Alpha Girl
Release February by Image Comics. Writers: Jean-Paul Bonjour and Jeff Roenning Artist: Robert Love

Avengers: Earth's Mightiest Heroes Adventures
Release April by Marvel Comics. Writer: Chris Yost Artist: Adam Dekraker

Bad Medicine
Release June by Oni Press (also available on FCBD in May 2012). Writers: Christina Weir and Nunzio DeFilippis Artist: Christopher Mitten

Batman Incorporated volume 2
Release May by DC Comics. Writer: Grant Morrison Artist: Chris Burnham

Dark Matter
Release January by Dark Horse Comics. Writers: Joseph Mallozzi, Paul Mullie Artist: Garry Brown

Earth-Two
Release May by DC Comics. Writer: James Robinson Artist: Nicola Scott

Fatale
Release January by Image Comics. Writer: Ed Brubaker Artist: Sean Phillips

Dial H
Release May by DC Comics. Writer: China Miéville Artist: Mateus Santoluoco

G.I. Combat
Release May by DC Comics. Writers: J. T. Krul, Jimmy Palmiotti, Justin Gray Artists: Ariel Olivetti, Dan Panosian, Scott Kolins

Justice League Beyond
Release February by DC Comics. Writer: Derek Fridolfs Artist: Dustin Nguyen

King Conan
Release January by Dark Horse Comics. Writers: Tim Truman Artist: Tomás Giorello

The Manhattan Projects
Release March by Image Comics. Writer: Jonathan Hickman Artist: Nick Pitarra

The Massive
Release June by Dark Horse. Writer: Brian Wood Artist: Kristian Donaldson

MIND MGMT
Release May by Dark Horse. Writer and Artist: Matt Kindt

The New Deadwardians
Release March by Vertigo. Writer: Dan Abnett Artist: I.N.J. Culbard

Planetoid
Release June by Image Comics. Writer & Artist: Ken Garing

Point of Impact
Release October by Image Comics. Writer: Jay Faerber Artist: Koray Kuranel

Rachel Rising
Release March by Abstract Studio. Writer & Artist: Terry Moore

The Ravagers
Release May by DC Comics. Writer: Howard Mackie Artist: Ian Churchill

Resident Alien
Release April by Dark Horse. Writer: Peter Hogan Artist: Steve Parkhouse

Revival
Release May by Image comics. Writer: Tim Seeley Artist: Mike Norton

Saga
Release March by Image Comics. Writer: Brian K. Vaughan Artist: Fiona Staples

Scarlet Spider volume 2
Release January by Marvel Comics. Writer: Chris Yost Artist: Ryan Stegman

Smoke and Mirrors
Release March by IDW Publishing. Writer: Mike Costa Artist: Ryan Brown

Star Wars: Dawn of the Jedi
Release February by Dark Horse Comics. Writer: John Ostrander Artist: Jan Duursema

Thief of Thieves
Release February by Image Comics (Skybound). Writers: Robert Kirkman, Nick Spencer Artist: Shawn Martinbrough

Think Tank
Release August by Image Comics. Writer: Matt Hawkins Artist: Rahsan Ekedal

Ultimate Spider-Man Adventures
Release April by Marvel Comics. Writers: Dan Slott, Ty Templeton Artist: Nuno Plati

Whispers
Release January by Image Comics. Writer and Artist: Joshua Luna

Worlds' Finest
Release May by DC Comics. Writer: Paul Levitz Artist: George Pérez

== See also ==
- List of Oricon number-one manga of 2012
