= Hurricane Katrina in fiction =

Hurricane Katrina has been featured in a number of works of fiction (as well as non-fiction). This article is an ongoing effort to list the many artworks, books, comics, movies, popular songs, and television shows that feature Hurricane Katrina as an event in the plot.

== Books: Fiction, including short story collections ==
Buddy by M.H. Herlong

- Hurricane by Jewell Parker Rhodes
- Down in the Flood by Kenneth Abel
- 'The Floating World by C. Morgan Babst
- ‘’I survived: Hurricane Katrina 2005’’ by Lauren Tarshis
- Nine Lives: Death and Life in New Orleans by Dan Baum
- Revacuation by Brad Benischek
- Blink of an Eye by Rexanne Becnel
- Babylon Rolling by Amanda Boyden
- Jesus Out to Sea by James Lee Burke
- The Tin Roof Blowdown: A Dave Robicheaux Novel by James Lee Burke
- Storm Surge: A Novel of Hurricane Katrina by Ramsey Coutta
- "The Passage" by Justin Cronin
- First The Dead: A Bug Man Novel by Tim Downs
- Tubby Meets Katrina by Tony Dunbar
- Lost and Betrayed (An American Tale): A Fictional Tale of Hurricane Katrina by Sly Fleming
- A Little Bit Ruined by Patty Friedmann
- Taken Away by Patty Friedmann
- Map Of Moments by Christopher Golden and Tim Lebbon
- Darker Angels by MLN Hanover
- All Together Dead by Charlaine Harris
- Murder in the Rue Chartres by Greg Herren
- What Remained of Katrina: A Novel of New Orleans by Kelly Jameson
- Hurricane Katrina--What Really Happened by Nathaniel Jones
- Life in the Wake: Fiction from Post-Katrina New Orleans by the writers of NOLAFugees.com
- City of Refuge by Tom Piazza
- Rooftop Diva: A Novel of Triumph After Katrina by D. T. Pollard
- Misisipi by Michael Reilly
- Ninth Ward by Jewell Parker Rhodes (adolescent literature)
- One D.O.A., One on the Way by Mary Robison
- 1 Dead in Attic by Chris Rose
- "Slab" by Selah Saterstrom
- New Orleans Noir edited by Julie Smith
- Last Known Victim by Erica Spindler
- Voodoo Storm: Hurricane Katrina, Death and Mystery in New Orleans by Davis Temple
- Dogs Gone Wild: After Hurricane Katrina by Theresa D. Thompson
- Hurricane Song by Paul Volponi
- Salvage the Bones by Jesmyn Ward
- Playing the Angel by Kenneth Womack
- Aftermath—Corruption and Intrigue in Post Katrina New Orleans by Charles Williams
- Katrina and the Animals by Taiwo Odunsi

== Books: Non-fiction ==
- Heart Like Water: Surviving Katrina and Life in Its Disaster Zone by Joshua Clark
- Zeitoun by Dave Eggers
- Five Days at Memorial: Life and Death in a Storm-Ravaged Hospital by Sheri Fink
- Pawprints of Katrina by Cathy Scott, foreword by Ali MacGraw, photos by Clay Myers

== Comic books and graphic novels ==
- Bloodthirsty: One Nation Under Water by Mark Landry, Ashley Witter, and Richard Pace
- A.D.: New Orleans After the Deluge by Josh Neufeld
- The Parish: An AmeriCorps Story by Joel E.R. Smith and Ryan Winet

== Films ==
- Bad Lieutenant: Port of Call New Orleans (2009)
- Beasts of the Southern Wild (2012)
- Cut Throat City (2020)
- Déjà Vu (2006)
- Hours (2013)
- Hurricane Season (2009)
- If God Is Willing and Da Creek Don't Rise (2010)
- Low and Behold (2007)
- Streets of Blood (2009)
- The American Can (2011) announced
- The Curious Case of Benjamin Button (2008)
- Trouble the Water (2008)
- Waters Rising (2007), features criminal brothers from the Desire Projects, whose lives are profoundly impacted by Hurricane Katrina and their evacuation to Houston, Texas
- When the Levees Broke: A Requiem in Four Acts (2006)

== Music ==
- "Madman's Dream" by Assemblage 23, from his 2007 album Meta
- "My sanctuary" by Marc Cohn, from his 2007 album Join the Parade
- "Blue Monday" by Alexis Dean (aka Skillbill), is a 2005 song about Katrina
- "This City" by Steve Earle, from his 2011 album I'll Never Get Out of This World Alive
- "Minority Report" by Jay-Z Feat. Ne-Yo, from his 2006 album Kingdom Come
- "The Little Things Give You Away" by Linkin Park, from their 2007 album Minutes to Midnight (album)
- "Nights" by Frank Ocean, from his 2016 album Blonde (Frank Ocean album)
- "New Orleans" by Rancid, from their 2009 album Let The Dominoes Fall
- "We Stay Behind" by Rasputina, from their 2007 album Oh Perilous World
- "God Forsaken Town" by Reckless Kelly, from their 2008 album Bulletproof
- The first verse of "Help is on the Way" by Rise Against, from their 2011 album Endgame
- "Pontchartrain" by Vienna Teng, from her 2006 album Dreaming Through the Noise
- "O Katrina!" by The Black Lips, from their 2007 album Good Bad Not Evil

== Television series ==
- American Crime Story, FX (Season 3)
- Bones, FOX (2006) (Season 1, Episode 19) ("The Man in the Morgue")
- The Boondocks, Adult Swim (2007) (Season 2, Episode 9) ("The Invasion of the Katrinas")
- Boston Legal, ABC (Season 3, Episode 11)
- Cloak & Dagger, Freeform (Flashbacks)
- Criminal Minds (TV Series), CBS (Season 2, Episode 18)
- K-Ville, FOX (2007)
- NCIS New Orleans, CBS (Flashback)
- The Naked Brothers Band (TV series), Nickelodeon (Season 2, Episodes 26–28) ("Polar Bears")
- Treme, HBO (2010–2013)
- Without a Trace, CBS (Season 5, Episode 6)
- Reba, UPN (Season 5, Episode 5) ("No Good Deed")

== Theater ==
The Hurricane Katrina Comedy Festival, by Rob Florence, premiered at the 2010 New York International Fringe Festival at SoHo Playhouse. The cast, directed by Dann Fink and stage managed by Christina Lowe, featured Philip Hoffman, Lizann Mitchell, Maureen Silliman, Evander Duck, and Gary Cowling. The play interweaves the stories of five individuals in New Orleans during and after Hurricane Katrina. According to Time Out New York, the play focuses "on the kind of small anecdotes you might hear from a friend in your living room: politely amusing, occasionally moving, deliberately uplifting." The New York Times' David Rooney compared the play's narrative approach to The Laramie Project, with the story told by each character "intertwined into a compelling chronicle, The show extended, and was included in the New York International Fringe Festival's Encores Series, remounted at the Lucille Lortel Theatre with the original cast, director and designers reprising their roles.

== Art ==
- Katrina (2005), by Rashit Suleymanov, Bronze
- Floodwall (2005), by Jana Napoli, installation
