= List of limited series =

In comic books (primarily American comic books), a limited series is a title given to a comic book series that is intended from the outset to have a finite length.

Each list is defined by publisher and the length by which each series ran. For the purposes of the lists, a limited series is defined as being one for which the publisher had announced the final issue number prior to or on the publication of the first issue.

== Two to three issues ==
=== Published by DC Comics ===
- Adam Strange, 1990 (3 issues)
- Armageddon 2001, 1991 (2 issues)
- Batman: The Dark Knight Strikes Again, 2001-2002 (3 issues)
- Batman: Gotham County Line, 2005 (3 issues)
- Batman/Lobo, 2007 (2 issues)
- Batman: Outlaws, 2000 (3 issues)
- Batman: Run, Riddler, Run, 1992 (3 issues)
- Batman: Tenses, 2003 (2 issues)
- Batman: Two-Face Strikes Twice, 1993 (2 issues)
- Batman/Wildcat, 1997 (3 issues)
- Blackhawk, 1988 (3 issues)
- Black Orchid, 1988-1989 (3 issues)
- Bugs Bunny, 1990 (3 issues)
- Bugs Bunny Monthly, 1994 (3 issues)
- Captain Carrot and His Amazing Zoo-Crew: The Oz-Wonderland War, 1986 (3 issues)
- Captain Carrot and the Final Ark, 2007 (3 issues)
- Clash, 1991 (3 issues)
- Convergence: Crime Syndicate, 2015 (2 issues)
- Convergence: Green Lantern / Parallax, 2015 (2 issues)
- Convergence: Green Lantern Corps, 2015 (2 issues)
- Convergence: Harley Quinn, 2015 (2 issues)
- Convergence: The Flash, 2015 (2 issues)
- Convergence: The Question, 2015 (2 issues)
- Deadman: Love After Death, 1989-1990 (2 issues)
- Deadman: Dark Mansion of Forbidden Love, 2017 (3 issues)
- Doctor Mid-Nite, 1999 (3 issues)
- Green Arrow: The Longbow Hunters, 1987 (3 issues)
- Green Lantern/Green Arrow, 1983 (3 issues, reprinting 6 classic GL Issues from 1970)
- Green Lantern/Sentinel: Heart of Darkness, 1998 (3 issues)
- Green Lantern: Circle of Fire, 2000 (2 issues)
- Green Lantern: Dragon Lord, 2001 (3 issues)
- Guy Gardner: Reborn, 1992 (3 issues)
- Hawkworld, DC Comics, 1989 (3 issues)
- History of the DC Universe, 1986 (2 issues)
- The Immortal Dr. Fate, 1985 (3 issues)
- Invasion!, 1988-1989 (3 issues)
- JLA-Z, 2003 - 2004 (3 issues)
- JLA/Hitman, 2007 (2 issues)
- Justice, Inc., 1989 (2 issues)
- Kid Eternity, 1991 (3 issues)
- The Kingdom, 1999 (2 issues)
- Superman Presents: Krypton Chronicles, 1981 (3 issues)
- Legends of the Worlds Finest, 1994 (3 issues)
- Lois Lane, 1986 (2 issues)
- Martian Manhunter: American Secrets, 1992 (3 issues)
- Masters of the Universe, 1982-1983 (3 issues)
- ¡Mucha Lucha!, 2003 (3 issues)
- The Multiversity, 2014-2015 (2 issues)
- Power Lords, 1983-1984 (3 issues)
- Robin 3000, 1993 (2 issues)
- Robotech Defenders, 1985 (2 issues)
- Sebastian O, 1993 (3 issues)
- Secrets of the Legion of Super-Heroes, 1981 (3 issues)
- Skull & Bones, 1992 (3 issues)
- Streets, 1993 (3 issues)
- Tales of the Green Lantern Corps, 1981 (3 issues)
- Trinity (also Batman-Superman-Wonder Woman: Trinity), 2004 (3 issues)
- Twilight, 1990-1991 (3 issues)
- The Untold Legend of the Batman, 1980 (3 issues)
- Who's Who in Star Trek, 1987 (2 issues)
- World of Krypton, 1979 (3 issues)
- World's Finest, 1990 (3 issues)
- Year One: Batman/Ra's Al Ghul, 2005 (2 issues)
- Year One: Batman/Scarecrow, 2005 (2 issues)

==== Black Label imprint ====
- Batman: Damned, 2018 (3 issues)

==== Elseworlds titles ====
- Batgirl and Robin: Thrillkiller, (3 issues)
- Batman: The Book of the Dead, 1999 (2 issues)
- Batman: League of Batmen, 2001 (2 issues)
- Batman: Dark Knight of the Round Table, 1998 (2 issues)
- Batman: The Doom That Came to Gotham, 2000 (3 issues)
- Batman: Hollywood Knight, 2001 (3 issues)
- Batman: Manbat, 1995 (3 issues)
- Catwoman: Guardian of Gotham, 1999 (2 issues)
- Conjurors (3 issues)
- Elseworld's Finest
- Flashpoint, 1999 (3 issues)
- Green Lantern: Evil's Might, 2002 (3 issues)
- Justice League: Act of God, 2000-2001 (3 issues)
- JLA: Age Of Wonder, 2003 (2 issues)
- JLA: Created Equal, 2000 (2 issues)
- JLA: The Nail, 1998 (3 issues)
- JLA: Another Nail, 2004 (3 issues)
- JLA: The Secret Society of Super-Heroes, 2000 (2 issues)
- League of Justice, 1996 (2 issues)
- Robin 3000, 1992 (2 issues)
- Superman: Last Son of Earth, 2000 (2 issues)
- Superman: Red Son, 2003 (3 issues)
- Superman/Tarzan: Sons of the Jungle, 2001 (3 issues)

==== Johnny DC imprint ====
- Hi Hi Puffy Amiyumi, 2006 (3 issues)

==== Vertigo imprint ====
- Adventures in the Rifle Brigade, DC Comics (Vertigo), 2000 (3 issues)
- Adventures in the Rifle Brigade: Operation Bollock, DC Comics (Vertigo), 2001 (3 issues)
- Jonah Hex: Shadows West, DC Comics (Vertigo), 1999 (3 issues)

=== Published by Image Comics ===
- Angela, Image Comics, 1994-1995 (3 issues)
- City of Silence, Image Comics, 2000 (3 issues)
- Mayhem!, Image Comics, 2009 (3 issues)
- Ministry of Space, Image Comics, 2001 (3 issues)
- Pretty, Baby, Machine, Image Comics, 2008 (3 issues)
- Splitting Image, Image Comics, 1993 (2 issues)
- Ward of the State, Image Comics, 2007 (3 issues)

=== Published by Marvel Comics ===
- Abominations, Marvel Comics, 1996 (3 issues)
- Avataars: Covenant of the Shield, Marvel Comics, 2000 (3 issues)
- Beast, Marvel Comics, 1997 (3 issues)
- Before the Fantastic Four: Reed Richards, Marvel Comics, 2000 (3 issues)
- Beta Ray Bill: Godhunter, Marvel Comics, 2009 (3 issues)
- Blood and Glory, Marvel Comics, 1992 (3 issues)
- Contest of Champions, Marvel Comics Group, 1982 (3 issues)
- Daily Bugle, Marvel Comics 1996-1997 (3 issues)
- Daredevil: Ninja, Marvel Comics, 2000-2001 (3 issues)
- Dark Reign: Lethal Legion, Marvel Comics, 2009 (3 issues)
- Dark Reign: Mr. Negative, Marvel Comics 2009 (3 issues)
- Machine Man 2020, Marvel Comics, 1994 (2 issues)
- The Punisher: Origin of Microchip, Marvel Comics, 1993 (2 issues)
- The Punisher: Ghost of Innocents, Marvel Comics, 1993 (2 issues)
- Red Sonja, Marvel Comics, 1983 (2 issues)
- Red Sonja, Marvel Comics, 1985 (2 issues)
- Secret Invasion: Amazing Spider-Man Marvel Comics, 2008 (3 issues)
- Secret Invasion: Fantastic Four Marvel Comics, 2008 (3 issues)
- Secret Invasion: Runaways/Young Avengers, Marvel Comics, 2008 (3 issues)
- Secret Invasion: Thor, Marvel Comics, 2008 (3 issues)
- Spider-Man: Death & Destiny Marvel Comics, 2000 (3 issues)
- Spider-Man: Funeral For an Octopus Marvel Comics, 1995 (3 issues)
- Spider-Man: Hobgoblin Lives Marvel Comics, 1997 (3 issues)
- Spider-Man: Lifeline Marvel Comics, 2001 (3 issues)
- Spider-Man: Revenge of the Green Goblin Marvel Comics, 2000 (3 issues)
- Spider-Man: Shadow Games Marvel Comics, 1994 (3 issues)
- Spider-Man: The Mysterio Manifesto Marvel Comics, 2001 (3 issues)
- Spider-Man/The Punisher: Family Plot, Marvel Comics, 1996 (2 issues)
- Spider-Man: The Lost Years, Marvel Comics, 1995 (3 issues)
- Spider-Man: Web of Doom, Marvel Comics, 1994 (3 issues)
- The Thanos Quest, Marvel Comics, 1990 (2 issues)
- Wolverine: Days of Future Past, Marvel Comics, 1997-98 (3 issues)
- Wolverine/Punisher: Damaging Evidence, Marvel Comics, 1993 (3 issues)
- Wolverine/Black Cat: Claws, Marvel Comics, 2006 (3 issues)
- World War Hulks: Spider-Man Vs. Thor, Marvel Comics, 2010 (2 issues)
- X-Men: Curse of the Mutants - X-Men Vs. Vampires, Marvel Comics 2010 (2 issues)

==== Ultimate imprint ====
- Ultimate X4, Marvel Comics, 2005–2006 (2 issues)

=== Other publishers ===
- April O'Neil, Archie Comics, 1993 (3 issues)
- April O'Neil: The May East Saga, Archie Comics, 1993 (3 issues)
- Batman versus Predator, DC Comics and Dark Horse Comics, 1991-1992 (3 issues)
- Darkwing Duck Limited Series (Disney Comics)
- Dinosaurs, Disney Comics, 1993 (2 issues)
- Donatello and Leatherhead, Archie Comics, 1993 (3 issues)
- Futurama/Simpsons Special Infinitely Secret Crossover Crisis, Bongo Comics, 2002 (2 issues)
- Princess Sally, Archie Comics, 1995 (3 issues)
- Tale Spin Limited Series (Disney Comics)
- The Junior Woodchucks (Disney Comics)
- The Little Mermaid (Disney Comics)
- The New Adventures of Beauty and The Beast (Disney Comics)
- The Return of Aladdin, Disney Comics, 1993 (2 issues)
- Serenity: Those Left Behind, Dark Horse Comics, 2005 (3 issues)
- Shrek, Dark Horse Comics, 2003 (3 issues)
- The Simpsons/Futurama Crossover Crisis II, Bongo Comics, 2005 (2 issues)
- Sonic's Friendly Nemesis Knuckles, Archie Comics, 1996 (3 issues)
- Sonic Quest: The Death Egg Saga, Archie Comics, 1996 (3 issues)
- Star Trek: Deep Space Nine Marquis, Malibu, 1995
- Street Fighter, Malibu Comics, 1994 (3 issues)
- Tails, Archie Comics, 1995 (3 issues)
- Teenage Mutant Ninja Turtles Adventures, Archie Comics, 1988 (3 issues)
- Teenage Mutant Ninja Turtles Adventures: The Year of the Turtle, Archie Comics, 1996 (3 issues)
- Whiteout: Melt, Oni Press, 2001 (3 issues)

== Four issues ==
=== Published by CrossGen Comics ===
- Chimera, 2003

=== Published by DC Comics ===
- A. Bizarro, 1999
- Ambush Bug, 1985
- Amethyst: The Legend Reborn, 1987-1988
- America vs. the Justice Society, 1985
- Angel and the Ape (vol. 2), 1991
- Aquaman (vol. 2), 1986
- Aquaman: Time and Tide, 1993
- Armageddon: The Alien Agenda, 1991-1992
- Armageddon: Inferno, 1992
- Batman: The Dark Knight Returns, 1986
- Batman: Black & White, 1996
- Batman: Bane of the Demon, 1998
- Batman: The Cult, 1988
- Batman: The Dark Knight Strikes Again, 2001-2002
- Batman: GCPD, 1996
- Batman: Gordon of Gotham, 1998
- Batman: Gordon's Law, 1996
- Batman: Gotham Nights, 1992
- Batman: Gotham Nights II, 1995
- Batman: Sword of Azrael, 1992-1993
- Batman: Year One, 1987 (limited series within the Batman ongoing series)
- Batman: Year 100, 2006
- Beast Boy, 1999
- Black Canary (vol. 1), 1991-1992
- Black Canary (vol.. 3), 2007
- Bloodpack, 1995
- The Books of Magic, 1990-1991
- Breathtaker, 1990
- Catwoman, 1989
- Centurions, 1987
- Cinder & Ash, 1988
- Congorilla, 1992-1993
- Conqueror of the Barren Earth, 1985
- Cosmic Boy, 1986-1987
- Cosmic Odyssey, 1987
- The Crimson Avenger, 1988
- Danger Trail, 1993
- Deadman (vol. 2), 1986
- Deadshot, 1988
- The Demon, 1987
- Doc Savage, 1987
- Doctor Fate, 1987
- Elfquest: The Discovery, 2006
- Elongated Man, 1992
- Gilgamesh II, 1989
- The Golden Age, 1993
- Green Arrow, 1983
- Green Arrow: The Wonder Year, 1993
- Jack Cross, 2005-2006
- Jonni Thunder, 1985
- The Legend of Wonder Woman, 1986
- Legionnaires 3, 1986
- Lobo, 1990-1991
- Lobo: On Contract on Gawd, 1994
- Lobo: Death and Taxes, 1996-1997
- MASK, 1985
- Martian Manhunter, 1988
- Metal Men, 1993-1994
- Mister E, 1991
- Nathaniel Dusk, 1984
- Nathaniel Dusk II, 1985-1986
- The Nazz, 1990-1991
- Nightwing, 1995 (spawned the ongoing series)
- Nightwing/Huntress, 1998
- OMAC (vol. 2), 1991
- Peacemaker, 1988
- The Phantom, 1988
- The Phantom Stranger, 1987
- The Phantom Zone, 1982
- Plastic Man, 1988-1989
- Power Girl, 1988
- The Prisoner, 1988-1989
- Red Tornado (vol. 1), 1985
- Ring of the Nibelung, 1989-1990
- Robin II, 1991
- Robin: Year One, 2001
- The Saga of Ra's al Ghul, 1988
- Scene of the Crime, 1999
- The Shade, 1997
- The Shadow, 1986
- The Shadow War of Hawkman, 1985
- Shazam!: The Monster Society of Evil, 2007
- Shazam!: The New Beginning, 1987
- Spiral Zone, 1988
- Star Trek - The Modala Imperative, 1991
- Star Trek: The Next Generation - Ill Wind, 1995–96
- Supergirl, 1994
- Superman & Batman: Generations, 1999
- Superman & Batman: Generations II, 2003
- Superman & Bugs Bunny, 2000
- Superman For All Seasons, 1999
- Superman: Secret Identity, 2004
- Superman: The Secret Years, 1985
- Superman/Shazam: First Thunder, 2005–2006
- Sword of the Atom, 1983
- Tales of The New Teen Titans, 1982
- Tempus Fugitive, 1990-1991
- Underworld, 1987-1988
- War of the Gods, 1991
- The Weird, 1988
- Who's Who: Update '88, 1988
- Wild Dog, 1987
- The World of Krypton, 1987
- The World of Metropolis, 1988
- The World of Smallville, 1988
- Wrath of the Spectre, 1988

==== Elseworlds imprint ====
- Batman: Haunted Gotham, 1999–2000
- The Golden Age, 1993
- JLA: Destiny, 2002
- Kingdom Come, 1996
- Superman/Wonder Woman: Whom Gods Destroy, 1997

==== Vertigo imprint ====
- Sandman Presents: Thessaly, Witch for Hire, DC Comics (Vertigo), 2004
- Unknown Soldier (vol. 3), DC Comics (Vertigo), 1997

==== Wildstorm imprint ====
- Danger Girl: Back in Black, 2005–2006
- Red Sonja/Claw the Unconquered: Devil's Hands, 2006
- Legend, 2005

=== Published by Image Comics ===
- Drums, Image Comics, 2011 (4 issues)
- Fearless, Image Comics, 2007 (4 issues)
- Intimidators, Image Comics, 2005 (4 issues)
- The Milkman Murders, Image Comics, 2004 (4 issues)
- Occult Crimes Taskforce, Image Comics, 2006 (4 issues)
- Pax Romana, Image Comics, 2007 (4 issues)
- Point of Impact, Image Comics, 2012 (4 issues)
- Spawn/WildC.A.T.S., Image Comics, 1996 (4 issues)
- The Tenth, Image Comics, 1997 (4 issues)
- Undying Love, Image Comics, 2011 (4 issues)
- XXXombies, Image Comics, 2007 (4 issues)

=== Published by Marvel Comics ===
- Age of Heroes, Marvel Comics, 2010
- Annihilation: Nova, Marvel Comics, 2006
- Annihilation: Ronan, Marvel Comics, 2006
- Annihilation: Silver Surfer, Marvel Comics, 2006
- Annihilation: Super-Skrull, Marvel Comics, 2006
- Annihilation: Conquest - Quasar, Marvel Comics, 2007
- Annihilation: Conquest - Starlord, Marvel Comics, 2007
- Annihilation: Conquest - Wraith, Marvel Comics, 2007
- Apache Skies, Marvel Comics, 2002
- Avengers and Power Pack Assemble, Marvel Comics, 2006
- Black Panther, Marvel, 1988
- Blaze of Glory, Marvel Comics, 2000
- Cloak and Dagger: The Light and the Darkness, Marvel Comics, 1983
- Ultimate Daredevil and Elektra, 2002
- Deadpool: Circle Chase, Marvel Comics, 1993
- Elektra: Glimpse & Echo, 2002
- Elektra Saga, Marvel Comics, 1983
- Falcon, Marvel Comics, 1983
- Fantastic Four vs. The X-Men, Marvel Comics, 1987
- Fantastic Four/Iron Man, Marvel Comics, 2005–06
- Felicia Hardy: The Black Cat, Marvel Comics, 1994
- G.I. Joe and the Transformers, Marvel Comics, 1987
- Hawkeye, Marvel Comics Group, 1983
- Hercules: Prince Of Power, Marvel Comics Group, 1982
- Hercules, Marvel Comics Group, 1983
- Iceman, Marvel Comics, 1984
- Infinity: Heist, Marvel Comics, 2013-2014
- Iron Man: Bad Blood, Marvel Comics, 2000
- Jack of Hearts, Marvel Comics, 1983-4
- Machine Man, Marvel Comics, 1984–85
- Magik (Illyana and Storm), Marvel Comics, 1983-1984
- Magneto: Not a Hero, Marvel Comics, 2011-2012
- Mary Jane, Marvel Comics, 2004
- Mary Jane: Homecoming, Marvel Comics, 2005
- Marvels, Marvel Comics, 1994
- Mort the Dead Teenager, Marvel Comics, 1993-1994
- Nightcrawler, Marvel Comics, 1985
- The Punisher: Born, Marvel Comics, 2003
- The Punisher P.O.V, Marvel Comics, 1991
- The Punisher: Year One, Marvel Comics, 1994
- Rocket Raccoon, Marvel Comics, 1985
- Saga of the Original Human Torch, Marvel Comics, 1990
- Sabretooth, Marvel Comics, 1993
- The Deadly Foes of Spider-Man, Marvel Comics, 1991
- The Lethal Foes of Spider-Man, Marvel Comics, 1993
- Spider-Man: The Final Adventure, Marvel Comics, 1995-1996
- Spider-Man: Redemption, Marvel Comics, 1996
- Spider-Man/Daredevil, Marvel Comics, 2001
- Spider-Man: Quality of Life, Marvel Comics, 2002
- Spider-Man: Doctor Octopus-Year One, Marvel Comics, 2004
- Star Wars: Captain Phasma, Marvel Comics, 2017
- Star Wars: Shattered Empire, Marvel Comics, 2015
- Starriors, Marvel Comics, 1984–85
- Venom: Separation Anxiety, Marvel Comics, 1994-1995
- Vision And The Scarlet Witch, Marvel Comics Group, 1982
- West Coast Avengers, Marvel Comics, 1984
- Wolverine, Marvel Comics, 1982
- X-Men vs. The Avengers, Marvel Comics, 1987
- X-Terminators, Marvel Comics, 1988

==== Marvel Knights ====
- The Punisher: Purgatory, Marvel Comics, 1998-1999
- Spider-Man/Wolverine, Marvel Comics, 2003
- Daredevil/Spider-Man, Marvel Comics, 2000

==== Ultimate imprint ====
- Ultimate War, Marvel Comics, 2002-2003
- Ultimate Secret, Marvel Comics, 2005

=== Other publishers ===
- Aliens vs. Predator vs. the Terminator, Dark Horse Comics, 2000
- Darkwing Duck, Disney Comics, 1991
- Fort: Prophet of the Unexplained, Dark Horse Comics, 2002
- Give Me Liberty, Dark Horse Comics, 1990
- Junior Woodchucks, Disney Comics, 1991
- The Little Mermaid, Disney Comics, 1992
- Resident Alien, Dark Horse Comics, 2012
- RoboCop vs. Terminator, Dark Horse Comics, 1992
- Sonic the Hedgehog, Archie Comics, 1993
- Spider-Man: India, Gotham Entertainment Group, 2004
- Star Trek: Countdown, IDW, 2009
- Star Trek: Deep Space Nine - N-Vector, WildStorm, 2000
- Star Trek: Deep Space Nine - Hearts and Minds, Malibu, 1994
- Star Trek: Divided We Fall, WildStorm, 2001
- Star Trek: The Next Generation - Perchance to Dream, WildStorm, 2000
- TaleSpin, Disney Comics, 1990–91
- Terminator Vol. 1, Dark Horse Comics, 1990
- Terminator Vol. 2, Dark Horse Comics, 1998
- The Last of Us: American Dreams, Dark Horse Comics, 2013
- Whiteout, Oni Press, 1998

== Five to six issues ==
=== Published by CrossGen Comics ===
- Mark of Charon, 2003 (5 Issues)
- The Silken Ghost, 2003 (5 Issues)

=== Published by DC Comics ===
- Aquaman (vol. 3), 1989
- Arkham Asylum: Living Hell, DC Comics, 2003 (6 issues)
- Bat Lash, DC Comics, 2008 (6 issues)
- Batman '66 meets Wonder Woman '77, DC Comics, 2017 (6 issues)
- Batman: Dark Detective, DC Comics, 2005 (6 issues)
- Batman: Jekyll and Hyde, DC Comics, 2005 (6 issues)
- Batman: Orpheus Rising, DC Comics, 2001 (5 issues)
- Batman: Secrets, DC Comics, 2006 (5 issues)
- Batman: Turning Points, DC Comics, January 2001 (5 issues)
- The Batman Adventures: The Lost Years, DC Comics, 1997-98 (5 issues)
- Batman and the Mad Monk, DC Comics, 2006-2007 (6 issues)
- Batman and the Monster Men, DC Comics, 2005–2006 (6 issues)
- Batman-Huntress: Cry for Blood, DC Comics, 2000 (6 issues)
- Best of the Brave and the Bold, DC Comics, 1988-1989 (6 issues)
- The Brave and the Bold (vol. 2), DC Comics, 1991-1992 (6 issues)
- The Butcher, DC Comics, 1990 (5 issues)
- Catwoman: When in Rome, DC Comics, 2004-2005 (6 issues)
- Connor Hawke: Dragon's Blood, DC Comics, 2006-2007 (6 issues)
- The Creeper, DC Comics, 2006-2007 (6 issues)
- Crisis Aftermath: The Battle for Blüdhaven, DC Comics, 2006 (6 Issues)
- DC: The New Frontier, DC Comics, 2004 (6 issues)
- Deadman (Vol. 5), DC Comics, 2018 (6 issues)
- The Demon: Hell is Earth, DC Comics, 2018 (6 issues)
- Fanboy, DC Comics, 1999 (6 issues)
- Flash/Green Lantern: The Brave and the Bold, DC Comics, 1999–2000 (6 issues)
- Forever People (vol. 2), DC Comics, 1988 (6 issues)
- Green Arrow: Year One, DC Comics, 2007 (6 issues)
- Green Lantern: Emerald Dawn, DC Comics, 1989-1990 (6 issues)
- Green Lantern: Emerald Dawn II - 90 Days, DC Comics, 1991 (6 issues)
- Green Lantern: Lost Army, DC Comics, 2015-2016 (6 issues)
- Green Lantern: Rebirth, DC Comics, 2004-2005 (6 issues)
- Green Lantern Corps: Edge of Oblivion, DC Comics, 2016 (6 issues)
- Green Lantern Corps: Recharge, DC Comics, 2005–2006 (5 issues)
- The Griffin, DC Comics, 1991 (6 issues)
- Harley Quinn & Her Gang of Harleys, DC Comics, 2016 (6 issues)
- Harley Quinn & Power Girl, DC Comics, 2015-2016 (6 issues)
- Harley's Little Black Book, DC Comics, 2016-2017 (6 issues)
- Hawk and Dove (vol. 2), DC Comics, 1988-1989 (5 issues)
- Hero Hotline, DC Comics, 1989 (6 issues)
- Infinite Crisis tie-in limited series:
  - Day of Vengeance, DC Comics, 2005 (6 issues)
  - The OMAC Project, DC Comics, 2005 (6 issues)
  - Rann-Thanagar War, DC Comics, 2005 (6 issues)
  - Villains United, DC Comics, 2005 (6 issues)
- Knight and Squire, DC Comics, 2010-2011 (6 issues)
- Krypto the Superdog, DC Comics, 2006-2007 (6 issues)
- Legends, DC Comics, 1986 (6 issues)
- Legion: Secret Origin, DC Comics, 2012 (6 issues)
- Lex Luthor: Man of Steel, DC Comics, 2005 (6 issues)
- Lords of the Ultra-Realm, DC Comics, 1986 (6 issues)
- The Man of Steel (or Superman: The Man of Steel), DC Comics, 1986 (6 issues)
- New Gods (vol. 2), DC Comics, 1984 (6 issues)
- The Next, DC Comics, 2006-2007 (6 issues)
- The Omega Men, DC Comics, 2006-2007 (6 issues)
- The Penguin: Pain and Prejudice, DC Comics, 2011-2012 (5 issues)
- Poison Ivy: Cycle of Life and Death, DC Comics, 2016 (6 issues)
- Prez, DC Comics, 2015-2016 (6 issue)
- The Question, DC Comics, 2005 (6 issues)
- Ragman: Cry of the Dead, DC Comics, 1993-1994 (6 issues)
- Ragman (Vol. 3), DC Comics, 2017-2018 (6 issues)
- The Ray, DC Comics, 1992 (6 issues)
- Red Tornado (Vol. 2), DC Comics, 2009-2010 (6 issues)
- Robin, DC Comics, 1991 (5 issues)
- Robin III, DC Comics, 1992-1993 (6 issues)
- Ronin, DC Comics, 1983-1984 (6 issues)
- Roots of the Swamp Thing, DC Comics, 1986 (5 issues)
- Rush City, DC Comics, 2006-2007 (6 issues)
- Secret Six, DC Comics, 2006 (6 issues)
- Sgt. Rock: The Prophecy, DC Comics, 2006 (6 issues)
- Shadow of the Batman, DC Comics, 1985 (5 issues)
- Slash Maraud, DC Comics, 1987-88 (6 issues)
- Son of Ambush Bug, DC Comics, 1986 (6 issues)
- Son of Vulcan, DC Comics, 2005 (6 issues)
- Space Ghost, DC Comics, 2005 (6 issues)
- Spanner's Galaxy, DC Comics, 1984-1985 (6 issues)
- Star Trek: The Next Generation, DC Comics, 1988 (6 issues)
- Supergirl: Cosmic Adventures in the Eighth Grade, 2009 (6 issues)
- Superman/Supergirl: Maelstrom, 2008–09 (5 issues)
- Super Powers (Vol. 1) DC Comics, 1984 (5 issues)
- Super Powers (Vol. 2), DC Comics, 1985-1986 (6 issues)
- Super Powers (Vol. 3), DC Comics, 1986 (6 issues)
- Tailgunner Jo, DC Comics, 1988-1989 (6 issues)
- Time Masters: Vanishing Point, DC Comics, 2010-2011 (6 issues)
- Vigilante, DC Comics, 2005–2006 (6 issues)
- Who's Who: Update '87, DC Comics, 1987 (5 issues)
- Wonder Girl, DC Comics, 2007-2008 (6 issues)
- World Without End, DC Comics, 1990-1991 (6 issues)

==== Elseworlds imprint ====
- Batman: Nevermore, DC Comics (Elseworlds), 2003 (5 issues)
- JSA, The Liberty Files: The Whistling Skull, DC Comics (Elseworlds), 2013 (6 issues)
- Kamandi: At Earth's End, DC Comics (Elseworlds), 1993 (6 issues)

==== Johnny DC imprint ====
- Krypto the Superdog, DC Comics (Johnny DC), 2006 (6 issues)

==== Vertigo imprint ====
- Jonah Hex: Riders of the Worm and Such, DC Comics (Vertigo), 1995 (5 issues)
- Jonah Hex: Two-Gun Mojo, DC Comics (Vertigo), 1993 (5 issues)
- John Constantine-Hellblazer Special: Papa Midnight, DC Comics (Vertigo), 2005 (5 issues)
- Sandman: Overture, DC Comics (Vertigo), 2015-2016 (6 issues)

==== Wildstorm imprint ====
- Albion, DC Comics (Wildstorm), 2005–2006 (6 issues)
- Arrowsmith, DC Comics (Wildstorm/Cliffhanger), 2003 (6 issues)
- City of Tomorrow, DC Comics (Wildstorm), 2005 (6 issues)
- Jenny Sparks: The Secret History of the Authority, DC Comics (Wildstorm), 2000 (5 issues)
- The League of Extraordinary Gentlemen, DC Comics (Wildstorm), 1998-1999 (6 issues)
- The League of Extraordinary Gentlemen II, DC Comics (Wildstorm), 2003-2004 (6 issues)
- Robotech: Prelude to the Shadow Chronicles, DC Comics (Wildstorm), 2005–2006 (5 issues)
- Team Zero, DC Comics (Wildstorm), 2005–2006 (6 issues)
- Thunderbolt Jaxon, DC Comics (Wildstorm), 2006 (5 issues)
- Greyshirt: Indigo Sunset, DC Comics (Wildstorm), 2001-2002 (6 issues)
- Wraithborn, DC Comics (Wildstorm), 2005–2006 (6 issues)

==== Young Animals imprint ====
- Bug!: The Adventures of Forager, DC Comics (DC Young Animals), 2017-2018 (6 issues)

=== Published by Image Comics ===
- Alpha Girl, Image Comics, 2012 (5 issues)

=== Published by Marvel Comics ===
- 1602: New World, Marvel Comics, 2005 (5 issues)
- Ares, 2006
- Astonishing Thor, 2011 (5 issues)
- Beyond!, Marvel Comics, 2006 (6 issues)
- Battle Scars, Marvel Comics, 2011-2012 (6 issues)
- Captain Marvel, Marvel Comics, 1995-1996 (6 issues)
- Contest of Champions II, Marvel Comics, 1999 (5 issues)
- Daredevil: The Man Without Fear, Marvel Comics, 1993-1994 (5 issues)
- Daredevil: Yellow, Marvel Comics, 2001-2002 (6 issues)
- Daredevil: Father, Marvel Comics, 2004-2006 (5 issues)
- Daredevil: Redemption, Marvel Comics, 2005-2005 (6 issues)
- Dark Reign: Elektra, Marvel Comics, 2009 (5 issues)
- Dark Reign: Fantastic Four, Marvel Comics, 2009 (5 issues)
- Dark Reign: Hawkeye, Marvel Comics, 2009 (5 issues)
- Fantastic Four: The End, Marvel Comics, 2006-2007 (6 issues)
- Hulk: Grey, Marvel Comics, 2002 (6 issues)
- Hulk Smash Avengers, 2012 (5 issues)
- Infinity Abyss, Marvel Comics, 2002 (6 issues)
- Infinity Crusade, Marvel Comics, 1993 (6 issues)
- The Infinity Gauntlet, Marvel Comics, 1990 (6 issues)
- Infinity War, Marvel Comics, 1992 (6 issues)
- Kitty Pryde and Wolverine, Marvel Comics, 1984-1985 (6 issues)
- Longshot, Marvel Comics, 1985 (6 issues)
- The Punisher, Marvel Comics, 1986 (5 issues)
- Punisher vs. Bullseye, Marvel Comics, year unknown (5 issues)
- Spellbound, Marvel Comics, 1988 (6 issues)
- Spider-Man: Blue, Marvel Comics, 2002 (6 issues)
- Spider-Man: Get Kraven, Marvel Comics, 2002 (6 issues)
- Spider-Man: Breakout, Marvel Comics, 2005 (5 issues)
- Spider-Man: House of M, Marvel Comics, 2005 (5 issues)
- Spider-Man: The Arachnis Project, Marvel Comics, 1993 (6 issues)
- Spider-Man/Black Cat: The Evil That Men Do, Marvel Comics, 2002-2006 (6 issues)
- Spider-Man/Red Sonja, Marvel Comics, 2007-2008 (5 issues)
- Venom: Sinner Takes All, Marvel Comics, 1995 (5 issues)
- World War Hulk, Marvel Comics, 2007 (5 issues)
- Spider-Men, Marvel Comics, 2012 (5 issues)
- Star Wars: Chewbacca, Marvel Comics, 2015 (5 issues)
- Star Wars: Darth Maul, Marvel Comics, 2017 (5 issues)
- Star Wars: Han Solo, Marvel Comics, 2016 (5 issues)
- Star Wars: Jedi of the Republic – Mace Windu, Marvel Comics, 2017 (5 issues)
- Star Wars: Lando, Marvel Comics, 2015 (5 issues)
- Star Wars: Obi-Wan and Anakin, Marvel Comics, 2016 (5 issues)
- Star Wars: Princess Leia, Marvel Comics, 2015 (5 issues)
- Star Wars: Rogue One Adaptation, Marvel Comics, 2017 (6 issues)
- Star Wars: The Force Awakens Adaptation, Marvel Comics, 2016 (6 issues)
- Star Wars: Thrawn, Marvel Comics, 2018 (6 issues)

==== Marvel Knights ====
- Wolverine/Punisher, Marvel Comics (Marvel Knights), year unknown (5 issues)
- Daredevil vs. The Punisher: Means and Ends, Marvel Comics (Marvel Knights), year unknown (6 issues)
- Ghost Rider, Marvel Comics (Marvel Knights), 2005-2006 (6 issues)

==== MAX imprint ====
- Doctor Spectrum: Full Spectrum, Marvel Comics (MAX Imprint), 2004-2005 (6 issues)
- Supreme Power: Hyperion, Marvel Comics (MAX Imprint), 2005–2006 (5 issues)
- Supreme Power: Nighthawk, Marvel Comics (MAX Imprint), 2005–2006 (6 issues)

==== Ultimate imprint ====
- Ultimate Nightmare, Marvel Comics, 2004 (5 issues)
- Ultimate Extinction, Marvel Comics, 2006 (5 issues)

==== Epic imprint ====
- The One, Marvel Comics (Epic Comics), 1983 (6 issues)
- Steelgrip Starkey, Marvel Comics (Epic Comics), 1986 (6 issues)
- Trouble, Marvel Comics (Epic Comics), 2003 (5 issues)

=== Other publishers ===
- Harley & Ivy Meet Betty & Veronica, DC Comics and Archie Comics, 2017–18 (6 issues)
- Mouse Guard: Fall 1152 (a.k.a. Series 1), Archaia Studios Press, 2006-2007 (6 issues)
- Star Trek: Assignment Earth, IDW Publishing, 2008
- Star Trek: Mirror Images, IDW Publishing, 2008
- Star Trek: New Frontier, IDW Publishing, 2008
- Star Trek: The Next Generation: Intelligence Gathering, IDW Publishing, 2008
- Star Trek: The Next Generation: The Last Generation, IDW Publishing, 2008–09
- Scott Pilgrim
- Bloodthirsty: One Nation Under Water, Titan Comics, 2015–16

== Seven to nine issues ==
=== Published by DC Comics ===
Note: (MS) designates that the limited series was identified by DC Comics as a "maxiseries" at publication.

- Adam Strange, DC Comics, 2004-2005 (8 issues)
- The Atlantis Chronicles, DC Comics, 1990 (7 issues)
- Batman: City of Light, DC Comics, 2003-2004 (8 issues)
- Batman: Death and the Maidens, DC Comics, 2003-2004 (9 issues)
- Batman Family, DC Comics, 2002-2003 (8 issues)
- Black Adam: The Dark Age, DC Comics, 2007-2008 (8 issues)
- Blackest Night, DC Comics, 2009-2010 (8 issues)
- Challengers of the Unknown, DC Comics, 1991 (8 issues)
- Convergence, DC Comics, 2015 (9 issues)
- Countdown to Adventure, DC Comics, 2007-2008 (8 issues)
- Countdown to Mystery, DC Comics, 2007-2008 (8 issues)
- The Dark Knight III: The Master Race, DC Comics, 2015–2017 (9 issues)
- Deadman, DC Comics, 1985 (7 issues)
- Final Crisis, DC Comics, 2008 (7 issues)
- Flash Gordon, DC Comics, 1988 (9 issues)
- The Human Race, DC Comics, 2005–2006 (7 issues)
- The Great Ten, DC Comics, 2010 (9 issues)
- Green Lantern/Green Arrow, DC Comics, 1983-1984 (7 issues)
- Hammer Locke, DC Comics, 1991-1992 (9 issues)
- Identity Crisis, DC Comics, 2005–2006 (7 issues)
- Infinite Crisis, DC Comics, 2005–2006 (7 issues)
- Justice Society of America, DC Comics, 1991 (8 issues)
- Millennium, DC Comics, 1988 (8 issues)
- Martian Manhunter, DC Comics, 2006-2007 (8 issues)
- Metal Men, DC Comics, 2007-2008 (8 issues)
- Night Force (Vol. 2), DC Comics, 2017 (7 issues)
- OMAC, DC Comics, 2006-2007 (8 issues)
- Outlaws, DC Comics, 1991-1992 (8 issues)
- Ragman (vol. 2), DC Comics, 1991-1992 (8 issues)
- Suicide Squad: Raise the Flag, DC Comics, 2007-2008 (8 issues)
- Terminal City, DC Comics, 1996 (9 issues)
- Time Masters, DC Comics, 1990 (8 issues)
- Uncle Sam & The Freedom Fighters, DC Comics, 2006-2007 (8 issues)
- Who's Who in the Legion of Super-Heroes, DC Comics, 1988 (7 issues)

==== Wildstorm imprint ====
- The American Way, DC Comics (Wildstorm), 2006 (8 issues)
- Captain Atom: Armageddon, DC Comics (Wildstorm), 2005-2006 (9 issues)
- Wildcats: Nemesis, DC Comics (Wildstorm), 2005-2006 (9 issues)
- The Winter Men, DC Comics (Wildstorm), 2005-2006 (8 issues)

==== Vertigo imprint ====
- Neil Gaiman's Neverwhere, DC Comics (Vertigo), 2005-2006 (9 issues)
- The New Deadwardians, Vertigo 2012 (8 issues)

=== Published by Marvel Comics ===
- Avengers: The Children's Crusade, Marvel Comics, 2010-2011 (9 issues)
- 1602, Marvel Comics, 2003 (8 issues)
- Civil War, Marvel Comics, 2006-2007 (7 issues)
- The Dark Tower: The Gunslinger Born, Marvel Comics, 2007 (7 issues)
- Elektra: Assassin, Marvel Comics, 1986-1987 (8 issues)
- House of M, Marvel Comics, 2005 (8 issues)
- Secret Invasion, Marvel Comics, 2008 (8 issues)
- Secret Wars II, Marvel Comics, 1985-1986 (9 issues)
- Spider-Man Team-Up, Marvel Comics, 1995-97 (7 issues)
- The Marvels Project, Marvel Comics, 2009-2010 (8 issues)

==== Ultimate imprint ====
- Ultimate Six, Marvel Comics, 2003-2004 (7 issues)
- Ultimate Power, Marvel Comics, 2006 (9 issues)

=== Other publishers ===
- Nagayana, Raj Comics, 2007-2009 (8 issues)
- Red Rocket 7, Dark Horse Comics, 1998 (7 issues)
- Space Battle Lunchtime, Oni Press, 2016 (8 issues)

== Ten to eleven issues ==
=== Published by DC Comics ===
- Superman & Batman: World's Finest, DC Comics, 1999 (10 issues)
- V for Vendetta, DC Comics, 1988-1989 (10 issues)

=== Published by Marvel Comics ===
- Star Wars: Age of Republic, Marvel Comics, 2018-2019 (10 issues)

=== Other publishers ===
- From Hell (various publishers), 1991-1996 (10 issues)

== Twelve (12) issues ==
=== Published by DC Comics ===
Note: (MS) designates that the limited series was identified by DC Comics as a "maxi-series" at publication.

- Amethyst, Princess of Gemworld, DC Comics, 1983-1984 (MS)
- Batman: Journey Into Night, DC Comics, 2005-2006
- Camelot 3000, DC Comics, 1982-1985 (MS)
- Crisis on Infinite Earths, DC Comics, 1985-1986 (MS)
- DC Challenge, DC Comics, 1985-1986 (MS)
- Doomsday Clock, DC Comics, 2017-2019
- Kamandi Challenge, DC Comics, 2017-2018
- Ion, DC Comics, 2006-2007
- Jemm Son of Saturn, DC Comics, 1984-1985 (MS)
- Justice, DC Comics, 2005-2006
- Justice League Elite, DC Comics, 2004-2005
- Legion Lost, DC Comics, 2000-2001
- Mister Miracle (Vol. 4), DC Comics, 2017-2018
- The Omega Men: The End is Here, DC Comics, 2015-2016
- Outcasts (DC Comics), DC Comics, 1987-1988
- The Shade (Vol. 2), DC Comics, 2011-2012
- Showcase '94, DC Comics, 1994
- Silverblade, DC Comics, 1987 (MS)
- Sun Devils, DC Comics, 1984-1985 (MS)
- Superman & Batman: Generations III, DC Comics, 2003
- Superman: Birthright, DC Comics, 2003
- The Trials of Shazam!, DC Comics, 2006-2007
- Unknown Soldier (vol. 2), DC Comics, 1988-1989
- Watchmen, DC Comics, 1986-1987 (12 issues)

==== Wildstorm Imprint ====
- Global Frequency, DC Comics (Wildstorm), 2002-2004

=== Published by Marvel Comics ===
- Avengers Forever, Marvel Comics, 1998-2000
- Eternals vol. 2, Marvel Comics, 1985-1986
- Foolkiller, Marvel Comics, 1990-1991
- Marvel: The Lost Generation, Marvel Comics, 2000-2002
- Secret Wars, Marvel Comics, 1984-1985
- Spider-Man: Chapter One, Marvel Comics, 1999
- Squadron Supreme, Marvel Comics, 1985-1986
- The Vision vol. 2, Marvel Comics, 2015-2016
- Vision and the Scarlet Witch vol. 2, Marvel Comics, 1985-1986

=== Other publishers ===
- Demo, AiT/Planet Lar, 2003-2004
- Midnight Nation, Top Cow (Joe's Comics imprint), 2000-2002

== More than twelve issues ==
The following list consists of limited series which are longer than 12 issues. However, this list does not include ongoing or continuous series which have come to an end due to cancellation, nor those series which may have had an end determined by their creators, but for which a pre-determined issue number was not announced prior to the publication of the first issue.

=== Published by DC Comics ===
- 52, DC Comics, May 2006 – May 2007 (52 issues)
- Batman: The Long Halloween, DC Comics, December 1996 - December 1997 (13 issues)
- Batman: Dark Victory, DC Comics, November 1999 - December 2000 (14 issues)
- Batman: Legacy, DC Comics, August 1996 - October 1996 (15 issues)
- Brightest Day, DC Comics, May 2010 – May 2011 (26 issues)
- Countdown, DC Comics, May 2007 - April 2008 (51 issues)
- The Filth, Vertigo/DC Comics, August 2002 - October 2003 (13 issues)
- Justice League: Generation Lost, DC Comics, July 2010 – April 2011 (26 issues)
- The New 52: Futures End, DC Comics, May 2014 - June 2015 (49 issues)
- Seven Soldiers, April 2005 – December 2006 DC Comics (30 issues)
- Who's Who: The Definitive Directory of the DC Universe, DC Comics, March 1985 - April 1987 (26 issues)

=== Published by Marvel Comics ===
- Earth X - 14 issues, Marvel Comics, 1999-2000

=== Other publishers ===
- Mage: The Hero Discovered, 1984-1986, Comico (15 issues)
- Mage: The Hero Defined, 1998-1999, Image Comics (15 issues)
- Rising Stars, Top Cow (Joe's Comics imprint), 1999-2005 (24 issues)
- Cerebus the Aardvark, Aardvark-Vanaheim, 1977-2004 (300 issues)
- Bone, Cartoon Books, 1991-2004 (55 issues)
- RASL, Cartoon Books, 2008-2012 (15 issues)

== Unsorted/insufficient data ==
- John Jakes' Mullkon Empire (6 issues) - Tekno Comix
- Neil Gaiman's Phage: Shadow Death (6-issues) - Tekno Comix
- Deadpool: Sins of the Past - Marvel Comics

== See also ==
- List of X-Men limited series
- Spider-Man limited series
