= Manfred Sommer =

Spanish comics artist (1933–2007)

- Born: May 27, 1933 San Sebastian, Spain
- Died: October 3, 2007 (aged 74)
- Areas: artist, writer
- Notable works: Frank Cappa

Manfred Sommer (May 27, 1933 – October 3, 2007) was a Spanish comics artist, best known for the reporter comics series Frank Cappa.

== Career ==
Sommer was born at San Sebastián.

He began his career as an informal pupil of Jesus Blasco, and received creative support from the Blasco family during his young years. Sommer's main influences were Milton Caniff, Frank Robbins and Hugo Pratt.

Sommer created the series El Lobo Solitario, Polux, and El Tigre, before launching his first great success in 1981, Frank Cappa, which was published in the comics magazine Cimoc. Joining the Spanish creators such as Jordi Bernet, Antonio Segura, Leopold Sánchez and José Ortiz, Sommer was part of the ambitious though short-lived Metropol initiative which published three magazines in the early 1980s, Metropol, Mocambo and KO cómics.

== Bibliography of French titles ==
- Frank Cappa
  - 1. Frank Cappa au Brésil (1984, Les Humanoïdes Associés, ISBN 2-7316-0301-1)
  - 2. Somoza et Gomorrhe (1986, Kesselring)
  - 3. Le dernier africain (1988, Kesselring)
  - 4. Viet-Song! (1989, Dargaud, ISBN 2-205-03861-3)
