= Splitting Image =

Splitting Image may refer to:

- Splitting Image (comics), a 1993 comic-book limited series
- Splitting Image (Les Diaboliques album), 1997
- Splitting Image (Kam Moye album), 2009
