= Lo and Behold =

"Lo and behold" is a phrase used to express wonder or surprise.

It may also refer to:

- Lo and Behold, Reveries of the Connected World, 2016 American documentary film
- Come Home Love: Lo and Behold, 2017 Hong Kong sitcom
- "Lo and Beholden", Patti Smith song on her 2000 album Gung Ho

== See also ==
- Low and Behold, a 2007 American film
