= Alpha (comics) =

Alpha in comics may refer to:

- Alpha (DC Comics), a character from DC Comics
- Alpha (Marvel Comics), a character from Marvel Comics
- Alpha (Lombard), a Franco-Belgian comics series
- Alpha Girl, a 2012 Image Comics comic book series by Jean-Paul Bonjour and Jeff Roenning
- Alpha the Ultimate Mutant, a character featured in Marvel Comics
- Alpha (The Walking Dead), an antagonist in the Walking Dead comic series
