= Jorge (comics) =

Spanish comics artist (1921–1960)

- Born: Miquel Bernet Toledano; 16 September 1921 Barcelona, Spain
- Died: August 1960 (38 years) Barcelona, Spain
- Area: Artist
- Pseudonym: Jordi
- Notable works: es:Doña Urraca

Miquel Bernet Toledano (16 September 1921 – August 1960), better known by the pseudonym Jorge, was a Spanish comic artist. His most famous character is es:Doña Urraca.

When the Spanish Civil War began, Bernet was only fifteen years old; Despite this, he falsified his age to enlist as a volunteer in the Republican army. After the defeat of the Republic he passed through several concentration camps in France before returning to Spain, where he had to serve in a disciplinary battalion and later in the navy to purge his past as a republican fighter.

In the early 1940s he began his professional career in comic books, working for a number of publishers, including Bruguera. In 1944, he adopted the pseudonym Jorge, for which he is best known, as a result of the birth of his son, the future prestigious cartoonist Jordi Bernet. At this time he collaborated in several Bruguera adventure books, such as Viajes y aventuras, Superhombres and Tom Mix. He created for the magazine Pulgarcito characters such as Melindro Gutiérrez (1947), El vagabundo Mostacho (1947), Leovigildo Viruta (1947), Las fascinantes aventuras de Tallarín López (1948), Orlando Cucala (1948) and the most popular of them, Doña Urraca (1948) about an evil old woman who only enjoys other people's misfortunes.

During the 1950s he continued creating for Bruguera series such as Sisebuto, detective astuto (1953) about an incompetent detective, Margarita Gutiérrez, la dama de los cabellos (1958) about an ugly Victorian woman who wants to marry or Doña Filo y sus hermanas, señoras bastante llanas (1959) about three old women.

Shortly before his death in 1960, he joined a new project, the magazine Pepe Cola, which was unsuccessful.
