= Clara de noche =

Spanish comic series

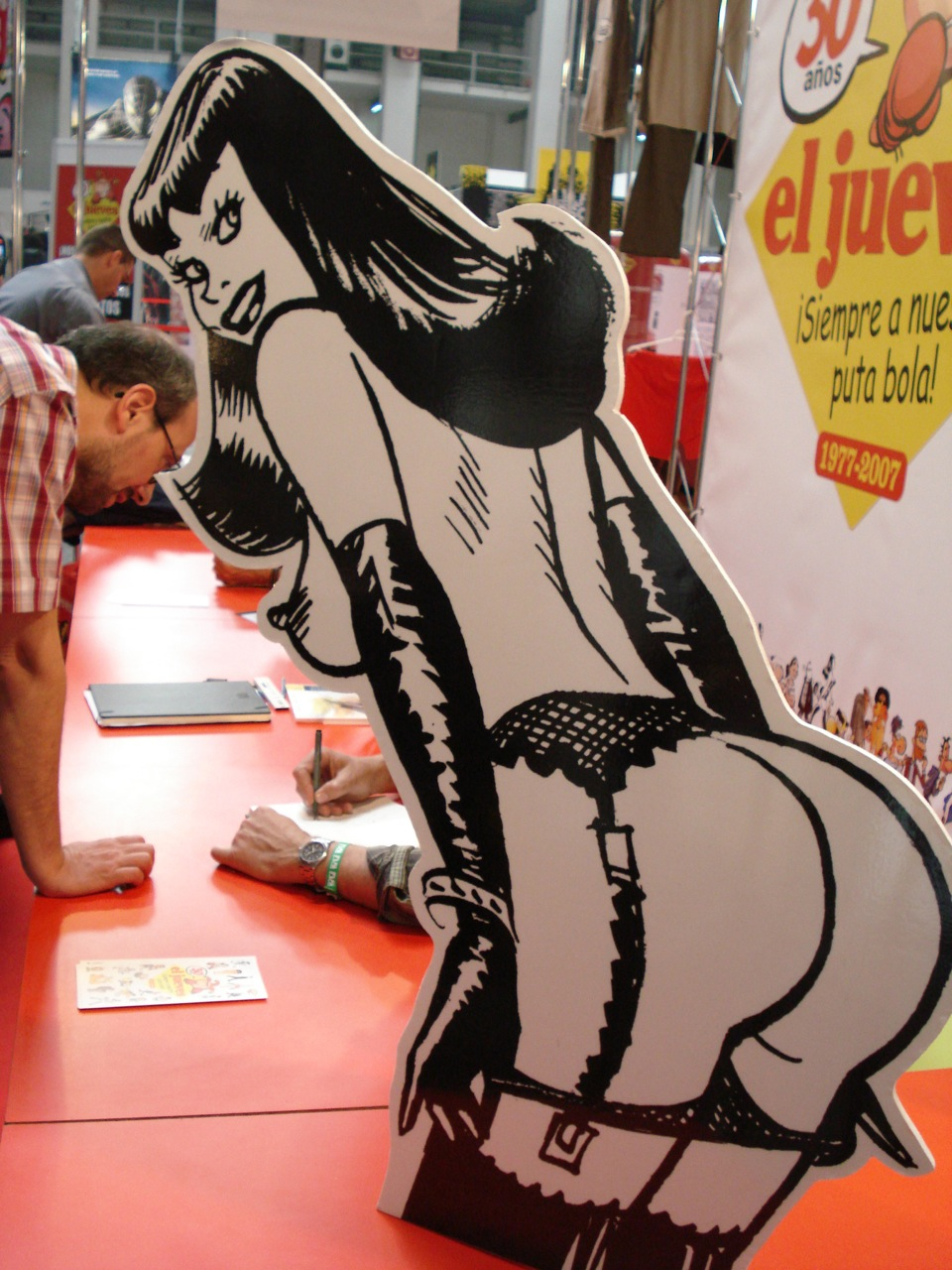
- Life-size figure of Clara de Noche, at the Barcelona International Comic Fair

Publication information
- Publisher: El Jueves (Spain); Página/12 (Argentina)
- Schedule: Weekly
- Format: Ongoing series
- Genre: Erotic
- Publication date: 1992 – 2015
- No. of issues: 1243

Creative team
- Written by: Carlos Trillo; Eduardo Maicas
- Artist: Jordi Bernet

Collected editions
- Haciendo la calle (2000): ISBN 84-88403-81-X
- Todo por la pasta (2005): ISBN 84-9741569--8
- Puta pero honrada (2009): ISBN 978-84-9741578--1
- La historieta de la puta madre (2010): ISBN 978-84-9741608--5

Clara de noche ("Clara at night") is a series of comic strips created in 1992 by comic book writers Carlos Trillo, Eduardo Maicas, and the cartoonist Jordi Bernet. It was published weekly in the Spanish magazine El Jueves, starting from number 772. After 1243 consecutive weeks of circulation, the series ended in 2015 in Spain. It had stopped the year before in Argentina (September 2014), where it was simultaneously published in a young persons supplement called No in the newspaper Página/12. Over 1,000 episodes of the comic strip were also published in the Italian magazine Skorpio. French, German, Greek and Croatian translations were also made. The series has been compiled periodically into albums, and is considered one of the most important works of the three creators.

The central character is the prostitute Clara, and the cartoon reflects her amusing adventures and misadventures as a sex worker, along with the peculiar characters that get involved with her and her son Pablito.

== Description ==
Clara de noche was a humorous series of erotic cartoons. Initially it was produced in black and white but later in color, and covered two pages. It recounts the adventures of a prostitute called Clara Fernandez, and her relationship with clients. Other characters include her very clever son Pablito and her friend Virtudes.

Clara's physical appearance is clearly inspired by the famous American bondage model and pin-up, Bettie Page.

== Controversy ==
Clara became one of the most popular characters of El Jueves, with a large following of fans who saw in her the idealisation of a woman; a libertine, independent and attractive.Despite this success in both in the Spanish and Argentine press, the comic had been the target of strong criticism and denunciations for alleged sexist and degrading content.

However, in recent years, the comic's has been republished in new editions, keeping the character alive within both Spanish and Argentinian pop culture.

== Bibliography ==
- GUIRAL, Antoni (November 2009). Jordi Bernet. 50 años de viñetas (in Spanish). Barcelona: Ediciones El Jueves, S. A. Colección Magnum nº 9. ISBN 978-84-9741-601-6.
- Roach, David (2017). Masters Of Spanish Comic Book Art. Dynamite Entertainment. ISBN 9781524101343.
- Trillo, Carlos; Maicas, Eduardo; Bernet, Jordi (2017). Clara De Noche (in Spanish). Evolution. ISBN 978-84-9167-160-2.
