= Sarvan (comics) =

Cover of French edition Sarvane, published by Dargaud in 1985.

Sarvan is a Spanish science fiction comics series featuring an eponymous character, written by Antonio Segura and drawn by Jordi Bernet. The series was launched in the comics magazine Cimoc in 1982, had a relatively short serial run before the artist and writer moved on to their next collaboration, Kraken.

== Synopsis ==
Sarvan is a woman living in a science fictional environment, on a barbarous planet where a blonde astronaut, Heloin, arrives. The volatile Sarvan claims him for herself, and this generates an almost endless series of struggles. In many of these clashes Sarvan dresses in a revealing bikini that frequently slides down.
