= Wildcat Comic Con =

Fan convention in Williamsport, Pennsylvania

Coordinates: 41°14′6″N 77°1′15.6″W

- Status: Inactive
- Genre: Comic
- Venue: Pennsylvania College of Technology
- Location: Williamsport, Pennsylvania
- Country: United States
- Inaugurated: 2012
- Most recent: 2014
- Organizer: Pennsylvania College of Technology

Wildcat Comic Con was a comic book convention held at the Pennsylvania College of Technology in Williamsport, Pennsylvania, United States, . The convention's name came from the college mascot. Wildcat Comic Con placed extra value on educators and librarians and how comic books and graphic novels can be used in education.

== Programming ==
Wildcat Comic Con typically featured an animation film festival, artist alley, author book-signings, author luncheons, cosplay competition, exhibitors, drawing sessions, fan presentations, LAN party, masquerade ball, portfolio reviews, professional presentations, Star Wars impersonators, vendors, video game contests and demonstrations, and workshops.

== History ==
The convention was the first large scale Comic Con to be held in Central Pennsylvania and the first to be held by a college. The idea for the convention came from John Weaver, a high school teacher. It was primarily organized by Lisette Ormsbee (director of the Madigan Library) and John Shableski (former comics distributor), neither of which had previous experience hosting a comic convention. The convention evolved from lectures hosted with the local high school to promote Penn College's video game program. Early in the planning of the convention, discussions were held about holding it at Williamsport High School and naming it Millionaire Comic-Con after the high school's mascot. Several "ComiXnite" comic book nights were held during the fall at Penn College to build interest in the convention. In the first year the convention provided eighty hours of content. In 2014, the convention held post-event programming that included game shows and gaming.

The convention received financial support from the community in 2013, including a $9,000 grant from the Lycoming County Visitors Bureau and $2,250 from the Pennsylvania Army National Guard. The Visitors Bureau raised its funding from $5,000 in 2012. In 2013 the convention had 38 vendors, an increase from 10 in 2012. The Visitors Bureau granted $10,000 to Wildcat Comic Con in 2014 for advertising.

=== Event history ===
Dates	Location	Atten.	Guests
April 13–14, 2012	Pennsylvania College of Technology - Madigan Library and others. Williamsport, Pennsylvania	About 600	501st Legion "Garrison Carida", Frank Beddor, Robert Berry, Dave Elliot, John Gallagher, Dean Haspiel, Walter Koenig, Mark McKenna, James R. Mattern, Joan Hilty, Josh Neufeld, The Rebel Legion "Echo Base", MK Reed, Tania del Rio, Alex Simmons, David Small, Tracy White, Tom Woodruff Jr., 'yuumei.
September 28, 2013	Pennsylvania College of Technology; Williamsport, Pennsylvania		501st Legion "Garrison Carida", Tonya Adolfson, Nancy Basile, Robert Berry, Michael Bitz, John Buckland, Jerry Craft, Dave Elliot, Heroes 4 Higher, Gene Kannenberg, April Line, Mark McKenna, Jamar Nicholas, Mike Pawuk, Kambrea Pratt, The Rebel Legion, Chris Ring, James R. Mattern, Tim Russ, John Shableski, Alex Simmons, and John Weaver.
September 27, 2014	Pennsylvania College of Technology - Bush Campus Center, College Avenue Labs, Field House, Klump Academic Center, and others. Williamsport, Pennsylvania		John Gallogly, Scott Hanna, Mark McKenna, Pamela Ptak, Chad Renn, James R. Mattern, Alexander Simmons, Barbara Slate, and Eric Stuart.

== See also ==
- New York Comic Con
- Pittsburgh Comicon
