= Leopold Sánchez =

Spanish comic book artist (1948–2021)

- Born: Leopoldo Sánchez; 12 August 1948 Cartagena, Spain
- Died: 12 November 2021 (aged 73)
- Area: artist
- Notable works: Bogey; Creepy; Eerie; Vampirella

Leopoldo Sánchez (12 August 1948 – 12 November 2021) was a Spanish comic book artist.

== Career ==
Sánchez was born in 1948 in Cartagena, Spain. Sánchez started his career in the comic book industry at the age of 14, as an assistant for the artist Gines Garcia. Throughout the 1960s he assisted the artists José Ortiz and Leopold Ortiz. He eventually started working on his own in Britain and France. This included work for the agency Bardon Art as well as Aredit.

Leopold Sánchez was part of the Valencia Studio in Spain along with José Ortiz and Luis Bermejo and the three of them were part of a group that joined with the agency Selecciones Illustradas in 1974 to start work for Warren Publishing. During his stay with Warren, Sanchez would work for all three horror magazines, Creepy, Eerie and Vampirella and would draw 50 stories in total. His story Godeye from Eerie No. 68 (written by Budd Lewis) was included among a list of the top 25 stories to ever appear in a Warren Publication by David A. Roach, author of the Warren Companion. He worked on the series The Spook, The Unholy Creation, The Freaks, and The Pea Green Boat for Eerie, and also drew three stories featuring Vampirella herself.

In 1981, Sánchez created the series Bogey with Antonio Segura, which would be syndicated around the world. He also worked on the series El Justiciero Enmascarado in 1983.

== Selected bibliography ==
- Atletas (1965)
- El Quijote
- Creepy issues 68,77,84–86,88–90,92,93,97–99 (1975–1978)
- Eerie issues 58,60–65,67,68,70–77,79–82,85,87–89 (1974–1978)
- Vampirella issues 39–41,51,56,59,6,162,656,899,104 (1975–1978,1981,1982)
- Bogey (1981)
