= Brad Benischek =

Brad Benischek is a contemporary visual artist, educator, writer and actor living and working in New Orleans, Louisiana.

== Art ==
While Benischek is primarily a cartoon and graphic artist, he also works in multiple media such as video. He is one of the founding members of the Press Street literary and visual arts collective, a New Orleans–based non-profit which promotes art and literature in the community through events, publications and arts education. Press Street's publication "Revacuation" is Benischek's graphic novel relating the experience of both the immediate aftermath of Hurricane Katrina and the year that followed. The characters are anthropomorphized animals, such as birds (whose forced migration filled them with despair), and rabbits and cats (the strangers and friends who took residents of New Orleans in when they needed help badly) that represent the whole horrific evacuation experience. Benischek's work has appeared in numerous publications, and in galleries and art spaces across the South.

== Life ==
Brad Benischek received his Bachelor of Fine Arts from the Parsons School of Design and his Master of Fine Arts from the Savannah College of Art and Design in Savannah, Georgia. He currently lives with his wife, writer Anne Gisleson, in the Bywater district of New Orleans.
