= Alpha Girl =

American comic book series

- Cover of the first issue

Publication information
- Publisher: Image Comics
- Schedule: Monthly
- Format: Ongoing series
- Genre: Post-apocalyptic, Zombies in comics
- Publication date: February 2012 to present
- No. of issues: 5
- Main character: Judith

Creative team
- Written by: Jean-Paul Bonjour, Jeff Roenning
- Artist(s): Robert Love, Dana Shukartsi, Diego Simone

Alpha Girl is an American five issue comic book series written by Jean-Paul Bonjour and Jeff Roenning, published by Image Comics from February 2012. Roenning came up with the series after viewing an old billboard for a Debbie Gibson perfume, with Bonjour comparing the main character of Judith to "a female version of the Evil Dead's resident hero, Ash".

== Plot ==
Alpha Girl follows seventeen-year-old Judith during a zombie apocalypse set during the 1980s. Judith and her brother Buddy were orphaned at a young age by the death of their drug-addicted mother and were placed in separate foster homes. Her brother eventually landed in juvenile detention for attacking a foster father that was molesting him, with Judith resorting to selling used tampons, bodily fluids, and other personal effects in order to raise money for a lawyer to free him. After a cosmetic company botches an attempt to create marketable pheromones, women have begun attacking any men they see and devouring their flesh. As Judith makes her way to where her brother is imprisoned she comes across several different survivors such as teenager Frank and fast food worker Penny. The group brings in several new members such as Judith's former boss, only to quickly lose most of them to either zombies or trigger happy men willing to shoot at anything vaguely female. The group loses member after member until it's just Frank, Penny, and Judith. They run into a group of male vigilantes that shoot at the group due to Penny and Judith's gender. They jump off a bridge to escape them, losing Penny in the process. Frank and Judith manage to make it to Buddy's detention center, unaware that the vigilantes are also en route to the same location in order to rape the female inmates, who they mistakenly believe will be uninfected. Judith frees Buddy, who opens the doors to all of the prison cells in order to free the male inmates so they will not die from lack of food and water. This also releases the female inmates, who are infected and attack the vigilantes and the male inmates. Judith, Frank, and Buddy manage to fight their way out and drive off together. However when Judith and Frank are sleeping Buddy is shown to be mentally unstable, as he is shown to be discussing plans to murder Frank.

== Reception ==
Critical reception for Alpha Girl has been mostly positive, with Comic Vine calling it a "seriously fun, creator owned book". Major Spoilers praised the series' artwork and potential, citing "clear storytelling and striking character design" as highlights. Shock Till You Drop also praised Alpha Girl, saying that the first issue was "one of the best first issues I've read in quite some time".

MTV Geek wrote that Alpha Girl was "a little shaky in its first outing" but praised the art team. ComicsBulletin.com stated that while the comic has "room to grow", the first issue "doesn't seem to know what to make of itself".
