= Hombre (comics) =

French cover of Hombre: Attila.

Hombre is a Spanish comics series written by Antonio Segura and drawn by José Ortiz, first published in 1981 in the magazine Cimoc.

== Publication history ==
Created during the resurgence of Spanish comics in the years after the fall of Franco, Segura wrote Bogey and Orka in the same period, though it was Hombre in collaboration with Ortiz that would prove the most successful. After its initial run in Cimoc, Segura and Ortiz brought Hombre to the magazine KO Comics, one of the three magazines the artists' publishing cooperative Metropol produced during its short existence in 1984. After Metropol ceased business, Hombre relocated to the pages of Cimoc for a second run. The Spanish album releases were published by Norma Editorial.

Enjoying popularity in France, the series was printed in albums by publishers Kesselring, Magic Strip and Soleil Productions. English language translations of the series appeared in Heavy Metal during the 1980s and 1990s. In Italy, it appeared starting from 1982 in the magazine Lanciostory.

== Synopsis ==
A post-apocalyptic series, Hombre is set on Earth after the collapse of the technological civilization. The protagonist moves through the scenery as a disillusioned solitary survivor, with lingering traces of humanity despite the widespread debased nature of most people he encounters. He always has a ragged cigarette in the corner of his mouth, and is often accompanied by a young woman who came of age after the collapse and thus is accommodated to the life of a naked savage. Though the plot is compared with that of Jeremiah, Hombre does not share the underlying motif of hope and survival of humanity of the former.

== See also ==
- Jeremiah (comics)
