= Jordi Bernet =

Spanish comics artist (born 1944)

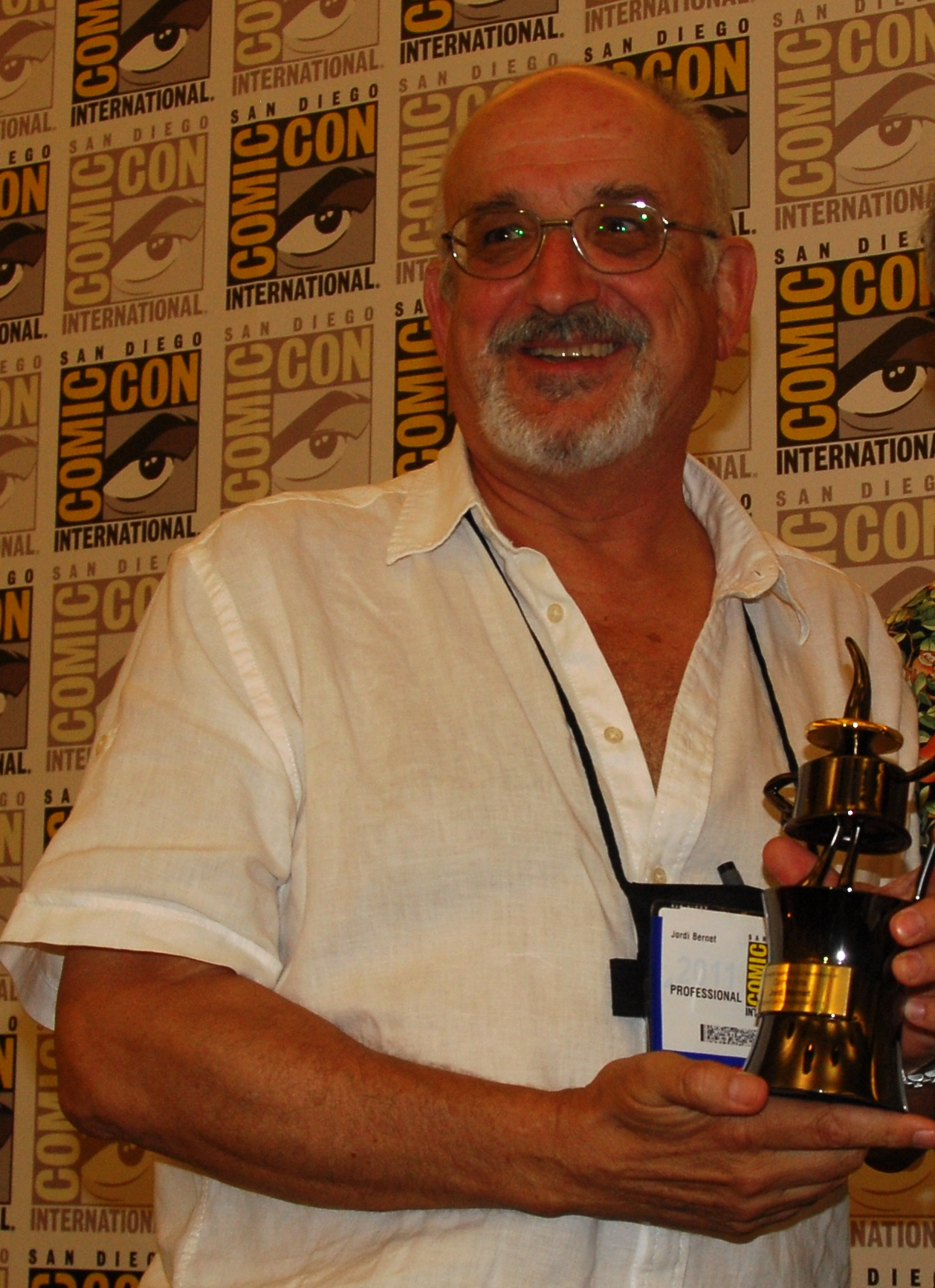
- Jordi Bernet at San Diego Comic-Con in 2011
- Born: Jordi Bernet Cussó; 14 June 1944 (age 82) Barcelona, Spain
- Area: Artist
- Pseudonym: Jordi
- Notable works: Sarvan; Kraken; Torpedo; Clara de noche
- Awards: Full list

Jordi Bernet Cussó (born 14 June 1944) is a Spanish comics artist, best known for the gangster comics series Torpedo and for American weird western comic book Jonah Hex.

== Career ==
He was born in Barcelona, the son of a Spanish comic book artist, Miguel Bernet.

He made his debut in comics at fifteen, continuing his father's humorous series es:Doña Urraca (Mrs. Magpie) after his death in 1960, under the pseudonym "Jordi". While this could support his family, it did not satisfy his artistic ambitions that were inspired by artists such as Hal Foster, Alex Raymond and Milton Caniff. From 1962, Bernet developed a more realistic style, and took on smaller assignments from Italian and British publishers (including the complete 67-issue run of Graham Baker's The Legend Testers in Smash! comic), until he started illustrating for the Franco-Belgian comics magazine Spirou in 1965. He drew the series Dan Lacombe with his uncle Miguel Cussó as writer, and created a similar series Paul Foran with writer José Larraz, but due to disagreements over editing decisions by Dupuis, Bernet ended the relationship with Spirou. Turning to the German market, in the 1970s he collaborated with Cussó to create Wat 69, a sexy and humouristic heroine for the magazine Pip, and Andrax, a science fiction series for Primo, which both became successful in Germany.

=== Later work ===
After the fall of Franco, Bernet returned to Spain and worked for several Spanish comics magazines such as Creepy, Metropol and Cimoc, eventually meeting three writers with whom he would form productive partnerships. With Antonio Segura he created the amazone fantasy series Sarvan, and the series Kraken, depicting a sewer monster terrorizing a futuristic fascist society.

Bernet's work for the US market included illustrating an origin story of Jonah Hex.

Bernet first collaborated with Enrique Sánchez Abulí on several short stories, collected in Historietas negras. When Alex Toth, after producing two stories of Torpedo 1936 in 1981, decided he did not share Abulí's darkly humorous view of mankind and parted with the project, Bernet was asked to continue the work. This became the beginning of a long-lasting series, which became a popular success and was awarded at the Angoulême International Comics Festival. It eventually formed the basis of its own magazine, Luca Torelli es Torpedo in 1992. Later collaborations with Abulí include De vuelta a casa, La naturaleza de la bestia: Ab Irato and Snake: por un puñado de dolares.

Bernet also formed a creative partnership with the Argentine writer Carlos Trillo, resulting in the sexually explicit series Cicca Dum-Dum, the less lewd and more comical series Clara de noche, and several one-shots, including Custer, Light and Bold and Ivánpiire.

Bernet's more recent publications include several albums for the Italian western character Tex Willer, and a run of work for the U.S. comics market, including a Batman story, and a trilogy detailing "the shocking origin" of Jonah Hex. Bernet has later continued to work with Jimmy Palmiotti and Justin Gray on Jonah Hex.

American artist Will Eisner described his impression of Bernet's work in an anthology preface:

Here was a man who was producing pure story-telling art. That is art that uses the kind of minimalism so singular to his draftsmanship that is actually a narrative device in itself. This fit into my own philosophy of sequential narrative art. I pursued the progress of his work with great interest.

== Bibliography ==
=== Spain ===
- Historias negras (1981, with Abulí, Glénat)
- Sarvan (1982, with Segura, Norma Editorial)
- Torpedo (1982, with Abulí, Glénat)
- Kraken (1983, with Segura, Glénat)
- De vuelta a casa (1984, with Abulí, Toutain)
- Custer (1985, with Trillo, Glénat)
- La naturaleza de la bestia: Ab Irato, Glénat
- Snake: por un punado de dolares ?
- Light and Bold (1987, Toutain)
- Ivánpiire' (1989, El Jueves)
- Clara de noche (1992, El Jueves)

=== United States ===
- "Blackout" in Batman Black and White Vol. 2 (1996, DC Comics, ISBN 1-56389-917-5)
- 100 Bullets #26 (1999, Vertigo/DC Comics)
- Solo #6 (2005, DC Comics)
- Jonah Hex #13: "Retribution" (2006, DC Comics)
- Jonah Hex #14: "Fathers And Sons" (2006, DC Comics)
- Jonah Hex #15: "Retribution Part 3" (2006, DC Comics)
- Jonah Hex #21: "The Devil's Paw" (2007, DC Comics)
- Jonah Hex #23: "Who Lives and Who Dies" (2007, DC Comics)
- Jonah Hex #27: "Starman" (2008, DC Comics)
- Jonah Hex #30: "Luck Runs Out" (2008, DC Comics)
- Jonah Hex #32: "The Matador" (2008, DC Comics)
- Jonah Hex #37: "Trouble Come in Threes" (2009, DC Comics)
- Jonah Hex #38: "Hell or High Water" (2009, DC Comics)
- Jonah Hex #42: "Shooting Into the Sun"(2009, DC Comics)
- Jonah Hex #52: "Too Mean to Die"(2010, DC Comics)
- Jonah Hex #54: "Shooting Stars" (2010, DC Comics)
- Jonah Hex #57: "Tall Tales" (2010, DC Comics)
- Jonah Hex #59: "Riders on the Storm" (2010, DC Comics)
- Jonah Hex #61: "Honeymoon Bullets" (2011, DC Comics)
- Jonah Hex #63: "Bury Me in Hell" (2011, DC Comics)
- Jonah Hex #65: "Snowblind" (2011, DC Comics)
- Jonah Hex #67: "Ghost Town" (2011, DC Comics)

== Awards ==
- 1986: Angoulême Best Foreign Album Award, for Torpedo: Chaud devant
- 1991: Barcelona International Comics Fair Gran Premio
- 1994: Nominated for the Harvey Award for Best American Edition of Foreign Material, for Torpedo
- 1995: Nominated for the Harvey Award for Best American Edition of Foreign Material, for Torpedo
- 2011: Comic-Con Inkpot Award

== Sources ==
- Jordi Bernet publications in Spirou, L'Écho des savanes and BoDoï BDoubliées (in French)
- Jordi Bernet Spanish albums Ediciones Glénat (in Spanish)
- Jordi Bernet French albums Bedetheque (in French)
