= Planetoid (comics) =

2012 comic

- No. of issues: 11
- Publisher: Image Comics

Creative team
- Writers: Ken Garing
- Artists: Ken Garing

Original publication
- Published in: June 948485885

Planetoid is a comic first released in June 2012 by Image Comics, written and drawn by Ken Garing. The main character is Silas, a deserter turned space pirate who ends up the sole survivor of his crew and crashes on a planetoid in alien territory, where he must fight off various mechanical creatures, cyborg militias, and the alien military which has a bounty on him.

== Publication history ==
In an interview with Comic Book Resources, Garing stated that he spent years working at improvements on Planetoid, then at a convention showed it to Image, who agreed to publish it. The first story arc is a 5-issue mini-series. The story is intended to continue to unfold in further mini-series and one-shots.

It was originally a miniseries available digitally through Graphicly.

A second monthly miniseries, Planetoid: Praxis, began in February 2017. It ran for six issues.

== Reception ==
Ain't It Cool News calls it "richly and beautifully illustrated" and states that Garing can make "beautiful art and an engaging story". Multiversity Comics praised "Ken Garing’s excellent artistic style" and calls him an "excellent sequential storyteller."
