= Rashit Suleymanov =

Rashit Suleymanov (born 5 July 1950) sculptor from Uzbekistan. He studied at Moscow Fine Arts School, Almaty Fine Arts College and Tashkent Fine Arts Institute.

He is a Member of the Academy of Fine Arts of Uzbekistan. Winner of the Oscar Kokoschka prize 2012, Austria. Author of numerous monuments in Uzbekistan, including the first monument to Babur in Andijan, Uzbekistan's second city. This statue has its own history of controversy during the Soviet era when the authorities sought to suppress works expressing regional identity, but is now a major landmark in Ferghana valley.

His works exist in many private collections in Russia, Turkey, Germany, Britain and other countries. Rashit works in different media ranging from bronze and brass to stone, wood and fire-clay.

== Awards ==
Laureate of the International Babur Foundation, 2001.

In September 2012 Rashit has won Oskar Kokoschka prize after taking part in the symposium “Atelier an Der Donau” in Pochlarn, Austria. His work “Sirtaki” is exhibited as part of the permanent collection in the Museum of Oskar Kokoschka in Austria.

== Artwork and exhibitions ==
In July 2009 Rashit presented the US Embassy in Tashkent with a sculpture he made in memory of the people who died when Hurricane Katrina hit New Orleans in 2005.

In 2007 Rashit has exhibited Trier, Germany. During 2002-2005 Rashit worked in Moscow with a group of palaeontologists from the Academy of Science on the Mammoth Fauna restoration project. Some of his works inspired by the Ice Age fauna are exhibited in Timirayzev Museum, Moscow.

Projects, like ‘The Pearl of Uzbekistan’, ‘The Alley of Poets’, ‘Monument to 26 Pilot-Heroes of WWII’, and ‘The Horse’ at the entrance to the city of Asaka are now well known works of cultural interest in Uzbekistan.

Rashit has not limited himself to major public monuments, and more decorative ornamental commissions have been carried out for organisations and private clients, for example his works adorn the foyer of the Hotel Intercontinental in Tashkent, and the Ministry of International Affairs.

His works span a wide stylistic and thematic range and are masterly executions in different materials, such as bronze, brass, marble, granite, onyx, fire-clay and ceramics.
