= The New Deadwardians =

Comic book series

- Cover for the first issue

Publication information
- Publisher: Vertigo
- Schedule: Monthly
- Format: Limited series
- Genre: Zombies in comics, vampires, supernatural
- Publication date: March - October 2012
- No. of issues: 8

Creative team
- Written by: Dan Abnett
- Artist: I.N.J. Culbard

The New Deadwardians is an eight issue comic book series by Dan Abnett with artwork by I.N.J. Culbard. The series began publication in March 2012 by Vertigo. Abnett has stated that The New Deadwardians will span eight issues but that "we already have a very, very nice idea where we would go next with it, both in terms of the geopolitics of the world but a very specific other case for a second series".

== Plot ==
The comic follows Chief Inspector George Suttle as he attempts to solve crimes in a post-Victorian England where the upper classes are composed of vampires and the lower class of zombies and humans. As Suttle tries to get to the bottom of an upper-class citizen's murder, he discovers that there's more to this murder than meets the eye.

== Themes ==
Common themes in The New Deadwardians involve class relations as well as the women's rights movement as seen by suffragettes fighting for the right to become vampires on their own terms.

== Reception ==
Reception for The New Deadwardians has been overwhelmingly positive, with Comic Book Resources calling it "inventive" and "unique". The New Jersey On-Line and Shock Till You Drop praised the storyline, with the latter writing that "with an end date in sight it only makes me more impatient for the next issue because I want to see what happens next".

CraveOnline commented that the series was "worth a look", but that while the artwork was bright and clean the characters' heads were occasionally misshapen.

== Collected editions ==
The series has been collected in the form of a trade paperback:

- The New Deadwardians (collects The New Deadwardians #1-8, February 13, 2013, ISBN 978-1-4012-3763-9)
