= Morgan Babst =

American author (born 1980)

- Born: New Orleans, Louisiana
- Occupations: Writer, Author
- Website: https://cmorganbabst.com/

C. Morgan Babst (born November 4, 1980) is an American writer.

== Life and education ==
Babst is a native of New Orleans but spent eleven years in New York City following Hurricane Katrina. After studying creative writing at the New Orleans Center for Creative Arts, she went on to study French and Russian literature at Yale University, from which she graduated cum laude. In 2008, she earned an M.F.A. in Fiction Writing from New York University.

== Career ==
Her debut novel, The Floating World, was named one of the Best Books of 2017 by Kirkus Reviews, Amazon, The Dallas Morning News, and Southern Living. The New York Times called The Floating World an elegy for post-Hurricane Katrina New Orleans. The Irish Times called it an excellent debut charting "a family's chaos after Hurricane Katrina."

Her essay "The House of Myth: On the Architecture of White Supremacy", published in Oxford American, was selected as a Notable Essay in The Best American Essays 2020 and her essay "Death Is a Way to Be", published in Guernica, was selected as a Notable Essay in The Best American Essays 2016. Her nonfiction, which tends to center on New Orleans themes, has been published in The Washington Post, Guernica, Oxford American, Saveur, Garden & Gun, Lenny Letter, and LitHub. Babst's short fiction has been published in Bayou Magazine, The Literary Review, The Butter, jmww, Harvard Review, and New Orleans Review.

== Books ==
- The Floating World: A Novel (2017)
