= Floodwall (installation) =

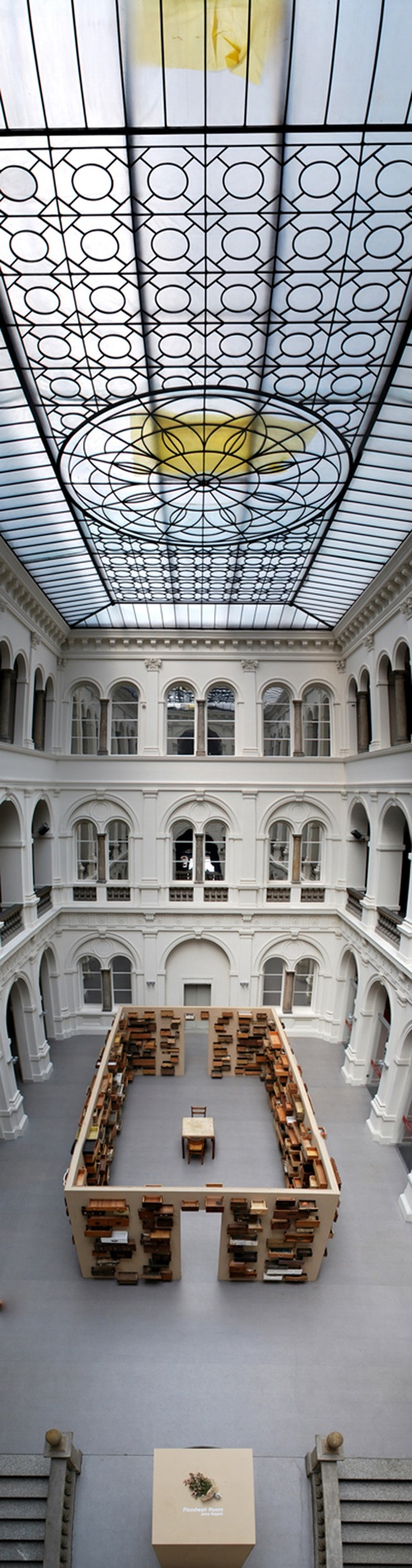
National Museum, Wroclaw, Poland. July-Aug 2010. Photo by Philip Oeschli.

Floodwall, an installation by Jana Napoli, is composed of drawers salvaged in the aftermath of Hurricane Katrina in New Orleans in 2005.

In 2005, two months after Hurricane Katrina and the collapse of the levee system, Napoli collected debris from the storm. She retrieved 750 drawers from dressers, kitchen cabinets, desks and bureaus. The empty drawers were cleaned, and the addresses of the houses were marked on the back. Napoli stated that "Floodwall was an attempt to give voice to the silence of a city in ruin and a people in Diaspora."

The contents that remained were then photographed. The resulting objects, along with the recorded oral histories, make up the installation. Floodwall poses the question to its onlookers: what price are we willing to pay for the protection of the intimacy of our households?

== Construction ==
From Floodwall's first construction in 2007, Napoli has installed it in multiple ways. Sometimes installed as a monumental wall, Floodwall stands eight feet tall and stretches as long as 192 feet.

Floodwall has been displayed on the floor like tombstones in a cemetery, sometimes functioning as a memorial and other times a room that envelops the spectator. The installation has also been used as a setting for collaborative theater performances involving singing and dance.

== Oral History ==
Drawers and Personal Stories is a collection of recorded oral histories from the original drawer owners, gathered by Napoli and Rondell Crier. The gathering of these oral histories is an ongoing project that assembles audio recordings of interviews. A selection of these recordings may be heard on the Floodwall website.

== List of installations ==
• New York, New York- January 4 – February 9, 2007. World Financial Center

• Baton Rouge, Louisiana- July 13 – October 13, 2007. Louisiana State Museum

• Austin, Texas- February 16 – May 25, 2008 Blanton Art Museum

• Cincinnati, Ohio- August 28 – September 14, 2008. Clifton Cultural Arts Center

• New Orleans, Louisiana- November 1, 2008 – January 18, 2009. On Piety, Prospect 1 Biennial

• New Orleans, Louisiana- April 17, 2009 – July 12, 2009. Previously On Piety, an auxiliary exhibition of Prospect One Contemporary Arts Center

• Bremerhaven, Germany- February 2, 2009 - May 10, 2009. "Nach der Flut die Flucht- New Orleans Die Ausgewanderte Stadt/The Flight After the Flood- New Orleans The City Left Behind." Deutsches Auswandererhaus/German Emigration Center

• Wroclaw, Poland- July 14, 2010 – September 5, 2010. National Museum, Wrocław

• Houston, Texas- September 10 - October 23, 2010. Understanding Water and Before (During) After, Photographers Respond to Katrina, Diverse Works Art Space

• Berlin, Germany- September 10, 2010 – October 15, 2010. "On Board of the Kurier Ship" A video of the exhibition may be found here:

• New Orleans, LA- December 3, 2011. Floodwall Cremation

== Cremation ==
On December 3, 2011, all 700+ drawers were cremated on the banks of the Mississippi River at Algiers Point in New Orleans, LA.

== Floating on Fire ==
Since the December 3, 2011 cremation of the Floodwall installation, Floodwall and its cremation lives on in an art documentary entitled, Floating on Fire, by the studio ManifiestaFilms out of Wrocław, Poland and produced by ManifiestaFilms and Napoli. Floating on Fire made its screening debut at the 2015 New Orleans Film Festival.

The film will be shown next in the New Horizons International Film Festival in Wroclaw, Poland.
