= Bogey (comics) =

Spanish crime comics

Bogey is a Spanish crime comics and science fiction series set in a futuristic world, written by Antonio Segura and drawn by Leopoldo Sánchez, featuring the central character Bogey Nicolson, a private detective. It was first self-published by the artist Sánchez in 1981 and later in the Spanish comics magazines Cimoc and K.O. Comics. In the UK it was published in the magazine Warrior.

== Influences ==
Dave Gibbons stated in an interview published in Artists on Comic Art, that Bogey stories, published in the English comics magazine Warrior, influenced the page layout for Watchmen. According to Dave Gibbons in an interview published in the blog 'Con C de Arte', Bogey's stories published in the English magazine Warrior influenced the page design of Watchmen.
