= Bloodthirsty: One Nation Under Water =

- Bloodthirsty: One Nation Under Water, cover artist Nick Runge

Publication information
- Publisher: Titan Comics
- Schedule: Monthly
- Format: Limited series
- Genre: Thriller
- Publication date: September 2015 - February 2016
- No. of issues: 5
- Main character(s): Virgil LaFleur; Simon Wolfinger; Mother Taneesha; Dante; Dr. Andrea Yoshimi

Creative team as of January 2015
- Created by: Mark Landry
- Written by: Mark Landry
- Penciller(s): Ashley Witter, Richard Pace, Georges Jeanty
- Inker(s): Ashley Witter, Richard Pace, Dexter Vines
- Colorist(s): Ashley Witter, Sian Mandrake & Justin Prokowich
- Editor(s): Tom Williams, John Hazners, Chris Fortier

Collected editions
- Bloodthirsty: One Nation Under Water: ISBN 978-1785851094

Bloodthirsty: One Nation Under Water is a five-issue creator-owned comic book limited series written by American writer Mark Landry (of Teen Beach Movie) and published by British comics publisher Titan. The interior art was penciled by Ashley Witter and Richard Pace, and includes a three-page epilogue drawn by Georges Jeanty. Interior colorists were Ashley Witter, and the team of Sian Mandrake and Justin Prokowich. The publisher offered variant covers for each issue, including one cover each by Ashley Witter, one by Nick Runge, one by Georges Jeanty, and two by Joel Carpenter. Series editors included Tom Williams (Titan), John Hazners and Chris Fortier.

== Plot ==
The story begins with Coast Guard rescue swimmer Virgil LaFleur as he rescues victims of Hurricane Katrina from their rooftops in New Orleans in the aftermath of the infamous flood of 2005. When Virgil's younger brother, Trey, informs him that their parents have not checked in at the evacuee station at Louis Armstrong airport, Virgil gets his Coast Guard pilot to take him to his parents' flooded neighborhood. There, Virgil swims through his parents' submerged home to find his parents stuck in their attic - his father already deceased and his mother near death. Virgil attempts to swim his mother out through the flooded house, but nearly drowns and is pulled from the water by Trey and another Coast Guard crew member.

Ten years later, the comic recaps that Virgil couldn't go near the water after the incident, and is now working as a ditch digger after having put his younger brother Trey through college (fulfilling a promise he made to his dying mother). A new storm - Rose - is on the horizon, and Virgil is planning to evacuate New Orleans forever. He begs Trey to go with him, but Trey - now a scientist - is in the middle of an exciting - and secretive - longevity project at Wolfinger Biomed, one of many companies owned by local carpetbagger Simon Wolfinger. Wolfinger is portrayed as a disaster capitalist who - along with partner-in-crime Howard Lawrence - preyed upon the city's weakened post-disaster status to enrich themselves through greed and corruption.

When Trey dies in a fire at Wolfinger Biomed, Virgil has reason to suspect that his brother was murdered. Having nothing left to live for, Virgil decides to investigate his brother's death, even if that means staying in New Orleans long enough to die in the coming hurricane. What he uncovers is an underground cabal of hemovores - "an organism that ingests blood as the main part of its diet". Unlike vampires, the hemovores in "Bloodthirsty" are not supernatural beings; they are humans with a mutated gene that controls longevity. Their bodies are in a constant state of repair, which deprives their cells of oxygen. In order to compensate for this loss, they must consume fresh (oxygenated) human blood daily or they will die.

Virgil learns that Trey had unwittingly taken part in a plan to synthesize the hemovore mutation, creating a serum that Wolfinger intends to sell on the black market to anyone wealthy enough to procure its fountain-of-youth-like properties. With only hours left before Hurricane Rose makes landfall in New Orleans, Virgil faces an uphill battle to stop Wolfinger from spreading the serum and killing thousands of innocent people in the process.

== Characters ==
- Virgil LaFleur - A mixed-race former Coast Guard rescue swimmer whose post-traumatic stress keeps him out of the water. Having lost both his parents to Hurricane Katrina - and nearly drowning himself in the flood - Virgil starts the story as a washed-out former real-world hero who has lost his purpose in life. When his last remaining relative - his younger brother - is murdered, Virgil finds one last reason to live: to find out who is responsible for Trey's death and to bring them to justice.
- Simon Wolfinger - The head of a nebulous conglomerate that seems to have taken over most of New Orleans in the years following Hurricane Katrina, Simon Wolfinger seems responsible for every major decision in town, including who lives and who dies. A genetic mutation provided Wolfinger with the "gift" of enhanced longevity; the unpleasant side effect is that he must consume fresh human blood daily in order to survive.
- Trey LaFleur - Virgil's younger brother is smart and ambitious. As a head of the longevity project at Wolfinger Biomed, Dr. LaFleur successfully replicates the gene mutation that Simon Wolfinger has naturally - making a lab rat live well beyond its typical shelf life. However Trey's employer failed to mention the grisly side effect of the mutation - a discovery Trey makes when he sees the lab rat feeding on the blood of another rat.
- Mother Taneesha and the Hell's Belles - Cross-dressing pimp (and hemovore) Mother Taneesha runs a seedy nightclub in New Orleans' "Storyville" district. The club's in-house dancers - the Hell's Belles - are also hemovores, and they use the club's back rooms to lure unsuspecting tourists and captured drifters to their deaths, draining them of their blood for later consumption.
- Howard Lawrence - Blind, elderly real estate mogul Howard Lawrence is Simon Wolfinger's business partner. Clearly not a hemovore by birth, Lawrence is intent on receiving the synthesized hemovore serum that Virgil's brother Trey unwittingly created.
- Dante - A homeless graffiti artist, Dante spends his time painting fleur de lis - the symbol of "Who Dat", his favorite comic book hero - on the exterior walls of the city's buildings. Dante encounters Virgil, and the two strike up an unlikely friendship. Dante ends up saving Virgil's life more than once during the series.
- Dr. Andrea Yoshimi - It is unclear what her medical specialty is, but Dr. Yoshimi first meets Virgil LaFleur on her emergency room shift, where she stitches him up after a fight with an unknown assailant. The two share chemistry and become allies in the fight for New Orleans.
- Detective Fontenot - A grizzled, apathetic and corrupt police detective with a penchant for Southern witticisms. Fontenot is the person who informs Virgil of his brother's death. It is clear that Virgil does not trust Fontenot's explanation concerning the cause of Trey's death. It is implied that Virgil and Fontenot have met previously, when Virgil was discharged from the Coast Guard for claiming to have seen dozens of murder victims in the Katrina floodwaters while he was drowning. Fontenot seems to think of Virgil as a conspiracy theorist.
- Officer Arnaud - The rookie cop who is paired up with Fontenot. Arnaud - a millennial - is young and idealistic. He doesn't follow Fontenot's advice to look the other way and ignore the mysterious circumstances surrounding Trey LaFleur's death. Arnaud's determination to do the right thing is ultimately what inspires Fontenot to redeem himself as a public servant.
- Mayor Marcantel - The fictional mayor of New Orleans is rotund, sweaty, and speaks with a thick Cajun dialect. His impotence as an elected official is predicated by his deference to his top campaign donor, Simon Wolfinger. The mayor subjugates himself to Wolfinger publicly, referring to the businessman as the city's "Uncle Simon".

== Publication history ==
After a successful Kickstarter campaign in 2013 and a protracted art production process, Titan Comics announced that it would publish Bloodthirsty at the Diamond Retailer Presentation on 11 July 2015, at San Diego Comic-Con. As announced by Christine Marie of Bleeding Cool: "Bloodthirsty is a visceral revenge thriller that merges the real-world hopes and horrors of a post-disaster community with an engaging thread of political corruption, class divide and blood-curdling terror!"

In addition to story content, each issue includes a "backmatter" feature that reflects upon the Hurricane Katrina disaster and the lessons learned by key figures of the rescue and recovery operation. The first issue's interview is with Lieutenant General Russel Honoré (ret.), who led the Joint Task Force Katrina rescue operation for then-president George W. Bush. Other interviewees include Louisiana Environmental Action Network spokesperson Paul Orr, Coast Guard Petty Officer First Class Dave Cadorette (a rescue swimmer), Coast Guard Petty Officer First Class Matthew O'Dell (a rescue swimmer) and former Coast Guard Captain Roger Laferriere. Each interviewee tells the story of what the Katrina disaster meant to them both in terms of the human cost and lessons learned for future disasters.

Titan released each of the five chapters monthly from September 2015 to February 2016. The collected volume was released on 8 June 2016.

Issue # and Subtitle	Release date	Writer	Penciler/Inker	Colorist
Chapter 1: "Blood Brothers"	30 September 2015	Mark Landry	Ashley Witter	Ashley Witter
Chapter 2: "Bloodlust"	4 November 2015	Mark Landry	Ashley Witter	Ashley Witter
Chapter 3: "Blood Pressure"	2 December 2015	Mark Landry	Ashley Witter	Ashley Witter
Chapter 4: "A Clot to Contend With"	6 January 2016	Mark Landry	Richard Pace	Sian Mandrake & Justin Prokowich
Chapter 5: "Blood in the Water" and Epilogue	3 February 2016	Mark Landry	Richard Pace (Georges Jeanty & Dexter Vines for the Epilogue)	Sian Mandrake & Justin Prokowich
Collected Volume	5 July 2016	(Same as Above)	(Same as Above)	(Same as Above)

== Reception ==
Reviews of the comic's single issues have been largely positive. Critics from mainstream online blogs like Pop Culture Uncovered and Fanboy Comics to more specialized blogs like Black Girl Nerds and Graphic Policy have praised the comic for blending the entertaining with the socially conscious.

"To be honest, I was surprised that Landry was a Caucasian man writing from the standpoint of Virgil, a mixed race man with a black mother and white father. You might think this is irrelevant, but as a female geek of color, I was overjoyed because it shows a level of consciousness that isn’t always present in media today when it comes to minorities, especially the ignored voices of the poor and disenfranchised in New Orleans during and after Katrina. There are other characters of color in Bloodthirsty #1, and Landry is remarkably respectful yet honest when writing them, which was also impressive. Virgil is a hero we can all relate to. He has seen awful things, and he is troubled. He has experienced a staggering amount of loss, and he still won’t back down. That’s a hero we can all aspire to be, and we don’t have to be rich like Tony Stark or Bruce Wayne, or superhuman like Superman or Spider-Man." - Estefany Gonzalez of Geek Mundo

"This story has depth, and is more than just a fun, flash in the pan. Virgil is a character that you can really get invested in and care for. The villains in this story have potential to be the scariest kind, the ones that really exist, and who doesn’t love that? This is suspenseful thriller that I can’t wait to drink my fill of." - BlackGirlNerds

"Some of my favorite stories are set against the back drop of real life events because of the emotions associated with them. With the catastrophe of Katrina still fresh in the mind of the public; Bloodthirsty: One Nation Under Water accomplishes its goal to introduce a riveting story and the genesis of a hometown hero." - Pauly D of Pup Culture Uncovered
