= Splitting Image (comics) =

Cover of the first issue

Splitting Image is a 2 issue comic-book limited series created in 1993 by Don Simpson (though based on an idea from Image co-founder Rob Liefeld) and published by Image Comics. It satirizes the founders of Image and their initial titles such as Savage Dragon, Spawn, Youngblood, WildC.A.T.s: Covert Action Teams, Cyber Force, Shadowhawk, Wetworks, and Pitt. Issue #2 ends with a cliffhanger ending featuring Megaton Man, Captain Everything from normalman, and Mr. Spook from Tales of the Beanworld which was continued in the Megaton Man/normalman Special. In 2017, to celebrate the publisher's 25th anniversary, Image released an 80-Giant Special collecting both issues of Splitting Image along with the Normalman/Megaton Man special and supplementary material.
