= Antonio Segura =

Spanish comics writer (1947–2012)

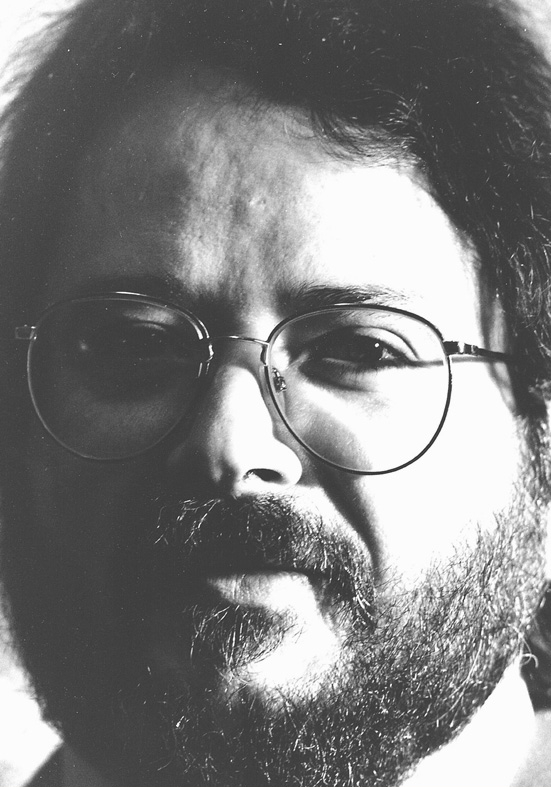
- Born: June 13, 1947 Valencia, Spain
- Died: January 31, 2012 (aged 64)
- Area: Writer
- Notable works: Hombre; Bogey; Sarvan; Kraken; Jack el Destripador; Eva Medusa
- Awards: full list

Antonio Segura (June 13, 1947 – January 31, 2012) was a Spanish comics writer.

== Biography ==
Antonio Segura's earliest work appeared in the early 1980s after meeting the experienced artists José Ortiz, Luis Bermejo and Leopoldo Sanchez who were looking for a scriptwriter untainted by the industry. Taking this opportunity, he wrote a series for each of them Hombre, Orka and Bogey, respectively. With some effort, these became published, and joined in the wave of emerging Spanish adult comics that bloomed in the post-Franco era. Hombre began a successful run in the magazine Cimoc, and Segura started collaborating with Jordi Bernet, creating the amazone fantasy series Sarvan, also appearing in Cimoc.

In 1983, Segura and a collective of artists including Bernet, Ortiz, Sánchez and Manfred Sommer, made an attempt to establish a monthly comics periodical, on the premise of artists' freedom. It was named Metropol and bore the tag "Papeles falaces urbanos y criminales" (Deceptive, Urban and Criminal Characters/Pages). Several of Segura's series were featured, among them Morgan with Ortiz, and Kraken with Bernet. The latter was staged in a dystopic city, also named Metropol, above the sewers where the series' monster, the Kraken, dwelled. The magazine was published for a total of 12 issues.

Later, Segura continued his prolific partnership with José Ortiz, resulting in a large body of work, including Las Mil Caras de Jack el Destripador (The Thousand Faces of Jack the Ripper), and the humorous sci-fi series Burton & Cyb. In the early 1990s, he started the series Eva Medusa with Ana Miralles, a work which won two Haxtur Awards. In the most recent years, Segura has worked for the Italian comics market, creating two episodes of Magico Vento and new stories for the character Tex Willer.

== Awards ==
- 1993: Haxtur Award, Best Long Comic Strip, for Eva Medusa
- 1993: Haxtur Award, Best Script, for Eva Medusa
