= Kraken (comics) =

- Cover of the Le roi des égouts album
- Created by: Antonio Segura; Jordi Bernet

Publication information
- Formats: Original material for the series has been published as a strip in the comics anthology(s) Metropol and Zona 84.
- Original language: Spanish
- Genre: Science fiction
- Publication date: 1983
- Main character(s): Lieutenant Dante; The GAS patrol The Kraken

Creative team
- Writer(s): Antonio Segura
- Artist(s): Jordi Bernet

Kraken is a Spanish comics series, written by Antonio Segura and drawn by Jordi Bernet, first published in the magazine Metropol in 1983. The stories are centered on protagonist Lieutenant Dante, a policeman in a dystopic society patrolling the violent sewers of the fictional city Metropol.

== Publication history ==
As one of the flagship comics series to appear in the Spanish magazine Metropol, founded by an artist group to achieve greater creative freedom, it was staged in a city bearing the magazine's name, similar to other comics native to the publication. As the magazine's run proved short-lived and was forced to shut down, the series continued its run in Zona 84. Initially published in black and white, later album issues were released in colour.

The stories are presented in relatively short episodes, and feature concentrated violence, claustrophobic settings and little sentimentality. There are also occasional appearances of characters who bear resemblance to real-life actors (such as Orson Welles' character in Touch of Evil and Max von Sydow's character in The Exorcist).

== Characters ==
- Lieutenant Dante leads a sewer patrol unit, in its efforts to hunt down the Kraken and combat the criminal activity that flourishes in the underground maze of tunnels.
- The GAS patrol, the Subterranean Action Group, who make up Dante's soldiers. A police unit with an extremely high mortality rate.
- The Kraken, the antagonist monster, is almost a mythical character, by horrific reputation and rare appearances.
