= Limited series (comics) =

Comic book series of predetermined length

In the field of comic books, and particularly in the United States, a limited series is a comics series with a predetermined number of issues. A limited series differs from an ongoing series in that the number of issues is finite and determined before production, and it differs from a one shot in that it is composed of multiple issues. The term is often used interchangeably with miniseries (mini-series) and maxiseries (maxi-series), usually depending on the length and number of issues. In Dark Horse Comics' definition of a limited series, "this term primarily applies to a connected series of individual comic books. A limited series refers to a comic book series with a clear beginning, middle and end". Dark Horse Comics and DC Comics refer to limited series of two to eleven issues as miniseries and series of twelve issues or more as maxiseries, but other publishers alternate terms.

== Characteristics ==
A limited series can "vary widely in length, but often run from three to ten issues. They can usually be distinguished from ongoing series by having both the current issue number and total issue number on the cover and/or in the indicia". The limited series has a single story to tell. It follows the standard plot set-up of beginning, middle and end. Usually, all plot points are covered by the end of the series. There have been limited series done in an anthology format, but only a few of these have been produced.

Limited series are often done by a single creative team, but in cases where there are changes, it is usually the writer who remains constant throughout the run, while the artist(s) may change. The number of issues is usually determined by some combination of the writer's plotting and editorial mandate.

== History ==
In 1979, in the process of recovering from the DC Implosion, publisher DC Comics experimented with a new format in the World of Krypton "miniseries", as DC termed such short-run works. The new format allowed the company to tell stories that may not have fit into an ongoing series and to showcase characters in a short story without the risk and obligations of an ongoing monthly. In 1980, DC followed World of Krypton with the three-issue series The Untold Legend of the Batman, by Len Wein, John Byrne, and Jim Aparo. DC produced three more limited series in 1981, featuring another Krypton series, the Legion of Super-Heroes, and the Green Lantern Corps.

=== The 1980s ===
With the success of the miniseries format, DC followed by experimenting with longer stories and concepts outside their universe of superheroes. Debuting in 1982, Camelot 3000 was the first limited series to run to 12 issues. DC coined the term "maxiseries" as a promotional description for this.

It did not take long for other publishers to begin using the limited series format. In 1982, Marvel Comics published its first limited series, Marvel Super Hero Contest of Champions, followed shortly thereafter by miniseries featuring the X-Men's Wolverine and the Avengers' Hercules, and then The Vision and the Scarlet Witch. At first, Marvel used the limited series format to feature popular characters from team titles and put them in solo adventures. Contest of Champions brought forth the idea of a major event affecting the Marvel Universe; crossovers were introduced in limited series form before the concept of multi-title crossovers was even conceived. This would be taken further with the 12-issue Secret Wars saga in 1984 and by DC's saga Crisis on Infinite Earths in 1985-1986.

DC Comics continued to invest in the format, which led to the release of some of the most influential and popular comics of all time, such as Watchmen (1986) by Alan Moore and Dave Gibbons (12 issues) and The Dark Knight Returns (1986) by Frank Miller, released as a 4-issue series in "prestige format". Miller also created another limited series for Marvel, Elektra: Assassin (1986) with 8 issues written by Miller and illustrated by Bill Sienkiewicz.

== See also ==
- Graphic novel
- List of limited series
- Miniseries, a similar concept in television
