= Ohio Comic Con =

- Former Mid-Ohio Con logo
- Status: Defunct
- Genre: Speculative fiction
- Venue: Richland County Fairgrounds (1985–1991); Hyatt Regency/Columbus Convention Center (1993–1996); Adam's Mark Hotel (1997–1999); Hilton Columbus Hotel at Easton Town Center (2000–2005); Greater Columbus Convention Center (2006–2019)
- Locations: Mansfield, Ohio (c. 1980–1995); Columbus, Ohio (1996–2019)
- Country: United States
- Inaugurated: 1980
- Most recent: 2019
- Attendance: 5,000 – 8,000 (2007)
- Organizer: R.A.P. Promotions (1980–2007); GCX Holdings (2008–2009); Wizard Entertainment (2010–2019)
- Filing status: For Profit
- Website: wizardworld.com/index.php/home-ohio

The Wizard World Columbus Comic Con, formerly known as Mid-Ohio Con and then the Wizard World Ohio Comic Con, was a comic book convention held during the fall in Columbus, Ohio, United States, at the Greater Columbus Convention Center. Initially held in early November, from 1994–2007 the Mid-Ohio Con took place on the first weekend after Thanksgiving. Normally a two-day event (Saturday and Sunday), in 2012 it expanded to three days (Friday through Sunday).

The Mid-Ohio Con was founded in 1980. In 2010, the convention was acquired by Wizard Entertainment.

== History ==
The Mid-Ohio Con was founded in 1980 by voice actor and announcer Roger A. Price. Over the years, Price used the show to raise money for various charities (frequently the March of Dimes), raising a total of over $1,000,000. (Price himself was a polio survivor.) Initially, the convention was held in various venues throughout central Ohio before settling in Columbus, where it has been located since 1993.

The 1985 show, held at the Richland County Fairgrounds in Mansfield, Ohio, featured the announcement of John Byrne's relaunch of the Superman books. (Byrne made regular appearances at the convention from 1981–2004.) In 1988 small press publisher Bob Corby premiered the first issue of Oh, Comics!, a 40-page minicomic featuring the work of twelve Ohio small press artists. Corby produced new issues of Oh, Comics! in conjunction with the Mid-Ohio Con for the next twenty years, ultimately publishing the work of over 100 creators ranging in age from ten to sixty.

By 1993, the show had moved to the Hyatt Regency and Greater Columbus Convention Center. The 1994 show featured an auction and a costume contest/dance party, both benefiting the Columbus Ronald McDonald House. The 1996 show featured a "Small Press Expo." The 1997 show moved to Columbus' Adam's Mark Hotel and featured a Tony Isabella roast. The 1998 show was promoted in the panels of Tom Batiuk's syndicated newspaper strip, Funky Winkerbean, in which one of the characters journeyed to the show to search for a long-lost Hopalong Cassidy comic book.

In 2000, the show expanded and moved to the Hilton Columbus Hotel at Easton Town Center. The 2002 and 2003 conventions featured special karaoke parties hosted by actor Andy Hallett. Both parties raised money for the American Diabetes Association.

The 2005 edition of the show, held at the Hilton Columbus Hotel at Easton Town Center, later became known for being the site of a sexual assault by Comic Book Legal Defense Fund (CBLDF) director Charles Brownstein. The incident was reported to the police at the time, and 15 years later led to Brownstein's resignation from the CBLDF.

In 2006, the Mid-Ohio Con increased in size again and moved to Battelle Hall, part of the Greater Columbus Convention Center.

In January 2008, founder Price announced he was retiring, and his company R.A.P. Promotions would entertain offers for the convention. In May 2008, the show was acquired by James and Bill Henry of GCX Holdings and merged with Jamie and Teresa Colegrove's Ohio Comic Con. By then, the show had been struggling a bit, and GCX invigorated new life into it, as well as working closely with Columbus-area comics creators.

In November 2010 the Mid-Ohio Con was acquired by Wizard Entertainment for $77,500. In 2012 it was renamed the Wizard World Ohio Comic Con.

For 2015, as Wizard was expanding further into Ohio with the new Wizard World Cleveland Comic Con, the Columbus show was renamed the Wizard World Columbus Comic Con.

The last scheduled Wizard World Ohio Comic Con was held in October 2019; no new dates have been scheduled.

=== Dates and locations ===
Dates	Location	Official guests	Notes
November 1980			
November 14, 1981	Quality Inn Park Place, Mansfield, Ohio	Special guest of honor: John Byrne	
November 1982			
November 1983	Fairhaven Hall, Richland County Fairgrounds, Mansfield	David Prowse	
November 1984			
November 9–10, 1985	Fairhaven Hall, Richland County Fairgrounds, Mansfield	John Byrne, Dave Sim	$23,400 raised for the March of Dimes
November 8–9, 1986	Fairhaven Hall, Richland County Fairgrounds, Mansfield	Guests of honor: Frank Miller, John Byrne, Stephen R. Bissette, John Totleben, Bill Sienkiewicz	
November 1987	Fairhaven Hall, Richland County Fairgrounds, Mansfield	Guest of honor: Dave Sim; other guests: Kevin Eastman, Peter Laird, John Ostrander, Denys Cowan, Mike Grell, Carol Kalish	
November 26–27, 1988	Fairhaven Hall, Richland County Fairgrounds, Mansfield	Stan Lee (special guest), Todd McFarlane, John Byrne, Terry LaBan	
November 1989	Fairhaven Hall, Richland County Fairgrounds, Mansfield		
November 1990	Fairhaven Hall, Richland County Fairgrounds, Mansfield		
November 1991	Fairhaven Hall, Richland County Fairgrounds, Mansfield		
September 1992	Ashland University, Ashland	Roger Stern, John Byrne, and Jim Shooter	Convention coincides with publication of DC's The Death of Superman.
November 13–14, 1993	Hyatt Regency/Convention Center, Columbus	John Byrne, Mike Mignola, Roger Stern, Dave Sim	Tickets: $5/day
November 26–27, 1994	Hyatt Regency and Greater Columbus Convention Center	Special guests: Sergio Aragonés, John Byrne, Dick DeBartolo, Dick Giordano, Tony Isabella, Joe Jusko, William Messner-Loebs, P. Craig Russell, Stan Sakai, Louise Simonson, Walter Simonson, Don Simpson, Jeff Smith, Roger Stern, Jim Valentino, and Mark Waid; other guests: Darryl Banks, Scott Beaderstadt, Pat Block, Gary Cody, Dennis Cramer, Dan Davis, Kevin Dooley, Matt Feazell, Pat Garrahy, Jay Geldhof, Bob Ingersoll, Hank Kanalz, Robert A. Kraus, Steve Lieber, Roland Mann, Eddy Newell, Mike & Diana Okamoto, Kevin Rasel, Beau Smith, Chris Sprouse, Ernie Stiner, and Matt Webb	15th anniversary show
November 25–26, 1995	Hyatt Regency and Greater Columbus Convention Center	Special guest: Barry Windsor-Smith; other guests: Mark Evanier, Roger Stern, William Messner-Loebs, John Byrne, Sergio Aragonés, Brian Michael Bendis, Martin Egeland, Dick Giordano, David Mack, Joe Pruett, Beau Smith, Jim Shooter, Jeff Smith, and Bernie Wrightson	
November 30–December 1, 1996	Hyatt Regency and Greater Columbus Convention Center	Roger Stern, Darryl Banks, Dick DeBartolo, Tom and Mary Bierbaum, Tony Isabella, Paul Jenkins, Mark Waid, Leah Adezio, Dan Mishkin, Berni Wrightson, Mark Crilley, P. Craig Russell, Jim Shooter, Murphy Anderson, Dick Ayers, Tom Batiuk, John Byrne, Dick DeBartolo, Julius Schwartz, and Jeff Smith	Admission: $10/day, $15/weekend
November 29–30, 1997	Adam's Mark Hotel	John Byrne, Roger Stern, Kurt Busiek, Brent Anderson, Sergio Aragonés, Mark Evanier, Mart Nodell, Tony Isabella, Joseph Michael Linsner, Sheldon Moldoff, Terry Moore, Steve Lieber, Jim Ottaviani, Paul Smith, Alvin Schwartz, Murphy Anderson, and Bernie Wrightson	
November 28–29, 1998	Adam's Mark Hotel	Adam West, Frank Gorshin, Tom Batiuk, Tony Isabella, Mark Waid, Paul Storrie, KC Carlson, Dan Davis, Roger Stern, Beau Smith, Steve Lieber, Bob Ingersoll, and "Trilogy Tour" II members Jeff Smith, Charles Vess, Linda Medley, Mark Crilley, Jill Thompson, and Stan Sakai	
November 27–28, 1999	Adam's Mark Hotel	Guest of honor: Harlan Ellison; other guests: Lou Ferrigno, Dawn Wells, Mark Goddard, Gerard Christopher, Mark Waid, Kurt Busiek, Tom Grummett, Karl Kesel, Joe Kelley, Mike Wieringo, Barry Kitson, and Dave Olbrich	20th anniversary show
November 25–26, 2000	Hilton Columbus Hotel at Easton Town Center	June Lockhart, Bill Mumy, Angela Cartwright, Jon Provost, and Yvonne Craig	Convention moves to new venue
November 24–25, 2001	Hilton Columbus Hotel at Easton Town Center	Dave Gibbons and John Byrne	
November 30–December 1, 2002	Hilton Columbus Hotel at Easton Town Center	June Lockhart, Yvonne Craig, Ted Raimi, Dick Giordano, Bob Layton, Mark Millar, Mark Evanier, Alan Burnett, Al Feldstein, Jon Provost, Roger Stern, Bob Ingersoll, Paul Jenkins, Len Wein, Marv Wolfman, Jan Duursema, Jeff Mariotte, Sergio Aragonés, Chuck Rozanski, Tony Isabella, Jeff Smith, David Yukovich, Farel Dalrymple	
November 29–30, 2003	Hilton Columbus Hotel at Easton Town Center	Mike W. Barr, Brian Michael Bendis, Kevin Eastman, Christopher Golden, David W. Mack, Sean McKeever, Jim Mooney, Michael Avon Oeming, Robin Riggs, Chris Sprouse, Mark Verheiden, Mark Wheatley, Mark Waid, and Matt Wagner. Media guests: Walter Koenig, Brad Dourif, Andy Hallett, David Carradine, Michael Jai White, Yvonne Craig, June Lockhart, and Kathy Garver	
November 27–28, 2004	Hilton Columbus Hotel at Easton Town Center	Sergio Aragonés, John Byrne, Talent Caldwell, Stan Goldberg, Marc Hempel, David W. Mack, Michael Avon Oeming, Jeff Smith, and Tom Batiuk	25th anniversary show; because of a problem with UPS, the program booklets (with cover art by Adam Hughes) didn't arrive in time for the convention
November 26–27, 2005	Hilton Columbus Hotel at Easton Town Center	Greg Horn, Bob Ingersoll, Matt Feazell, Art Baltazar	
November 25–26, 2006	Battelle Hall, Greater Columbus Convention Center	Herb Trimpe, Beau Smith, Dan Davis, Matt Webb, Darryl Banks, Paul Storrie	Convention moves to new, larger venue
November 24–25, 2007	Battelle Hall, Greater Columbus Convention Center	Special guest: Arthur Suydam; other guests: Doug Jones, Noel Neill, Mark Goddard, Raven, Sergio Aragonés, Matt Haley, Barry Kitson, David W. Mack, Tom Mandrake, Sean McKeever, Brian Pulido, and Steve Rude	
October 4–5, 2008	Battelle Hall, Greater Columbus Convention Center	Dan Mishkin, Chris Claremont, Alan Davis, Joe Kubert, Lou Ferrigno, Jason Mewes, Dick Ayers, Art Baltazar, Tobias S. Buckell, Chris Eliopoulos, Mark Evanier, Gary Friedrich, Mike Grell, Tony Isabella, David W. Mack, Bob McLeod, Steve Rude, P. Craig Russell, Roger Stern, Marc Sumerak, Arthur Suydam, Billy Tucci, Ethan Van Sciver, Len Wein, Marv Wolfman, and Bernie Wrightson	
October 3–4, 2009	Battelle Hall, Greater Columbus Convention Center	Beau Smith, Billy Tucci, Lora Innes, Gary Kwapisz, Ron Frenz, Tony Isabella, Maggie Thompson, Joe Jusko, Michael Golden, Darryl Banks, Jay Fife, Mike Grell, Fred Hembeck, Sean McKeever, Keith Pollard, Josef Rubinstein, P. Craig Russell, Len Wein, Marv Wolfman, Scott Kolins, and Chris Sprouse	
November 6–7, 2010	Battelle Hall, Greater Columbus Convention Center	Guests of honor: David Finch and Adam Hughes; special guest: Frank Cho; featured guests: Michael Berryman and Lou Ferrigno. Other guests: Kurt Busiek, Sergio Aragonés, Mark Texeira, Matt Wagner, Jamie Snell, Uko Smith, and Darryl Banks	30th anniversary show
October 22–23, 2011	Battelle Hall, Greater Columbus Convention Center, Columbus, Ohio	Headline guests: Adam West, Burt Ward, Rob Liefeld; other guests: David W. Mack, Bill Sienkiewicz, Jeff Smith, Arthur Suydam, Pasqual Ferry, Mike Grell, Greg Horn, Phil Jimenez, Michael Golden, Mark Texeira, Charles Skaggs, Chris Sprouse, Eric Wight, Eliza Frye, Steve Hamaker, Ed Piskor, Thomas Scioli, Marc Sumerak, Carol Tyler, and Ryan Ottley	
September 28–30, 2012	Battelle Hall, Greater Columbus Convention Center	Dean Cain, Lou Ferrigno, Jorge Molina, Greg Horn, Arthur Suydam, Mike McKone, Tom Batiuk, Chad Cicconi, Stuart Sayger, Eliza Dushku, Patrick Stewart, Dirk Strangely	Show renamed Wizard World Ohio Comic Con
September 20–22, 2013	Battelle Hall, Greater Columbus Convention Center	Sara Jean Underwood, Scott Wilson, Chandler Riggs, Michael Rooker, Norman Reedus, Linda Blair, Lou Ferrigno, Ernie Hudson, William Shatner, Stan Lee	
October 31–November 2, 2014	Battelle Hall, Greater Columbus Convention Center	Danny Fingeroth, Tony Isabella, Thom Zahler, Andrew Shaffer, Dace Acosta, David Aikins, Dirk Manning, Patrick and Shelly Block, Sandy Plunkett, Sean Forney, Victor Dandridge, Nicholas Brendon	Danny Fingeroth produced the comics panels
September 18–20, 2015	Battelle Hall, Greater Columbus Convention Center	Lou Ferrigno, Jason David Frank, Brad Guigar, Trevor A. Mueller, Michael Rooker, Sean Schemmel, William Shatner, Brent Spiner, Arthur Suydam	Show renamed Wizard World Columbus Comic Con
July 29–31, 2016	Battelle Hall, Greater Columbus Convention Center	Sam Ellis, Sean Forney, Michael Golden, Andrew Heath, Geof Isherwood, Guy Gilchrist, Dirk Manning, Phil Ortiz, C. S. Marks, James O'Barr, Stuart Sayger, Renée Witterstaetter	
August 4–6, 2017	Battelle Hall, Greater Columbus Convention Center	John Barrowman, Nicholas Brendon, Emma Caulfield, Tom Cook, Colleen Doran, Charles Dunbar, Lou Ferrigno, Elizabeth Henstridge, Kurt Lehner, Billy Martinez, Michelle Mussoni, Phil Ortiz, Ray Park, RealBreakingNate, SuperKayce, Catherine Tate, David Tennant, Ethan Van Sciver, Michael Wilson	
June 8–10, 2018	Battelle Hall, Greater Columbus Convention Center	Jason Momoa, John Cusack, Winston Duke, Mike Colter, Billy Boyd, John Barrowman, Matt Ryan, Jewel Staite, Sean Maher, Holly Marie Combs, Jon Heder, Ray Park, Daniel Logan, Henry Winkler, Kevin Sorbo, Charisma Carpenter, Thomas Ian Nicholas	Source:
October 18–20, 2019	Battelle Hall, Greater Columbus Convention Center	Drew Powell, David Ramsey, Michael Rosenbaum, Chris Sarandon, Laura Vandervoort, Tom Welling, Claudia Wells, Michael Wilson, Henry Winkler	Source:

== Events ==
Along with panels, seminars, and workshops with comic book professionals, there are portfolio review sessions with top comic book and video game companies, and such evening events as a costume contest. Traditional events include hours of programming on all aspects of comic books and pop culture. For many years, comics writer/editor Tony Isabella was the show's panel programming director.

A popular event for a number of years (c. 1995–2001) was the panel game show Comic Book Squares, based on Hollywood Squares. In Comic Book Squares, hosted by Joe Edkins, a group of comics industry "celebrities" sat in a squarish setting, answering comic book and guest-related trivia questions while contestants (selected members of the audience) won prizes.

Like most comic book conventions, the Ohio Comic Con features a large floorspace for exhibitors, including comic book dealers and collectibles merchants. The Ohio Comic Con includes an autograph area, as well as an Artists' Alley where comics artists (as well as writers, models, and celebrities) sign autographs and/or sell or do free sketches.

== Criticism ==
With the show's 2010 acquisition by Wizard Entertainment, according to comics writer Dara Naraghi, complaints arose almost immediately about the change in atmosphere. Whereas once the show was known as relaxed and congenial, and guests were easily accessible to fans, the Wizard-run show forged an aesthetic that Naraghi found to be louder, brasher, and more expensive. Writer J. J. Ulm of the Columbus Free Press had similar complaints about the 2014 show.

== In popular culture ==
Mid-Ohio Con founder Roger A. Price has appeared as a comic book character in Marvel Comics. In The Star Brand #12, written and penciled by frequent Mid-Ohio Con guest John Byrne, Price is introduced as a Red Cross worker (using a cane, married to Jane Price, and living in Mansfield, Ohio, as in real life) who also claims to be "director of the north central Ohio division of the March of Dimes" (a reference to the Mid-Ohio Con's ongoing support for the March of Dimes). The Price character dies in The Star Brand #14 but is later reborn as a temporary holder of the Star Brand. Altogether, the character appears in six issues of The Star Brand.

== See also ==
- Small Press and Alternative Comics Expo
