= Big Apple Comic Con =

New York City comics & pop culture convention

Coordinates: 40°45′02″N 73°59′34″W

Big Apple Comic Con (BACC)
- New York City's Original Comic Con
- Status: Active
- Genre: Comics; Popular culture
- Venue: New Yorker Hotel (2018–present); Penn Plaza Pavilion (2004–2018); Metropolitan Pavilion (2000–2003); St. Paul the Apostle Church (1996–2003)
- Locations: New York City, New York
- Country: United States
- Inaugurated: March 2, 1996
- Most recent: Mar. 25–26, 2023
- Next event: Nov 23, 2024
- Attendance: 8,000 (2018)
- Organizer: Michael Carbonaro (1996–2009); Wizard Entertainment (2009–2013), Big Apple CC Corp (2014 to present)
- Website: Official website

The Big Apple Comic Con is the longest-running comic book/speculative fiction/pop culture convention in New York City. It was started by retailer Michael "Mike Carbo" Carbonaro in March 1996 in the basement of the St. Paul the Apostle Church. Having grown out of the church, between 1999 and 2008, the Big Apple Comic Con often featured multiple shows per year, with a large three-day "national" convention held in November, at the Metropolitan Pavilion and later at the Penn Plaza Pavilion. The show was sold to Wizard Entertainment in 2009 but was reacquired 2014 by Big Apple CC Corp (owned in part by Mr.Carbonaro) in 2014. Mr. Carbonaro says Wizard could not produce a successful show in NYC.

Over the course of its history, the convention has been known as the Big Apple Convention, the Big Apple Comic Book Art, and Toy Show, and the Big Apple Comic Book, Art, Toy & Sci-Fi Expo; with the larger three-day November shows known as the National Comic Book, Art, Toy, and Sci-Fi Expo, the National Comic Book, Art, and Sci-Fi Expo, and the National Comic Book, Comic Art, and Fantasy Convention. In 2014, the name "Big Apple Comic Con" was revived by Mr. Carbonaro for its March 2015 show.

In 2018 the Big Apple Comic Con moved from the decaying Penn Plaza (last show 2018) to the recently renewed 1929 Art Deco masterpiece New Yorker Hotel (now the Wyndham hotel).

Though it primarily focuses on comic books, the convention features a large range of pop culture elements, such as graphic novels, cinema, science fiction/fantasy, television, animation, anime, manga, toys, horror, collectible card games, video games, webcomics, and fantasy novels. Along with panels, seminars, and workshops with comic book professionals, the Big Apple Comic Con often features previews of upcoming films, and such evening events as the costume contest hosted b y "Captain Zorikh" Lequidre.

The convention regularly hosts hundreds of artists, exhibitors, and film and television personalities in a huge floorspace for exhibitors. The show includes autograph and photo op opportunities with all of the guests, as well as the Artists' Alley where comics artists can sign autographs and sell their work.

== History ==
=== Antecedents ===
Major comic book conventions in New York City prior to the Big Apple Comic Con included Dave Kaler's Academy Con, which ran annually from 1965 to 1967; Phil Seuling's Comic Art Convention, which ran annually from 1968 to 1983 (Seuling died in 1984); and the large annual Creation conventions, usually taking place over the weekend following Thanksgiving from 1971 to 1987. (Creation sometimes put on as many as a half-dozen smaller New York City shows per year). From 1993 to 1995, promoter Frederic Greenberg began hosting Great Eastern Conventions shows annually at venues including the Jacob K. Javits Convention Center. (Great Eastern also ran shows in New Jersey, Pennsylvania, and Massachusetts.) Other companies, including Dynamic Forces, held New York City conventions, but all were on a smaller scale than the Seuling shows. Changes in the industry, popular culture, and the resurgent city itself since the troubled 1960s and '70s made large-scale comic-book conventions difficult to hold profitably.

=== Birth of the show ===
On February 29, 1996, just two days before it was to start, Fred Greenberg cancelled what had been advertised as a larger-than-usual Great Eastern show, scheduled for March 2–3 at the New York Coliseum, which the fan press had suggested might herald a successor to the 1968–1983 Comic Art Convention.

On the spur of the moment, comic book retailers Michael Carbonaro, Vince Gulla, and Vincent Zurzuolo, all of whom had planned to sell their wares at the Great Eastern show, mounted a substitute convention in the basement of the Church of St. Paul the Apostle. The gathering — dubbed "ChurchCon," "Hallelujah Con," or "The Show Must Go On" Con — attracted over 4,000 attendees, most of whom had been planning to attend the scheduled Great Eastern Show. Thus was born the Big Apple Comic Con, thereafter produced by Mr. Carbonaro.

=== Growth ===
After the success of the initial 1996 show, Big Apple scheduled six separate conventions in 1997.

In 1998, Big Apple held three conventions, in March, April, and October.

In November 1999, (after a typical March show held at the Church of St. Paul the Apostle), Big Apple inaugurated the three-day "National Expo", held at the Metropolitan Pavilion on West 18th Street in Manhattan. The National Expo brought "together the National Comic Book, Comic Art and Fantasy Convention and the New York Toy, Sci-Fi and Collectible Show;" the larger annual National shows were held every year from 1999 until 2008; other shows (until 2004) continued to be held at the Church of St. Paul the Apostle.

Over the years, the Big Apple con attracted many comics creators and pop culture figures.

=== Heyday ===
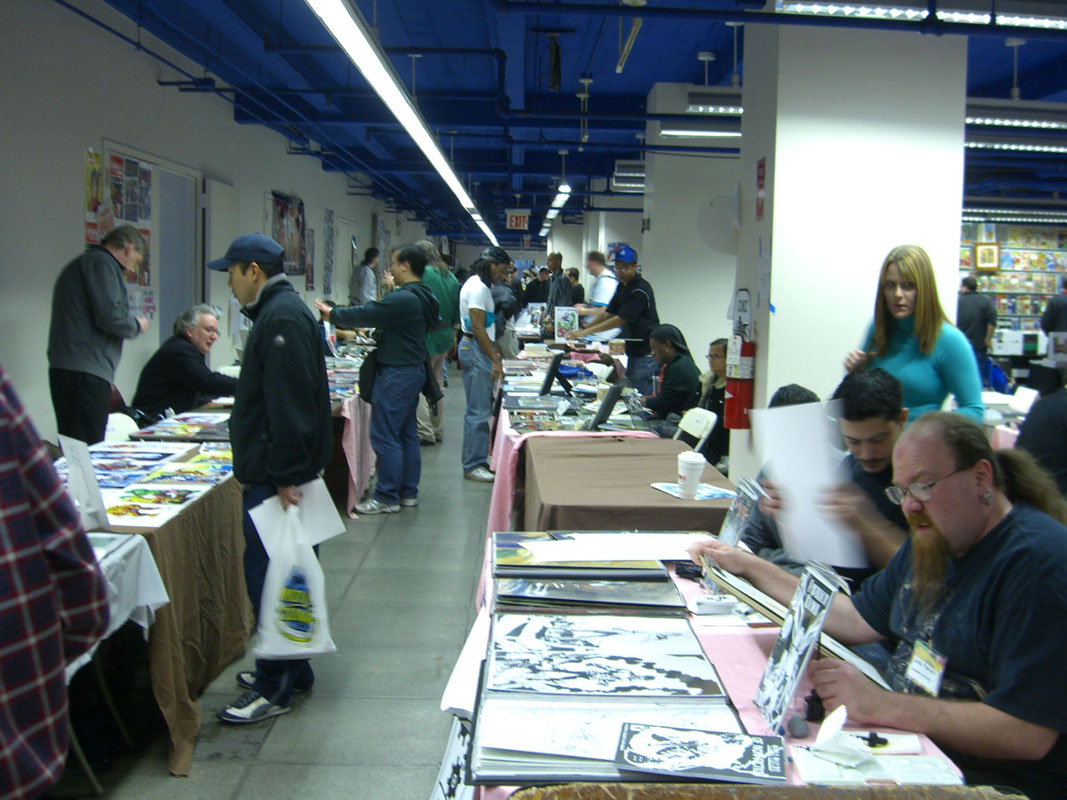
Big Apple Comic Con Artist Alley 2008

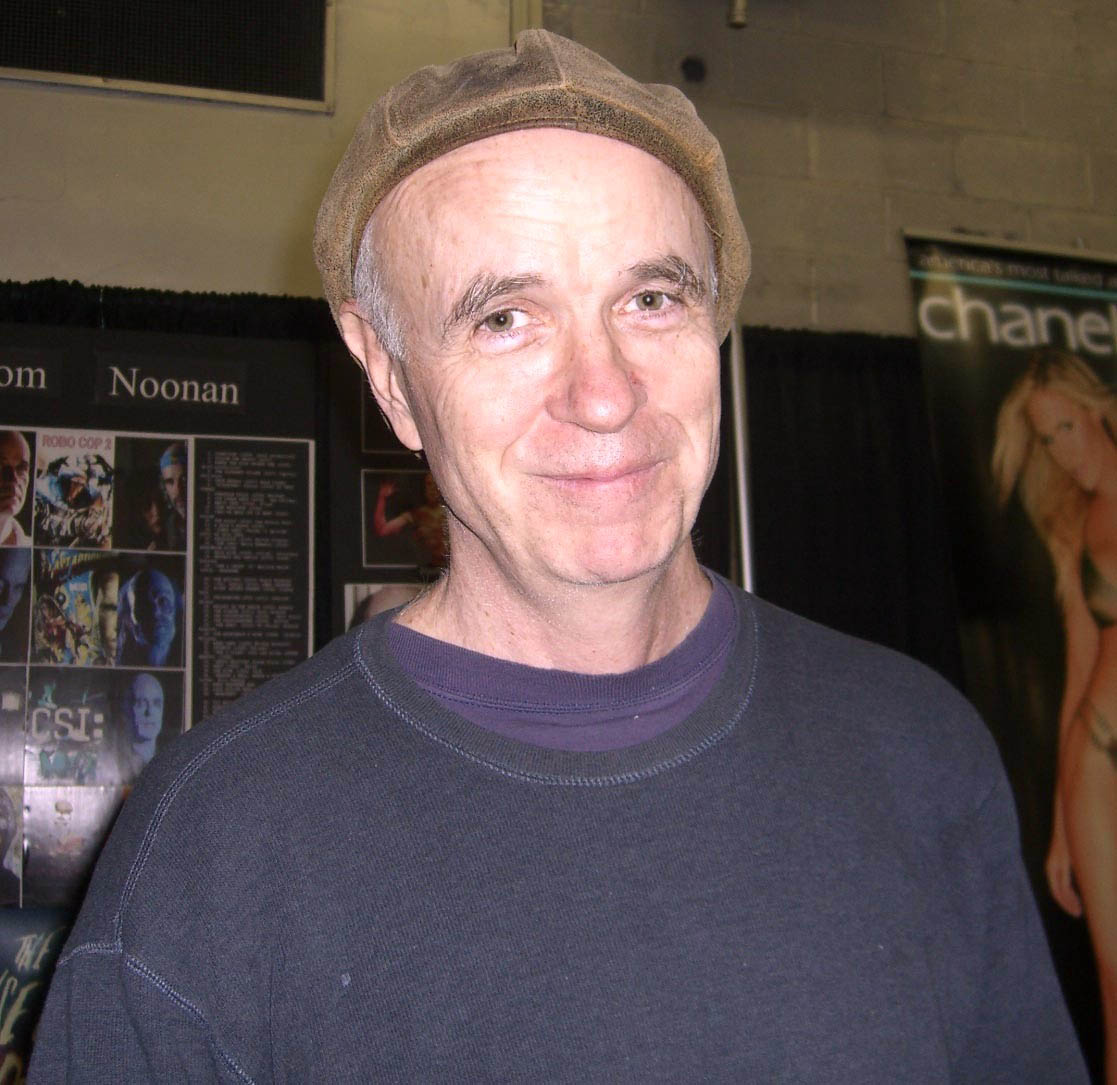
Tom Noonan at the Big Apple Comic Con, October 17, 2009

By 2004 (which saw four separate shows), the convention had moved to the Penn Plaza Pavilion at the Hotel Pennsylvania.

Big Apple Comic Con was characterized as being in "growth mode" in 2005–2006, with five shows per year and an average attendance of about 8,000 guests per show.

=== Acquisition by Wizard Entertainment ===
In 2009, the Big Apple Comic Con was purchased by Gareb Shamus of Wizard Entertainment; Michael Carbonaro was retained as a senior adviser. The first show under Wizard was held October 2009 at Pier 94 in Manhattan.

The acquisition of Big Apple Comic Con was part of a concerted push by Wizard's CEO Gareb Shamus to dominate the North American convention circuit, including acquiring the Paradise Comics Toronto Comicon. As part of that strategy, Wizard initially scheduled the 2010 Big Apple Comic Con for October 7–10, the exact same dates as the previously scheduled 2010 New York Comic Con, run by Reed Exhibitions. After a public outcry, Wizard later moved the dates of its 2010 New York convention to October 1–3.

Wizard held a new "Wizard World New York City Experience" show on June 28–30, 2013.

=== New York Comic Book Marketplace ===
In 2009, Michael Carbonaro established his own independent one-day convention known as the New York Comic Book Marketplace which ran annually through 2014.

Though not branded as a "Big Apple Convention" and not affiliated with Wizard World, some might consider the next iteration of the Big Apple Comic Con to have been held on March 31, 2012, at the Penn Plaza Pavilion. It was Michael Carbonaro's third New York Comic Book Marketplace, and (prematurely) announced as Carbonaro's final convention. The guest of honor was Stan Lee; other guests included George Pérez, Joe Sinnott, Dick Ayers, Carmine Infantino, Jim Steranko, Irwin Hasen, Mike Royer, Arthur Suydam, Bob McLeod, Rich Buckler, and Johnny Brennan, and Captain Zorikh's costume contest.

Mr. Carbonaro held another NYCBM at the Hotel Pennsylvania on April 13, 2013.

=== Reacquisition by Mike Carbonaro/Big Apple CC Corp (BACC) ===
Mr. Carbonaro, as front person for the newly formed Big Apple CC Corp reacquired the convention from Wizard in 2014. The first show after regaining the BACC name, dubbed the "20th Anniversary Return of the Big Apple Convention," was held March 7, 2015, at the Penn Plaza Pavilion. In December 2015, BACC partnered with Frank Patz to produce the New York Winter Comic & Sci-Fi Expo, was held at the Resorts World Casino New York in Jamaica, New York. (Note: By 2017, New York Comic Con, held annually at the Jacob K. Javits Convention Center, had grown to rival that of San Diego Comic-Con, making it the dominant New York City-area comic convention.)

With the holiday-themed December 2019 iteration of the show, the Big Apple Comic Con moved locations to the New Yorker Hotel. The 2020 show, scheduled for April 4–5, was canceled due to the COVID-19 pandemic. On July, 17th 2021 the BACC "25th Anniversary Prequel" was the first in-person comic convention held in New York City as it reopened after the pandemic, and September 25–26, the Big Apple Comic Con held its Silver Anniversary show;

Since post Covid 2012, now a fixture of the New Yorker Hotel, the BACC has hosted 5 events beginning March 26, 2022, an annual "Christmas Con" in December (in 2024 called "Holiday Con"), and (along with promoter Laz Rivero) the first Big Apple Trading Card Show, held on January 29, 2022, at the New Yorker Hotel. The trading card show featured baseball, football, basketball, Pokémon, Magic: The Gathering cards, and more.

== Criticism ==
Comics creator Evan Dorkin was a critic of the Big Apple Con. He singled out the November 2008 show in particular as "the worst convention I've ever had the displeasure to sit through", for the lackluster celebrity guests, the lack of floor plan guides for attendees, inconsistently-functioning restrooms, elevator, and escalators, the poorly performing volunteer staff, and an overall seedy, flea market atmosphere of rude dealers, creators inattentive to fans, and attendees who were disproportionately male. Dorkin, who vowed never to return to the venue, also singled out the cramped space of the venue, in particular Artist's Alley, which he speculated may have constituted a fire hazard.

Similarly, journalist Heidi MacDonald criticized the Penn Plaza Pavilion location as "eight pounds of sh-t in a five-pound bag." Journalist Rich Johnston said the conventions held there were "a little cramped and hot, but I still thoroughly enjoyed [them]."

Dorkin was describing his personal experience at an event in 2008, before the sale of the Big Apple Comic Convention to Wizard. Ms. MacDonald who is a great friend of the BACC, and a guest at the 2024 event, was describing the convention space, and how it was choking the potential of the show.

Mr. Carbonaro, who apologized to Mr. Dorkin at the time, has said that one of the key reasons for the sale to Wizard World was the lack of quality space available for comic book conventions in NYC, and issues with the management of the Penn Plaza.The return of the newly reformed BACC to the Penn Plaza in 2015 included the 18th floor of the Pennsylvania Hotel and a revamped relationship with Penn management. Still unsatisfied, the BACC had its first show in the New Yorker in 2017 and moved out of the Penn Plaza definitively in 2018.

Fans positive response to the BACC, offers a good idea of the excitement, fun, and intimate atmosphere of a comic convention that caters to contact and really having time to meet the guests. 82% of fan responses on the shows Facebook page are positive.

Roland Edwards writing on the BACC Facebook page in 2019: "I was impressed by how well big name guests like William Shatner and Kathleen Turner were treated...The venue is intimate and conveniently located near mass transit. The small staff of volunteers kept up with the demand. The vendors I spoke with at the end said they had a good show (made money)."

Dan Rovira, also on the BACC Facebook in 2019: "I have been going to the Big Apple Con for some 9 years and I have always found it to be terrific . . . the guest artists for comics are superb. I am looking forward this March to attend. I highly recommend this outstanding convention."

Tidarut Hansub-Udom in 2021 wrote: "It was my first time going and I had a lot of fun. Great vendors, artists, guests, panels and gaming area. Everyone is very friendly, which makes the environment more accepting for all attendees."

BACC's move to the New Yorker was a sea change for the event. Spacious, but intimate, scrupulously (Wyndham) clean the response from guests and audience has been overwhelmingly positive. Ming Chen, "I just love the Big Apple Comic Con," Jim Steranko a regular guest at the show since the days of St Paul's Church: "It is my favorite real comic con."

== Dates and locations ==
Year	Dates	Venue	Show Moniker	Official guests	Notes	Ref.
1996	March 2	St. Paul the Apostle Church	ChurchCon; Show Must Go On Con; Hallelujah Con			
1997	January	St. Paul the Apostle Church	Big Apple Comic Con			
1997	March	St. Paul the Apostle Church	Big Apple Comic Con			
1997	May	St. Paul the Apostle Church	Big Apple Comic Con			
1997	July	St. Paul the Apostle Church	Big Apple Comic Con			
1997	September	St. Paul the Apostle Church	Big Apple Comic Con			
1997	November	St. Paul the Apostle Church	Big Apple Comic Con			
1998	March	St. Paul the Apostle Church	Big Apple Comic Con	James Warren		
1998	April 4	St. Paul the Apostle Church	Big Apple Comic Book & Toy Convention	Al Williamson, Miran Kim	100 dealers; admission price $5	
1998	October 10					
1999						
1999	November 12–14	Metropolitan Pavilion	National Comic Book, Art, Toy, and Fantasy Convention		First "National Expo"; large animation auction held Nov. 12 to benefit the American Foundation for the Visual Arts	
2000	March					
2000	November 10–12	Metropolitan Pavilion	National Comic Book, Comic Art and Fantasy Convention	James Doohan, Jerome Blake, Ron Palillo, Apollo Smile, Richard Herd, Pamelyn Ferdin, Carmine Infantino, Jeff Jones, Erik Larsen, Russ Heath, Dick Giordano, Joe Simon, Julie Schwartz, Joe Giella, Frank McLaughlin, Michael Kaluta, Dave Cockrum, Paty Cockrum, Irwin Hasen, Glenn Fabry, John Romita Sr., Jimmy Palmiotti, Amanda Conner, Arnold Drake, Murphy Anderson, Gray Morrow, Mike Esposito, Tom Gill, Andrew Pepoy, Amanda Conner, Jimmy Palmiotti, Mark Texeira, David Wohl, Joseph Michael Linsner, William Tucci, Janet Lupo, Kevin Eastman, Sarah Dyer, Evan Dorkin, Don McGregor, Jim Shooter, Dan DeCarlo, George Tuska, Gill Fox, George Tuska, Graig Weich, Mercy Van Vlack, Ken Gale, Tim Vigil, David Quinn		
2001	January 20					
2001	March 9–10	St. Paul the Apostle Church Auditorium	Big Apple Comic Book, Art & Toy Show			
2001	July 6–7		Big Apple Comic Book, Art & Toy Show			
2001	~~September 14–15~~	~~St. Paul the Apostle Church Auditorium~~	~~Big Apple Comic Book, Art & Toy Show~~	~~Jeremy Bulloch, Ed Kemmer, Steve Rude, David W. Mack, Brian Michael Bendis, Joe Gill, Will Franz~~	Postponed due to September 11 attacks	
2001	October 12–13	St. Paul the Apostle Church Auditorium			Run as a charity to benefit victims of the September 11 attacks	
2001	November 9–11	Metropolitan Pavilion	National Comic Book, Art, Toy, and Sci-Fi Expo	Klaus Janson, Joe Staton, Trina Robbins, Jim Steranko, Jeff Smith, Jim Warren, Flo Steinberg, Herb Trimpe, Linda Fite, Walter Simonson, Louise Simonson, Tim Vigil	Proceeds donated to the World Trade Center Fund.	
2002	January 19			Guy Gilchrist, Ethan Van Sciver, Bill Plympton, Irwin Hasen, Dick Ayers, The Iron Sheik, April Hunter, Wagner Brown, Tammy Lynn Sytch, Chris Candido, Virgil		
2002	July 12–13					
2002	September 13–14		Big Apple Comic Book Art and Toy Show			
2002	November 8–10	Metropolitan Pavilion	National Comic Book, Comic Art, and Fantasy Convention	Nichelle Nichols, Sarah Douglas, Sergio Aragonés, Jim Lee, Gene Colan, Nutopia, Sam Kieth, Michael Kaluta, Brian Michael Bendis, David W. Mack, Joe Jusko, Andy Lee, Tim Vigil, Graig F. Weich	First annual Golden Panel Awards for Excellence in Comic Book Art and Story Telling (sponsored by the New York City Comic Book Museum); close to 6,000 attendees	
2003	January 25					
2003	April 6					
2003	May 2–3	St. Paul the Apostle Church Auditorium	Big Apple Comic Book Art, and Toy Show	Jim Steranko (guest of honor), Russ Heath, Billy Tucci, Graig Weich, Tony Isabella, Guy Gilchrist, Jim Krueger, Jamal Igle, Robin Riggs, Jim Salicrup		
2003	July 25–26					
2003	September 5–6					
2003	November 28–30	Metropolitan Pavilion	National Comic Book, Comic Art, and Fantasy Convention			
2004						
2004	November 19–21	Penn Plaza Pavilion	National Comic Book, Comic Art, and Fantasy Convention	Jim Starlin, Neal Adams, Adam Hughes, Bill Sienkiewicz, Jim Krueger, Roy Thomas, Jim Shooter, Michael Kaluta, Joseph Michael Linsner, Jim Califiore, Ramona Fradon, Michael Avon Oeming, Tom Raney, Rick Leonardi, Howard Chaykin, Tom Palmer, Anthony Schiavino, Joe Staton, Dave Roman, John Green, Andy McDonald, Ivan Brandon, Peter Kuper, Seth Tobocman, Robin Riggs, Elayne Riggs, Neil Vokes, Bob Tinnell, Dave DeVries, John Workman, Rudy Nebres, Tommy Castillo, Irwin Hasen, Rich Buckler		
2005	January 22–23	Penn Plaza Pavilion	Big Apple Comic Book, Art, and Toy Show	Bill Sienkiewicz, Joe Simon, Carmine Infantino , Kevin Eastman, Simon Bisley, Larry Lieber, Terry Dodson, Aaron Lopresti, Michael Lark, Billy Tucci, J. G. Jones, Dean Haspiel, Mike Bair	Sunday art auction to benefit the American Red Cross	
2005	April 1–3	Penn Plaza Pavilion	Big Apple Comic Book, Art, and Toy Show	Maureen Shea		
2005	June 18–19	Penn Plaza Pavilion	Big Apple Comic Book, Art, and Toy Show	Fred Hembeck		
2005	September 10–11	Penn Plaza Pavilion	The Big Apple Con: Comic Book, Art and Toy Show		Focus on American war comics. 12,000 attendees; 300 exhibitors.	
2005	November 18–20	Penn Plaza Pavilion	National Comic Book, Comic Art, and Fantasy Convention	Richard Hatch	10th annual National show	
2006					"One-Day Wonder"	
2006	February 24–26			UDON artist collective, including Alvin Lee and Jim Zub		
2006	March 31–April 2	Penn Plaza Pavilion	Big Apple Comic Book, Art, and Toy Show	Margot Kidder		
2006	November 17–19	Penn Plaza Pavilion	Big Apple National Comic Book Convention	Roger Hill, Catherine Bach		
2007	January 19–20	Penn Plaza Pavilion	Big Apple Comic Book, Art & Toy Expo	Comics guests: Seth Tobocman, James Romberger, Alex Maleev, Alex Saviuk, Arnold Drake, Mac McGill, Bill Sienkiewicz, Dan Slott, Danny Fingeroth, Dennis Calero, Dick Ayers, Fred Harper, Guy Dorian, Guy Gilchrist, Ian Dorian, Irwin Hasen, Ivan Brandon, Ivan Velez, Jamal Igle, Jim Kyle, Jennifer Camper, Jim Salicrup, Jim Sherman, Ken Gale, Mark Texeira, Mercy Van Vlack, Michael Avon Oeming, Rich Buckler, Sean Chen, and Tommy Castillo	Fan Appreciation show with free admission to celebrate Big Apple's 10th anniversary	
2007	November 16–18	Penn Plaza Pavilion	National Comic Book, Art, Toy & Sci-Fi Expo	Comics guests: Adam Hughes, Alan Kupperberg, Alan Weiss, Alex Maleev, Alex Saviuk, Amanda Conner, Bernard Chang, William Tucci, Bob Hall, Bob Layton, Bob McLeod, Carmine Infantino, Chris Moreno, Darwyn Cooke, Dan Slott, Danny Fingeroth, Dennis Calero, Dick Ayers, Elayne Riggs, Frank Cho, Gary Friedrich, Graig Weich, Guy Dorian, Herb Trimpe, Ian Dorian, Irwin Hasen, Ivan Brandon, Joe Sinnott, Jim Steranko, John Romita Sr, Jim Calafiore, Jimmy Palmiotti, Jim Salicrup, Ken Gale, Ken Kelly, Kim Deitch, Kyle Baker, Mark Bodé, Mark Evanier, Mark Texeira, Mercy Van Vlack, Michael Gaydos, Michael Golden, Michael Netzer, Neal Adams, Norm Breyfogle, Paolo Rivera, William Foster III, Rich Buckler, Robin Riggs, Ron Garney, S. Clay Wilson, Sean Chen, Sergio Aragonés, Spain Rodriguez, Tim Sale, Tim Vigil, and Tom Feister		
2008	June 7–8	Penn Plaza Pavilion	Big Apple Comic Book, Art & Toy Expo	Richard Dreyfuss, Malcolm McDowell, Ice-T, Coco Austin, Doug Jones, Jason Mewes, Dana Kimmel, Paul Kratka, Larry Zerner, David Katims, Catherine Parks, Tracie Savage, Annie Gaybis, Tony Moran, Warrington Gillette, Kathryn Leigh Scott, Jasmin St. Claire, Monique Dupree, David Zen Mansley, Adrian Barrios, Alex Maleev, Andy MacDonald, Anthony Cacioppo, Arthur Suydam, Bernie Wrightson, William Tucci, Brian C. Kong, Buzz, Danny Fingeroth, Ed Coutts, Gene Ha, Guy Dorian, Guy Gilchrist, Ian Dorian, Irwin Hasen, Ivan Brandon, Joe Giella, John Cebollero, Marcus Boas, Mark Sable, Mark Texeira, Michael Avon Oeming, Mike Lilly, Patrick Gleeson, Paul Azaceta, Primo, Rich Buckler, Richard Howell, Rob Granito, Rodney Ramos, Steve Mannion, Steve Walker, Taki Soma, Tommy Castillo	"Summer Sizzler"	
2008	November 14–16	Penn Plaza Pavilion	National Big Apple Comic Book, Art, Toy, & Sci-Fi Expo	Comics guests: Neal Adams, Brian Michael Bendis, Ivan Brandon, Rich Buckler, Evan Dorkin, Mark Evanier, Danny Fingeroth, Joe Giella, Basil Gogos, Michael Golden, Gene Ha, Irwin Hasen, Carmine Infantino, Alex Maleev, Michael Avon Oeming, Robin Riggs, John Romita, Jr., Walt Simonson, Jim Steranko, Bryan Talbot, Mark Texeira, William Tucci, Bernie Wrightson; celebrity guests: George Lazenby, Peter Mayhew, Kate Mulgrew		
2009						
2009	October 16–18	Pier 94	Wizard World Big Apple Comic Con	Jim Lee (co-Guest of Honor), Joe Quesada (co-Guest of Honor), Tom Noonan, Dan Parent; celebrity guest: William Shatner	First iteration of the show under Wizard Entertainment	
2010	February 27	Penn Plaza Pavilion	New York Comic Book Marketplace	Herb Trimpe, Michael Golden, Tony Robinson, Irwin Hasen, Mark Texeira, Gene Colan, J. H. Williams III, Dan Slott, Larry Hama, Billy Tucci, Bill Sienkiewicz, Chris Claremont, Cliff Chiang, Jim Starlin, Matt Clark, Sean Chen, Dick Ayers, Trevor Von Eeden, Mike Lilly, Brian Kong, Renée Witterstaetter, Janet Jackson, Stu Suchit, John Cebollero, Jorge Gonzalez, Bob Wiacek, Mark Romanoski, Scott Roberts, Danny Fingeroth, Rudy Nebres, Rodney Ramos, Steve Mannion, Ian Dorian, Guy Dorian, Khary Randolph	Originally scheduled to be held at the 69th Regiment Armory	
2010	October 1–3	Penn Plaza Pavilion	Big Apple Comic Con		Convention returns to the newly renovated Penn Plaza Pavilion	
2011	May 21–22	Penn Plaza Pavilion	Wizard World Big Apple Comic Con	Neal Adams, Nick Abadzis, Kaare Andrews, Matt Kindt, Percy Carey, Kevin Colden, Jared Fletcher, Michael Kupperman, Jason Little, Mark Morales, Laurie Sandell, Yuko Shimizu, Ronald Wimberly, Brian Wood, Arthur Suydam, Jerry Robinson, Luke Ross, Greg Horn, Christos Gage, Ryan Ottley, Alex Saviuk		
2012	March 31	Penn Plaza Pavilion	New York Comic Book Marketplace	Guest of honor: Stan Lee; other guests: George Pérez, Joe Sinnott, Dick Ayers, Carmine Infantino, Jim Steranko, Irwin Hasen, Mike Royer, Arthur Suydam, Bob McLeod, Rich Buckler, Johnny Brennan	Third NYCBM, announced as Carbonaro's final convention (although this was not actually the case); Captain Zorikh's costume contest	
2013	April 13	Penn Plaza Pavilion	New York Comic Book Marketplace	Special guest: George Pérez		
2013	June 28–30	Basketball City (Pier 36)	Wizard World New York City Experience	Julie Bell, Mike Deodato, Jr., Stan Lee, Carlos Pacheco, Humberto Ramos, Paolo Rivera, Arthur Suydam, Boris Vallejo	Focused on "celebrities, creators, sports stars, music, exhibitors, parties and other attractions" — very little comics content	
2014	March 1		New York Comic Book Marketplace		Final NYCBM before Carbonaro re-acquired the BACC name	
2015	March 7	Penn Plaza Pavilion		Comics guests: Herb Trimpe, Rich Buckler, Sean Chen, Tom DeFalco, Danny Fingeroth, Ramona Fradon, Larry Hama, Brian Kong, Justin Leiter, and Bob Rozakis; celebrity guests: Roddy Piper and Jake "The Snake" Roberts, Jason David Frank, Steve Cardenas, Ming Chen, Mike Zapcic, and Johnny Brennan	First show after Carbonaro re-acquired the BACC name; dubbed "20th Anniversary Return of the Big Apple Convention"	
2015	December 5–6	Resorts World Casino New York	New York Winter Comic & Sci-Fi Expo (a.k.a. New York Winter Con 2015)	Comics guests: John Cassaday, Dave Dorman; celebrity guests: Jeremy Bulloch, Daniel Logan, Nichelle Nichols, Austin St. John, Michael Biehn, Mick Foley, King Kong Bundy, Tito Santana	Co-produced by Frank Patz and Michael Carbonaro	
2016	March 5	Penn Plaza Pavilion	Big Apple Con	Neal Adams, Jason David Frank, Kathy Garver, Erik Larsen, Joseph Michael Linsner, James O'Barr, Karyn Parsons, Lori Petty, Laurence Mason, Johnny Brennan, Mark Texeira		
2017	March 11–12	Penn Plaza Pavilion	Big Apple Comic Con	Jim Lee, Neal Adams, Jon Bernthal, Guy Dorian, Jason David Frank, Kathy Garver, Michael Golden, Neil Kaplan, Frank Miller, Arthur Suydam, Mark Texeira, Billy Tucci, Spencer Wilding, Renée Witterstaetter	Stan Lee cancelled scheduled appearance due to illness	
2018	April 14–15	Penn Plaza Pavilion	Big Apple Comic Con	Nicholas Brendon, Jennifer Cihi, Michael Copon, Peter David, Michael Golden, Toshio Maeda, Jim Steranko, Arthur Suydam, Billy Tucci, Renée Witterstaetter, John Cassaday, Joe Giella, Ramona Fradon, Mike Royer		
2019	March 9–10	Penn Plaza Pavilion	Big Apple Comic Con	Celebrity guests: William Shatner, Mike Colter, Kathleen Turner, Brent Spiner, Chris Rankin, John O'Hurley, Mary Wilson, David Gerrold, Ann Robinson, Jason Liles, Richard Dorton, Alan Maxson, T. J. Storm, Gigi Edgley, Geoffrey Cantor, Debbie Rochon, Dave Madison, The Amazing Kreskin. Comics guests: Frank Cho, Tony Isabella, Jim Steranko, Bill Griffith, Jae Lee, Diane Noomin, Arvell Jones, Mark Texeira, Dan Nokes, Larry Welz, Robert J. Sodaro, Peter Bagge, Joe Martino, Ramona Fradon, Reilly Brown, Adam Air Williams, Peter David, Sy Barry, John Orlando, Brian Kong, Bob Camp, J. David Spurlock, Timothy Truman, Larry Nemecek, Danny Fingeroth, James Sherman, Sean Chen, Jim Salicrup, Mike Diana, Cristian Aluas, Rodney Ramos, Keith Williams, Larry Stroman, Dan Fogel		
2019	December 14	New Yorker Hotel	BACC Christmas Con	Comics guests Jim Steranko, Paul Levitz, Neal Adams, Erica Schultz, Billy Tucci, Larry Hama, Joseph Michael Linsner, Mark Texeira, Tom DeFalco, Bob Rozakis, Paul Kupperberg, Michael Jan Friedman, Peter Kuper, Paris Cullins, Gary Cohn, Larry Stroman, Bob Wiacek, Mike Diana, Zorikh Lequidre, John Orlando, and the Kubert School; celebrity guests Sam J. Jones, Peter Scolari, Barbie Chula (Cosplay Guest of Honor)	First Big Apple con at the New Yorker Hotel	
2020	April 4–5	New Yorker Hotel	Big Apple Comic Con		Cancelled due to COVID-19 pandemic	
2021	September 25–26	New Yorker Hotel	Big Apple Comic Con	Comics guests: Jim Starlin, Jim Steranko, Marat Mychaels, Billy Tucci, Amanda Conner, Jimmy Palmiotti, Keith Williams; celebrity guest: Jason David Frank	Silver Anniversary show	
2022	March 26	New Yorker Hotel	Big Apple Comic Con	Comics guests: Esad Ribić, Michael E. Uslan, Jamal Igle, James Sherman, Erica Schultz, Khoi Pham; celebrity guests: Melissa Roxburgh, Shantel VanSanten, Cerina Vincent, Michelle Harrison, Maiara Walsh, Katie Barberi, Craig Hurley		
2023	December 16	New Yorker Hotel	3rd Annual BACC Christmas Con	Comics guests: Jim Steranko, Larry Hama, Jim Rugg, Ed Piskor, Billy Tucci, Alitha Martinez, Paul Kirchner, Ken Landgraf, Keith Williams, Sean Chen, Lou Manna, Mahdi Khene, Peter Kuper, Nick Virella, Brian Kong, Captain Zorikh, Dan Parent, Jennifer Hernandez, Kristen Gudsnuk, Tony Waldman; celebrity guest: Mike Vallely		

== See also ==
- List of comic book conventions
