= Comicpalooza =

Science fiction convention held in Houston, Texas

- Status: Active
- Venue: George R. Brown Convention Center
- Location: Houston, Texas
- Country: United States
- Inaugurated: 2008
- Attendance: 50,778 in 2018
- Website: https://www.comicpalooza.com

Comicpalooza is a large annual, multi-genre, comic book, science fiction, anime, gaming, and pop culture convention in the Southern United States and is held in Houston, Texas. The event is organized by John Simons, the originator of the event along with Startling Events, LLC. The event hosts the annual Comicpalooza Fandom Awards. It is the third largest Houston-based organized event behind Houston Rodeo and Houston Pride.

== History ==
=== 2008 ===
The first Comicpalooza was held July 19, 2008. The event took place in the lobby of the Alamo Drafthouse Cinema located in Houston, and corresponded with the release of the film The Dark Knight. The event included a handful of tables with local comic book artists.

=== 2009 ===
In 2009, Comicpalooza expanded to a two-day event which took place at West Oaks Mall. Question and answer sessions and a charity live art auction were added to the event. Guests included: David Mack, Terry Moore, Steve Scott, Tom Hodges, Mat Johnson, Andy Kuhn, and Dirk Strangely.

=== 2010 ===
In 2010, Comicpalooza expanded to a three-day event, taking place at the George R. Brown Convention Center attracting over 3,000 attendees the previous year. The event no longer focused exclusively on comics, but expanded to include science fiction, fantasy, horror, steam punk and other genres. During this year, the convention was held on the 2nd floor of the George R. Brown, in the smallest middle section of the convention center. In addition to Q&A sessions and the live art auction, Comicpalooza hosted celebrity guests, a three-day film festival, costume contest, live DJ room, cockpit simulators from MechCorps Entertainment LLC of the BattleTech Centers, and a $5,000 Magic: The Gathering tournament in addition to opening gaming and numerous panels by fan groups. The event also included a performance by the Intergalactic Nemesis Live-Action Graphic Novel and touring music act Dead P.A. Guests included: Bruce Campbell, Ray Park, Nicholas Brendon, Peter Mayhew, Jason Dohring, Francis Capra, Dichen Lachman, Phil Foglio, David Malki, R. K. Milholland, Brian Denham, Larry Elmore, Rob Liefeld, David Mack, Jim Mahfood, Humberto Ramos, Dirk Strangely, Ben Templesmith, Ethan Van Sciver, Bernie Wrightson, and others.

=== 2011 ===
Comicpalooza 2011 was held May 27–29, and featured a Zombie theme and an Anime component for the first time. With the previous years turnout, the convention expanded to two bigger halls on the 3rd floor. That year presented new features, including Houston Roller Derby, Local Wrestling, the International Quidditch Association, and local fan groups of the presented genres. Guests included Edward James Olmos, Meaghan Rath, Sam Trammell, Jeff Hughes, Arthur Suydm, Alejandro Garza, Jon Hughes, and much more. Fan groups included the Houston Area Ghost Busters, the Star Garrison of the 501st Legion, and the Texas Lego users group, which displayed a variety of unique variety of never before seen Lego items. Attendance was roughly 10,000.

=== 2012 ===
Comicpalooza 2012 was held on May 25–27, 2012. Guests included Kristin Bauer, Michael Biehn, Jennifer Blanc, Julie Caitlin Brown, Larry Wade Carrell, Claudia Christian, David Della Rocco, Sean Patrick Flanery, Nick Gillard, Britt Griffith, Richard Hatch, Dylan Horne, Ernie Hudson.

=== 2013 ===
Comicpalooza 2013 was held on May 24–26, 2013. It was the year it made media history that was featured in numerous publications all over the world for the Guest panel featuring Sir Patrick Stewart and his emotional response to a question by a fan regarding domestic violence. Other guests included Michael Golden, Scott Steiner, Danny Trejo, Tom Kane, Benjamin Percy, Rachel Caine, Joseph Gatt, Michelle Rodriguez, Armin Shimerman, Rene Auberionois, Avery Brooks, Kris Holden-Ried, Zoie Palmer, Sam Huntington, Tabith St. Germain, Andrea Libman, Craig Parker, Richard Horvitz, Bernie Wrightson, Abney Park, Alan Dean Foster, George Perez, Jacqueline Carey, Chris Claremont, Julie Bell, Boris Vallejo.

=== 2014 ===
Comicpalooza 2014 was held on May 23–26, 2014. Guests included Jason Mewes, Stan Lee, Jim Cummings, Rose McGowan, Peter Davison, Agents of S.H.I.E.L.D. cast: Clark Gregg, Elizabeth Henstridge, Brett Dalton, Ming-Na Wen, as well as Jim Steranko, Austin St. John, Davis Yost, Bret Hart, Kevin Nash, Johnny Yong Bosch, John Barrowman, Paul McGann, Sylvester McCoy, Colin Baker, Tony Lee, Lou Ferrigno, Tricia Helfer, John Scalzi, Kevin J. Anderson, and Ksenia Solo.

=== 2015 ===
Comicpalooza 2015 was held on May 22–25, 2015. Guests included Rosario Dawson, Chloe Bennet, NASA astronaut Stan Love, as well as Summer Glau, Gwar, David Ellefson, Marky Ramone, Jason Isaacs, Sting (Wrestler), Ramond E. Feist, Henry Winkler, as well as the cast of "Gotham": Cory Michael Smith, Cameron Monaghan, Sean Pertwee, Camren Bicondova, Donal Logue. Also featured were Mercedes Lackey, Larry Dixon, Walt Simonson, Louise Simonson, Rachel Caine, Linda Blair, George Takei, Stan Lee, Tuatha Dea, Laurie Holden, Jeff Smith, Jonathan Maberry, "Rowdy" Roddy Piper, Kevin Eastman, Peter David, Simon Bisley, Katie Cook, and Basil Gogos.

=== 2016 ===
In 2016, Comicpalooza hit another milestone. As one of Houston's leading destinations, Comicpalooza bridged a deeper partnership with the Greater Houston Convention & Visitors Bureau. Comicpalooza 2016 was held on June 17–19, 2016. Guests included Kate Beckinsale, Lou Ferrigno, The Boondocks Saints' stars Norman Reedus, Sean Patrick Flannery, David Della Rocco, Clifton Collins Jr., and Brian Mahoney. Others included Ric Flair, Eliza Dushku, Kel Mitchell, Dead 7's Chris Kirkpatrick, A.J. McLean, Jeff Timmons, Eric-Michael Estrada. Also featured were Charlie Hunnam, Lennie James, Dominic Cooper, Fear Factory's Burton C. Bell and Dino Cazares, Star Wars alumni Peter Mayhew and David Prowse, Walter Koenig, as well as the cast of Aliens reunion: Sigourney Weaver, Bill Paxton, Paul Reiser, Michael Biehn, Carrie Henn and Mark Rolston.

=== 2020 ===
The 13th annual event was cancelled and deferred to 2021 as the COVID-19 pandemic was to blame.

== Comicpalooza with anime, manga, video games, cosplay and Japanese culture ==
Comicpalooza has featured Anime for the first time in the convention and was held May 27–29, 2011 at George R. Brown Convention Center in Houston. Guests included: Leraldo Anzaldua, Maggie Flecknoe, Tiffany Grant, Josh Grelle, Taylor Hannah, Samantha Inoue-Harte, Brittney Karbowski, Mark Laskowski, Monica Rial, Claire Hamilton, Richard Steven Horvitz, and Veronica Taylor. In 2016, Comicpalooza has featured Japanese street fashion for the first time to increase more attendees who are interested in J-Fashion.

=== Event history ===
Dates	Location	Atten.	Guests
May 27–29, 2011	George R. Brown Convention Center; Houston, Texas	10,000	Leraldo Anzaldua, Maggie Flecknoe, Tiffany Grant, Josh Grelle, Taylor Hannah, Happy! Project, NekoNeko Maid and Host Club, Samantha Inoue-Harte, Tom Kane, Brittney Karbowski, Mark Laskowski, Jace Moore, Edward James Olmos, Monica Rial, Rosearik Rikki Simons, TWABI Productions, and Twinzik.
May 25–27, 2012	George R. Brown Convention Center; Houston, Texas	11,000	Tiffany Grant, Claire Hamilton, Richard Steven Horvitz, Samantha Inoue-Harte, and Veronica Taylor.
May 24–26, 2013	George R. Brown Convention Center; Houston, Texas	20,700	René Auberjonois, Robert Axelrod, Kimberly Balduf, Katherine Catmull, Chris Claremont, Josh Grelle, Barbara Goodson, Claire Hamilton, Richard Steven Horvitz, Samantha Inoue-Harte, Tom Kane, Andrea Libman, Lana Marie, Marie Doll, Ginny McQueen, Nicole Marie Jean, Spike Spencer, Patrick Stewart, and Tabitha St. Germain.
May 23–26, 2014	George R. Brown Convention Center; Houston, Texas	33,000	Ani-Mia, Kimberly Balduf, Johnny Yong Bosch, Chris Carlisle, Jim Cummings, Ivy Doomkitty, Cary Elwes, Todd Haberkorn, Claire Hamilton, Chuck Huber, Samantha Inoue-Harte, Hiroshi Kumada, Stan Lee, Lana Marie, James Marsters, Marie Doll, Nicole Marie Jean, Brandy Nikole, Rosanna Rocha, Tony Salvaggio, Kazuko Shimizu, Jonathan Tarbox, Veronica Taylor, Kenichiro Tomiyasu, and Ming-Na Wen.
May 22–25, 2015	George R. Brown Convention Center; Houston, Texas	42,000	Ani-Mia, Leraldo Anzaldua, Christopher Ayres, Greg Ayres, Kimberly Balduf, Bellechere, Charles Brownstein, Chris Carlisle, Peter David, Ivy Doomkitty, Kevin Eastman, Joe Grisaffi, Brad Hawkins, Matt Hawkins, Kyle Hebert, Jason Isaacs, Samantha Inoue-Harte, Roger L. Jackson, Hiroshi Kumada, Stan Lee, Andrew Love, Mariedoll, Shinji Nishikawa, Kazuko Shimizu, Dana Snyder, Jonathan Tarbox, Akira Takarada, Lisle Wilkerson, and Woody and Shay.
June 17–19, 2016	George R. Brown Convention Center; Houston, Texas	43,800	Baby, the Stars Shine Bright, Joe Casey, Katherine Catmull, Chokelate, Becky Cloonan, Jordan Cweirz, Holly Gloha, Joe Grisaffi, Gray G. Haddock, Matt Hawkins, Chuck Huber, Samantha Inoue-Harte, Joe Kelly, Miles Luna, Man of Action Studios, Lana Marie, Rachael Messer, Rob Mungle, Alan Oppenheimer, Otaku Acoustic, Rin-chan, Duncan Rouleau, Rooster Teeth, Steven T. Seagle, Kerry Shawcross, Rosearik Rikki Simons, Top Cow Productions, Twinzik, Kumiko Uehara, and Lisle Wilkerson.
May 12–14, 2017	George R. Brown Convention Center; Houston, Texas	45,377	Amouranth, Rodger Bumpass, Camilla d'Errico, Bill Fagerbakke, Jason David Frank, Caitlynn French, Samantha Inoue-Harte, Lance Henriksen, Chuck Huber, Tom Kenny, Josh Martin, Otaku Acoustic, Azure Props, Chris Rager, Tyson Rinehart, Christy Carlson Romano, Tony Salvaggio, Ian Sinclair, Christian Svensson, Top Cow Productions, Ryan "The Tentacle Guy" Worthington, and Yoshi Yoshitani.
May 25–27, 2018	George R. Brown Convention Center; Houston, Texas	50,778	Akrcos, Ani-Mia, Dante Basco, Michael Chiklis, Cowbutt Crunchies, Egg Sisters, Fighting Dreamers Production, Matt Frank, Sanford Greene, Joe Grisaffi, Tom Holland, Charlie Cox, Krysten Ritter, Brittney Karbowski, Jamie Marchi, Becka Noel, Philip Odango/Canvas Cosplay, and Ray Park.
May 10–12, 2019	George R. Brown Convention Center; Houston, Texas	45,923	Emilia Clarke, Avantgeek, Linda Ballantyne, Andrew Bryniarski, Chris Claremont, Michael Dorn, Dax ExclamationPoint, Carlos Ferro, Matt Frank, Josh Grelle, Katie Griffin, Jess Harnell, Matt Hawkins, Brittney Karbowski, Maurice LaMarche, Inspector Lemon Cosplay, Tress MacNeille, Jamie Marchi, Paul Nakauchi, Becka Noel, Rob Paulsen, Jack Rabid, Monica Rial, Peter Serafinowicz, J. Michael Tatum, Alexis Tipton, and Uptown Cosplay.
