= Gareb Shamus =

American publisher

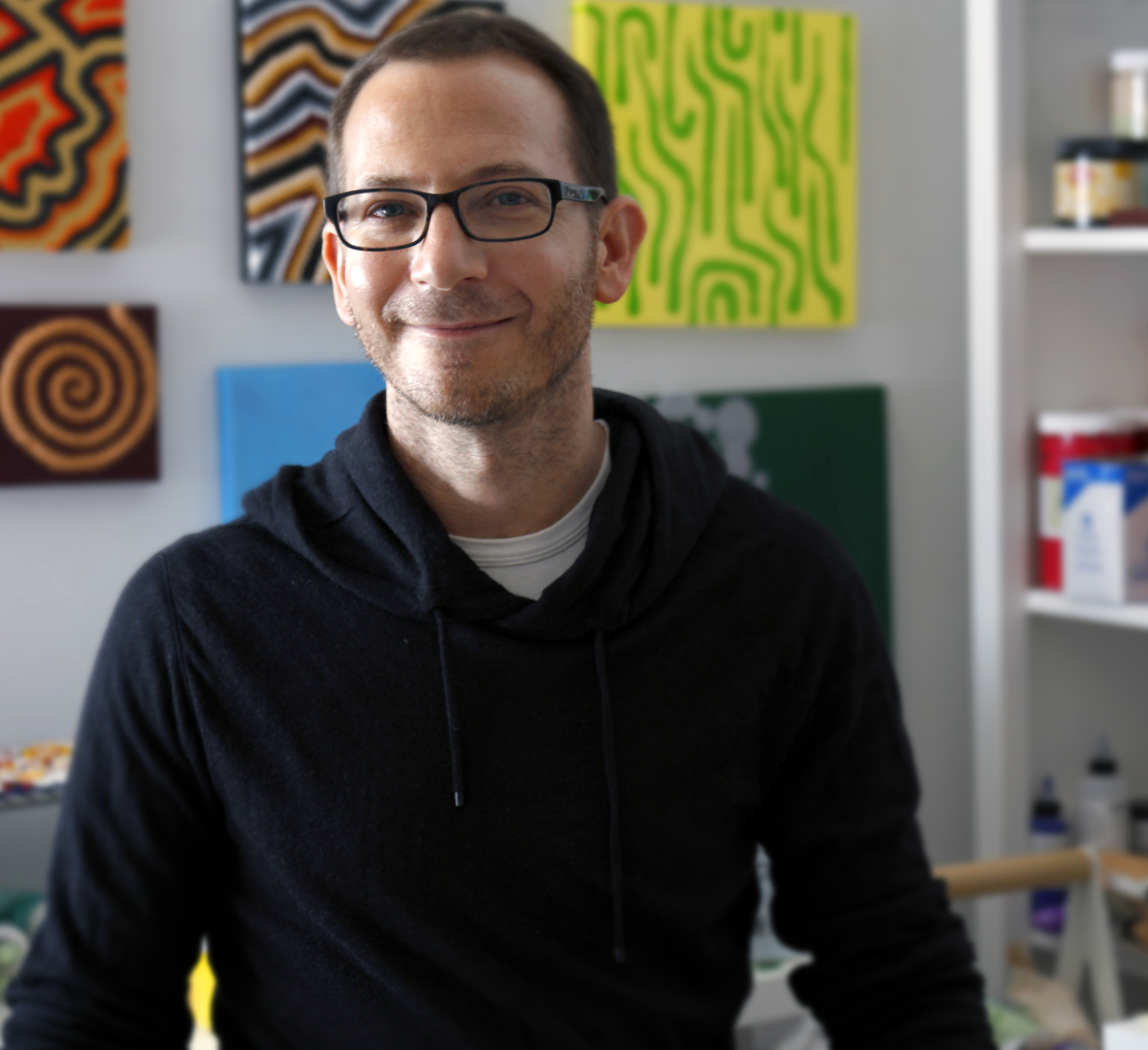
- Born: Gareb Seth Shamus; December 23, 1968 (age 57) New York City, U.S.
- Areas: Painter, entrepreneur
- Notable works: Wizard, Wizard Entertainment, ToyFare

Gareb Seth Shamus (/ˈʃeɪməs/ SHAY-məs; born December 23, 1968) is an American publisher. He is the founder, former chairman and CEO of Wizard Entertainment. He is also a co-founder and CEO of ACE Comic Con.

Shamus published Wizard: The Comics Magazine; InQuest Gamer: The Gaming Magazine; ToyFare: The Toy Magazine; Anime Insider; FunFare; "In" Power!, a kids' entertainment magazine; Wizard Specials; Toy Wishes, a holiday toy shopping guide; Bean Power, a Beanie Babies magazine; and Sportslook, a sports card magazine. He also co-founded and was CEO of International Fight League Inc (IFLI). He produced several televised MMA fights with partners Fox Sports Networks and MyNetworkTV.

In April 2023, KuuHubb, Inc. announced that Gareb Shamus was its new CEO.

== Personal life ==
Gareb is the second oldest of four brothers: Ilan, Kenny, and Stephen Shamus, respectively. As a child, he collected comic books and sports cards. His early loves were Spider-Man, Batman, and Mad magazine. As a teenager, he gravitated to more mature comics created by artists like Todd McFarlane and Frank Miller. Shamus studied economics at the University at Albany, SUNY and graduated with a Bachelor of Arts degree in economics, with a minor in art, in 1990.

Gareb has an art studio and gallery where he produces and displays his art. He participates in gallery shows and art fairs across the US.

== Wizard Entertainment ==
In the 1980s, Shamus's parents owned a sports card and comic book store called The Wizard of Cards and Comics in Nanuet, New York, where Shamus worked. When he graduated from college, he started a comic book newsletter, Wizard: The Guide to Comics, for the store’s customers. It became popular enough to be turned into a monthly magazine in 1991. After only one year, Wizard was being published in over 50 countries and in multiple languages, making Shamus well-known in the comic book world. Over the next few years, he launched more magazines covering toys, games, animation, and other "superhero" related media (movies, TV shows, video games, and toys).

Wizard Entertainment acquired the Chicago Comicon in 1997, expanded its scope, and within a year, boosted attendance from a few thousand to 25,000. There were at their peak 25 Wizard World comic conventions and pop-culture conventions hosted in the United States.

== Ace Universe ==
ACE Universe is a New York-based media and experiential events company founded by Gareb Shamus and his brother, Stephen Shamus.

== Selected exhibitions ==
- "Squeezed," Coldstream Fine Art, Toronto, July 8 – August 2, 2017
- "Rungs of Life," Art Exchange London, September 23, 2016
- "Early Days," Art Helix, Brooklyn, September 16, 2016
- "The Pivot Collection," MRG Fine Art, Sherman Oaks, California, July 16, 2016
- "All Art Everything," Guy Hepner Gallery, New York, April 8, 2016
