= Fan Expo Chicago =

Comic book convention

- Status: Active
- Genre: Speculative fiction
- Venue: Donald E. Stephens Convention Center
- Location: Rosemont, Illinois
- Coordinates: 41°58′45″N 87°51′35″W
- Country: United States
- Inaugurated: July 22, 1972; 54 years ago
- Most recent: August 14, 2026; 2 months ago
- Next event: August 20, 2027; 9 months' time
- Attendance: 80,000 (2026)
- Organizer: Fan Expo
- Filing status: For-profit
- Website: fanexpohq.com/fanexpochicago

Fan Expo Chicago (formerly Wizard World Chicago Comic Con, and commonly known as the Chicago Comicon) is a comic book convention held during the summer in Rosemont, Illinois, United States, at the Donald E. Stephens Convention Center. It was traditionally a three-day event (Friday through Sunday), but in 2006, it expanded to four days (Thursday through Sunday). It was founded in 1972 as Nostalgia '72, Chicago Comic Con and later as the Chicago Comic and Nostalgia Convention by a local dealer (and school teacher) named Nancy Warner.

Acquired by Wizard Entertainment in 1997, and Informa's Fan Expo unit in 2021, Fan Expo Chicago is among the larger comic book conventions in the United States, in third place for overall attendance at a single event.

Originally showcasing comic books and related popular arts, the convention has expanded over the years to include a larger range of pop culture elements, such as professional wrestling, science fiction/fantasy, film and television, horror, animation, anime, manga, toys, collectible card games, video games, webcomics, and fantasy novels. From 1995 to 2006, it was also the home of the Wizard World Fan Awards.

== History ==
=== Nostalgia convention ===
Chicago collectibles dealer Nancy Warner staged the area's first comic and collectibles convention on July 22–23, 1972, calling it Nostalgia '72, Chicago Comic Con. It attracted 2,000 attendees. She ran the show, which featured movie screenings, as well as dealers from as far as Los Angeles, Atlanta, Buffalo, New York, and Oklahoma City. In 1973 an unrelated show, called "Chicago Comic Con", produced by Mark Lully of the Atlantis Bookstore, was planned to take place at the Midland Hotel with announced guests including Stan Lee, Jim Steranko, and Mike Hinge, but that show was cancelled.

=== Chicago Comicon ===
Chicago Comicon logo used by the convention for 20 years. Designed by Tim Conrad and adapted by George Hagenauer.

In 1975, Warner approached local comic book store owner Joe Sarno and his associate Mike Gold to produce the show. Their job was to overcome Chicago's reputation of being a sub-par convention city. Early in the process, George Hagenauer and comics retailer Larry Charet were brought in. Although Sarno wanted to name the show the Chicago Comic Art and Nostalgia Convention, he was voted down and the name Chicago Comicon was adopted. The first Chicago Comicon was held in the Playboy Towers Hotel on August 6–8, 1976. Special guests were Marvel Comics figurehead Stan Lee, DC Comics publisher Jenette Kahn, seminal cartoonist/editor Harvey Kurtzman, artist Mike Grell, and illustrator Tim Conrad. The show featured a comic auction benefiting Chicago's Alternative Schools Network (later auctions benefited the Literacy Volunteers of Chicago). The first Chicago Comicon attracted 2,100 attendees.

In 1977, the Chicago Comicon moved back to the Pick-Congress Hotel, on 520 S. Michigan Avenue (the location of the 1973 show), where it remained until 1983. (The Pick-Congress was renamed the Americana-Congress Hotel in 1982.) The producers added Bob Weinberg to help coordinate the 1977 show. Attendance reached 3,000 at an admission charge of $3/day. The 1978 show was dubbed "Sweatcon" because of the extreme heat. The 1979 show was produced by Larry Charet and Bob Weinberg; it was the first year that Joe Sarno was not one of the show's organizers. Admission was $3.50/day.

Show organizers hosted a "Chicago Minicon" on April 26–27, 1980, at the usual location of the Pick-Congress Hotel; guests included John Byrne, Max Allan Collins, Tim Conrad, Mike Grell, Paul Kupperberg, and Marv Wolfman. By 1980, the feature show admission was $4/day, and by 1982, it had gone up to $5/day. Will Eisner was the show's guest of honor for 1981 but was unable to attend due to an accident. He returned in 1982 as the guest of honor, which was the same year that the Chicago Comicon merged with Panopticon West, a Doctor Who convention. Again because of overwhelming heat it was dubbed "Sweatcon II."

The Comicon was expanding, and in 1983 the show moved to the larger venue, the Ramada O'Hare Hotel in Rosemont, Illinois, a northern suburb. That location was the show's home until 1993 when it relocated to the Rosemont Convention Center (now known as the Donald E. Stephens Convention Center), where it has remained ever since. During the mid-1980s, the show organizers hosted annual one-day "Minicons" every December.

The 1985 program booklet celebrated Marvel Comics' 25th anniversary, followed by the 1987 program celebrating Chicago-based First Comics' 5th anniversary, 1988's booklet marking Eclipse Comics' 10th anniversary, and the 1989 program noted Kitchen Sink Press' 20th anniversary. The 1988 show featured the inaugural presentation of the Harvey Awards. One-day admission for the 1988 comicon was $6. The 1989 show focused on Batman, due to the popularity of Tim Burton's Batman movie. It also featured a panel on underground comics that included Harvey Pekar, Jay Lynch, Skip Williamson, and S. Clay Wilson. One-day tickets for the 1989 show were $7.

The 1992 Chicago Comicon celebrated the "spirits of independence" which features the popularly selling group of creators behind Image Comics. Rob Liefeld held a 24-hour autograph session from Friday morning to Saturday morning. The 1992 show featured 200 dealers, and attendees were charged $10 per person or $25 for a three-day pass.

The 1994 show featured 50 publishers and 300 dealers; it also hosted the Comics Arts Conference.

By 1995, the comics industry was in a slump, and attendance at the show was decreasing. By then, the convention ownership included Charet, while the main show organizer was Moondog Comics owner Gary Colabuono. The 1995 Comicon featured a Stan Lee roast, and again hosted the Comics Arts Conference.

In 1996, the Chicago Comicon became the new home of the Wizard World Fan Awards, which were presented at the show every year until their discontinuation in 2006.

=== Wizard World Chicago ===
Wizard World Chicago logo (from the 2012 show)

Wizard Entertainment bought the Chicago Comicon from Charet and his partners in 1997. By the 1997 show, attendance was topping out at 5,000; Wizard's first order of business was to fire the previous convention organizers.

With the 1998 show —out renamed Wizard World Chicago — attendance jumped to 25,000, at a charge of $20 per day or $40 for three days. The 1999 show featured 750 exhibitors.

The 2001 show featured exhibitors like DC, Marvel, Hasbro, and Bandai, and charged attendees $20/day or $40 for the weekend.

By 2006, Wizard World Chicago had expanded to four days and boasted a weekend attendance of over 58,000 people. The 2009 show attracted 70,000 attendees, but neither DC Comics nor Marvel Comics had an official presence at the show.

Disgraced former Illinois governor Rod Blagojevich made an appearance at the 2010 Wizard World Chicago, conversing with and taking pictures with attendants. He charged $50 for an autograph and $80 for a photo. He also had a humorous televised meeting with Adam West; Blagojevich remarked that he considered The Joker to be the best Batman foil. Comic fandom website bleedingcool.com reported that Blagojevich was met with a mostly positive reception, while Time Out Chicago described it as mixed.

The 2011 show charged $35 for a one-day pass and $60 for a four-day pass at the door.

The 2020 show, scheduled for August 20–23, was cancelled due to the COVID-19 pandemic. The next show was scheduled for June 24–27, 2021. The convention was postponed to October 2021 due to COVID-19.

=== Fan Expo Chicago ===
Wizard Entertainment's conventions were sold to Informa's Fan Expo unit in August 2021, and rebranded accordingly beginning in 2022.

=== Dates and locations ===
Dates	Location	Attendance	Official guests	Notes
July 22–23, 1972	Pick-Congress Hotel, Chicago			Known as Nostalgia '72
August 3–5, 1973	Pick-Congress Hotel			
August 6–8, 1976	Playboy Towers Hotel	2,100	Stan Lee, Jenette Kahn, Harvey Kurtzman, Mike Grell, and Tim Conrad	First official Chicago Comicon
August 5–7, 1977	Pick-Congress Hotel, Chicago	3,000	Stan Lee, Jenette Kahn, Chester Gould, and Howard Chaykin	
July 14–16, 1978		2,500	Guest of honor: Chester Gould; other guests include Al Milgrom, Chris Claremont, Rudy Nebres, and Dale Messick	Will Eisner was invited to be an "Extra Special Guest", but couldn't attend due to illness.
July 20–22, 1979		2,000		
July 18-20, 1980	Pick-Congress Hotel		Marv Wolfman	Source:
July 17–19, 1981	Pick-Congress Hotel		Guest of honor: Will Eisner. New guests for 1981: Terry Beatty, Jim Engel, Chuck Fiala, Denis Kitchen, Bill Sienkiewicz, and Dean Mullaney. Returning guests: John Byrne, Howard Chaykin, Chris Claremont, Max Allan Collins, Mike Grell, Mike Friedrich, Roger Slifer, Paul Kupperberg, Marshall Rogers, Jim Shooter, Joe Staton, Roger Stern, Len Wein, Marv Wolfman, and Cat Yronwode	Eisner unable to attend due to an accident.
July 16–18, 1982	Americana-Congress Hotel		Will Eisner	
July 22–24, 1983	Americana-Congress Hotel			The last Chicago Comicon to take place in Chicago (and the last at the Congress hotel)
July 6–8, 1984	Ramada O'Hare, Rosemont	c. 12,000	Jack Kirby, Julius Schwartz	Program cover featuring Superman drawn by Marvel Comics editor-in-chief Jim Shooter.
July 5–7, 1985	Ramada O'Hare		Guest of honor: Sergio Aragonés	Labeled the 10th anniversary show
July 4–6, 1986	Ramada O'Hare	5,000	Stan Lee (guest of honor), George Pérez (special guest), Doug Wildey	
July 3–5, 1987	Ramada O'Hare	c. 4,500		
July 1–3, 1988	Ramada O'Hare	c. 5,000	Max Allan Collins and Dick Locher (special guests); other guests: Bernie Wrightson, Michael Kaluta, Dave Stevens, and Chris Claremont	
June 30–July 2, 1989	Ramada O'Hare	c. 5,000	Jim Aparo, Stan Lee, Harvey Pekar, Jay Lynch, Skip Williamson, and S. Clay Wilson	
July 6–8, 1990	Ramada O'Hare	5,000+	Featured guests: Van Williams, Gerard Christopher, Harvey Kurtzman, and Erik Larsen. Other guests: Mark Gruenwald, Jim Starlin, Tom DeFalco, Len Strazewski, John Ostrander, Kim Yale, Chuck Fiala, P. Craig Russell, Charlie Athanas, Dick Locher, Max Allan Collins, Rick Obadiah, Howard Mackie, and Tony Caputo.	
June 21–23, 1991	Ramada O'Hare		Jim Steranko, Kevin Eastman, and Chris Claremont	
July 4–6, 1992	Ramada O'Hare		Image Comics crew: Rob Liefeld, Mark Silvestri, Erik Larsen, Todd McFarlane, Jim Valentino, and Whilce Portacio; Martin Nodell	
July 2–4, 1993	Rosemont Convention Center	20,000–30,000	Guest of honor: Neil Gaiman	
July 3–5, 1994	Rosemont Convention Center	20,000+	Guest of honor: Harlan Ellison. Special guest: James O'Barr	
June 30–July 2, 1995	Rosemont Convention Center	20,000	Guest of honor: Peter David. Special guests: Sal Buscema, Roy Thomas, John Romita Sr., Chris Claremont, Jim Shooter, and Julius Schwartz	
June 21–23, 1996	Rosemont Convention Center	25,000	Guest of honor: Will Eisner; other guests: Harlan Ellison, Larry Marder, Heidi MacDonald, Mike Richardson, Kurt Busiek, Sergio Aragonés, Evan Dorkin, Paul Levitz, Julius Schwartz, Mercy Van Vlack, and George Pérez	
July 4–6, 1997	Rosemont Convention Center			
July 17–19, 1998	Rosemont Convention Center	25,000	Guest of honor: Todd McFarlane. Special guests: David Prowse and Kenny Baker	
July 9–11, 1999	Rosemont Convention Center			
August 4–6, 2000	Rosemont Convention Center			
August 17–19, 2001	Rosemont Convention Center	40,000+	Guest of honor: Alex Ross. Special guests: Kevin Smith, Jason Mewes, Gene Simmons, Peter Mayhew, David Prowse, Kenny Baker, Kimmie Kappenberg from Survivor, James Marsters, and Juliet Landau	
July 5–7, 2002	Rosemont Convention Center			
August 8–10, 2003	Rosemont Convention Center			
August 13–15, 2004	Rosemont Convention Center			
August 5–7, 2005				
August 3–6, 2006	Donald E. Stephens Convention Center, Rosemont	58,000	Guest of honor: Jeph Loeb	
August 9–12, 2007				
June 26–29, 2008	Donald E. Stephens Convention Center	c. 68,000	Guest of Honor: Warren Ellis. Special Guests: Todd McFarlane, Brian Michael Bendis, Alex Ross, Steve Sansweet	World premiere of the new Batman animated movie Batman: Gotham Night
August 6–9, 2009	Donald E. Stephens Convention Center	70,000	Guest of honor: Mark Millar. Special guest: Jeremy Dale	
August 19–22, 2010	Donald E. Stephens Convention Center		William Shatner, Linda Hamilton, James Marsters, Linda Blair, Nicholas Brendon, Clare Kramer, Claudia Christian, Richard Roundtree, Julia Jones, Joe Madureira, Michael Golden, Arthur Suydam, Brian Pulido, and David W. Mack	Original date of August 12–15 moved so as to not compete with Star Wars Celebration V, taking place in Orlando, Florida;
August 11-14, 2011	Donald E. Stephens Convention Center		Peter S. Beagle, Ian Boothby, Nicholas Brendon, Talent Caldwell, Jim Cheung, Gareth David-Lloyd, Felicia Day, Lou Ferrigno, Gil Gerard, Erin Gray, Chris Hardwick, Greg Horn, Jeff Lewis, Christopher Lloyd, Sean Maher, James Marsters, Peter Mayhew, Addy Miller, Cindy Morgan, Ray Park, Patrick Stewart, Mark Texeira, Billy Tucci	Source:
August 9–12, 2012	Donald E. Stephens Convention Center			
August 8–11, 2013	Donald E. Stephens Convention Center			
August 21–24, 2014	Donald E. Stephens Convention Center		Neal Adams, Bruce Campbell, Jim Cheung, Lou Ferrigno, Jason David Frank, Karen Gillan, Joel Hodgson, Greg Horn, Stan Lee, James Marsters, Leonard Nimoy, Cassandra Peterson, Norman Reedus, Michael Rooker, Marv Wolfman	
August 20–23, 2015	Donald E. Stephens Convention Center		Neal Adams, Adam Baldwin, Jon Bernthal, Bruce Campbell, Arthur Darvill, Larry Elmore, Nathan Fillion, Jason David Frank, Summer Glau, Greg Horn, Ernie Hudson, James O'Barr, Norman Reedus, Michael Rooker, Hideko Tamura Snider, Arthur Suydam, Scott Wilson	
August 24–27, 2016	Donald E. Stephens Convention Center		Gillian Anderson, John Barrowman, Bruce Campbell, John Cena, Tom Cook, Sam Ellis, Lou Ferrigno, Carrie Fisher, Michael J. Fox, Jason David Frank, Michael Golden, Mike Grell, Gene Ha, Greg Horn, Xander Jeanneret, Ken W. Kelly, Kurt Lehner, Christopher Lloyd, Jason Mewes, Trevor A. Mueller, Kate Mulgrew, Phil Ortiz, Humberto Ramos, Norman Reedus, Tim Seeley, Arthur Suydam, Lea Thompson, Cerina Vincent, Greg Weisman, Renee Witterstaetter	
August 24–27, 2017	Donald E. Stephens Convention Center		John Barrowman, Steve Blum, Billy Boyd, Nicholas Brendon, Dean Cain, Charisma Carpenter, Jenna Coleman, Kevin Conroy, Tom Cook, John Cusack, Michelle Delecki, Colin Donnell, Charles Dunbar, Lou Ferrigno, Summer Glau, Mike Grell, Gene Ha, Elizabeth Henstridge, Alex Kingston, Kurt Lehner, Russell Lissau, Caleb McLaughlin, Vic Mignogna, Trevor A. Mueller, James O'Barr, Phil Ortiz, Michael Rooker, Tim Seeley, Kevin Sorbo, Jewel Staite, Catherine Tate, Ben Templesmith, Time Crash, Tim Vigil, Arryn Zech	
August 23–26, 2018	Donald E. Stephens Convention Center			Source:
August 22–25, 2019	Donald E. Stephens Convention Center			Source:
~~August 20–23, 2020~~	Cancelled due to COVID-19 pandemic			
October 15—17, 2021	Donald E. Stephens Convention Center			
July 7–10, 2022	Donald E. Stephens Convention Center			
August 10–13, 2023	Donald E. Stephens Convention Center		Brandon Rogers, Richard Horvitz, Henry Winkler, Bonnie Wright, Steve Burns, Emily Swallow, Brent Spiner, Tom Wilson, Peter Weller, Gabriel Luna, Christopher Lloyd, Katee Sackhoff, Giancarlo Esposito, Michael J. Fox, Lea Thompson, Chevy Chase, Sam Raimi, Zachary Levi, Danny Trejo, Christie Brinkley, Tyler Hoechlin, Bitsie Tulloch, Harvey Guillén, Randy Quaid, Dana Barron, Anthony Michael Hall, Carlos Valdes, Danielle Panabaker, Paul Walter Hauser, Andy Serkis, Garrett Hedlund, Todd Stashwick, Kiefer Sutherland, Dermot Mulroney, Jason Patric, Lou Diamond Phillips, Mira Sorvino, Susan Sarandon, Ivan Raimi, Felicia Day, Michelle Hurd, Barry Bostwick, Beverly D'Angelo	
August 16-18, 2024	Donald E. Stephens Convention Center	75,000	Mark Hamill, Butch Hartman, Peter Cullen, Frank Welker, Amir Talai, Erika Henningsen, Blake Roman, Gina Carano, Laurie Metcalf, Marisa Tomei, Matthew Lillard, William Shatner, Charlie Cox, Adam Savage, Morena Baccarin, Alan Tudyk, Linda Hamilton, Rose McGowan, Mario Lopez, Robert Patrick, Skeet Ulrich, Joonas Suotamo, Lance Henriksen, Shannen Doherty, Johnny Yong Bosch, Patrick Warburton, Wayne Knight, Phil Morris, Larry Thomas, Richard Dreyfuss, Sean Gunn, Eman Esfandi, Diana Lee Inosanto, Holly Marie Combs, Michael Biehn, Lee Waddell, Edward Furlong, Jamie Kennedy, Jim Cummings, Grey DeLisle, Maurice LaMarche, Rob Paulsen, Zach Aguilar, Justin Briner, Maile Flanagan, Kate Higgins, Ryan Colt Levy, Yuri Lowenthal, Christopher Sabat, Megan Shipman, Dave Wittenberg, Johnny Yong Bosch, Fred Tatasciore, Cameron Monaghan, Neil Newbon, Tara Platt, Roger Craig Smith, Patricia Summersett, Ella Purnell	
August 15-17, 2025	Donald E. Stephens Convention Center		Ewan McGregor, Orlando Bloom, Hayden Christensen, Jodie Whittaker, Alicia Silverstone, Ming-Na Wen, Grant Gustin, Manny Jacinto, Kellan Lutz, Peter Facinelli, Dante Bosco, Ashley Greene, Catherine Tate, Mandip Gill, Jackson Rathbone, Jennifer Beals, Ashley Eckstein, Brandon H. Lee, Brendan Fraser, Candice Patton, Carlos Valdes, Danielle Panabaker, Ernie Hudson, Levar Burton, Martin Kove, Patrick Luwis, Peggy the Dog, Rob Schneider, Tom Cavanagh, Richard Horvitz, Vivian Nixon Williams, Morgana Ignis, Bryce Pinkham, Keith David, Zach Tyler Eisen	
August 14-16, 2026	Donald E. Stephens Convention Center		Elijah Wood, Sean Astin, Dominic Monaghan, Billy Boyd, Colin O'Donoghue, Corey Feldman, David Wenham, Dean Cundey, Erica Durance, Joe Pantoliano, John Carpenter, John Nobel, John Rhys-Davies, Karl Urban, Kerri Green, Kristin Kreuk, Christian Borle, Joel Perez, Lilli Cooper, Krystina Alabado, Martha Plimpton, Michael Rosenbaum, Miranda Otto, Nick Castle, P.J. Soles, Robert Davi, Ron Perlman, Tom Welling, Tommy Lee Wallace	

== Criticism and competition ==
By 2009, criticism of Wizard World Chicago had been mounting for a while, particularly from those who resented the show's declining emphasis on the traditional comics market and more on things like professional wrestlers and old TV shows. In addition, local dealers resented the show's location outside of Chicago's city limits and its high exhibition prices. The 2009 show, for the first time, had no representation from major publishers like DC and Marvel. According to Deanna Isaacs of the Chicago Reader, those publishers opted instead to appear at the competitor convention Reed Exhibition's Chicago Comic & Entertainment Expo (C2E2), which challenged Wizard World Chicago's position as Chicago's only major comic convention in 2010.
