= Dead P.A. =

American electronic musical group

- Origin: Houston, Texas, United States
- Genres: Electronic dance music
- Years active: 2003 – Present
- Labels: Goinka Records
- Members: Jason Walsh; George Blitch; Levon Louis; Krystal Hardwick
- Website: Dead P.A.

Dead P.A. is a live electronic musical group typically referred to as a Live P.A. based out of Houston, Texas. Dead P.A. was founded in January 2003 by Jason Walsh and George Blitch. Dead P.A. performs live dancefloor oriented music and is distinguished for thematic sets. Their music is self described as "Drum and Breaks."

== Members ==
=== Principal lineup ===
- Jason Walsh: Vocals, synthesizers, samplers, guitar, lyric and music composition, programming, and production.
- George Blitch: Percussion, vocals, bass, lyric and music composition.

=== Contributing members ===
- Levon Louis: Vocals, synthesizers, samplers, lyric and music composition, programming, and production.
- Krystal Hardwick: Vocals, lyric and music composition.

== Biography ==
=== Before Dead P.A. ===
Prior to forming Dead P.A. Jason Walsh and George Blitch performed in their own respective Houston based rock bands. Facing lineup problems in each of their projects Blitch joined Walsh's band, Backlash in 1995. After one performance together the band dissolved when Blitch "swiped" the bass player to form yet another band. Walsh promptly purchased a drum machine and sampler and began composing electronic dance music. For a short period during 1996 he was a member of the Houston-based electronic act Vertigo Blue. From 1997 to 2002 Walsh performed solo under the moniker Population Zero. As Population Zero, Walsh had three releases on compilations - two of which were later adapted and performed by DEAD P.A. The song "The Thief" was originally released on 1216records' "Emerge" compilation while the song "Nightlight" was released on WE Records "Please Rewind and Play Again vol. 4.

=== History ===
Jason Walsh and George Blitch began practicing as Dead P.A. in January 2003 and performed their first show on February 22, 2003 at a burlesque featuring Dita Von Teese. During 2003 and 2004 The television show Texas Live used Dead P.A. music and original score in its broadcast. The act obtained a unique live p.a. monthly residence at a club in downtown Houston and soon expanded to regional touring throughout the southeast. In July 2005, Levon Louis joined the act contributing to both song writing/production and live performance. Krystal Hardwick joined a year later adding female vocals to the mix. In 2009 DEAD P.A. won a Revolutions Music Award for "Best Live Performance." In 2010 they received a nomination for "Best Instrumental/Experimental" act by the Houston Press.

=== Cancer ===
On January 13, 2007, Walsh was diagnosed with a brain tumor. A craniotomy was performed 10 days later but was largely unsuccessful in removing the tumor. The mass was determined to be an atypical Meningioma. Walsh underwent radiation treatments and chemotherapy upon recovering from the brain surgery. An actual picture from the MRI brain scan of the tumor is on the insert in the case under the CD of the album "The Dead Will Rise."

== Touring live act ==
The live performance always consists of core members Jason Walsh and George Blitch who are on occasion accompanied by contributing members and/or MC vocalists native to the town or region within which they are performing. Much like a club DJ set, Dead P.A. performs their music in a continuous mix. The sets often convey themes using lyrics, samples, costumes, theatrics, remixes, cover songs, and/or video. Blitch performs percussion on a Roland TD-10 electronic drumkit.

Through the years Dead P.A. has performed at such large annual events as Bayfest, Wakarusa Music Festival, Comicpalooza Comic Book Convention, and the Winter Music Conference.

== Discography ==
- Strangelove EP - Silky Sensations Records (2005)
- The Dead Will Rise - Goinka Records (2007) distributed by LOAD Media UK
- DEAD P.A. vs Devine & Emily Play 12" - 2nd Movement/Goinka Records (2008) vinyl release

Various Dead P.A. tracks have been released as digital singles or appeared on compilation releases.
