= Phil Ortiz =

American animator

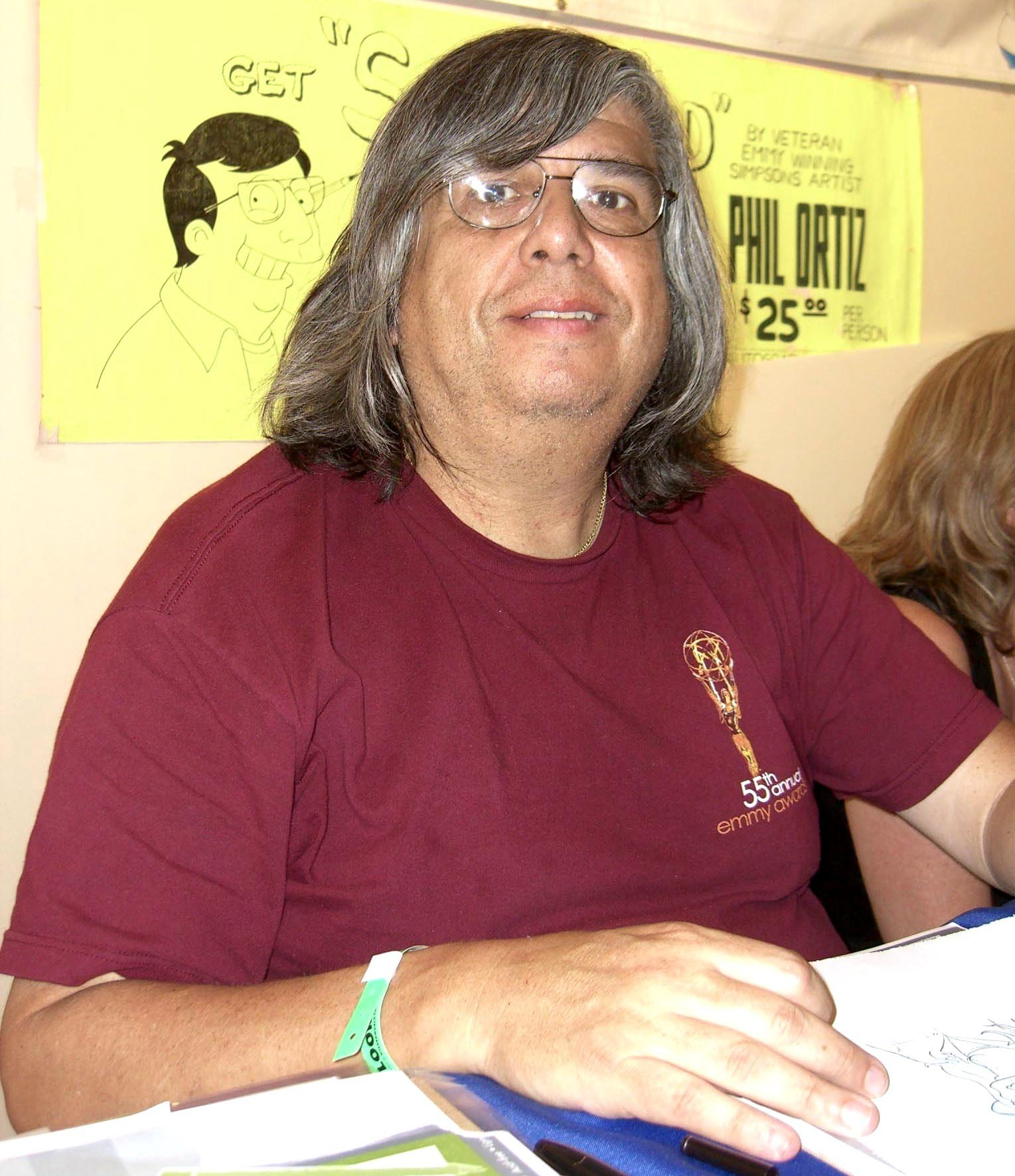
- Ortiz at the Big Apple Convention on May 21, 2011.

Phil Ortiz is an American animator. He has worked for more than 30 years as a professional artist, ranging from daily newspaper comic strips to animated cartoons.

== Awards ==
- 1988–2007: Member of the Academy of Television Arts & Sciences (ATAS)
- 1995–2007: Member of the National Cartoonists Society (NCS)
- 1993–2007: Bongo Comics, Currently, lead pencil animator Simpsons Comics
- 1993–94: Disney Store, Concept illustrations for merchandise
- Hanna-Barbera Character art for merchandising Department
- Al White Studios, Character art for Disney merchandise
- 1991–93: The Walt Disney Company, Publishing Character artist for various children's books. Comic artist for Disney Adventure Magazine
- 1993 Ogilvy & Mather, Storyboard clean-ups for Cocoa & Fruity Pebbles commercials
- 1987–90: Warner Bros. Animation, Inking and layout for the Bugs Bunny comic strip for newspaper publication
- 1989 Calico Productions Layout and model design for Denver The Dinosaur series
- 1989–91: Klasky Csupo, INC. Background design supervisor for The Simpsons TV series
- 1987–88: FILM ROMAN Layouts and model design for the Garfield Christmas Special, Garfield, The Saturday Morning Series, and Garfield's Nine Lives
- 1983–87 Ruby-Spears Productions, Layouts and model design for animation for Alvin And The Chipmunks and other series
- 1978–82: Hanna-Barbera, Layouts, model design, animation arid presentation art for animated shows: The Flintstones, The Smurfs, Richie Rich.

== Personal life ==
Ortiz lives in Lake Arrowhead, California. He has appeared at Wizard World and the Los Angeles Times Festival of Books.
