= Wizard (magazine) =

American magazine about comic books

- Cover of #235, the final issue
- Frequency: Monthly
- Publisher: Gareb Shamus
- First issue: July 1991
- Final issue: March 2011
- Company: Wizard Entertainment
- Country: United States
- Based in: Congers, New York
- Language: English
- ISSN: 1065-6499

Wizard or Wizard: The Magazine of Comics, Entertainment and Pop Culture (previously titled Wizard: The Guide to Comics and Wizard: The Comics Magazine) was a magazine about comic books, published monthly in the United States by Wizard Entertainment from July 1991 to January 2011. It included a price guide, as well as comic book, movie, anime, and collector news, interviews, and previews.

== Publication history ==
Wizard launched in July 1991. With issue #7, the magazine switched to glossy paper and color printing. Wizard strongly supported new publishers Valiant Comics and Image Comics, heavily promoting their new releases.

With its high-end production values and embodiment of the comic speculator boom, Wizard was an instant hit, with a monthly circulation of more than 100,000 copies.

The magazine's success led Wizard Entertainment to launch several ongoing magazines dedicated to similar interests — such as InQuest Gamer for collectible game cards (published 1995–2007), ToyFare for toys and action figures (1997–2011), Anime Insider for anime and manga (2001–2009), and Toy Wishes for mainstream toy enthusiasts (c. 1999–c. 2008).

In 2006, Wizard was revamped with a bigger look and more pages, switching from the "perfect bound" staple-free look to that of a more traditional magazine. In November 2006, Wizard magazine editor-in-chief and co-founder Pat McCallum was fired, after more than a decade with the company. Wizard declined to say why he was removed. On February 21, 2007, Scott Gramling was announced as the new editor-in-chief.

After issue #200 (June 2008), Wizard made several changes to the magazine, shifting focus from reviews and humor to information about upcoming comics and the industry as a whole. The three-page "Magic Words" section, which consisted of reader questions, was dropped and replaced by "Fan Mail", a half-page section allowing three short (and often humorous) letters. Soon after, in August 2008, longtime Wizard Editor Brian Cunningham was removed. The final editor was a former staff writer and managing editor Mike Cotton. On February 27, 2009, Wizard laid off 10% of its workforce, including its three staff writers, in order to make room for freelance writers.

Wizard was relaunched with issue #228 (August 2010), which featured Mark Millar as a guest editor. The magazine returned to its strictly comic book roots. The issue featured a Green Hornet film cover and a round table discussion with creators in the comic book film industry.

Despite all these changes, however, the magazine was losing subscribers at an unsustainable rate; by December 2010, its circulation was just 17,000 copies. On January 24, 2011, Rich Johnston of the website Bleeding Cool confirmed that the magazine would cease print publication, that almost all of its magazine staff had been laid off, and all freelance engagements were canceled. This was confirmed later that day by Wizard, who also revealed that its sister magazine, ToyFare, was also canceled. According to the publication's representatives, Wizard would be relaunched in February 2011 as an online magazine called Wizard World. The first issue of Wizard World was made available online and through major digital distribution channels on March 2, 2011.

== Regular features ==
The magazine went through an ever-changing line-up of regular and semi-regular features, including:

- Book Shelf – Brief descriptions of the monthly trade paperback and hardcover collection releases.
- Top 10 Writers and Artists – Lists charting the most popular creators of the month in each category.

Retired features include

- Casting Call – A feature proposing the "dream" cast for potential film adaptations of various comic books. It later appeared sporadically.
- Last Man Standing – A dream "face-off" between two different characters or teams, always of different companies and/or universes. The feature would detail a brief showdown between the two, including the victor, and would be accompanied by an exclusive illustration (usually by a high-profile artist) depicting the battle.

== Exclusive offers ==
Both Wizard and ToyFare often featured mail-away offers for exclusive merchandise. Wizard began a practice of producing specially offered Wizard #½ issues. These were special issues of ongoing major comic book series which featured in-continuity stories that supplemented the regular series' published issues. The issues were numbered #½ so as not to disrupt the series' ongoing numbering system. Often Wizard would also include free pack-in issues with their magazines, usually numbered as Wizard #0.

== Wizard Fan Awards ==
Wizard Fan Awards
- Awarded for: Works of distinction within the comic book industry
- Sponsored by: Wizard magazine
- Country: United States
- Hosted by: Dragon Con (1993); Philadelphia Comic Book Spectacular (1994); Chicago Comicon (1995–2006)
- First award: 1993
- Final award: 2006
- Website: http://www.wizarduniverse.com/

The magazine presented the Wizard Fan Awards annually for works of distinction within the comics industry from 1993 to 2006. In 1993, the awards were presented at Dragon Con; in 1994, they were presented at Great Eastern Conventions' Philadelphia Comic Book Spectacular; in 1995, the awards moved their home to the Chicago Comicon (later renamed Wizard World Chicago), where they remained for the remainder of their existence.
