= Anime Insider =

Former monthly magazine

- May 2008 Anime Insider cover
- Categories: Anime magazine
- Frequency: Monthly
- Founded: 2001
- Final issue Number: 2009; 67
- Company: Wizard Entertainment
- Country: USA
- Based in: Congers, New York
- Language: English
- Website: www.wizarduniverse.com/
- ISSN: 1547-3767

Anime Insider was a monthly magazine published by Wizard Entertainment, consisting of news and entertainment pieces relating to the Japanese anime and manga subculture. In its earliest incarnation it was published from Fall 2001 till Fall 2002 as a series of quarterly specials under the title Anime Invasion, then became a bi-monthly magazine in November 2002, and was renamed Anime Insider in April 2003. The magazine was changed to a monthly release schedule in July 2005, which remained its current cycle until it ceased publication in 2009.

Wizard touted the magazine as "#1 anime and manga magazine in America" in circulation. While containing informative features, such as interviews or exclusive reporting, articles dedicated to satire or humor were often also included. A trademark feature in Wizard publications, word bubbles were added to printed pictures. With the demise of Newtype USA in February 2008, it was cited as the English-language anime magazine with the highest distribution and sales across North America.

== History ==
The magazine began in 2001 as a one-shot special publication under the name Anime Invasion, but soon changed its name to avoid trademark infringement with another company's brand. Anime Insider was a quarterly magazine during its early years, and it eventually turned into a monthly magazine and remained on that schedule for the last half of its eight-year history. The magazine dropped its cover price in winter 2007 to $4.99 for the U.S. and $5.99 for Canada.

On March 26, 2009, it was announced that Anime Insider would be ending publication after running for eight years. Rob Bricken, a former editor of Anime Insider magazine, wrote that Wizard Entertainment was ending publication of the North American anime and manga periodical. The editorial staff has been laid off.

Anime Insider was also published in Indonesia since 2003. This anime magazine releases except Wizard Magz. Both the magazines are available on Alfamart store, but the magazine will be ceased in May 2011, that means 2 years after the original of Anime Insider was ceased first in 2009.

== Content ==
=== News ===
The News portion covered events and trends in the anime & manga industries as well as coverage of conventions. Factual column Coming Soon consists of licensing announcements and expected releases, while By the Numbers incorporates digits relating to Japanese culture, video game, and anime/manga headlines, and Con Job lists upcoming conventions by location and programming. Entertainment columns within this section included Death of the Month (a character death from a selected series), Top Five (editors' praise for something related to anime culture), and Gratuitous Fanservice (a chosen pair of male and female characters designed to appeal to fans due to their appearances).

=== Reader contributed material ===
Animail, a combination of the words "anime" and "mail", was a section dedicated to answering questions submitted by readers. Results from Anime Insider's monthly web-poll, reader comments, and selected fan art are posted here.

=== Anime features ===
The feature A.I. Five summarized a popular anime title debuting domestically that month by suggesting the top five reasons why viewers would enjoy this particular series/OVA/movie. In their Flash in Japan segment written by Andrez Bergen, an anime series that was currently airing on TVs in Japan was profiled for American audiences, prior to licensing in the U.S., with quotes from the shows' directors. The article Last Man Standing was a fictional story that put two anime characters that are similar in nature (ex. ninjas) but are from different shows against each other in a type of imaginary match.

=== Manga Preview ===
Each month, a new manga title scheduled to be released in America was previewed in Anime Insider, publishing a chapter from an upcoming volume. Some manga included Trigun Maximum and Kashimashi: Girl Meets Girl. The 41's manga preview was Disgaea 2.

=== Main sections ===
==== DVD ====
Dedicated to information regarding domestic DVD sales, this section had a listing of new releases for that month. Recurring segments include Lip Service (interviews with voice actors), Eastern Egg (extras in Japanese DVDs), Must See (new release recommendation), Free Swag (merchandise sold with discs), and Disc Drive (Japanese releases).

==== Theatrical ====
This section focused on theatrical releases of Japanese-produced films and anime. Casting Call (suggestions for actors portraying anime roles) is the recurring column for this section.

==== Manga ====
Offering a listing of English releases and publishing news, the segment included What's the Difference (comparison of titles in both anime and manga forms), Must Read (new manga recommendation), and Read on Arrival (manga not available in English).

==== Television ====
This portion concentrated on anime broadcast on television in English-speaking countries and Japan. The Tune in Tokyo (profiles of anime new to Japan) piece was located here.

==== Music ====
Music incorporated Backstage Pass (profile of a Japanese artist), Face the Music (new soundtrack releases), and Pop Top (top-selling musical recordings according to Oricon, Japan's equivalent of the Billboard charts).

==== Video games ====
Video games covered both Japanese and non-Japanese games and news on consoles and game producers. Columns in video games consist of Continue (news brief), Must Play (new game recommendation), and Import Report (anime related or odd Japanese games).

==== Stuff ====
The heading Stuff was used to describe the portion on anime merchandise, anime figurines, and collectible card games. The only column was Thanks Japan (funny anime-related products from Japan).

==== J-life ====
This section discussed Japanese lifestyles and youth culture. Segments on commercially packaged food, drinks, and other products were under Eat It, Drink It. Interesting and occasionally unusual locations and travel hot-spots were profiled by Tokyo Correspondent Andrez Bergen in Tokyo Travelogue, and lessons in Japanese are given in JPN101.

=== Other sections ===
Other sections included From the Top (an editorial column) and Parting Shot (a bizarre photo of an event/place in Japan).

== See also ==
- List of manga magazines published outside of Japan
