= Greg Horn =

American artist

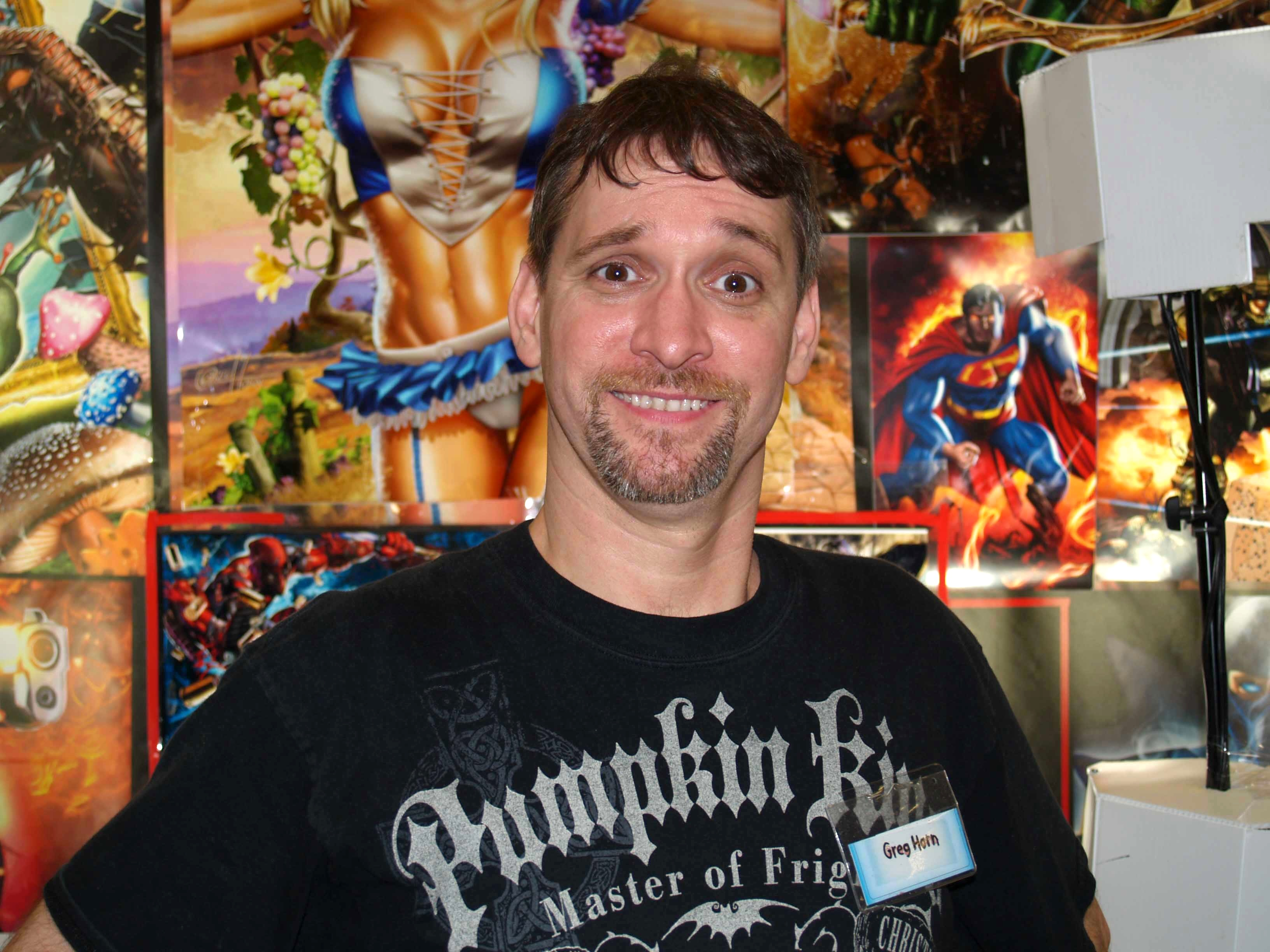
- Horn at the 2013 Wizard World New York Experience in Manhattan
- Area: Cover artist
- Notable works: Elektra; Emma Frost; She-Hulk

Greg Horn is an American comic book artist best known for his work as a cover artist for Marvel Comics and various other publications. Working primarily as a digital painter, he is well known for his pinup paintings of female characters. In addition to comic book covers, his art has been featured in posters for basketball at the 2004 Summer Olympics, video game magazines such as Official Xbox Magazine and InQuest Gamer, and several covers and illustrations for the comic book news magazine Wizard.

In 2008, his projects included covers for the ongoing Ms. Marvel series from Marvel Comics, Jenna Jameson's Shadow Hunter from Virgin Comics, as well as a series of pieces promoting Marvel's 2008 "event" Secret Invasion.

== Bibliography ==
=== Arcana Studio ===
- Ezra (2004)

=== DC Comics ===
- Blackest Night: Wonder Woman, miniseries, #1–3 (2009)
- Flash, vol. 3, #3B (2010)
- Green Arrow, vol. 3, #30 (2010)
- Green Lantern Corps, vol. 2, #41–42, 44–46 (2009–2010)
- Justice League: The Rise of Arsenal, miniseries, #1–4 (2010)

=== Image Comics ===
- Devastator #1–2 (covers and interior art) (1998)
- Espers #1–6 (covers and interior art); #7 (cover) (1997)
- Madame Mirage #1 (2007)
- Witchblade #116 (2008)

=== Marvel Comics ===
- Anita Blake: Vampire Hunter in Guilty Pleasures #1 (2006)
- Backpack Marvels: X-Men #2 (2000)
- Black Widow: Pale Little Spider, miniseries, #1–3 (2002)
- Daredevil, vol. 2, #65 (interior art, among other artists) (2004)
- Dark Avengers #11–12 (interior art, along with Mike Deodato) (2009)
- Deadline, miniseries, #1–4 (2002)
- Elektra, vol. 2, #1–22 (2001–2003)
- Emma Frost #1–18 (2003–2005)
- Iron Man, vol. 3, #50 (2002)
- Marvel Knights Double-Shot (Elektra) #3 (interior art) (2002)
- Marville #1-7 (2002–2003)
- Ms. Marvel, vol. 2, #12–30, Annual #1 (2007–2008)
- Mystique #8 (2004)
- New Avengers #50 (interior art, among other artists) (2009)
- Namor, vol. 2, #8 (2003)
- She-Hulk, vol. 2, #1-19, 21 (2005–2007)
- X-Men Universe #12-15 (2000–2001)
