= Renée Witterstaetter =

American comic book writer

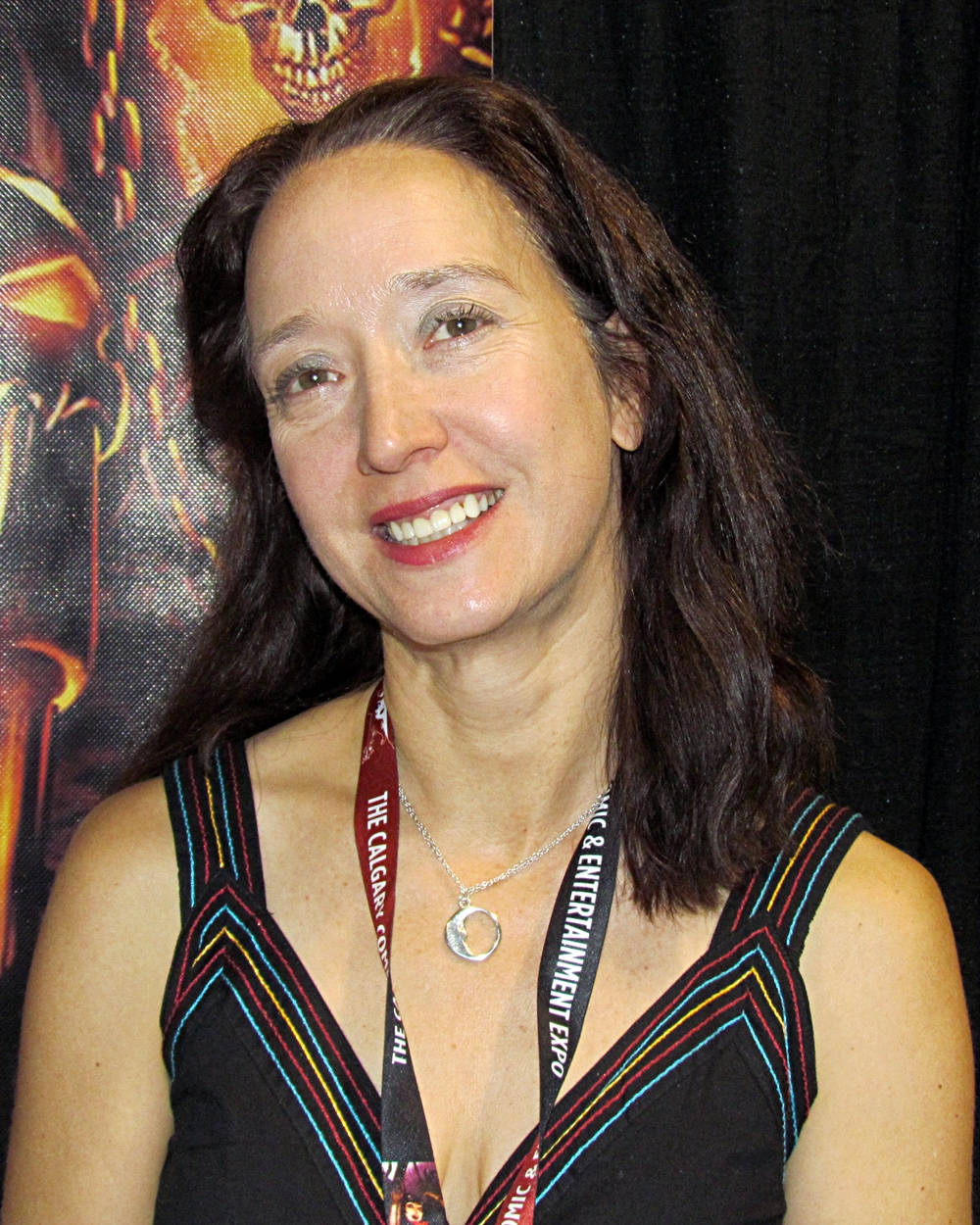
- Witterstaetter at the NYC Comic Con 2022
- Occupations: Colorist, editor, writer
- Notable work: Superman, Silver Surfer, She-Hulk
- Website: witterstaetterwrites.blogspot.com

Renée Witterstaetter, sometimes credited as Eva Renee Witterstaetter, is an American comic book colorist, editor, producer, and writer. She has worked on comics such as the Avengers, Spider-Man, She-Hulk, and Superman. She is best known for her work as an editor with John Byrne on the Marvel Comics series The Sensational She-Hulk. Witterstaetter was also featured as a fourth wall-breaking character in the same series.

== Career ==
Witterstaetter started her career as an assistant editor at DC Comics working on the Superman comics. She later worked at Marvel Comics on Silver Surfer and Conan. While at Marvel she was a colorist on many series including the Avengers, Spider-Man, and Captain America. As a colorist her influences include Maxfield Parrish.

== Bibliography ==
As an editor Witterstaetter's work includes:

=== DC Comics ===
- Superman

=== Marvel Comics ===
- Silver Surfer
- Savage Sword of Conan
- The Sensational She-Hulk

=== Topps Comics ===
- Hercules
- Jurassic Park
- Jason Vs. Leatherface
- Spartan X
- Xena
- X-Files

=== Other publishers ===
As an author:

- Dying for Action: The Life and Films of Jackie Chan
- Excess: The Art of Michael Golden
- Kerry and the Scary Things
- Nick Cardy: The Artist at War
- Nick Cardy: Wit-Lash
- Tex: The Art of Mark Texeira
