= Dirk Strangely =

American artist

- Strangely at Dragon Con in 2026
- Born: John Christopher Carson; August 8, 1978 (age 48) Las Vegas, Nevada, United States
- Areas: Writer, Penciller, Inker
- Notable works: Graveyard Girl; Letters from Paris; Dollface; The Rootles; Strange Stories for Strange People

Dirk Strangely is a multimedia artist based in Houston, Texas. He is frequently a guest artist at comic book, horror, and sci-fi conventions, and is featured often at art exhibitions. While primarily working with ink and paint, he also utilizes photography and film in conjunction with ink and paint to create multimedia projects that are sold both in original form and reprints. His work is also seen in comic books. He is the creator of many independent comics (i.e. Graveyard Girl), and contributor to other comics, such as doing a featured pinup for the 2nd volume of Tokyopop's Legends of the Dark Crystal.

== Early life ==
Dirk was born in Las Vegas, Nevada to John T. Carson and Charolette A. Carson. He began drawing in early childhood, and at the age of seven he learned to play the guitar on an instrument he found in a crime scene apartment. He remained in the Las Vegas area until relocating to Houston in 2002, where he first met frequent music collaborator Andy VK. In 2004, Dirk joined the United States Navy in the supply department. While there, he came up with the pen name "Dirk Strangely" 2005 to remain anonymous, as he was painting using time, space, and supplies scavenged from the ship and didn't wish to have charges pressed against him. These early paintings were sold strictly on eBay, which garnered him a greater income than his military paycheck.

== Career ==
Shortly after being honorably discharged from military service in 2008, Dirk began work full-time as a multimedia artist. At first staying with family while pursuing his career, he was able to build a studio on family land. He quickly began appearing in Artist Alley at various conventions around the state, which lead to him expanding to the national level. In 2011 he moved to Florida for a year while his work was on display in Downtown Disney in the PoP and Hoypoloi art galleries. He returned to Houston, Texas afterwards. Along with frequent appearances at comic conventions, Dirk launched an artist-centered social media platform, Artfarm.tv, that connects artists with patrons, and viewers, and other artists for live-art streaming and sales.

== Music ==
Strangely was the lead vocalist and lead guitar player of Dirk Strangely and the Hatchetmen. The band was described as having a blend of surf, psychobilly, honky tonk, and romani musical influences.

Dirk is currently writing a new album for his project Dirk Strangely and Friends, a band heavily influenced by classic outlaw country artists.
