= Wizard Entertainment =

Producer of multi-genre fan conventions

Wizard Entertainment, Inc.
- Formerly: Wizard Press (1991–2011); Wizard World, Inc. (2011–2018)
- Traded as: OTCQB: WIZD
- Industry: Entertainment
- Founded: 1991; 35 years ago (as Wizard Press)
- Founder: Gareb Shamus (Wizard Press)
- Defunct: 2021; 5 years ago
- Fate: Conventions sold to FanExpo
- Successor: FanExpo
- Headquarters: Los Angeles, California, U.S.
- Area served: North America
- Products: Hobbyist magazines (1991–2011)
- Services: Fan conventions (1997–2021)
- Website: wizardworld.com

Wizard Entertainment Inc., formerly known as Wizard World, was a producer of multi-genre fan conventions across North America.

The company that became Wizard Entertainment began in 1991 as Wizard Press, the publisher of the monthly magazine Wizard. That company evolved into a multi-title publishing company with diversified interests in branded products and related convention operations. By 2011, the company had discontinued its print division to focus exclusively on its convention business. By 2015, the company had expanded to producing 25 annual conventions around the U.S. In 2021, Wizard sold its convention events business to FanExpo.

== Corporate history ==
Gareb Shamus founded Wizard magazine in January 1991 shortly after he graduated from college. The company was originally based in Congers, New York.

Wizard magazine was successful, and the company expanded its publishing operations with more magazines devoted to other elements of the collectible industry. Wizard purchased the Chicago Comicon in 1997 to expand from its core publishing business into trade/consumer conventions.

In early 2011, the company made some major corporate transitions. First, through an arrangement with Strato Malamas of the holding company GoEnergy, it became a publicly traded company known as Wizard World. At the same time, it abruptly canceled Wizard magazine and its other remaining publication, ToyFare, to focus on its convention business.

Shamus was pushed out as company CEO in late 2011; his position was taken in March 2012 by John Macaluso. In 2015, the company lost $4.25 million in revenue and cut back from 25 to 19 convention events in 2016. Less than a week after the announcement of the losses, Macaluso resigned as CEO and was replaced by John D. Maatta.

In 2018, Wizard World was renamed Wizard Entertainment, Inc.

In 2021, after selling its last few conventions to FanExpo, Wizard Entertainment essentially ceased to exist.

== Publishing ==
Wizard started as a price guide to comics but evolved into focusing squarely on pop culture, specifically targeting young adult males. (The magazine ultimately featured a price guide to comics and action figures in the back of the magazine.) With its high-end production values and embodiment of the comic speculator boom, Wizard was an instant hit, with a monthly circulation of more than 100,000 copies (although by early 2006, circulation was down to around 50,000).

The magazine also spawned several ongoing magazines dedicated to similar interests, such as InQuest Gamer (launched 1995), for collectible game cards; ToyFare: The Toy Magazine, for toys and action figures (launched 1997); Anime Insider (launched 2001) for anime and manga; and Toy Wishes (launched 2001) for mainstream toy enthusiasts.

On January 24, 2011, after 20 years of publication, the company announced that Wizard would cease print publication and become an all-digital magazine called Wizard World, launching in February 2011. At that point Wizard Entertainment also ceased publication of its sister magazine, ToyFare.

=== Black Bull Entertainment ===
In 2000, Wizard founder Shamus forayed into the world of actual comic book publishing, creating the imprint Black Bull Entertainment, featuring several well-known creators, including Mark Waid, Chris Eliopoulos, Nelson DeCastro, and Garth Ennis. The first Black Bull title was the limited series Gatecrasher: Ring of Fire. Black Bull's titles included:

- Beautiful Killer (2002–2003), #1–3
- Gatecrasher (2000–2001), #1–6
- Gatecrasher: Ring of Fire (2000), #1–4
- Just a Pilgrim (2001), #1–5
- Just a Pilgrim: Garden of Eden (2002), #1–4
- The New West (2005), #1–2
- Shadow Reavers (2001–2002), #1–5

Black Bull published comics through 2005.

== Conventions ==
=== Beginnings and growth ===
Wizard purchased the Chicago Comicon in 1996; the renamed "Wizard World Chicago" was the template for a new kind of convention that shifted its focus from actual comic books to ancillary elements of pop culture fandom: celebrity performers, films, television, video games, and toys – "comic conventions" almost in name only. By 2006, Wizard World Chicago boasted a weekend attendance of over 58,000 people.

In May 2002, Wizard branched out from Chicago and produced Wizard World East at the Pennsylvania Convention Center in Philadelphia. And in 2003 the company produced Wizard World Texas, adding Wizard World Los Angeles in 2004 and Wizard World Boston in 2005.

In 2007–2008, Wizard held conventions in Los Angeles, Philadelphia, Chicago, and Texas. In 2008, Wizard began adding an academic forum called "Wizard World University," integrating scholarly panels into its conventions, beginning with the November convention in Arlington, Texas.

=== "Con Wars" / growing pains ===
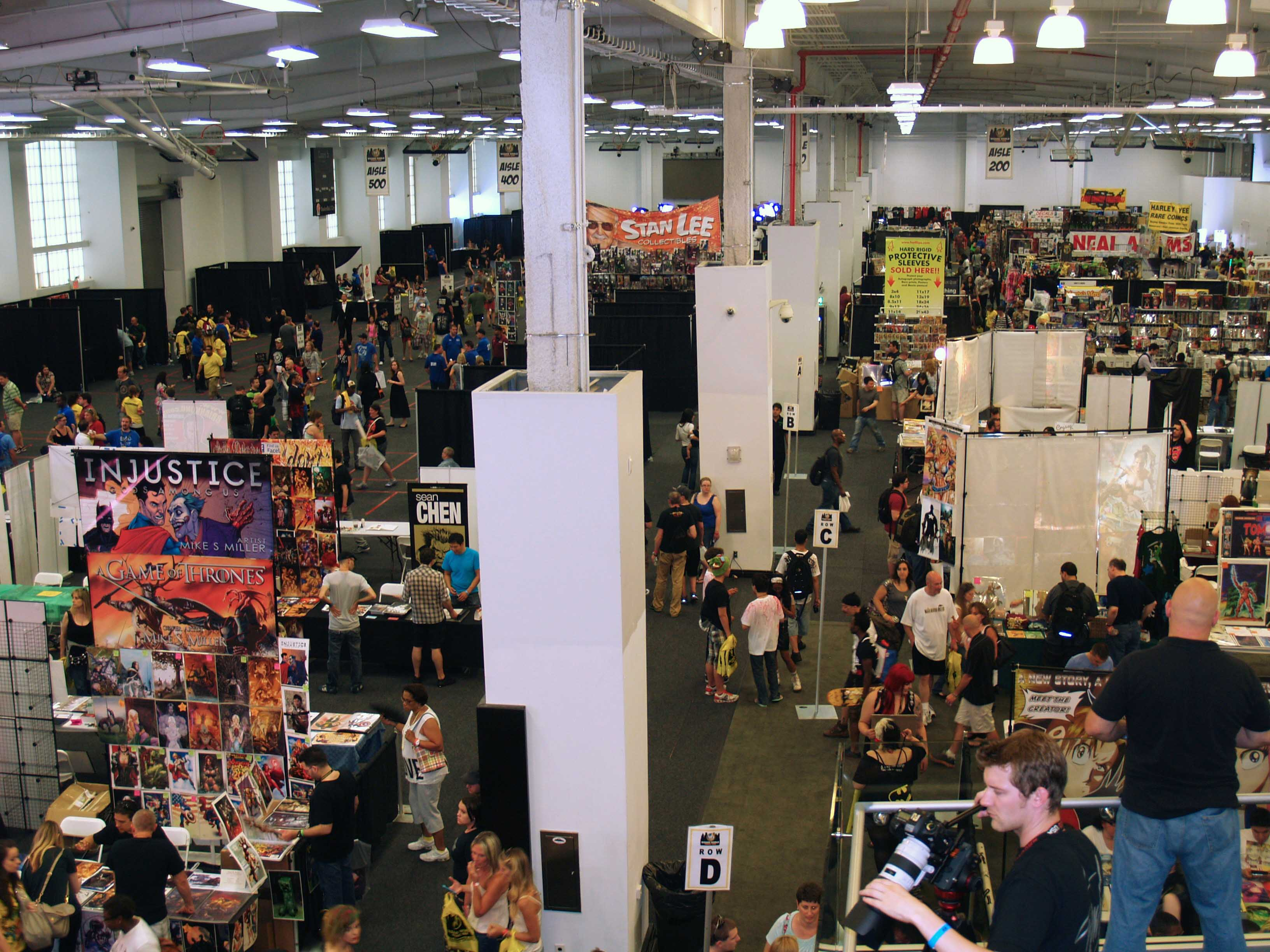
The floor of the 2013 Wizard World New York Experience at Pier 36 in Manhattan

Beginning in 2005, Wizard CEO Gareb Shamus made a concerted push to dominate the North American convention circuit. First, Wizard announced that it would be holding a comic book convention in Atlanta from June 30 – July 2, 2006, the same dates on which the long-running Charlotte, North Carolina–based Heroes Convention was scheduled to take place. This caused an outcry amongst the comic book community, as Atlanta is only a four-hour drive from Charlotte, and several comic book creators voiced concerns about an attempt by a large, corporate event to force out an independent comic book convention. As a result of the outcry, many prominent creators signed up to appear at HeroesCon 2006 rather than the competing Wizard con. Wizard ultimately announced that it would postpone the planned Atlanta convention until 2007.

In 2009, Wizard canceled its Texas event and postponed the Los Angeles convention. That spring and summer, however, Shamus/Wizard acquired the Paradise Comics Toronto Comicon and the Big Apple Comic Con, New York City's longest-running comic book, science fiction, fantasy, horror, and pop culture convention.

Wizard Entertainment's 2010 planned North American Comic Con tour included city stops in Toronto, Anaheim, Philadelphia, Chicago, New York City, Boston, New Jersey, and Austin. As part of a "major offensive against Reed Exhibitions' New York Comic Con," Wizard scheduled "three East Coast shows in a row—the New England Comic-Con in Boston on October 1-3, Big Apple the same weekend, and the new New Jersey Comic-Con the weekend after, on October 15-17." The 2010 Big Apple Comic Con was scheduled for October 7–10, the same dates as the previously scheduled New York Comic Con. After a public outcry, Wizard ended up moving the dates of its 2010 New York convention to October 1–3. (Additionally, the planned Wizard 2010 New Jersey convention was canceled.)

Despite Wizard World's setbacks in Atlanta/Charlotte and New York City, by late 2010, it was apparent that the company's strategy was to blanket the U.S. with Wizard conventions, including buying previously existing small-scale shows in various locations.

=== Going public; further expansion ===
Wizard went public in 2011; its financial statements proved that it was doubling down on dominating the North American convention market:

The majority of our target audience is male-oriented and are major buyers of many types of entertainment and media.... We believe that this male demographic consists of tens of millions consumers in the United States and has hundreds of billions in spending power.... Our competitors are local one-time event comic cons. We have a competitive advantage over these comic cons because they do not have our economies of scale and operating efficiencies.... Further, the size of our Comic Cons and the volume at which we produce them give us the leverage to negotiate discounts on such things as hotels and other travel expenses.... We also believe that the size and volume of our Comic Con tours create a barrier to entry of new industry participants because, due to their size, such new industry participants would find it difficult to enter into certain markets, such as the larger metropolitan cities.

Wizard's 2011 convention calendar included "a show-a-month schedule" and guest-lists of "nerd-lebrities of various levels of fame,... turning their shows into autograph-focused events." Ultimately, however, Wizard scaled back its 2011 operations to seven shows—New Orleans, Toronto, Big Apple (New York), Philadelphia, Mid-Ohio, and Austin—ultimately canceling scheduled conventions in Los Angeles, Miami, Atlanta, and Central Canada. In addition, previously announced new Wizard conventions in New Jersey, Cincinnati, Cleveland, and Nashville never materialized.

Wizard skipped New York altogether in 2012, returning in 2013 with a "Wizard World New York Experience" focused on "celebrities, creators, sports stars, music, exhibitors, parties and other attractions"—very little comics content. The rest of Wizard's 2013 convention schedule included Portland, St. Louis, Philadelphia, Wizard World Chicago, Ohio Comic Con, Nashville, Austin, and New Orleans. In September 2013, Wizard World announced seven new stops for the 2014 tour: Sacramento, Louisville, Minneapolis, Atlanta, San Antonio, Richmond, and Tulsa. Wizard gave up the New York market after 2013 due to the dominance of the New York Comic Con; in 2014 the Big Apple con was reacquired by its founder, Michael Carbonaro.

The explosion in Wizard-produced conventions brought accusations that the entertainment behemoth was deliberately trying to push its competitors out of business. On the other hand, many praised Wizard's professional and standardized approach to producing conventions.

=== Convention contraction ===
In 2015, Wizard produced 25 conventions but lost $4.25 million in revenue. The 2016 schedule, cut back to 19 events, included Wizard cons in Portland, Cleveland, Las Vegas, St. Louis, Madison, Minneapolis, Des Moines, Philadelphia, Sacramento, Albuquerque, Columbus, Orlando, Chicago, Richmond, Austin, Tulsa, and Pittsburgh.

By 2018, the company was producing thirteen annual conventions around the U.S.

=== Post-pandemic woes; sale of convention business ===
The COVID-19 pandemic hit Wizard Entertainment hard—as it did the convention business worldwide. Most 2020 conventions scheduled for after mid-March of that year were canceled, and many moved online in 2021.

Wizard World held only six in-person conventions in 2021, and that August the company announced it would be selling the convention events business to FanExpo, with the final Wizard World Chicago show occurring in October.
