= Christina Z =

American comics writer

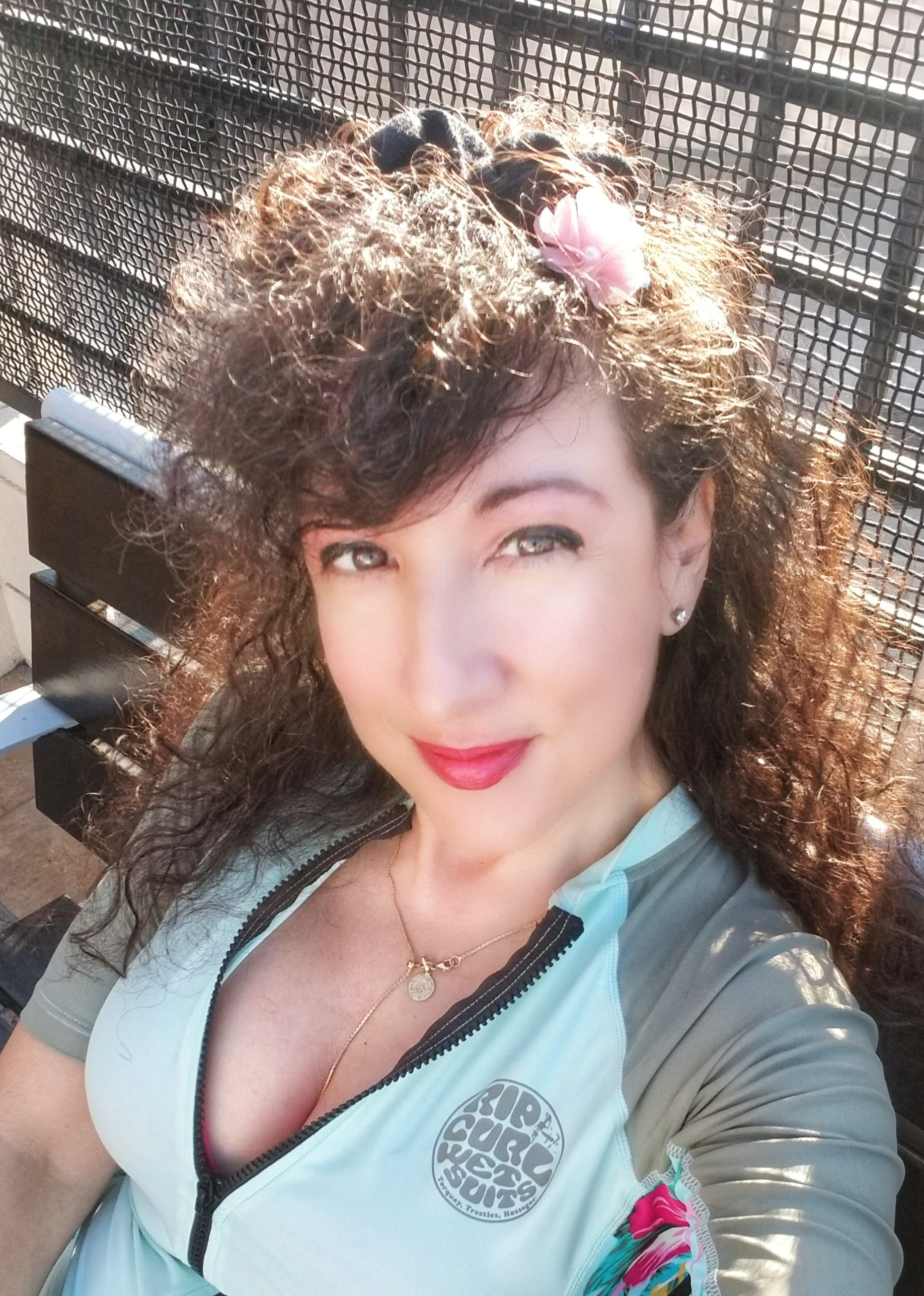
- Z in 2019
- Born: Munich, West Germany
- Areas: Writer, journalist, critic
- Notable works: Witchblade; Master Darque

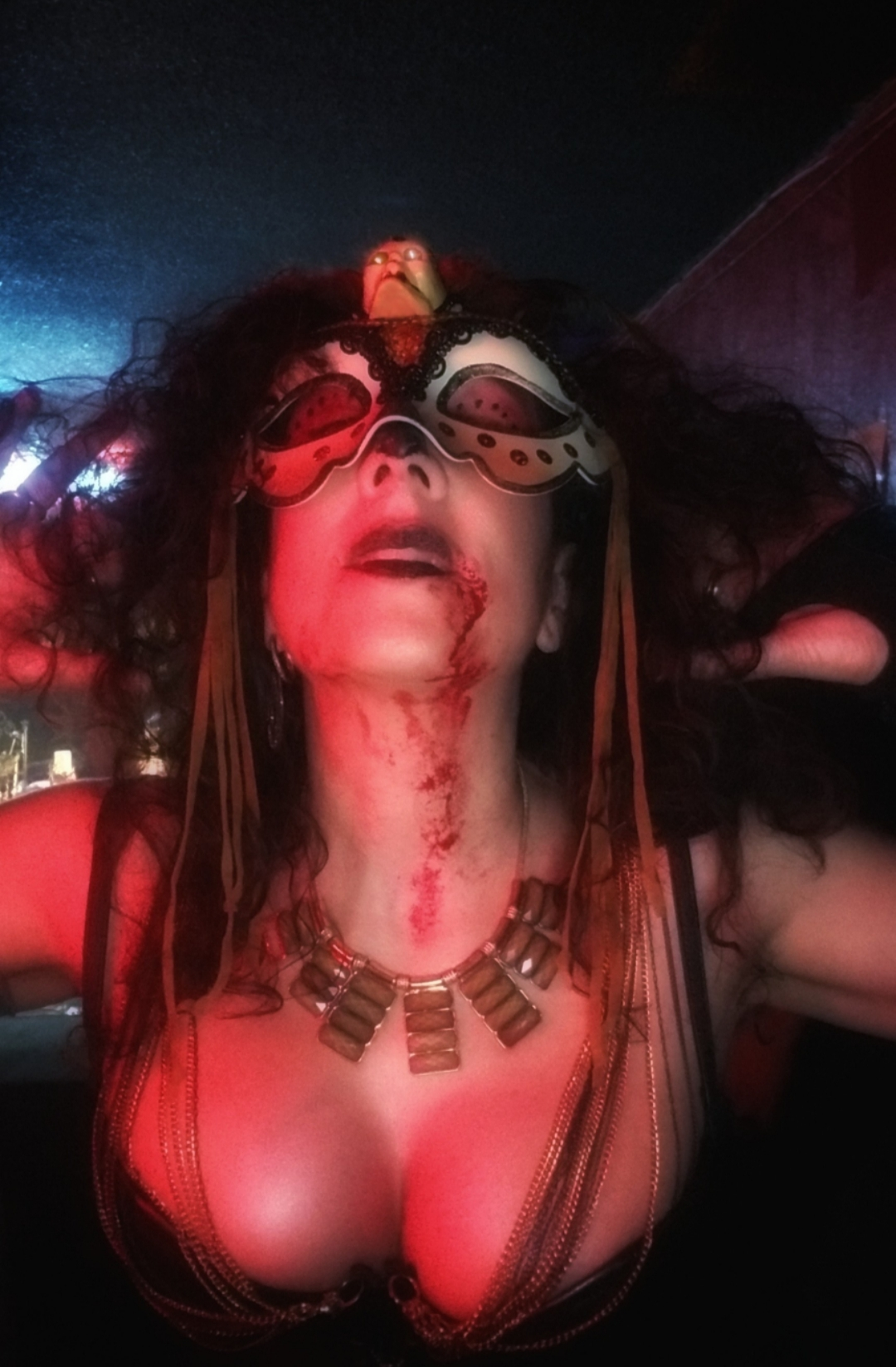
Z cosplaying in 2019

Christina Z is an American comics writer known for her work on the Image Comics title Witchblade. She wrote and laid the foundation of the first 39 issues of the Witchblade series. In 2008, she made news by taking the writing duties for Virgin Comics Shadow Hunter that featured adult film star Jenna Jameson. She has also been a music journalist on and off over the course of 20 years.

== Early life ==
Christina Z was discovered in comics from her writing as a music journalist. She was a column editor, music reviewer and club reviewer for Urb magazine in addition to freelancing for other music magazines at the time. She has worked with musicians in the area of writing and conceptualization.

== Career ==
=== Comics and graphic novels ===
Under the imprint of Top Cow, Christina Z came on board writing and editing Witchblade #1 and continued writing the title for the next 3 1/2 years. She was instrumental in shaping the character throughout its seminal creation. She wrote issues of Ripclaw, a comic book about a supernatural Native American Indian. Upon the success of Witchblade, Christina Z wrote issues of Tales of the Witchblade, a series that told historical events of the mythic weapon and Witchblade Destiny's Child series.

A split anthology series titled Shadowplay by IDW was one of the first R-rated comics that was written by Christina Z and illustrated by UK artist Ashley Wood. The theme of the book covered extreme BDSM themes and body modification.

A relaunch of the Tigra character initially created in 1972 was given a series by Christina Z for Marvel Comics. It was pencilled by Mike Deodato Jr. and edited by Tom Brevoort. Christina Z's first child-friendly project was a Powerpuff Girls comics for DC Comics.

Acclaim Comics held the license for Master Darque and was relaunched as Darque Passages with Christina Z as the writer and Hellblazer artist Leonardo Manco. Under the editing team of Fabian Nicieza and Jeff Gomez, the relaunch was considered a great success that led the publishing company to relaunch their cadre of other historic characters.

Due to the success of the video game BloodRayne, Echo 3 Worldwide contacted Christina Z to launch the Bloodrayne series. It tells the violent story of a Dhampir, half human, half vampire. Artistic duties were handled by illustrator Kody Chamberlain of vampire series 30 Days of Night fame.

Progressing into self-produced comics, comic book and Blizzard video game artist Trent Kaniuga and Christina Z collaborated in creating a relaunch of his creator-owned CreeD called Utopiate under the imprint of Image Comics. The book was painted by Kaniuga with the graphic design, writing and lettering done by Christina Z.

In 2008, business magnate Richard Branson began publishing comics with Shadow Hunter, a comic book with adult film star Jenna Jameson as the main character and Christina Z as the writer in a supernatural series.

Christina Z was the first woman to break onto the Wizard magazine Top 10 list of top-selling writers.

=== Music journalism career ===
Christina Z is known for being among the first to document the secretive and underground Los Angeles Rave scene in the 1990s with her column "Da Scoop" for Urb magazine. Christina Z helped hand-distribute the monthly full-sized magazines to the warehouse parties every week after publication from the trunk of her car.

Christina Z worked with several electronic music and industrial music record labels, interviewing artists and reviewing music. Her writing has been featured in magazines such as Urb, Rolling Stone, Alternative Press, Fix, Club Life, Exit and others.

=== Musical career ===
Christina Z worked with DreamWorks Records, a subsidiary of Geffen Records, to conceive the industrial music/ metal genre album Witchblade: The Music. The album includes tracks written, produced, performed and mixed by Peter Steele of Type O Negative, Buzz Osbourne of the Melvins, Kat Bjelland of Babes in Toyland, Jim Thirlwell of Foetus and Coil, Dave Ogilvie of Skinny Puppy, Chris Vrenna of Nine Inch Nails and Marilyn Manson, and Dave Mustaine of Megadeth.

In 2019, Christina Z teamed up with prolific Belgian composer Jean-Marc Lederman on a double CD hardcover photo book and ghost story anthology called 13 Ghost Stories. It features Beborn Beton staff Stefan Netschio, Bruderschaft staff Rexx Arkana, Cassandra Complex originator Rodney Orpheus and others. The art was created by visual artist Erica Hinyot.
