= Teddy and the Yeti =

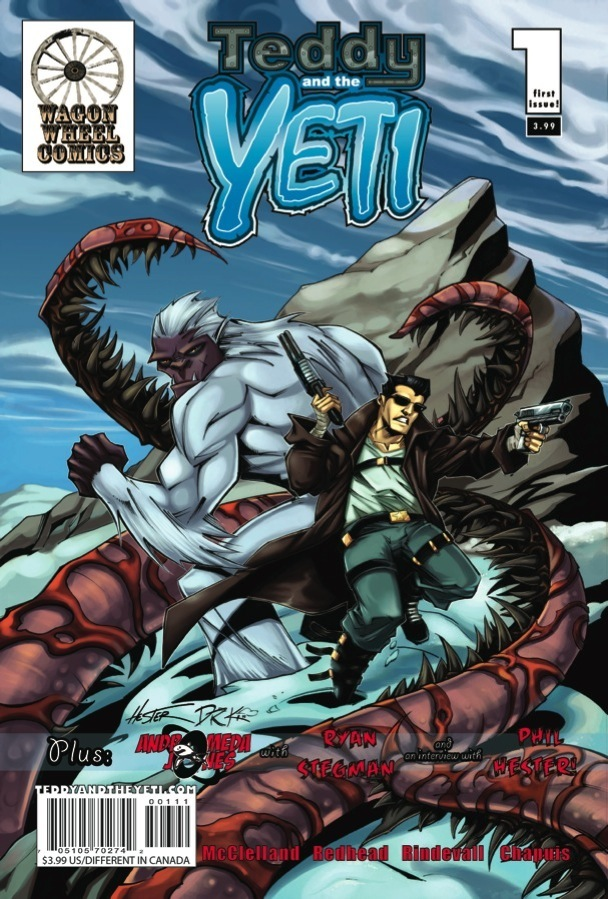
- Teddy and the Yeti #1 cover. Art by Phil Hester.

Publication information
- Publisher: Wagon Wheel Comics
- Schedule: bimonthly
- Format: Ongoing series
- Genre: Action/adventure, science fiction
- Publication date: December 2009 – present
- No. of issues: 3 (as of April 2010)

Creative team
- Created by: Jeff McClelland, Duane Redhead
- Written by: Jeff McClelland
- Artist(s): Duane Redhead
- Letterer(s): Jeff McClelland
- Colorist(s): Karin Rindevall; Nic Chapuis; Paul John Little; Caroline Jamhour

Teddy and the Yeti is an American comic book series created by Jeff McClelland and Duane Readhead. Published by Wagon Wheel Comics, the serialized story features a robot and a yeti who defend Earth from external threats. The first issue of the ongoing series was released on December 30, 2009 as part of Indy Comic Book Week. The concept of the book was developed because McClelland liked the rhyming title.

== Publication history ==
Teddy and the Yeti first appeared in the anthology Josh Howard Presents: Sasquatch from Viper Comics April 15, 2007. The story, titled "Presidents and Precedence" and printed in black and white, was a late addition to the book, added after another creative team dropped out, leaving an open spot.

In 2008, a black and white preview issue was published featuring the story "To Sleep", and an ad promoting the regular series. Fist of Justice #5 from Digital Webbing Press also ran a back cover ad for the series.

The first three issues of the regular series were released in December 2009, February 2010 and April 2010, with more to come in 2011. In August 2010, McClelland announced that Teddy and the Yeti would play a small part in the comic series War of the Independents from Red Anvil Comics.

== Characters ==
- Ted: A sentient android created by Dr. Barton. Ted works, with the Yeti, as an agent for the futuristic Global Defense Agency.
- Yeti: A mythical abominable snowman discovering humanity for the first time. She teams with Ted as an agent in the Global Defense Agency.
- Amadeus Wynn: Ted's former partner in the Global Defense Agency; Wynn now holds the position of Commander.
- Dr. Edwin Theodore Barton: Ted's creator and a former member of the Global Defense Agency. He supposedly died on the same Himalayan mission when the Yeti was discovered.

== Plot synopsis ==
The first story arc, "Truth and Consequences", expands on the origin tale featured in "Presidents and Precedence". The story shows how the two main characters first met and reveals who Ted's creator really is. In the course of the first issue, the Yeti rescues Ted from captives intent on stealing an important file from his cybernetic body. Once Ted discovers the file for himself, it leads him back to the creator he had thought long dead.

== Other features ==
In addition to episodic stories highlighting the title characters, each issue of Teddy and the Yeti contains at least two other features: a short "backup" story with new characters, and an interview with an established professional comic book artist. The first issue features the character Andromeda Jones and an interview with artist Phil Hester; the second, Mr. Massive (co-created by Ratha Oeur) and an interview with artist Todd Nauck; the third, Ultimate Hero (co-created by Michael Adams) and an interview with artist Tom Scioli.

== Distribution ==
Teddy and the Yeti had originally been scheduled to be distributed by Diamond Comic Distributors, but before its scheduled release date, the first issue was picked up by Haven Distributors instead.

== Reception ==
Comic News Insider, a comic book related podcast, reviewed Teddy and the Yeti #1 on January 5, 2010. The reaction was mixed: one host said, "In short, I found it to be too much time jumping. And the mystery of this random chip that he finds in him...wasn't that interesting", while the other said, "I found it...enjoyable...maybe it's just the name that gets me. I was interested in seeing where it was going."
