= Jesus Freak (disambiguation) =

Jesus freak is a pejorative term for Christians.

Jesus Freak may also refer to:

- Jesus Freak (album), a 1995 album by dc Talk
  - "Jesus Freak" (song), the title song of the album
- Jesus Freaks (book), a 1999 book by the band dc Talk and the organization Voice of the Martyrs
- Jesus Freak (film), a 2003 US feature film by Morgan Nichols
- Jesus Freaks (youth movement), a German youth movement
- Jesusfreak (graphic novel), a 2019 graphic novel
