= Joe Casey =

American comic book writer

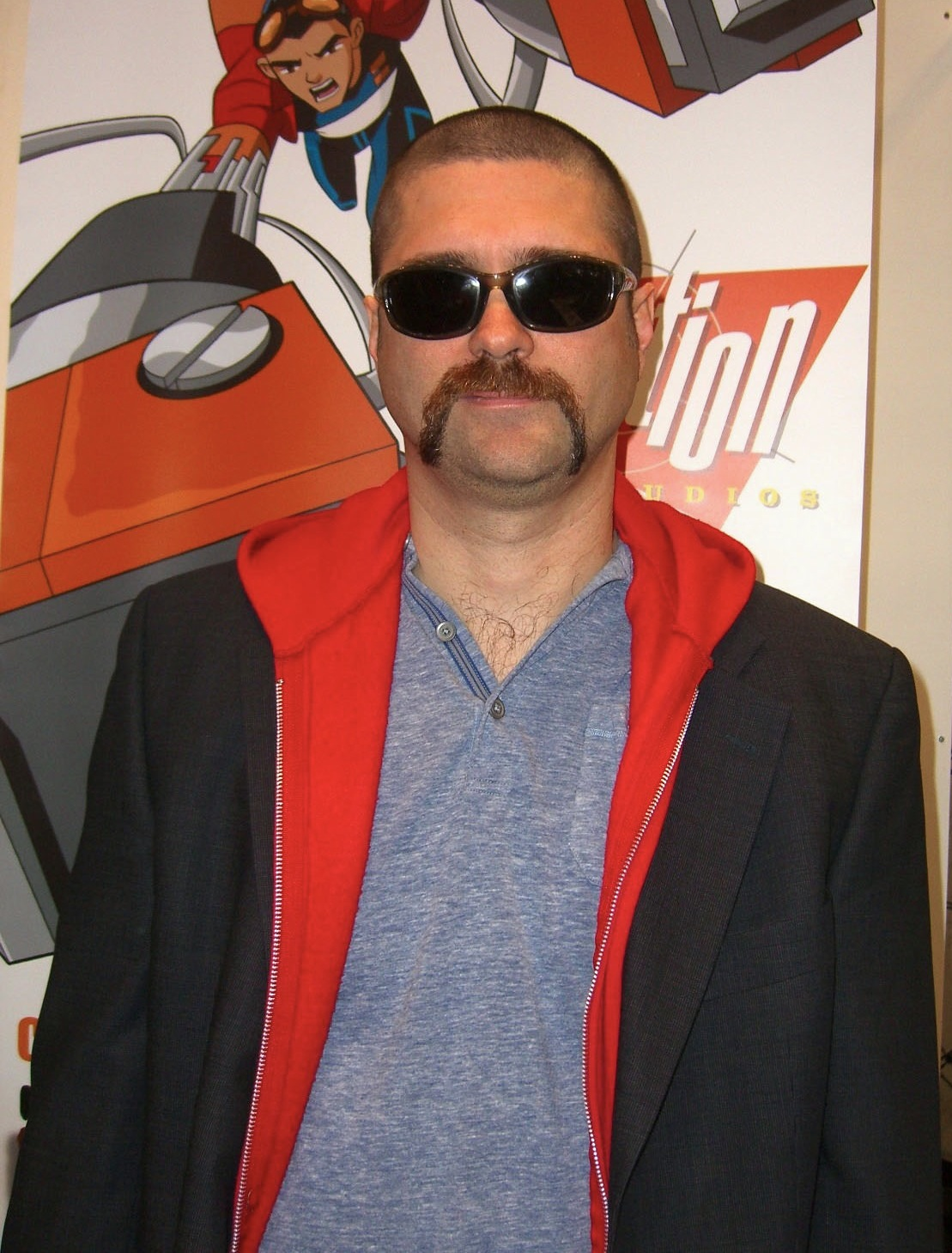
- Casey at the 2012 New York Comic Con
- Area: Writer
- Notable works: Cable; WildC.A.T.s; Gødland

Joe Casey is an American comic book writer. He has worked on titles such as Wildcats 3.0, Uncanny X-Men, The Intimates, Adventures of Superman, and G.I. Joe: America's Elite among others. As part of the comics creator group Man of Action Studios, Casey is one of the creators of the animated series Ben 10.

== Career ==
Starting his professional writing career at Marvel Comics, Casey wrote for several titles, including Cable, The Incredible Hulk and Uncanny X-Men. He is also the co-creator of the superhero America Chavez.

Casey wrote many titles for Wildstorm, like the highly experimental Automatic Kafka with artist Ashley Wood. Casey took over Wildcats and gave the series a new direction, moving it from the superhero genre to incorporate elements of corporate espionage. He wrote a Mister Majestic series with artist Ed McGuiness, after which they subsequently collaborated on Adventures of Superman, which Casey wrote for three years.

Casey wrote 2005's Avengers: Earth's Mightiest Heroes limited series and its sequel for Marvel Comics. Since 2001 Casey has produced creator-owned work through Image Comics, including Gødland, Codeflesh, Nixon's Pals, Charlatan Ball, Doc Bizarre, M.D., and Officer Downe. He also wrote a revamp of the original Youngblood miniseries by Rob Liefeld, called Maximum Youngblood. As well as discussing the ending of Gødland, Charlatan Ball and Nixon's Pals, he mentioned that Codeflesh would be returning.

Casey was featured in a 2006 documentary about the 1990s comic boom and bust called Adventures Into Digital Comics.

Casey is a member of the Man of Action collective of creators (with Joe Kelly, Duncan Rouleau, and Steven T. Seagle), who created the Ben 10 franchise. They also created the show Generator Rex, which also ran for two seasons on Cartoon Network. Man of Action's members were producers and story editors on the shows Ultimate Spider-Man and Avengers Assemble, both airing on Disney XD. Casey also co-created the animated property Disco Destroyer with Scott Mosier and Jim Mahfood.

Dark Reign: Zodiac pits a new iteration of the old Avengers enemies against Norman Osborn's new status quo as Director of National Security, and Final Crisis: Aftermath: Dance follows the adventures of the Super Young Team. Casey's brief return to DC also included a brief run on Superman/Batman.

Casey's next work for Image Comics, with Mike Huddleston on art duties, was Butcher Baker: The Righteous Maker. The critically acclaimed series ended with issue #8, which was published on August 15, 2012, ten months after issue #7, a delay that Casey stated was due to Huddleston having overcommitted himself. Huddleston responded to Casey's public statement by stating that the delay was caused by his need to take over work in order to make sufficient money, as Butcher Baker was not lucrative enough for him to avoid doing so. Huddleston further explained that he apologized to Casey and to fans for the delay.

That same year, Casey debuted the six-issue Marvel miniseries Vengeance, which introduced a group of new villains to the Marvel Universe. The hardcover collection was released in December 2012.

His other work includes the creator-owned series Sex and The Bounce for Image Comics, as well as Catalyst Comix for Dark Horse Comics, reviving many of the old Comics Greatest World superheroes from the 1990s.

A film called Officer Downe, based on Casey's comic, was released in 2016.

== Bibliography ==
=== Early work ===
- Comic Effect #11 (a Superman/Aliens review, fanzine, 1995)
- San Diego Comic Convention Program #22: "I Could Have Been a Teenage Comic Book Writer" (essay, SDCC, 1995)
- The Chosen #1–2 (co-written by Casey and José Martínez, art by Paul Martínez and Jonathan Jay Lee, Prolix Press, 1995)
- The Harvest King #1–3 (with Mike Macropoulos, Caliber, 1998)

=== Marvel Comics ===
- X-Men:
  - Wolverine:
    - Wolverine: Days of Future Past #2–3 (script by Casey from story by John Francis Moore, art by Joe Bennett, 1998) collected in X-Men: Days of Future Past (hc, 392 pages, 2014, ISBN 0-7851-8442-2)
    - Wolverine: Black Rio (with Óscar Jiménez, graphic novel, 48 pages, 1998, ISBN 0-7851-0674-X) collected in Wolverine: Blood Wedding (tpb, 320 pages, 2013, ISBN 0-7851-8524-0)
  - X-Men vol. 2 #73: "The Elements within Us" (co-written by Casey and Joe Kelly, art by Jeff Johnson, 1998) collected in X-Men Gold: Homecoming (tpb, 336 pages, 2018, ISBN 1-302-90954-1)
  - Cable (with José Ladrönn, Germán García (#52), Ryan Benjamin (#56–57), Ed McGuinness (#58) and Stephen Platt (#62–63), 1998–1999) collected as:
    - The Hellfire Hunt (includes #51–58 and the Wolverine/Cable: Guts and Glory one-shot, tpb, 448 pages, 2017, ISBN 1-302-90785-9)
    - The Nemesis Contract (collects #59–70, tpb, 400 pages, 2018, ISBN 1-302-90948-7)
  - Alpha Flight vol. 2 (plot assist; scripted by Steven T. Seagle):
    - "Microcosm" (art by Ariel Olivetti, in #11, 1998)
    - Alpha Flight/Inhumans Annual '98 (co-written by Seagle and Mark Bernardo, art by Tom Raney, 1998)
  - Uncanny X-Men:
    - Uncanny X-Men/Fantastic Four Annual '98 (with Leandro Fernández and Paul Pelletier, 1998) collected in X-Men Blue: Reunion (tpb, 328 pages, 2018, ISBN 1-302-90953-3)
    - X-Men: The Magneto War (tpb, 504 pages, 2018, ISBN 1-302-91376-X) includes:
      - "A World Apart, Part One" (script by Casey from story by Alan Davis, art by Adam Kubert, in #368, 1999)
      - "A World Apart, Part Two" (script by Casey from story by Alan Davis, art by Davis, in X-Men vol. 2 #88, 1999)
    - X-Men: X-Corps (tpb, 464 pages, 2013, ISBN 0-7851-8502-X) collects:
      - "Playing God" (with Ian Churchill, in #394, 2001)
      - "Poptopia" (with Ian Churchill, Mel Rubi (#397) and Ashley Wood (#398), in #395–398, 2001)
      - "For Unlawful Carnal Knowledge" (with Tom Raney and Tom Derenick, in #399, 2001)
      - "Absolute Progeny" (with Ashley Wood, in Annual '01, 2001)
      - "Supreme Confessions" (with Cully Hamner, Ashley Wood, Eddie Campbell, Javier Pulido, Sean Phillips and Matthew Dow Smith, in #400, 2002)
      - "Rocktopia" (with Ron Garney, Aaron Lopresti (#403, 406) and Sean Phillips, in #401–409, 2002)
  - Juggernaut: The Eighth Day: "Eight is Enough" (with Terry Shoemaker, one-shot, 1999) collected in Thor by Dan Jurgens and John Romita, Jr. Volume 3 (tpb, 200 pages, 2010, ISBN 0-7851-4385-8)
  - Children of the Atom #1–6 (with Steve Rude, Paul Smith + Michael Ryan (#4) and Esad Ribić, 1999–2000) collected as X-Men: Children of the Atom (tpb, 160 pages, 2001, ISBN 0-7851-0805-X)
  - X-Men: Life Lessons (with John Paul Leon, one-shot, 2003)
- Hulk:
  - The Incredible Hulk #467 (two-page prologue), 468–474 (with Javier Pulido and Ed McGuinness (#470–471), 1998–1999)
  - Hulk Smash Avengers #2: "The Filth and the Fury" (with Max Fiumara, 2012) collected in Hulk Smash Avengers (tpb, 112 pages, 2012, ISBN 0-7851-6305-0)
- Thunderbolts #26: "Lockdown" (with Leonardo Manco, co-feature, 1999) collected in Hawkeye and the Thunderbolts Volume 1 (tpb, 456 pages, 2016, ISBN 0-7851-9528-9)
- Deathlok vol. 2 #1–11 (with Leonardo Manco, Eric Canete (#4, 7), Matthew Dow Smith (#6) and John Buscema (#10), 1999–2000) collected as Deathlok: Rage Against the Machine (tpb, 456 pages, 2015, ISBN 0-7851-9291-3)
- Iron Man:
  - Iron Man Annual '99: "Power Tools" (script by Casey from a plot by Kurt Busiek, art by Terry Shoemaker, 1999) collected in Iron Man by Kurt Busiek and Sean Chen Omnibus (hc, 1,024 pages, 2013, ISBN 0-7851-6814-1)
  - Iron Man: The Inevitable #1–6 (with Frazer Irving, 2006) collected as Iron Man: The Inevitable (tpb, 144 pages, 2006, ISBN 0-7851-2084-X)
  - Iron Man: Enter the Mandarin #1–6 (with Eric Canete, 2007–2008) collected as Iron Man: Enter the Mandarin (tpb, 144 pages, 2008, ISBN 0-7851-2622-8)
  - Iron Man 2: Public Identity (tpb, 144 pages, 2010, ISBN 0-7851-4858-2) includes:
    - Iron Man 2: Nick Fury, Director of S.H.I.E.L.D. (with Timothy Green II, digital one-shot, Marvel, 2010)
    - Iron Man 2: Phil Coulson, Agent of S.H.I.E.L.D. (with Felix Ruiz, digital one-shot, Marvel, 2010)
    - Iron Man 2: Black Widow, Agent of S.H.I.E.L.D. (with Matt Camp, digital one-shot, Marvel, 2010)
    - Iron Man 2: Public Identity #1–3 (plotted by Casey and Justin Theroux, scripted by Casey, art by Barry Kitson and Ron Lim, 2010)
- Captain America Annual '99: "Full Court Press" (with Pablo Raimondi, 1999) collected in Captain America: Land of the Free (tpb, 160 pages, 2013, ISBN 0-7851-6753-6)
- Heroes Reborn: Masters of Evil: "Battleship Downs" (with Charlie Adlard, one-shot, 2000) collected in Heroes Reborn: The Return (tpb, 288 pages, 2009, ISBN 0-7851-3748-3)
- Avengers:
  - Ultimate Collection: Avengers — Earth's Mightiest Heroes (tpb, 376 pages, 2012, ISBN 0-7851-5937-1) collects:
    - Avengers: Earth's Mightiest Heroes #1–8 (with Scott Kolins, 2005) also collected as Avengers: Earth's Mightiest Heroes (hc, 192 pages, 2005, ISBN 0-7851-1438-6)
    - Avengers: Earth's Mightiest Heroes II #1–8 (with Will Rosado, 2007) also collected as Avengers: Earth's Mightiest Heroes II (hc, 192 pages, 2007, ISBN 0-7851-1851-9)
  - Avengers: The Origin #1–5 (with Phil Noto, 2010) collected as Avengers: The Origin (hc, 144 pages, 2010, ISBN 0-7851-4356-4; tpb, 2012, ISBN 0-7851-4400-5)
- Fantastic Four: First Family #1–6 (with Chris Weston, 2006) collected as Fantastic Four: First Family (tpb, 144 pages, 2006, ISBN 0-7851-1703-2)
- The Last Defenders #1–6 (plotted by Casey and Keith Giffen, scripted by Casey, art by Jim Muniz, 2008) collected as The Last Defenders (tpb, 144 pages, 2008, ISBN 0-7851-2507-8)
- Dark Reign: Zodiac #1–3 (with Nathan Fox, 2009) collected in Dark Reign: The Underside (tpb, 256 pages, 2009, ISBN 0-7851-4160-X)
- Spider-Man:
  - The Amazing Spider-Man Family #8: "Walking the Talk" (with Chad Hardin, anthology, 2009)
  - Web of Spider-Man vol. 2 #7: "Fashion Spread" (with Jim Mahfood, anthology, 2010) collected in The Amazing Spider-Man: New York Stories (tpb, 152 pages, 2011, ISBN 0-7851-5637-2)
  - The Amazing Spider-Man #700.3–700.4 (with Timothy Green II, 2014) collected in The Amazing Spider-Man: Peter Parker, the One and Only (tpb, 168 pages, 2014, ISBN 0-7851-9010-4)
- Age of Heroes #4: "Welcome Back, Zodiac" (with Nathan Fox, anthology, 2010) collected in Age of Heroes (tpb, 104 pages, 2011, ISBN 0-7851-4724-1)
- Vengeance #1–6 (with Nick Dragotta, 2011–2012) collected as Vengeance (hc, 136 pages, 2012, ISBN 0-7851-5763-8; tpb, 2012, ISBN 0-7851-5764-6)

=== Image Comics ===
- Hellcop #1–4 (with Gilbert Monsanto, Avalon Studios, 1998–1999)
- Double Image #1–5: "Codeflesh" (with Charlie Adlard, anthology, 2001)
  - After the series cancellation, Codeflesh was continued in Double Take #6–8 (Funk-O-Tron, 2001–2002)
  - All eight installments were collected by AiT/Planet Lar as Codeflesh (tpb, 144 pages, 2003, ISBN 1-932051-15-5)
  - Reprinted, along with a new short story, as Codeflesh: The Definitive Edition (hc, 128 pages, 2009, ISBN 1-60706-077-9)
- Four Letter Worlds: "Funk" (with Mike Huddleston, anthology graphic novel, 144 pages, 2005, ISBN 1-58240-439-9)
- Gødland (with Tom Scioli, 2005–2013) collected as:
  - Gødland: Celestial Edition Volume 1 (collects #1–12, hc, 360 pages, 2007, ISBN 1-58240-832-7)
    - Includes the "Early Christmas" short story from Image Holiday Special 2005 (written by Casey, art by Tom Scioli, 2005)
  - Gødland: Celestial Edition Volume 2 (collects #13–24, hc, 360 pages, 2010, ISBN 1-60706-252-6)
  - Gødland: Celestial Edition Volume 3 (collects #25–36 and the Gødland Finale one-shot, hc, 360 pages, 2015, ISBN 1-63215-382-3)
- Pilot Season: Velocity (with Kevin Maguire, one-shot, Top Cow, 2007) collected in Pilot Season 2007 (tpb, 144 pages, 2008, ISBN 1-58240-900-5)
  - A four-issue limited series continuing the story from the one-shot was announced for 2008, with Casey joined by new artist ChrisCross.
  - The Casey/ChrisCross team reportedly completed the entire first issue before departing the series due to "creative differences".
  - The series was eventually released in 2010 with script by Ron Marz and art by Kenneth Rocafort.
- Youngblood:
  - Youngblood vol. 4 (with Derec Donovan, 2008–2009) collected as:
    - Focus Tested (collects #1–4, tpb, 96 pages, 2008, ISBN 1-58240-945-5)
    - Voted Off the Island (collects #5–8, tpb, 96 pages, 2010, ISBN 1-60706-003-5)
  - Youngblood Volume 1 (hc, 168 pages, 2008, ISBN 1-58240-858-0)
    - Reprints of the first five issues of Youngblood (original art by Rob Liefeld, 1992–1993) with new dialogue by Casey.
- The Next Issue Project: Fantastic Comics #24: "Flip Falcon in the Fourth Dimension" (with Bill Sienkiewicz, anthology, 2008)
- Krash Bastards (with Axel 13, graphic novel, 142 pages, 2008, ISBN 1-58240-905-6)
- Nixon's Pals (with Chris Burnham, graphic novel, 100 pages, 2008, ISBN 1-58240-937-4)
  - Reprinted in color and with bonus material as Nixon's Pals (hc, 120 pages, 2015, ISBN 1-63215-303-3)
- Charlatan Ball #1–6 (with Andy Suriano, 2008–2009) collected as Charlatan Ball (tpb, 160 pages, 2009, ISBN 1-60706-084-1)
- Officer Downe: "Tough Shit" (with Chris Burnham, one-shot, 2010)
  - Reprinted as Officer Downe: Bigger, Better, Bastard Edition (hc, 96 pages, 2012, ISBN 1-60706-477-4)
  - Reprinted with the film adaptation-related bonus material as Officer Downe (tpb, 120 pages, 2017, ISBN 1-5343-0119-4)
- Butcher Baker, the Righteous Maker #1–8 (with Mike Huddleston, 2011–2012) collected as Butcher Baker, the Righteous Maker (hc, 250 pages, 2012, ISBN 1-60706-652-1; tpb, 2017, ISBN 1-5343-0333-2)
- Ziggy Marley's Marijuanaman (script by Casey based on the concept by Ziggy Marley, art by Jim Mahfood, graphic novel, 48 pages, 2011, ISBN 1-60706-370-0)
- Doc Bizarre, M.D. (with Andy Suriano, graphic novel, 72 pages, 2011, ISBN 1-60706-455-3)
- Haunt (with Nathan Fox, Robbi Rodriguez (#25) and Kyle Strahm (#28), 2011–2012) collected as:
  - Volume 4 (collects #19–24, tpb, 160 pages, 2012, ISBN 1-60706-588-6)
  - Volume 5 (collects #25–30, tpb, 160 pages, cancelled, ISBN 1-60706-679-3)
    - The series ceased publication with issue #28, which had last two pages written and drawn by Todd McFarlane (owner of the book).
    - McFarlane was also listed as the writer of all subsequent issues, even though the Casey/Fox run has been solicited up to issue #31.
- The Bounce #1–12 (with David Messina, 2013–2014) collected as The Bounce: The Complete Edition (tpb, 270 pages, 2014, ISBN 1-63215-011-5)
- Sex (with Piotr Kowalski, Morgan Jeske (#9), Chris Peterson (#14), Dan McDaid (#17), Luke Parker (#18) and Ian McEwan (#19–20), 2013–2016) collected as:
  - The Summer of Hard (collects #1–8, tpb, 168 pages, 2013, ISBN 1-60706-784-6)
  - Supercool (collects #7–14, tpb, 128 pages, 2014, ISBN 1-63215-005-0)
  - Broken Toys (collects #15–20, tpb, 144 pages, 2015, ISBN 1-63215-228-2)
  - Daisy Chains (collects #21–26, tpb, 128 pages, 2016, ISBN 1-63215-677-6)
  - Reflexology (collects #27–34, tpb, 128 pages, 2017, ISBN 1-63215-904-X)
  - After issue #34, the series switched to the graphic novel format:
    - World Hunger (sc, 128 pages, 2019, ISBN 1-53430-877-6)
- Valhalla Mad #1–4 (with Paul Maybury, 2015) collected as Valhalla Mad (tpb, 120 pages, 2016, ISBN 1-63215-602-4)
- Annual (collection of never-before-reprinted and new material curated by Casey, 128 pages, 2017, ISBN 1-5343-0371-5)
  - "Modern Romance" (written by Casey, art by Nathan Fox)
  - "The Winternational" (written by Casey, art by Luke Parker)
  - "Odin's Mighty Return" (written by Casey, art by Jim Rugg)
  - "Slowpoke the Porcupine" (written and drawn by Max Casey)
  - "Gangsta Toads" (written and drawn by Dylan Casey)
  - "Swap Meat" (article) and "Colonel Kane and Abel" (written by Casey, art by Wilfredo Torres)
- New Lieutenants of Metal #1–4 (with Ulises Farinas, 2018) collected as New Lieutenants of Metal (tpb, 104 pages, 2019, ISBN 1-5343-0699-4)
- MCMLXXV #1–3 (with Ian McEwan, 2018) collected as MCMLXXV (tpb, 80 pages, 2019, ISBN 1-5343-1215-3)
- Jesusfreak (with Benjamin Marra, graphic novel, 64 pages, 2019, ISBN 1-5343-1174-2)
- All-America Comix (with Dustin Nguyen, one-shot, 2020)

=== DC Comics ===
- The Flash:
  - The Flash 80-Page Giant #2: "Successionary Modern" (with Ron Lim, anthology, 1999)
  - The Flash vol. 2 #151: "Territorealis" (with Duncan Rouleau, 1999) collected in DC Goes Ape (tpb, 168 pages, 2008, ISBN 1-4012-1935-7)
- Superman:
  - Superman Secret Files & Origins #2: "From the Desk of... Jimmy Olsen" (with Michael Avon Oeming, co-feature, 1999)
  - Superman 80-Page Giant #2: "Superman's Pal Jimmy Olsen: Who Do You Trust?" (with Michael Avon Oeming, anthology, 1999)
  - Adventures of Superman:
    - "Pillar of Earth" (with Mike S. Miller, in #587–588, 2001)
      - Issue #587 is scripted by Casey from J. M. DeMatteis' plot.
    - Superman: Return to Krypton (tpb, 208 pages, 2004, ISBN 1-4012-0194-6) includes:
      - "Return to Krypton, Part Two: Second Honeymoon" (with Duncan Rouleau, in #589, 2001)
      - "Return to Krypton II, Part Two: Culture Shock" (with Duncan Rouleau, in #606, 2002)
    - "Don't Cry for Me, Bialya" (with Derec Aucoin, in #590, 2001)
    - "Strange Behavior" (with Mike Wieringo, in #592, 2001)
    - Superman: Our Worlds at War (tpb, 512 pages, 2006, ISBN 1-4012-1129-1) includes:
      - "Our Worlds at War" (with Mike Wieringo, in #593–595, 2001)
    - "Shipbuilding" (with Mike Wieringo, in #596, 2001)
    - "Joker: Last Laugh — Rubber Crutch" (with Derec Aucoin, in #597, 2001)
    - "Cult of Persuasion (prologue)" (with Mike Wieringo, in #598, 2001)
    - "Borba Za Zhivuchest" (with Derec Aucoin, in #599, 2002)
    - "A Lex" (with Mike Wieringo, in #600, 2002)
    - "Cult of Persuasion" (with Pete Woods, in #601–602, 2002)
    - "Mirror, Mirror" (with Carlos Meglia, in #603–605, 2002)
    - Superman: Ending Battle (tpb, 192 pages, 2009, ISBN 1-4012-2259-5) includes:
      - "Ending Battle" (with Derec Aucoin, in #608–609, 2002)
    - "Small Perceptions" (with Derec Aucoin, in #610, 2003)
    - "In the Grip of the Hollow Men!" (with Derec Aucoin, in #612–616, 2003)
    - "Encyclopedia Universal" (with Charlie Adlard, in #617–618, 2003)
    - "Prestidigitation Nation" (with Derec Aucoin, in #619–620, 2003)
    - "The Chilling Prophecy of the Minuteman" (with Derec Aucoin, in #621–622, 2003–2004)
    - Superman: The Man of Steel — Believe (digest-sized tpb, 128 pages, 2013, ISBN 1-4012-4705-9) includes:
      - "Bittersweet" (with Derec Aucoin, in #623, 2004)
- Batman: Tenses #1–2 (with Cully Hamner, 2003)
- Final Crisis Aftermath: Dance #1–6 (with ChrisCross and Eduardo Pansica, 2009) collected as Final Crisis Aftermath: Dance (tpb, 144 pages, 2010, ISBN 1-4012-2605-1)
- Superman/Batman #64, 68–71 (with Scott Kolins (#64) and Ardian Syaf, 2009–2010) collected in Superman/Batman Volume 6 (tpb, 328 pages, 2017, ISBN 1-4012-7503-6)
  - Casey was fired off the book after he harshly commented on DC's decision to brand his first arc on the series as a tie-in to Our Worlds at War, a then-8-year-old event.
  - Issues #70–71 were completed by a different creative team (script by Joshua Williamson, art by Jason Fabok), with Casey credited as "co-writer".

==== Wildstorm ====
- Gen^{13}:
  - Gen^{13} #42: "Chang... Percival Chang" (with Kevin Maguire, 1999)
  - Wild Times: Gen^{13}: "Still Waters Run Deep" (with Jason Johnson, one-shot, 1999)
- Mr. Majestic (co-written by Casey and Brian Holguin):
  - "Cosmology" (with Ed McGuinness, in #1–6, 1999–2000) collected as Mr. Majestic (tpb, 176 pages, 2002, ISBN 1-56389-659-1)
  - "Universal Law" (with Eric Canete, in #7–9, 2000)
- Wildcats:
  - Wildcats vol. 2 (with Bryan Hitch (#5), Travis Charest (#6), Sean Phillips and Steve Dillon (#20–21), 1999–2001) collected as:
    - Street Smart (includes #5–6, hc, 160 pages, 2000, ISBN 1-56389-685-0; tpb, 2002, ISBN 1-56389-658-3)
      - Both issues are scripted by Casey from Scott Lobdell's plots.
    - Vicious Circles (collects #7–13, tpb, 144 pages, 2001, ISBN 1-56389-761-X)
    - Serial Boxes (collects #14–19, tpb, 144 pages, 2001, ISBN 1-56389-766-0)
    - Battery Park (collects #20–28, tpb, 224 pages, 2003, ISBN 1-4012-0035-4)
  - Wildcats: Ladytron (with Eric Canete and Jason Johnson, one-shot, 2000)
  - Wildcats Annual '00: "Devil's Night, Part Three" (with Lee Bermejo, 2000)
  - Wildcats 3.0 (with Dustin Nguyen, Sean Phillips, Francisco Ruiz Velasco (#17–18), Pasqual Ferry (#19) and Duncan Rouleau, 2002–2004) collected as:
    - Year One (collects #1–12, tpb, 288 pages, 2010, ISBN 1-4012-2856-9)
    - Year Two (collects #13–24, tpb, 288 pages, 2011, ISBN 1-4012-3050-4)
  - Coup D'Etat #3: "Henhouse Confidential" (with Alé Garza, Eye of the Storm, 2004) collected in Coup D'Etat (tpb, 112 pages, 2004, ISBN 1-4012-0570-4)
- The Authority Annual '00: "Devil's Night, Part Two" (with Cully Hamner, 2000) collected in The Authority: Earth Inferno and Other Stories (tpb, 192 pages, 2002, ISBN 1-56389-854-3)
- Automatic Kafka #1–9 (with Ashley Wood, Eye of the Storm, 2002–2003)
- The Intimates #1–12 (co-created by Casey and Jim Lee; written by Casey, art by Lee, Giuseppe Camuncoli, Scott Iwahashi (#9–10), Carlos D'Anda (#10, 12) and Alé Garza (#11–12), 2005)
- Tom Strong #33: "The Journey Within" (with Ben Oliver, America's Best Comics, 2005) collected in Tom Strong Book Six (hc, 160 pages, 2006, ISBN 1-4012-1108-9; tpb, 2008, ISBN 1-4012-1109-7)

=== Dark Horse Comics ===
- 9-11 Volume 1: "Uncertain Process" (with Sean Phillips, anthology graphic novel, 196 pages, 2002, ISBN 1-56389-881-0)
- KISS #1–6 (with Mel Rubi, 2002–2003) collected in KISS Kompendium (hc, 1,200 pages, HarperCollins, 2009, ISBN 0-06-172819-5)
- Reveal: "Autopilot" (with Sean Phillips, anthology one-shot, 2002)
- Hellboy: Weird Tales #2: "Flight Risk" (with Steve Parkhouse, anthology, 2003) collected in Hellboy: Weird Tales Volume 1 (tpb, 128 pages, 2003, ISBN 1-56971-622-6)
- Star Wars Tales #17: "Phantom Menaces" (with Francisco Paronzini, anthology, 2003) collected in Star Wars Tales Volume 5 (tpb, 248 pages, 2005, ISBN 1-59307-286-4)
- The Milkman Murders #1–4 (with Steve Parkhouse, 2004) collected as The Milkman Murders (tpb, 104 pages, 2005, ISBN 1-59307-080-2; hc, Image, 2012, ISBN 1-60706-609-2)
- Dark Horse Presents (anthology):
  - MySpace Dark Horse Presents #11: "New Game" (with Pop Mhan, 2008) collected in MySpace Dark Horse Presents Volume 2 (tpb, 168 pages, 2009, ISBN 1-59582-248-8)
  - Dark Horse Presents vol. 3 #5: "Odin's Mighty Return" (with Jim Rugg, 2014) collected in Annual (tpb, 128 pages, Image, 2017, ISBN 1-5343-0371-5)
- Catalyst Comix #1–9 (with Dan McDaid, Paul Maybury and Ulises Farinas, 2013–2014) collected as Catalyst Comix (tpb, 284 pages, 2014, ISBN 1-61655-345-6)

=== Other publishers ===
- Battle Pope: Wrath of God #1–3: "Immigrant Song" (with Jason Latour, co-feature, Funk-O-Tron, 2002)
- Hip Flask (dialogue assist; series of one-shots written by Richard Starkings and drawn by José Ladrönn, Active Images):
  - Hip Flask: Unnatural Selection (2002) reprinted with bonus material as Hip Flask: Unnatural Selection (hc, 48 pages, 2003, ISBN 0-9740567-0-7)
  - Hip Flask: Elephantmen (2003) collected in Hip Flask: Concrete Jungle (hc, 96 pages, Image, 2007, ISBN 1-58240-679-0)
- Devil's Due:
  - Infantry #1–4 (with Clément Sauvé, Giancarlo Caracuzzo (#3) and Jim Muniz (#4), Aftermath, 2004–2005)
  - G.I. Joe: America's Elite (with Stefano Caselli, Nelson Blake II and Joshua Medors, 2005–2006) collected as:
    - The Newest War (includes #0–5, tpb, 160 pages, 2006, ISBN 1-932796-48-7)
    - The Ties That Bind (collects #6–12, tpb, 192 pages, 2006, ISBN 1-932796-55-X)
    - In Sheep's Clothing (collects #13–18, tpb, 176 pages, 2007, ISBN 1-932796-79-7)
  - Zen the Intergalactic Ninja: "The Almighty Unexpected" (with Lee Ferguson, co-feature in one-shot, 2008)
- AiT/Planet Lar:
  - Full Moon Fever (co-written by Casey and Caleb Gerard, art by Damian Couceiro, graphic novel, 88 pages, 2005, ISBN 1-932051-35-X)
  - Rock Bottom (with Charlie Adlard, graphic novel, sc, 112 pages, 2006, ISBN 1-932051-45-7; hc, Image, 2012, ISBN 1-60706-619-X)
- Boom! Studios:
  - The Black Plague (with Julia Bax, one-shot, 2006)
  - What Were They Thinking?!: Monster Mash-Up: "Barry's Secret Shame!" (over art by Steve Ditko, anthology one-shot, 2006)
    - The story is a "remix" of "The Green Unknown" from Mysteries of Unexplored Worlds #19 (1960) with new humorous dialogue.
    - Collected in What Were They Thinking?! (tpb, 128 pages, 2008, ISBN 1-934506-07-9)
  - Pirate Tales: "The Walk" (with Jean-Jacques Dzialowski, anthology one-shot, 2006)
- Heroes #39–42: "Betty" (with Ryan Odagawa, weekly webcomic published at NBC.com, 2007) collected in Heroes Volume 2 (hc, 240 pages, Wildstorm, 2008, ISBN 1-4012-1925-X; tpb, 2009, ISBN 1-4012-2229-3)
- Dynamite:
  - Project Superpowers (co-plotted by Casey and Alex Ross, written by Casey):
    - The Death-Defying 'Devil #1–4 (with Edgar Salazar, 2008–2009) collected as The Death-Defying 'Devil (tpb, 104 pages, 2009, ISBN 1-60690-078-1)
    - Project Superpowers: Meet the Bad Guys #1–4 (with Jonathan Lau, Mike Lilly, Carlos Paul and Jack Herbert, 2009) collected as Project Superpowers: Meet the Bad Guys (tpb, 112 pages, 2010, ISBN 1-60690-104-4)
  - Captain Victory and the Galactic Rangers vol. 3 #1–6 (with Nathan Fox and various artists, 2014–2015) collected as Captain Victory and the Galactic Rangers (tpb, 168 pages, 2016, ISBN 1-5241-0008-0)
  - Jonny Quest (2024 - ongoing)
  - Ben 10 (2026 - ongoing)
- Flash Gordon 75th Anniversary: "Freedom Flight (Little Wing)" (with Omaha Pérez, anthology graphic novel, 80 pages, Ardden Entertainment, 2010, ISBN 0-9561259-2-1)
- Playboy #2014–01/02: "Modern Romance" (with Nathan Fox, six-page co-feature, 2014) collected in Annual (tpb, 128 pages, Image, 2017, ISBN 1-5343-0371-5)
- Miami Vice Remix #1–5 (with Jim Mahfood, IDW Publishing, 2015) collected as Miami Vice Remix (tpb, 148 pages, 2015, ISBN 1-63140-465-2)
- The Winternational #1–12 (with Luke Parker, webcomic, Stela, 2016) collected in Annual (tpb, 128 pages, Image, 2017, ISBN 1-5343-0371-5)
- Lion Forge:
  - Accell #1–21 (with Damion Scott and Ramon Bachs, 2017–2019) partially collected in:
    - Home Schooling (collects #1–4, tpb, 144 pages, 2017, ISBN 1-941302-37-8)
    - Pop Quiz (collects #5–9, tpb, 144 pages, 2018, ISBN 1-941302-75-0)
    - Turf Battles (collects #10–14, tpb, 144 pages, 2018, ISBN 1-941302-79-3)
    - Slipstream Dream (collects #15–19, tpb, 144 pages, 2019, ISBN 1-941302-91-2)
  - Incidentals (with Larry Stroman and Will Rosado, 2017–2018) collected as:
    - Powers, Lies and Secrets (collects #1–4, tpb, 152 pages, 2018, ISBN 1-941302-64-5)
    - Balance of Power (collects #5–9, tpb, 144 pages, 2018, ISBN 1-941302-82-3)
  - KINO (with Jefte Palo, ChrisCross and Chris Batista (#9), 2017–2018) collected as:
    - Escape from the Abyss (collects #1–4, tpb, 152 pages, 2018, ISBN 1-941302-65-3)
    - The End of All Lies (collects #5–9, tpb, 144 pages, 2018, ISBN 1-941302-83-1)

Preceded by Peter David	The Incredible Hulk writer 1998–1999	Succeeded by John Byrne
Preceded by Scott Lobdell	Uncanny X-Men writer 2001–2002	Succeeded by Chuck Austen
