= Richard Starkings =

British font designer

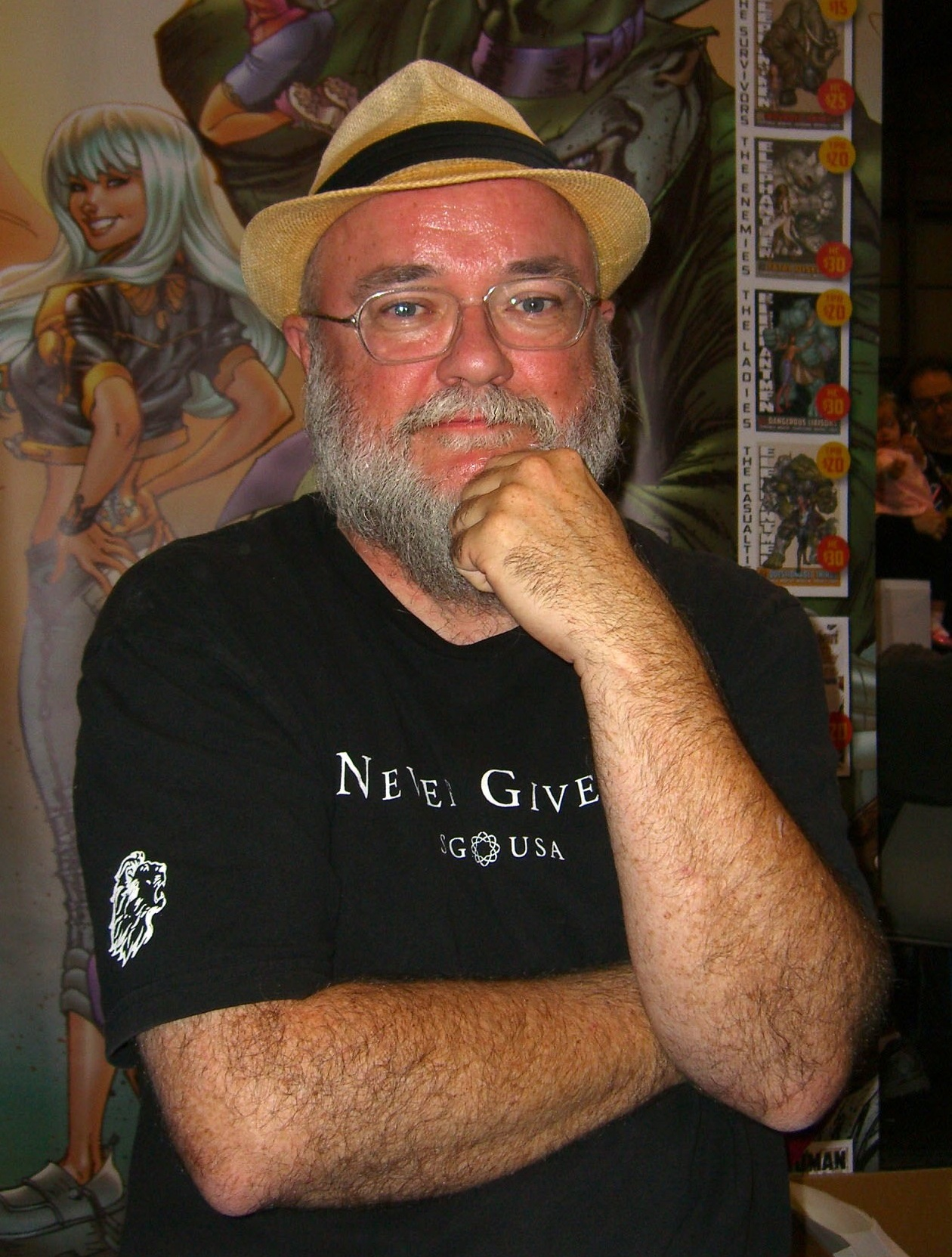
- Starkings at the 2011 New York Comic Con
- Born: Richard Alan Starkings; 27 January 1962 (age 64) Liverpool, England, UK
- Areas: Letterer, editor, writer
- Pseudonyms: Richard Alan, Zed
- Notable works: Hip Flask; Elephantmen
- Awards: Inkpot Award (2015)

Richard Starkings (born 27 January 1962) is a British font designer and comic book letterer, editor and writer. He was one of the early pioneers of computer-based comic-book lettering, and is one of the most prolific creators in that industry.

== Career ==
Starkings' lettering style was originally inspired by British comic strip letterers Bill Nuttall and Tom Frame. Starkings' UK career began with lettering jobs in 2000 AD's Future Shocks and various strips in Warrior. From there he moved to Marvel UK where he lettered Zoids in Spider-Man Weekly and Transformers before becoming an editor for the company in the late 1980s. Titles he edited included Death's Head and Dragon's Claws. However, by the beginning of the 1990s he devoted himself exclusively to lettering, finding work in the much larger comic-book industry in the United States.

His work in the Whoniverse has been mostly confined to two periods. He was variously a writer, editor and letterer during the Sixth and early Seventh Doctors' eras in the pages of Doctor Who Magazine. At this time, he also served in the staff position of "picture consultant" for a number of issues. Two decades later, he returned to the newly created American centre of Whoniverse publishing at IDW Publishing, working on several issues involving the Tenth Doctor.

=== In the 20th century ===
Starkings edited Redemption!, Culture Shock!, Nemesis of the Daleks and Follow That TARDIS!. Usually under his pseudonym of Richard Alan or Zed, he wrote or co-wrote Time and Tide, the aforementioned Nemesis of the Daleks and Up Above the Gods. He lettered or co-lettered Frobisher's Story, The Gift, The World Shapers and Up Above the Gods.

=== In the 21st century ===
For the BBC Wales era of the Whoniverse, Starkings co-wrote Cold-Blooded War under his own name. It was also a story he lettered, along with The Whispering Gallery and most issues of The Forgotten. He was also one of the letterers on Rift War!

Beginning in 2014, he and Comicraft's Jimmy Betancourt lettered all of Titan Comics' Doctor Who comic book series.

In 1992 Starkings founded Comicraft, a studio which trains and employs letterers and designers and provides "Unique Design and Fine Lettering" services for comic books from many different publishers. In the mid-1990s Comicraft, online as comicbookfonts.com began to sell their Font designs as software applications through their Active Images publishing company.

== Hip Flask ==
Originally Starkings had intended that the advertisements for these fonts would feature Marvel and DC Comics' characters, however when he failed to receive the authorisation to do that, Starkings created his own character to illustrate the ads – Hip Flask an anthropomorphic hippopotamus "Information Agent". Hip Flask has since graduated to his own series of one-shot comic books, published by Active Images. Starkings plotted the first two issues with artist Ladrönn and enlisted the assistance of Joe Casey to co-script. Mystery City and all subsequent issues are plotted and scripted by Starkings. In 2006 Image Comics launched an ongoing prequel series to Hip Flask, Elephantmen, written by Starkings and illustrated by Axel Medellin, Justin "Moritat" Norman, Marian Churchland, Tom Scioli, Henry Flint, Chris Bachalo and Chris Burnham.

In 2001 the character's similarities with an Australian comic book character called Hairbutt (a bumbling anthropomorphic hippopotamus private detective) led Hairbutt co-creator Bodine Amerikah and Darren Close of OzComics to accuse Hip Flask creator Starkings of plagiarism. Starkings replied that he created Hip Flask without any knowledge of Hairbutt, and that their similarities were a bizarre coincidence.

== Elephantmen ==
Elephantmen is an American ongoing monthly comic book published by Image Comics and written by Richard Starkings with art by Moritat and a number of other artists. Issue #1 was released in July 2006.

- Elephantmen, vol. 0: Armed Forces- Collects Elephantmen: War Toys #1-3 Elephantmen: Yvette, Elephantmen #34-35. Softcover: ISBN 978-1-60706-514-2 Hardcover: ISBN 978-1-60706-468-8
- Elephantmen, vol. 1: Wounded Animals - Collects Elephantmen #1-7. Softcover: ISBN 1-58240-934-X Hardcover: ISBN 1-58240-691-X
- Elephantmen, vol. 2: Fatal Diseases - Collects Elephantmen #8-15 & The Pilot. Softcover: ISBN 1-60706-177-5 Hardcover: ISBN 1-58240-915-3
- Elephantmen: Damaged Goods - Collects Elephantmen #18-20. Softcover: ISBN 978-1-60706-137-3
- Elephantmen, vol. 3: Dangerous Liaisons - Collects Elephantmen #16-23. Softcover: ISBN 1-60706-268-2 Hardcover: ISBN 1-60706-250-X
- Elephantmen, vol. 4: Questionable Things - Collects Elephantmen #24-30. Softcover: ISBN 978-1-60706-393-3 Hardcover: ISBN 978-1-60706-364-3
- Elephantmen, vol. 5: Devilish Functions - Collects Elephantmen #31-33 and 36-39. Softcover: ISBN 978-1-60706-614-9 Hardcover: ISBN 978-1-60706-576-0
- Elephantmen, vol. 6: Earthly Desires - Collects Elephantmen #40-49. Softcover: ISBN 978-1-60706-786-3 Hardcover: ISBN 978-1-60706-752-8
- Elephantmen, Mammoth Vol. 1 - Collects Elephantmen: War Toys #1-3 Elephantmen: Yvette, Elephantmen #1-11, #34-35, #57. Softcover: ISBN 978-1-63215-004-2
- Elephantmen, Mammoth Vol. 2 - Collects Elephantmen #12-30. Softcover: ISBN 978-1-63215-881-9
- Elephantmen, Mammoth Vol. 3 - Collects Elephantmen #31-50. Softcover: ISBN 978-1-5343-0825-1
- Elephantmen: 2260 vol. 1: Memories of the Future - Collects Elephantmen #51-55. Softcover: ISBN 978-1-60706-959-1
- Elephantmen: 2260 vol. 2: The Red Queen - Collects Elephantmen #58-62. Softcover: ISBN 978-1-63215-251-0
- Elephantmen: 2260 vol. 3: Learning to be Human - Collects Elephantmen #50, 56-57, 64-65. Softcover: ISBN 978-1-63215-533-7
- Elephantmen: 2260 vol. 4: All Coming Evil - Collects Elephantmen #65-69. Softcover: ISBN 978-1-63215-805-5
- Elephantmen: 2260 vol. 5: Up Close and Personal - Collects Elephantmen #70-71, 73-76. Softcover: ISBN 978-1-63215-880-2
- Elephantmen: 2260 vol. 6: The Least, The Lost & The Last - Collects Elephantmen #72, 77-80. Softcover: ISBN 978-1-5343-0188-7
- Elephantmen: 2261 vol. 1: The Death of Shorty. Softcover: ISBN 978-0-9766761-7-1
