= The Intimates =

Comic book series

- Cover of the 1st issue

Publication information
- Publisher: Wildstorm
- Schedule: Monthly
- Format: Limited series
- Publication date: January - December 2005
- No. of issues: 12
- Main character(s): Punchy; Destra; Duke; Empty Vee; Kefong; Sykes

Creative team
- Created by: Joe Casey; Jim Lee; Giuseppe Camuncoli
- Written by: Joe Casey
- Penciller(s): Giuseppe Camuncoli; Jim Lee; Scott Iwahashi; Carlos D'Anda; Alé Garza
- Inker: Sandra Hope
- Letterer(s): Richard Starkings; Rob Steen
- Colorist: Randy Mayor
- Editor(s): Ben Abernathy; Alex Sinclair

The Intimates was a twelve-issue American comic book limited series, written by Joe Casey and published by DC Comics' Wildstorm imprint. The series was created by Joe Casey, Jim Lee and Giuseppe Camuncoli.

The Intimates followed the lives of superpowered teenagers and their lives in a school for superheroes. It focused on the characters behind the superpowers and their lives rather than missions or action-oriented conflicts seen in most superhero comics.

The series was known for its "information overload" storytelling style, with "pop-up" panels and "info scrolls" at the bottom of each page, providing small facts about the events taking place, such as glimpses into a character's history or random "facts." One issue featured a fake ad for the food given away at the Seminary, "chemically treated to calm ALL overactive behavior!"

== History ==
The series was an instant critical hit, but would suffer from slow sales its entire life. Originally Lee provided covers and occasional panels, with Camuncoli providing the rest of the art. However, Lee's contributions became less and less frequent as the book went on, until he finally left to join Frank Miller on All Star Batman and Robin the Boy Wonder. Camuncoli would stay on longer, but also eventually left to draw Batman and the Captain Atom: Armageddon mini-series detailing the Worldstorm storyline.

Destra, Punchy and Duke later appeared in The Authority.

== Cast ==
The main cast are six superpowered teens who share a homeroom at The Seminary.

Punchy
A teenager with an affinity for "Super Espionage Boom" comics who uses a Punching Nun puppet of mysterious origin. The puppet allows him to generate a giant red fist capable of knocking down trees or punching through steel doors. He secretly holds feelings for Destra, but she acts indifferent.
Destra
A fashionista who gained explosive fingernail clippings and invulnerability due to a romantic liaison with her alien boyfriend. Her father is one of The Seminary's biggest contributors. Throughout the series, she explores her suspicion that the food served at The Seminary is chemically treated to control student behavior.
Duke
A super-strong and invulnerable All-American boy. The staff at The Seminary believes in his potential as a superhero, but Duke is reluctant. His father is an overbearing redneck who enjoys shooting propane tanks, and encourages his son to not "take any crap!".
Empty Vee
(a pun on MTV) Extremely shy and quiet, Vee was exposed to a meteorite that crashed in her backyard. She was rendered permanently invisible, but able to become visible at will. She has a crush on Punchy for the first three issues, but he rejects her advances.
Kefong
Kefong is a late student whose powers allow him to create "temporal bubbles," which can protect him from mental subversion or cause others to vomit. His character is modeled after Dean Martin and Bruce Lee. He is also an accomplished breakdancer.
Sykes
Sykes is the result of brain experiments by his parents. He wears technology that creates a "null field" around his head; if this is turned off, the immediate area is enveloped in a psychedelic madness. He appears catatonic, never speaking and rarely acknowledging the world around him. It was revealed in issue #6 that his uncle sexually assaulted him.
