= Pretty, Baby, Machine =

Comic book, limited series

- Cover of the first issue

Publication information
- Publisher: Shadowline (Image Comics)
- Schedule: Monthly
- Format: Limited series
- Genre: Crime
- Publication date: May – July 2008
- No. of issues: 3
- Main character(s): Pretty Boy Floyd; Baby Face Nelson; Machine Gun Kelly

Creative team
- Created by: Clark Westerman; Kody Chamberlain
- Written by: Clark Westerman
- Artist: Kody Chamberlain
- Letterer: Ed Dukeshire
- Editor: Kristen Simon

Pretty, Baby, Machine (also known as Pretty Baby Machine) is a three-issue comic book limited series written by Clark Westerman with art by Kody Chamberlain, and released by Image Comics through their ShadowLine studio in 2008.

The title refers to the three protagonists: Pretty Boy Floyd, Baby Face Nelson, and Machine Gun Kelly.

== Plot ==
In 1933, three famous outlaws come together to fight Al Capone.

== Adaptation ==
Landscape Entertainment has acquired the rights to produce a film version. No further progress was made on the project and is presumably canceled.
