= Kody Chamberlain =

American comic book artist

- Born: December 15, 1972 (age 53) Thibodaux, Louisiana
- Areas: Penciller, Inker, Colourist

Kody Chamberlain (born December 15, 1972) is an American comic book artist. He was born in Thibodaux, Louisiana and relocated to Lafayette, Louisiana in 1993.

== Biography ==
Chamberlain started his comic book career with Digital Webbing Presents issue #13 with writer Troy Wall. He was the featured artist in Digital Webbing Presents #19, the first full color issue of the popular anthology with a short story titled Sherman Danger with horror writer Steve Niles. Chamberlain continued to work with writer Steve Niles on IDW Publishing's 30 Days of Night: Bloodsucker Tales for all eight issues of the limited series.

== Bibliography ==
=== Comics ===
- Digital Webbing Presents (issue 13 published by Digital Webbing; short story titled "Intrinsic Dreams" with writer Troy Wall; story, pencils and inks)
- Digital Webbing Presents (issue 19 published by Digital Webbing; pencils, inks and colors)
- 30 Days of Night: Bloodsucker Tales (issues 1 through 8 from IDW Publishing; pencils, inks and colors)
- BloodRayne: Seeds of Sin (one shot with writer Christina Z published by Echo 3 Worldwide and Digital Webbing; pencils, inks and colors)
- Event Horizon (anthology story titled "Vanishing Herd" with writer Dan Wickline from Mam Tor Publishing; pencils, inks and colors)
- Tag (miniseries; BOOM! Studios with writer Keith Giffen. Covers for issues 1 through 3; pencils, inks, colors and logo design. Issue 1; pencils, inks and colors. Issue 2, pages 1 through 7; pencils and inks)
- newuniversal: 1959 (with Kieron Gillen, one-shot, Marvel Comics, September 2008)
- Sweets: A New Orleans Crime Story: 2006 (Artist/writer with editor Andrew Brinkley)
- Pretty, Baby, Machine with Clark Westerman, three issues, Image Comics, 2008

=== Graphic Novels ===
- Beowulf (with Stefan Petrucha as author), issued 2007 by HarperCollins
