= Elephantmen =

American monthly comic book

Publication information
- Publisher: Comiccraft (Image Comics)
- Schedule: Monthly
- Format: Ongoing series
- Publication date: July 2006
- No. of issues: 80

Creative team
- Written by: Richard Starkings; Tom Scioli; Joe Kelly; Jill Freshney
- Artist(s): Moritat; Chris Bachalo; Rob Steen; Chris Burnham
- Letterer: Richard Starkings
- Colorist(s): Moritat; Nick Filardi; Aron Lusen; Gregory Wright

Collected editions
- Wounded Animals: ISBN 978-1-58240-691-6
- Fatal Diseases: ISBN 978-1-60706-177-9
- Dangerous Liaisons: ISBN 978-1-60706-268-4
- Damaged Goods: ISBN 978-1-60706-137-3
- No Surrender: ISBN 978-1-58240-980-1
- Enemy Species: ISBN 978-1-60706-351-3

Elephantmen is an American ongoing monthly comic book published by Image Comics and written by Richard Starkings with art by Moritat and a number of other artists. Issue #1 was released in July 2006.

== Overview ==
Some 200 years from now, the MAPPO Corporation, headed by Japanese scientist Kazushi Nikken, breeds human/animal hybrids in a secret facility in North Africa. The Hybrids are composed of numerous African animal species including warthogs, elephants, camels, zebras, rhinos, hippos, giraffes, hyenas and crocodiles. The process involves implanting embryos into the wombs of kidnapped local women who are disposed of after giving birth. Each child is branded after birth, marking them as MAPPO property.

The Elephantmen are trained from birth to be super soldiers and killers. They are indoctrinated with an Orwellian mindset to think of themselves as property of the MAPPO Corporation and to deny free thought.

Upon discovering these experiments, the United Nations send in an army to storm MAPPO's secret base. Ultimately, the U.N. succeed in subduing the Elephantmen and the MAPPO personnel are arrested. The Elephantmen are rehabilitated and released to establish their own lives in the outside world, where they are generally distrusted by humans.

Living with humans proves to be incredibly difficult for the Elephantmen. The war in which they fought had great consequences as people from both sides (Elephantmen included) lost many loved ones. Not all of those who survived retained their sanity; in fact, some become active hunters who track down and kill Elephantmen. The Elephantmen themselves show some level of regret towards what they did during the conflict. It is also evident that crimes such as the ivory trade are seen as a good excuse to commit murder, and that even the Elephantmen themselves are involved with the seedy underworld and drug abuse. Women who befriend and become romantically involved with the Elephantmen are treated as outsiders, frowned upon, yet some have nightmares about their offspring and the chances of survival during childbirth.

== Publication history ==
The Elephantmen series is a spin-off from the series Hip Flask, set in the same universe and expanding on details of various minor characters from that series. Elephantmen: War Toys is a three-issue mini-series prequel.

== Characters ==
=== Elephantmen ===
- Hieronymus (Hip) Flask - Hippopotamus Hybrid Flask #7A. Hip Flask's tattoo is distorted by a scar so that "Hippopotamus Hybrid Flask #7A" instead reads just "Hip Flask #7A", hence his name. A product of the Human/Animal hybrid research of The MAPPO Corporation, Hip Flask is a walking, talking hippopotamus who works as an advisor for the Information Agency, a government body tasked with monitoring data and information as an aid to law enforcement. He is partnered by a beautiful young woman named Vanity Case who seems to have romantic feelings towards him (much to Hip's embarrassment), and befriends a cab-driver Miki to whom he becomes mutually attracted. Despite some bumps along the way, Hip and Miki form a true romance, which he deeply appreciates and cherishes but it still scares him what being with him could do to Miki. Despite his traumatic childhood, Hip Flask is shown to be a calm, kind and friendly individual, unlike many of the other Elephantmen who display a great deal of bitterness. Hip Flask was possibly the only Elephantman who dared to ask questions during his childhood education, for which he was placed in solitary confinement. It is eventually revealed that Hip is Sahara's younger half-brother because he was born from her mother.
- Ebenezer Hide - An elephant hybrid. "Ebony" works in the Information Agency with Hip Flask. Overcome with depression, he relies heavily on drugs to relive his prime, both mentally and sexually. Possibly as a result of PTSD and the drugs he uses, Ebony has vivid dreams of warrior fantasies, his favorite comic being Conan the Barbarian. He lost his legs due to serious injuries and uses a hovering wheelchair.
- Tusk - A warthog hybrid. He was driven to insanity due to MAPPO's extensive chemical experimentation to see if the Elephantmen could withstand poisons and harsh chemicals. His body did withstand it, but his mind could not. After the Elephantmen were "liberated", Tusk resided at the Elephantmen hospital in downtown Santa Monica until he escaped by mistake. He wandered near some docks and came across a senile old lady, looking for her "Joe", and saved her from falling off the pier. The woman offered him food and shelter, to Tusk's appreciation for her kindness despite his maddened mind. Unfortunately, Trench and three cops mistook Tusk for holding the woman hostage and killed him.
- Casbah Joe - A camel hybrid who runs a floating restaurant/nightclub called the Eye of the Needle.
- Obadiah Horn - A rhinoceros hybrid who became a successful Los Angeles businessman. He is married to Sahara. He is aggressive and almost unforgiving, but deep down a good person. Unless his wife is present, there is no other person who can reason with him. Sahara succeeds in birthing a son for Obadiah but the baby is kidnapped by Sahara's father, Serengheti. In a fit of rage, Obadiah kills Gabbatha, shocking Sahara that she is reluctant to get close to him again. Obadiah is deeply ashamed for his murder of Gabbatha and his wife's reaction and he dedicates to making amends.
- Elijah Delaney - A crocodile hybrid.
- Trench - A zebra hybrid who is a lieutenant in the Los Angeles Police Department. When he fought in a war while still under MAPPO's control, Trench lost an eye to shrapnel. His experiences and the horrors he has witnessed have caused him to see the world in black-and-white, making him appear ruthless and unfeeling in some cases he works on, and having no qualms with collateral damage. After Promethean's attempted coup using their Hyena Transgenics, Trench reconsiders his enjoyment of killing.
- Jeremiah Granger - Giraffe Hybrid. He is a tailor and a friend of Hip Flask, Ebony Hide, and even Sahara who visits him whenever she goes out anonymously. He is an educated and kind person, having extensive knowledge of tea and textiles, and among the few people Sahara confides in.
- Gabbatha - An elephant hybrid. Gabbatha is an Elephantman who served as a medic. He became a Buddhist who advocates life, acceptance, tolerance, and forgiveness, and even gained a following of like-minded humans. He was to be the officiator of Obadiah Horn and Sahara's wedding, unaware that Sahara had left her double Panya in her place. When the real Sahara arrives, revealing her and Obadiah's child, she entrusted her son to Gabbatha while she and their friends dealt with Serengheti. Panya takes the baby from Gabbatha and offers him to Serenghetti, only to be shot dead. In a fit of rage and grief, Obadiah kills Gabbatha.
- Demetrios - A mammoth hybrid. Demetrios is a transgenic but was not created by MAPPO. He was created by a Russian scientist, who was exiled for thought crimes. She stumbled upon the remains of a mammoth. She took DNA samples, implanted them with her own eggs and carried her creation in her own womb. She had to give premature birth to her child, otherwise he would have killed her had she carried him to full term. The scientist raised and loved Demetrios and taught him survival, as well as to speak many languages. When Demetrios was near fully grown, men came, desiring his mother's research. In the conflict that followed, Demetrios' mother was killed and he alone survived. Demetrios journeyed north to avoid people but was hunted relentlessly until finally he was captured by hunters and brought back to the city by cargo ship. Demetrios escaped and killed the hunters, but died from his injuries shortly afterward.
- The Mops - A group of hyena Elephantmen who were created to serve as cleanup during the war. Their job was to kill any survivors without mercy or exception. When MAPPO was brought down, the Hyenas were deemed too savage and dangerous to be rehabilitated and were all euthanized. Promethean, a remnant of MAPPO, created a new army of Hyena Elephantmen to purge the city of the older Elephantmen, only for the hyenas to be killed by Obadiah Horn and Mr. Purchase.
- The Tigers - A group of tiger transgenics created by China to serve in their military. Once the war concluded, the Tigers were all simultaneously executed, as China's already large population could not afford to let them live.

=== Humans ===
- Bianca "Vanity" Case - Hip Flask's new junior-partner. She had a crush on him but after Hip and Miki became a couple, Vanity appeared to shift her infatuation to Ebony.
- Joshua Serengheti - The main antagonist in the story. He despises the Elephantmen and wants them all killed. He is the father of Sahara and is involved with the ivory industry. Serengheti detests the Elephantmen because his job in the industry became less profitable due to the individual species of the elephantmen no longer being endangered.
- Herman Strumm - The host of Dogstar Radio. He was visited by Elijah Delaney for an interview.
- Sahara - The wife of Obadiah Horn. She acts as the voice of reason to the Elephantmen, and she is seen by all as their queen, capable of reasoning with Obadiah. Her father, Serengheti, abused her physically and emotionally for most of her childhood until she managed to get away from him. Sahara later discovered Hip Flask to be her half-brother, since he was born from her mother. She gives birth to Obadiah Horn's son, who appears entirely human and ends up getting kidnapped by Serengheti.
- Savannah - A little girl who is interested in the Elephantmen, Ebony in particular, much to the disgust and concern of her mother. She is based on Richard Starkings' child, Savannah Starkings.
- Hiromi (Miki) Kiyoko - A cab driver in Santa Monica. Totally uninhibited and possessed of a very strong sex drive, she developed a huge crush on Hip, which came to be mutual despite her mere associating with Hip causing much strife and conflict between Miki and her mother. After discovering she is pregnant, Miki gave up the baby for research. Hip accompanies her for moral support, which leads to the two falling in love.
- Janis Blackthorne - A former UN soldier and a member of the Los Angeles Police Department. She was kicked out by her parents when she was fifteen for unknown reasons. After spending some years as a drug dealer, Blackthorne became a UN soldier. During that time, she married James, who was later killed in the war against the Elephantmen. Blaming herself for his death, Blackthorne developed a hatred towards the Elephantmen. She was later killed by Yvette after preventing her from killing Granger.
- Panya - Panya is an employee of Joe, working as a dancer in the Eye of the Needle, where she was spotted by Sahara and Obadiah Horn. Noting how they looked so much alike, Sahara approaches Panya and hires her to switch places with her every now and then so that Sahara can interact with the public anonymously. Panya soon grows to like being Sahara that she even tries to take her place permanently. In the end, she is murdered by Serengheti.
- Yvette - Yvette was a soldier who fought the Elephantmen when they were MAPPO's soldiers. She earned a bloody reputation of carving her name onto the heads of every Elephantman she killed, driven by her hatred of them for killing her family and taking everything she had from her, causing her to swear to kill every last Elephantman. Yvette resurfaces years after the war in France and became a serial killer, hunting and killing all Elephantmen she could find regardless of who they were. Her killing spree comes to an end after she fails to kill Obadiah Horn. Sahara tries to talk Yvette into letting go of her hatred and emotional baggage, but Yvette, full of bitterness, hatred, and grief, cannot let it go and feeling there is no future for someone like her, she commits suicide.
- Dr. Kazushi Nikken - Dr. Nikken of the MAPPO corporation used kidnapped women as incubators to create experimental human/animal hybrids. He originally intended them to be used as "weapons of mass destruction", despite soldiers being incapable of qualifying for the term.
- La Mantia - A government agent who oversees the Elephantmen's activities. In reality, he is a part of a conspiracy called Promethean consisting of remnants of MAPPO who wish to rise in power again using the Elephantmen. La Mantia and the Promethean plan an extermination of the old Elephantmen using their recently developed Transgenic Hyena Soldiers, and personally approach Horn to offer him leadership of the army under the thumb of the Prometheans. La Mantia arrogantly lets his guard down, allowing Horn to kill him.
- Agathe - A young girl who was inspired to fight the Elephantment for idealistic reasons. After her mother and brothers are killed, Agathe takes up a dead soldier's gun and starts killing Elephantmen herself. She is found by human resistance fighters who take her in and told her of their plan to kill the Elephantmen invading their country. An Elephantman soldier finds their hideout and guns them down, missing only Agathe who managed to remain hidden. Driven by rage and grief, Agathe goes forward with her allies' plan, destroying a nuclear power plant at the cost of her life.
- Carlos Vlasco - The head of MAPPO security. He takes sadistic enjoyment in abusing the Elephantmen and was allowed to do so to produce obedient and hard soldiers. When MAPPO was brought down, Vlasco was attacked by Ebony, but survived and escaped prosecution with the aid of Joe. Vlasco receives medical treatment and prosthetic legs, but is soon diagnosed with cancer. Vlasco becomes a hitman known as the Silencer, utilizing cloaking technology to become invisible. Vlasco kills Elephantmen and harvests their cells to produce treatments for his cancer.

== Collected editions ==
- Elephantmen, vol. 0: Armed Forces- Collects Elephantmen: War Toys #1-3 Elephantmen: Yvette, Elephantmen #34-35. Softcover: ISBN 978-1-60706-514-2 Hardcover: ISBN 978-1-60706-468-8
- Elephantmen, vol. 1: Wounded Animals - Collects Elephantmen #1-7. Softcover: ISBN 1-58240-934-X Hardcover: ISBN 1-58240-691-X
- Elephantmen, vol. 2: Fatal Diseases - Collects Elephantmen #8-15 & The Pilot. Softcover: ISBN 1-60706-177-5 Hardcover: ISBN 1-58240-915-3
- Elephantmen: Damaged Goods - Collects Elephantmen #18-20. Softcover: ISBN 978-1-60706-137-3
- Elephantmen, vol. 3: Dangerous Liaisons - Collects Elephantmen #16-23. Softcover: ISBN 1-60706-268-2 Hardcover: ISBN 1-60706-250-X
- Elephantmen, vol. 4: Questionable Things - Collects Elephantmen #24-30. Softcover: ISBN 978-1-60706-393-3 Hardcover: ISBN 978-1-60706-364-3
- Elephantmen, vol. 5: Devilish Functions - Collects Elephantmen #31-33 and 36-39. Softcover: ISBN 978-1-60706-614-9 Hardcover: ISBN 978-1-60706-576-0
- Elephantmen, vol. 6: Earthly Desires - Collects Elephantmen #40-49. Softcover: ISBN 978-1-60706-786-3 Hardcover: ISBN 978-1-60706-752-8
- Elephantmen, Mammoth Vol. 1 - Collects Elephantmen: War Toys #1-3 Elephantmen: Yvette, Elephantmen #1-11, #34-35, #57. Softcover: ISBN 978-1-63215-004-2
- Elephantmen, Mammoth Vol. 2 - Collects Elephantmen #12-30. Softcover: ISBN 978-1-63215-881-9
- Elephantmen, Mammoth Vol. 3 - Collects Elephantmen #31-50. Softcover: ISBN 978-1-5343-0825-1
- Elephantmen: 2260 vol. 1: Memories of the Future - Collects Elephantmen #51-55. Softcover: ISBN 978-1-60706-959-1
- Elephantmen: 2260 vol. 2: The Red Queen - Collects Elephantmen #58-62. Softcover: ISBN 978-1-63215-251-0
- Elephantmen: 2260 vol. 3: Learning to be Human - Collects Elephantmen #50, 56, 57, 63 & 64. Softcover: ISBN 978-1-63215-533-7
- Elephantmen: 2260 vol. 4: All Coming Evil - Collects Elephantmen #65-69. Softcover: ISBN 978-1-63215-805-5
- Elephantmen: 2260 vol. 5: Up Close and Personal - Collects Elephantmen #70-71, 73-76. Softcover: ISBN 978-1-63215-880-2
- Elephantmen: 2260 vol. 6: The Least, The Lost & The Last - Collects Elephantmen #72, 77-80. Softcover: ISBN 978-1-5343-0188-7
- Elephantmen 2261 Season 1: The Death of Shorty. Softcover: ISBN 978-0-9766761-7-1
- Elephantmen 2261 Season 2: The Pentalion Job!. Softcover.
- Elephantmen 2261 Volume 1 - Collects Elephantmen 2261 Seasons 1-2. Softcover: ISBN 978-1-5067-3540-5
- Elephantmen 2261 Season 3: Theo Laroux Meets The Elephantmen!.
- Elephantmen 2261 Season 4: Under Each Skin.

== Film adaptation ==
At WonderCon in 2010 Comicraft/Active Images said the option of their Image Comics series Elephantmen was bought by Zucker Productions for development into a film. Starkings himself was working on the draft treatment: "Jerry [Zucker] and I can't wait to bring the stories of Hip, Horn and Sahara to life on screen in a way that will simply take your breath away". The project's status is unknown.
