= Freedom Force vs the 3rd Reich =

2005 video game

- Developer: Irrational Games
- Publishers: Irrational Games (Note: 2K Games published the game on Steam.); Digital Jesters (Europe)
- Producer: Jonathan Chey
- Designers: Dorian Hart; Alexx Kay
- Programmer: Allan Richards
- Artists: Ben Lee; Lorne Brooks
- Writer: Ken Levine
- Engine: Gamebryo
- Platform: Microsoft Windows
- Release: NA: March 8, 2005; EU: April 14, 2005
- Genres: Real-time tactics, tactical role-playing
- Modes: Single-player, multiplayer

Freedom Force vs the 3rd Reich is a real-time tactical role-playing game developed and published by Irrational Games. The sequel to Freedom Force, the player guides a team of superheroes as they travel back in time, and help overthrow Nazi Germany and its allies during World War II. In the game, players take control of a team of up to four characters and battle their way through completely destructible 3D maps in a series of missions based on classic superhero comics.

== Plot ==
Supervillain Nuclear Winter steals Time Master's inert body and uses it to steal nuclear missiles from the Cuban Missile Crisis in an effort to start a nuclear war between the United States and the USSR. The Freedom Force foils his plot, but on the return trip, the timeline changes and Freedom Force finds that the Axis powers achieved victory in World War II. Using the disturbance in the timeline to guide them, Mentor projects the heroes back in the time-stream to battle the villainous Blitzkrieg, who created the disturbance. These superheroes meet and team up with the heroes of that age. In the course of Blitzkrieg's defeat, Alchemiss gains powers from Time Master's body and frees Man-Bot from the Celestial Clock, but goes insane over the sudden expansion of her powers and becomes Entropy, who threatens time and space. Entropy is eventually defeated by Freedom Force with the help of the awakened Time Master. Briefly asserting her original personality, Alchemiss prevents herself from ever existing so she cannot become Entropy, but suddenly finds herself face to face with Energy X.

== Reception ==
Reception

Aggregate score
Aggregator	Score
Metacritic	86/100

Review scores
Publication	Score
Computer Gaming World	5/5
Edge	7/10
Game Informer	8.25/10
GameSpot	8.7/10
GameSpy	4.5/5
GameZone	8.5/10
IGN	9/10
PC Format	90%
PC Gamer (US)	81%
VideoGamer.com	8/10

The game received "generally favorable reviews", albeit slightly less than the original Freedom Force's "universal acclaim", according to the review aggregation website Metacritic.

Freedom Force vs the 3rd Reich was a runner-up for Computer Games Magazine's list of the top 10 computer games of 2005.

== Legacy and modifications (mods) ==
Freedom Force vs the Third Reich followed its predecessor title, Freedom Force, by providing a game engine that could play campaigns (adventures consisting of multiple missions) other than the one released with the game. The developers released a suite of mod tools to allow fans to design their own campaigns and add their own art assets for use in the game. This approach, using a format that was highly modifiable and open to third-party editing, has attracted a strong online community of modding enthusiasts, centered around a discussion board called Freedom Reborn, where modders have taken to creating their own content for the game. Subject matter for fan-created game mods ranges from new original characters and stories to characters from other franchises.

The game's modding community has created a wide variety of content, including new art assets like textures (skins), 3D models (meshes), visual effects (FX) and maps. Contributors have also created voice packs, new Rumble Room (a combat sandbox) missions and campaigns.
