= Popbot =

Popbot is the name of an award-winning prestige format comic book written and illustrated by Australian Ashley Wood.

In 2004 IDW, in association with Sideshow Toys, produced the limited edition Popbot polystone statue designed by Ashley Wood.

== Movie ==
In September 2006, Ashley Wood announced in his blog that a Popbot movie had been announced. Resolution Independent have acquired the rights to make a Popbot movie, Wood's company, 7174 will be providing the art direction, with Wood having a close involvement.

== Awards ==
- Communication Arts 2002 Award of Excellence for Illustration
- 2 Spectrum Gold Awards for "Excellence in Advertising" and "Comics", in 2002 ("Comics" award was for the comic "Luwona angry", which is also from Popbot)
