= Shadow Hunter (comics) =

Jenna Jameson's Shadow Hunter #1 Art by Greg Horn

Shadow Hunter is a three issue comic book limited series by Virgin Comics and porn star, entertainer and author Jenna Jameson. It is part of Virgin Comics' Voices line, which allows celebrities to create their own comic books. The story was conceptualized by Jenna Jameson and Witchblade writer Christina Z, who wrote the script. Mukesh Singh illustrated the book.

== Story ==
A young, orphaned, beautiful woman, Jezzerie Jaden, attempts to make a life for herself in the big city. As she grapples with mundane problems like making rent and a creepy manager at work, something deeper brews: a nagging suspicion that her life is not her own. Seeking answers (not to mention extra cash) she enrolls in a past life regression experiment which seems to ignite visions of a demonic past that no one can explain.

== Publications ==
- Issue #0 was released on January 2, 2008
- Issue #1 was released on February 20, 2008
- Issue #2 was released on April 9, 2008
- Issue #3 was released on May 28, 2008
