= Mojados: Through the Night =

- DVD cover
- Directed by: Tommy Davis
- Starring: N/A
- Cinematography: Tommy Davis
- Edited by: Tommy Davis
- Music by: Sin Panache
- Production company: Tdrand
- Release date: March 15, 2004 (SXSW Film Festival)
- Running time: 79 minutes
- Countries: Mexico, United States
- Languages: Spanish, English

Mojados: Through the Night is a 2004 documentary film directed by Tommy Davis. The film documents the journey of four men as they trek 120 miles across the Texas desert.

== Summary ==
Filmed over the course of ten days the film follows four men into the world of illegal immigration. Alongside Bear, Tiger, Handsome, and Old Man, director Davis takes a 120-mile cross-desert journey that has been traveled innumerable times by nameless immigrants like these four migrants from Michoacán, Mexico. Davis tells the stories of these migrants as their dehydrated days evading the U.S. Border Patrol turn into sub-zero nights filled with barbed wire, storms and ever-present confrontation with death.

== Cast ==
- Guapo – Handsome
- Oso – Bear
- Tigre – Tiger
- Viejo – Old Man
- Tommy Davis – Narrator

== Background ==
Davis said growing up he lived on the border, and after attending college in Washington D.C., he discovered that people didn't appreciate these migrant workers. So he decided to make the documentary because he "wanted to know more about them", and he had an "appreciation for people who are willing to do this." Before he set out on the journey with the men, Davis filmed interviews with some Texas ranchers and border-patrol agents. According to Davis, he said "most were sympathetic to the migrants' plight." Davis also recalled that he knew he risked getting arrested, but he also knew he had it easier, because he "could have wandered up to the road and wave down a passing car at any time."

== Reception ==
Ben Kenigsberg of The Village Voice wrote the film is "a lean, effective slice of agitprop enlivened with a New Wave voice-over and an unusual emotional directness ... Davis strives to keep himself out of the film, favoring a harrowing yet compassionate you-are-there aesthetic that underscores the hardship of the migrant workers' struggles." American film critic Dana Stevens said the film "manages to capture firsthand the danger, fatigue and sheer tedium of an arduous illegal border crossing from Mexico without ever becoming tedious itself."

Angelique Flores wrote in Home Media Magazine, that the documentary "feels more like a feature film, as the gravity of the situation grows more intense and audiences wonder whether the guys make it to Austin ... it's grittiness and simplicity magnified the moving journey." Elizabeth Weitzman of the New York Daily News said the film is "modest but memorable", and the director "uses a breathless narration to cover significant gaps in the story and is a distracting presence, but his inexperience is balanced by a desire to give voice to the anonymous victims of the American Dream."

== Awards ==
Festival	Category	Result	Ref
SXSW Film Festival	Audience Award	Won	
Arizona International Film Festival	Best Documentary	Won	
Santa Fe Film Festival	Best Documentary	Won	
San Antonio Film Festival	Grand Prize	Won	
Kansas International Film Festival	Audience Award	Won	
