= Freedom Force (2002 video game) =

- Developers: Irrational Games (Windows); The Omni Group (Mac OS X)
- Publishers: Crave Entertainment and Electronic Arts (Windows); MacPlay (Mac OS X); 2K Games (Steam)
- Engine: NetImmerse
- Platforms: Microsoft Windows, Mac OS X
- Release: March 26, 2002: Windows; NA: March 26, 2002; EU: July 12, 2002 Mac OS X; WW: December 21, 2002
- Genre: Real-time tactical role-playing
- Modes: Single-player, multiplayer

Freedom Force is a real-time tactical role-playing game developed by Irrational Games and published by Electronic Arts and Crave Entertainment in 2002. The player guides a team of superheroes as they defend Patriot City from a variety of villains, monsters, and other menaces. The game's budget was around $2 million. A sequel, Freedom Force vs The 3rd Reich, was self-published in early March 2005. The games were made available on Steam on May 29, 2009.

== Story ==
Set in Patriot City, a generic American city, circa the late 50s/early 60s, the game sees a range of ordinary citizens imbued with super-powers after being struck by beams of Energy X. First among these is Frank Stiles, an elderly veteran of the Manhattan Project, who becomes Minute Man. He is quickly joined by Mentor, a member of the alien species, the Domain, who are responsible for the Energy X striking Earth. Together with El Diablo and Manbot, they create Freedom Force, which rapidly expands to include other heroes while taking on a variety of Energy X powered villains. Stories are broken down into issues, with each issue containing multiple individual missions.

The game is a homage to the Silver Age of comics, with most of the cast being analogues to one or two Marvel or DC characters.

== Gameplay ==
The player controls a group of up to four members of Freedom Force, guiding them in real time to complete objectives, mostly combat based. Each character's actions are limited by individual stamina meters, with different actions requiring varying amounts of stamina, relative to their power. Characters level up with XP gained from participating in missions which then gives CP. This is used to improve existing abilities or add new ones.

The game offers the ability to create custom characters, especially through the use of mods. These can be recruited in the main story, as well as used in multiplayer. Characters, including customs, are given a rating in Prestige based on the amount of and strength of their abilities, preventing players from recruiting overpowered custom characters at the start of the story campaign and allowing for multiplayer balance.

== Development ==
The game used the NetImmerse game engine.

== Comic book tie-in ==
Cover of the first issue

From January to June 2005, the story of the first Freedom Force game was retold in a six-issue comic book miniseries published by Image Comics. This series was scripted by Eric Dieter and featured Jack Kirby influenced artwork by Tom Scioli. Dieter also wrote the series "Bible" and served as community manager for the official website's forum, "Freedom Fans".

== Reception ==
Reception

Aggregate score
Aggregator	Score
Metacritic	90/100

Review scores
Publication	Score
AllGame	4.5/5
Computer Gaming World	5/5
Edge	7/10
Eurogamer	9/10
Game Informer	8.75/10
GamePro	4.5/5
GameSpot	9/10
GameSpy	4.5/5
GameZone	8.9/10
IGN	9.3/10
PC Gamer (US)	94%
Entertainment Weekly	A
Maxim	6/10

The game received "universal acclaim" according to the review aggregation website Metacritic. GameSpot named it the best computer game of March 2002.

Freedom Force won Computer Gaming World's 2002 "Strategy Game of the Year" award. The editors of Computer Games Magazine named it the ninth-best computer game of 2002 and called it "the superhero game fans have been waiting for". It also received the magazine's "Best Voice Acting" award. GameSpot presented it with its annual "Best Story on PC" prize. Freedom Force was also nominated for PC Gamer US's "2002 Best Roleplaying Game", The Electric Playground's 2002 "Best Strategy Game for PC" and GameSpot's "Best Music on PC", "Biggest Surprise on PC" and "Best Graphics (Artistic) on PC" awards. During the 6th Annual Interactive Achievement Awards, Freedom Force was nominated for "Computer Role-Playing Game of the Year" by the Academy of Interactive Arts & Sciences.

== Sequel ==
Freedom Force was followed by a sequel, Freedom Force vs. the Third Reich, which was released three years after the original game.
