= Automatic Kafka =

Comic book series

Publication information
- Publisher: Wildstorm
- Schedule: Monthly
- Format: Limited series
- Publication date: September 2002 - July 2003
- No. of issues: 9
- Main character: Automatic Kafka

Creative team
- Written by: Joe Casey
- Artist: Ashley Wood

Automatic Kafka is a nine-issue comic book limited series written by Joe Casey with art by Ashley Wood. It was published in 2002 by DC Comics' Wildstorm imprint.

The series followed the life of Automatic Kafka, an android who had been a member of a mass-marketed superhero group called the $tranger$ during the 1980s. After the team breaks up, Kafka is lost, looking for a new direction in life. The comic follows Kafka as he tries different ways of becoming human: drugs, sex and fame among them. The series also visits Kafka's former teammates who each have adapted to their life post-$tranger$ in their own way.

== Plot ==
The series begins with Automatic Kafka's first nanotecheroin trip. As Kafka ponders where his life has gone since the $tranger$ disbanded, The Warning is approached by the National Park Service who want to use Automatic Kafka for clandestine missions. Kafka avoids being trapped into service with the NPS by doing celebrity product endorsements and later hosting a lethal gameshow called The Million Dollar Detail.

After an issue focusing on a side character, the series moves to The Constitution of the United States, who leads a group of mercenaries in an attack on a jungle camp. As he finishes, a mysterious flight of military planes bombs the camp with exploding babies. He then returns to the United States, where he embarks on a career as a porn star.

Meanwhile, Kafka and Helen of Troy are enjoying a tryst when The Warning summons them to a social call with an old arch-enemy, Galaxia. Helen and Kafka both balk at the reunion, but eventually warm to the experience. Shortly thereafter, The Warning tricks Galaxia and kills him to power a machine that manufactures the mysterious exploding babies.

As Kafka wrestles with the suicide note left by his drug-dealer/assistant, a phantom butterfly arrives to "rescue" him "from the possible tedium of another so-called 'story arc'." The butterfly takes him to a comic shop, where he meets Joe Casey and Ashley Wood. The authors explain to Kafka that "You've been operating under different rules than most superheroes. You're part of an ongoing marketing experiment. Kids aren't flocking to superheroes like they used to, so now we've got superheroes for adults." Because they do not want to share their creation with other writers and artists, Casey and Wood erase Kafka as the last issue ends.

== Characters ==
- Automatic Kafka: "Morphing Mecha-Soldier", a nanotecheroin-addicted android capable of morphing his body into nearly any shape, usually guns. Formerly a member of the $tranger$, AK becomes a public celebrity to avoid, in part, having to work for the clandestine arm of the National Park Service.
- The Warning: A wealthy government contractor who founded the $tranger$. He has nefarious connections to the National Park Service and is working on a secret project involving exploding babies (the baby plot was not resolved before the comic ended).
- The Constitution of the United States: "Patriotic Combat Legend," an ultra-violent, hyper-sexual patriotic warrior with red, white, and blue tattoos and a gas mask. The Constitution appears to work for a covert branch of the U.S. military.
- Helen of Troy: "Feminine Powers of Mystery", an extremely sexualized woman whose erotic charms are her superpower. Casey and Wood imply, in issue 9, that her powers are magical.
- Saint Nick: "Brooding Anti-Hero." The one member of the $tranger$ who was not featured in any issues of the comic. Mentioned briefly only in issues 2 and 9.
