= Santa Fe Film Festival =

- Location: Santa Fe, New Mexico, United States
- Most recent: 2025
- Language: English
- Website: santafefilmfestival.com/index/

The Santa Fe Film Festival is a non-profit organization which presents important world cinema that represents aesthetic, critical, and entertainment standards highlighting New Mexican film. The organization partners with educational groups, schools, and other non-profits to provide a forum for filmmakers, critics, educators, and historians. The award is in the form of a mounted original sculpture. The festival has been listed as one of the top independent film festivals in the United States.

== Festival and awards ==
The festival is generally run between Thanksgiving and Christmas time (late November to early December) in the Santa Fe, New Mexico area and was inaugurated in 1999 but began an institutionalized schedule starting in the year 2000 which sold over 9,000 tickets and passes. The festival was founded by Kurt Young and Joanna England The awards varied over the years. Initial categories included: Best Short, Best Documentary, Best Feature, Best Native American Film, and Best Latino Film. By 2006, the awards became the Milagro Award (best American independent film), the Independent Spirit Award (Santa Fe Natural Tobacco Independent Spirit Award), and the Audience Award, Honorable Mention (if needed), Creative Spirit Award, and the Lifetime Achievement Award (if warranted). The major contributors to the event, Robert O'Connor, Ben Mason, Jon Bowman and John Armijo, serve as the board of directors, along with Linda Horn. Kurt Young was the first director of the festival and appointed Jon Bowman. Jon Bowman was the director of the festival for ten years.

Individuals awarded include:

=== 1999 ===
- Best Feature- Cider House Rules

=== 2000 ===
- Best Short - This Guy Is Falling (2000) - Michael Horowitz (I); Gareth Smith (I)
- Best Documentary - One Day in the Life of Andrei Arsenevich - Chris Marker
- Best Feature - Zamani barayé masti asbha (2000) - Bahman Ghobadi
- Best Native American Film - Backroads (2000) - Shirley Cheechoo
- Best Latino Film - Estorvo (2000) - Ruy Guerra

=== 2001 ===
- Best Short - Dragonflies, the Baby Cries (2000) - Jane Gillooly and Gina, an Actress, Age 29 (2001) - Paul Harrill
- Best Documentary - Paperboys (2001) - Mike Mills (II)
- Best Native American-Themed Film - Christmas in the Clouds (2001) - Kate Montgomery (I)
- Best Feature - Atanarjuat: The Fast Runner (2001) - Zacharias Kunuk
- Best Latino Film - Y tu mamá también (2001) - Alfonso Cuarón

=== 2002 ===
- Best Short - Book of Kings (2002) - Chris Terrio
- Best Documentary - Vakvagany (2002) - Benjamin Meade
- Best Native American-Themed Film - Lady Warriors (2002) - John C.P. Goheen
- Best Feature - Hukkle (2002) - György Pálfi (I)
- Best Latino Film - Todas las azafatas van al cielo (2002) - Daniel Burman
- Best New Mexico Film - Little Lourdes (2002) - Elisabeth Unna
- Milagro Award - Slaughter Rule, The (2002) - Alex Smith (II); Andrew J. Smith
- Audience Award - Ruthie and Connie: Every Room in the House (2002) - Deborah Dickson

=== 2003 ===
- Creative Spirit Award - Jon E. Edwards Is In Love (2003) - Chris Bradley, Kyle LaBrache
- Honorable Mention - Blackwater Elegy (2003) - Joe O'Brien (III); Matthew Porter (I)
- Audience Award - Indigo (2003) - Stephen Simon
- Best of the Southwest - Jesus Freak (2003) - Morgan Nichols and Movie Farm
- Best Short - Simones Labyrinth (2003) - Iván Sáinz-Pardo
- Best Short Film - Raven Tales: Raven Steals the Sun (2004) (TV) - Chris Kientz
- Best Documentary - Mojados: Through the Night (2004) - Tommy Davis (V)
- Best of Festival - Dare mo shiranai (2004) - Hirokazu Koreeda
- Creative Spirit Award - Loss of Nameless Things, The (2004) - Bill Rose (I)
- Best of the Fest - Depuis qu'Otar est parti... (2003) - Julie Bertucelli
- Independent Spirit Award - Sonata (2004) (V) - Boris Undorf
- Best Latino Film- Paloma de papel (2003) - Fabrizio Aguilar

=== 2004 ===
- Milagro Award: Best Documentary- Mojados: Through the Night (2004) -Tommy Davis
- Milagro Award: Raven Tales (2004)- Chris Kientz
- Milagro Award: Best of Festival- Nobody Knows (Dare mo shiranai (original title) (2004)- Hirokazu Koreeda
- Milagro Award: Creative Spirit Award- The Loss of Nameless Things (2004)- Bill Rose
- Independent Spirit Award: Sonata (2004) -Boris Undorf

=== 2005 ===
- Screenwriting - Fall to Grace (2005) - Mari Marchbanks
- Best of the Southwest - Self Medicated (2005) - Monty Lapica (director); Tommy Bell (II) (producer)
- Best Animation - Souvenir (2004) - Stephen Rose (III)
- Creative Spirit Award in Documentary - Balloonhat (2005) - A.G. Vermouth

=== 2006 ===
- Milagro Award - Cowboy del Amor (2005) - Michèle Ohayon and English as a Second Language (2005)
- Independent Spirit Award - Jam (2006/I) - Craig Serling; Nicole Lonner
- Audience Award - Gymnast, The (2006) - Ned Farr
- Lifetime Achievement award for Hungarian cinematographer Laszlo Kovacs Kovacs has more than 60 feature films to his credit, including the 1969 biker film Easy Rider, Five Easy Pieces, Paper Moon and Ghostbusters. Actress Ali MacGraw hosted the ceremony.

=== 2007 ===
- Luminaria Lifetime Achievement award for National Film Board of Canada First Nations filmmaker Alanis Obomsawin.
- Best documentary - The Ballad of Esequiel Hernandez

=== 2008 ===
- Milagro Award- Best Cinematography- The Objective (2008)- Stephanie Martin
- Independent Spirit Award- Shoot First and Pray You Live (Because Luck Has Nothing to Do with It) (2008)- Lance Doty
- Creative Spirit Award- An Unlikely Weapon (2008) - Susan Morgan Cooper
- Emerging Filmmaker Award- Em (2008)- Tony Barbieri
- Heineken Red Star Award- A Lonely Place for Dying (2008)- Justin Eugene Evans
- Audience Award- Play the Game- Marc Fienberg
- Indiefests @ SFFF Audience Award- Best Short (2008) - Hell on the Border
- Indiefests @ SFFF Audience Award- Best Documentary- Six Man, Texas (2008) - Alan Barber
- Jury Award- Best Short Film- El taxista (2008)- Luis Robledo

=== 2009 ===
- Milagro Award: Best documentary- Mythic Journeys- Steven Boe, Whitney Boe
- Milagro Award: Best Indigenous Film - Kissed by Lightning (2009)- Kateri Walker
- Milagro Award: Best Short Doc - Sonabai: Another Way of Seeing (2009)- David Berez
- Milagro Award: Emerging Filmmaker- Char·ac·ter (2009)- Drago Sumonja
- Creative Spirit Award: Earthwork (2009) -Chris Ordal
- Emerging Filmmaker Award: Drago Sumonja
- Audience Award: Earthwork (2009) -Chris Ordal
- Jury Award: Best Dramatic Feature- The Only Good Indian (2009)- Kevin Willmott, Thomas L. Carmody, J.T. O'Neal, Scott Richardson, Greg Hurd, Matt Jacobson, Jeremy Osbern, Dan Wildcat, Wes Studi, Matt Cullen
- Jury Award: Best Documentary Feature- Vivir de pie. Las guerras de Cipriano Mera - Valentí Figueres, Helena Sánchez
- Jury Award: Best Short Film: La niña del desierto- Malachi Rempen
- Festival Prize: Best New Mexico Filmmaker- Becoming Eduardo -Michael Colin (Editor) (Postproduction Supervisor)
- Festival Prize: Best Picture- Taylor's Way - René Brar

=== 2021 ===
- Jury Award: Best Animated Film - Metro6 -Geoff Hecht
- Jury Award: Best Director - Ruben Pla (The Horror Crowd- 2020)
- Jury Award: Best Cinematography -Recipiphany - Piero Basso
- Jury Award: Best Film- Motorvation- Angus Benfield (writer)
- Jury Award: Best International Film- Campeón - Oscar Rodríguez Górriz
- Jury Award: Best Story- Black Heart, Red Hands- Russell Southam (producer), Adam Spinks (producer), Owen Elliott (consulting producer)
- Sisters of Cinema: Best Short Film- The Woman Under The Tree
- Sisters of Cinema: Producer- Hung Up - Melissa Jackson
- Best Short Film: LGBTQ+ - 62-84, I Didn't Copy That, HQ - 62-84 Anlasilmadi Merkez (original title)
- Best of Afro Cinema- Black & White - Edgar Garcia Chavez (director)
- Best of Afro Cinema- White Gold- Luke Bradford, Jackie Sheppard, Luke Walton
- Best Film- The Kennedy Incident- Mart Sander
- Best Story- Terror Eyes- Delaney Bishop, Felix Brenner
- Best Feature Film- Broken Gaiete- Hafid Abdelmoula
- Best LGBTQ+ Film- Jesse James- Josef Steiff (writer/director)
