= Comicraft =

Graphic design company

- Type: Lettering and logo design
- Industry: Comics
- Founded: 1992
- Founder: Richard Starkings
- Headquarters: Los Angeles, California
- Key people: Richard Starkings, John Roshell
- Website: http://www.comicraft.com

Comicraft is a company which provides graphic design and lettering services to various (primarily comic book) companies.

== History ==
The company was founded by Richard Starkings in 1992. Starkings had been working for Marvel UK for five years, but left London for New York, circa 1990. Lettering large numbers of pages overnight for Marvel editor Gregory Wright, Starkings decided to move away from the New York Marvel offices to California, partly hoping that the increased distance would mean increased deadlines. A year later, Starkings (now based in Los Angeles) was asked to letter issues of Marvel's premier title Uncanny X-Men.

Unable to meet the deadlines of then-editor Bob Harras, he considered faster methods of lettering, and turned to computers. Digitizing his lettering in readiness, and joining with designer John Roshell, Starkings unwittingly found that the formation of Image Comics created a perfect opportunity for his innovative lettering practices. The 'superstar artist' status of the Image founders, and the money they were able spend on production allowed Image to attract letterers from DC and Marvel, creating a vacuum made all the more stark by the concurrent comics boom inspiring companies to increase output. Although meeting resistance in some quarters (most famously from Harras at Marvel), the higher-paychecks offered by Image allowed some letterers to produce less work, further snow-balling the demand for Starkings' services.

For a name Starkings recalled a friend's carpentry business being called "Proudcraft", and the two settled on Comicraft. Overcoming the reluctance of the comics industry with such titles as Ghost Rider 2099, Astro City and Generation X, although unable to challenge the legendary Todd Klein for the "Lettering" title, Starkings and Comicraft nevertheless managed to win an Eisner Award in 1994, for "Best Publication Design" for Busiek and Ross' Marvels. The Comics Buyer's Guide and Wizard: The Comics Magazine also went against the Eisners, and named Comicraft the best letterer for 3 and 7 years in a row respectively.

=== Active Images ===
A sub-company, "Active Images" was initiated in 1995 as an online arm initially to "make Comicraft's library of comic book fonts commercially available", but in 2002 its role was expanded into the world of publishing. Active Images publishes, among other titles, Richard Starkings' own comics Hip Flask and Elephantmen.

== Clients ==
Comicraft's work and fonts have appeared in hundreds of products produced and distributed by all four of the major American comics companies: DC Comics, Marvel Comics, Dark Horse Comics and Image Comics; as well as for magazines and books produced by Active Images, Mad Magazine, Nickelodeon Magazine, Scholastic and Titan Books.

Many of the company's fonts, created by Starkings and designer Roshell are commercially available to individuals and institutions as software applications through the Active Images publishing company via their website, ComicBookFonts.com.

== Bibliography (selected) ==
Comicraft has produced a 64-page book detailing the basics of lettering comics:

- Comic Book Lettering: The Comicraft Way ISBN 978-0-9740567-3-9

Comics and books either lettered by, or featuring fonts created by, Starkings/Comicraft include:

- Batman: The Killing Joke (DC) (By Alan Moore and Brian Bolland) — hand-lettered by Starkings pre-Comicraft, when he was still in England.
- Spider-Man Blue (Marvel) (By Jeph Loeb and Tim Sale)
- Marvels (Marvel) (By Kurt Busiek and Alex Ross)
- Astro City (WildStorm) (By Kurt Busiek, Brent Anderson and Alex Ross)
- Battle Chasers (WildStorm/Image) (By Joe Madureira)
- Danger Girl (WildStorm) (By J. Scott Campbell)
- Batman: Hush (DC) (By Jeph Loeb and Jim Lee)
- Superman For All Seasons (DC) (By Jeph Loeb and Tim Sale)

Almost every book published by MonkeyBrain features cover fonts licensed from Comicraft. These include:

- Jess Nevins' Annotations on Alan Moore and Kevin O'Neill's The League of Extraordinary Gentlemen; "Heroes & Monsters" and "A Blazing World"
