= Tom Scioli =

American comic artist

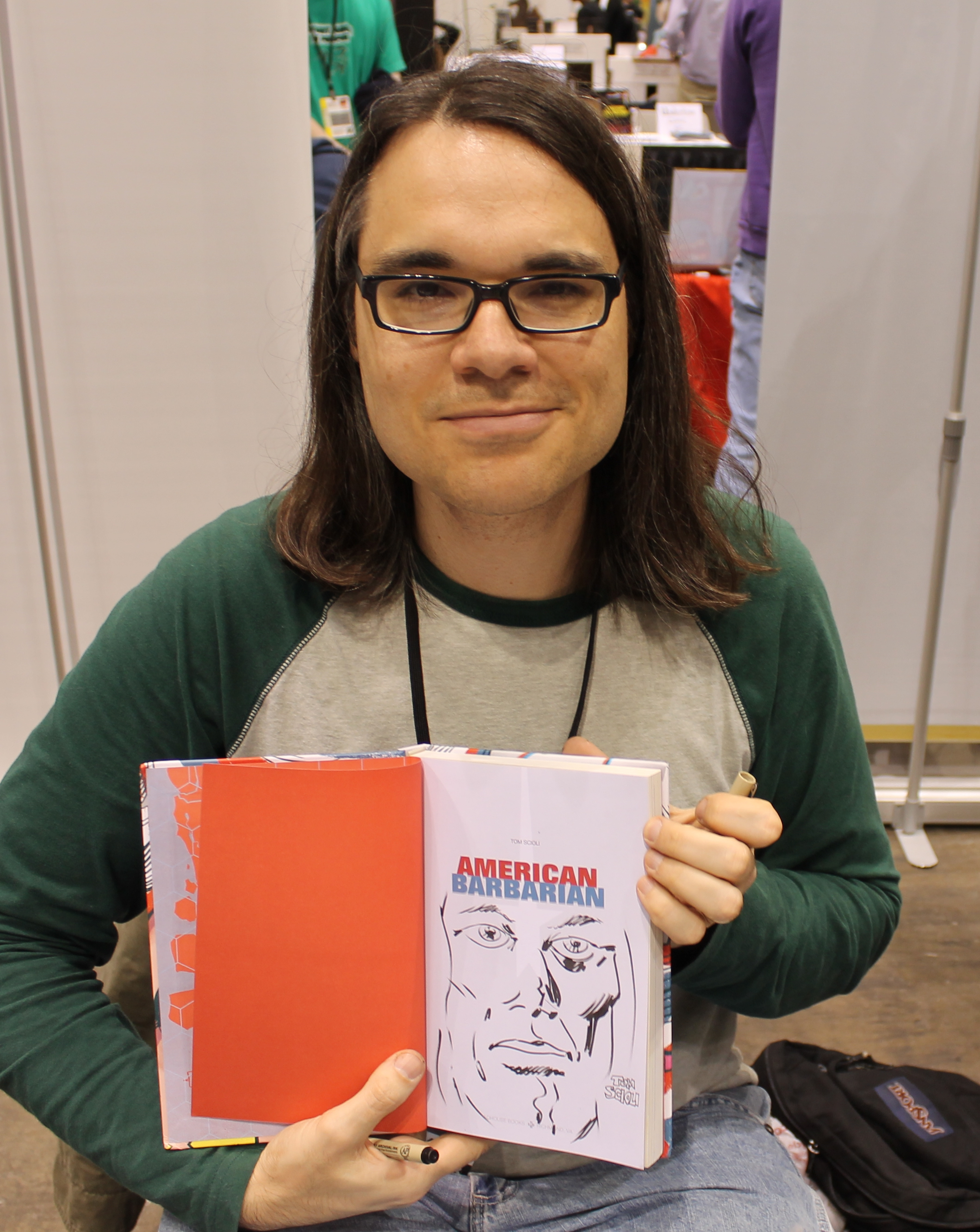
- Scioli in 2012
- Born: Thomas Scioli c. 1977
- Areas: Writer, Penciller, Inker
- Notable works: Gødland

Thomas Scioli is an American comic book artist and writer best known for working in a style similar to Jack Kirby.

== Biography ==
A discussion with Scioli in 2023

Scioli was born in Philadelphia and moved to Pittsburgh after studying at the University of Pittsburgh in the 1990s.

Scioli's epic sci-fi/fantasy series The Myth of 8-Opus won a 1999 Xeric Grant and attracted mild industry attention, earning him a small part illustrating the Fantastic Four: World's Greatest Comic Magazine miniseries (2001) and ultimately higher-profile projects at Image Comics: the miniseries Freedom Force (2005) and the super-sci-fi-opera epic Gødland (with writer Joe Casey). Scioli has stated that Gødland is "the best thing out there right now" and that he can imagine staying with the book for the rest of his career.

Scioli has attracted some criticism for the similarity between his art and Jack Kirby's, but he is comfortable with his style:

I'm working in the Kirby tradition ... No one else's art does for me what Kirby's does. Everything else looks limp and flat by comparison. He found a new way of doing things. I want to follow his lead. I think he found a way of drawing that is the optimal way of drawing for sci-fi comic book epic storytelling. ... It doesn't need to be correct or accurate, just cool-looking.

In 2013, Scioli announced he was leaving comics, but in 2018, he produced Go Bots for IDW.

Scioli was raised in Philadelphia and resides in Pittsburgh, Pennsylvania.

Scioli hosts a pop-culture centric YouTube channel called The Total Recall Show alongside his friend/musician, Matt Zeoli.

== Bibliography ==
Comics work includes:

- The Myth of 8-Opus (Creator, A-Okay Comics)
- Fantastic Four: World's Greatest Comic Magazine #3 (Contributor, Marvel Comics, August 2001)
- Freedom Force #1-6 (with Eric Dieter, Image Comics, January–June 2005)
- Gødland #1-37 (with writer Joe Casey, Image Comics, July 2005 – July 2012)
- Elephantmen #3 (artist, Image Comics, September 2006)
- "Space Smith" (script and art, in Next Issue Project #1, Image Comics, February 2008)
- "Teddy and the Yeti" (cover art, Wagon Wheel Comics, April 2010)
- Transformers vs G.I. Joe #1-13, #0 (artist and co-writer with John Barber, IDW Comics, May 2014-March 2017)
- American Barbarian (writer and artist, IDW Comics, August 2015)
- Gobots #1-5 (writer and artist, IDW Comics, November 21, 2018 – March 17, 2019)
- Fantastic Four: Grand Design #1-2 (writer and artist, Marvel Comics, December 2019)
- Jack Kirby: The Epic Life of the King of Comics (writer and artist, Ten Speed Press, July 2020)
- I Am Stan: A Graphic Biography of the Legendary Stan Lee (writer and artist, Ten Speed Press, Sept, 2023)
- Jack Kirby's Star Warriors Starring Adam Starr and the Solar Legion one-shot (Image Comics, September 2023)
- Godzilla's Monsterpiece Theatre #1-3 (writer and artist, IDW Publishing, October 2024)
- Space Opera Xanadax: Across the Unknown Dimensions of the Galaxy GN (writer and artist, Image Comics, August 2025)

== Awards ==
- 2008: Nominated for "Best Graphic Album—Reprint" Eisner Award, for Gødland Celestial Edition Book One
