= Exit (British magazine) =

British art magazine

- One of the cover of issue 48, art by Edward Burtynsky
- Editor-in-Chief: Stephen Toner
- Frequency: Bi-annual
- Founded: 2000
- Country: United Kingdom
- Language: English
- Website: Exit website

Exit is a magazine that was co-founded in 2000 by editor/photographer Stephen Toner and art director Mark Jubber.

The premier issue of Exit, featuring more than 100 pages of art, fashion and landscape photography, went on to receive industry acclaim.

We publish work that not only represents the true face of photography but also demonstrates how photographers want to be perceived in an industry that rarely affords them the opportunity. (Stephen Toner)

== Contributors ==
Photographers who have produced work for Exit include Inez van Lamsweerde and Vinoodh Matadin, Juergen Teller, Terry Richardson, Richard Prince, Klaus Thymann, Philip-Lorca diCorcia, Gregory Crewdson, Paul Graham, Martin Parr, Stephen Shore, William Eggleston and Wim Wenders.

== Achievements ==
At the 2002 Magazine Design Awards, Exit won two awards for Consumer Front Cover of the Year, described by the judges as "bold, minimalist and striking" and Best Use of Photography. Exit went on to win the award for Best Use of Photography again in 2003.

In 2000, Creative Review awarded their Creative Future for Editorial Design to Exit’s art director Mark Jubber.
