= Moritat (comics) =

American comic book creator (born 1969)

- Justin Norman at DragonCon in 2206
- Born: Justin Norman; 1969 (age 56–57) Mercer County, New Jersey
- Areas: Writer, Penciller, Inker, Letterer
- Notable works: Hellblazer, The Spirit, Elephantmen

Moritat (born 1969 as Justin Norman in Mercer County, New Jersey) is an American comic book creator, best known for his work on The Spirit, Elephantmen, and DC's All Star Western.

Moritat was the artist on the Hellblazer series that DC Comics published as part of their 2016 "DC Rebirth" initiative.

== Bibliography ==
=== Comics ===
- All Star Western (DC Comics 2011)
- Asylum (1993)
- Attractive Force (1997)
- Batman: Night of the Owls (DC Comics 2013)
- Black Canary #9
- Beauty of the Beasts (1991)
- Carnal Comics: True Stories of Adult Film Stars (1994)
- The CBLDF Presents: Liberty Comics (2008)
- Cursed Pirate Girl (Archia 2012)
- DC Comics: The New 52 (DC Comics 2011)
- Elephantmen (Image Comics 2006)
- Elephantmen War Toys: Yvette (Image Comics 2009)
- Elephantmen: The Pilot (Image Comics 2007)
- Elephantmen: War Toys (Image Comics 2007)
- Harley Quinn #28 - artist (dream sequence with Kevin Hanna) (DC Comics, 2016)
- Heavy Metal (1977)
- Image Firsts: Elephantmen (2011)
- The Justice League of America 100 Project (2011)
- Justice League of America 80 Page Giant (2009)
- Monsters & Dames (Art Book Series) (2009)
- A Night in a Moorish Harem (1996)
- Outlaw Territory (2009)
- PopGun (2007)
- Sheena: Queen of the Jungle (2017)
- Sizzle (1999)
- Solstice (1995)
- The Spirit (2010)
- Stray Moonbeams (2002)
- Teen Titans (2011)
- Transmetropolitan: All Around the World (DC Comics 2011)
