= Zombie Highway =

2010 video game

- Developer: Auxbrain
- Platforms: iOS, Android
- Release: iOS; 27 August 2010; Android; 18 February 2015
- Genre: Survival game
- Mode: Single-player

Zombie Highway is a survival game developed by American studio Auxbrain but removed from iOS and Android devices through their respective app stores. The game is a single-player driving game where the player controls a car and must try to survive as long as possible while zombies are jumping onto the sides of the car. Two sequels have been released: Zombie Highway 2 and Zombie Highway: Driver's Ed.

== Gameplay ==
In Zombie Highway, the player controls a car and must try to survive as long as possible while zombies are jumping onto the sides of the car. The zombies have their own health bars which can be depleted by shooting them. If there are enough zombies on the car it will topple over and the game will end. There are obstacles on the road that the player must avoid, which end the game if hit.

== Reception ==
Zombie Highway received positive reception from critics, garnering a rating of 76 out of a possible 100 on the review aggregator website Metacritic, based on 6 critic reviews.
