= Jesus Freak (film) =

- Directed by: Morgan Nichols
- Written by: Laura Lee Bahr
- Produced by: Amy Dawn Anderson; Pete Kuzov
- Starring: Laura Lee Bahr; Regan Forman; Pete Kuzov; Oded Gross
- Cinematography: David S. Danesh
- Music by: Dan Adams
- Production company: Movie Farm
- Release date: 2003
- Running time: 86 minutes
- Country: United States
- Language: English

Jesus Freak is a 2003 American micro-budget drama directed by Morgan Nichols. It stars Laura Lee Bahr, Regan Forman, Pete Kuzov, and Oded Gross, and tells the story of a teenage girl who, while struggling to find her identity in her small-minded town, brings home a man who is either her savior, a migrant Mexican, or both. The film was shot on location in Portales, New Mexico, where screenwriter and star Laura Lee Bahr grew up.

== Cast ==
- Laura Lee Bahr as Lily
- Regan Forman as Christy
- Pete Kuzov as John
- Oded Gross as Tom
- Josh Kantor as Jesus
- Robin Mullins as Lily's Mother

== Awards, honors, and festivals ==
- Jesus Freak won the Best Southwest Award at the Santa Fe Film Festival.
- Jesus Freak was a "sleeper hit" at the first Tallgrass Film Festival.

== Reception ==
Susanna Ulrich of the Los Angeles Film Festival said of Jesus Freak: "By turns wistful, poignant and offbeat, the debut feature from director Morgan Nichols ultimately captures the confusion of adolescence with a rare, touching grace." Variety said "There's a Claire Danes quality to Bahr's gentle, nuanced performance that solidly anchors the film."
