= Fist of Justice =

Publication information
- Publisher: Digital Webbing
- First appearance: Digital Webbing Presents #24, (July 2005)
- Created by: Ed Dukeshire & Mike Imboden

In-story information
- Alter ego: Marc Mason
- Partnerships: Blacklight
- Abilities: Superstrength.

Fist of Justice is a superhero comic book published by Digital Webbing. The series and its title character debuted in Digital Webbing Presents #24 (July 2005), and was created by Mike Imboden and Ed Dukeshire.

== Publication history ==
Fist of Justice started as a short story in the anthology title Digital Webbing Presents. Created by Mike Imboden and Ed Dukeshire, the first appearance of the character was drawn by Anthony Castrillo. Due to its popularity, it eventually became the main feature of the series "Digital Webbing Presents" in issues #29-33, published from June 2006 to June 2007. When Digital Webbing Presents was canceled, Fist of Justice was given its own title and ran from January 2008 until issue #5 which was published in July 2009. The series is written by co-creator Mike Imboden with a rotating list of artists including Chad Hardin, Yildiray Cinar, Dario Carrasco Jr., Anderson Nascimento, Andre Coelho, Pow Rodrix and Eduardo Savid.

In 2014, Imboden and Dukeshire launched a Kickstarter to continue the series picking up where they left off. The Kickstarter launched the publication of a "Volume One" trade paperback collecting the "Digital Webbing Presents" stories and "Fist of Justice #1". They also released issue #6 written by Mike Imboden and illustrated by Pow Rodrix. The series continues through Kickstarter, web sales, convention appearances, and digitally via ComiXology.
