= Jesusfreak (graphic novel) =

Graphic novel by Joe Casey

Jesusfreak is a graphic novel published by Image Comics in 2019 that was written by Joe Casey and illustrated by Benjamin Marra.

== Background ==
The graphic novel was published by Image Comics, written by Joe Casey, illustrated by Benjamin Marra, colored by Brad Simpson, and lettered by Rus Wooton. Casey announced that he was working on the graphic novel in 2018. An exclusive 16 page preview was available at the 2018 New York Comic Con. It was released in comic stores on March 20, 2019, and later in mainstream bookstores on March 26. It was published as a 64 page hardcover. Deadline Hollywood compared and contrasted the graphic novel with The Second Coming by Mark Russell. The comic uses 1970s style artwork and depicts Jesus using Kung Fu. The story begins in 26 C.E. and depicts Jesus meditating to overcome nightmares and visions. The graphic novel was not received well by Christians. Ryan Carey commented in his review that Casey and Marra work well together.
