= Digital Webbing =

American comic book publishing company

- Industry: Publishing
- Founder: Ed Dukeshire
- Key people: Ed Dukeshire
- Products: Comics
- Website: Official website

Digital Webbing is an American comic book publishing company founded by Ed Dukeshire.

== History ==
Digital Webbing's core publication, Digital Webbing Presents, begun in 2001, is a 32- to 56-page anthology title featuring stories from new creators generally culled from Digital Webbing's website community. The first 18 issues are black-and-white, with the title published in color from #19 onward. The content covers a variety of genres from horror to comedy, and has included such superhero features as "Fist of Justice". The company also published the Digital Webbing Presents Convention Annual in 2003.

Other series include the video game tie-in BloodRayne; Abigail & Rox, created by Joshua Gamon, Zombie Highway, created by Jason Pell; E-Man Recharged, a 2006 one-shot revival of Charlton Comics 1970s cult-hit superhero E-Man, by the original team of writer Nick Cuti and artist Joe Staton; Sword of Dracula; Warmageddon Illustrated, created by L Jamal Walton; and The McKain Chronicles: Battle for Earth by Mark Chernesky and "Crazy Mary" by Michael Colbert which is now at 01 Publishing with a graphic novel release.
