= Ashley Wood =

Australian comic book artist and illustrator

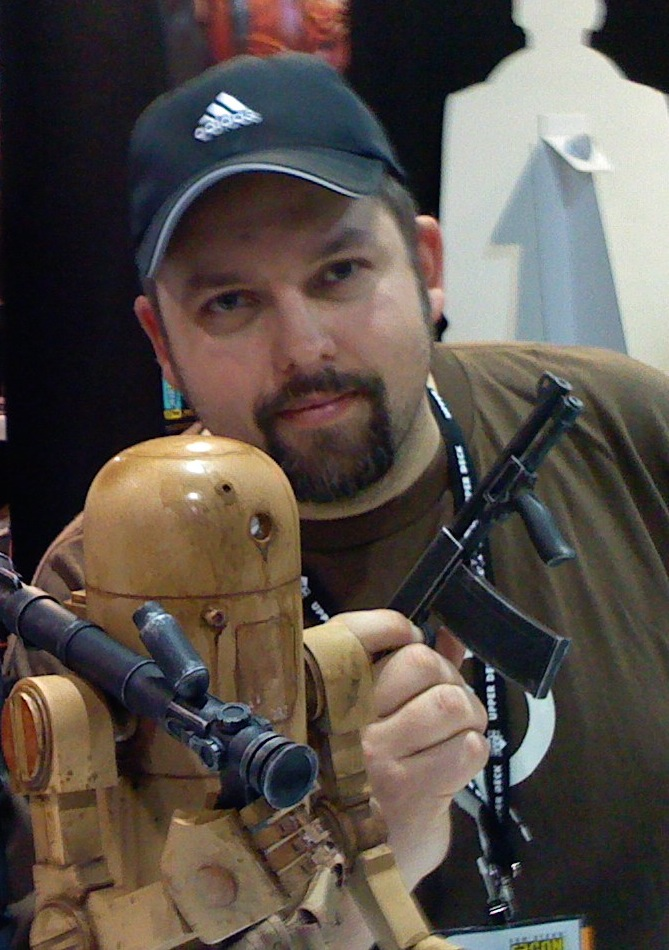
- Born: 1971 (age 54–55) Perth, Australia
- Area: Artist
- Notable works: Metal Gear Solid; Automatic Kafka; Popbot
- Awards: Spectrum Award (1999, 2002)
- Children: 2

Ashley Wood (born 1971) is an Australian comic book artist and illustrator known for his cover art, concept design and his work as an art director. Wood initially worked in both the UK and international comic book industries, working on characters such as the British character Judge Dredd, before breaking into the US market, where he worked for such companies as Marvel Comics and DC Comics. Wood later worked for Image, creating graphic novels and cover art for the various Spawn properties of Todd McFarlane, and projects with IDW Publishing.

Wood generally works in mixed media, often combining oil painting with digital artmaking.

== Career ==
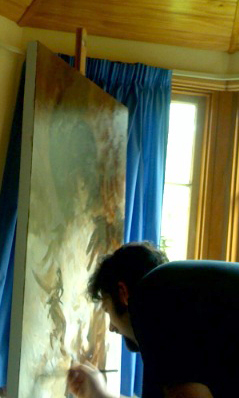
Wood working with oil on canvas for Popbot #8 in his studio

In 1991, Wood started work as the artist and designer for Alarum, a small independent press magazine. The same year he held his first solo exhibition in Perth. He then moved to Cyclone Comics, which he helped Gary Chaloner relaunch.

In 1993 he signed with Fleetway Publications, working on characters such as the British character Judge Dredd, before breaking into the US market, where he worked for such companies as Marvel Comics on Ghost Rider 2099 and Generation X, and DC Comics on The Invisibles. Wood later worked for Image, creating graphic novels and cover art for the various Spawn properties of Todd McFarlane, and projects with IDW Publishing.

Wood has contributed to both movie and TV projects, such as World War Robot for Jerry Bruckheimer and Lore which directors Barry Sonnenfeld and Dave Green were attached to direct at different points.

Working in conjunction with Konami and Japanese producer/director Hideo Kojima to produce Metal Gear Solid comics. Wood assisted in creating one of the world's first digital comics for Sony's PlayStation Portable platform, the Metal Gear Solid: Digital Graphic Novel. Following this, he also supplied art for the cinema scenes in the 2006 PlayStation Portable game Metal Gear Solid: Portable Ops, Metal Gear Solid: Peace Walker, and for the comic book adaptation of Metal Gear Solid 2: Sons of Liberty, which is receiving the same digital treatment as its predecessor.

In 2004, Ashley Wood and TP Louise formed 7174 PTY LTD., an Australian-based entertainment company. Operating from Australia on a global scale, 7174 is active in creating entertainment properties for the comic, film, toy, and video game industry among others. Ashley Wood is the creator of the Popbot and World War Robot series of graphic novels, Popbot is currently in film production with Resolution Independent and World War Robot is currently in pre-production with Disney Studios with Jerry Bruckheimer producing. Previous works include the graphic novel Lore which is currently in pre-production with Warner Brother's studio, with Barry Sonnenfeld directing initially; later, Dave Green was appointed as director, instead. Another Wood collaboration Zombies Vs Robots is currently in pre-production with Sony Pictures, with Michael Bay producing.

In 2020, Wood started another partnership with Chris Ryall setting up a new publishing venture called Syzygy Publishing.

== Awards ==
- 2002 Spectrum Gold Award for Advertising, for Popbot Blue
- 2002 Spectrum Gold Award for Comics, for "Luwona Angry"
- 2002 Award of Excellence for Illustration, Communication Arts

=== Nominations ===
- 2006 Eisner Award for Best Short Story for "Blood Son" (shared with Chris Ryall)
- 2006 Eagle Award for Favourite Comics Artist for Painted Artwork
- 2007 Eagle Award for Favourite Artist for Painted Artwork
- 2007 Eagle Award for Favourite Comics-Related Book, for Uno Tarino: The Latest Art of Ashley Wood
- 2011 Designer Toy Award for Artist of the Year

== Works ==
=== Comics and trade paperbacks ===
- Zombies Vs Robots
- Zombies vs Robots vs Amazons
- Popbot 1 - 8
- Popbot Reader
- Popbot Collection 1 (Collects issues 1–3)
- Popbot Collection 2 (Collects issues 4–6)
- Popbot Complete (Collects issues 1–7)
- Popbot Big Beautiful Book (Collects issues 1–8)
- Duo Stars (Issue 1)
- Automatic Kafka (Issues 1 – 9)
- Lore
- Metal Gear Solid
- Metal Gear Solid Sons of Liberty
- D'Airain Aventure (Issues 1, 2)
- Hellspawn
- 30 Days of Night (Original series covers)
- Spawn
- Doomed
- Ghost Rider 2099
- Doom 2099
- Tank Girl: The Gifting
- Sam and Twitch
- Silent Hill
- CSI
- Dampyr (Covers only)
- Dark Horse Down Under #1–3
- Shadowman
- Shadowplay
- Reptilia (Cover only)
- Transformers: Generations (Variant covers to #1–6)
- 24Seven Vol. 2 (Cover and Pin-Up)
- The Nightmare Factory OGN (Cover only)
- Children of the Grave TPB (Cover only)
- The Authority: Scorched Earth (Cover only)
- Uncanny X-Men #400 (Cover and some interior pages)
- Civil Wardrobe
- Kade: Sun of Perdition #4 (Variant cover)
- Grendel: Red, White and Black
- Star Wars Tales #16 (Cover only)
- Event Horizon Vol 1 and 2 Mam Tor Publishing (Sheriff 13 short in Vol 1, Closing Pandora short in Vol 2)
- Snaked (Covers)
- Miss + Mrs Volume 1
- Adventure Kartel Primer June 2011
- Next Issue Project: Fantastic Comics No. 24

=== Books ===
- World War Robot Volume 1 Illustrated
- World War Robot Volume 2
- Complete World War Robot (Collects volumes 1 & 2)
- World War Robot: 215.mm Edition
- Spawn Book of the Dead
- Investigation 1, Éditions Caurette & 7174 Publishing, 2022 (ISBN 978-2-38289-049-3)
- Investigation 2, Éditions Caurette & 7174 Publishing, 2022 (ISBN 978-238289-0509)
- Investigation 3, Éditions Caurette & 7174 Publishing, 2023 (ISBN 978-2-38289-080-6)
- Investigation 4, Éditions Caurette & 7174 Publishing, 2024 (ISBN 978-2-38289-117-9)

=== Art books ===
- Gutsie Gator
- Legger Boot
- Uno Fanta
- Dos Fanta
- Tres Fanta
- Sencilla Fanta (Sketch book)
- Sencilla Finale (Sketch book)
- Grande Fanta (Collects Uno, Dos and Tres Fanta)
- Grande Finale (Collects Uno, Dos and Tres Fanta + 20 extra pages)
- Extreme Finales (Collects Sencilla Fanta, Sencilla Finale and Grande Finale)
- Swallow (Books 1, 2, 3, 4, 5)
- Sparrow (Books 0, 1, 7, 14)
- 48 Nudes
- 48 More Nudes
- 96 Nudes (Collects 48 Nudes and 48 More Nudes)
- Uno Tarino
- Dos Tarino
- Tre Tarino
- Fat Tarino (Collects Uno, Dos, Tre Tarino)
- Snickety Snick series (3 books) + Big Gibbly Annual 2004 (One book collecting them all.) (sketch books)
- Chunky Bits
- F.I. #1
- Fuck It (Books 1, 2, 3, 4)
- Raw Fuck It Volume 1
- Fuck It Omnipuss (Collects Fuck It 1, 2, 3 Plus Bonus Material)
- Ashley Wood's Art of Metal Gear Solid
- Zawa-zawa: Treasured Art Works of Ashley Wood(978-4-7562-4656-1) PIE International

=== Toy books ===
- Apertore #1
- Entreat

=== Toys ===
- G.I. Joe Comic Packs (Hasbro Toys), Issue Covers No. 1, #21, No. 24
- Spawn HSI.011 (Todd McFarlane Toys)
- Spawn HSI.005 (Todd McFarlane Toys)
- Sam and Twitch STI.022 (Todd McFarlane Toys)
- Raven HellSpawn 2 (Todd McFarlane Toys)
- HellSpawn I.001 (Todd McFarlane Toys)
- Raven Spawn (Todd McFarlane Toys)
- Bearbrick Ashley Wood Bambalad (Medicom)
- WBR Brambleton Hardacre (Hyperchild)
- Popbot Polystone Statue (Sideshow)
- Popbot Exclusive Polystone Statue (Sideshow)
- Lady Sham Polystone Statue (Sideshow)
- Les Mort 13 (how2work)
- WWR Bertie: Desert Rat, Dirty Deeds, ZvR Warbot (ThreeA)(Bigshottoyworks)
- WWR Armstrong: Lunar Defense Camo, Shadow Guard, Suicide Club, White Engineer (ThreeA)
- WWRp Armstrong: Suicide Club 0G, Shadow Guard 0G, Lunar Defense Camo 0G, White Engineer 0G, Medic 1G, EMGY 1G, JEA Marine 1G, African defence 1G, Dead Deed 1G, Daywatch 1G, Nightwatch Og, Tokyo Toy con Exclusive (ThreeA)
- WWRp Bertie: Daywatch mk2 & mk3, Deep Powder mk2 & mk3, Desert Combat Sandy, Dirty Deeds, DIY, Dutch Merc Zwarte Torens, Hatchery Guard, Kruschev Memorial Guard Sabre MK2, Marine Jea Division mk2, Medic mk2, Nightwatch mk2 & mk3, Warbot (ThreeA)
- WWR Bramble: Deep Powder, Euro Div, Nightwatch (ThreeA)
- WWRp Bramble: Deep Powder, Desert, DIY, Euro, DIY, Euro(Red), Euro (Blue), Frosty Choad, Winter Defense, Grave Digger RPG, IDW Security X, Kruschev Memorial Guard RPG, Marine JEA, Medic, Dutch Merc, Phobos Defense, Pink Dazzle, 13th Calvary, 13th Calvary Commander, Daywatch, Daywatch Heavy, Nightwach, Nightwatch Heavy, Marine Jea Heavy, Afirican Defense Heavy, PRU Support Heavy (ThreeA)
- WWR Drop Cloth: 3AA EMGY, Daywatch, Desert, DIY, Jungler, Medic Zhivago, Monty, Nightwatch, Peaceday, Slim Red, Snowballer, Uncle 2 (ThreeA)
- WWR Large Martin: Big Red, Daywatch, Desert, Frosty, Iron Panda, Hatchery Guard, Nightwatch (ThreeA)
- WWRp Large Martin: Big Red, Daywatch, Deep Powder, Desert, Frosty, Iron Panda, Jea Marine, Modchip, Nightwatch, Norge Defense (ThreeA)
- WWRp Damn Large Martin: Auspublic Region Def, Big Red, Deep Powder, Desert, DIY, Iron Panda, Martian Dam Buster, Shitty Nine Iron Panda (ThreeA)
- WWR Squares: Daywatch, Desert, Dirty Deeds, EMGY, Euro, Frosty, Iron Panda, Lunar Camo, Medic, Merc, Nighwatch, Peaceday, Red (ThreeA)
- WWRp Squares: Deep Powder, Dirty Deeds, Dutch Merc, Euro, Frosty, Kruschev Memorial Guard, Jea Marine, Jea MiM, Medic, Warbot, ISO, Nightwatch, Daywatch (ThreeA)
- WWRp Grunts: Medic, Jea MiM, Jungle, Stealth, DIY, Desert, Deep Powder
- WWRp De Plumes: Nom De Plume, Noir De Plume, Gebi De Plume, Blanc De Plume, DIY De Plume, Kuan Ti Plume, Barguest de Plume, Jung De Plume, Von Nom, Spook von nom (ThreeA)
- Ma.K., Kow Yokoyama x Ashley Wood: 1/12 Kröte(camo), 1/12 Kröte exclusive(winter) (ThreeA)

=== Video games ===
- Contra: Shattered Soldier (PlayStation 2, 2002) – cover artwork and promotional illustrations
- Contra Advance: The Alien Wars EX (Game Boy Advance, 2002) – cover artwork and promotional illustrations
- Metal Gear Solid: Digital Graphic Novel (PlayStation Portable, 2006) – artwork
- Metal Gear Solid: Portable Ops (PlayStation Portable, 2006) – artwork
- Halo 3 (Xbox 360, 2007) – poster
- Halo 3: ODST (Xbox 360, 2009) – "Sadie's Story" artwork
- Metal Gear Solid: Peace Walker (PlayStation Portable, 2010) – guest artist
- Identity V (Mobile devices and PC, 2018) – guest artist

=== Home video ===
- Metal Gear Solid 2: Bande Dessinée (DVD, 2008) – artwork
