= Thought Bubble Festival =

Annual English comics art festival

- Status: Active
- Genre: Comics, Comic art
- Frequency: Annual
- Country: England, United Kingdom
- Inaugurated: 2007; 19 years ago
- Founder: Tula Lotay
- People: Managing director: Nabil Homsi; Festival Director: Chloe Green, Martha Julian, Amy Bellwood
- Website: www.thoughtbubblefestival.com

Thought Bubble: The Yorkshire Comic Art Festival is an annual comics art festival and comic book convention held in Yorkshire. Established in 2007, Thought Bubble has been credited as being the UK's largest comics convention. In 2023 Popverse named Thought Bubble "the most important comic convention around"

Thought Bubble takes place for a week in November each year, taking place all over Yorkshire, and culminates in a two-day comic convention in Harrogate. A dance party is usually held on the Saturday night before the festival's final day. The not-for-profit festival's chosen charity is Barnardo's.

Thought Bubble is held in the spirit of European conventions like the Angoulême International Comics Festival. As such, it is focused on the art and literature of the comics form, and only minimally on related pop-culture expression and merchandising. In addition to the exhibitor tables, Thought Bubble features art exhibits, animation screenings, panel discussions, workshops, and a costume parade.

Founded by Tula Lotay, one of the festival's aims is to celebrate female comics creators. Each year, the main image for that year's festival is illustrated by a woman. Lotay said, "Moving forward we're going to keep this theme alive and expand it to include other diverse groups within the industry. I can't wait to see the next set of wonderful images."

Beginning in 2011, the Thought Bubble Anthology, an annual collection of original comics, was released in conjunction with the festival.. From 2012 to 2016, the British Comic Awards were presented at Thought Bubble.

== History ==
In 2007, Tula Lotay, who grew up in West Yorkshire, founded Thought Bubble to promote comic books to the general public, especially children with reading difficulties. Her efforts were sponsored by the local comics and board games retailer Travelling Man, where Lotay worked as her day job. The first Thought Bubble was held in November 2007 as a one-day event in the basement of Leeds Town Hall. The 2008 convention, held at Savile's Hall, Leeds Dock, was followed by an after-party at the Alea Casino.

In 2010, the Northern Sequential Art Competition was held in conjunction with the festival; the first Thought Bubble Anthology featured comics by the winners, and expanded to include works from featured comics professionals. (The art competition was later branded as the Thought Bubble Comic Art Competition.) Thought Bubble Anthology #1, published by Image Comics, debuted in 2011, and issues came out annually through 2015. Issues #1–5 were collected in trade paperback form and published as the Thought Bubble Anthology Collection (136 pages, Image Comics, 2016, ISBN 1-5343-0067-8). All proceeds from the Thought Bubble Anthology went to the children's charity Barnardo's.

The 2011 festival sponsored a graphic medicine forum, "Visualizing the Stigma of Illness."

The 2013 festival featured the Thought Bubble Comic Art Competition; comics by the winners — Simon Gurr, Ulises Lopez, Ross Mackintosh, Lizzy Mikietyn, Zoom Rockman, and Charlotte Tuffrey — were featured in the Thought Bubble Anthology #4. The 2013 festival featured 450 exhibitors; the British Comic Awards presentation was hosted by Adam Cadwell and David Monteith.

In 2014, the festival invited its first overseas guests, including Natasha Allegri, Emily Carroll, Becky Cloonan, Danielle Corsetto, Adam Hughes, Jeff Lemire, Scott Snyder, Allison Sohn, and Jillian Tamaki.

The 2017 festival featured the exhibition "Heretics", folk-horror art based on the 2017 44FLOOD series created by P. M. Buchan, Martin Simmonds, and series editor Kasra Ghanbari.

In 2019, the convention itself moved from Leeds to Harrogate; the move mostly came about due to space constraints in Leeds.

Also in 2019, festival founder Lotay was awarded the Bob Clampett Humanitarian Award at the Eisner Awards ceremony, held at San Diego Comic-Con.

The 2020 festival was cancelled due to the COVID-19 pandemic; it returned to in-person status in November 2021.

In 2022, festival founder Tula Lotay announced she was stepping down as festival director to concentrate on her art career and family. Taking over as new managing director, owner of the comics and board game retailer Travelling Man, Nabil Homsi, along with Amy Bellwood, Martha Julian and Chloe Green becoming Festival Directors.

== Thought Bubble Anthology ==
Issue	Date	Notable contributors
1	2011	Becky Cloonan (cover), Mike Carey, Andy Diggle, D'Israeli, Duncan Fegredo, Antony Johnston, Charlie Adlard
2	2012	Tran Nguyen (cover), Kate Beaton, Ivan Brandon, Boo Cook, Warren Ellis, Tula Lotay, Sean Phillips, Gail Simone, Richard Starkings, Skottie Young
3	2013	Alice Duke (cover), Gabriel Bá, Jeffrey Brown, Mark Buckingham, Boo Cook, Ming Doyle, Brandon Graham, Jessica Martin, Fábio Moon, The Perry Bible Fellowship, Ramón Pérez, Richard Starkings, Cameron Stewart
4	2014	Cliff Chiang, Ales Kot, Boo Cook, Marc Ellerby, Barry Kitson, Sarah McIntyre, Emma Ríos, Hwei Lim, Tim Sale, Richard Starkings
5	2015	Babs Tarr (cover), Simon Roy, Brandon Graham, Farel Dalrymple, Rick Remender, Emi Lenox, James Romberger, Tim Sale, Marguerite Van Cook, Richard Starkings, Tula Lotay, Nicholas Gurewitch, Kate Beaton
6	2017	Jen Bartel (cover), Marley Zarcone, Jason Aaron, Cecil Castellucci, Brandon Graham, Jody Houser, Jason Latour, Emi Lenox, Simon Roy
7	2019	Helen Mingjue Chen (cover), Gerry Duggan, Brenden Fletcher, Lee Garbett, Jock, Kim-Joy, Tula Lotay, Luke Pearson, Richard Starkings, Becky Cloonan

== Convention locations and dates ==
This list documents the dates of the Thought Bubble convention, which is preceded by a festival in Leeds.

Dates	Location	Attendance	Guests
10 November 2007	Leeds Town Hall; Leeds	500	Kieron Gillen, Jamie McKelvie, Peter Doherty, Duncan Fegredo, Leah Moore, Antony Johnston
15 November 2008	Savile's Hall, Leeds Dock; Leeds		Mark Millar, Alex Maleev, Simone Lia, Jock, Yishan Li, Kieron Gillen, Jamie McKelvie
21 November 2009	Savile's Hall, Leeds Dock; Leeds		Ben Templesmith, Charlie Adlard, Andy Diggle, Bryan Talbot, Emma Vieceli, Lizz Lunney, Kieron Gillen, Jamie McKelvie
20 November 2010	Savile's Hall, Leeds Dock; Leeds		Tony Harris, John Romita Jr., Boo Cook, John Allison, Becky Cloonan, Steve Wacker, Sarah McIntyre, Dan Abnett, ILYA, Marc Ellerby, Tom Siddell, Abi Nottingham, OK Comics, Kieron Gillen, Jamie McKelvie
19–20 November 2011	Savile's Hall, Leeds Dock; Royal Armouries; Leeds		Adam Hughes, Tim Sale, Becky Cloonan, Jeff Lemire, 2000AD, Barry Kitson, Jordie Bellaire, Kate Brown, Dave Gibbons, Kieron Gillen, Jamie McKelvie
17–18 November 2012	New Dock Hall, Leeds Dock; Royal Armouries; Leeds	3000+	Kate Beaton, Mark Waid, Alison Bechdel, Jason Aaron, John Allison, Kate Brown, Jason Latour, Fiona Staples, Kieron Gillen, Jamie McKelvie
23–24 November 2013	Royal Armouries, New Dock Hall, London Alliance Hall; Leeds		Matt Fraction, David Aja, Kelly Sue DeConnick, Christian Ward, Fiona Staples, Rafael Albuquerque, Ming Doyle, Duncan Fegredo, Hope Larson, Meredith Gran, Olly Moss, Cameron Stewart, Kieron Gillen, Jamie McKelvie
15–16 November 2014	Royal Armouries, New Dock Hall, TB Tent; Leeds		Scott Snyder, Natasha Allegri, Danielle Corsetto, John Aggs, Cliff Chiang, Emily Carroll, Brenden Fletcher, Babs Tarr, Cameron Stewart, Kieron Gillen, Jamie McKelvie, Becky Cloonan, Adam Hughes, Jeff Lemire, Scott Snyder, Allison Sohn, Jillian Tamaki
15–16 November 2015	Royal Armouries, New Dock Hall, Marquee; Leeds		ND Stevenson, Rick Remender, Kate Leth, Farel Dalrymple, Jerome Opeña, Kurtis J. Wiebe, Jason Latour, DMC, Declan Shalvey, Sean Murphy, Joan Cornellà, Ollie Masters, Kieron Gillen, Jamie McKelvie
5–6 November 2016	Royal Armouries, New Dock Hall, Comixology Marquees; Leeds		Mike Mignola, Erica Henderson, Ryan North, Faith Erin Hicks, John Allison, Brenden Fletcher, Babs Tarr, Cameron Stewart, Kevin Wada, Kieron Gillen, Jamie McKelvie
23–24 September 2017	Victoria Hall,Leeds Town Hall, Cookridge Street, and Millennium Square; Leeds	13,000	Charlie Adlard, Antony Johnston, Gerard Way, Brian K. Vaughan, Jody Houser, Sara Pichelli, Sarah Graley, Alex Norris, Ariela Kristantina, Hannah Berry, Kieron Gillen, Jamie McKelvie
22–23 September 2018	Victoria Hall, Leeds Town Hall, Cookridge Street, ComiXology Marquee on Millennium Square; Leeds		Saladin Ahmed, Cully Hamner, Dustin Harbin, Sarah Graley, Leslie Hung, Janet Lee, Afua Richardson, Babs Tarr, Greg Rucka, Nicola Scott, Ben Sears, Victoria Ying, Brian Stelfreeze, Magdalene Visaggio, Sebastian Girner, Kieron Gillen, Jamie McKelvie
9–10 November 2019	Harrogate Convention Centre; Harrogate	11,000	Jhonen Vasquez, Brian Azzarello, Jenn St-Onge, Luke Pearson, Mahmud A. Asrar, Kim-Joy, Marc Ellerby, Cameron Stewart, Sweeney Boo, Alison Sampson, Gemma Correll, Kieron Gillen, Jamie McKelvie.
14-15 November 2020	Festival held online due to COVID-19 pandemic Online	N.A.	Chip Zdarsky, Babs Tarr, Jock, James Tynion, Emma Ríos, Cecil Castellucci, Charlie Adlard, Sean Phillips, Ronald Wimberly, Rafael Albuquerque, Christian Ward, Sara Alfageeh, Sanford Greene, G. Willow Wilson, Duncan Fegredo
13–14 November 2021	Harrogate Convention Centre; Harrogate		Joëlle Jones, Jock, Sara Alfageeh, Christian Ward
12–13 November 2022	Harrogate Convention Centre; Harrogate		Gail Simone, G. Willow Wilson, Christian Ward, David Aja, Magdalene Visaggio, Rafael Albuquerque
11–12 November 2023	Harrogate Convention Centre; Harrogate		
16-17 November 2024	Harrogate Convention Centre; Harrogate		

== In popular media ==
The festival's dance floor was memorialized in Kieron Gillen and Jules Scheele's "The Oral History of the Thought Bubble Dancefloor," published in the anthology Pros and (Comic) Cons (Dark Horse, 2019, ISBN 1-506-71167-7).
