= Farel Dalrymple =

American artist and alternative comics creator

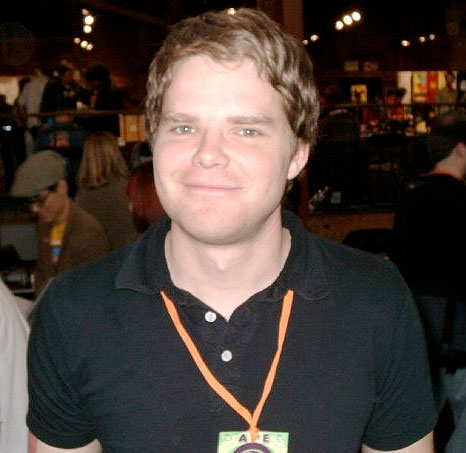
- Dalrymple, photographed at the 2004 Alternative Press Expo (APE) in San Francisco.
- Born: Farel DeShongh Dalrymple; 1972 (age 53–54) Hollywood, California
- Areas: Cartoonist, Writer, Penciller, Inker
- Pseudonym: Farel Dal
- Notable works: Pop Gun War, The Wrenchies, ROBOT TOD
- Awards: Xeric Award, 2000; Society of Illustrators Gold Medal, 2002

Farel Dalrymple is an American artist and alternative comics creator. He is best known for his award-winning comics series Pop Gun War.

== Career ==
Originally from Oklahoma "by way of California", Dalrymple is one of the founders of the New York City-based Meathaus Collective. He attended New York's School of Visual Arts as an Illustration major and has been creating comics since 1999.

Upon graduation, Dalrymple self-published Smith's Adventures in the Supermundane and included it in his application for a Xeric Award. He received the grant for his first issue of Pop Gun War and self-published the next four issues. Dark Horse published the collection in 2003. Dalrymple illustrated Omega the Unknown, a 10-issue series written by Jonathan Lethem and published by Marvel in 2007 and 2008. First Second Books published The Wrechies in 2014; and Image Comics published additional volumes of Pop Gun War in 2016 and 2017.

In January 2025, Floating World Comics began publishing Robot Tod, a full-color ongoing series.

== Awards ==
Dalrymple has received several awards, including a Xeric Foundation grant, a 2002 Society of Illustrators Gold Medal, and a Russ Manning Award nomination. An excerpt of Omega the Unknown was selected for the anthology Best American Comics 2010.

== Bibliography ==
=== Early work ===
- Behold 3D: "Sunship G'Hide-E1" (a, with Curt Fischer and Ray Zone, anthology, Edge, 1996)
- Proverbs & Parables (w/a, among other artists, 144 pages, New Creation, 1998, ISBN 0-9665118-0-8)
- Supermundane (w/a):
  - Smith's Adventures in the Supermundane (one-shot, Cryptic Press, 1999)
  - Supermundane #1-30 (irregular webcomic published on Dalrymple's and Meathaus' websites, 2000–2005)
  - Dark Horse Maverick: Happy Endings: "Happy Ending" (anthology graphic novel, 96 pages, 2002, ISBN 1-56971-820-2)
- Pop Gun War #1-5 (w/a, Cryptic Press (#1) and Absence of Ink (#2-5), 2000–2002)
  - Reprinted by Dark Horse, as Pop Gun War (tpb, 136 pages, 2003, ISBN 1-56971-934-9)
  - Reprinted by Image as Pop Gun War: The Gift (tpb, 144 pages, 2016, ISBN 1-63215-773-X)

=== Meathaus Press ===
- Meathaus (w/a, anthology):
  - "Honkey. Like donkey but with an "H"" (in #1, 2000)
  - "Rejection" (also the back cover illustration, in #2, 2000)
  - "We're all out" (also editor of the issue, in #3, 2000)
  - "Ms. Umbrella — part one" (also editor of the issue, in #4, 2001)
  - "Ms. Umbrella pt. 2 — grab your elbow skin" (also editor of the issue, in #5, 2001)
  - "The Regular" (in #6, 2002)
  - "Centillion" (in Love Songs (#7), 2004)
  - "i don't like anybody except for people i like" (also editor of the issue, in Headgames (#8), 2006)
  - "fotologica" (in S.O.S., anthology graphic novel, 276 pages, Nerdcore, 2008, ISBN 0-9800924-0-X)
- Beef Apt. #1-2 (w/a, collective sketchbooks — five pages of Dalrymple's drawings in each, 2002–2004)
- Go for the Gold #1-4 (w/a, collective sketchbooks, 2004–2011)
- Spigot (w/a, convention zine, 2006)

=== Dark Horse & Image Comics ===
- Grendel: Red, White and Black #4: "Devil's Retribution" (a, with Matt Wagner, anthology, 2002)
  - Reprinted in Grendel: Red, White and Black (tpb, 200 pages, 2005, ISBN 1-59307-201-5)
  - Reprinted in Grendel Omnibus Volume 1: Hunter Rose (tpb, 600 pages, 2012, ISBN 1-59582-893-1)
- AutobioGraphix: "The Tree" (a, with Richard Doutt, anthology graphic novel, 104 pages, 2003, ISBN 1-59307-038-1)
- 24Seven Volume 1: "Pirhanas" (a, with Jasen Lex, anthology graphic novel, 224 pages, 2006, ISBN 1-58240-636-7)
- MySpace Dark Horse Presents (anthology):
  - "Moist: Humidity Rising" (a, with Zack Whedon, in #17, 2008) collected in Volume 3 (tpb, 168 pages, 2009, ISBN 1-59582-327-1)
  - "Em and Gwen in: Magic Spell" (w/a, in #21, 2009) collected in Volume 4 (tpb, 176 pages, 2009, ISBN 1-59582-405-7)
- Prophet (w/a, with Brandon Graham and Simon Roy + Giannis Milonogiannis (#45), Extreme Studios, 2012–2014) collected in:
  - Remission (includes #24, tpb, 136 pages, 2012, ISBN 1-60706-611-4)
  - Brothers (includes #29, tpb, 172 pages, 2013, ISBN 1-60706-749-8)
  - Joining (includes #45, tpb, 168 pages, 2015, ISBN 1-63215-254-1)
- Island #4-5, 10, 14-15: "Pop Gun War" (w/a, anthology, 2015–2017) collected as Pop Gun War: Chain Letter (tpb, 176 pages, 2017, ISBN 1-5343-0192-5)
- Thought Bubble Anthology #5: "Nancy Boy" (a, with Rick Remender, 2015) collected in Thought Bubble Anthology (tpb, 136 pages, 2016, ISBN 1-5343-0067-8)
- Proxima Centauri #1-6 (w/a, 2018) collected as Proxima Centauri (tpb, 160 pages, 2019, ISBN 1-5343-1029-0)
- THE OFTEN WRONG, (tpb, 360 pages, 2019, ISBN 978-1-5343-1352-1)
- From Hell's Heart: "Typee" (a, with Herman Melville and John Arcudi, anthology graphic novel, 128 pages, A Wave Blue World, 2019, ISBN 1-949518-02-7)

=== DC Comics & Marvel Comics ===
- Caper #1-4 (of 12): "Market Street" (a, with Judd Winick, 2003–2004)
- Bizarro World: "Dear Superman" (a, with Dylan Horrocks, anthology graphic novel, 200 pages, 2005, ISBN 1-4012-0656-5)
- Omega the Unknown vol. 2 #1-10 (a, with Jonathan Lethem, 2007–2008) collected as Omega the Unknown (hc, 256 pages, 2008, ISBN 0-7851-3052-7)
- House of Mystery vol. 2 #22: "Fig and Strawberry" (a, with Matthew Sturges, co-feature, Vertigo, 2010) collected in Volume 5: Under New Management (tpb, 160 pages, 2011, ISBN 1-4012-2981-6)
- Marvel Knights: Strange Tales II #2: "You Won't Feel a Thing" (w/a, anthology, 2011) collected in Strange Tales II (hc, 144 pages, 2011, ISBN 0-7851-4822-1; tpb, 2011, ISBN 0-7851-4823-X)
- The Unexpected: "The Land" (a, with Joshua Dysart, anthology one-shot, Vertigo, 2011) collected in The Unexpected (tpb, 160 pages, 2013, ISBN 1-4012-4394-0)
- Fantastic Four #600: "Remember" (a, with Jonathan Hickman, co-feature, 2012) collected in Fantastic Four by Jonathan Hickman Volume 2 (hc, 832 pages, 2014, ISBN 0-7851-8900-9)
- New Avengers vol. 2 #34 (a, with Brian Michael Bendis, among other artists, 2013) collected in Volume 5: End Times (hc, 112 pages, 2013, ISBN 0-7851-6158-9; tpb, 2013, ISBN 0-7851-6159-7)
- Wolverine and the X-Men vol. 2 #11 (a, with Jason Latour, among other artists, 2014) collected in Volume 2: Death of Wolverine (tpb, 144 pages, 2015, ISBN 0-7851-8993-9)

=== Other publishers ===
- Typewriter #6: "Untitled" (w/a, with David Youngblood, anthology, Popzero, 2004)
- Jenny Finn: Messiah (a, with Mike Mignola and Troy Nixey, one-shot, Boom! Studios, 2005)
- Project: Superior (w/a, AdHouse Books):
  - Project: Superior: "Hollis" (anthology graphic novel, 288 pages, 2005, ISBN 0-9721794-8-8)
  - Superior Sampler #2: "The Awesomest Super Guy, Hollis in: Shadowsmen" (2007)
- Pop Gun War: Percevil (w/a, webcomic, Top Shelf 2.0, 2009)
- VICE (w/a, webcomics):
  - Blood Sisters (2009)
  - Untitled (2011)
  - Level 72 (2012)
- Papercutter #14: "Live with Our Clerics" (w/a, anthology, Tugboat Press, 2010)
- It Will All Hurt #1-6 (w/a, webcomic, Study Group Comics, 2012–2015)
  - Published by Study Group as a three-issue mini-series in printed form.
  - Collected by Image as a trade paperback (144 pages, 2018, ISBN 1-5343-0672-2)
- Delusional: the graphic and sequential work of Farel Dalrymple (w/a 232 pages, AdHouse Books, 2013, ISBN 978-1-935233-24-4)
- The Wrenchies (w/a, graphic novel, 304 pages, First Second, 2014, ISBN 1-59643-421-X)
  - Includes short story "fotogloctica" from Meathaus S.O.S. anthology.
  - See also: Remainder: A Wrenchies Story (TOR.com, 2014).
- Locust Moon:
  - Quarter Moon #4: "The Often Wrong" (w/a, anthology, 2014)
  - Prometheus Eternal: "Prometheus is Here!" (a, with Grant Morrison, anthology one-shot, 2014)
  - Little Nemo: Dream Another Dream: "Slumberland" (w/a, anthology graphic novel, 144 pages, 2014, ISBN 0-9899076-9-4)
- Captain Victory and the Galactic Rangers vol. 2 #3 (a, with Joe Casey, Nathan Fox and Jim Mahfood, Dynamite, 2014)
- Palefire (a, with M. K. Reed, graphic novel, 68 pages, Secret Acres, 2015, ISBN 0-9888149-7-8)
- Cayrels Ring #1: "Chapter Five" (a, with Shannon Lentz, Kickstarter, 2018)
- 20202020 (w/a 80 pages, Floating World Comics, 2022, ISBN 978-1-942801-26-9)
- MONSTER-US!!! (w/a with SOPH FRANZ, 64 pages, FLOATING WORLD COMICS, 2023, ISBN 978-1-942801-54-2)
- SEPT ‘n’ EMBER ( w/a 32 pages, FLOATING WORLD COMICS, 2024, ISBN 978-1-942801-66-5)
- ROBOT TOD #1-2 ( w/a FLOATING WORLD COMICS, 2025)

=== Covers only ===
- Getting the Sex out of the Way #1 (Meathaus Press, 2002)
- The Guild: Bladezz #1 (Dark Horse, 2011)
- Prophet #23, 40 (Image, 2012–2013)
- Once Upon a Time Machine Volume 1-2 gn (Locust Moon, 2012–2018)
- Deadly Class #1 (Image, 2014)
- Draw! #28 (TwoMorrows, 2014)
- Island #3 (Image, 2015)
- Seven to Eternity #3, 7 (Image, 2016–2017)
- Doom Patrol vol. 6 #5 (DC's Young Animal, 2017)
- Death or Glory #3 (Image, 2018)
- Black Hammer: Age of Doom #6 (Dark Horse, 2018)
- Grumble #3 (Albatross Exploding Funny Books, 2019)
