= Jack-A-Dandy =

Publication information
- Publisher: Image Comics; Maximum Press; Awesome Entertainment; Arcade Comics
- First appearance: Supreme
- Created by: Alan Moore and Rob Liefeld

Jack-A-Dandy is a supervillain created by writer Alan Moore and artist Rob Liefeld, as guided by Mort Weisinger. The character is modeled after the Joker and the Riddler to be the archenemy of comic book hero Professor Night, which is a character based on the Batman mythos.

Jack-A-Dandy dresses as an early twentieth century high society gentleman and creates havoc out of boredom. In one of the Supreme earlier stories, he teams up with Darius Dax to switch Supreme and Professor Night's minds, but the duo manage to reverse the effect and switch the minds of the two villains.
