= Brandon Graham (comics) =

American comic book creator (born 1976)

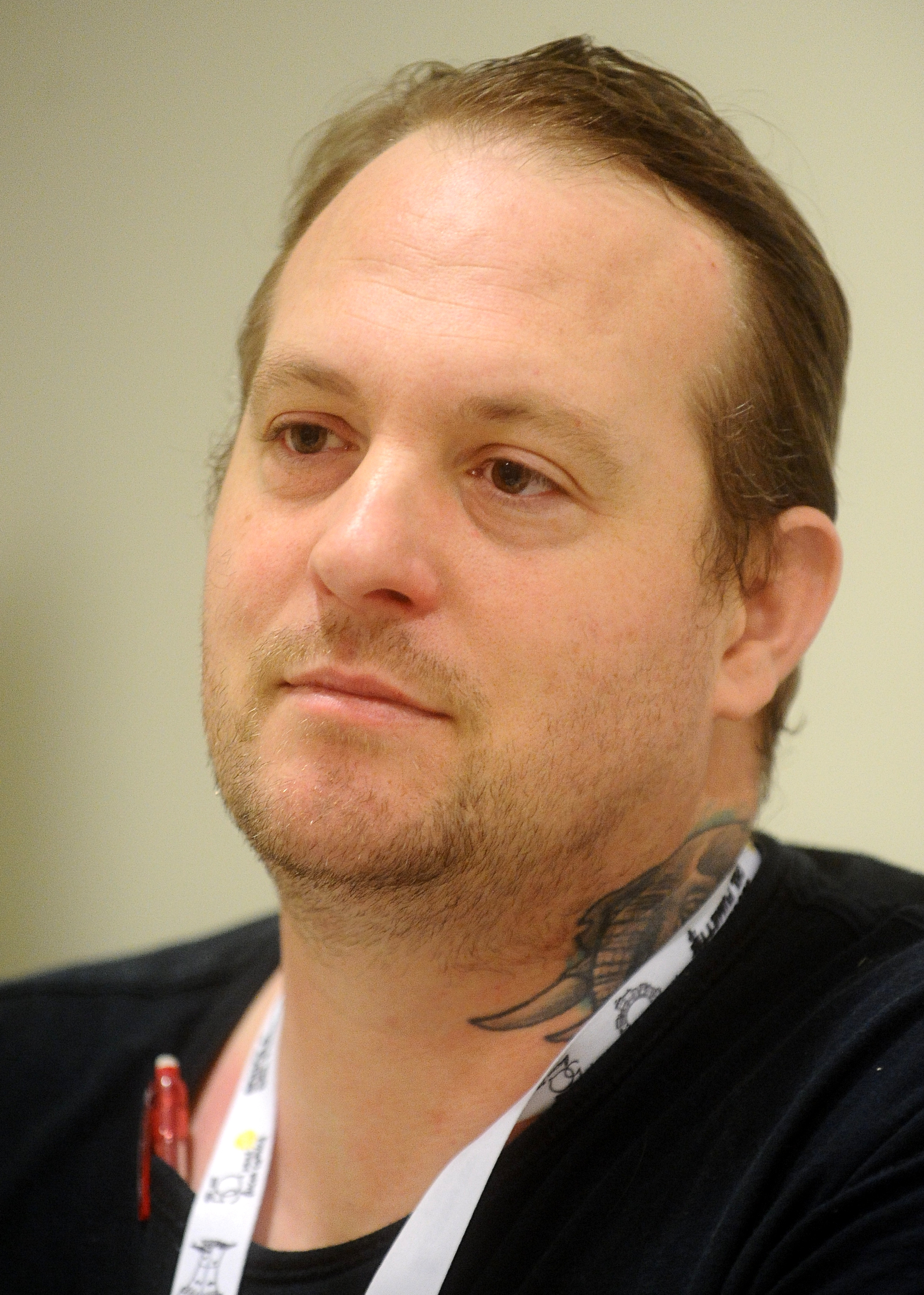
- Graham in 2016
- Born: 1976 (age 49–50) Oregon, U.S.
- Areas: Writer, Penciller, Inker, Letterer
- Notable works: King City , Multiple Warheads, Prophet, Island

Brandon Graham (born 1976 in Oregon) is an American comic book creator.

== Biography ==
Born in Oregon, Graham grew up in Seattle, Washington, where he was a graffiti artist. He wrote and illustrated comic books for Antarctic Press and Radio Comix, but got his start drawing pornographic comics such as Pillow Fight, Perverts of the Unknown and the initial issue of Multiple Warheads (Warheads would go on to become an ongoing, more mainstream comic published by Oni Press in 2007). In 1997, he moved to New York City where he found work with NBM Publishing and became a founding member of comics collective Meathaus. His book Escalator was published by Alternative Comics in January 2005, when he returned to Seattle. His book King City was published by Tokyopop in 2007 and was nominated for an Eisner Award. In May 2009 Graham announced that King City would continue publication at Image Comics and his Oni Press title Multiple Warheads would resume publication after a delay, this time in color.

At Image he led the revival of Prophet, a sci-fi reboot of Rob Liefeld's 1990s series, with a rotating roster of artists including Giannis Milonogiannis, Farel Dalrymple, and Simon Roy.

== Bibliography ==
=== Early work ===
- October Yen #1-3 (w/a, Antarctic Press, 1996)
- A-Bomb vol. 2 #1: "Blueprints" (w/a, anthology, Anthill, 1999)
- Meathaus #4-8 (w/a, anthology, Meathaus Press, 2001–2006)
- Radio Comix:
  - Milk! #7: "Paris Paris" (w/a, anthology, 1998)
  - Universe So Big #1-2 (w/a, 1999)
  - Mangaphile (w/a, anthology):
    - "Gone Fishin" (in #13, 2001)
    - "True Crime" (in #14, 2001)
- Sizzle (w/a, anthology, NBM Publishing):
  - "Perverts of the Unknown" (in #13-15, 2002) collected as Perverts of the Unknown (tpb, 64 pages, Eurotica, 2003, ISBN 1-56163-374-7)
  - "Multiple Warheadz" (in #18, 2003) collected in Complete Multiple Warheads (tpb, 208 pages, Image, 2013, ISBN 1-60706-840-0)
  - "Pillow Fight" (in #24-28, 2004–2005) collected as Pillow Fight (tpb, 48 pages, Amerotica, 2006, ISBN 1-56163-481-6)
- Heavy Metal Sci-Fi Special #2: "Devil and the Deep" (w/a, Metal Mammoth, 2004)

=== Image Comics ===
- 24Seven Volume 1: "Fire Breathing City" (w, with James Stokoe, anthology graphic novel, tpb, 224 pages, 2006, ISBN 1-58240-636-7)
- Popgun Volume 2: "Sputz" (w/a, anthology graphic novel, tpb, 472 pages, 2008, ISBN 1-58240-920-X)
- Tokyopop Presents: King City #1-12 (w/a, 2009–2010) collected as King City (tpb, 424 pages, 2012, ISBN 1-60706-510-X)
- Prophet (w/a, with Simon Roy, Farel Dalrymple, Giannis Milonogiannis, Ron Ackins and others, Extreme Studios, 2012–2015) collected as:
  - Remission (collects #21-26, tpb, 136 pages, 2012, ISBN 1-60706-611-4)
  - Brothers (collects #27-31 and 33, tpb, 172 pages, 2013, ISBN 1-60706-749-8)
  - Empire (collects #32 and 34–38, tpb, 128 pages, 2014, ISBN 1-60706-858-3)
  - Joining (collects #39-45, tpb, 168 pages, 2015, ISBN 1-63215-254-1)
  - Earth War (collects Strikefile #1-2 and Earth War #1-6)
- Multiple Warheads (w/a):
  - The Complete Multiple Warheads (tpb, 208 pages, 2013, ISBN 1-60706-840-0) collects:
    - Alphabet to Infinity #1-4 (2012–2013)
    - Down Fall (one-shot collection of all previously published short stories, 2013)
  - Multiple Warheads Vol. 2 (tbp, 128 pages, 2018, ISBN 1-5343-0676-5) collects:
    - Entries from Island issues #1, #4, and #15
    - Ghost Throne (w/a, 2018) single issue, final chapter completed the serialized story arc that began in Island
- The CBLDF Presents Liberty Annual '12: "King Kim: Barlartan Revenge" (w/a, anthology, 2012)
- Thought Bubble Anthology #3: "One Night in Comicopolis" (w/a, with Cameron Stewart, 2013)
- 8HOUSE #1-ongoing (w, shared-universe/anthology series spearheaded by Graham, 2015–...)
- Island #1-15 (w/a, anthology series featuring various artists from around the world edited by Graham and Emma Ríos, 2015–2017)
- The Wicked + The Divine #17 (a, with Kieron Gillen, Jamie McKelvie and Matt Wilson, 2015)
- The CBLDF Presents Liberty Annual ‘16: (Cover B, epilogue)
- Royal Boiler (w/a, collection of various art, 248 pages, 2018)
- Rain Like Hammers #1-5 (w/a, 2021)

=== Other publishers ===
- Oni Press:
  - Multiple Warheads #1: "The Fall" (w/a, 2007) collected in Complete Multiple Warheads (tpb, 208 pages, Image, 2013, ISBN 1-60706-840-0)
  - Resurrection vol. 2 #5: "Under" (w/a, co-feature, 2009)
- Arcana Studio Presents #6: "Creepsville" (a, with Bill Rude, Chris Wyatt and Kevin Hanna, Arcana Studio, 2009)
- House of Mystery Annual #2: "Madame Xanadu" (a, with Matt Wagner, Vertigo, 2011) collected in Volume 7: Conception (tpb, 160 pages, 2012, ISBN 1-4012-3264-7)
- Thickness #2: "Dirty Deeds" (w/a, anthology, 2011)
- Dark Horse:
  - Dark Horse Presents #7: "The Speaker" (w/a, anthology, 2011)
  - Empowered: Internal Medicine (a, with Adam Warren, one-shot, 2014) collected in Unchained Volume 1 (tpb, 208 pages, 2015, ISBN 1-61655-580-7)
- Walrus (w/a, collection of sketches, drawings and rare comics from 2009 to 2012, 112 pages, PictureBox, 2013, ISBN 0-9851595-9-6)
- The Infinite Corpse: 3 panel contribution (w/a, independent web comic)
- Living the Line:
  - Moonray: Book One: Mother's Skin (w/ Xurxo G. Penalta)(TPB 160p, 2023 ISBN 978-1-7368605-9-5)
  - Moonray: Book Two: Echoes of Ascension (w/ Xurxo G. Penalta)(TPB 160p. 2024 ISBN 978-1-961581-90-6)
  - Surviving on Mars (116p. 2024 ISBN 978-1-961581-02-9)

=== Covers only ===
- Wanderlust #2 (Antarctic, 1999/2000)
- Hack/Slash: The Series #13 (Devil's Due, 2008)
- Snakebomb Comix #1 (Snakebomb, 2011)
- Clockwork Girl hc (HarperCollins, 2011)
- Elephantmen #43 (Image, 2012)
- Orc Stain #8 (Image, 2012)
- Godzilla: The Half-Century War #3 (IDW Publishing, 2012)
- Burn the Orphanage: Born to Lose #1 (Image, 2013)
- Copperhead #1 (Image,2014)
- Shutter #1 and #25 (Image, 2014 and 2016)
- The Wicked + The Divine #8 (Image, 2015)
- The Beautiful Death #1 (Cover A)(Titan, 2017)
- Kid Lobotomy #5 (Cover B)(IDW, 2017)
- Rumble #10 (Cover B)(Image, 2018)
- G.I Joe #3 (IDW Publishing, 2019)
- Nomen Omen #4 (Cover C)(Image, 2020)
- Grrl Scouts: Stone Ghost #5 (Variant cover)(Image, 2021)
- Bolero #2 (Image, 2022)
- Interstellar Dust #1 (Brandon Graham variant)(Antarctic, 2023)
- Lovesick #6 (Cover C)(Image, 2023)
- Teenage Mutant Ninja Turtles #8 [Remastered] (Brandon Graham cover)(Kickstarter/Waverly Press, 2023)
- Penthouse Comics #4 (Cover H)(Penthouse, 2024)

=== Other works ===
- Love Is Calling Me (Cover art, music album by Joanna Wang, 2019)
