= Professor Night =

- Professor Night (bottom row, middle) on the cover of Supreme: The New Adventures #48. Art by Rob Liefeld

Publication information
- Publisher: Maximum Press (Image Comics)
- First appearance: Supreme: The New Adventures #43 (1996)
- Created by: Alan Moore

In-story information
- Alter ego: Taylor Kendall
- Team affiliations: Allied Supermen of America; The Allies

Professor Night is a superhero appearing in comic books published by Image Comics. Although his name is derivative of Doctor Mid-Nite, the character is otherwise intended be a counterpart of Batman. Professor Night works with Supreme both in a semi-regular partnership (a la World's Finest Comics) and as fellow founding members of the Allied Supermen of America, and its successor, the Allies (counterparts to the Justice Society of America and Justice League). He was created by Alan Moore and Rich Veitch and first appeared in Supreme vol. 3 #43.

== Fictional character biography ==
Professor Night's secret identity is Taylor Kendall. He lives in Kendall Manor, just outside Star City, with his Sikh butler, Pratrap, and his adopted daughter and biological niece, Linda Kendall, a.k.a. Twilight, the Girl Marvel, who partners him in crimefighting. Beneath Kendall Manor are the Halls of Night, Professor Night's secret base, where he keeps his advanced computer system, trophies of past cases, and his car, the Night-Wagon. The Halls of Night are also linked to the mythical underworld. The Professor and Twilight are afflicted with Porphyria's Complaint, which reportedly makes them less effective during the day but more alert and athletic at night, although they have nevertheless functioned well in daytime scenarios.

Professor Night's villains include Jack-A-Dandy, Lounge Lizard, Evening Primrose, Fake-Face and the Walrus and the Carpenter. Most of his enemies are criminally insane, and locked in the Miskatonic Mental Institution (a play on Arkham Asylum, and H. P. Lovecraft's Miskatonic University in the city of Arkham).

While Professor Night has been active as a hero since the 1930s, he and Twilight spent almost thirty years in suspended animation when their souls were stolen by one of their supernatural foes, explaining why they appear younger than their history with Supreme would suggest.

Professor Night and Supreme have long enjoyed a professional partnership and are also close friends, fully aware of each other's secret identity. When visiting the Prism World of Amalynth, Supreme sometimes takes the Professor Night-inspired identity of Doctor Dark (a reference to Superman's Batman-like identity of Nightwing). If accompanied by a partner, such as Diana Dane, Supreme assigns them the Twilight-inspired identity of Duskwing (referring to the Robin-like identity of Flamebird)

== See also ==
- List of Batman pastiches
