= Tula Lotay =

English comic book artist

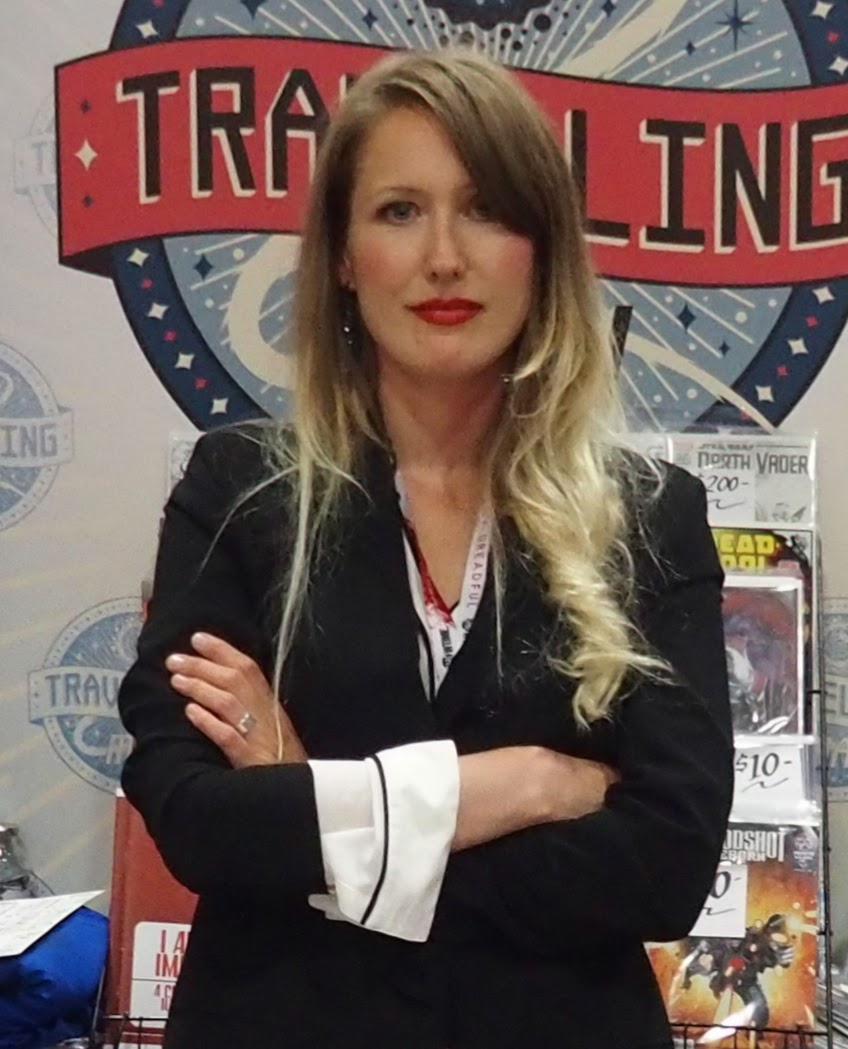
- Tula Lotay at the 2015 San Diego Comic-Con
- Born: Lisa Wood West Yorkshire, UK
- Area: Artist
- Notable works: Supreme: Blue Rose; Thought Bubble Festival
- Awards: Bob Clampett Humanitarian Award (2019)

Tula Lotay is the pen name of Lisa Wood, an English comic book artist. She is known for illustrating Supreme: Blue Rose, written by Warren Ellis for Image Comics, and for founding the Thought Bubble Festival, the UK's largest comics convention. She was also an artist for Si Spencer's eight-part series Bodies, published by Vertigo.

== Biography ==
Lotay grew up in Batley, West Yorkshire. She was adopted when she was a young child and had dyslexia. She attended Dewsbury College and the University of Bradford.

In 2007, while an employee of the local comics and board game retailer Travelling Man, she founded the annual Thought Bubble Festival to promote comic books to the general public, especially children with reading difficulties. Before becoming a comics artist, she was on the British Comic Awards Committee but resigned in 2013 to pursue a full-time art career.

Her first work was the cover art for Elephantmen No. 5 (2012), and in American Vampire: Anthology No. 1 (2013). She has also contributed to Red Sonja.

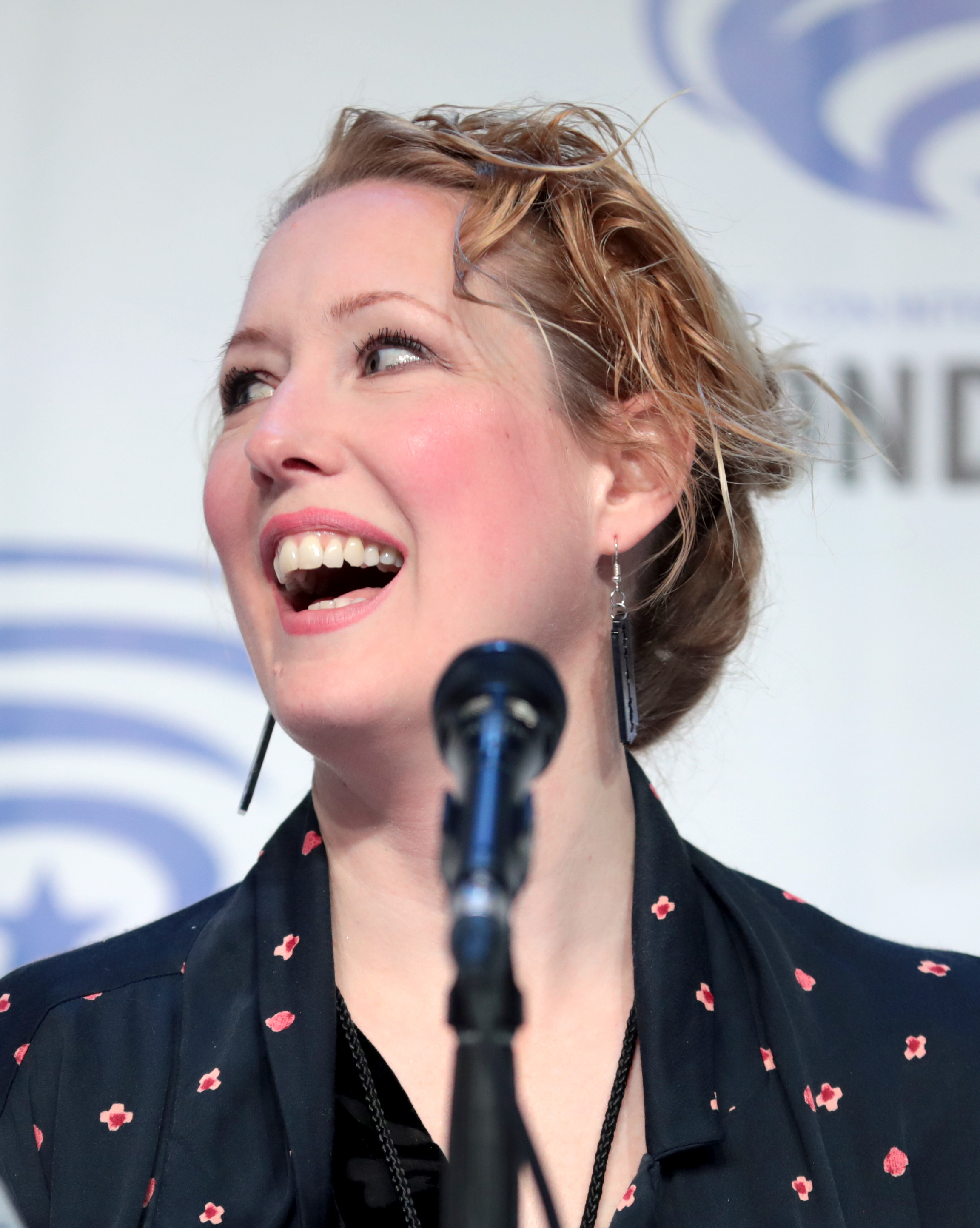
Lotay at WonderCon 2022

She illustrated issue No. 13 of The Wicked + The Divine, which was published in 2015 and nominated for a GLAAD Media Award for Outstanding Comic Book.

Lotay and her Supreme collaborator Warren Ellis announced in 2015 that they were working on a new comic, Heartless. As of early 2018, Heartless has yet to be released, but work was in progress.

In early 2022, Lotay stepped down as director of the Thought Bubble Festival to concentrate on her art career and family.

== Awards ==
In 2019, in recognition for her work in creating the Thought Bubble Festival, Lotay was awarded the Bob Clampett Humanitarian Award at San Diego Comic-Con's Eisner Awards. Upon receiving the award, Lotay said:

"It's such an honour to be awarded the Bob Clampett Award by Comic-Con International. Although given in my name, this award is really for everyone who works tirelessly to make Thought Bubble what it is; a lot of whom are volunteers, who work so hard for the love of the medium of comics. I feel I'm accepting this award on behalf of them. For Clark, Martha, Bis, Amy, Steve, Pete, Nabil, Mikey, Chloe and Billie, and the hundreds of volunteers, exhibitors and guests who've supported us over the years and helped make the show what it is. We are so excited to continue our outreach programme and make it bigger and better than ever."

In 2023, Lotay won the Eisner Award for Best Digital Comic for her work on Barnstormers: A Ballad of Love and Murder with writer Scott Snyder.

In 2024, Lotay won the Eisner Award for Best New Series for her work with Becky Cloonan on Somna: A Bed Time Story published by DSTLRY.

In 2025, Lotay won the Eisner Award for Best Cover Artist.

== Bibliography ==
=== Interior art ===
==== DC Comics/Vertigo Comics ====
- All Star Batman No. 7 (2017)
- American Vampire: Anthology No. 1 (2013)
- Bodies #1–8 (2014)
- The Witching Hour: One Shot (2013)

==== Dynamite Entertainment ====
- Legends of Red Sonja #3 (2014)

==== Image Comics ====
- Elephantmen #45 (2012)
- Supreme: Blue Rose #1–7 (2014)
- Thought Bubble Anthology #1: The Hound (2011)
- Thought Bubble Anthology #2: A Significant Portraiture (2012)
- The Wicked + The Divine No. 13 (2015)
- Zero No. 18 (2015)

==== Marvel Comics ====
- Scarlet Witch: Volume 2 No. 8 (2016)

==== Comixology Originals ====
- Barnstormers: A Ballad of Love and Murder #1-5 (2022–2023)

=== Cover art ===
==== Archie Comics ====
- Archie: Volume 2 #17C (2017)
- Betty & Veronica #1O (2016)
- Josie and the Pussycats #2C (2016)
- Jughead: Volume 3 #12C

==== Boom! Studios ====
- Curb Stomp #1A (2015)
- Fiction #1C (2015)
- Grass Kings #4B (2017)
- Joyride #1B (2016)
- Mighty Morphin Power Rangers #3E (2016)

==== Dark Horse Comics ====
- Briggs Land #1–6 (2016)
- Briggs Land #3B NYCC Exclusive (2016)
- Rebels #1–10 (2015 -2016)
- Tomb Raider:Volume 3 #7–12 (2016–2017)
- Night of the Ghoul #1B (2022)
- Barnstormers: A Ballad of Love and Murder #1–3 (2023)

==== Darryl Makes Comics ====
- DMC #1.5 Thought Bubble 2nd Print Variant (2015)

==== DC Comics/Vertigo ====
- All Star Batman #7A, #7C (2017)
- Black Canary: Volume 4 #1B (2015)
- Everafter: From the pages of Fables #1–10 (2016–17)
- Hellblazer #11 – 12A (2017)
- Shade the Changing Girl #1B
- Slash and Burn #1–6 (2015 -2016)
- The Wildstorm #1B (2017)

==== Dynamite Entertainment ====
- Blackcross #1B, #2A-6A Regular Covers (2015)
- Blackcross #1M, #2E-6E Virgin Art Covers (2015)
- Dejah Thoris #1C (2016)
- James Bond: Moneypenny #1A (2017)
- Miss Fury #1A-5A Regular Covers (2016)
- Miss Fury #1E-2E Virgin Art Covers (2016)
- Red Sonja: Volume 3 #1C (2016)
- Swords of Sorrow #1F, 2A-6A Regular Covers (2015)
- Swords of Sorrow #1Q, 2D-6D Virgin Art Covers (2015)
- Vampirella: Volume 4 #1C (2016)

==== Great Beast ====
- Blood Blokes #3 Rear Cover (2013)

==== IDW Publishing ====
- Archangel #1–5 (2016–2017)
- Jem and the Holograms #7C (2015)

==== Image Comics ====
- Codename Baboushka: Conclave of Death #1B
- Elephantmen #29 Flip Cover (2010), #54 (2013)
- Intersect #3B
- Southern Cross #1C Ghost Variant (2016)
- Supreme: Blue Rose #1–7 (2014)
- Supreme: Blue Rose #1 Travelling Man Exclusive (2014)
- Supreme: Blue Rose #1 SDCC Exclusive (2014)
- Wayward #14B (2016)
- The Wicked +The Divine #13B (2015)
- Zero #18A (2015)

==== Independent ====
- North Bend #1B (2016) - Kickstarter Project
- Girl With No Name (2019)
- Legion M

==== Marvel Comics ====
- The Amazing Spider-Man: Volume 4 #9E Women of Power Variant (2016)
- Black Widow: Volume 7 #1C (2016)
- Captain America: Sam Wilson #12B (2016)
- Civil War II: Choosing Sides #6B (2016)
- Gamora #1E (2016)
- Guardians of the Galaxy: Volume 4 #16C (2017)
- Star Wars: Han Solo #2C (2016)
- Vision: Volume 3 #2C (2015)

==== Titan Books ====
- Penny Dreadful #4A (2016)
- Vikings #1E Fried Pie Variant (2016)
- World War Tank Girl #2C (2017)

==== Valiant Comics ====
- 4001 A.D. #1B-4B (2016)
- Bloodshot Reborn #10E, #11D, #12D, #13C (2016)
- Divinity II #2D, #4D (2016)
- Faith: Volume 2 #2F (2016)

==== Art books ====
- Dirge (2014)
- Pequod (2015)
- Salome (2016)
- Sequoia (2017)
- Hiraeth (2018)
- Largo (2018)
- Blossom (2020)
- Blossom X (2020)
- De Profundis (2020)
- Shadow Self (2022)
- Fuchsia (2023)
- Eurydice (2025)
