= Prophet (character) =

Comic book character

- Cover art for Prophet #1 (1993) by Rob Liefeld.

Publication information
- Publisher: Image Comics
- First appearance: Youngblood #2 (July 1992)
- Created by: Rob Liefeld

In-story information
- Alter ego: John Prophet
- Abilities: Superhuman strength, speed, durability, and stamina; Master swordsman

Prophet is a superhero who appears in comic books published by Image Comics. Created by Rob Liefeld, he first appeared in Youngblood #2 (July 1992).

Prophet has starred in three ongoing series bearing his name; these monthlies debuted in 1993, 1995, and 2012, respectively. A fourth series, named Prophet: Earth War, began in January 2016.

== Fictional character biography ==
John Prophet, a poor and homeless man living in the World War II era, volunteers to participate in the medical experiments of Dr. Horatio Wells, a time-traveling scientist from the future. He uses DNA-enhancing methods to transform Prophet into a supersoldier. Prophet is engineered to serve the evil Phillip Omen and programmed with murderous instincts. Wells has a change of heart, though, and changes Prophet's programming from evil to a strong belief in God. Wells plans for Prophet to be placed into stasis for many years and then re-emerge in the future to help Wells' people fight the evil Disciples. Eventually found by Youngblood, Prophet awakens disoriented in a world he does not recognize, mistakes Youngblood for the Disciples and attacks.

It is later discovered that Prophet was not always in stasis after World War II, and was used as "a mindless weapon of war" in Vietnam. Stephen Platt, Prophet artist from 1994 to 1996, explained that the character "feel[s] responsible for the things that people forced him to do, even though he can't remember them. He's always thought of himself as a good person, and now he's discovering that the things he did were hideous by all standards of human decency. He's going to [...] take a spiritual journey to discover who he really is."

Despite his enhanced DNA and ability to communicate in all languages, Prophet was described as "very childlike" by Platt. "He doesn't know the social workings of the world that most of us take for granted: he can't hail a cab, and he eats ice cream too fast and gets a headache," Platt described to Wizard.

== Publication history ==
=== Creation and introduction (1992–2000) ===
Rob Liefeld told Wizard magazine in 1994 that he was inspired by Gene Roddenberry and Steven Spielberg to create Prophet. The character first appeared in Youngblood #2, released by Image Comics in July 1992. Prophet was originally intended to appear in the pages of Marvel Comics' X-Force. Liefeld explained to Wizard: "He was going to show up around #6 or #7 in my original plans, and the cover to Youngblood #2 originally had X-Force members looking on instead of Youngblood members. I soon decided that I was going to work on stuff that was creator-owned, so I pulled the character of Prophet and saved him for later."

The storyline in Youngblood led directly into Prophet's own title, which lasted eleven issues (including a zero issue). A second series, written by Chuck Dixon, premiered in 1995 and lasted eight issues. A one-shot was released in 2000 by Awesome Comics.

=== Image revival (2012) ===
Prophet #21 cover by Marian Churchland. The aesthetic of the series changed dramatically with this issue, along with the tone of the writing and larger design of the comic.

Image Comics announced at the 2011 New York Comic Con that Liefeld's line of Extreme Studios comics would return with the revival of five titles, including Prophet. Written by Brandon Graham with art by Simon Roy, Prophet continued the numbering of the previous series and launched with issue #21 in January 2012. The book takes place approximately ten thousand years in the future. Graham said, "In the first issue, Prophet has to blend into an alien city and find his contact to get orders. The city is in a living spaceship that died after it landed and is slowly rotting. The aliens that live in it are a fermentation-based caste society. In the second issue, in order to cross a desert, Prophet joins an alien caravan where each of these giant alien beasts feeds off the waste of the creature in front of it until eventually the waste becomes a refined product that they go around selling. Prophet gets mixed up in an assassination plot of the caravans leader." Graham added that one of his main goals of the series is to "out 'Conan' the current run of 'Conan'". The first arc revealed that there are dozens, or more, of Prophet clones scattered throughout the universe.

Prophet features a four-man rotation of artists: Roy, who drew the first three issues of the revival; Farel Dalrymple, who drew issues #24 and #25; Giannis Milonogiannis, who is illustrating six issues; and Graham, who drew issue #26. Each artist, Graham told website Newsarama, will focus on one main Prophet. "So when [Roy] returns on #32 he'll be drawing the same Prophet that he drew in his first issue. [Milonogiannis] will draw the old man Prophet's story and Farel Dalrymple is doing all the issues about the Prophet with a tail. I like the idea of each artist's style representing how the character they're drawing sees the world(s) around them."

The series concluded in July 2014 with issue #45, and the story continued in a new series called Prophet: Earth War, which began in January 2016 and ended with the sixth issue in November 2016. The entire storyline has been reprinted in 5 volumes, including the 2 issue Prophet: Strikefile miniseries.

==== Critical reception ====
In a review of Prophet #21, Newsarama's Scott Cederlund wrote that "Graham and Roy's revamping of an old Rob Liefeld character has a wild, untamed vibrancy that makes it more of a comic of today and not a rehash of a 15-year-old concept that only lasted for under 20+ issues." Charles Hatfield of The Comics Journal, in a review of issues #21 and #22, remarked that despite the book's "many obvious points of reference, Prophet casts its own spell, evoking its own fantastical reality." Oliver Sava of The A.V. Club said that issue #26 "shows the stunning storytelling possibilities that arise when an established character is paired with an innovative creator." Sava added that "the main lesson that Marvel and DC can take away from the success of Prophet is that the best way to revitalize a property is by finding people who create good comics and allowing them to do whatever the hell they want with it." The editors of Amazon.com named Prophet, Vol. 1: Remission – which collects issues #21-#26 – the fifth best graphic novel of 2012.

== Collected editions ==
=== Trade paperback (1993 series) ===
Title	Material collected	Publication date	ISBN
Prophet	Prophet #1–7	December 1998	978-1887279161

=== Trade paperback (2012 series) ===
Title	Material collected	Publication date	ISBN
Prophet, Volume 1: Remission	Prophet #21–26	September 2012	978-1607066118
Prophet, Volume 2: Brothers	Prophet #27–31, 33	June 26, 2013	978-1607067498
Prophet, Volume 3: Empire	Prophet #32, 34–38	February 12, 2014	978-1607068587
Prophet, Volume 4: Joining	Prophet #39–45, Prophet: Strikefile #1,2	March 31, 2015	978-1632152541
Prophet, Volume 5: Earth War	Prophet: Earth War #1–6	January 10, 2017	978-1632158369

== In other media ==
=== Film ===
In 1995, TriStar Pictures acquired the film rights to Prophet. A live-action film was planned with Rob Liefeld as a producer, but the project did not proceed beyond pre-production. In 2018, Studio 8 acquired the film rights to Prophet. In May 2020, It was announced that Marc Guggenheim will write the film's script. On October 7, 2021, it was announced that Jake Gyllenhaal would star in the titular role with Sam Hargrave directing. On October 21, 2022, it was revealed that Kurt Johnstad will write a new version of the script. On March 18, 2024, it was confirmed by Rob Liefeld that Gyllenhaal is no longer attached to star in the film.

=== Merchandise ===
Fleer/SkyBox International released a "Prophet Collection" series of trading cards in 1996. Approximately half of the set's 90 cards were created by Stephen Platt. Additional artists included Liefeld, Jim Lee, Todd McFarlane, and Mike Deodato. A Prophet action figure was produced in 1997 by Awesome Toys, a division of Liefeld's Awesome Entertainment.
