= Giannis Milonogiannis =

Greek comic book artist (born 1988)

- Born: December 11, 1988 (age 37) Maryland, U.S.
- Areas: Writer, Penciller, Inker
- Notable works: Old City Blues, Prophet

Giannis Milonogiannis (Greek: Γιάννης Μυλωνογιάννης; born December 11, 1988) is a Greek comic book artist who was born in Maryland and grew up on the island of Crete, Greece. He first gained prominence in the American market with his English-language webcomic Old City Blues which was released in physical form by Archaia. From 2012 to 2016 he was one of the co-plotters and artists on Brandon Graham's relaunch of Extreme Studios' Prophet.

== Bibliography ==
=== Works in Greek ===
- Roppongi #1-2 (zine, 2006)
- To Aima pou Katourao (w/a, with Anastasia Tsiatsos, zine, 2008)

=== Works in English ===
- Oceania-2 (w/a, webcomic, 2010)
- Large Mobile Gun Force (w/a, webcomic, 2010)
- Old City Blues (w/a, webcomic, 2010–...) collected as:
  - Volume 1 (collects #1-4 + "Interrupt Handler" short story, hc, 120 pages, Archaia, 2011, ISBN 1-936393-20-4)
  - Volume 2 (collects #5-10, tpb, 200 pages, Archaia, 2013, ISBN 1-939867-02-9)
- Our Kind (w/a, a Batman fan/webcomic, 2010)
- Aptera (w/a, unfinished webcomic, 2010)
- Twisted Savage Dragon Funnies: "Wrong Turn" (a, with Paul Maybury, anthology, 128 pages, Image, 2011, ISBN 1-60706-402-2)
- Prophet (w/a, with Brandon Graham, Simon Roy and various artists, Extreme Studios, 2012–2016) collected as:
  - Remission (includes #25, tpb, 136 pages, 2012, ISBN 1-60706-611-4)
  - Brothers (includes #27-28, 30-31 and 33, tpb, 172 pages, 2013, ISBN 1-60706-749-8)
  - Empire (includes #35-38, tpb, 128 pages, 2014, ISBN 1-60706-858-3)
  - Joining (includes #39-43, 45 and Strikefile #1-2, tpb, 168 pages, 2015, ISBN 1-63215-254-1)
  - Earth War (includes Earth War #1 and 4-6, tpb, 168 pages, 2016, ISBN 1-63215-836-1)
- Spera (a, with Josh Tierney, anthology graphic novels, Archaia):
  - Volume 2: "Chapter One" (168 pages, 2013, ISBN 1-936393-76-X)
  - Volume 3: "Steamed Horror" (short story, 176 pages, 2013, ISBN 1-939867-01-0)
  - Ascension of the Starless: "Chapter One" (168 pages, 2014, ISBN 1-60886-414-6)
- All-New Ultimates #7-9 (a, with Michel Fiffe, 2014) collected in Volume 2: No Gods, no Masters (tpb, 136 pages, 2015, ISBN 0-7851-5428-0)
- Pressure/Sensitivity: "Combat Robot Rhynie" (w/a, digital anthology, Wacom, 2015)
- Tyr Wyrmwood: Dragon Hunter (a, with Nuno Xei, digital one-shot, Comixology, 2015)
- IDW Publishing:
  - TMNT: Bebop & Rocksteady Destroy Everything #1-2 (a, with Ben Bates, Dustin Weaver and Sophie Campbell, 2016)
  - G.I. Joe: Revolution (a, with Aubrey Sitterson, one-shot, 2016)

=== Covers only ===
- Prophet #24 (Image, 2012)
- Revenger #2 (Square Peg, 2013)
- Halogen #1 (Archaia, 2015)
- Atomic Robo and the Ring of Fire #2 (IDW Publishing, 2015)
- The Transformers vs. G.I. Joe #12 (IDW Publishing, 2016)
- Judge Dredd v2 #6 (IDW Publishing, 2016)
