= DSTLRY =

American comic book publishing company

- Status: Active
- Founded: 2023
- Founder: David Steinberger and Chip Mosher
- Country of origin: United States
- Publication types: Comics
- Fiction genres: Sci-fi; Horror; Fantasy
- Official website: www.dstlry.co

DSTLRY (stylized DSTLRY and pronounced "Distillery") is an independent creator-owned American comic book publisher founded in 2023 by David Steinberger and Chip Mosher.

DSTLRY releases miniseries, usually with three or four issues. The single issues are 48-page, magazine-sized, and perfect bound. Once a series is completed, it will be released in a hardcover collection. Additionally, DSTLRY produces merchandize such as card games, soundtracks and vinyl figures.

== History ==
David Steinberger, the co-founder and former chief executive officer of comiXology and Chip Mosher, the former head of content at comiXology, announced DSTLRY on April 13, 2023, in The New York Times.

David Steinberger said that DSTLRY will focus on ethics, creator empowerment, and equity. Along with up-front participation by the founding creators, DSTLRY sets aside an additional 3% of company equity to be distributed among the creators who have projects released within the first three years. This equity will be distributed based on performance of titles.

As reported by Forbes, David Steinberger stated, "One of the biggest things that made comiXology successful was our understanding of the industry pain points. Obviously we want to correct the situation with creator rights by giving them real equity and ownership. If they contribute to the success of our brand, they get to benefit from that. When you align the interests of the creator and the publisher, we all share in the rewards." Furthermore Steinberger continued, "We want to avoid all the scams and issues associated with crypto, so there are no wallets, no NFTs, no cryptocurrency components. At the same time, we recognize that collectability is a fundamental part of the comics community. When we did straight digital distribution, we were only able to get about 15% of the total market. With DSTLRY, rather than fighting against the collector aspect, we are playing into it."

In July 2024, DSTLRY left their distributor Lunar Distribution to sign a multi-year exclusive deal with Diamond Comic Distributors. However, Diamond filed for bankruptcy in January 2025. The shift to another new distributor in July 2025, this time Penguin Random House, resulted in massive delays and cancellations to the scheduled books.

== Publication history ==
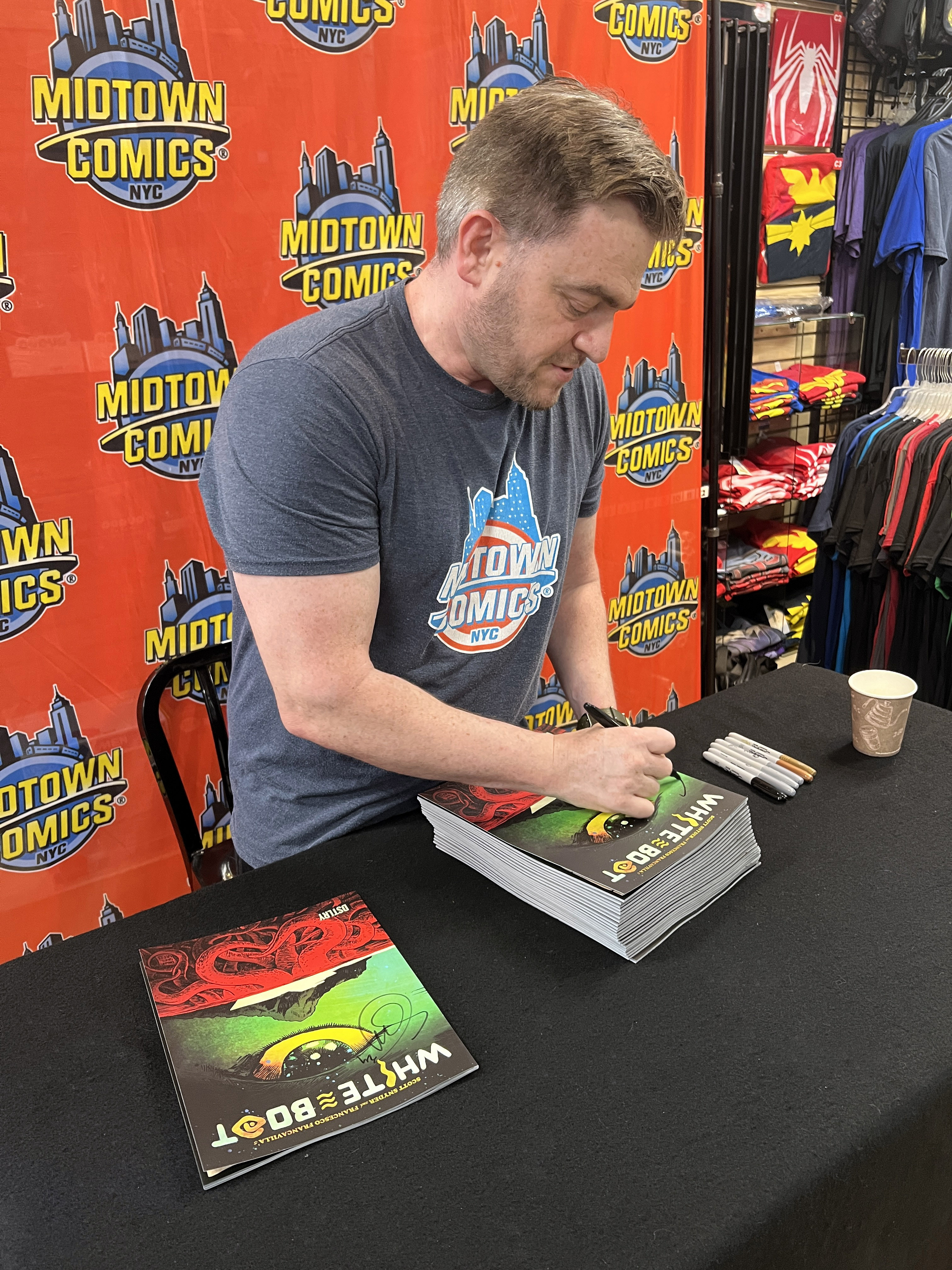
Writer Scott Snyder at a May 2024 signing for White Boat at Midtown Comics in Manhattan

DSTLRY's debut publication, The Devil's Cut, received 50,000 orders from comic book retailers and sales made from San Diego Comic-Con. The Devil's Cut contains 11 different stories, all from the founding creators. This initial issue is never to be re-printed in its initial 88-page format. Many of the stories in The Devil's Cut expanded into comic book series in the fourth quarter of 2023. DSTLRY co-founders Chip Mosher and David Steinberger said in a joint statement, "We're overjoyed by The Devil's Cut's reception... Our goal is to provide the most nurturing environment for creators to craft their best work and package that into premium formats. We couldn't be happier that retailers are as excited by The Devil's Cut as we are."

In October 2023 DSTLRY launched its first title, Gone, a 48-page science fiction adventure written, drawn and colored by Jock as a continuation of his eight-page story, "The Stowaway" from The Devil's Cut.

In November 2023, the company published Somna: A Bedtime Story, which was written and drawn by Becky Cloonan and Tula Lotay. The series is described as "an intoxicating blend of horror, eroticism, and the supernatural." Somna: A Bedtime Story was the recipient of the 2024 Eisner Award for Best New Series.

== Founding creators ==
- Mirka Andolfo
- Brian Azzarello
- Marc Bernardin
- Elsa Charretier
- Becky Cloonan
- Lee Garbett
- Jock
- Joëlle Jones
- Tula Lotay
- Jamie McKelvie
- Junko Mizuno
- Stephanie Phillips
- Scott Snyder
- James Tynion IV
- Ram V

== List of publications ==
=== Series ===
Title	Issues	Writer	Artist	Colorist	Start date	Conclusion date
Gone	#1–3	Jock			October 4, 2023	April 24, 2024
Somna: A Bedtime Story	#1–3	Becky Cloonan; Tula Lotay		Lee Loughridge; Dee Cunniffe	November 15, 2023	March 27, 2024
Blasfamous	#1–3	Mirka Andolfo			December 20, 2023	June 19, 2024
White Boat	#1–3	Scott Snyder	Francesco Francavilla		March 20, 2024	July 8, 2024
Spectregraph	#1–4	James Tynion IV	Christian Ward		April 10, 2024	December 18, 2024
The Blood Brothers Mother	#1–4	Brian Azzarello	Eduardo Risso		May 1, 2024	July 16, 2025
Life	#1–6	Brian Azzarello; Stephanie Phillips	Danijel Zezelj	Lee Loughridge	August 21, 2024	October 1, 2025
The Big Burn	#1–3	Joe Henderson	Lee Garbett	Lee Loughridge	July 24, 2024	January 8, 2025
The Missionary	#1–3	Ryan Stegman	Jason Howard	Tamra Bonvillain	September 4, 2024	July 30, 2025
Time Waits	#1–3	Chip Zdarsky; David Brothers	Marcus To	Matt Wilson	September 11, 2024	January 8, 2025
One for Sorrow	#1–3	Jamie McKelvie			November 6, 2024	To be confirmed
The City Beneath Her Feet	#1–3	James Tynion IV	Elsa Charretier	Jordie Bellaire	December 11, 2024	To be confirmed
Warm Fusion	#1–3	Scott Hoffman	Alberto Ponticelli	Lee Loughridge	December 11, 2024	July 2, 2025
You Won't Feel a Thing	#1–3	Scott Snyder	Jock	Jock; Lee Loughridge	January 15, 2025	To be confirmed
White House Robot Romance	#1–3	Chip Zdarsky	Rachael Scott	Tamra Bonvillain	September 3, 2025	To be confirmed
Endeavour	#1–3	Stephanie Phillips	Marc Laming	Lee Loughridge	November 8, 2025	To be confirmed

=== One-shots ===
Title	Writer(s)	Artist(s)	Colorist(s)	Release date
The Devil's Cut	Scott Snyder; Brian Azzarello; Marc Bernardin; James Tynion IV; Ram V. Stephanie Phillips; Becky Cloonan; Jamie McKelvie; Jock; Mirka Andolfo; Tula Lotay; Elsa Charretier & Pierrick Colinet	Becky Cloonan; Jamie McKelvie; Mirka Andolfo; Tula Lotay; Elsa Charretier; Eduardo Risso; Francesco Francavilla; Lee Garbett; Jock; Christian Ward; Joëlle Jones; Junko Mizuno; Ariela Kristantina	Lee Loughridge; Nick Filardi	August 30, 2023
Come Find Me: An Autumnal Offering	Joe Pavelka; Becky Cloonan; Molly Mendoza; Vanesa R. Del Rey; Celine Loup; E.M. Carroll	HamletMachine; Becky Cloonan; Molly Mendoza; Vanesa R. Del Rey; Andrew Betsch; Celine Loup; E.M. Carroll	HamletMachine; Lee Loughridge; John Starr; Celine Loup; E.M. Carroll	October 30, 2024
Through the Boughs: A Yuletide Offering	Patrick McHale; J.K. Sweeney Boo; James Tynion IV; Molly Mendoza; Ryan Andrews; K. Wroten; Grim Wilkins	Jim Campbell; Sweeney Boo; Jensine Eckwall; Molly Mendoza; Ryan Andrews; K. Wroten; Grim Wilkins		December 11, 2024
