= Babs Tarr =

American freelance comic book artist (born 1987)

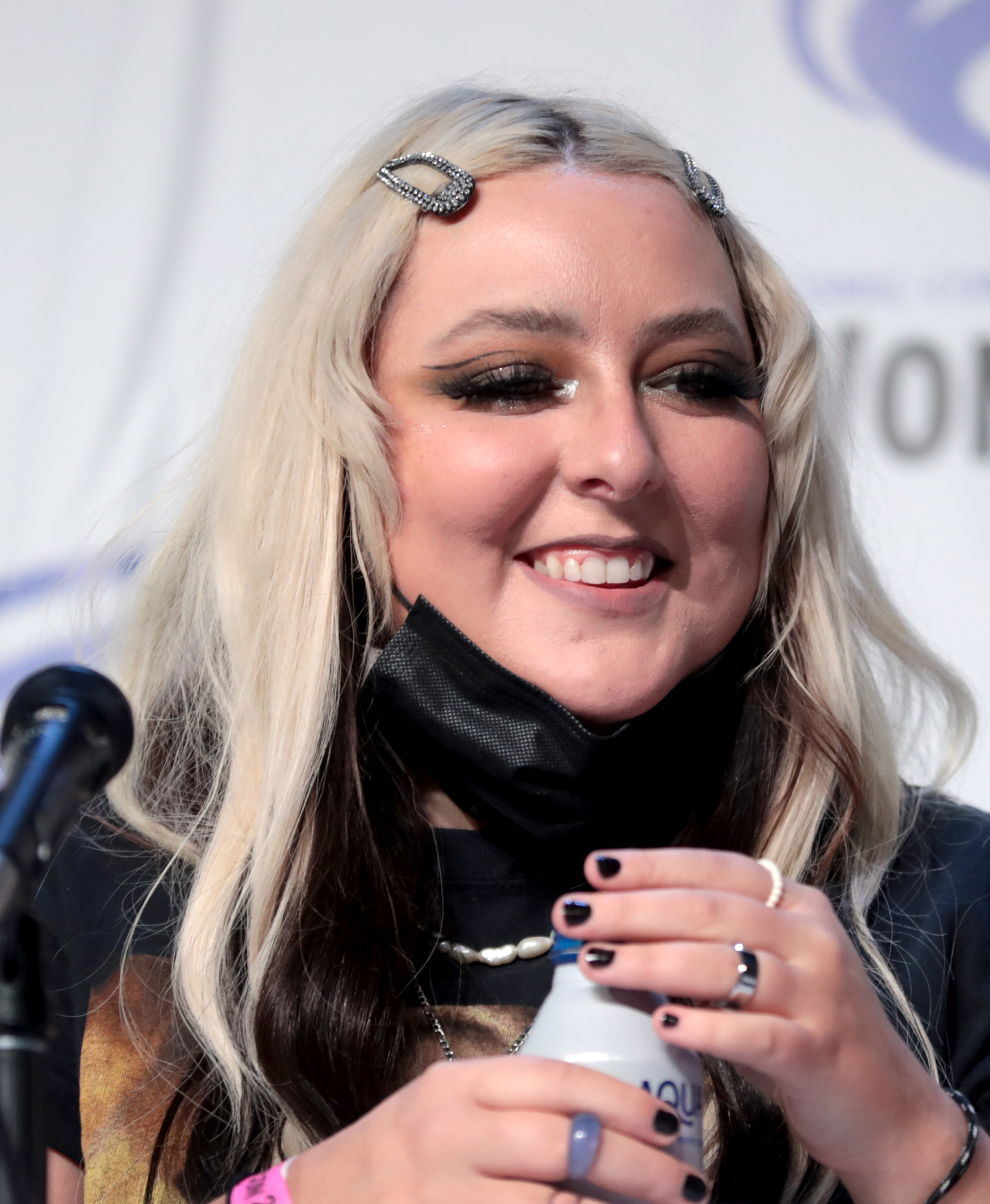
- Tarr at the 2022 WonderCon
- Born: Barbara Tarr; November 12, 1987 (age 39)
- Pseudonym: Babs Tarr
- Notable works: Batgirl; Motor Crush

Barbara Tarr (also known as Babs Tarr) is an American freelance comic book artist who has worked for DC Comics and Image Comics. She is best known for her work on Batgirl and for her Japanese-style illustrations.

== Early life ==
Babs Tarr grew up in Charleston, South Carolina. She went to Bishop England High School, after which she studied Printmaking at Osaka University of Arts and Illustration at Maryland Institute College of Art, where she received her BFA in Illustration.

== Career ==
In 2014, Tarr's Japanese-influenced fan art caught the eye of DC Comics, and they hired her to draw a new Batgirl series. She later became the first long-term female artist to work on a Bat-Comic. Since then, she has been worked on titles published by DC's Young Animal imprint, Marvel Comics, and Image Comics. Early issues of Batgirl were sketched out by Cameron Stewart, and then passed over to Tarr to color, add details to, and enhance. Since then, Tarr has illustrated and drawn covers for other DC Comics series, such as Black Canary and Gotham Academy. She has also worked for Hasbro, Disney, Boom! Comics, The San Francisco Chronicle, The Boston Globe, and Brand X. Her manga-inspired style has become more popular after Batgirl's popularity in the comic book industry, and it has found its way into other comics that Tarr has worked on.

Tarr's Sailor Moon Motorcycle Girls illustration inspired Cameron Stewart and Brenden Fletcher to write two villains for Batgirl #36 based on Tarr's illustration.

In 2016, Tarr stopped working on Batgirl and moved on to work on Image Comics' Motor Crush series where she worked as an artist and writer.

In 2019, Tarr co-hosted the web series Pub Draw on the Critical Role Twitch and YouTube channels. Each week, Tarr would teach co-host Marisha Ray and occasionally a guest how to draw characters from Critical Role, on which Ray is a star.

== Bibliography ==
=== Artist ===
- Batgirl Vol. 4 #35–50 (2014)
- DC Sneak Peek: Batgirl (2015)
- Motor Crush #1–5, 7–11
- Batgirl: A Celebration of 50 Years (2017)
- Batgirl: An Adult Coloring Book (2017)

=== Variant Cover ===
- Batgirl Vol 4 #52 (2016)
- Black Canary #2
- Gotham Academy #6 (2015)
- Justice League Vol. 2 #39 (2015)
- Bombshells United #1
- Doom Patrol Vol. 6 #1
- Southern Bastards #16 (2017)
- Stranger Things #1 (2018)
- Loki #2 (2019)

=== Cover ===
- Batgirl Vol. 4 #44, 45, 47–52
- Convergence Superboy #1–2 (2015)
- Mighty Morphin Power Rangers: Pink (2017)
- Motor Crush #2–11
- Southern Bastards #19 (2017)

=== Penciller ===
- Young Gotham Sampler

=== Writer ===
- Motor Crush #4–11
