= Rob Liefeld =

American comic book creator (born 1967)

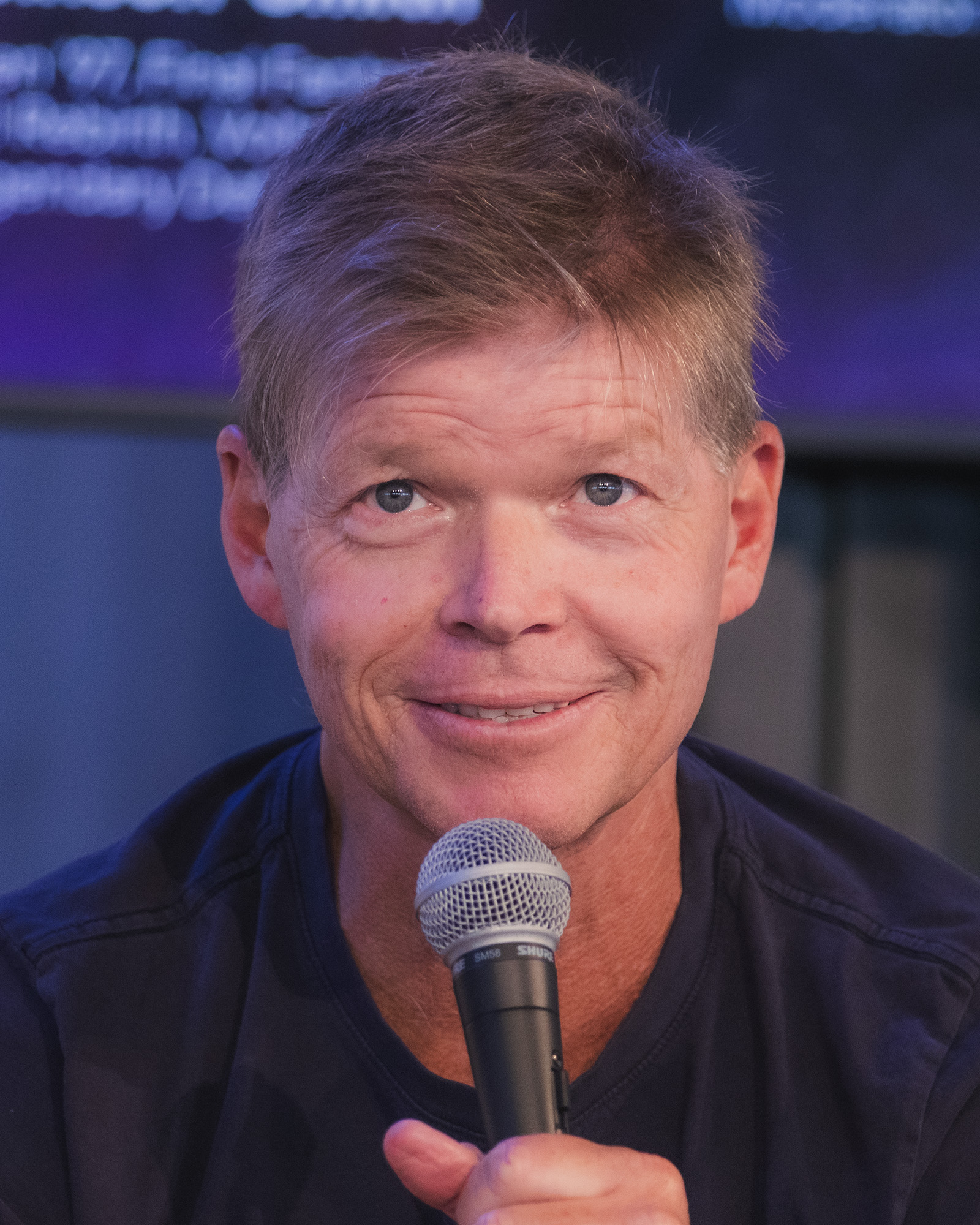
- Liefeld in 2026
- Born: Robert Liefeld; October 3, 1967 (age 59) Fullerton, California, U.S.
- Areas: Writer, Penciller, Inker, Editor, Publisher
- Notable works: Youngblood; X-Force; Deadpool; Avengelyne
- Awards: Inkpot Award (2012)

Robert Liefeld (/ˈlaɪfɛld/; born October 3, 1967) is an American comic book creator. He co-created the character Cable with writer Louise Simonson and the character Deadpool with writer Fabian Nicieza. In the early 1990s, Liefeld gained popularity due to his work on Marvel Comics' The New Mutants and later X-Force. In 1992, he and several other popular Marvel illustrators left the company to found Image Comics, which started a wave of comic books owned by their creators rather than by publishers. The first book published by Image Comics was Liefeld's Youngblood #1.

Liefeld has been called one of the most controversial figures in the comic industry for his drawing skills, business practices, and controversial comments.

In October 2025, Liefeld said that he had perhaps five years left before his retirement, and that the Youngblood series he was writing and drawing for a debut that November would likely be his last comics work, citing his age and his eyesight.

== Early life ==
Rob Liefeld was born on October 3, 1967, in Fullerton, California, the younger child of a Baptist minister and a part-time secretary. He and his sister, seven years his senior, grew up in Anaheim, California.

Liefeld's love of comics began as a child, which led early on to his decision to be a professional artist, a practice that began with his tracing artwork from comic books. As a high school student, he took basic fundamental art courses, and attended comic book conventions at the nearby Disneyland Hotel, where he met creators such as George Pérez, John Romita Jr., Jim Shooter, Bob Layton, Mike Zeck, and Marv Wolfman. Liefeld cites Pérez, along with John Byrne and Frank Miller, as major influences. He has also noted how the influence of Arthur Adams is visible in his art.

== Career ==
=== Early career ===
After graduating from high school, Liefeld took life drawing classes at a local junior college, working odd jobs for about a year, including as a pizza delivery man and construction worker, while practicing his artwork, samples of which he sent to small comics publishers, as he was too intimidated to send them to the "Big Two" companies of Marvel Comics and DC Comics.

Among Liefeld's earliest published work was a pinup of his creation, Youngblood, in Megaton Comics Explosion #1 (June 1987).

Among the editors he sent art samples around 1985 to Gary Carlson of Megaton Comics. Carlson was working on Megaton #4, and was looking for replacements for artists who had moved on to bigger projects. Liefeld's submission packet consisted mostly of pinups of DC Comics characters like the Teen Titans and Legion of Super Heroes, as well as some sketches of Megaton characters. Although Carlson thought Liefeld's depictions of his characters was not sufficiently accurate, and exhibited what Carlson characterized as "some goofy anatomy", he found Liefeld's storytelling to be clear, and his rendering style evocative of the influence of artist George Pérez. Although Carlson liked Liefeld's work overall, he felt the young artist was not ready for professional work. Weeks later he received another set of samples that were an improvement, and later still, a four-page Berserker story (not to be confused with the Marvel or Top Cow characters of the same name), along with pinups of the Megaton characters Ultragirl and Ultraman. Carlson used one of the pinups as the inside front cover to Megaton #5, and Liefeld's Ultragirl pinup in the company's Who's Who–type reference book Megaton Explosion #1 (June 1987). The book also featured an entry for Liefeld's own creation, a team of superheroes called Youngblood, the very first appearance of that team in print.

Carlson and his colleague Chris Ecker later met with the teenaged Liefeld, who at that point had not yet obtained his driver's license, at the Ramada O'Hare Hotel, which was then the location of the Chicago ComiCon. Impressed with the artist's enthusiasm and the new art samples he showed them, Carlson gave Liefeld a test script in order to judge his ability to draw a page-to-page comics story. Although Carlson was impressed with Liefeld's layouts, the story was eventually drawn by Gary Thomas by the time it saw print in Megaton #7. Two months later Liefeld drew the team in an advertisement in Megaton #8 (August 1987), which indicated that it would next appear in Megaton Special #1, by Liefeld and writer Hank Kanalz, with a cover by artist Jerry Ordway. However, Megaton Comics went out of business before that issue could be printed.

=== Success with DC Comics and Marvel Comics ===
Learning from a friend that there was going to be a large number of editors in attendance at a comic book convention in San Francisco, Liefeld and his friend drove several hours to that city, where they stayed with his aunt and uncle. At the convention, he showed editors his samples and offered a package, which consisted of 10 pages of sequential art featuring his own characters. Editor Dick Giordano, to whom Liefeld showed his samples at the DC booth, requested that Liefeld send him more samples. Although Liefeld was apprehensive about approaching the Marvel booth, he did so at his friend's urging, and as a result, editor Mark Gruenwald offered Liefeld a job illustrating an eight-page Avengers backup story featuring the Black Panther, much to the 19-year-old artist's surprise. Though the published story was ultimately illustrated by another artist, Liefeld was later given character design work by the publisher. His first published story was a DC Comics Bonus Book insert in Warlord #131 (September 1988). Editor Robert Greenberger recalled that Liefeld "was discovered by my office-mate, Jonathan Peterson, who was scrambling to find something for him to do. I had the Warlord Bonus Book slot coming up, so to keep Rob from finding work at our rival, I tapped him for that." Next came the five-issue miniseries Hawk and Dove for DC Comics, the first issue of which was published with an October 1988 cover date. It was this work that first garnered Liefeld visibility among readers of mainstream comics. That same year, Liefeld drew Secret Origins #28.

Liefeld's layouts for Hawk and Dove #5, which took place in a chaos dimension, were oriented sideways so that a reader would have to turn the comic book at a right angle to read them. Because this was done without prior editorial approval, editor Mike Carlin cut and pasted the panels into the proper order, and Karl Kesel lightboxed them onto DC comics paper to ink them. The letters column of Hawk and Dove #5 mentions that Liefeld "showed something new to an editor who thought he'd seen everything." Liefeld explained this was how the dimension had been portrayed the only other time it had been shown. Kesel disputed this, stating that this was the first time that dimension had been shown, as he and Barbara Kesel created for that very story, but a 2007 article in Comic Book Resources quoted artist Erik Larsen as saying that he depicted the Chaos Dimension in that matter in Doom Patrol #14, which had been published three months prior, and that Liefeld was adhering to that established look of the location.

Shortly thereafter, Liefeld began doing work for Marvel Comics as well, his first assignment for them being The Amazing Spider-Man Annual #23. In 1989, Liefeld became the penciller for the Marvel series The New Mutants, starting with issue #86. He is generally credited for turning this lowest-selling title of the X-Men franchise into a financial success, which underlined the increased popularity and clout that his stint on the title had earned him.

With The New Mutants #98, Liefeld assumed full creative control over the series, penciling, inking and plotting, with Fabian Nicieza writing dialogue. The New Mutants series ended with issue 100, and was replaced with a revamped version of the team called X-Force, whose 1991 debut issue sold four million copies, setting an industry-wide record later broken by Chris Claremont and Jim Lee's X-Men (vol. 2) #1. The sales numbers were propelled by 1990s direct market sales strategies: five variant edition trading cards were polybagged with X-Force #1 to encourage sales of multiple copies to single collectors, while X-Men #1 was sold with five variant covers. As of 2013, X-Force #1 remains the second highest-selling comic book in history.

In mid-1990, Levi's began producing a series of TV commercials directed by Spike Lee for their 501 button fly jeans, which included an onscreen 800 number that viewers who worked in unique jobs could call in order to appear in the company's commercials. After calling the number and leaving a message describing himself and his career, Liefeld appeared in one of the commercials, in which Lee interviews Liefeld about his career and his creation, X-Force.

Liefeld was subsequently interviewed by Stan Lee in the second episode of the 1991 documentary series The Comic Book Greats, in which he discussed how he broke into the industry, demonstrated his drawing technique, and talked about his Levi's commercial.

=== Leaving Marvel Comics, co-founding Image Comics ===
Liefeld's relationship with Marvel began to break down in 1991 when he announced plans in a black-and-white advertisement in the Comics Buyer's Guide to publish an original title with competitor Malibu Comics. The exact title is unknown, but according to journalist Michael Dean, it was something to the effect of The X-Cutioners, a title whose similarity to Marvel's X-Men family of titles evoked the ire of Marvel editor Bob Harras, who threatened to fire Liefeld if he used that title.

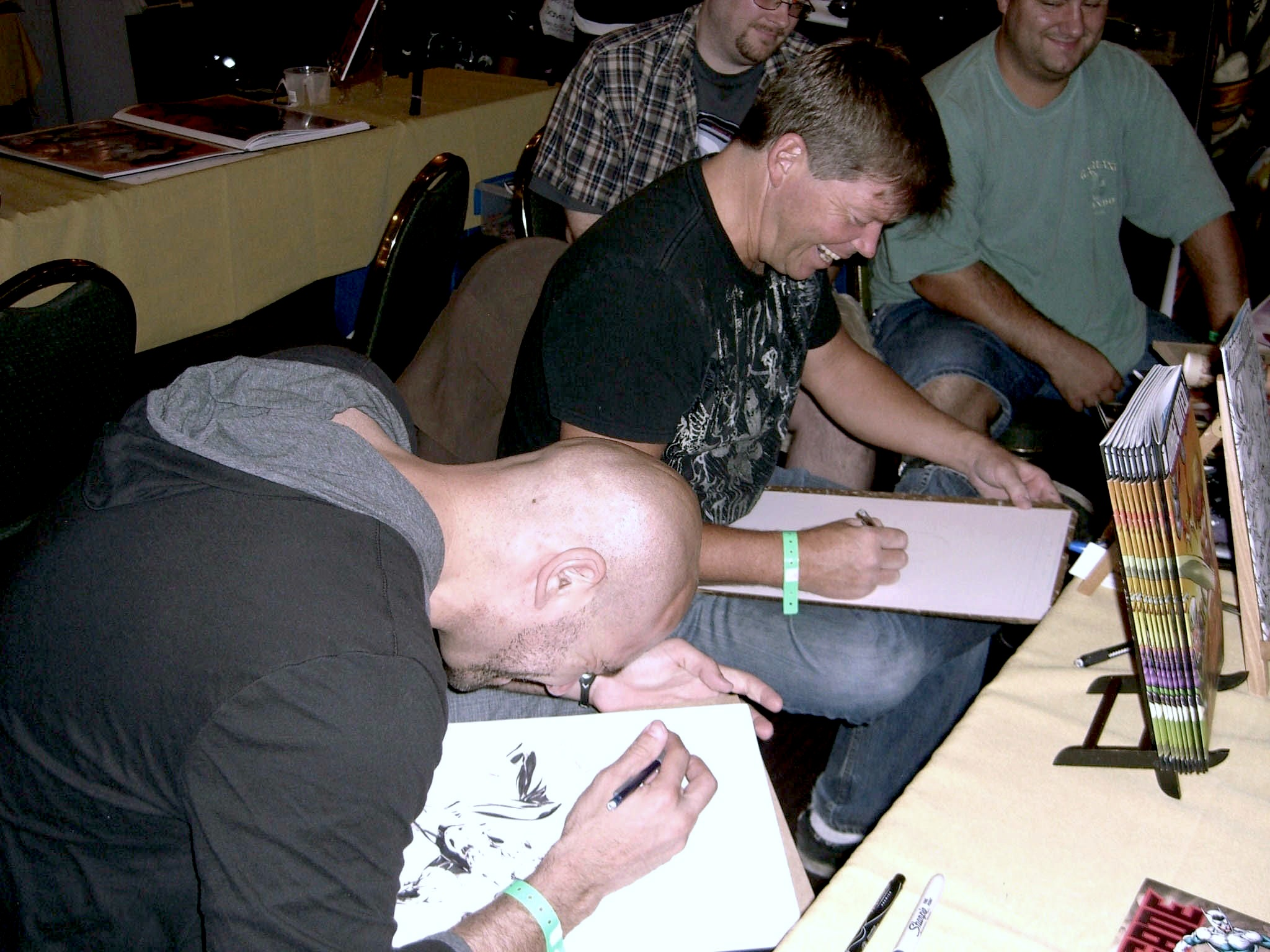
Liefeld and Marat Mychaels share a laugh as they sketch at the Big Apple Convention in Manhattan, October 2, 2010.

Liefeld and several other popular young artists including Jim Lee, Todd McFarlane, Erik Larsen, Whilce Portacio, Jim Valentino, and Marc Silvestri, left Marvel in 1992 to form Image Comics. Each co-founder formed his own studio under the Image banner, such as Liefeld's Extreme Studios. The debut issue of Liefeld's superhero team series Youngblood, which is partially a derivative of a 1991 Teen Titans series Liefeld had proposed to DC Comics, was the first comic Image published. He appeared on an episode of The Dennis Miller Show to promote the book.

The series' first issue was poorly received by both fans and critics for the unclear storytelling effected not only by Liefeld's art, but by the book's flip format, which some readers found confusing, as well as Liefeld's poor anatomy; incorrect perspective; non-existent backgrounds; poor dialogue and the late shipping of the book, a problem that continued with subsequent issues. In an interview in Hero Illustrated #4 (October 1993), Liefeld conceded disappointment with the first four issues of Youngblood, calling the first issue a "disaster". Liefeld explained that production problems, as well as sub-par scripting by his friend and collaborator Hank Kanalz, whose employment Liefeld later terminated, resulted in work that was lower in quality than that which Liefeld produced when Fabian Nicieza scripted his plots on X-Force, and that reprints of those four issues would be re-scripted. Writer and Comics Buyer's Guide columnist Peter David pointed to Liefeld's scapegoating of Kanalz as an example of Liefeld's failure to take responsibility for his project, and evidence that genuine collaboration with good writers like Louise Simonson and Fabian Nicieza, which some of the Image founders did not appreciate, had previously reflected better on Liefeld's art.

Other titles produced by Liefeld's Extreme Studios during the 1990s included Brigade, Bloodstrike, Glory, Prophet, Supreme, Team Youngblood, Youngblood Strikefile, Troll, New Men and Avengelyne. In January 1993, Variety reported that the 24-year-old Liefeld had signed a deal with Steven Spielberg's Amblin Entertainment to develop a multimedia franchise to produce a feature film called Doom's IV, which would see Liefeld's studio producing a comic book tie-in, and Liefeld himself possibly providing character designs for the film. Doom's IV #1 was released with a July 1994 cover date. The series ran for four issues, plus a ½ issue. The film, however, never went into production.

In 1996, Liefeld's and Lee's studios signed with Marvel to re-envision several of the company's core series, an event called "Heroes Reborn". Liefeld was contracted to write twelve issues of The Avengers, co-written with Jeph Loeb, and was to pencil twelve issues of Captain America. Due to disappointing sales, Marvel terminated the agreement after six issues, and reassigned the two series to Lee's studio, one of the most controversial episodes in Liefeld's career.

=== Departure from Image ===
In June 1996, Marc Silvestri temporarily left Image with his Top Cow imprint over conflicts with Liefeld, with Image Comics executive director Larry Marder saying that Liefeld "was making an increasing number of business decisions that were counterproductive to being a business partner." In early September, Liefeld issued a press release stating he was resigning his position at Image and leaving the group. Nearly simultaneously, the other Image partners issued a press release stating that they had fired Liefeld. His resignation came only minutes before the second meeting that would have forced him out. Liefeld moved all his publishing ventures into a new company, Awesome Comics. This new enterprise, announced in April 1997 as a partnership between Liefeld and Malibu Comics founding partner Scott Mitchell Rosenberg, concentrated its efforts on newer properties.

=== Awesome Comics ===
After leaving Captain America, Liefeld attempted to buy the rights to Fighting American, a similarly patriotically themed 1954 character from Captain America's creators, Joe Simon and Jack Kirby. The still-living Simon and Kirby's widow agreed to a figure Liefeld felt was too high, and he created a new similar character, Agent America. Simon threatened to sue, and the parties renegotiated a deal acceptable to all. Marvel Comics then sued Liefeld, who was allowed to use the character but not have him throw his shield weapon, a distinctive trait of Captain America.

Liefeld also hired comic book writer Alan Moore to revive many of Liefeld's creations. Moore wrote a few issues of Youngblood and Glory, but his most lauded work for Liefeld was on Supreme, for which Moore won the 1997 Eisner Award for Best Writer.

Awesome's initial releases included new properties like Kaboom!, created by Jeff Matsuda. Awesome ceased operation in 2000 due to the departure of its primary investor.

=== 2000s work ===
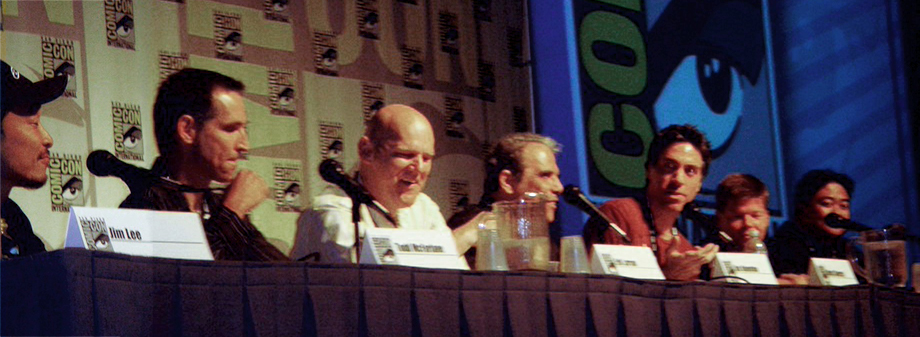
Liefeld (second from right) with the other founders of Image Comics at the 2007 San Diego Comic-Con

In the 2000s, Liefeld returned to his former characters in the X-Men franchise, providing pencils for Cable and X-Force until the early 2000s, when both were canceled.

In 2004, he reunited with Fabian Nicieza for an X-Force limited series and illustrated the early covers for Nicieza's Cable & Deadpool. In that same year, Liefeld formed Arcade Comics and once again announced plans to revive Youngblood. These involved reprinting older material and providing the art for two new series: Youngblood: Bloodsport with Mark Millar and Youngblood: Genesis with Brandon Thomas. Although the former only published one issue, Liefeld expressed hopes to finish the series.

Liefeld and writer Jeph Loeb returned to the Heroes Reborn Universe with Onslaught Reborn, a five-issue limited series that premiered in November 2006. It met with poor reviews.

In 2007, Liefeld and writer Robert Kirkman collaborated on a revival of Killraven. Although five issues of the series were finished, the project was cancelled without any of them being printed.

In July 2007, Rob Liefeld and Youngblood returned to Image Comics after ten years of self-publication. This Youngblood series was written by Joe Casey with art by Derec Donovan and Val Staples, and covers by Liefeld. It debuted in January 2008. Liefeld took over writing and art duties with issue #9, though that would be the series' final issue. To commemorate the event, and the 15th anniversary of Image Comics, the 2007 San Diego Comic-Con was headlined by the Image Founders panel, where all seven of the original Image Comics founders appeared on stage together.

=== 2010s work ===
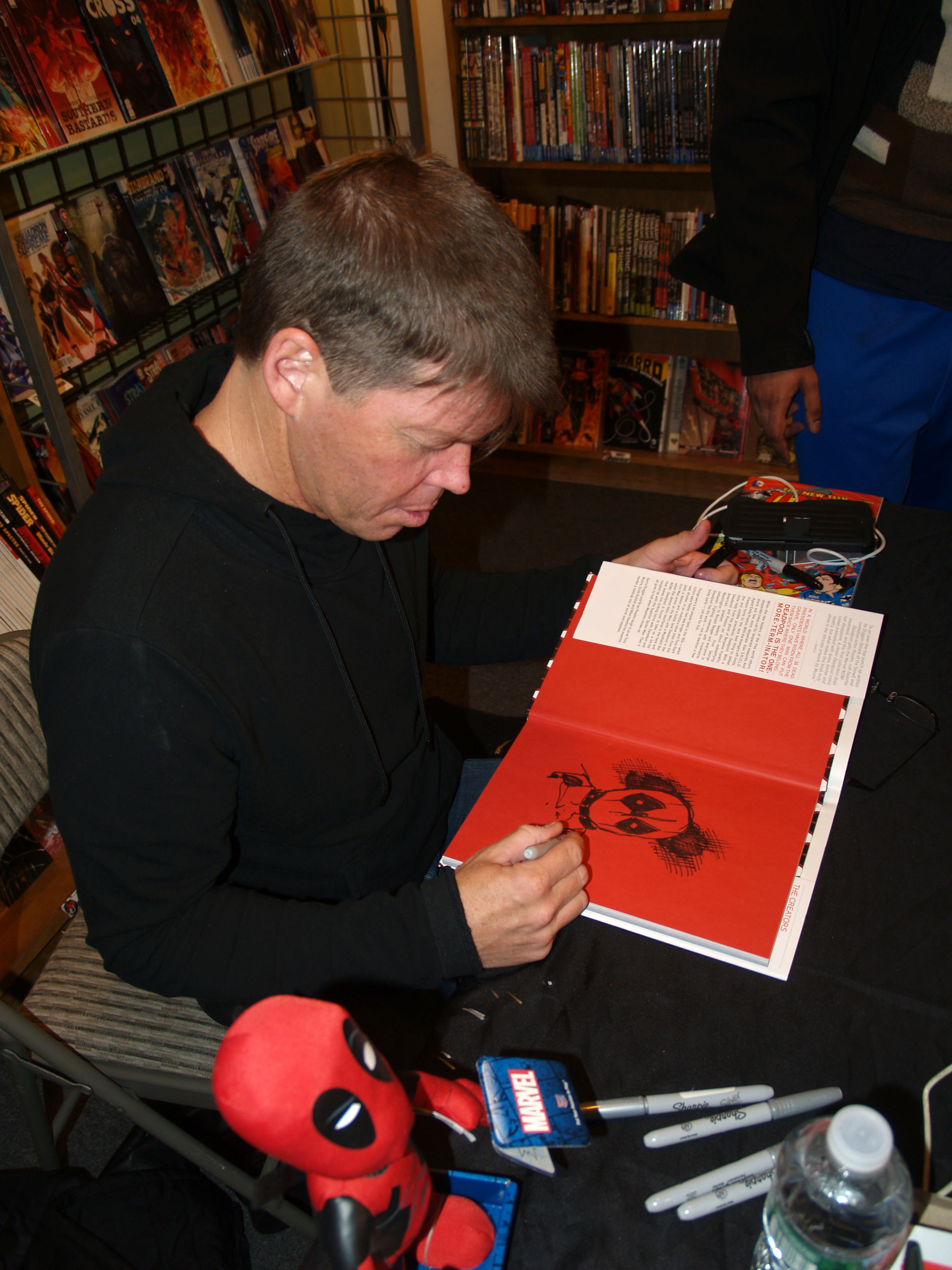
Liefeld sketching Deadpool in a copy of the Deadpool Volume 1 hardcover three days before the release of the 2016 Deadpool film. To his right is a figurine of the character.

2010 saw Liefeld return to the Deadpool character, first by penciling issue #1 of the Prelude to Deadpool Corps series, the issue focusing on Lady Deadpool. Liefeld became the regular artist on Deadpool Corps, providing interior art for the first nine issues.

In March 2011, Liefeld was announced as the artist on The Infinite, a mini-series written by Robert Kirkman. In January 2012, this project was canceled by Liefeld after Kirkman's studio, Skybound, disagreed on the work of a new inker Liefeld hired to draw 14 of the pages in issue #5, which Liefeld re-inked as a result.

In June 2011, he was announced as the artist on a new Hawk and Dove series, with writer Sterling Gates, as part of The New 52, DC Comics' relaunch of their entire superhero line, returning Liefeld to the characters that helped establish him in the industry. When that book was canceled as of issue #8, Liefeld was hired to take over three other titles: Grifter, Deathstroke and The Savage Hawkman, plotting all three, while also writing and drawing Deathstroke. Though he indicated in July 2012 that he would stay on the titles for a run that would end in 2013, he abruptly quit DC Comics in late August 2012, announcing that the #0 issues to be published in September would be his last. Though Liefeld characterized his experience on The New 52 as a positive one, he did not disguise his animosity toward editor Brian Smith, with whom his clashes were among his reasons for leaving the company. Other reasons he cited were frequent rewrites of his material, and the overall corporate culture that was more prevalent now that both DC and Marvel were owned by large media conglomerates. Liefeld also referred to Scott Clark's artwork on Grifter as "crap". Liefeld indicated that he would return to focusing on his creator-owned properties at Image, including Bloodstrike, Brigade, as well as other projects yet to be specified. In response to these events, artist Pete Woods defended DC editorial, stating that the restrictions placed on creators was the result of a plan they had for all 52 of their titles that required them to be consistent with one another. Editor Tom Brevoort and writer Gail Simone defended Brian Smith, disputing Liefeld's characterization of him, leading to a heated exchange on Twitter between Liefeld and Brevoort, and eventually head Batman writer Scott Snyder as well.

In 2011–2012 Liefeld returned to his earlier creator-owned characters, with new books written and illustrated by other writers and artists. These included a new Avengelyne ongoing series debut at Image Comics under the creative team of Mark Poulton and Owen Gieni, a Bloodstrike series written by Tim Seeley, a Glory series written by Joe Keatinge and illustrated by Sophie Campbell, and a Prophet series written by Brandon Graham that garnered critical acclaim. He also published revivals of Youngblood with writer John McLaughlin with artist Jon Malin and Supreme by Erik Larsen in 2012.

In August 2012 Liefeld generated controversy by posting a tweet in which he said of his creation, Deadpool, and the creators who worked on the character:

Testament to Deadpool's appeal and durability is that he thrives regardless of being regulated [sic] to D-list talent. Marvel A-list never touches

The comment was met with criticism by industry professionals who pointed to the esteemed creators who had worked on the character that Liefeld was apparently calling "D-list" creators. Among these critics was Rich Johnston of Bleeding Cool, who pointed out that some of these past creators included Joe Kelly, Ed McGuinness, Joe Madureira, Gail Simone, David Lapham and Kyle Baker. Artist Dave Johnson, who had also worked on the character, referenced a video Liefeld posted on the Web a year earlier of him inking a comics page while driving, by saying, "Yes!!! I've been elevated to the 'D list' of talent. Thanks Rob. Now if I can only learn how to ink while driving a car." Then-Marvel Editor-in-Chief Axel Alonso also referenced other creators who had worked on Deadpool, including Gerry Duggan, Brian Posehn, and Tony Moore, saying, "Welcome to the D-list, @GerryDuggan @thebrianposehn @tonymoore! Howdy Doody just put your name on the list." Writer Rick Remender, another veteran of books featuring Deadpool, stated, "Lot of talented people you just called out as D-list. Might be a better way to congratulate yourself?" Liefeld defended his statement in subsequent tweets posted that day, tweeting, "Truth hurts. Did I miss the Brubaker Deadpool arc? The Millar Deadpool arc? The Loeb Deadpool arc. Get over yourself. The flip of my statement is that Marvel doesn't feature their prize talent on Dpool and the character does well-Mostly newbies, hence D-list". Liefeld stated that his point was that "heavy contract players" at Marvel such as Leinil Francis Yu, Steve McNiven, Arthur Adams, and Olivier Coipel did not produce regular monthly books featuring the character. On March 3, Liefeld apologized for his comments, saying, "As a parent I tell my kids it costs nothing to apologise, so here goes: I apologise and am truly sorry to everyone I insulted with my D-list comments. I said it and can't take it back." Liefeld stated that his original complaint was that Marvel tended to rely on new and unproven talent on Deadpool, and not to attack creators such as the then-new team of Posehn, Duggan, and Moore.

Liefeld made a cameo appearance in the 2016 film based on his most famous creation, Deadpool, which was released in February 2016. In an interview that month, Liefeld stated that he was working on the graphic novel Deadpool: Bad Blood, which was set for release later that year. In 2017, it was reported by Deadline that Liefeld was working with Akiva Goldsman and Graham King on a seven-figure movie deal for his Extreme Universe.

In June 2019, Liefeld reacted to the sweeping editorial changes that occurred at DC Comics in the aftermath of a controversial printing error on Batman Damned #1 with a set of two tweets in which he stated, "DC Comics gonna drive off a cliff here real soon ... gotta get my popcorn ... I ain't never seen a company in as much disarray as DC Comics. Thank God they have Batman to act as their Tylenol, Asprin [sic], laughing gas ... 'more Batman will fix it!'" When writer Mark Millar expressed skepticism of this prediction, pointing to DC's strong lineup, Liefeld replied that Millar's assessment was a dated one that had not been true since the 1980s. Liefeld further tweeted, "I understand my DC honesty will cost me a potential opportunity but who cares! C'mon... they should fire everybody in management and refresh. Batman will still be there for the next group ... And Jim Lee could finally draw the X-Men for you again!!! Wins all around!!" Liefeld eventually deleted the initial two tweets, but they nonetheless prompted a series of arguments between Liefeld and users who criticized him for his remarks. This was followed by Liefeld's concession that neither Marvel nor DC were in any danger of shutting down, and his announcement that he was ending his Twitter account, and would be using Instagram.

=== 2020s work, and future retirement ===
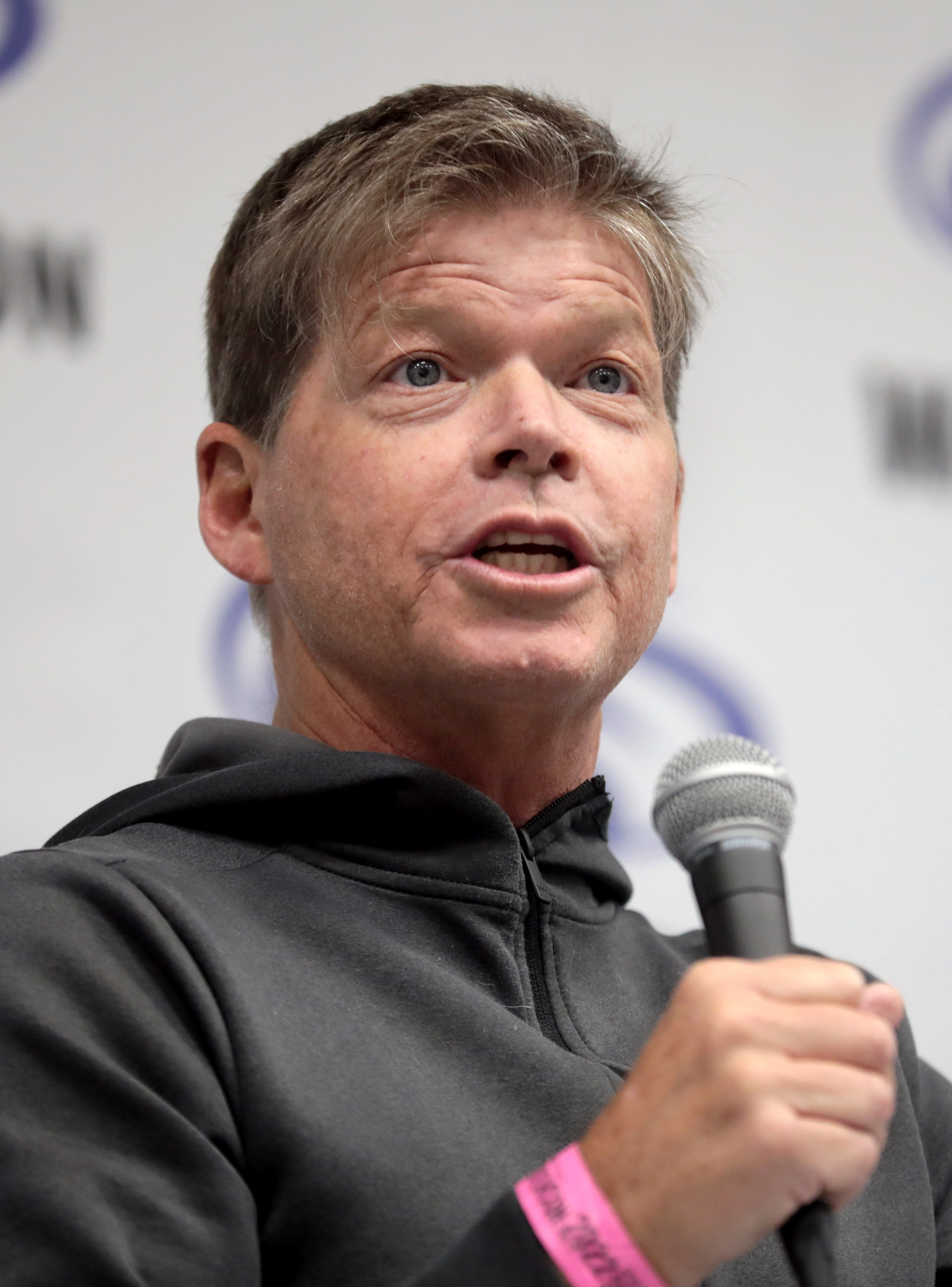
Liefeld at the 2022 WonderCon

In July 2020 IDW Publishing released the first issue of Snake Eyes: Deadgame, a G.I. Joe-related series co-written by Liefeld and Chad Bowers, and penciled by Liefeld, Adelso Corona, and Neil Vyetake. Around that same time, Liefeld began a podcast on iTunes, Spotify and Podbean called Robservations, in which he talks about different topics pertaining to the comics industry.

On October 12, 2023, Liefeld debuted on his Instagram account a proof of concept trailer for Bloodstrike, based on the Image Comics series he had debuted in 1993 as a spinoff of Youngblood. Bloodstrike features a squad of assassins, each of whom is a super-powered operative who died in the line of duty and was resurrected by a secret government program called Project Born Again. The short was directed by Philip J. Silvera, who had met Liefeld during production of the 2016 Deadpool film, on which Silvera had served as a stunt coordinator and second unit director. Over the years, interest had been expressed in the property by individuals such as Akiva Goldsman and Graham King, and production companies such as Netflix, which optioned the development rights, but these eventually expired without any produced results. Liefeld explained in the caption that accompanied the trailer that he released it in the hopes of spurring renewed interest in producing a Bloodstrike film, saying, "When taking a comic book from page to screen there are always hurdles, screenplay, screenwriters, talent that attach and move on. It gets old really fast." Liefeld hoped the film would be directed by Silvera, whom Liefeld said had expressed not only a significant knowledge of comics, but a passion for the characters of Liefeld's Extreme Studios. According to Liefeld, Silvera had also expressed a commitment during the COVID-19 pandemic to make a Bloodstrike film after his commitments at the time were fulfilled, beginning with the trailer.

On February 5, 2024, Liefeld announced on Twitter that after producing one final Deadpool comic to be published later that year, he was retiring from writing or drawing the character, stating, "I am retiring from Deadpool. It's official. Yup, after 33 years of not only introducing Deadpool but chronicling many of his most popular adventures it's time for the Deadpool Daddy to say farewell. One of the fun parts about getting older is you can retire from things, so here I am." Liefeld cited his age as a reason for his decision, explaining, "In case you are wondering, why now? That's easy, I'll be 57 at the end of this and my eyes are still functioning, the work continues to be strong, I want to go out with the best effort I can muster. The hand-eye coordination won't be there forever."

In October 2024, Liefeld announced that the following year he would be launching a new Youngblood series through Image Comics, his first time producing work featuring that team in seven years. The series would be accompanied by the Youngblood Vault Edition, which would feature high-resolution scans of art from the first Youngblood series in 1992, collected in a deluxe oversized hardcover, as well as a facsimile edition of that series' debut issue in time for its 33rd anniversary in April 2025.

In the February 3, 2025 episode of his podcast, Robservations, and a follow-up interview with The Hollywood Reporter, Liefeld stated that he had severed ties with Marvel, following perceived slights at the July premiere in New York of Deadpool & Wolverine. Specifically, Liefeld learned that he and his family were not invited to the afterparty, despite having attended such events in the past, which Liefeld said "was meant to embarrass, diminish, defeat me." He also said that he had been ignored by top Disney officials, including Marvel Studios head Kevin Feige, despite the fact that Feige had been standing near Liefeld. In addition, Liefeld said he posed for professional photos with members of the film's production, but later was told by his publicist that those photos had been deleted. He perceived the photos to have been taken as a courtesy only, without any intention of being published, though The Hollywood Reporter's Aaron Couch said that other photos of Liefeld and his family were used in Disney's Getty press portal from the event. Liefeld said that his ire with the company began in early 2023, when he learned that it made the controversial decision to change the credits on Wolverine by giving co-creator status to editor Roy Thomas, which upset Christina Valada, the widow of Wolverine co-creator Len Wein, with whom Liefeld is close friends. Liefeld also made a July 2023 request for special credit on Deadpool & Wolverine, akin to the prominent credit DC Comics gives Jerry Siegel and Joe Shuster on its Superman publications, and inquired about other possible promotional opportunities, but this too was rebuffed. Liefeld believed that the negative reaction Marvel had to his request is what motivated his treatment at the premiere.

In March 2025, Liefeld revealed that he would be selling his revived Youngblood series directly to readers on the Whatnot livestreaming platform, where he was one of the most active and popular comics creators, having sold 18,000 comics, prints, and other products on that platform. Liefeld explained that he made this decision due to what he said were poor orders from comic shops for his recent Marvel work and variant covers, complaining that stores were not ordering his books in abundance, and cited reports of some stores not stocking his work at all, with the orders for his variant cover to February 26's Batman: The Long Halloween: The Last Halloween #5 being the last straw. On March 2, he wrote on Facebook, "Livestreaming is the first line of distribution for these comics. Retailers have proven unreliable with distribution of my work. I can't allow their inconsistent practices to dictate terms of my engagement with customers. My customers are left scrambling again and again for copies of my work...When they couldn't even order my Batman cover correctly, that sealed it. For months, I go to stores and their shelves are stuffed with unsold product. 15–30 copies of comics that did not move off the shelves and won't unless they are part of a discount sale opportunity. My comics are all gone, my variants like Timeslide are hunted at top prices online. My Deadpool Team-Up's are all gone and now my Batman cover is sold out everywhere. The retail situation is upside down. I'd much rather be the guy with the empty slot due to demand exceeding supply, but all these unsold comics represent a huge misfire on behalf of retailers. Direct to consumer will continue to grow." Liefeld had previously sold direct to fans in 2013, when he ran a Kickstarter campaign to fund a relaunch of his other series, Brigade. That campaign raised twice its $17,500 goal, though as of March 2025, the hardcover edition collecting select Brigade issues had not yet shipped to the 30 people who ordered it, resulting in complaints on social media and the Kickstarter comments section. Liefeld flew to Arizona to personally inspect five special editions of the book, which were printed on with heavy card stock, and limited to approximately 80 issues in total. Each edition would be made available exclusively on Liefeld's website for 24 hours, never to be sold again. Eventually, a standard version of the book will be published by Image Comics.

At the October 2025 New York Comic Con, Liefeld said during a retailer day programming event that the Youngblood series debuting that November, which was written and drawn by himself, would likely be his last comics work, explaining, "Guys, I'm not sure how much longer I'll be doing this. I saw Todd [McFarlane] beat me to it. I saw Todd put up a video lately, a couple weeks back, 'I'm not gonna be doing this for long,' I'm like, 'Damn, he beat me to it!’ I can't say that I'm older than Todd. Todd is — in fact, they're all older. I was the kid. Here's the sad thing, I was the kid in Image Comics, and now I'm 58, old, graying. But this is the way I'm gonna go out...I figure I have five years left doing comic books before the eyes go. I've already I have to upgrade my glasses all the time, and I'm not doing that Lasik shit — I'd be the guy that the laser blinds me so, so that's not going to happen. But I've got five years left. I am committed to doing all of this stuff with Image Comics. Having a blast. I feel that we are giving you some fun comics."

== Reception ==
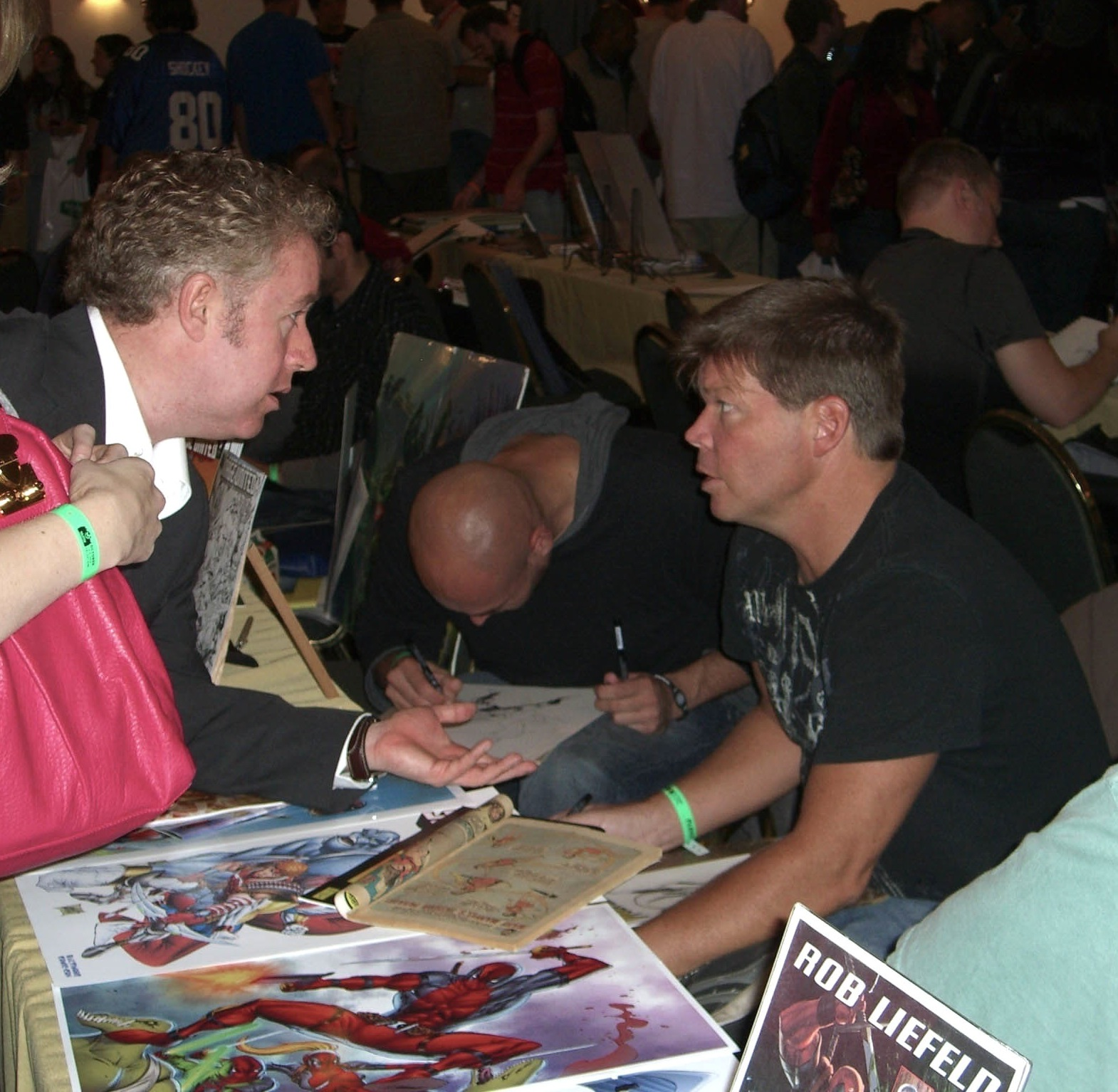
Mark Millar speaking with Liefeld at the Big Apple Convention in Manhattan, October 2, 2010

Liefeld's name has become something of a lightning rod in the industry. In an interview, Brian Michael Bendis described the polarization of opinion on Liefeld: "There is a great dichotomy...There's either some great and generous story about [Liefeld] or you will hear some unbelievable thing like, 'How is he not in jail if he did that?' There is no middle ground."

In interviews, Liefeld has compared himself to other popular figures who experienced meteoric success and acclaim early in their careers but near-pariah status afterwards, such as LeBron James or Britney Spears, who "became vapid in pop music, and perhaps [he] was nothing more than a vapid comic book artist". He seems to credit his success to tapping into the zeitgeist: "I'll be the first to tell you that we [the Image collective] were never the best artists. We were never the best at anything, but just like a song or a band or whatever, we caught on and we toured rigorously."

Liefeld is not without supporters in the industry, including those who defend his art. The A.V. Club says of Liefeld's critics, "Rob Liefeld is the punching bag of choice for many discerning comics fans. But he's also the man who defined what the 1990s looked like in superhero books, so he's crying all the way to the bank. For every detractor who thinks he's the worst thing to happen to comic books since Fredric Wertham, there are a dozen ravenous fanboys ready to snatch up whatever he does next." Writer Jeph Loeb, with whom Liefeld collaborated, and writer Mark Millar are reported to be admirers of his work. Millar in particular wrote the foreword to the 2008 Youngblood collection published by Image Comics, in which he defended that series as an entry in the celebrity superhero subgenre that predated The Authority and X-Statix. Millar also compared critics of Liefeld's layouts and figure work to those who would have criticized Jack Kirby for exhibiting a cartoony style rather than photorealism, and asserted that his own children are avid fans of Liefeld's work in general, and Youngblood in particular. Comics writer Grant Morrison credited the Image creators with "rescuing" American comics, explaining that they responded to children's tastes of the time, and brought comics back to their basic superhero roots following the British Invasion in comics and the popularization of titles typified by Vertigo Comics, a trend of which Morrison had been a contributor. Morrison stated that they are an admirer of Liefeld's work in particular, explaining that while Liefeld's art was regarded as "total crap" in the 1990s, many comic book artists today see it as an avant-garde abstraction of reality that is as bizarre and individual as Vincent van Gogh. In 2012, Rich Johnston of Bleeding Cool said of DC Comics' decision to assign Liefeld the co-scripting and drawing duties on three of their flagging New 52 titles, "Rob does have a habit, of course, of pulling out sales and attention like a rabbit out of a hat."

In 2013, he was named on IGN's list of "The Best Tweeters in Comics" for both his industry insight and his bluntness.

=== Art style ===
Liefeld has been criticized for his drawing skill. In a 1996 interview, writer/illustrator Barry Windsor-Smith criticized the depth of work by the popular artists of the 1990s like Liefeld and Jim Lee, and those whom they had influenced (whom he referred to as "the Liefelds and the Lees"), stating "I don't think it has even crossed their minds that comic books can be a medium for intimate self-expression." Speaking of Liefeld in particular, Windsor-Smith said:

Rob Liefeld has nothing to offer. It's as plain as bacon on your plate. He has nothing to offer. He cannot draw. He can't write. He is a young boy almost, I would expect, whose culture is bubble gum wrappers, Saturday morning cartoons, Marvel Comics; that's his culture ... I see nothing in his work that allows me to even guess that there's any depth involved in that person that might come to the fore given time.

Liefeld's cover to Youngblood #1 (April 1992) illustrating several of the most-criticized elements of his art: extensive cross-hatching, large guns and shoulder pads, and hidden feet

Liefeld has also been criticized for designing characters with an improbable profusion of weapons, accessories, and pouches, a tendency that was subject to parody. For example, during Grant Morrison's run on DC Comics' Doom Patrol in the early 1990s, Morrison collaborated with Keith Giffen, Mike Mignola, and Walt Simonson to produce Doom Force Special #1 (July 1992), which "vicious[ly]" mocked Liefeld's work on X-Force.

Artist Alex Ross drew upon his dislike of the design of Liefeld's creation Cable when designing the character Magog for the 1996 miniseries Kingdom Come. Following writer Mark Waid's instructions that the character's appearance be based on aspects of superhero design trends of the time that they disliked, Ross said of Cable, "That's a character that Mark Waid invented that was really just put to me like come up with the most God awful, Rob Liefeld sort of design that you can. What I was stealing from was—really only two key designs of Rob's—the design of Cable. I hated it. I felt like it looked like they just threw up everything on the character—the scars, the thing going on with his eye, the arm, and what's with all the guns?"

Liefeld has also been criticized for drawing figures with exaggerated muscular anatomy, such as long legs and tiny feet, and "bizarre" anatomy on female characters that some critics felt served to objectify women, with critical articles such as "The 40 Worst Rob Liefeld Drawings", "A Gallery of Rob Liefeld's Anatomical Abominations" and "Worst Rob Liefeld Covers" among the top mentions of Liefeld on Google. One of the most criticized and parodied illustrations was a promotional illustration of Captain America for the 1996 "Heroes Reborn" storyline, which depicted Captain America with "cartoonish proportions", in particular his stomach, arms, and "gaping barrel chest", as Comic Book Resources (CBR) put it. Referred to by Comics Beat as "the most infamous piece of art in comics history", Timothy Donohoo of CBR observed that the artwork "showcases the extreme and many times highly unrealistic anatomy seen in the comics of the era", and came to be viewed as emblematic of Liefeld's artwork as a whole, one that subsequently became an internet meme. Liefeld poked fun at the matter in 2016, tweeting, "Of course I'm #teamcap. I didn't give him those big tits for nuthin..." He revisited the illustration in September 2023 with a New York Comic Con variant cover for Captain America (vol 10) #1, depicting the Sam Wilson incarnation of the character in the same pose. Posting the image on Twitter, Liefeld commented, "Had to get something off my chest." In October 2023, the original 1996 artwork was put up for auction with Heritage Auctions, the second time it had been made so available. On November 17, the piece was auctioned for US$132,000.

These stylistic elements were seen as the impetus for Liefeld's initial success, when such affectations were unusual in comics, and helped lend such characters to successfully merchandised products. Nonetheless, the approach later became a cliché and led to a widespread hostility towards the style. Liefeld agrees for the most part with this estimation of his early work, saying, "In the mid-90s we Mortal Kombat'ed everything. I'm as guilty as anyone and the Cap is the poster boy for that era, easily going over the top in terms of exaggeration," Liefeld's friend, Image Comics partner, and The Walking Dead creator, Robert Kirkman, defends Liefeld, saying, "Every figure that Rob draws has a certain energy to it, a certain excitement. Every character Rob drew had seven knives and six guns and shoulder pads and pouches and belts and straps and ammunition. It was an aesthetic that as a kid absolutely blew me away. I idolized the guy ... Everything he draws is interesting, whether it's accurate or not. A lot of people look at the way Rob draws the human body and they say, 'That's wrong in my eyes.' I would say that these people have no joy in their souls. It's not like Rob doesn't know what a human body looks like, I think Rob looks at a human body and goes: 'That's boring. I can do better.'"

In addition to his depiction of human anatomy, Liefeld's art has also been criticized in more general terms for use of splash pages in lieu of multi-panel pages depicting more story, and poor design and continuity in elements such as clothing, props, and proper proportions between characters and their environments, with industry columnist Peter David responding to Liefeld's 1996 work on the "Heroes Reborn" Captain America by proclaiming Liefeld the "Ed Wood of comics". Kesel relates:

Mike Carlin once said of Rob: "He has it. He just doesn't have it yet." And I couldn't agree more. Rob is one of the most energetic and charming people I've ever met—you can't help but like him—and at the time of [Liefeld's early work on Hawk and Dove] his work showed great potential. But success came far too quickly and easily to him, and he never felt the need to develop that potential. Which is really too bad, because if he did I'm certain he would have left a very different mark on the industry. Not that things worked out that badly for him ...

Liefeld has stated that such criticism has not bothered him, in part because, at the height of his popularity, he had things outside of his work to focus on, such as the death of his father from cancer in 1999. By the 2010s, he was known to reference this perception of his work in a lighthearted manner: Following the April 2012 release of DC Comics' solicitations for that July, which included Liefeld's covers for The Savage Hawkman #11, Deathstroke #11, and Grifter #11—all of which showed characters' feet—Liefeld, who had been criticized for avoiding drawing characters' feet, commented, "The Hipsters don't know what to do when I draw feet. It confuses them." In the 2018 feature film Deadpool 2, the character Domino's luck-based powers are disparaged by Deadpool: "Luck? What coked-out, glass pipe-sucking freakshow comic book artist came up with that little chestnut? Probably a guy who can't draw feet!", a reference acknowledged by Liefeld, who has pointed out that many fan favorite artists used mounds of debris or shadows to avoid drawing feet.

=== Creator credit ===
At the beginning of Liefeld's run on the New Mutants, the heavily muscled, heavily armed cyborg character Cable was created for the team, and became a popular antihero, although there is dispute over Cable's origin, with conflicting accounts of credit given to Liefeld, Bob Harras, and Louise Simonson for aspects of the character's concept and origin. For a time, Marvel credited only Liefeld and Simonson as Cable's creators within the Cable & Deadpool series. He also was credited as the sole creator of Youngblood, when documentation suggests that Liefeld's longtime friend and collaborator Hank Kanalz co-developed that team with him. Liefeld has also contested sharing creator credit with writer Fabian Nicieza for the character Deadpool. In a 2016 New York Times interview, Liefeld said that he did "all the heavy lifting" in writing and drawing the issue in which that character first appeared, while Nicieza wrote its script, saying, "If a janitor scripted New Mutants 98, he'd be the co-creator – that's how it works, buddy. Deadpool does not exist in any way, shape or form without me. I wrote the stories. Like Jim Lee and others, I worked with a scripter who helped facilitate. I chose Fabian, and he got the benefit of the Rob Liefeld lottery ticket. Those are good coattails to ride." These remarks drew criticism from writers Dan Slott, Mark Waid, and Kurt Busiek, and artist Darick Robertson, who felt that Liefeld was diminishing Nicieza's contributions to the character. Busiek in particular referenced Nicieza's work on Deadpool's signature trait, saying, "Because the success of the Merc With A Mouth clearly has nothing to do with the guy who supplied the mouth." Liefeld later said that he hated the New York Times article, calling it "a hit piece".

Liefeld has also been accused of swiping, or copying, art from other artists. Liefeld responded to this accusation by stating that in these instances, which he said were limited to ten, he was offering tribute to the artists of the original pieces in question, rather than plagiarizing, and compared this to the work of filmmaker Brian De Palma, who used the techniques of Alfred Hitchcock. Peter David responded to this rationale by stating that DePalma himself was criticized harshly by film critics for employing Hitchcock's techniques, and that Liefeld, who has identified himself as a "stickler" for credit, did not credit artists whose work he copied, instances of which exceeded the ten upon which Liefeld insisted. David also stated that some of these artists, such as John Byrne and George Pérez, did not react to this practice on Liefeld's part as a "tribute", and expressed displeasure at the degree to which Liefeld relied on their work.

=== Production and business problems ===
Liefeld has also gained a reputation for producing late books, primarily his creator-owned ones, though somewhat less so when doing work-for-hire. Some issues of his series Youngblood shipped as much as nine months late. Liefeld has attributed this to the greater incentive a freelancer feels when doing work-for-hire assignments for a company, as opposed to working on one's self-owned work. Creator Bob Layton related he had to fly to Los Angeles and actually sit on Liefeld's doorstep until Liefeld finished penciling his portion of the Deathmate miniseries, which was an intercompany crossover published by Image Comics and Valiant Comics, and that he had to ink the artwork himself in an Anaheim hotel room. Layton stated, "There I was, with my own company to manage, and I was in California, managing someone else's people." Layton cites Deathmate, and Image's inability to produce its half of that series in a timely manner, as the first disaster that heralded the end of the speculator boom of the 1990s, and the eventual demise of Valiant Comics.

Liefeld has been criticized for not returning to Rick Veitch the original artwork that Veitch had produced for Liefeld's Awesome Comics series, Supreme.

Liefeld compared his conflicts with contemporaries McFarlane and Jim Lee to the intra-band conflicts of the Eagles, reflecting in 2007 that his feud with the Image partners was in the past, saying, "The divorce was ugly, but to me it didn't linger. ... I realized you just need to let it go."

== Selected bibliography ==
=== Artwork ===
- The Amazing Spider-Man Annual #23 (1989)
- X-Factor #40, #50 (cover only), #52 (cover only)
- Uncanny X-Men #245
- New Mutants #85 (cover only), #86–91, #92 (cover only), #93–96, #97 (cover only), #98–100, Annual #5, Annual #6 (cover only)
- X-Force #1–9 (plot & pencils), #10 (plot), #11 (plot & cover), #12–13 (plot)
- Wolverine vol. 2, #154–155
- Marvel Comics Presents #52–53, 85–86
- Marc Spector Moon Knight #19 (cover) (1990)
- Captain America vol. 2 #1–6
- Guardians of the Galaxy #9 (1990) (cover inks)
- Captain American Cold War Omega #1 (2023) (variant cover art)
- Cable #71, 73, 75, 77
- Youngblood and Youngblood: Bloodsport
- Brigade
- Armageddon Now
- Smash
- Re:Gex
- Doom's IV
- Battlestar Galactica #1 (1995) (plotter/cover art)
- Teen Titans 27–28
- X-Force vol. 2, #1–6
- Onslaught Reborn #1–5
- What If vol. 2, #7
- Darker Image #1–2 (1993) (plotter/pencils)
- Deathmate Prologue (1993) (pencils)
- Avengers Vol 2 #1 (1996) (writer/pencils/cover)
- Fantastic Four vol. 7 #7 (2023) (variant cover)
- Deadpool #900
- Deadpool Vol 8 #1 (2022) (cover art)
- Deadpool Bad Blood #1–4 (2022) (plotter/pencils)
- Deadpool Badder Blood #1–5 (2023) (plotter/pencils)
- Deadpool: Seven Slaughters #1 (2023) (story/artwork)
- Prelude to Deadpool Corps #1 (written by Victor Gischler, five-issue limited series, Marvel Comics, May 2010, 120 pages, premiere hardcover, July 2010, ISBN 0-7851-4752-7)
- Deadpool Corps #1–9
- The Infinite #1–6 (August 2011 – January 2012)
- Grifter #9–12, 0 (cover art)
- Hawk and Dove #1–5 (1988)
- Hawk and Dove Annual #1 (1990) (cover art)
- Hawk and Dove #1–8 (2011–2012)
- Deathstroke vol. 2, #9–12, #0 (2012–2013) (artist and cover art)
- The Savage Hawkman #9–12 (cover art)
- Snake Eyes: Deadgame #1–6 (artist and cover art)
- Image United #1–3 (2009–2010)
- Daredevil vol. 7 #12 (2023) (variant cover art)
- Bishop War College #1 (2023) (variant cover art)
- Uncanny Avengers vol. 4 #4 (2023) (variant cover art)
- Wolverine vol. 7 #34 (2023) (variant cover art)
- Deadpool Seven Slaughters (2024) (plotter/penciller)
- Deadpool Team-Up vol. 3 #1-4 (2024)
- Deadpool vol. 9 #1-2 (2024) (variant cover art)
- Wolverine vol. 8 #22 (2026) (variant cover art)

=== Writing ===
- Battlestar Galactica: War of Eden #1—4
- Battlestar Galactica: The Enemy Within #1—3
- Battlestar Galactica: Starbuck #1—3
- Battlestar Galactica: Journey's End #1—4
- Deathstroke vol. 2, #9–12, 0 (writer); 13–14 (plot)
- Grifter #9–12, 0, 13–14 (plot/co-writer)
- Avengers vol. 2 #1–7 (plot)
- Captain America vol. 2 #1–6 (plot)
- New Mutants #98–100
- Marvel Comics Presents #52, 53, 99
- Prophet/Cable #1–2
- The Savage Hawkman #9–12, 0, 13–15 (plot/co-writer)
- Snake Eyes: Deadgame #1–6 (plot/co-writer)
- Wolverine vol. 2, #154–157
- X-Force #1–12
- X-Force: Shatterstar #1–4

Preceded by Steve Skroce	Wolverine writer 2000	Succeeded by Joe Pruett
