= Simon Roy =

Canadian comic book writer and artist

- Born: Victoria, British Columbia
- Area: Cartoonist
- Notable works: Jan's Atomic Heart, Prophet

Simon Roy is a Canadian comic book writer and artist. Born in Victoria, British Columbia, he later moved to Vancouver Island.

His major works include Griz Grobus, Prophet, The Island, First Knife, Habitat, Tiger Lung, and Jan's Atomic Heart. He has worked with publishers such Image Comics, Dark Horse Comics, Extreme Studios and IDW Publishing.

== Bibliography ==
=== Self-published on the web ===
- The Cosmonauts (w/a, 2007)
- Homesick (w/a, 2008)
- Мотобол (w/a, 2008)
- Shipwrecked with Dan the Gorilla (w/a):
  - Originally an unfinished 24-hour webcomic, 2008.
  - Redrawn and published at Study Group Comics, 2012.
- Murder Book (tpb, 184 pages, Dark Horse, 2015, ISBN 1-61655-681-1) includes:
  - "Catching Up" (a, with Ed Brisson, 2010)
  - "Skimming the Till" (a, with Ed Brisson, 2010)
- Группа Крови (Blood Group) (w/a, 2010)
- Man in the 51st Millenium (w/a, 2010)
- Barfight (w/a, for Arthur, 2010)
- Homeward Bound (w/a, for Study Group Comics, 2012)
- 8.30 AM, April 3rd 1996 (w/a, for Study Group Comics, 2012)

=== Image Comics ===
- Prophet (w/a, with Brandon Graham and various artists, Extreme Studios, 2012–2016) collected as:
  - Remission (collects #21-26, tpb, 136 pages, 2012, ISBN 1-60706-611-4)
  - Brothers (collects #27-31 and 33, tpb, 172 pages, 2013, ISBN 1-60706-749-8)
  - Empire (collects #32 and 34-38, tpb, 128 pages, 2014, ISBN 1-60706-858-3)
  - Joining (collects #39-45 and Strikefile #1-2, tpb, 168 pages, 2015, ISBN 1-63215-254-1)
  - Earth War (collects Earth War #1-6, tpb, 168 pages, 2016, ISBN 1-63215-836-1)
- Jan's Atomic Heart and Other Stories (104 pages, 2014, ISBN 1-60706-936-9).
- The Field #1-4 (a, with Ed Brisson, 2014) collected as The Field (tpb, 104 pages, 2014, ISBN 1-63215-106-5)
- Island #2, 5, 8: "Habitat" (w/a, anthology, 2015–2016) collected as Habitat (tpb, 96 pages, 2016, ISBN 1-63215-885-X)
- Thought Bubble Anthology #5: "Songs" (a, with Brandon Graham, 2017)
- Protector (Later renamed to First Knife) (w, with Daniel Bensen and Artyom Trakhanov and Jason Wordie, 136 pages, 2020, ISBN 978-1-5343-1642-3)
- Grip of the Kombinat (with Damon Gentry, 196 pages, 2022, ISBN 978-1-5343-2301-8)
- Griz Grobus (200 pages, 2024, ISBN 978-1-5343-9786-6)
- A Star Called the Sun (184 pages, 2026, ISBN 978-1-5343-3324-6)

=== Other publishers ===
- Jan's Atomic Heart (w/a):
  - Originally a graphic novel from New Reliable Press (48 pages, 2009, ISBN 0-9738079-5-4).
  - Reprinted by Image in Jan's Atomic Heart and Other Stories (104 pages, 2014, ISBN 1-60706-936-9).
- Heavy Metal vol. 34 #9: "Good Business" (w/a, anthology, Metal Mammoth, 2011)
- Dark Horse:
  - Dark Horse Presents: "Tiger Lung" (w/a, with Jason Wordie, anthology):
    - "Beneath the Ice" (in vol. 2 #21-23, 2013) collected as Tiger Lung (hc, 88 pages, 2014, ISBN 1-61655-543-2)
    - "The Guide" (in vol. 3 #6, 2014)
    - Originally an unfinished story called Dead Lands (2010).
  - Halo: Tales from the Slipspace: "Hunting Party" (a, with J. D. Goff, anthology graphic novel, 128 pages, 2016, ISBN 1-5067-0072-1)
- Think of a City page 43 (w/a, Internet art project, 2015)
- Captain Canuck vol. 2 #5: "Double Star Crossed, Part One" (a, with Ed Brisson, co-feature, Chapterhouse, 2015)
- 2000 AD #2053: "Judge Dredd: Adaptive Optics" (a, with Arthur Wyatt, anthology, Rebellion, 2017)
- Star Trek: Waypoint #5: "Come Away, Child" (w/a, co-feature, IDW Publishing, 2017)
- Cayrels Ring #1, 3 (a, with Shannon W. Lentz and various artists, Kickstarter, 136 pages, 2018–2019, ISBN 978-1-949518-06-1 )

=== Covers only ===
- Godzilla: The Half-Century War #5 (IDW Publishing, 2013, retailer incentive cover)
- Sabertooth Swordsman #5 (Dark Horse, 2013, cover A)
- Panels for Primates #1 (Monkeybrain, 2013)
- Undertow #1 (Image, 2014, variant cover B, ISBN 978-1-63215-013-4)
- Spread #1 (Image, 2014, Third Eye Comics exclusive cover)
- Cluster #1 (Boom! Studios, 2015, cover B, Larry's Comics exclusive cover)
- Ancient Noise #1 (Kickstarter, 2016)
- Robotech #8 (Titan Comics, 2018, cover A)
- The Spider King #3 (IDW Publishing, 2018, cover B)
- The Season of the Snake #1 (Titan Comics, 2018, cover A, ISBN 978-1-78586-939-6)
- The Gravediggers Union #8 (Image, 2018, variant cover B)

== Interviews ==
- Vasseur, Richard (July 6, 2009). "Simon Roy: Creator, Writer & Artist of Jan's Atomic Heart". Jazma Online.
- de Valming, Kevin (October 14, 2009). "Profiling Simon Roy of Jan's Atomic Heart". The Fabler. Archived from the original on June 26, 2010.
- Harper, David (August 28, 2012). "Artist August: Simon Roy". Multiversity Comics.
- Holder, Lyndsey (December 2, 2012). "Interview: Simon Roy". Innsmouth Free Press.
- Ingram, Ryan (February 26, 2013). "Prophet, Zoology & Ice Age Mysticism with Simon Roy". Comic Book Resources. Archived from the original on March 18, 2013.
- Meylikhov, Matthew (February 18, 2014). "Simon Roy Uncovers Jan's Atomic Heart and Other Stories". Multiversity Comics.
- Ingram, Ryan (March 19, 2014). "Simon Roy's Jan's Atomic Heart Explodes Back to Life". Comic Book Resources. Archived from the original on March 21, 2014.
- Simon, Phillip (December 3, 2014). "Interview with Tiger Lung Writer Simon Roy". Dark Horse.
- Ingram, Ryan (March 25, 2015). "Digging Deep into the Ice Age Shamanism of Tiger Lung with Simon Roy". The Snipe.
