= 2011 in comics =

Notable events of 2011 in comics, including any relevant comics-related events, deaths of notable comics-related people, conventions and first issues by title.

== Events ==
=== January ===
- January 4: Axel Alonso is named editor-in-chief of Marvel Comics, replacing Joe Quesada.
- January 11: Dutch cartoonist Peter van Straaten wins his fourth Inktspotprijs (edition 2010) for Best Political Cartoon.
- January 13: Tunisian cartoonist Nadia Khiari creates Willis the Cat, who will rise to become a symbol of opposition during the Arab Spring in Tunisia.
- January 20–21: DC Comics and Archie Comics both drop the Comics Code Authority seal, DC Comics however used a rating system, and Archie Comics did not ever use a rating system.
- January 29: Belgian comic writer Jean Van Hamme is named Commandeur des Arts et des Lettres.

=== February ===
- February 24: Scripps Company strikes a distribution deal with Universal Uclick (now known as Andrews McMeel Syndication) for syndication of United Media's 150 comic strip and news features, which becomes effective on June 1.
- In Melbourne, Australia, Mitch Davies and Troy Varker found the comics store All Star Comics Melbourne.

=== March ===
- March 12–13: During the Stripdagen in Gorinchem Minck Oosterveer receives the Stripschapprijs. He will tragically die in a motor accident in September. The magazine Stripschrift wins the P. Hans Frankfurtherprijs. Eiso Toonder, son of Marten Toonder, receives the Bulletje en Boonestaak Schaal.
- Catawiki, an online compendium of collector's catalogues, becomes available in English.

=== April ===
- April 29: Martin Lodewijk is knighted in the Order of Orange-Nassau.
- Mark Millar, Leinil Francis Yu, Frank Quitely, Dave Gibbons, John Romita Jr., Paul Cornell, Andy Diggle, Jock, Duncan Fegredo, Sean Phillips and over fifty other comic book creators collaborate at the inaugural Kapow Comic Convention and enter the Guinness World Records twice for creating the fastest comic book ever produced and the biggest number of creators working on a single comic, namely Superior. The Superior World Record Special was written, penciled, inked and lettered in less than 12 hours and sold as a limited 10,000 copy book with all proceeds from its sales going to Yorkhill Sick Children's Hospital in Scotland.

=== June ===
- June 4:
  - Belgian comic artist Marc Sleen is declared an honorary citizen of Hoeilaart.
  - The comic character Kari Lente receives a statue in Brasschaat, Belgium.

=== July ===
- July 19: Stage show Batman Live premiers in Manchester Evening News Arena

=== August ===
- August 27: Signe Wilkinson's Family Tree ends after three and a half years.
- As part of their The New 52 publishing scheme, DC Comics cancels all their ongoing titles.

=== September ===
- September 9: Dutch comic artist Peter Pontiac receives the Marten Toonderprijs award.
- During the month, DC Comics releases 52 brand-new titles as part of their The New 52 publishing scheme.

=== October ===
- October 25: U.S. cartoonist Dave Simpson is caught with plagiarism and instantly announces his retirement from the cartooning industry.

=== November ===
- November 8: Israeli-French cartoonist Michel Kichka is knighted as Chevalier dans l'Ordre des Arts et des Lettres.

=== Specific date unknown ===
- Greg Tessier and Amandine launch their comics series Mistinguette.
- Jeroom creates his gag comic Het Knuffelbos.

== Deaths ==
=== January ===
- January 6: Jacques van der Smissen, Dutch painter, graphic artist and comics artist (made gag comics for Aloha magazine), dies at age 68.
- January 18: Marcel Marlier, Belgian illustrator (Martine), dies at age 80.
- January 28: Gaspare de Fiore, Italian comics artist (assistant of Sergio Rosi), dies at age 84.
- January 29: Orhan Halil Tolon, Turkish comics artist, illustrator and caricaturist (Zipzip Ali'nin Oyunlari, Eciş & Bücüş, Lük-Lük, Çetin Kaptan, Tektel Amca), dies at age 88 or 89.

=== February ===
- February 4: Peter Csihas, Swedish comic artist (Fantasier, comic strip versions of De Hemligas Ö, Peter och Janne), dies at age 65.
- February 6: Ahmed Bouanani, Moroccan film director and comics artist (made a newspaper comic for the paper Al Maghrib), dies at age 72.
- February 9: Félix Molinari, French comic artist (Garry, Super Boy, Tora, Les Héritiers d'Orphée, Les Tigres Volantes, Les Survivants de l'Atlantique, Le Dernier Kamikaze), dies at age 80.
- February 21: Dwayne McDuffie, American comic book writer (Milestone Media, Marvel Comics, DC Comics), dies at age 49 of complications from emergency heart surgery.
- February 24: Anant Pai, Indian comics writer and artist (Indrajal Comics, Amar Chitra Katha, Tinkle), dies at age 73.
- February 25: Ioanna Salajan, American teacher, painter and comic artist (Zen Comics), dies at an unknown age.

=== March ===
- March 4: Eduardo Ferro, Argentine comics artist (Don Pitazo, Asserín y Pan Rallado, Langostino, Bólido, Tara Service, Pandora, Pampa Barbara, Chapaleo, continued El Fantasma Benito), dies at age 93.
- March 10: Bill Blackbeard, American comics scholar, historian and collector (wrote comics reviews and articles for The Riverside Quarterly and Hogan's Alley, while also contributing to various comics reprint collections), dies at age 84.
- March 21:
  - Juan Carlos Eguillor, Spanish comic artist (Mari Aguirre, Krisket eta Popolo), dies at age 63.
  - Gustav Krum, Czech painter, illustrator and comics artist (comics adaptations of literary novels), dies at age 86.

=== April ===
- April 6: Gerard van Straaten, Dutch illustrator and comics artist (Marten Toonder Studio's, several realistic comics for various Dutch newspapers and magazines), dies at age 86.

=== May ===
- May 8: Carlos Trillo, Argentine comics writer (Cybersix, El Negro Blanco, El Loco Chavez), dies at age 68.
- May 13: Alain Voss, Brazilian-French comics artist (Parodies de Al Voss, Anarcity), dies from a stroke at age 65.
- May 19: Jeffrey Catherine Jones, American comics artist and painter (Idyl, I'm Age), dies at age 67.
- May 21:
  - Paul Gillon, French comics artist (Les Naufragés du Temps, La Survivante)
  - Bill Rechin, American comics artist (Out of Bounds , Crock), dies at age 80.
- May 22: Francine Vandenbosch, French comics writer (Les Labourdet) and colorist, wife of Jean Graton, dies at age 79.

=== June ===
- June 6: Mohamed Al-Zawawi, Libyan cartoonist and comics artist (The Young Hero, With One Blow I Killed Seven), dies at age 74 or 75.
- June 18: Lew Schwartz, American comics artist (worked on Batman, co-creator of Deadshot), dies at age 84.
- June 23: Gene Colan, American comics artist (Marvel Comics, Howard the Duck, The Tomb of Dracula, co-creator of Falcon and Blade), died at age 84.
- June 27: Thierry Martens, Belgian novelist, journalist and publisher (chief editor of Spirou 1969–1978), dies at age 69.

=== July ===
- July 5: George Martin, British comic artist (Bunion, Captain Bungle, Greedy Pig, Desperate Dawg, The Hillys and the Billys), dies at age 82 or 83.
- July 9: Gideon Brugman, Dutch comics artist (Zonk en Stronk, Professor Ambrosius), dies at age 68.
- July 12: Leo Leonhard, German comics artist (Rüssel in Komikland), dies at age 72.
- July 19: Henri Taymans, aka Timme, Belgian comics artist (De Avonturen van Wim Rits en Jan Blok: De Bende van de Hertog), dies at age 76.

=== August ===
- August 6: John Adkins Richardson, American comic artist (Maxor, Fever Dreams, The Hunting of the Snark) and author of The Complete Book of Cartooning, dies at age 81.
- August 12: Francisco Solano Lopéz, Argentine comics artist (El Eternauta, Janus Stark), dies at age 82.
- August 15: Pap Dean, American cartoonist and comics artist, dies at age 95.
- August 18: Jean Tabary, French comics artist (Iznogoud, Totoche, Corinne et Jeannot), died at age 81.
- August 22: Vicco von Bülow, aka Loriot or Pirol, German comedian, comics artist, cartoonist, film director, writer and actor (Wahre Geschichten erlogen von Loriot, Reinhold das Nashorn), dies at age 87.

=== September ===
- September 4: Dave Hoover, American comics artist and animator (Wanderers, Starman, Captain America), dies at age 56.
- September 6: George Kuchar, American underground film director and comics artist made a comics biography about H.P. Lovecraft, dies at age 69.
- September 9: Daniel Hulet, Belgian comics artist (Charabia, Léo Gwenn, Pharaon), dies at age 66.
- September 11: Michel-Paul Giroud, French comic artist (La Bande des Loups, Yankee, Toy, worked on Arthur le fantôme justicier, continued Cap'tain Vir de Bor and La Pension Radicelle), dies at age 78.
- September 14: Gilles Chaillet, French comics artist (Vasco), dies at age 65.
- September 15: Gilbert Schats, Belgian comic artist (Koning Bubu AKA Le Roi Bubu), dies at age 66.
- September 16: Tom Wilson, American comics artist (Ziggy), dies at age 80.
- September 17: Minck Oosterveer, Dutch comics artist (Nicky Saxx, Zodiak, Jack Pott, Claudia Brücken, worked on Storm), dies in a motor accident at age 50.
- September 18: Jack Adler, American cover artist and colourist (DC Comics), dies at age 94.
- September 21: Júlio Resende, Portuguese painter and comics artist (O Fagundes Arrepiado, O Senhor Freitas and O Feli-Feli), dies at age 93.
- September 25: Dick Briel, Dutch comics artist (Professor Palmboom), dies at age 60.
- September 26: Sergio Bonelli, Italian comics writer (Zagor, Mister No), dies at age 78.
- September 29: Albert Weinberg, Belgian comics artist (Dan Cooper), dies at age 91.

=== October ===
- October 21: Ahmed Hijazy, Egyptian comic artist (Thnablet El Sibian), dies at age 74 or 75.
- October 31: Mick Anglo, British comics artist (Marvelman), dies at age 95.

=== November ===
- November 7: Jorge Kato, Brazilian comics (Disney comics), dies at age 75.
- November 8: Bil Keane, American comics artist (The Family Circus, Channel Chuckles), dies at age 89.
- November 9: Terry Willers, British-Irish comics artist (Toonder Studios), dies at age 76.
- November 30: Carlos A. Killian, Argentine comics artist and caricaturist (Perloto), dies at age 64.

=== December ===
- December 2: Bruno Bianchi, French animator and comics artist (Inspector Gadget), dies at age 45 or 46 from cancer.
- December 7: Jerry Robinson, American comics artist (Batman, creator of the Joker and Robin), dies at age 89.
- December 13:
  - Maria Pascual Alberich, Spanish illustrator and comics artist (Rosas Blancas, Sissi), dies at age 78.
  - Carlo Peroni, Italian comics artist (Gianconiglio), dies at age 82.
- December 14: Joe Simon, American comics artist (co-creator with Jack Kirby of Captain America), dies at age 98 after a brief illness.
- December 15: Eduardo Barreto, Uruguayan comics artist (Batman, Judge Parker, The New Teen Titans, Superman), dies at age 57, apparently from meningitis
- December 21: Eric Resetar, New Zealand comics artist (Crash Carson of the Future, Crash O'Kane), dies at age 83.
- December 26:
  - Jo Dustin, Belgian painter, art critic and editorial cartoonist (published in Le Drapeau Rouge), dies at age 75.
  - Ola Ericson, Swedish comics artist (Tvillingdetektiverna, Broknäsflickorna), dies at age 91.
- December 30: Ronald Searle, British illustrator, cartoonist and comics artist (St Trinian's School), dies at age 91.

=== Specific date unknown ===
- Didier Geluck, aka Diluck, Belgian cartoonist (published in Pourquoi Pas? and Le Drapeau Rouge) and father of Philippe Geluck, dies at age 86 or 87.
- Antonio Ghura, British comics artist (Truly Amazing Love Stories, Bogey), dies at age 60 or 61.

== Exhibitions and shows ==
- May 12–June 25: "Zap: Masters of Psychedelic Art, 1965-74" (Andrew Edlin Gallery, New York City) — featuring the work of Robert Crumb, Robert Williams, Rick Griffin, Victor Moscoso, S. Clay Wilson, Gilbert Shelton, and Spain Rodriguez
- May 26–August 19: "Marvels & Monsters: Unmasking Asian Images in U.S. Comics, 1942–1986" (NYU Fales Library & Special Collections, New York City) — taken from the William F. Wu Collection at the Fales Library. Later traveled to the Asian/Pacific/American Institute at NYU (2011), the Asian Arts Initiative (Philadelphia, 2012), the Multicultural Success Center, Indiana University–Purdue University Indianapolis (Indianapolis, 2012), the Museum of Chinese in America (New York City, 2012–2013), the Japanese American National Museum (Little Tokyo, Los Angeles, 2013–2014), and Stony Brook University (Stony Brook, New York, 2014)
- June 30–October 16: "Lyonel Feininger: At the Edge of the World" (Whitney Museum of American Art, New York City)

== Conventions ==
- March 4–6: Emerald City ComiCon (Washington State Convention & Trade Center, Seattle, Washington, US) — 32,000 attendees; guests: Frank Quitely, Jonathan Hickman, Max Brooks, Geof Darrow, Steve Epting, Jacen Burrows, Guy Davis, Terry & Rachel Dodson, Mike McKone, Sergio Aragonés, Dan Jurgens, Marv Wolfman, Cameron Stewart, John Arcudi, Yanick Paquette, Bruce Timm, Brian Michael Bendis, Frank Cho, J. G. Jones, Mike Mignola, Tony Harris, Jim Cheung, Matt Fraction, Cully Hamner, Ron Marz, Erik Larsen, Mark Brooks, Todd Nauck, Adam Hughes, Skottie Young, Dustin Nguyen, Greg Rucka, Ed Brubaker, Jeff Parker, C. B. Cebulski, Michael Avon Oeming, Doug TenNapel, John Layman, Tim Sale, Ryan Ottley, Ben Templesmith, David Mack, Jason Pearson, Karl Kesel, Jim Mahfood, Nick Spencer, Cliff Chiang, Darick Robertson, Pete Woods, Kurt Busiek, Scott Allie, Farel Dalrymple, Todd Dezago, Joshua Hale Fialkov, Chrissie Zullo, Tony Shasteen, Chris Roberson, Mark Morales, Paul Azaceta, Ray Fawkes, Jeremy Haun, Humberto Ramos, Francisco Herrera, Pia Guerra, Brian Hurtt, Ryan Benjamin, Andy Kuhn, Joe Quinones, Raina Telgemeier, Sean Gordon Murphy, Ivan Brandon, Kris Straub, Dave Kellett, Scott Kurtz, Brad Guigar, Danielle Corsetto, Jeph Jacques, Ian Boothby, Jim Zubkavich, Dave Stewart, Dustin Weaver, Sean Galloway, and Brandon Graham
- March 5–6: STAPLE! — event expands to two days for the first time; guests include Jill Thompson, Alex Robinson, Brian Clevinger, Scott Wegener, and James O'Barr
- March 18–20: Chicago Comic & Entertainment Expo (C2E2) (McCormick Place, Chicago, Illinois, US) — guests include Chris Hemsworth
- March 18–20: Wizard World Toronto (Direct Energy Centre, Hall D, Toronto, Ontario, Canada)
- March 19–20: Small Press and Alternative Comics Expo (S.P.A.C.E.) (Ramada Plaza Hotel & Conference Center, Columbus, Ohio)
- March 25–27: MegaCon (Orange County Convention Center, Orlando, Florida, US) — guests include Stan Lee, William Shatner, and Jimmy Palmiotti
- April 1–3: WonderCon (Moscone Center, San Francisco, California, US)
- April 9–10: Kapow! Comic Convention (London, UK) — first iteration of this event, organized by Scottish comics writer Mark Millar; guests include Sean Phillips, Dave Gibbons, Frank Quitely, John Romita Jr., Jock, Doug Braithwaite, Ian Churchill, Olivier Coipel, Duncan Fegredo, Simon Furman, David Lafuente, John McCrea, Liam Sharp, and Leinil Yu
- April 9–10: MoCCA Festival (69th Regiment Armory, New York City, US)
- April 9–10: Toronto ComiCON Fan Appreciation Event (Metro Toronto Convention Centre, Toronto, Ontario, Canada)
- April 15–17: Pittsburgh Comicon (Monroeville Convention Center, Monroeville, Pennsylvania, US) — guests include George Pérez, Terry Moore, Mike Grell, Tom Mandrake, Ernie Chan, Herb Trimpe, Scott McDaniel, Joshua Ortega, Joe Jusko, Gary Friedrich, Talent Caldwell, Stuart Sayger, Bob Almond, Wayne Faucher, Chad Hardin, Bob Hall, Kirk Lindo, Arvell Jones, Dan Parent, Billy Tucci, Dave Hoover, Mike Grell, Sam Witwer, and Sarah Allen
- April 16–17: Stumptown Comics Fest (Oregon Convention Center, Portland, Oregon)
- April 23: FLUKE Mini-Comics & Zine Festival (40 Watt, Athens, Georgia)
- May 7–8: Toronto Comic Arts Festival (Toronto Reference Library, Toronto, Canada)
- May 13–15: Motor City Comic Con (Suburban Collection Showplace, Novi, Michigan, US) — guests include David Petersen, Tim Sale, George Takei, Brent Spiner, Kate Mulgrew, Tricia Helfer, Sam Huntington, and Ernie Hudson
- May 14–15: Comic Expo (Ramada City Inn/Mercure Holland House Hotel, Bristol, UK) — guests include Martin Asbury, Paul Grist, Dave Gibbons, Rick Veitch, and Richard Starkings
- May 20–21: East Coast Black Age of Comics Convention (African American Museum in Philadelphia and Crowne Plaza Hotel, Philadelphia, Pennsylvania) — guests include Jerry Craft, Alex Simmons, and Eric Battle; presentation of the Glyph Comics Awards
- May 21–22: Dallas Comic Con (Irving Convention Center at Las Colinas, Irving, Texas, US) — guests include Stan Lee, John Romita, Jr., Amanda Conner, Jimmy Palmiotti, Cal Slayton, Bernie Wrightson, Steve Niles, Tim Bradstreet, Rick Leonardi, Kerry Gammill, Todd Nauck, James O'Barr, and Michael Lark
- May 21–22: Wizard World Big Apple Comic Con (Penn Plaza Pavilion, New York City, US)
- May 26–29: Phoenix Comicon (Phoenix, Arizona, US) — 23,001 attendees; official guests: Stan Lee, Wil Wheaton, Leonard Nimoy, George Takei, Sandeep Parikh, Jeff Lewis, Cassandra Peterson, Billy Dee Williams, Paul McGillion, Todd McFarlane, Max Brooks, Bruce Boxleitner, Jaime Paglia, Aaron Douglas, Alex Albrecht, Kristin Bauer van Straten, Vic Mignogna, Brina Palencia, and Ernie Hudson
- June 3–5: Heroes Convention (Charlotte Convention Center, Charlotte, North Carolina, US) — guests include Josh Adams, Neal Adams, Bob Almond, Jim Amash, John Arcudi, Robert Atkins, Jeremy Bastian, Paul Benjamin, Eddie Berganza, Pat Broderick, Mark Brooks, Stephanie Buscema, Talent Caldwell, Richard Case, Nick Cardy, Cliff Chiang, Frank Cho, Becky Cloonan, Paty Cockrum, Darwyn Cooke, Jeremy Dale, Farel Dalrymple, Geof Darrow, Shane Davis, Todd Dezago, Kristian Donaldson, Michael Dooney, Evan Dorkin, Sarah Dyer, Nathan Edmondson, Tommy Lee Edwards, Steve Epting, Tom Feister, Ian Flynn, Tom Fowler, Matt Fraction, Francesco Francavilla, Gary Friedrich, Chris Giarrusso, Michael Golden, Keron Grant, Jackson Guice, Cully Hamner, Scott Hampton, Scott Hanna, Dustin Harbin, Tony Harris, Jeremy Haun, Clayton Henry, Jonathan Hickman, Adam Hughes, Jeff Johnson, Nat Jones, Joe Jusko, Karl Kesel, Matt Kindt, Scott Kolins, Peter Krause, Roger Langridge, Jason Latour, Rick Leonardi, Mike Lilly, Heidi MacDonald, David W. Mack, Kevin Maguire, Clay Mann, Laura Martin, Nathan Massengill, Paul Maybury, Ed McGuinness, Bob McLeod, Carla Speed McNeil, Terry Moore, Tony Moore, Chris Moreno, Sean Murphy, Steve Niles, Mike Norton, Phil Noto, Kevin Nowlan, Jeff Parker, Jason Pearson, Brandon Peterson, Ed Piskor, Chris Pitzer, Joe Pruett, Gary Reed, Chris Roberson, Andrew Robinson, Budd Root, Don Rosa, Craig Rousseau, Stéphane Roux, Jim Rugg, Andy Runton, Tim Sale, Alex Saviuk, Jim Scancarelli, Tom Scioli, Declan Shalvey, Ryan Sook, Charles Soule, Jim Starlin, Joe Staton, Brian Stelfreeze, Karl Story, Mark Texeira, Art Thibert, Roy Thomas, Rich Tommaso, William Tucci, Tim Townsend, Dean Trippe, Koi Turnbull, Jen Van Meter, Ethan Van Sciver, Tim Vigil, Dexter Vines, Chris Walker, Loston Wallace, Michael W. Watkins, Renée Witterstaetter, Bernie Wrightson, Skottie Young, Jim Zubkavich, and Chrissie Zullo
- June 12: Scranton Comic Book Convention (Johnson College, Scranton, Pennsylvania, US) — guests include Scott Beatty, Dawn Best, Ed Coutts, Ken Haeser, C.J. Henderson, Dave Hoover, Paul Kupperberg, Alitha Martinez, Rudy Nebres, and Dan Parent
- June 17–19: Calgary Comic & Entertainment Expo (Calgary, Alberta, Canada)
- June 17–19: Expo Comic MX (Mexico City, Mexico)
- June 17–19: Philadelphia Comic Con (Pennsylvania Convention Center, Philadelphia, Pennsylvania, US) — guests include Aaron Kuder, Al Wiesner, Arthur Suydam, Bill Sienkiewicz, Bob Wiacek, Brad Guigar, C. Martin Croker, C. J. Henderson, Carlos Pacheco, Christopher Baldwin, Damion Scott, Dave Ryan, David Rankin, David Wong, Daxiong, Dennis Calero, Doug Braithwaite, Edgar Delgado, Ethan Van Sciver, Farel Dalrymple, Francisco Herrera, Franco Aureliani, Greg Horn, Humberto Ramos, J. David Spurlock, J. G. Jones, J.K. Woodward, Jim Calafiore, Jim Cheung, Jimmy Gownley, Johnny Zito, Jonathan Maberry, Josh Howard, Keith R. A. DeCandido, Kevin Maguire, Kim DeMulder, Koi Turnbull, Lou Ferrigno, Matt Howarth, Michael J. Sullivan, Mike Grell, Mike Lilly, Minck Oosterveer, Nathan Edmondson, Phil Jimenez, Ray Billingsley, Shane Davis, Terry LaBan, Tim Truman, Todd Klein, Tom Hodges, Tom Raney, Tony Bedard, Tony DiGerolamo, and Tony Trov
- June 24–26: Albuquerque Comic Expo (Albuquerque, New Mexico, US)
- June 24–26: Texas Comicon (San Antonio, Texas, US)
- June 26: Paris Comic Expo (Paris, France)
- July 2–3: Armageddon (Christchurch Expo Addington Raceway, Christchurch, New Zealand)
- July 8–10: London Film and Comic Con (Earls Court Exhibition Centre, London, England, UK)
- July 21–24: Comic-Con International (San Diego Convention Center, San Diego, California, US) — 126,000+ attendees; official guests" Gerry Alanguilan, Sergio Aragonés, Jean Bails, Ed Benes, Anina Bennett, Jordi Bernet, Yves Bigerel, Joyce Brabner, Patricia Briggs, Chester Brown, Ernie Chan, Jo Chen, Seymour Chwast, Alan Davis, Dick DeBartolo, Tony DeZuniga, Eric Drooker, Garth Ennis, Mark Evanier, Joyce Farmer, David Finch, Dave Gibbons, Tsuneo Goda, Paul Guinan, Kim Harrison (Dawn Cook), Jonathan Hickman, John Higgins, Charlie Huston, Jamal Igle, Joëlle Jones, Sherrilyn Kenyon, Peter Kuper, Richard Kyle, Mell Lazarus, Jim Lee, Paul Levitz, David Lloyd, Patricia Lupoff, Richard A. Lupoff, Patrick McDonnell, Rebecca Moesta, Christopher Moore, Grant Morrison, Alex Niño, Ethan Nicolle, Malachai Nicolle, Anders Nilsen, Jerry Robinson, Bill Schelly, Scott Shaw, Louise Simonson, Walter Simonson, Jeff Smith, Frank Stack, Jim Steranko, Cameron Stewart, Dave Stewart, J. Michael Straczynski, Mark Tatulli, Roy Thomas, Maggie Thompson, Peter J. Tomasi, Scott Westerfeld, and Ashley Wood
- July 29–31: Steel City Con (Pittsburgh, Pennsylvania, US)
- August 6–7: CAPTION: "Austerity" (East Oxford Community Centre, Oxford, England, UK)
- August 11–14: Wizard World Chicago (Donald E. Stephens Convention Center, Rosemont, Illinois, US) — official guests: Jim Cheung, Brian Azzarello, Eduardo Risso, Gregg Hurwitz, Ariel Olivetti, Electra Avellan, Elise Avellan, Morena Baccarin, Betsy Baker, Julia Benson, Amy Bruni, David Della Rocco, Hal Delrich, Ted DiBiase, Brandon DiCamillo, Kelly Donovan, Lou Ferrigno, Dan Fogler, Gil Gerard, Noah Hathaway, Alaina Huffman, Maria Kanellis, Patricia Kara, Ken Anderson, Clare Kramer, Mercedes McNab, Barbara Nedeljáková, Gena Lee Nolin, Miguel Nunez, Kai Owen, Chandler Riggs, Ellen Sandweiss, Daniel Stewart, Theresa Tilly, Lisa Marie Varon, Val Venis, Virgil, Torrie Wilson, Eric Adams, Dave Atkins, Brian Azzarello, Franco Aureliani, Art Baltazar, Jolly Blackburn, Ian Boothby, Tom Brazelton, Brimstone, Jeffrey Brown, Ivan Brunetti, Steve Bryant, Jim Calafiore, Matt Campbell, David Campiti, Lilli Carré, C. Martin Croker, Geof Darrow, Daxiong, Mike Deodato, Jeff Easley, Larry Elmore, Alan Evans, Ben Fisher, Nathan Fox, Kevin Freeman, Gary Friedrich, Paul Friedrich, Patrick Gleason, Michael Golden, Mike Grell, Pia Guerra, Michael Harvey, Tom Hodges, Greg Horn, Paul Jenkins, Nat Jones, Don Kramer, Mike Lynch, David W. Mack, Nina Matsumoto, Glenn McCoy, Mike McKone, John Jackson Miller, Jeff Miracola, B. Clay Moore, Stuart Moore, Paul Mounts, Mark A. Nelson, Rafael Nieves, Angus Oblong, Ariel Olivetti, Eric Olsen, Phil Ortiz, Dan Parent, Jim Pavelec, Justin Pierce, Andrew Pepoy, John Porcellino, Nate Powell, Humberto Ramos, Bill Reinhold, Eduardo Risso, Tim Seeley, Bill Sienkiewicz, Mike Stoklasa, William Stout, Arthur Suydam, Ben Templesmith, Mark Texeira, Koi Turnbull, Ethan Van Sciver, Matt Wagner, Chris Walker, Steve Wallace, Freddie Williams II, David Willis, Renée Witterstaetter, and David Wong
- August 20–21: Baltimore Comic-Con (Baltimore Convention Center, Baltimore, Maryland, US)
- August 27: ComiCONN (Stamford, Connecticut, US)
- August 25–28: Fan Expo Canada (Metro Toronto Convention Centre, Toronto, Ontario, Canada) — 80,000 attendees; guests include William Shatner, Hayden Panettiere, Tom Felton, Eliza Dushku, Katee Sackhoff, John Astin, Anthony Daniels, Robert Englund, Lexa Doig, Vic Mignogna, Jeff Smith, Junko Mizuno, Lee Majors, Gary Kurtz, Kevin Sorbo, Michael Shanks, Barbara Eden, Larry Hagman, Michael Biehn, Nichelle Nichols, Marina Sirtis, Ethan Phillips, Malcolm McDowell, John Waters, Elvira, Doug Bradley, Danielle Harris, Tom Savini, Heather Brewer, Robert J. Sawyer, Martin Landau, Colleen Clinkenbeard, Caitlin Glass, Veronica Taylor, Lance Henriksen, Christopher Sabat, Mike McFarland, Brad Swaile, Joe Kubert, Anna Silk, Tony Moore, Tony Daniel, Andy Kubert, Adam Kubert, Stuart Immonen, Steve McNiven, Ethan Van Sciver, Chris Claremont, Dan DiDio, C.B. Cebulski, Steve Epting, Matt Fraction, David Finch, Jason Aaron, James Robinson, Fred Van Lente, Jill Thompson, Dan Slott, Alex Maleev, Yanick Paquette, Dale Eaglesham, Jonathan Hickman, Dale Keown, Jimmy Cheung, Jason Deline, Victor Lucas, Scott Jones, Tommy Tallarico, Jarett Cale, Ed Greenwood, Robin D. Laws, Casts of Todd and the Book of Pure Evil, Lost Girl, Dark Rising, Medium Raw: Night of the Wolf, Pure Pwnage, Electric Playground, and Reviews on the Run and surprise guest Guillermo del Toro
- September 2–5: Dragon Con (Hyatt Regency Atlanta/Marriott Marquis/Atlanta Hilton/Sheraton/Westin Peachtree Plaza, Atlanta, Georgia, US) — 46,000 attendees; guests included Glenn Barr, Julie Bell, Joe Benitez, J. Scott Campbell, Amanda Conner, Darwyn Cooke, Peter David, Mike Grell, Karl Kesel, Stan Lee, Todd Lockwood, Don Maitz, Mike McKone, Jimmy Palmiotti, George Pérez, Don Rosa, Jim Starlin, Peter Steigerwald, Jim Steranko, William Stout, Koi Turnbull, Boris Vallejo, Michael Whelan, Bernie Wrightson, and Derek Yaniger
- September 10–11: El Paso Comic Con (El Paso, Texas)
- September 10–11: Small Press Expo (Bethesda North Marriott Hotel & Conference Center, North Bethesda, Maryland)
- September 17–18: Montreal Comiccon (Place Bonaventure, Montreal, Quebec, Canada) — 20,000+ attendees; guests include Stan Lee (Guest of Honour), Adam West, Burt Ward, James Marsters, Doug Bradley, Sid Haig, Michael Dorn, Marina Sirtis, David Prowse (canceled), Clare Kramer, Mercedes McNab, Jeremy Bulloch, Maria de Aragon, Gil Gerard, Erin Gray, Noelle Hannibal, Neal Adams, Josh Adams, Sergio Aragonés, Jim Starlin (canceled), Stan Sakai, Gail Simone, Joe Benitez, Pia Guerra, Ian Boothby, Herb Trimpe, Dale Eaglesham, Vic Mignogna, Dany, Sgt Slaughter, Rick Martel, and Todd van der Heyden
- September 17–18: New England Comic-Con (Boston, Massachusetts, US)
- September 24–25: Wizard World Los Angeles (Los Angeles Convention Center, Los Angeles, California) — event postponed on August 15, 2011
- September 24: Massachusetts Independent Comics Expo [MICE] (University Hall, Lesley University, Cambridge, Massachusetts)
- September 29–October 2: International Comic Arts Forum (Center for Cartoon Studies, Colodny Building, White River Junction, Vermont) — guests include Frémok, Pavel Kořínek & Tomáš Prokůpek, Robert Sikoryak, Stephen R. Bissette, Jason Lutes, and James Sturm
- October–November: Amadora BD (Amadora, Portugal) — 22nd edition; dedicated to humor; special guests included Jean Schulz and Shannon Wheeler
- October 1–2: Alternative Press Expo (Concourse Exhibition Center, San Francisco, California, US)
- October 11–14: New York Comic Con (Jacob K. Javits Convention Center, New York City, US)
- October 22–23: Mid-Ohio Con (Greater Columbus Convention Center, Columbus, Ohio) — headline guests: Adam West, Burt Ward, Rob Liefeld; other guests: David W. Mack, Bill Sienkiewicz, Jeff Smith, Arthur Suydam, Pasqual Ferry, Mike Grell, Greg Horn, Phil Jimenez, Michael Golden, Mark Texeira, Charles Skaggs, Chris Sprouse, Eric Wight, Eliza Frye, Steve Hamaker, Ed Piskor, Thomas Scioli, Marc Sumerak, Carol Tyler, and Ryan Ottley
- October 28–30: Central Canada Comic Con (Winnipeg Convention Centre, Winnipeg, Manitoba, Canada) — guests include William Shatner, Jonathan Frakes, Kevin Sorbo, Kate Vernon, Ethan Phillips, Nana Visitor, Chase Masterson, Adrienne Wilkinson, Maria de Aragon, and Bret "The Hitman" Hart
- October 28–31: Armageddon Auckland Expo (ASB Showgrounds, Auckland, New Zealand)
- November 3–25: Comica — London International Comics Festival (various venues, London, UK) — organized by Paul Gravett; guests include Hannah Berry, Warren Ellis, Lenny Henry, Richard McGuire, Kent Worcester, Daniel Merlin Goodbrey, Frederik Peeters, Robert Sellers, Savage Pencil, Steve Aylett
- November 5–6: Comikaze Expo (Los Angeles Convention Center, Los Angeles, California) — 35,000 attendees; guests include Stan Lee, Elvira, Mark Hamill, Tony Todd, Ernest Borgnine, Tippi Hedren, Morgan Fairchild, Jhonen Vasquez, Lisa Foiles, Kel Mitchell, Josh Server, Robert Venditti, Marina Sirtis, Garrett Wang, Robert Beltran, Lori Beth Denberg, Cast of Nickelodeon's All That, Cast of Sushi Girl, Cast of Bad Kids Go to Hell, Cast of Police Academy, Select Cast of Star Trek: Voyager and Star Trek: Deep Space Nine, Top Shelf Comics, Top Cow Comics, Pow! Entertainment
- November 5: WildPig Comic Convention (Holiday Inn, Somerset, New Jersey) — official guests include Neil Vokes, Fernando Ruiz, and Rudy Nebres
- November 8–13: Komikazen (Ravenna, Italy) — guests include Amir & Khalil, Seth Tobocman, and Ganzeer
- November 11–13: Austin Comic Con (Austin, Texas) — run by Wizard Entertainment
- November 12: Comica Comiket (Great Hall, Bishopsgate Institute, London, England) — Drawing Parade participants include Brecht Evens, Posy Simmonds, Luke Pearson, Sarah McIntyre, Warren Pleece, and Roger Langridge
- November 24: Genghis Con (Beachland Ballroom, Cleveland, Ohio) — guests included John Porcellino

== First issues by title ==
'68
Release: April by Image Comics. Writer: Mark Kidwell, Artists: Nat Jones and Jay Fotos
All Fall Down
Release: by Arcana Studios. Writer: Casey Jones. Artists: Jason Reeves, Gian Fernando, Brian Brinlee, Anvit Randeria, Cirque Studios, and Pericles Junior.
Annihilators
Release: March by Marvel Comics. Writers: Dan Abnett, Andy Lanning Artist: Tan Eng Huat
Avenging Spider-Man
Release: November by Marvel Comics. Writer: Zeb Wells Artist: Joe Madureira
Bad Island
Release: August by Grafix. Writer: Doug TenNapel Artist: Doug TenNapel
Batman: Arkham City
Release: July by DC Comics. Writer: Paul Dini Artist: Carlos D'Anda
Drums
Release: May by Image. Writer: El Torres Artist: Abe Hernando
Fear Itself
Release: March by Marvel Comics. Writer: Matt Fraction Artist: Stuart Immonen
Graveyard of Empires
Release: June by Image Comics. Writer: Mark Sable Artist: Paul Azaceta
The Last of the Greats
Release: October by Image Comics. Writer: Joshua Hale Fialkov Artist: Brent Peeples
Near Death
Release: September by Image Comics. Writer: Jay Faerber Artist: Simone Guglielmini
Nordguard
Release: by Sofawolf Press. Artists: Tess Garman and Teagan Gavet
Spaceman
Release: October by Vertigo. Writer: Brian Azzarello Artist: Eduardo Risso
Super Dinosaur
Release: April by Image Comics (Skybound imprint). Writer: Robert Kirkman Artist: Jason Howard
Wolverine and the X-Men
Release: October by Marvel Comics. Writer: Jason Aaron Artist: Chris Bachalo

== See also ==
- List of The New York Times Manga Best Sellers of 2011
