= Francesco Francavilla =

Italian comic book artist

- Francavilla at Dragon Con in 2026
- Born: Francesco Francavilla
- Areas: Writer, Penciller, Artist, Inker, Letterer, Colourist
- Notable works: Zorro; Detective Comics; Black Panther; The Black Beetle; Afterlife with Archie
- Awards: "Favourite Newcomer Artist" Eagle Award 2012 "Best Cover Artist" Eisner Award 2012
- http://www.francescofrancavilla.com https://francesco-francavilla.blogspot.com/ pulpsunday.blogspot.com http://theblackbeetle.blogspot.com

Francesco Francavilla is an Italian comic book artist known for his creator-owned series The Black Beetle and pulp-inspired comic covers. Other notable works include The Black Coat (which he co-created), Dynamite's Zorro series, and his recent run on Detective Comics with Scott Snyder and Jock.

== Career ==
Francesco Francavilla made his professional comics debut in the Italian comics anthology Amazing Comics.

Within the industry he has become known for his pulp and retro-inspired style. He runs a blog, Pulp Sunday, dedicated to this kind of work. His cover work is particularly noteworthy, he won an Eisner for it in 2012.

He has worked as an interior artist for both Marvel Comics (Black Panther: The Man without Fear, Captain America and Bucky, Hawkeye) and DC Comics (Detective Comics for The Black Mirror story arc, which won the 2012 Eisner for best ongoing series). Most recently he has been focusing on The Black Beetle, a series he originally created for his Pulp Sunday blog, which is now being published by Dark Horse Comics. This series has already had wide critical acclaim and has been made an ongoing series as a part of Dark Horse Comics' superhero push.

Nowadays, he is the featured visual artist in today's issue of The New York Times Magazine, his artwork is now moving into the non-fiction realm. He also has continued to work with both Dark Horse and Detective Comics over the past few years, with some of his recent works including The Joker: The Man the Stopped Laughing and Night of the Ghoul. At the end of 2024 it was announced that Francavillia would be working once again with Scott Snyder on Snyder’s latest comic series White Boat, which is set to be released in 2025.

== Bibliography ==
Interior comic work includes:

- The Black Coat (with Adam Cogan and Ben Lichius, Ape Entertainment):
  - A Call to Arms #1-4 (2006)
  - Or Give Me Death #1 (of 4) (2007)
- Sea of Red #11-13 (layouts for Paul Harmon, written by Rick Remender, Image, 2006)
- 24Seven Volume 2: "Confession" (script and art, anthology graphic novel, Image, 2007)
- Fear Agent #11: "Along Come a Spider" (with Rick Remender, Image, 2007)
- Left on Mission #1-5 (with Chip Mosher, Boom! Studios, 2007)
- Sorrow #1-4 (with Rick Remender and Seth Peck, Image, 2007–2008)
- Zorro vol. 6 #1-8, 15-20 (with Matt Wagner, Dynamite, 2008–2010)
- Tales of the Starlight Drive-in: "1966" and "1972" (with Michael San Giacomo, anthology graphic novel, Image, 2008)
- The Fantastic Worlds of Frank Frazetta: Dracula Meets the Wolfman (with Steve Niles, one-shot, Image, 2009)
- Scalped #27: "High Lonesome, Part Three: The Ballad of Baylis Earl Nitz" (with Jason Aaron, Vertigo, 2009)
- Green Hornet: Year One #1-6 (colors on Aaron Campbell, written by Matt Wagner, Dynamite, 2010)
- Garrison #1-6 (with Jeff Mariotte, Wildstorm, 2010)
- Detective Comics (DC Comics):
  - "Skeleton Cases" (with Scott Snyder, in vol. 1 #871-872, 874-875 and 879, 2011)
  - "The Face in the Glass" (with Scott Snyder and Jock, in vol. 1 #881, 2011)
  - "Rain" (script and art, in vol. 2 #27, 2011)
- Black Panther (with David Liss, Marvel):
  - The Man without Fear #513-515, 517-518 and 521-523 (2011)
  - The Most Dangerous Man Alive #524 (2011)
- Captain America (Marvel):
  - "Old Wounds" (with Ed Brubaker and James Asmus, in #625-628, 2011–2012)
  - "Captain America and Black Widow" (with Cullen Bunn, in #636-640, 2012–2013)
- Outlaw Territory Volume 2: "Lullaby" (script and art, anthology graphic novel, Image, 2011)
- The Black Beetle (script and art, Dark Horse):
  - Dark Horse Presents (anthology):
    - "The Night Shift" (in vol. 2 #11-13, 2012)
    - "Kara Böcek" (in vol. 3 #28-32, 2016–2017)
  - No Way Out #1-4 (2013)
  - Necrologue #1-5 (announced for 2013; unreleased)
- Swamp Thing vol. 5 #10: "Arcane's Lullaby" (with Scott Snyder, DC Comics, 2012)
- Robert E. Howard's Savage Sword #5: "Dark Agnes" (with Paul Tobin, anthology, Dark Horse, 2012)
- Hawkeye vol. 4 #10, 12 (with Matt Fraction, Marvel, 2013)
- Batwoman #21: "Interlude III" (with Haden Blackman and J. H. Williams III, DC Comics, 2013)
- Afterlife with Archie #1-10 (with Roberto Aguirre-Sacasa, Archie Comics, 2013–2016)
- American Vampire Anthology #1: "The Producers" (script and art, Vertigo, 2013)
- Guardians of the Galaxy vol. 3 #8-9: "Infinity" (with Brian Michael Bendis, Marvel, 2013–2014)
- Vertigo Quarterly: CMYK #4 "The Dying of the Light" (script and art, anthology, Vertigo, 2015)
- The Shadow #100: "The Laughing Corpse" (script and art, co-feature, Dynamite, 2015)
- Moon Knight vol. 6 #5-9 (with Jeff Lemire, Greg Smallwood, Wilfredo Torres and James Stokoe, Marvel, 2016–2017)
- All-Star Batman #6-9: "The Cursed Wheel, Act Two" (with Scott Snyder, co-feature, DC Comics, 2017)
- Will Eisner's The Spirit: The Corpse Makers #1-5 (script and art, Dynamite, 2017–2018)
- DC Holiday Special 2017: "Going Down Easy" (with Tom King, anthology, DC Comics, 2018)
- Hungry Ghosts #4: "The Cow Head" (with Anthony Bourdain, anthology, Berger Books, 2018)
- Shock (script and art, anthology graphic novel, Aftershock):
  - "Invasion" (in Volume 1, 2018)
  - "The Last Confession" (in Volume 2, 2019)

=== Covers only ===
- Zorro vol. 6 #9-11, 13-14 (Dynamite, 2008–2009)
- The Good, the Bad and the Ugly #1 (Dynamite, 2009)
- The Perhapanauts Halloween Spooktacular #1 (Image, 2009)
- Hack/Slash: The Series #32 (Devil's Due, 2010)
- The Lone Ranger #21-22 (colors on John Cassaday) (Dynamite, 2010)
- Green Hornet: Year One #2-12 (Dynamite, 2010–2011)
- Kato Origins #1-11 (Dynamite, 2010–2011)
- The Broadcast tpb (NBM Publishing, 2010)
- Sherlock Holmes (Dynamite):
  - Year One #1-6 (2011)
  - The Liverpool Demon #1-5 (2012–2013)
  - Moriarty Lives #1-5 (2013–2014)
- Hellboy: The Fury #1 (Dark Horse, 2011)
- B.P.R.D. Hell on Earth: Monsters #1 (Dark Horse, 2011)
- Baltimore: The Curse Bells #1 (Dark Horse, 2011)
- Abe Sapien: The Devil Does Not Jest #1 (Dark Horse, 2011)
- Warlord of Mars: Fall of Barsoom #1-3 (Dynamite, 2011–2012)
- The Lone Ranger: The Death of Zorro #1-5 (Dynamite, 2011)
- Pigs #2 (Image, 2011)
- Pilot Season: Fleshdigger #1 (Top Cow, 2011)
- The Last of the Greats #1 (Image, 2011)
- Dark Shadows vol. 4 #1-23 (Dynamite, 2011–2013)
- Flash Gordon: Zeitgeist #1-8 (Dynamite, 2011–2013)
- Black Panther: The Most Dangerous Man Alive #525-529 (Marvel, 2012)
- The Lone Ranger vol. 2 #1-25 (Dynamite, 2012–2014)
- Archie #627-630, 700 (Archie Comics, 2012; 2019)
- Lord of the Jungle #2-6 (Dynamite, 2012)
- Near Death #6-11 (Image, 2012)
- Smoke and Mirrors #3 (IDW Publishing, 2012)
- The Shadow vol. 7 #1, 5-25 (Dynamite, 2012–2014)
- The Spider #1-13 (Dynamite, 2012–2013)
- Mind the Gap #2 (Image, 2012)
- The Lovecraft Anthology Volume 2 gn (Self Made Hero, 2012)
- Star Trek TNG/Doctor Who: Assimilation^{2} #4 (IDW Publishing, 2012)
- American Vampire #30 (Vertigo, 2012)
- Resurrection Man vol. 2 #0, 12 (DC Comics, 2012)
- Life with Archie vol. 2 #23 (Archie Comics, 2012)
- Masks #1, 7 (Dynamite, 2012–2013)
- Mars Attacks vol. 3 #6 (IDW Publishing, 2012)
- Marvel Zombies Halloween Special #1 (Marvel, 2012)
- Doctor Who: Prisoners of Time #1-12 (IDW Publishing, 2013)
- New Crusaders: Rise of the Heroes #5 (Red Circle, 2013)
- Uncanny X-Men vol. 3 #1 (Marvel, 2013)
- Lost Vegas #1-4 (Image, 2013)
- Red She-Hulk #63-67 (Marvel, 2013)
- Secret Avengers vol. 2 #5 (Marvel, 2013)
- The Colonized #4 (IDW Publishing, 2013)
- Lords of Mars #1 (Dynamite, 2013)
- Codename: Action #1 (Dynamite, 2013)
- Grindhouse (Dark Horse):
  - Doors Open at Midnight #1, 3, 5, 7 (2013–2014)
  - Drive In, Bleed Out #3, 5, 7 (2015)
- Witchblade #170 (Top Cow, 2013)
- Legends of the Dark Knight vol. 2 Chapter 74 (DC Digital, 2013)
- Robert E. Howard's Savage Sword #6 (Dark Horse, 2013)
- Fantomex MAX #1-4 (Marvel MAX, 2013–2014)
- Savage Wolverine #9 (Marvel, 2013)
- Avengers Arena #16-17 (Marvel, 2013–2014)
- The Mighty Avengers vol. 2 #2, 11 (Marvel, 2013–2014)
- The Twilight Zone vol. 3 #1-12 (Dynamite, 2013–2014)
- Hellblazer Volume 7: Tainted Love tpb (Vertigo, 2014)
- Captain America: Living Legend #4 (Marvel, 2014)
- The Bunker #1 (Oni Press, 2014)
- Wraith #5 (IDW Publishing, 2014)
- Zero #6 (Image, 2014)
- Apocalypse Al #2 (Joe's Comics, 2014)
- Night of the Living Deadpool #1 (Marvel, 2014)
- The X-Files: Season 10 #10-25 (IDW Publishing, 2014–2015)
- Doctor Spektor: Master of the Occult #1-4 (Dynamite, 2014)
- Starlight #3 (Image, 2014)
- Silver Surfer vol. 5 #1-2 (Marvel, 2014)
- The X-Files: Year Zero #1 (IDW Publishing, 2014)
- Army of Darkness: Ash Gets Hitched #1-4 (Dynamite, 2014)
- Justice, Inc. vol. 3 #1-6 (Dynamite, 2014–2015)
- Bodies #2 (Vertigo, 2014)
- Wytches #1 (Image, 2014)
- The Damnation of Charlie Wormwood #1 (Dynamite, 2014)
- Chilling Adventures of Sabrina #1-2 (Archie Comics, 2014–2015)
- Empire of the Dead: Act Two #1 (Marvel, 2014)
- Django/Zorro #1-7 (Vertigo/Dynamite, 2014–2015)
- Revival #25 (Image, 2014)
- Shaft #1-6 (Dynamite, 2014–2015)
- The Valiant #1-4 (Valiant, 2014–2015)
- Original Sin Annual #1 (Marvel, 2014)
- The New Avengers vol. 3 #26 (Marvel, 2015)
- The Twilight Zone: Shadow and Substance #1-4 (Dynamite, 2015)
- Sensation Comics vol. 2 Chapter 26 (DC Digital, 2015)
- Archie vs. Predator #1 (Dark Horse, 2015)
- Re-Animator #1-4 (Dynamite, 2015)
- The Black Hood #1-10 (Dark Circle, 2015–2016)
- Justice, Inc.: The Avenger #1-6 (Dynamite, 2015)
- Star Wars: Princess Leia #3 (Marvel, 2015)
- Fight Club 2 #2 (Dark Horse, 2015)
- All-New Hawkeye #2 (Marvel, 2015)
- Big Man Plans #4 (Image, 2015)
- Archie vs. Sharknado #1 (Archie Comics, 2015)
- Justice League: Gods and Monsters — Batman #1 (DC Digital, 2015)
- Secret Wars: Master of Kung Fu #1-4 (Marvel, 2015)
- Star Trek/Green Lantern #3 (IDW Publishing, 2015)
- Will Eisner's The Spirit vol. 8 #1 (Dynamite, 2015)
- Secret Wars: Ghost Racers #1-4 (Marvel, 2015)
- Drive #1 (IDW Publishing, 2015)
- Groot #2 (Marvel, 2015)
- Archie vol. 2 #1, 4 (Archie Comics, 2015–2016)
- Secret Wars: Battleworld #4 (Marvel, 2015)
- Exodus: The Life After #1 (Oni Press, 2015)
- Secret Wars: 1872 #3 (Marvel, 2015)
- James Bond #1-2 (Dynamite, 2015)
- Secret Wars: Age of Ultron vs. Marvel Zombies #3 (Marvel, 2015)
- G.I. Joe #219-220, Cobra World Order Prelude #1 (IDW Publishing, 2015)
- Star Wars: Shattered Empire #1 (Marvel, 2015)
- Jughead vol. 3 #1-2 (Archie Comics, 2015–2016)
- Judge Dredd vol. 2 #1 (IDW Publishing, 2015)
- Dreaming Eagles #1-6 (Aftershock, 2015–2016)
- Spider-Gwen vol. 2 #1 (Marvel, 2015)
- The Hangman vol. 2 #1 (Dark Circle, 2015)
- Seduction of the Innocent #1-4 (Dynamite, 2015–2016)
- Howling Commandos of S.H.I.E.L.D. #2 (Marvel, 2016)
- Nova vol. 6 #2 (Marvel, 2016)
- Army of Darkness: Furious Road #1 (Dynamite, 2016)
- Star Wars: Vader Down #1 (Marvel, 2016)
- Star Wars: Darth Vader #15 (Marvel, 2016)
- Star Wars vol. 4 #15-19 (Marvel, 2016)
- Black-Eyed Kids #1-15 (Aftershock, 2016–2017)
- The Twilight Zone: The Shadow #1-4 (Dynamite, 2016)
- Star Trek: Manifest Destiny #1 (IDW Publishing, 2016)
- The Amazing Spider-Man vol. 4 #1.4 (Marvel, 2016)
- Betty and Veronica vol. 3 #1 (Archie Comics, 2016)
- Ghost Stories of an Antiquary Volume 1-2 gn (Self Made Hero, 2016–2017)
- Archie Meets Ramones #1 (Archie Comics, 2016)
- X-O Manowar vol. 3 #50 (Valiant, 2016)
- Civil War II: Ulysses #1-6 (Marvel, 2016–2017)
- James Bond: Hammerhead #1-6 (Dynamite, 2016–2017)
- Serenity: No Power in the 'Verse #1 (Dark Horse, 2016)
- Josie and the Pussycats vol. 3 #1 (Archie Comics, 2016)
- Kiss vol. 4 #1 (Dynamite, 2016)
- Vote Loki #3 (Marvel, 2016)
- Star Wars: Poe Dameron #7 (Marvel, 2016)
- Animosity: The Rise #1 (Aftershock, 2017)
- Spider-Woman vol. 6 #13 (Marvel, 2017)
- Highlander: The American Dream #1 (IDW Publishing, 2017)
- Deadpool and the Mercs for Money vol. 2 #9 (Marvel, 2017)
- Guardians of the Galaxy vol. 3 #17 (Marvel, 2017)
- Monsters Unleashed vol. 2 #1-5 (Marvel, 2017)
- Riverdale #0-7 (Archie Comics, 2017)
- American Monster #6 (Aftershock, 2017)
- Jughead: The Hunger #0-1 (Archie Horror, 2017)
- Man-Thing vol. 5 #1 (Marvel, 2017)
- Babyteeth #1 (Aftershock, 2017)
- Centipede #1-5 (Dynamite, 2017)
- Unholy Grail #1-2 (Aftershock, 2017)
- Venomverse #2 (Marvel, 2017)
- Doctor Radar #1 (Titan, 2017)
- Monsters Unleashed vol. 3 #6 (Marvel, 2017)
- Chilling Adventures in Sorcery tpb (Archie Horror, 2017)
- Rasputin: Voice of the Dragon #3 (Dark Horse, 2018)
- Vampironica #1-5 (Archie Horror, 2018–2019)
- Kick-Ass vol. 2 #2 (Image, 2018)
- X-Men Blue #25 (Marvel, 2017)
- The Wild Storm #13 (Wildstorm, 2018)
- Transformers: Unicron #1-6 (IDW Publishing, 2018)
- Archie Meets Batman '66 #1 (DC Comics/Archie Comics, 2018)
- Star Wars Adventures (IDW Publishing):
  - Tales from Vader's Castle #1-5 (2018)
  - Return to Vader's Castle #1-5 (2019)
- Archie 1941 #1 (Archie Comics, 2018)
- The Lone Ranger vol. 3 #1 (Dynamite, 2018)
- Dr. Horrible: Best Friends Forever #1 (Dark Horse, 2018)
- Hit-Girl vol. 2 #11 (Image, 2018)
- Mars Attacks vol. 4 #1 (Dynamite, 2018)
- Elvira: The Shape of Elvira #1-4 (Dynamite, 2019)
- Betty and Veronica vol. 4 #1 (Archie Comics, 2019)
- Hit-Girl Season Two #1-4 (Image, 2019)
- Fight Club 3 #2 (Dark Horse, 2019)
- Blossoms 666 #1 (Archie Horror, 2019)
- The Six Million Dollar Man vol. 2 #1 (Dynamite, 2019)
- Jughead: The Hunger vs. Vampironica #1 (Archie Horror, 2019)
- Red Sonja and Vampirella Meet Betty and Veronica #1 (Dynamite, 2019)
- Archie: The Married Life – 10th Anniversary #1 (Archie Comics, 2019)
- You are Obsolete #1 (Aftershock, 2019)
- Archie vs. Predator II #1 (Dark Horse, 2019)
- Jughead's Time Police #1 (Archie Comics, 2019)
- Black Hammer/Justice League #4 (Dark Horse, 2019)
- Black Terror vol. 4 #1 (Dynamite, 2019)
- Archie 1955 #1 (Archie Comics, 2019)
- Stranger Things: Halloween Special one-shot (Dark Horse, 2020)

== Awards ==
- 2012: Won "Favourite Newcomer Artist" Eagle Award
- 2012: Won "Best Cover Artist" Eisner Award
- 2015: Nominated "Best Cover Artist" Eisner Award
- 2016: Nominated "All-in-One Award" Inkwell Awards
