= Echoes (comics) =

American five-issue comic book limited series

- Cover to Echoes issue 1 (art by Rahson Ekedal)

Publication information
- Publisher: Top Cow
- Schedule: Monthly
- Format: Limited series
- Genre: Horror
- Publication date: December 2010 – April 2011
- No. of issues: 5
- Main character: Brian Cohn

Creative team
- Created by: Joshua Hale Fialkov
- Written by: Joshua Hale Fialkov
- Artist: Rahson Ekedal
- Letterer: Troy Peteri

Collected editions
- Echoes vol 1 HC: ISBN 978-1-60706-215-8

Echoes is an American five-issue comic book limited series written by Joshua Hale Fialkov and drawn by Rahsan Ekedal. Published by Top Cow Productions, it tells the story of Brian Cohn, a man with schizophrenia who learns his father may have been a serial killer. The first issue was released on December 29, 2010.

== Publication history ==
Joshua Hale Fialkov and Rahsan Ekedal first worked together in 2008 on The Cleaners, a horror comic book series for the publisher Dark Horse Comics. Fialkov brought the story to Ekedal in its early stages, and Ekedal provided some concept art to accompany the pitch. After being accepted by Top Cow, Fialkov crafted the story mostly by himself, although he did adapt the script to Ekedal's style.

The art in Echoes is completely black and white, which was more affordable for the artists, but also because Failkov felt grayscale was more effective. The artistic style was inspired by the Warren Publishing horror comic books Creepy and Eerie from the 1960s and 1970s, which both Fialkov and Ekedal enjoyed. Ekedal said of the artistic style: "A lot of the look developed out of my attempts to visually represent what it means to suffer from a serious mental disorder. So I tried to put Brian's doubts and terrors into every shadow, every line."

Fialkov said the idea of a suburban setting with an ordinary-seeming killer was conceived because its "so much scarier and so much more upsetting" than an urban setting. The idea of the dolls made from victims' flesh came from Fialkov's research about voodoo, as well as his own interest in cults and secret societies. Fialkov also said Echoes was partially inspired by the 1960 horror film Psycho, directed by Alfred Hitchcock, because he felt both stories were driven by the characters and drama rather than the horror. Fialkov described the series as "achingly dark", and said of writing it: "I haven't really done a hard horror book in a long time. It was a lot of fun to actually do something that's just grotesque and upsetting."

The first issue was included in the September 2010 release of Top Cow First Look, a trade paperback highlighting several of the publisher's new releases. The first issue was officially released on December 29, 2010. Ekedal said the book's reception far exceeded his expectations, with four Harvey Award nominations and fans asking him about it more than two years after its completion.

The series was collected into a single hardcover volume in July 2011. A signed set of all five issues (second printing of issue 1) was made available in January 2012. Ekedal struggled to complete his portion of the signatures due to a wrist injury.

Fialkov hinted at the possibility of a sequel in the letter column of issue five. In a 2012 interview, Ekedal said it could happen if the hardcover continued to sell, but no project had been started.

== Plot ==
Brian Cohn, who is medicated for his schizophrenia, visits his dying father (who also has schizophrenia and has Alzheimer's disease) in a hospital. With his final breaths, he tells Brian an address and speaks cryptically about dead girls. Brian investigates the house and discovers a large pile of human bones and a box filled with small dolls made from flesh.

Unsure what to do, Brian takes the box back to his home and tells no one. The stress of this discovery aggravates Brian's condition, and he begins to hear voices and hallucinate dead girls. In particular, he hears his father telling him to continue his work. When a young girl Brian sees disappears, he worries that he killed her. When Detective Neville visits Brian to inquire about the girl, Brian lies about seeing another man following her. Later, Brian receives a small package that contains a new doll made from the missing girl.

Detective Neville returns and invites Brian to accompany him to arrest a disabled man matching the description Brian had given. The man happens to have an alibi, but Brian's condition is further aggravated by the stress. After Neville leaves, Brian finds a girl's sneaker under his car's passenger seat.

Brian learns of the Alzheimer's symptom Echolalia, and returns to the hospital to research his father's roommate. The roommate used to live in the house in which Brian found the dolls, and the confession Brian's father made was a repetition of the confession his roommate had made to his son, Det Neville.

Brian is arrested for the girl's murder, and he is ignored when he tries to implicate Neville. Privately, Neville explains that he was present when Brian found the box and had been hoping they could work together. Brian is committed to a mental institution. As he lies strapped to a bed, a vision of his father leans over him promising to help him escape.

== Critical reception ==
The series received mostly positive reviews. Greg Burgas of Comic Book Resources praised the series, writing that Fialkov did an excellent job in building tension, and praising Ekedal's black and white art, which he said made the already-dark story feel even more morally ambiguous. Burgas wrote in a December 2010 review: "I really can't recommend Echoes enough. ... It's an early contender for best mini-series of 2011."

After being nominated for 3 Harvey Awards in 2011, Echoes was nominated for another four in 2012: Best graphic album previously published, Best continuing or limited series, Best Writer, and Best single issue or story (issue 5).

== Collected editions ==
The series was collected into a hardcover edition.

- Echoes Vol 1 (114 pages, July 2011, ISBN 978-1-60706-215-8)

== See also ==
- Elk's Run
- I, Vampire
- The Last of the Greats
