= Craig Rousseau =

American comic book writer

- Rousseau at GalaxyCon St Louis in 2026
- Born: April 26, 1971 (age 55)
- Areas: Penciller, Inker
- Notable works: Perhapanauts

Craig Rousseau is an American comic book artist.

During his career, Rousseau has worked for various comic book companies, but is best known for his work on DC Comics titles like Harley Quinn, Batman Beyond and Impulse. He also worked for Disney Adventures (Kim Possible), Beckett (Ruule: Kiss and Tell, Ronin Hood of the 47 Samurai, The Cobbler’s Monster), Image Comics (Tellos: The Last Heist, Tales of Tellos, Invincible Handbook, Monster Pile-up) and Marvel Comics' Creative Services.

He has additionally drawn, and co-created with Todd DeZago, The Perhapanauts for Dark Horse and Image Comics (Perhapanauts: First Blood and Perhapanauts: Second Chances). He worked on Spider-Man Loves Mary Jane for Marvel Comics.

== Career ==
=== Early career ===
Growing up, Craig Rousseau never saw comic books as a viable career option, instead wanting to explore a career as a commercial artist. "(I) wasn't planning on doing comics for a living. I grew up reading comics with a few of my good friends and never outgrew them. I always wanted to get into the art field and my parents were very supportive of that."

Rousseau began in comics in the mid-1990s while he was graduating from college with a double major in Painting/Illustration. His initial plan was to do freelance illustration and not comics. However, he was hired to work at Marvel's Creative Service Department designing POGS and children's books and soon began illustrating comic books.

Rousseau's influences are varied. In a 1998 interview, he stated, "There are lots of guys whose work I like and try to take something from and use it in my own way - Art Adams, Mike Mignola, Walt Simonson, Teddy Kristianson, Mike Weiringo, and lots more." He has also drawn from non-comic book artists and has cited artists such as Norman Rockwell, NC Wyeth, Aubrey Beardsley, Egon Schiele and Mucha as being strong influences on his work.

=== 1990s ===
After sending his portfolio to various editors, Rousseau was hired by DC and assigned the book Impulse. "...after sending samples everywhere," says Rousseau, "I got a fill-in issue of IMPULSE (22) and was asked to do 21 as well...next thing I knew, I had a full-time gig (which surprised me, 'cause those books looked TERRIBLE)!" He spent the bulk of the 1990s at DC and soon became the regular artist on Impulse from issue #27 and remained until issue #48. He returned for fill-in issues after that.

After Impulse, DC assigned him as the semi-regular artist on Batman Beyond and Harley Quinn. He also worked on titles such as Young Justice and Batman titles, Gotham Adventures and Detective Comics.

=== 2000s ===
In 2001, Rousseau began work at Image Comics by drawing Tellos: The Last Heist, when he was paired with legendary inker Terry Austin. During this time, he branched out and worked for companies such as Beckett (Ronin Hood of the 47 Samurai) and Portal Productions Studio (Bots!!). He also began work at Marvel, illustrating an issue of X-Men: First Class, and Marvel Adventures Super Heroes. He also returned to DC to illustrate their children's safety book, Energy & Safety Adventures with the JLA. In 2008 he was the regular artist on the second series of Marvel's Spider-Man Loves Mary Jane, a job that he relished for its change of pace. In a 2017 interview he stated, "It's a breath of fresh air since it's not so much costumes and superheroes. It's a lot of acting and facial expressions which can be a lot of fun. I'm at the point now where issue five is wrapping up and I'm going on to more mainstream superhero stuff, so it'll be nice to do more fight scenes and stuff like that. But the teenage girl stuff has been kinda fun."

=== Perhapanauts ===
In 2001 Rousseau helped develop and co-create the series Perhapanauts with writer Todd DeZago. Rousseau and DeZago had previously worked together on DC's Impulse title and DeZago pitched the initial idea for Perhapanauts. "When I first pitched The Perhapanauts to Craig," says DeZago, "I think I told him that it would be part X-Files, part Mission: Impossible, and part Archie comic. (I had imagined that it would be a Saturday morning cartoon of a comic book; a spooky Scooby-Doo-type adventure, and then a few pages of Archie-like jokes and gags.) As the first issues unfolded, however, with our concept still fairly ambiguous, we found that it was developing its own voice, its own 'flavor', and, like parents with a young child, we let it go and discover its own identity." Together the duo took the concept to Dark Horse Comics where a mini-series was published, after which DeZago and Rousseau moved to Image Comics. The reasons for the move included a perception of apathy for the series on the part of Dark Horse. "Craig and I were feeling zero love from Dark Horse," said DeZago, "They did nothing at all to promote our second series, Second Chances, when it came out and were very slow at getting back to us with any sales or financial information. People would come up to our table and claim that they had never even heard of the book. Craig and I would go to shows/conventions and find that Dark Horse didn’t even have our book at their booth!" Once the title had moved from Dark Horse, Image Comics subsequently discarded the mini-series concept and relaunched the title as an ongoing series and it now appears as a quarterly title.

Rousseau has stated his admiration for both writer DeZago and the series on more than one occasion. "We share the same sensibilities and wanted to do something that we wanted to read--crypto-zoological creatures, action, adventure, humor. The stories and characters have taken turns we hadn't planned on, and honestly, that's some of the fun of working on the book."

=== Further career ===
Rousseau remains active in comic books and also produces commissions when available. His recent comic book work includes a four-part Marvel Comics series titled Iron Man and the Armor Wars, which Marvel has described as being, "Cash, cars, boats, houses...Tony Stark has got it all. The only thing that could ruin his day? If every single one of his IRON MAN armors were stolen, and then turned against him. Join us for a nail-biting, strapped-to-your-seat adventure as Tony battles his greatest creations, and tries to discover who could (gasp) OUTSMART him!?!? In 2010, Rousseau was announced as the artist for a new Marvel title focusing on an all-female team, Marvel Her-Oes.

== Bibliography ==
- The Perhapanauts (with Todd DeZago, Dark Horse Comics, Image Comics, 2005-)
- Marvel Her-Oes (with Grace Randolph, Marvel Comics, forthcoming)
