= Resetar =

Rešetar, Rešetár, Resetar or Reshetar may refer to:

- Dominik Rešetar (born 2000), Croatian footballer
- Eric Resetar (1928–2011), New Zealand cartoonist
- Lukáš Rešetár (born 1984), Czech futsal player
- Milan Rešetar (1860–1942), Serb-Croatian linguist
