= Elk's Run =

- Elk's Run #1 (March 2005), art by Datsun Tran.

Publication information
- Publisher: Hoarse and Buggy; Speakeasy Comics
- Format: Limited series
- Genre: Thriller
- Publication date: March – December 2005
- No. of issues: 8

Creative team
- Written by: Joshua Hale Fialkov
- Artist(s): Noel Tuazon
- Letterer(s): Jason Hanley
- Colorist(s): Scott A. Keating
- Editor(s): Jason Rodriguez

Collected editions
- Villard Books: ISBN 978-0-345-49511-2
- Oni Press: ISBN 978-1-620-10279-4

Elk's Run is an eight-issue limited comic book series created by writer Joshua Hale Fialkov, artist Noel Tuazon, and colorist Scott A. Keating, featuring covers by Datsun Tran.

== Publication history ==
The first three issues of the series were published by Joshua Fialkov's Hoarse and Buggy Productions, which had earlier begun publishing the five issue anthology series Western Tales of Terror (2004–2005). The first issue (which featured an eight-page backup story, "The Generic Monsters in: Where Werewolf?", by Fialkov and artist Nate Bellegrade) had a print run of only eight-hundred copies, making it difficult to find despite positive reviews. The series was then picked up by Canadian publisher Speakeasy Comics, which released a "Bumper Edition" in October 2005, collecting the first three issues and featuring a new cover by Darwyn Cooke. This was followed by an individual fourth issue in December 2005, but Speakeasy became defunct in February 2006, resulting in the cancellation of the remaining four issues.

In 2006, the Villard Books imprint of Random House collected all eight chapters of the series in trade paperback form. The collection, simply titled Elk's Run, was released in March 2007 with an introduction by Charlie Huston. In 2015, all eight issues were released digitally by Oni Press on a weekly schedule, beginning on 25 August, leading up the release of a new hardcover collected edition on 11 November, with an introduction by Ian Rankin.

== Reception ==
Elk's Run was generally reviewed positively, with the second issue "Community Bulletin" section featuring positive quotes from Warren Ellis, Brian Michael Bendis, and Brian K. Vaughan. Entertainment Weekly gave the first issue a rating of "A", while Variety gave it an "A-". Publishers Weekly was critical to the story's simplistic characterization, but also said that "Fialkov builds the suspense incrementally until the cycle of violence became a wave of disasters". The horror magazine Rue Morgue gave the series a glowing review:

Elk's Run is easiest described as Steven King's The Body (a.k.a. Stand by Me) crossed with M. Night Shyamalan's The Village, but comic's best kept secret is actually a great deal more. Five issues deep, this series just effortlessly generates momentum — a stunning achievement.

Based on the first four issues, the series was nominated for the 2006 Harvey Awards in the categories of Best Writer, Best Artist, Best Letterer, Best Cover Artist, Best New Talent, and Best Continuing or Limited Series, while issue #3 was nominated for Best Single Issue or Story.

== See also ==
- Echoes
- I, Vampire
- The Last of the Greats
