= The Sensational Spider-Man =

Comic book series

- The Sensational Spider-Man #0, featuring Ben Reilly as Spider-Man.

Publication information
- Publisher: Marvel Comics
- Schedule: monthly
- Format: ongoing
- Publication date: January 1996 – November 1998
- No. of issues: 35 (#0–33, #−1)
- Main character: Spider-Man

Creative team
- Written by: Dan Jurgens, issues 0–6; Todd DeZago, issues 7–33
- Penciller(s): Dan Jurgens; Klaus Janson; Mike Wieringo

The Sensational Spider-Man is an American comic book series starring Spider-Man published by Marvel Comics for 35 issues (#0–33, with #−1 published in July 1997 between #17 and 18), from January 1996 until November 1998.

== Publication history ==
The Sensational Spider-Man title was first used for various reprints, including Marvel Treasury Edition #14 (1977), 22 (1979) and 27 (1980) which featured various reprints from Marvel Team-Up and The Amazing Spider-Man, a trade paperback in 1988 featuring Frank Miller's Spider-Man work, and a prestige format one-shot special called The Sensational Spider-Man: Nothing Can Stop the Juggernaut (ISBN 0-87135-572-8) in 1989, which reprinted The Amazing Spider-Man #229 and 230.

The ongoing The Sensational Spider-Man series was conceived to be the flagship showcase for the new Ben Reilly version of Spider-Man. It replaced the Web of Spider-Man series.

The initial seven issues (#0–6, January–July 1996) were written and pencilled by Dan Jurgens, who had helped revive interest in Superman for DC Comics in the mid-1990s. Jurgens pushed strongly for the restoration of Peter Parker as the true Spider-Man and plans were made to enact this soon, but Bob Harras, the new Editor-in-Chief, demanded the story be deferred until after the Onslaught crossover. Jurgens had by this stage become disillusioned with the immense amount of group planning and constant changes of ideas and directions. He took this as the last straw, resigning from the title.

He was succeeded by writer Todd DeZago and penciller Mike Wieringo, who remained as the title's regular creative team for the remainder of its run. It lasted for 35 issues (33 regularly numbered issues, as well as an initial issue #0 and the #−1 Flashback issue, released mid-run).

In February 2006, with issue #23, the series Marvel Knights Spider-Man was moved from the Marvel Knights imprint and renamed The Sensational Spider-Man (vol. 2).

== Collections ==
- Spider-Man: The Complete Ben Reilly Epic Book 1 (#0)
- Spider-Man: The Complete Ben Reilly Epic Book 2 (#1)
- Spider-Man: The Complete Ben Reilly Epic Book 3 (#2–3)
- Spider-Man: Ben Reilly Omnibus Vol. 1 (#0-3)
- Spider-Man: The Complete Ben Reilly Epic Book 4 (#4–6)
- Spider-Man: The Complete Ben Reilly Epic Book 5 (#7–10)
- Spider-Man: The Complete Ben Reilly Epic Book 6 (#11)
- X-Men: The Complete Onslaught Epic Vol. 2 (#8)
- Spider-Man: Revelations (#11)
- Spider-Man: Ben Reilly Omnibus Vol. 2 (#4-11)
- Spider-Man: Savage Land (cover-titled "The Savage Land Saga!") TP (1997) (#13-15)
- Spider-Man by Todd DeZago & Mike Wieringo Vol. 1 (#7-24, -1) (2017) (ISBN 978-1302-90699-3, 456 pages)
- Spider-Man: Spider-Hunt (#25–26)
- Spider-Man: Identity Crisis (#27–28)
- Spider-Man: The Gathering of Five (#32–33)

== Sources ==
- The Grand Comics Database
- The Unofficial Handbook of Marvel Comics Creators
