= Joshua Hale Fialkov =

American comic book writer

- Born: August 19, 1979 (age 47) Sacramento, CA
- Area: Writer
- Notable works: Echoes, Elk's Run, I Vampire, Infected, The Bunker, The Life After

Joshua Hale Fialkov (born August 19, 1979) is an American comic book writer who primarily works in the horror genre. He is best known for Echoes, The Bunker, Elk's Run, I, Vampire, and the 2008 film Infected. He has been nominated for multiple Harvey Awards.

== Early life ==
Fialkov was born in Sacramento, California, on 19 August 1979, but raised in Pittsburgh, Pennsylvania. He attended college at Emerson in Boston, Massachusetts, where he received a B.F.A. in writing and directing. After working in film in Boston, he moved to Los Angeles in 2001.

== Career ==
In 2007, he was a winner in the first Pilot Season comics competition with Cyblade, and returned for the fifth season in 2011 with The Test.

In late 2013, Fialkov started to write a new webcomic series The Bunker with artist Joe Infurnari, which received positive reactions and was picked up by Oni Press to turn the series into a traditional printed format starting from February 2014. The publisher also picked up another pitch from Fialkov and a rookie artist Gabo, St. Jude and The Life After, which debuted in July 2014 as The Life After and was also critically praised. Following the breakthrough success of two independent series, because of the resulting increased workflow, his own illness in late July, and possibly low sales of the series itself, Fialkov dropped out of Ultimate FF, leaving the series cancelled midway through the current arc.

Outside the comics realm, in 2008, his success in comics led to his selection as lead writer and executive producer for the LG15: The Resistance web series, based on the lonelygirl15 franchise.

== Personal life ==
In an August 2014 question and answer thread on the website Reddit, Fialkov noted that he is an atheist.

== Bibliography ==
Title	Publisher	Collaborators	Award nominations
Elk's Run	Villard – March 27, 2007	Noel Tuazon (artist); Scott Keating (colorist)	Best Writer, Best Artist, Best Letterer, Best Cover Artist, Best New Talent, Best Continuing or Limited Series, and Best Single Issue or Story (2006 Harvey Awards)
Tumor	Archaia – Oct 7, 2009	Noel Tuazon	Eisner Award
Echoes	Top Cow – Dec 2010	Rahsan Ekedal	2011 Harvey Award: Best New Series; 2012 Harvey Awards: Best graphic album previously published, Best continuing or limited series, Best Writer, and Best single issue or story (issue 5).
I, Vampire	DC Comics – Sep 2011–Apr 2013	Andrea Sorrentino	
The Last of the Greats	Image Comics – Oct 2011–Feb 2012	Brent Peeples	
Doctor Who	IDW Publishing – Jan-Apr 2012	Matthew Dow Smith	
Ultimate Comics: Ultimates	Marvel Comics – June–September 2013	Carmine Di Giandomenico	
Ultimate FF	Marvel Comics – April 2013-July 2014	Mario Guevara	
The Devilers	Dynamite Comics – July 2014-January 2015	Matt Triano	
The Bunker	Oni Comics – February 2014 – Present (Started as an independent webcomic in August 2013)	Joe Infurnari	
The Life After	Oni Comics – July 2014 – Present	Gabo	
