= Spider-Man and the Fantastic Four =

Comic book limited series

- Cover of Spider-Man and the Fantastic Four #1 (June 2007). Art by Mike Wieringo & Karl Kesel

Publication information
- Publisher: Marvel Comics
- Schedule: Monthly
- Format: Limited series
- Genre: Superhero; Crossover
- Publication date: May – August 2007
- No. of issues: 4

Creative team
- Written by: Jeff Parker
- Penciller: Mike Wieringo
- Inker: Wade von Grawbadger
- Colorist: Pete Pantazis

Spider-Man and the Fantastic Four is a four-issue comic book limited series published by Marvel Comics. It was published in May - August 2007, written by Jeff Parker and illustrated by Mike Wieringo shortly before his death.

== Plot ==
=== Issue One ===
On a routine night, Spider-Man comes across what appears to be the Silver Surfer, but in fact is the Impossible Man in disguise. The playful alien annoys Spider-Man with his antics until he remembers why he came to Earth; to warn the Fantastic Four of the incoming invasion from the alien race the H'Mojen. The warning comes too late, as the mothership has landed in Central Park and the Imperator is at work preparing for the invasion. The Imperator announces that Earth will be the 13,743 planet to be "H'Mojenized". Spider-Man and the Impossible Man try to stop him, but they are blasted by deadly repulsor rays, which leave Spider-Man unconscious and the Impossible Man seemingly destroyed.

The next morning, Spider-Man limps to the Baxter Building and informs the Human Torch and the Thing of the night's events. As Mister Fantastic and the Invisible Woman are on vacation with their children, the other two call to inform them to return home. Ben and Johnny then head to the Park to confront the Imperator. The alien proves able to counter their best attacks with a time-displacement field, and then activates his machinery, causing an eerie silver light to blanket the park.

=== Issue Two ===
Spider-Man swings home to change out of his damaged costume. As he converses with Mary Jane and Aunt May, they suddenly transform into silver-skinned aliens, telling Peter that merging with the H'Mojen is a positive step for humanity, and warning him not to fight it. Frustrated, sick to his stomach, but not merged for some reason, Spider-Man departs.

Meanwhile, Reed and Sue arrive at the park and find aliens overwhelming Ben and Johnny. When they try to fight them off, their teammates stop them, as the attackers are revealed to be citizens who have merged with the H'Mojen and embraced the experience. Racing home to check on their family, the Fantastic Four (with Spider-Man in tow) discover that Franklin, Valeria and Alicia Masters are unchanged. Reed deduces that if a person's DNA is sufficiently different from base humanity, the merging process does not work on them. A TV broadcast reveals that the superhumans who have merged (including Captain America and Iron Man) are subduing those who have not (such as Ms. Marvel and Luke Cage) and that these dissidents, as well as those with physical handicaps and other such abnormalities, are being placed into "aboriginal reservations" so as they will not interfere with the merge.

The group splits up to try to find some answers, all unsuccessfully. Johnny and Spider-Man travel to the Sanctum Sanctorum to find Doctor Strange and Wong have been merged with the H'Mojen, and Strange is now only able to perform card tricks (which to his own mind are astounding). Sue and Ben try to stop the Imperator, but are barely able to so much as stall the assimilation process. Reed runs several simulations on his computer, but cannot come up with a way to reverse the merge without killing both entities. When the heroes regroup, Reed declares that he will use an experimental shuttle to travel to other galaxies that have been previously merged with the H'Mojen to see how they have dealt with their new lives. He names Spider-Man as his replacement as he leaves. Shortly after, the remaining Four are confronted with the Imperator and the assimilated Governor of New York, who send three massive Triax creatures to stop their interference.

=== Issue Three ===
Ben, Johnny and Spider-Man fight off the Triax as Susan locks down the Baxter Building and studies the alien's progress. Seeing that the aliens are striking at Mount Wundagore, she realizes that the H'Mojen must consider the High Evolutionary's work to be a threat to their invasion. The Four head to Wundagore and help the Knights of Wundagore (who seem to be based on the Winnie-the-Pooh characters) protect their citadel. The Knights show them a device that the Evolutionary left behind to protect them. Spider-Man is unable to figure it out, so he controversially suggests that they seek the aid of Doctor Doom himself. Despite the reservations of his teammates, the Four set course for Latveria.

In the meanwhile, Reed has travelled to several planets, and has found that every planet merged with the H'Mojen has gradually lost its sense of cultural identity, and have unsuccessfully tried to rediscover themselves. He also finds that the only race who were able to stop the invasion did so at the cost of themselves and their entire planet. However, he discovers vital information about the Imperator that could be the key to stopping him.

Back on Earth, the Four find that Doom considers the Latverians who have merged with the aliens to be traitors, and is furiously attacking. He is of course even further infuriated when he sees the Fantastic Four, but Spider-Man cleverly appeals to Doom's vanity by claiming that Mister Fantastic was unable to figure out the device. Ever eager to prove his genius, Doom quickly figures out the device and creates a larger version that will blanket the entire hemisphere with rays to prevent the merging. Taking the original version to use as a weapon, the Four track the Imperator to the African Serengeti, where they save a group of men from being merged. The Imperator begins planning his countermeasure when Spider-Man, who has been growing steadily sicker through the course of the story, suddenly vomits up a cloud of purple plasma that seems to bear the Impossible Man's face.

=== Issue Four ===
The cloud of purple plasma Spider-Man vomited out is the entire Poppupian race, to which Impossible Man belongs. They have a hive mind and every DNA strand of this race is identical to each other, meaning the entire race is contained in a single cell. The Poppupians have rebuilt themselves from a single cell inside Spider-Man, developing into a huge blob.

Meanwhile, Reed returns from space, disrupting the Imperator's "time/space technology" and allowing the Thing to engage in a little clobbering time. The Imperator grafts various African animals together, creating monsters that fight Spider-Man and the Fantastic Four until the Poppupians make their appearance. They trash the Imperator and then announce that they will no longer contain themselves within one member of their race. Now they intend to take over the world.

As the H'Mojens arrive to attack the Poppupians, Reed reveals that the Imperator saved his world from colonization, by becoming the new Imperator and promising to find worlds for the H'Mojen. The Poppupians start to separate the H'Mojen from their hosts in a process that protects the humans but kills the H'Mojen. Reed convinces the Imperator to recall the H'Mojen into his ship to save their lives. The only option seems to be for the Imperator to take the H'Mojen back to his world to merge with his people but as the Poppupians plan to overrun Earth with "9 billion unique beings", Spider-Man gets an idea so the Imperator absorbs the Poppupians into his ship and takes them to an uninhabited planet Reed found. There they merge with the H'Mojen to "combine the most adaptable yet direction-less species in the galaxy with the growth-driven one unable to change on their own." This merge seems to please both races, the Imperator gets to retire and the H'Mojen/Poppupians build a huge stone bust of Spider-Man.

Back on Earth, as Peter and Mary Jane walk by, a cat hacks up a little piece of green glop that "pops" up into the Impossible Man.
