= The Black Beetle (Dark Horse Comics) =

Comic book series

- Cover to The Black Beetle #1 (art by Francesco Francavilla)

Publication information
- Publisher: Dark Horse Comics
- Schedule: Monthly
- Format: Ongoing series
- Genre: Superhero
- Publication date: December 2012
- No. of issues: 5

Creative team
- Created by: Francesco Francavilla
- Written by: Francesco Francavilla
- Artist: Francesco Francavilla
- Letterer: Nate Piekos
- Editor(s): Jim Gibbons (2012–2015); Scott Allie (2017)

Collected editions
- No Way Out: ISBN 9781616552022
- Kara Böcek: ISBN 9781506705378

The Black Beetle is a comic book series about a masked vigilante. It was created by Francesco Francavilla and published by Dark Horse Comics.

== Publishing History ==
=== Pulp Sunday ===
The first drawing of The Black Beetle

The Black Beetle made its first appearance on the forum drawingboard.org on the twelfth of January, 2006, as ten-minute doodle. In 2009, Francesco Francavilla held a poll on his blog, Pulp Sunday. He had decided to do a webcomic and asked readers whether they would rather Max Malone or The Black Beetle, described as "in the vein of masked vigilante pulp in some sort of '40s/'50s settings, with some slight (40s/50s) sci-fi tone to it". More than two-thirds of the readers voted for The Black Beetle. Shortly after, he came up with the setting of Colt City, his own mix between New York City and Gotham City.

==== No Way Out ====
On Sunday, May 17, 2009, The Black Beetle made its debut as the opening page of No Way Out (although at the time this title had not yet been announced). This first appearance ran for a total of ten pages, appearing on most Sundays until August 2, when it ended with The Black Beetle falling from a rooftop. These ten pages were billed as the first part of six. The pages were printed in The Black Beetle ashcan, which was first sold at HeroesCon 2009.

==== Kara Böcek ====
In December 2009 Francesco Francavilla attempted to tell a shorter Black Beetle story, a one-shot, roughly 20 pages, between his paid publishing work. This story was released in a landscape format. The plan was to update as frequently as possible, sometimes twice a week on Sundays and Wednesdays. Upon reaching the tenth page, Francavilla stated the comic was one-third finished. Page 11, which was supposed to be the first page of the middle third of the story, was the last completed page.

The Kara Böcek was mentioned in the Dark Horse printing of The Black Beetle #1: No Way Out (Part 1), and Francavilla said he intends to return to the story some day in the letters column of The Black Beetle #0: Night Shift.

=== Dark Horse Comics ===
==== Night Shift ====
In December 2011 Dark Horse announced The Black Beetle's debut in the pages of Dark Horse Presents. The story, Night Shift, was told in three eight-page parts in issues #11–13 (April–June, 2012). The story was later republished as The Black Beetle #0 in December 2012.

==== No Way Out ====
At a Dark Horse convention panel in July 2012, Francavilla announced that The Black Beetle had been picked up for its first miniseries, No Way Out, the story originally started on his Pulp Sunday blog. The series began its run in January, 2013. The first ten pages were from the original version of the story on Pulp Sunday, but recolored and with altered text and art.

In 2013, at the Emerald City Comicon, it was announced that The Black Beetle would continue at Dark Horse as an ongoing monthly series. This was later corrected by editor Jim Gibbons, who said the series was going to be "semi-monthly". Francavilla has further clarified, it will be an ongoing series of miniseries.

==== Kara Böcek ====
In 2016, The Black Beetle returned to Dark Horse Presents. The new story, Kara Böcek, was adapted from the version originally published on the Pulp Sunday blog. The story commenced in Dark Horse Presents #28 in November 2016. The story ran in five issues, ending with Dark Horse Presents #32 in March 2016.

==== Necrologue ====
Necrologue was initially announced as a five-issue miniseries to be released in 2013. However, no further issues were solicited after the fourth, and the title was removed from Dark Horse's publishing schedule.

== Publications ==
=== Issues ===
Issue	Title	Published	Story	Art	Colors	Cover	Notes
#0	Night Shift	December 19, 2012	Francesco Francavilla				
#1	No Way Out	January 16, 2013; 13 March 2013 (2nd printing)	Francesco Francavilla				This issue has three different covers: 1st print; 2nd print; Exclusive for ComicsPRO
#2	No Way Out	February 20, 2013	Francesco Francavilla				
#3	No Way Out	April 17, 2013	Francesco Francavilla				Originally scheduled for March 20.
#4	No Way Out	June 12, 2013	Francesco Francavilla				Originally scheduled for April 17.

=== Collections ===
Night Shift and No Way Out are collected in the first Black Beetle hardcover volume, published October 2013.

Volume	Title	Published	Collects	ISBN	Notes
1	No Way Out	October 16, 2013	The Black Beetle #0: Night Shift; The Black Beetle #1–4: No Way Out	9781616552022	Originally Scheduled for August 27, 2013
Kara Böcek		September 6, 2017	“Kara Böcek” from Dark Horse Presents #28–32	9781506705378	
