= The Last of the Greats =

Comic book limited series

- cover to issue #1

Publication information
- Publisher: Image Comics
- Schedule: Monthly
- Publication date: October 2011 – February 2012
- No. of issues: 5
- Main character: Last

Creative team
- Written by: Joshua Hale Fialkov
- Artist: Brent Peeples
- Colorist: Mirka Andolfo

The Last of the Greats was a comic book limited series created by writer Joshua Hale Fialkov and the artist Brent Peeples. It was published by Image Comics from October 5, 2011, to February 2012. A sequel, Return of the Greats, is forthcoming.

== Story ==
The last of the greats takes place in a world where seven alien super powered beings known as the Greats have eliminated disease, poverty and social inequality. At the start of the story, humanity found a way to kill all of the Greats save one, who kept himself hidden, never bothering to try to help Earth as his siblings did. Now humanity must plead with the last of the Greats to stop an alien invasion that threatens the entire world.

There are several startling revelations during the first five issues. It is revealed that though the Greats seemingly died, they are beings of energy and therefore have been absorbed by their remaining brother, who is now extorting the human race into complete subjugation for his help. When the Last Great seeks to engage the alien ships, he actually goes aboard one of them and seems to be in charge of the fleet, which he then orders to destroy two-thirds of the Earth's population. In flashbacks, it is seen that the Last Great's sister had a child with her adviser and the child has abilities like the other Greats, but she is being kept hidden from the Last Great for her own protection.

Later in the story, the Last Great is attacked by his "niece", and during the battle, the reader is given a glimpse of the other Greats in a big field under a tree that represents them being part of the Last Great's subconscious, mingling and talking with each other. Due to the Last Great's niece fighting with him, the internal struggle with the other Greats causes them to attempt to release themselves from his body. All of the Greats do this, except for one woman. The Last Great and this woman have plotted to have the others release themselves and float around as formless energy so that they can enact a master plan that they have been planning for some time.

== Collected editions ==
The first series was collected into a trade paperback:

- Volume 1 (collects Last of the Greats #1–5, Image Comics, paperback, March 2012, ISBN 978-1-60706-518-0)

== Reception ==
Jamil Scalese of Comics Bulletin called the story "page-turning, jaw-dropping" and wrote, "The Last of the Greats sets itself up to be one [of] the best mindfuck comics to hit shelves recently." He praised the artwork as well. IGN felt the series had a "neat concept" but complained about the lack of character development in the first issue.

== See also ==
- Elk's Run
- I, Vampire
- Echoes
