= Mike Wieringo =

American comic book artist (1963–2007)

- Born: Michael Lance Wieringo; June 24, 1963 Vicenza, Italy
- Died: August 12, 2007 (aged 44) Durham, North Carolina, U.S.
- Areas: Writer, Penciller, Inker
- Notable works: Fantastic Four; The Flash; Tellos

Michael Lance Wieringo (/wɪˈrɪŋɡoʊ/; June 24, 1963 – August 12, 2007), who sometimes signed his work under the name Ringo, was an American comics artist best known for his work on DC Comics' The Flash, Marvel Comics' Spider-Man and Fantastic Four, as well as his own creator-owned series, Tellos. In 2017, the Ringo Awards were created in honor of Wieringo. They are presented at the Baltimore Comic-Con to recognize achievement in the comics industry.

== Early life ==
Michael Lance Wieringo was born in Vicenza, Italy, on June 24, 1963 to Cecil E. and Shirley Dean Wieringo, who live in Lynchburg, Virginia. He had a brother named Matt.

Wieringo became interested in comics through his father, who was an avid reader. Wieringo began drawing comics when he was 11. He studied fashion illustration at Virginia Commonwealth University, though he began to consider drawing comics as a profession, and showed his artwork at comics convention during his college years. Soon after graduating, he determined that that field was "dying out". Realizing that he did not possess the fortitude for commercial illustration, he decided to draw comic books.

== Career ==
=== Early work ===
Wieringo's first professionally published work was Doc Savage: Doom Dynasty #1, published by Millennium Publications in 1991. Editor Mark Ellis had to overrule his partner to give the fledgling artist his first assignment.

Wieringo took his samples to the 1992 San Diego Comic Con, where he met DC Comics group editor of creative services Neil Pozner, who showed Wieringo's art to other DC editors. He was eventually given his first work for DC, a story in Justice League Quarterly #11. That was followed by a second JLQ in issue #12.

=== The Flash ===
The Flash vol. 2 #97 (Jan. 1995), with Bart Allen (Impulse) second from left. Cover by Wieringo

The Flash editor Brian Augustyn asked Wieringo to try out for The Flash. After submitting some sample pages of the Flash running, Wieringo was offered the penciling duties on Volume 2 of that series, on which he was paired with writer Mark Waid, and on which he rose to prominence in the industry, drawing all but two issues from #80–92 (Early Sept. 1993–July 1994), plus #0 (Oct. 1994). He additionally penciled covers through #100, #118–124, and 128–129, and for The Flash 80-Page Giant #2 (April 1999). Wieringo and Waid co-created the young speedster Bart Allen, a.k.a. Impulse, in The Flash vol. 2 #91 (cameo) and #92 (first full appearance).

Wieringo followed this with a short run on Robin, another DC title, with writer Chuck Dixon, while concurrently penciling Marvel Comics' Rogue #1–4 (Jan.–April 1995), a miniseries starring that X-Men superheroine. During this period, he also penciled occasional covers and small miscellaneous jobs for Marvel Comics. Wieringo explained, "I was fond, at the time, of jumping back and forth between Marvel and DC to work for both companies. There were lots of fun characters from both companies that I wanted to work on– and so when I was offered the Rogue miniseries, I jumped at the chance. I always wanted to work on an X-character or the X-Men in general. I also did an X-Force annual written by Fabian Nicieza during that time, but I wasn't offered any more X-related work after that. Perhaps Marvel thought that my artwork was too cartoony or something." Nonetheless, Wieringo found that his career profile was greatly increased by his having worked on an X-Men-related miniseries.

Other work around this time included penciling the cover and co-penciling (with Rob Haynes) the lead story of Firearm #0 (Nov. 1993) and penciling the back cover and one story in Godwheel #2 (Feb. 1995) for Malibu Comics. He penciled the cover of Explorers #2 (1995) for Explorer Press.

=== Marvel and Tellos ===
Promotional art for Tellos #1 (May 1999), by Wieringo

After having penciled the Spider-Boy #1 (April 1996) one-shot, which combined Spider-Man (Ben Reilly) and Superboy (Conner Kent) as part of the Marvel Comics–DC Comics intercompany crossover series of one-shots Amalgam Comics, Wieringo became the regular artist on Marvel's The Sensational Spider-Man, beginning with issue #8 (September 1996). Teaming with writer Todd Dezago, Wieringo penciled all but eight issues from #8–31 (September 1996 – October 1998), and some covers on issues he did not pencil. Additionally, Wieringo co-plotted several issues and penciled the quirkily numbered flashback issue, # −1 (July 1997). During his run he signed a two–year contract with Marvel, beginning December 1997.

After Spider-Man, Wieringo's next major project was at Image Comics, where he reteamed with Dezago on their creator-owned fantasy series Tellos. The comic, a coming-of-age adventure set in a magical, piratical world, ran 10 issues (May 1999–November 2000). The last three issues were released by Gorilla Comics, a short-lived Image imprint co-founded by Wieringo and several other creators in 2000. Following the demise of the series, Wieringo also penciled one 13–page story in a post-series one-shot, Tellos: Maiden Voyage #1 (March 2001).

Wieringo returned to DC Comics for all but one issue of The Adventures of Superman #592–600 (July 2001 – March 2002), with writer Joe Casey. He then returned to Marvel and reunited with writer Mark Waid on Fantastic Four. Beginning with #60 (October 2002), Wieringo eventually drew 27 issues of Waid's 37 issues, wrapping up their run with #524, by which time the previously relaunched series had returned to its original numbering. The comics-hobbyist webzine Newsarama commented that the Waid–Wieringo run "was perhaps best known for fan outcry when Marvel announced that [it was] going to replace the team. Marvel quickly reversed [its] decision, and the two completed their run on the series".

Wieringo penciled the interior art on issues #1–5 and #8–10 of Friendly Neighborhood Spider-Man and was the cover artist of #1–19 (December 2005 – June 2007). He and writer Jeff Parker began work on the miniseries Spider-Man and the Fantastic Four in April 2007.

== Style ==
Wieringo explained the philosophy behind his drawing style thus: "I just try to keep things fun. I like to do fun comics. It doesn't have to be realistic to be believable. In fact, I sometimes think that funny [material] might actually add something to certain books." When he began illustrating the Rogue miniseries, he was intimidated by the dark tone of that book's story, but once he finished the first issue, the editors decided to lighten up the "grim and gritty" tone of the story. Howard Mackie, who wrote Rogue, said he did not know who the artist on the series would be when he submitted the plot for the first issue. He also commented, "Weiringo's style is a little cartoony. Not cartoony in a childish way but more in the vein of John Byrne or someone with a more cleaner, open style."

== Personal life, death and legacy ==
On August 12, 2007, Wieringo died of an aortic dissection at his home in Durham, North Carolina, at age 44. He was survived by his parents, Cecil and Shirley Dean Wieringo, and his brother Matt.

Mirage Comics' Tales Of TMNT #40, Image Comics' Elephantmen #11 and The Walking Dead #42, and Marvel Comics' Spider-Man: Family #7 were dedicated to his memory.

At the time of his death, Wieringo had completed seven pages of a What If? story featuring the temporary "replacement" Fantastic Four of Spider-Man, Wolverine, the Hulk, and Ghost Rider that had originally been assembled in a 1990 three-part Fantastic Four storyline. Marvel Comics donated the script and Wieringo's art to The Hero Initiative, a charity dedicated to assisting Golden Age and Silver Age comics creators who retired without pensions or benefits and require financial assistance. Wieringo's colleagues stepped in to complete the story. The completed 48-page book, What If?—The Fantastic Four Tribute to Mike Wieringo, features, in addition to Wieringo's art, artwork by Arthur Adams, Paul Renaud, Stuart Immonen, Cully Hamner, Alan Davis, David Williams, Sanford Greene, Humberto Ramos, Skottie Young, Mike Allred, and Barry Kitson, and was released in June 2008.

In June 2017, the Baltimore Comic-Con announced the creation of the Mike Wieringo Comic Book Industry Awards (the "Ringo Awards"), to be held annually at Baltimore Comic-Con beginning in September 2017.

== Bibliography ==
=== DC Comics ===
- The Adventures of Superman #592-596, 598, 600 (2001-2002)
- Batman: Gotham Knights #24 ("Batman: Black and White" backup story, 2002)
- DC One Million 80-Page Giant #1 (among other artists, 1999)
- The Flash vol. 2 #80-83, 85-88, 90-92, 0 (1993-1994)
- Justice League Quarterly #11-12 (1993)
- Robin vol. 2 #19-22, 25-28, 31 (1995-1996)
- Superman vol. 2 #165 (among other artists, 2001)

=== Marvel Comics ===
- The Avengers #400 (1996)
- Fantastic Four #500, 509-513, 517-524 (2003-2005)
- Fantastic Four vol. 2 #13 (1997)
- Fantastic Four vol. 3 #60-64, 67-70 (2002-2003)
- Friendly Neighborhood Spider-Man #1-5, 8-10 (2005-2006)
- Ms. Marvel vol. 2 #9-10 (2007)
- Rogue #1-4 (1995)
- The Sensational Spider-Man #8-11, 13-17, 21-23, 27-28, 31, -1 (1996-1998)
- Spider-Man and the Fantastic Four #1-4 (2007)
- Stan Lee Meets... the Silver Surfer #1 (2007)
- X-Force Annual #3 (1994)
- X-Men vol. 2 #½ (1998)

=== DC Comics and Marvel Comics ===
- Spider-Boy #1 (1996)

=== Image Comics ===
- Gen¹³ Bootleg #13 (writer/artist, 1997)
- Tellos #1–10 (1999–2000)
- Tellos: Maiden Voyage #1 (2001)

=== Malibu Comics ===
- Firearm #0 (1993)
- Godwheel #2 (1995)

Preceded by Greg LaRocque	The Flash vol. 2 penciller 1993–1994	Succeeded by Salvador Larroca
Preceded by Keron Grant	Fantastic Four vol. 3 penciller 2002–2005	Succeeded by Tom Grummett
