= Todd Dezago =

American comic book writer

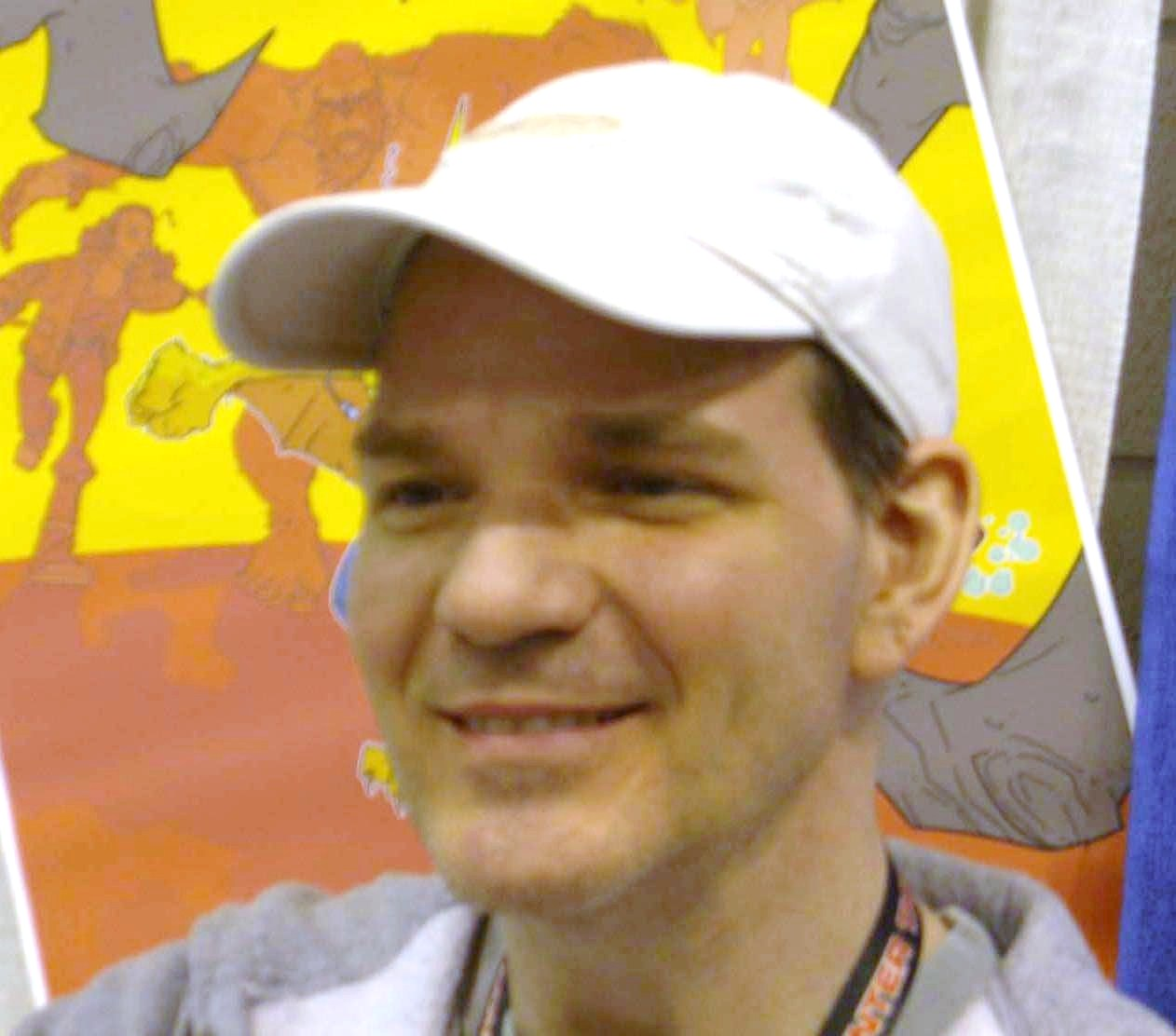
- Todd Dezago at the 2008 New York Comic Con
- Born: 1961 (age 64–65) Rhinebeck, New York, U.S.
- Area: Writer
- Notable works: Impulse; The Perhapanauts; The Sensational Spider-Man; Tellos; Young Justice

Todd Dezago (/dəˈzeɪɡoʊ/; born 1961) is an American comic book writer best known for his collaborations with artist Mike Wieringo on The Sensational Spider-Man and their creator-owned fantasy series Tellos.

== Early life ==
Todd Dezago was raised in Rhinebeck, New York and studied to be an actor.

== Career ==
Dezago began his comics writing career on X-Factor for Marvel Comics in 1994. He first worked with penciller Mike Wieringo on The Sensational Spider-Man #8 (Sept. 1996). They then collaborated on the creator-owned fantasy series Tellos in 1999. The series, a coming-of-age adventure set in a magical, piratical world, ran 10 issues (May 1999–Nov. 2000). The last three issues were released by Gorilla Comics, a short-lived Image Comics imprint co-founded by Dezago and several other creators in 2000. Following the demise of Gorilla Comics, Dezago and Tellos returned to Image Comics with the oversized one-shots Tellos: Maiden Voyage #1 (2001), The Last Heist (2001), and Sons and Moons (2002). They were followed by the three-issue miniseries Tales of Tellos in 2004.

At DC Comics, Dezago co-created Young Justice with artist Todd Nauck in the 1998 one-shot Young Justice: The Secret. His other Young Justice work includes the 1998 miniseries JLA: World Without Grown-ups. From 1999 to 2002, he wrote Impulse #50–89. In 2005 he co-created The Perhapanauts with artist Craig Rousseau.

== Bibliography ==
=== Ardden Entertainment ===
- Casper and the Spectrals #1–3 (2009–2010)

=== CD Comics ===
- Occupational Hazards (among others) (2000)

=== Dark Horse Comics ===
- The Perhapanauts #1–4 (2005–2006)
- The Perhapanauts: Second Chances #1–4 (2006–2007)

=== DC Comics ===
- Batman: Gotham Knights #24 ("Batman Black and White" backup story) (2002)
- The Flash 80-Page Giant #1 (1998)
- Impulse #50–54, 56–59, 62–89 (1999–2002)
- JLA 80-Page Giant #1 (1998)
- JLA: World Without Grown-Ups #1–2 (1998)
- Legends of the DC Universe #40–41 (2001)
- Sins of Youth: The Secret/Deadboy #1 (2000)
- Tangent Comics/The Flash #1 (1997)
- Tangent Comics/The Trials of the Flash #1 (1998)
- Teen Titans vol. 2 #50 (2007)
- Young Justice #22 (2000)
- Young Justice: The Secret #1 (1998)

=== Dynamite Entertainment ===
- DF Premiere: Tellos Prologue #1 (1999)
- Dynamic Forces: Tellos Preview Book #1 (1999)

=== Image Comics ===
- Monster Pile-Up #1 (2008)
- The Perhapanauts vol. 2 #1–6 (2008–2009)
- The Perhapanauts Annual #1 (2008)
- The Perhapanauts: Danger Down Under #1–5 (2012–2013)
- Popgun #4 (2010)
- Section Zero #1 (Tellos backup story) (2000)
- Skullkickers #24 (2013)
- Tales of Tellos #1–3 (2004)
- Tellos #1–10 (1999–2000)
- Tellos Prelude #1 (1999)
- Tellos: The Joining #1 (1999)
- Tellos: The Last Heist #1 (2001)
- Tellos: Maiden Voyage #1 (2001)
- Tellos: Sons & Moons #1 (2002)

=== Marvel Comics ===
- The Amazing Spider-Man #404–405, 663 (1995, 2011)
- Bug #1 (1997)
- Cable vol. 2 #40–43 (1997)
- Daydreamers #1–3 (script) (1997)
- Doctor Strange, Sorcerer Supreme #83 (1995)
- Excalibur #82 (script) (1994)
- Free Comic Book Day 2010: Iron Man/Nova (backup story) (2010)
- Generation X #11–12, 15–16 (script) (1996)
- Ka-Zar: Sibling Rivalry #-1 (co-plotter, scripting assist) (1997)
- Marvel Adventures Spider-Man #45–48 (2009)
- Marvel Adventures Super Heroes #10 (2009)
- Marvel Age: Spider-Man #7–11, 15, 17–18 (2004–2005)
- Marvel Age Spider-Man Team-Up #1–5 (2004–2005)
- Marvel Super Hero Squad #1–12 (2010–2011)
- Marvel Super Hero Squad Spectacular #1 (2011)
- Marvel Super Hero Squad Online Game: Hero Up #1 (2011)
- Marvel Universe: The Avengers: Earth's Mightiest Heroes #10 (2013)
- Marvel Universe: Ultimate Spider-Man #8 (2012)
- Scarlet Spider #1–2 (script) (1995)
- The Sensational Spider-Man #7–33, -1 (1996–1998)
- The Spectacular Scarlet Spider #1–2 (1995)
- The Spectacular Spider-Man #216, 218–219 (script); #230–240 (1994, 1996)
- Spider-Man Family #7 (2008)
- Spider-Man Team-Up Special #1 (2005)
- Spider-Man: Maximum Clonage Alpha #1 (1995)
- Spider-Man: The Clone Journal #1 (1995)
- Spider-Man: The Jackal Files #1 (1995)
- Strong Guy Reborn #1 (1997)
- The Thing/She-Hulk: The Long Night #1 (2002)
- Web of Scarlet Spider #1–2 (script) (1995)
- Web of Spider-Man #121–122, 126–129 (1995)
- What If...? #90 (1996)
- Wolverine #129–131 (1998)
- Wolverine #900 (special) (2010)
- Wolverine: Killing Made Simple #1 (2008)
- X-Factor #103–111 (1994–1995)
- X-Force and Cable '95 #1 (backup story) (1995)
- X-Men #½ (1998)
- X-Men Unlimited #21 (1998)

=== Self-published ===
- The Bedlam Field Guide to Cryptozoology vol. 1–2 (2018, 2023)
- The Mike Wieringo Tellos Tribute vol.1–2 (2017)
- The Perhapanauts: Into Hollow Earth OGN (2016)

=== Sitcomics ===
- Startup Binge Book #3 (with Darin Henry) (2020)

| Preceded by J. M. DeMatteis | X-Factor writer 1994–1995 | Succeeded by John Francis Moore |
| Preceded by Dan Jurgens | The Sensational Spider-Man writer 1996–1998 | Succeeded by n/a |
| Preceded by Chris Claremont | Wolverine vol. 2 writer 1998 | Succeeded by Erik Larsen |
| Preceded by William Messner-Loebs | Impulse writer 1999–2002 | Succeeded by n/a |
