= The Bunker (comics) =

Comic book

Publication information
- Publisher: Oni Press
- Format: Ongoing series
- No. of issues: 19

Creative team
- Written by: Josh Fialkov
- Artist: Joe Infurnari

The Bunker is a comic book written by Joshua Hale Fialkov with artwork by Joe Infurnari.

A pilot television episode was announced to have been written for Lionsgate TV. In 2019, it was reported that a television series is in the works at NBC.

== Plot ==
The world population is dying, and those responsible send a bunker back in time to warn their younger selves, in order to prevent it.

== Reception ==
It was highly recommended by Ain't It Cool News. Newsarama gave it a 9 out of 10. Bleeding Cool called it “A beautiful comic.” Comic Vine gave it 5 stars. Kotaku called it "a great, tense read with a killer twist ending that will have you aching for more."
