= Baltimore Comic-Con =

Comic book-oriented fan convention

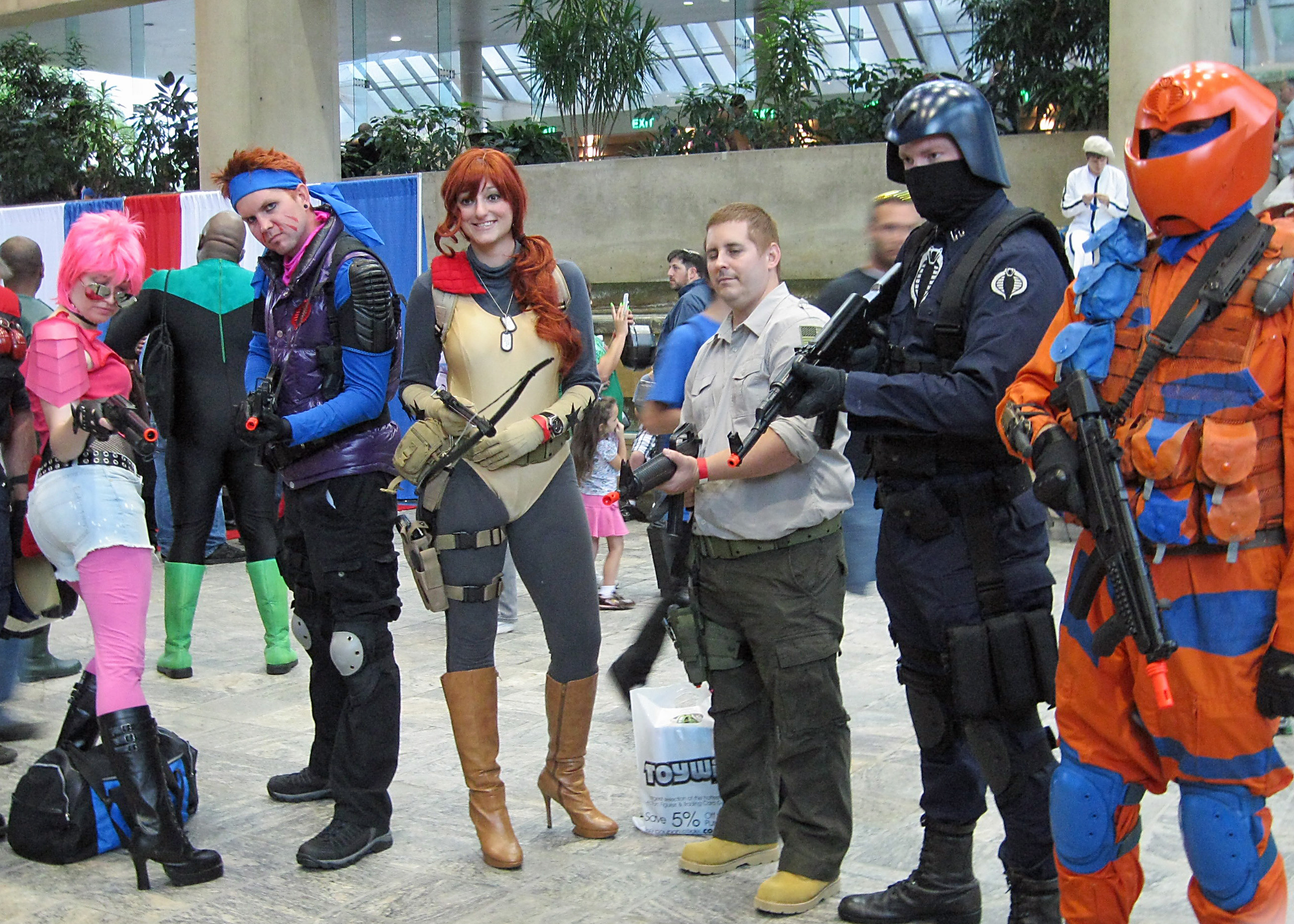
- Some people dressed as characters from G.I. Joe at Baltimore Comic-Con, held at the Baltimore Convention Center.
- Status: Active
- Genre: Comic
- Venue: Baltimore Convention Center
- Location: Baltimore, Maryland
- Country: United States
- Inaugurated: 2000; 26 years ago
- Attendance: 15,000+
- Organizer: Marc Nathan
- Website: Official website

The Baltimore Comic-Con is a comic book-oriented fan convention held annually in Baltimore since 2000.

Each year, the show features marquee-name comic book creators past and present, publishers, charitable organizations, and vendor booths offering genre-related items, including comic book back-issues, limited edition collectible items such as Toon Tumblers and clothing, videos/DVDs, etc. Panel discussions throughout the day feature industry names presenting information on current and upcoming industry events, past hallmarks in comic book history, and information on the industry and how to be a part of it.

== History ==
Founded by Marc Nathan, owner of Cards, Comics, and Collectibles of Reistertown, Maryland, the show was originally a one-day show held at the Sheraton Hotel in the Chartley Shopping Center, located in the Baltimore suburb of Towson, Maryland.

The show continued to grow in size, and in 2002, it show moved to the Baltimore Convention Center in downtown Baltimore, across from Camden Yards and down the street from Geppi's Entertainment Museum, and was extended to a two-day show. In 2014, responding to demand from attendees and exhibitors, the show moved to a three-day event, from September 5 to 7.

An annual Yearbook, featuring renderings by attending artists, became a part of the show in 2012, featuring Frank Cho's Liberty Meadows characters, followed by Stan Sakai's Usagi Yojimbo in 2013 and Matt Wagner's Grendel in 2014. A scavenger hunt is also associated with the Yearbook, where attendees who get a pre-defined number of contributor autographs receive prints that were not part of the book, featuring characters from that year's theme by other attending artists.

The 2020 Comic-Con was cancelled due to the COVID-19 pandemic and rescheduled for the same dates as a virtual event.

=== List of convention dates ===
- October 29, 2000
- October 28, 2001
- October 26 - 27, 2002
- September 20 - 21, 2003
- September 11 - 12, 2004
- September 17 - 18, 2005
- September 9 - 10, 2006
- September 8 - 9, 2007
- September 27 - 28, 2008
- October 10 - 11, 2009
- August 28 - 29, 2010
- August 20 - 21, 2011
- September 8 - 9, 2012
- September 7 - 8, 2013
- September 5 - 7, 2014
- September 25 - 27, 2015
- September 2 - 4, 2016
- September 22 - 24, 2017
- September 28 - 30, 2018
- October 18 - 20, 2019
- October 23 – 25, 2020 — cancelled due to COVID-19 pandemic; rescheduled as a virtual event
- October 22 – 24, 2021
- October 28 – 30, 2022
- September 8 – 10, 2023
- September 20 – 22, 2024
- October 17 – 19, 2025
- September 25 – 27, 2026

== Comics industry awards venue ==
In 2006, the 19th Annual Harvey Awards, named for comics creator Harvey Kurtzman, and developed to honor comic book industry professionals and companies singled out by their peers, moved from the Museum of Comic and Cartoon Art (MoCCA) in New York City to the Baltimore Comic-Con, with Kyle Baker as Master of Ceremonies. The Harvey Awards were held every year at the Baltimore Comic-Con from 2006 to 2016, when they moved to a new venue. (The Harvey Awards eventually found a new home at the New York Comic Con.)

At the Baltimore Comic-Con, the Harvey Awards were replaced with the creation of the Mike Wieringo Comic Book Industry Awards, or "Ringo Awards", beginning with the September 2017 convention.

== See also ==
- Fandom
- Science fiction convention
- Comic Art Convention
