= Tellos =

American fantasy comic book series

Publication information
- Publisher: Image Comics
- Genre: Fantasy
- Main character(s): Koj; Jarek; Serra

Creative team
- Written by: Todd Dezago
- Artist(s): Mike Wieringo
- Colorist(s): Paul Mounts; Ken Wolak

Cover art for Tellos Colossal HC (August 2007), by Mike Wieringo.

Tellos is a fantasy comic book series created by Todd Dezago and Mike Wieringo and published by Image Comics. Three issues at the end of the initial run were printed through Gorilla Comics, which was co-founded by Wieringo. After that company folded, the book returned to Image as a series of one-shots. Wieringo died in August 2007, leaving the future of the series in doubt.

== Plot ==
The series features a young boy named Jarek and his anthropomorphic tiger companion Koj. They encounter the swashbuckling pirate Serra, a fox thief named Rikk, his companion in crime Hawke, Brad the dragon, Tom a turtlish-wizard, and many other mysterious entities. The heroes strive to unravel the mystery behind Jarek's origin and escape the attentions of a mad boy-wizard named Malesur who is seemingly bent on Jarek's destruction.

Jarek has a powerful genie at his control, who is limited to defending Jarek only. Jarek tends to throw himself between his friends and danger so the genie is forced into battle.

The series features shadow-hopping ninja frogs as enemy cannon fodder. In fact, many of the citizens of this realm are anthropomorphic animals, though there are many others who are full-human, such as Hawke and Serra.

About midway through, the series takes a break from Koj and Jarek to focus on Hawke and Rikk in an adventure in a levitating city which is held down by chains.

The heroes band together to stop Malesur, the boy-wizard, once and for all. During the latter part of the series, Jarek suffers a severe injury, requiring him to wear an eyepatch for some time.

== Publication ==
The ongoing series was preceded with the publication of the "prologue", "prelude", and "preview" one-shots through Image and Dynamic Forces. The original series lasted 10 issues from 1999 to 2000, starting at Image Comics and later moving to Gorilla Comics.

== One-shots ==
Three oversized one-shots: Maiden Voyage, The Last Heist, and Sons and Moons, were released in 2001 through Image Comics. Each volume contained several stories written by Dezago and illustrated by various artists, some flashbacks and others taking place after the original series. The world and characters also appeared in an issue of The 10th Muse set during the original series.

A three-issue miniseries, Tales of Tellos, followed in 2004.

=== The Last Heist ===
This one-shot focuses on the continuing misadventures of Rikk and how the events of the main series continue to have long-lasting repercussions. The main focus is a magic mirror. Mirrors are rare enough as it is, but this one can keep an image reflected for as long as the user desires. Brad the dragon and a messenger pixie attempt to help out any way they can. In the end, the mirror is sent to Serra, back on her ship and lacking her sea-legs, who uses it in closure of some long-standing emotional issues.

The secondary story, which has Dava Hata on creative assistance, features Koj and Brad discussing the concept of 'destiny' and having their own adventures.
