= The Perhapanauts =

American comic book series (2005–)

- Cover to trade paperback edition of Perhapanauts: First Blood

Publication information
- Publisher: Dark Horse (2005); Image (2008)
- First appearance: First Blood #1 (November 2005)
- Created by: Todd Dezago; Craig Rousseau

In-story information
- Base(s): BEDLAM
- Member(s): Arisa; MG; Big; Molly; Choopie; Karl

The Perhapanauts is an American comic book series created by writer Todd Dezago and artist Craig Rousseau in 2005.

The first two mini-series, "First Blood" and "Second Chances", were published by Dark Horse Comics, but later in 2008, the Perhapanauts comics were published by Image Comics.

The Image Comics series began with an annual in February 2008, "Jersey Devil", followed by what may either be numerous then-upcoming mini-series or an ongoing series. The first series is "Triangle" taking the team into the Bermuda Triangle, which started publication in April 2008.

Besides their own title, the Perhapanauts appeared in 2008's Image Monster Pile-Up, a one-shot anthology comic that also featured The Astounding Wolf-Man, Proof, and Firebreather.

== Plot ==
The story follows a team of supernatural investigators (in that they both investigate the supernatural, and are supernatural beings who investigate) working for a top-secret government agency called BEDLAM, the Bureau of Extra-Dimensional Liability And Management. The organization is dedicated to finding strange and frightening creatures that have traveled to Earth via areas where the fabric of reality has worn thin and sending them back to where they came from. The main focus is on Blue Team, a special unit of BEDLAM operatives.

The members of Blue Team are Arisa Hines, the group's young black leader whose paranormal powers include telepathy and telekinesis; Big, a super-strong Sasquatch whose intelligence has been artificially evolved to genius level; Choopie, a feisty Chupacabra with the personality of a six year old boy; MG, a mysterious man in dark glasses who appears human but possesses otherworldly knowledge and the ability to "slide" between dimensions; and Molly MacAllistar, a teenage ghost who is still getting used to being dead.

Other characters in the series include Joann DeFile, housewife turned BEDLAM's Resident Psychic Advisor and self-appointed "den mother"; Peter Hammerskold, a former Marine with the ability to "read" the history of anything he touches who is the leader of BEDLAM's Red Team and sees Blue Team as rivals; the Merrow, a fairy-winged Irish water-sprite with elemental powers who is part of Red Team; and Karl, a lonely, goodhearted Mothman exiled by his fellow time-traveling harbingers of doom who wants to be a full-time member of Blue Team but is kept back as a BEDLAM reservist due to his clumsiness and barely controlled ability to broadcast waves of hallucination-inducing fear when he feels threatened.

Although their recurring arch-foe is the ancient shapeshifter Chimaera, who has proven extremely difficult to contain or destroy, Blue Team has also fought the Jersey Devil, sharp-tongued Filipino vampire the Aswang, and Karl's own clan, who want to prevent him from using his ability to navigate the nexus of space and time and all possible realities, known as Par-Ha ("The Perhaps"), to aid in BEDLAM missions.

== Collected editions ==
The series have been collected into trade paperbacks:

- First Blood (128 pages, Dark Horse, September 2006, ISBN 1-59307-607-X)
- Second Chances (128 pages, Dark Horse, June 2007, ISBN 1-59307-797-1)
- Triangle (Image, 2009, ISBN 978-1-60706-016-1)
- Dark Days (Image, 2010, ISBN 978-1607063124)
- Treasure Obscura (Image, 2012, ISBN 978-1607066583)
- Danger Down Under! (Image, 2014, ISBN 978-1-60706-849-5)

A Kickstarter campaign was organized in 2015 to allow the creators to publish a new graphic novel. The resulting "Into Hollow Earth", a 64-page hardcover story, was released in January 2016 to backers who pledged within a sufficient crowdfunding tier. It has since been made available for purchase through the store of the official Perhapanauts website.

== See also ==
- Proof, an ongoing series about a Bigfoot who hunts other cryptids for a clandestine government group
- Creature Commandos, a DC Comics team made up of World War II soldiers turned into classic movie monsters
- Nick Fury's Howling Commandos, a Marvel Comics team made up of monsters
