= Nordguard =

American graphic novel trilogy

The cover page to the first volume of the Nordguard trilogy, published in 2011 by Sofawolf Press, and featuring Pi, the lead dog, as well as her point dog and second-in-command, London.

Nordguard is an American graphic novel trilogy created by Tess Garman and Teagan Gavet and published by Sofawolf Press, starring anthropomorphic animal characters. The first Issue, Across Thin Ice, was released in 2011. As of 2015, a second issue Under Dark Skies was thought to be in development, however the official website no longer exists, which means that the continuation of the series is extremely unlikely. The series has an official tabletop game, Nordguard: The Card Game.

== Plot ==
The adventure story takes place in an early 20th century alternate North America, in a desolate Arctic frontier known as the Northern Territory. It is a world inhabited by anthropomorphic animals instead of humans. The plot focuses on a sled dog team, led by a Border Collie named Pi, of the Nordguard Elite, which is a search and recovery organization responsible for cutting trails, carrying the mail, and rescuing lost travelers.

== Characters ==
=== Pi ===
The lead sled dog of her team, Pi is only her nickname, her real name is thus far unknown. Pi is extremely ambitious, courageous, and clever, and is a natural born leader well respected by everyone on her team, especially London, who may have a crush on her. She was born and raised down south in the farming country of the Midwest, and her father was a reputed lawman of the West, who, after retiring, taught her to shoot. Her ambitious nature eventually led her to the last unconquered frontier of the North, where she seems right at home.

=== London ===
London is the point dog and second in command of Pi's team. Out of everyone on the team, London is the most mature, serious-minded, and logical, who rarely speaks unless he has something important to say. First a guide, and then a teacher, London has been with the Nordguard for more than a decade, but perhaps due to his overly-cautious nature, has never been offered to lead his own team. However, he does not seem angered about this, and instead seems to trust and care more about Pi's safety and well-being, occasionally to her annoyance.

=== Nickel ===
Nick for short, is the team's scout, as well as the youngest and newest addition to the team. He has a very adventurous and clever spirit and also provides most of the comic relief, possessing a very witty and snarky attitude as well as a penchant for storytelling. Before running away and coming up North in search of adventure, Nickel lived a very stuffy, privileged, high society life which he mostly loathed.

=== Geri ===
Geri is the twin brother of Freki, and like her, serves as a wheel dog on Pi's team. He's rather brutish, simple, and despite having a large appetite and short temper, is very loyal to both his sister and Pi, willing to risk his life to protect either. He and Freki were born and raised in the harsh land of Thule to the Northeast of the Northern Territory, and he, like his sister, never speak of their past and how or why they left Thule.

=== Freki ===
The twin sister of Geri, and like him, serves as a wheel dog on Pi's team. Unlike her more simple-minded brother, Freki is considerably more attentive and intelligent, but perhaps just as quiet and mysterious. She considers Pi her equal rather than a superior.

=== Lt. James McKay ===
Though not an official member of Pi's team, he is a supporting character in Across Thin Ice and Under Dark Skies, and serves as a medic on the team. He is generally kindhearted and well-meaning, but also very sensitive and naive, not fully at home in the arctic wastes. He is a teetotaler and does not drink, due to his abusive drunkard dad who died of alcohol poisoning when he was just a pup.

=== Oleg Kutakov ===
A Russian boar who serves as a ranking corps member. He is very stubborn, brash, and enjoys alcohol. In the first volume, Oleg, perhaps unwittingly, hints that he may possess more information regarding the situation at Tartok Mine than he is willing to reveal to the rest of the team, giving him the most secretive and insidious agenda out of all of the main characters.

== Nordguard: The Card Game ==
Released in 2012, Nordguard: The Card Game is a cooperative map-building card game with role-playing game elements. It features new artwork from Tess Garman and Teagan Gavet, as well as art provided by Chromamancer. It was created by Tempe O'Kun and developed by ThinkTank Games.

In the game, a team of players must work together to cross a random-generated map, with each of the seven main characters from the graphic novel having different abilities. Various promotional cards have been given out at furry conventions since its premiere, adding further characters, items, events, and locations. As of Anthrocon 2014, new promotional cards were still being released.

== Reception ==
Critical reception of the Nordguard series has largely been positive, with many reviewers particularly praising the series beautifully detailed art.

Jim DeVries of IGN rated Across Thin Ice 8.0 out of 10, signifying "Great." He calls it "exciting, funny, and one of the best drawn Indie books I've ever seen." At Flayrah, Fred Patten called it a "very satisfactory first installment of a tense thriller which is bound to enhance Garman's and Gavet's already stellar reputation. Shaun Nordin, columnist for Malaysian tabloid The Star, praised the book for its artwork and story.

== Awards ==
Nordguard: Across Thin Ice was nominated for the 2012 Russ Manning Most Promising Newcomer Award, a category within the Eisner Awards. It also won the 2011 Ursa Major Award for Anthropomorphic Other Literary Work and for Best Anthropomorphic Published Illustration.

Nordguard: The Card Game, designed by Tempe O'Kun and developed by ThinkTank Games, was nominated for the Ursa Major Award for Best Anthropomorphic Game of 2012.
