= All Star Comics Melbourne =

Australian comic book store

Coordinates: 37.817602°S 144.961712°E

- Founded: Melbourne, Australia (2011)
- Founder: Mitchell Davies & Troy Varker
- Headquarters: Melbourne, Australia
- Services: Comic book retailing
- Website: allstarcomics.com.au

All Star Comics Melbourne is an Australian comic book store co-owned by Mitchell Davies and Troy Varker. The store was first opened in February 2011 and in 2014, won the Spirit of Comics Retailer Award at the 26th annual Eisner Awards. The award was split with the Legend Comics & Coffee in Nebraska.

== Awards ==
- Spirit of Comics Retailer Award at the Eisner Awards (2013, nominated)
- Spirit of Comics Retailer Award at the Eisner Awards (2014, won - split with Legend Comics & Coffee)
