= Maria Pascual Alberich =

Spanish draughtsperson and comics artist (1933–2011)

Maria Pasqual i Alberich (Barcelona, 1 July 1933 - 13 December 2011) was a prolific and popular Spanish illustrator.

== Biography ==
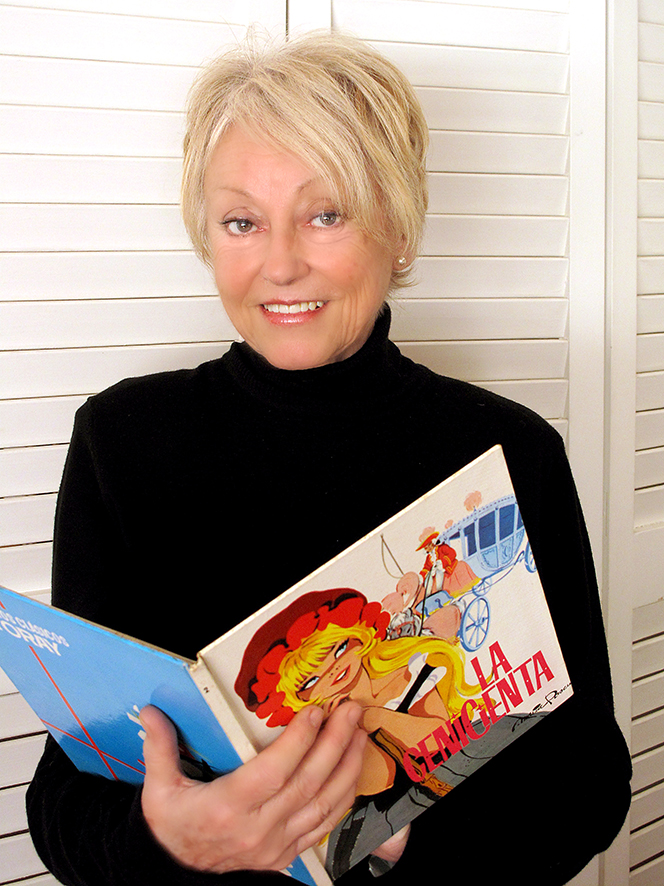

Maria Pascual Alberich began her career in the late 1940s, alternating editorials as Ameller (Los Mil y un cuentos, Princesita), Marte (Sam, Cuentos Mariposa) and Toray (Azucena, Cuentos de la Abuelita, Mis cuentos).

From 1955 Pascual Alberich worked almost exclusively for the publishing house Toray in both, previous collections and in new ones: Alice (1955), Graciela (1956), Lindaflor (1958), Rosas Blancas (1958), Guendalina (1959), Susan (1959), Serenade (1959) and Tales Diadema (1960). In Editorial Bruguera she published a couple of comics stories, “Sissi” (1957) and “Cuentos de Andersen” (1958), which are numbers 38 and 57 of the series Stories.

Later, Pascual Alberich worked in Editorial Susaeta, using her reputation to present collections such as Las muñecas Pascual Maria and Muñecas recortables de María Pascual. However, her most important work, was done with Grupo Océano: Cuentos infantils, La Biblia infantil, Fábulas, Las Mil y una noches, Aprenda inglés con María Pascual, Aprendo matemáticas, Mi primer diccionario, El sexo contado a los pequeños, etc. among the most important, though they were not very well known as they were intended for South America and several European countries. Her personal works include more than 2,000 drawings, and are preserved in the Biblioteca de Catalunya.

== Bibliography ==
- CUADRADO, Jesús (2000). Atlas español de la cultura popular: De la historieta y su uso 1873-2000, Madrid: Ediciones Sinsentido/Fundación Germán Sánchez Ruipérez. 2 v. ISBN 84-89384-23-1.
- MEDINA, Guillem (12/2010). Chicas del Cómic Barcelona: Ediciones Glenat
- MOIX, Terenci (2007). Historia social del cómic. Barcelona: Ediciones B. ISBN 978-84-02-42030-5 Depósito legal: B-2551-2007.
- RAMÍREZ, Juan Antonio (1975). El cómic femenino en España. Arte sub y anulación Madrid: Editorial Cuadernos para el Diálogo, S. A. Colección Divulgación universitaria, Arte y literatura, número 78. Depósito Legal: M. 8.752 - 1975 ISBN 84-229-0177-3.
