= Asian Arts Initiative =

Arts organization in Philadelphia, US

The Asian Arts Initiative (AAI) is a nonprofit organization in Philadelphia which focuses on art and the Asian-American community. It was founded by Gayle Isa, who also served as AAI's first executive director until June 2018. Under the leadership of Anne Ishii (2018–2024). and now Interim Director Dave Kyu, AAI has grown into an innovative, welcoming, and financially solid institution with a current annual budget of over $2M and significant cash reserves. AAI’s tight-knit, passionate team of 19 thrives in a culture that values humanity, equity, and creative risk-taking.

== History ==
Initially a small part of the Painted Bride Art Center, the Asian Arts Initiative (AAI) was created by Gayle Isa, a 1993 graduate of Swarthmore College, who envisioned creating a community of artists which could contribute to the growth of the neighborhood and to its cultural revival. In 1993, as a way of raising awareness about social and racial tension, the Painted Bride Art Center organized an Asian-American festival entitled "Live Traditions/Contemporary Issues," the first such festival dedicated to Asian American culture in Philadelphia.

In 1996, the AAI separated from the Painted Bride Art Center, becoming an independent nonprofit organization and moved into their own building located in the heart of Chinatown. In the same year, AAI began its first program, Artists in Community Training (ACT), a program meant to provide training for different artists interested in teaching and leading workshops. In 1998, the Youth Arts Workshops was introduced and offered diverse courses in which students of all ages could participate and in order to develop skills in creative writing and the visual arts. In the same year, the Rap Series was created as a way for Asian American artists to be able to meet, dialogue and get involved in the community.

The Asian Arts Initiative was forced to relocate in August 2008, "due to the expansion of the Philadelphia Convention Center," to a "three-level, 24,000 square-foot building at 1219 Vine Street", in the northern part of Chinatown. With funding from the City of Philadelphia, the State of Pennsylvania and private sources, the organization renovated part of the building into a multi-media facility that includes a gallery space and exhibition area, a theater, a media lab and library, and a generous space for workshops and meetings.

The Asian Arts Initiative is partnered with the National Performance Network and with the Mural Arts Program (MAP), through which it hopes to promote its belief that "art produced and presented in the community context".

== Gallery ==
The Asian Arts Initiative's gallery space hosts a number of contemporary artists of Asian descent originating in Philadelphia. Sparked by activism against large-scale changes to Chinatown, due to the proposal of a baseball stadium, the gallery was created to exhibit work that reflected the protest of the stadium project. Since the gallery’s opening in 2000, it has continued to host exhibitions ranging from paintings to installations 4 to 5 times a year. It featured several prominent figures in the art community as well as displaying the work of their youth workshops once a year. Visitors and participants become involved in viewing and learning about different artists and their artwork through these galleries. Several different benefactors support the Gallery exhibits, one being the Andy Warhol Foundation for Visual Arts.

== Workshops ==
The Asian Arts Initiative provides a number of workshops that encourage participation from Philadelphia residents, focusing on specific types of artistic skills such as mural art, cooking, video editing, radio broadcasting, writing, and poetry.
