= Eric Resetar =

New Zealand cartoonist

Eric Resetar (1928 – 21 December 2011) was a New Zealand cartoonist, best known for his superhero comics Crash Carson of the future and Crash O'Kane, an All Black on Mars.

== Early life ==
Resetar was born in Auckland, New Zealand, in 1928. He was influenced by science fiction magazines and comics such as Buck Rogers from a young age.

== Career ==
Resetar's first comics were published during World War II, while he was still at school. His early comics were popular, with some issues selling 10,000 copies. The New Zealand comics awards, the Erics, were named after him. From the 1960s, he ran a series of secondhand bookshops in Auckland, specialising in science fiction paperbacks.

== Exhibitions ==
- 'Cartoon Show' (2001–2002), Auckland Art Gallery

== Publications ==
- Treasure comic : Black Cobra and the red gold (194?). Auckland, Triple C Co
- Adventure: thrills on the planet Jupiter! (1944) Auckland, Artcraft
- Crash Carson of the future (1943). Auckland, Triple C Co.
- Halfback (1960). Auckland, self published
