= I...Vampire =

Andrew Bennett
- Cover of The House of Mystery #290 (March 1981), art by Joe Kubert.

Publication information
- Publisher: DC Comics
- First appearance: The House of Mystery #290 (March, 1981)
- Created by: J. M. DeMatteis (writer); Tom Sutton (artist)

In-story information
- Full name: Andrew Bennett
- Team affiliations: Justice League Dark; Team 13; Justice League
- Abilities: Traditional vampiric attributes such as immortality and healing, superhuman strength and speed, heightened senses (including night vision), hypnosis, and the ability to transform into a bat (or to manifest bat-like wings), a wolf or werewolf-like creature, or a cloud of fog

I...Vampire (also titled I, Vampire) is a comic book series from DC Comics created by writer J. M. DeMatteis and artist Tom Sutton about a fictional character named Andrew Bennett. The character and storyline originally started as a backup story in The House of Mystery between 1981 and 1983, but was popular enough to become the main feature. The I...Vampire finale was almost book-length.

== Concept and creation ==
J. M. DeMatteis pitched the series to editor Len Wein under the title "Greenberg". Wein liked the concept, but rejected the title and suggested "I...Vampire" instead. DeMatteis would later revive the title for his 1985 Marvel Graphic Novel Greenberg the Vampire.

== Fictional character biography (original series) ==
In 1591, after being turned into a vampire himself, Lord Andrew Bennett turned his lover, Mary Seward, into a vampire, and she became corrupted by the power. She took the name Mary, Queen of Blood and created a group of vampires called the Blood Red Moon bent on taking over the world. The series followed Bennett into the modern day as he tried to undo his mistake and take down Mary and the Blood Red Moon.

He was helped by his two companions Deborah Dancer, a beautiful young woman who Bennett saved from Mary at Woodstock (and who was also his girlfriend) and Dmitri Mishkin, a Russian man who Bennett rescued from Mary (and his own mother, turned by Mary) when Mishkin was a child.

To try to keep his humanity, Bennett made a vow to only drink the blood of animals and bottled human blood (which created a subtext of alcoholism). In the original series, Bennett keeps his companions at arm's length, particularly Dancer. For a time, he stays away from them altogether for fear of putting them in danger.

Storylines included Mishkin's quest to find and destroy the vampire who was his mother, Bennett's pursuit of Mary through various time periods leading back to a time before either of them were vampires (motivated on Mary's part by a desire to escape a strange disease killing vampires in the present), and finally an experimental 'cure' for vampirism which leads to the final confrontation between the surviving protagonists and Mary.

=== Later stories ===
Bennett has attempted suicide on several occasions to end his curse, and has also been brought back to life after each attempt due to a higher power, as seen in the 1988 run of Doctor Fate. During this run, we also see Andrew Bennett interact with the Lords of Chaos and Order to seek an end to time, which does occur due to the vampire's involvement, but is later reversed. He also appeared in the 2005 miniseries Day of Vengeance as a background character in the Oblivion Bar, which became the Shadowpact's headquarters. He appears as a supporting character in Doctor Thirteen backup stories in the 2006 miniseries Tales of the Unexpected.

== Powers and abilities ==
Andrew Bennett has the powers of an elder vampire. He can transform into mist, a bat, and a wolf and has superior strength far beyond that of a mortal man. He is immortal and possesses the ability to turn others into vampires, a healing factor, hypnosis, and limited telepathy. His image cannot be seen, such as being reflected in a mirror or captured on film. He, however, also has the weaknesses of a vampire. He is severely weakened by sunlight, losing most of his vampiric powers, and he can be killed by silver, fire, and/or a wooden stake to the heart.

== The New 52 ==
The title was relaunched as part of DC Comics company-wide title relaunch The New 52. The initial creative team is Joshua Hale Fialkov writing and Andrea Sorrentino as penciller. The first issue was very well received critically, and was the 78th best selling comic in September 2011 by units.

In this version, Andrew Bennett is an older vampire (approximately 600 years old) but has the physical appearance of a man in his 20s. His former lover, Mary, Queen of Blood, gathers an army of vampires to take over the world. Wounded trying to stop her, Andrew seeks out help from his old ally Professor John Troughton. They are soon joined by a young vampire hunter Tig, whose father had been turned into a vampire. Traveling to Gotham City, they, along with Batman, confront Mary's horde, but Tig kills Andrew and unwittingly releases Cain, the original vampire, from extradimensional captivity. Cain takes command of the horde of vampires from Mary and begins absorbing magic. Tig, Troughton, Batman, and the Justice League Dark are almost overwhelmed by the vampires when Madame Xanadu manages to resurrect Andrew Bennett, who proceeds to kill Cain and claim leadership of the vampire horde for himself, promising a new era free from conflict with humans.

The series ended in April 2013 with issue #19. Fialkov was told about the cancellation when he finished the script for issue #15 and is satisfied with the conclusion to the series.

=== Vampire lore ===
In the New 52 continuity, vampires possess the generic abilities associated with the undead, namely supernatural powers of strength and speed, immortality, and accelerated healing, as well as enhanced senses sufficient to track blood by scent, hear heartbeats and see in the dark. Unlike most popular depictions of vampires, however, they are not burned from exposure to direct sunlight. Instead, similar to the literary Dracula, sunlight dulls their senses and severely weakens their physical attributes to the point of becoming effectively human or even less so in terms of their abilities. These vampires trace their lineage to the Biblical Cain. After being exiled from Paradise and cursed with the Mark of Cain for killing his brother Abel, Cain wandered a vast desert until he came across the first woman, Lilith. Consumed with bloodlust, he turned her out of sheer instinct.

They have shown the ability to shapeshift to a greater extent than before, being able to become a variety of different forms, none of which have been completely defined. Vampires have also shown the ability to create clothes through shapeshifting. While all vampires can turn into wolves, Andrew has shown to be able to combine his wolf form with his natural 'human' form to create a monstrous werewolf-like creature. Andrew has also shown that he is able to change into a mist and back, being able to do this in combat as well to avoid strikes in the "nick of time", rendering him intangible. He has also shown to be able to mist all of his clothes as well as the weapon he was carrying. Andrew can also turn into a swarm of bats or sprout large bat-like wings from his back in order to achieve flight. In addition, Andrew also has the ability to "sway" humans to do his bidding and can alter their memories. After the events from Rise of the Vampires, Andrew can cast magic and do things like resurrect people and vampires, freeze his enemies, and absorb dark magic, among other things. Besides his vampiric powers, Andrew has been shown to be an expert tracker and master swordsman with unparalleled combat skills.

== Alternative versions ==
In the 2021 out-of-continuity miniseries, DC vs Vampires, Mary, Queen of Blood is shown to be the leader of vampires worldwide and in favor of vampires continuing to hide in the shadows, until she is overthrown by an unknown enemy. Vampires proceed to convert or kill high-profile superheroes and villains in the hopes of establishing a new world order. Andrew Bennet attempts to alert the Justice League, but only succeeds in informing Batman before he is killed by a converted Green Lantern.

== Collected editions ==
The original series was collected in April 2012 under the title I...Vampire. It included The House of Mystery #290, 291, 293, 295, 297, 299, 302, and 304–319 and The Brave and the Bold #195 (ISBN 1401233716).

Issues #1–6 of the New 52 series were collected in October 2012 under the title I, Vampire Volume 1: Tainted Love (ISBN 1401236871).

Issues #7–12 of the New 52 series, along with Justice League Dark #7–8, were collected in March 2013 under the title I, Vampire Volume 2: Rise of the Vampires.

Issue #0 and issues #13–19 of the New 52 series were collected in December 2013 under the title I, Vampire Volume 3: Wave of Mutilation.
