= James Stokoe =

Canadian comic book artist (born 1985)

- Born: September 4, 1985 (age 41)
- Areas: Writer, Penciller, Inker, Letterer, Colourist
- Spouse: Marley Zarcone

James Stokoe (born September 4, 1985) is a Canadian comic book artist who is known for his work on such titles as Wonton Soup, Orc Stain and Godzilla: The Half-Century War.

Along with Corey Lewis, Brandon Graham and Marley Zarcone, he is a part of a studio/collective called "Yosh Comics".

== Bibliography ==
=== Early work ===
- Otakorp:
  - Otazine #1: "Smokedown" (w/a, anthology, 2005)
  - Snack Comix #1: "Krill or be Krilled" (w/a, 2006)
- Rival Schools #1–4 (backgrounds, w/a: Corey Lewis and Erik Ko, UDON, 2006)
- Wonton Soup: Big Bowl Edition (w/a, tpb, 392 pages, Oni Press, 2014, ISBN 978-1-62010-166-7 collects:
  - Volume 1 (tpb, 200 pages, Oni Press, 2007, ISBN 1-932664-60-2)
  - Volume 2 (tpb, 184 pages, Oni Press, 2009, ISBN 1-934964-20-4)

=== Image Comics ===
- 24Seven Volume 1: "Fire Breathing City" (a, with Brandon Graham, anthology graphic novel, 224 pages, 2006, ISBN 1-58240-636-7)
- Popgun Volume 1: "Express Elevator to Hell Tour" (w/a, anthology graphic novel, 455 pages, 2007, ISBN 1-58240-824-6)
- Comic Book Tattoo: "Mr. Zebra" (a, with Rantz Hoseley, anthology graphic novel, 480 pages, 2008, ISBN 1-58240-965-X)
- Orc Stain (w/a, 2010–2012) collected as:
  - Volume 1 (collects #1–5, tpb, 168 pages, 2010, ISBN 1-60706-295-X)
  - Issues 6–7 remain uncollected.
- Tokyopop Presents: King City #7: "Power Plant" (w/a, co-feature, 2010) collected in King City (tpb, 424 pages, 2012, ISBN 1-60706-510-X)
- Prophet #39: "Diehard" (a, with Brandon Graham, among other artists, Extreme Studios, 2013) collected in Volume 4: Joining (tpb, 168 pages, 2015, ISBN 1-63215-254-1)

=== Marvel Comics ===
- Marvel Knights: Strange Tales II #3: "Silver Surfer" (w/a, anthology, 2011) collected in Strange Tales II (hc, 144 pages, 2011, ISBN 0-7851-4822-1; tpb, 2011, ISBN 0-7851-4823-X)
- 100th Anniversary Special: The Avengers (w/a, one-shot, 2014) collected in Marvel: The 100th Anniversary (tpb, 112 pages, 2014, ISBN 0-7851-5413-2)
- Secret Wars:
  - Siege #1 (of 4) (a, with Kieron Gillen, among other artists, 2015) collected in Secret Wars — Battleworld: Siege (tpb, 144 pages, 2016, ISBN 0-7851-9549-1)
  - Battleworld #4: "Silver Surfer vs. Galactus" (w/a, anthology, 2015) collected in Secret Wars Journal & Battleworld (tpb, 248 pages, 2016, ISBN 0-7851-9580-7)
- Moon Knight vol. 6 (a, with Jeff Lemire, Greg Smallwood, Wilfredo Torres and Francesco Francavilla, 2016–2017) collected in:
  - Lunatic (includes #5, tpb, 120 pages, 2016, ISBN 0-7851-9953-5)
  - Reincarnations (collects #6–9, tpb, 112 pages, 2016, ISBN 0-7851-9954-3)
- Edge of Venomverse #5 (a, with Clay McLeod Chapman, 2017) collected in Edge of Venomverse (tpb, 112 pages, 2018, ISBN 1-302-90856-1)
- Venom vol. 4 Annual #1: "Unstoppable" (w/a, 2018)
- Captain Marvel vol. 10 #8: "Everyone is a Target, Part Eight" (a, with Clay McLeod Chapman, co-feature, 2019)
- Marvel Monsters (a, with Cullen Bunn, Scott Hepburn and various artists, one-shot, 2019)

=== Other publishers ===
- Godzilla (IDW Publishing):
  - The Half-Century War #1–5 (w/a, 2012–2013) collected as Godzilla: The Half-Century War (tpb, 124 pages, 2013, ISBN 1-61377-595-4; hc, 152 pages, 2015, ISBN 1-63140-321-4)
  - Godzilla in Hell #1 (of 5) (w/a, anthology, 2015) collected in Godzilla in Hell (tpb, 120 pages, 2016, ISBN 1-63140-534-9)
- Sullivan's Sluggers (a, with Mark Andrew Smith, graphic novel, 200 pages, Kickstarter, 2012, ISBN 0-9882325-0-2)
- Think of a City page 45 (a, with Steve Orlando, Internet art project, 2015)
- Aliens: Dead Orbit #1-4 (w/a, Dark Horse, 2017) collected as Aliens: Dead Orbit (tpb, 104 pages, 2018, ISBN 1-5067-0333-X; hc, 120 pages, 2019, ISBN 1-5067-0992-3)
- Sobek (w/a, one-shot, ShortBox, 2019)
- Grunt: The Art and Unpublished Comics of James Stokoe (w/a, Dark Horse, hc, 184 pages, 2019, ISBN 1-5067-1169-3)
- Orphan and the Five Beasts (Dark Horse Comics, 2022), ISBN 1-5067-1517-6

=== Covers only ===
- Godzilla: Gangsters and Goliaths #2 (IDW Publishing, 2011)
- Cinema Sewer #26 (Robin Bougie, 2013)
- Helheim #2 (Oni Press, 2013)
- Monstrosity #2 (Kickstarter, 2014)
- Rogue Trooper #1–4 (IDW Publishing, 2014)
- What if...? — Age of Ultron #2 (Marvel, 2014)
- The Transformers vs. G.I. Joe #1 (IDW Publishing, 2014)
- Legendary Star-Lord #11 (Marvel, 2015)
- Thor vol. 4 #2 (Marvel, 2015)
- Cluster #1 (Boom! Studios, 2015)
- Zombies vs. Robots #2–4 (IDW Publishing, 2015)
- Secret Wars: Battleworld #1–3 (Marvel, 2015)
- Secret Wars: Attilan Rising #2 (Marvel, 2015)
- Prophet Volume 4 tpb (Image, 2015)
- S.H.I.E.L.D. vol. 4 #11 (Marvel, 2015)
- Drax #2 (Marvel, 2016)
- Judge Dredd vol. 2 #3 (IDW Publishing, 2016)
- Godzilla: Oblivion #1–5 (IDW Publishing, 2016)
- Head Lopper #3 (Image, 2016)
- Birthright #15 (Image, 2016)
- Nova vol. 7 #2 (Marvel, 2017)
- Venom #150 (Marvel, 2017)
- Samurai Jack: Quantum Jack #3 (IDW Publishing, 2017)
- Black Hammer: Age of Doom #1 (Dark Horse, 2018)
- Under #1–2 (Statix Press, 2018)
- 2021: Lost Children #1 (Statix Press, 2018)
- Eclipse #9 (Top Cow, 2018)
- Cayrels Ring #1 (Kickstarter, 2018)
- William Gibson's Alien 3 #1 (Dark Horse, 2018)
- Robotech #14 (Titan, 2018)
- Calamity Kate #2 (Dark Horse, 2019)
- Absolute Carnage: Symbiote of Vengeance #1 (Marvel, 2019)

=== Unfinished projects ===
- Fire for Effect (w/a, a Heavy Metal pitch, 200?)
- Nomad of the Domes (w/a, 2007–2008)
- War Wonton Soup (w/a, spin-off, 2008–2009)
- Murderbullets (w/a, anthology entry turned five-book series, 2008–2009)
- Orc Stain:
  - "Long Scar's Heat" (w/a, short story for the first trade paperback, 2010)
  - Poison Thrower (w/a, Bowie Yaramund-centered one-shot, 2011–2012)
  - "The Calling" (w/a, short story, 2014)
- Spider-'Nam (w/a, "Spider-Man in Vietnam" fan comic, 2011–2012)
- I Will Tell You About Dionysus (w/a, 2013–2014)

== Sources ==
Interviews

- Tramountanas, George (March 8, 2007). "Wonton Soup – An Adventure in Sci-Fi Cooking with James Stokoe". Comic Book Resources. Archived from the original on November 8, 2012.
- Arrant, Chris (June 30, 2009). "James Stokoe: Getting His Won Ton On". Newsarama.
- Wigler, Josh (October 10, 2009). "James Stokoe Makes an 'Orc Stain'". Comic Book Resources. Archived from the original on October 12, 2009.
- McGuirk, Brendan (January 7, 2010). "Writer/Artist Takes on Fantasy Tropes in Image's Orc Stain". Newsarama. Archived from the original on March 6, 2016.
- Wigler, Josh (December 16, 2010). "Collecting Stokoe's "Orc Stain"". Comic Book Resources. Archived from the original on May 14, 2011.
- Marshall, Rick (May 6, 2011). "James Stokoe Debuts His Troll Hunter Poster And Original Art!". MTV.com. Archived from the original on August 9, 2016.
- Novi, Magazine (March 8, 2012). "THE OTHER KIND OF PERFECT: AN INTERVIEW WITH JAMES STOKOE".
- Staff Writer (June 21, 2012). "GODZILLA Returns to Roots Under Stokoe's Detailed Pen". Newsarama. Archived from the original on September 12, 2015.
- Sims, Chris (June 27, 2014). "James Stokoe Talks Avengers 100th Anniversary Special And The Next 50 Years Of Comics". ComicsAlliance. Archived from the original on June 25, 2016.
- Akhtar, Zainab (July 3, 2015). "An interview with James Stokoe: 'Need and career are two things that I've never felt strongly for'". Comics&Cola.
