= Act-i-vate =

Webcomics collective

ACT-I-VATE
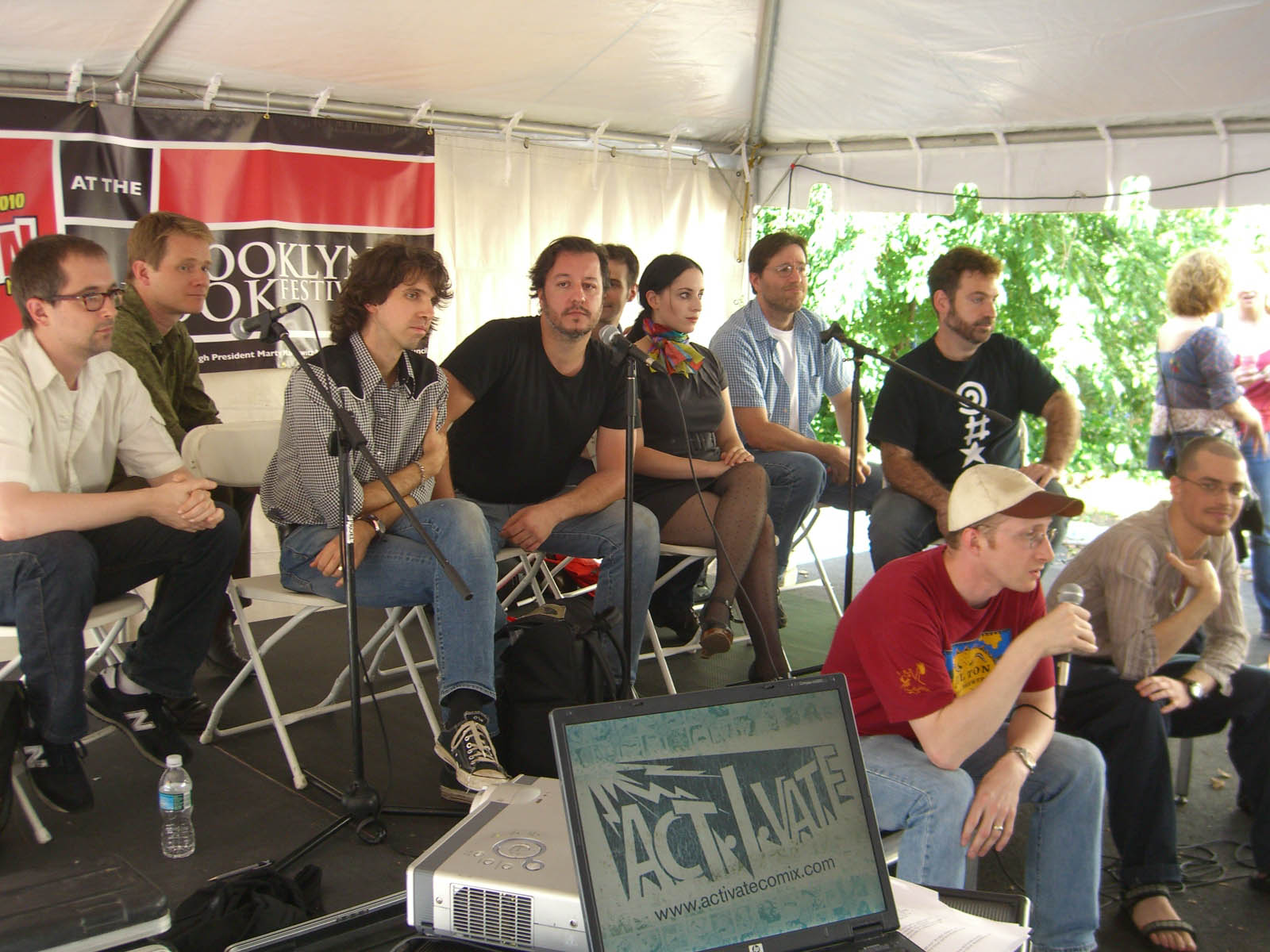
- ACT-I-VATE panel at the 2009 Brooklyn Book Festival. Seated left to right on chairs are Joe Infurnari, Simon Fraser, Tom Hart, Dean Haspiel, Nathan Schreiber, Molly Crabapple, Tim Hamilton, and Jeff Newelt, acting as moderator. On the edge of the stage are Leland Purvis and Rami Efal.
- Founded: 2006; 20 years ago
- Founders: Nick Bertozzi; Nikki Cook; Michel Fiffe; Dan Goldman; Tim Hamilton; Dean Haspiel; Josh Neufeld; Leland Purvis
- Defunct: c. 2016
- Type: Webcomics collective
- Members: Anne Barnetson; Pedro Camargo; Mike Cavallaro; Kevin Colden; Molly Crabapple; Darryl Cunningham; Mike Dawson; Andrew Dimitt; Rami Efal; Ulises Fariñas; Simon Fraser; Roger Langridge; Jason Little; Paul Maybury; Warren Pleece; Ryan Roman; Britt Sabo; Nathan Schreiber; Paul Peart-Smith; Jennifer Tong; Dean Trippe; Chip Zdarsky
- Website: www.act-i-vate.com

ACT-I-VATE was an American webcomics collective based on an original idea by Dean Haspiel and founded by Haspiel and seven other cartoonists. It started out on the blogging platform Livejournal, and then moved to its own dedicated website.

The ACT-I-VATE collective featured serialized graphic novels from over twenty-five hand-picked professional cartoonists (each of whom generally added a new episode weekly), and was updated daily. ACT-I-VATE members included Haspiel, Nick Bertozzi, Michel Fiffe, Dan Goldman, Tim Hamilton, Josh Neufeld, Leland Purvis, Mike Cavallaro, Kevin Colden, Molly Crabapple, Darryl Cunningham, Mike Dawson, Ulises Fariñas, Simon Fraser, Tom Hart, Roger Langridge, Jason Little, Paul Maybury, Warren Pleece, Palle Schmidt, Paul Peart-Smith, Dean Trippe, and Chip Zdarsky.

ACT-I-VATE's artists were unpaid, and produced their work without editorial oversight. ACT-I-VATE was also free to view. In addition to the high-quality comics, the site was known for its vocal community of readers and the lengthy discussion threads between artist and reader.

In 2009, IDW Publishing released The Act-i-vate Primer, a Harvey Award-nominated anthology featuring 16 original comics stories by members of the collective.

== History ==
=== Origins ===
ACT-I-VATE debuted on February 1, 2006, with eight cartoonists, and added four more members on April 5, 2006. The collective gradually added new hand-picked cartoonists at a regular rate to the point the membership reached in excess of 50 creators.

=== From the web to print ===
ACT-I-VATE rose to prominence when many of its artists, including Haspiel, Michel Fiffe, Mike Cavallaro, Dan Goldman, and Nick Bertozzi, began to receive publishing deals. Haspiel and Fiffe's three-issue mini-series, Brawl, a "creature romance double feature" featuring Haspiel's Immortal (starring Billy Dogma) and Fiffe's Panorama, which both originated on ACT-I-VATE, was published by Image Comics in the Fall of 2007. Similarly, Parade (with Fireworks), by Mike Cavallaro, began on ACT-I-VATE, was first excerpted in New York magazine and was later published by Image.

Act-i-vate members Ulises Fariñas, Michel Fiffe, Dean Haspiel, Tim Hamilton, Dan Goldman, Paul Maybury, and Nikki Cook all had work published in Image Comics' Popgun anthology vol. 2, published in July 2008.

==== The Act-i-vate Primer ====
The Act-i-vate Primer, published in October 2009 by IDW, was edited by Dean Haspiel & Scott Dunbier, and featured a foreword by Warren Ellis. The book's 16 original comics were by Roger Langridge, Mike Dawson, Nick Bertozzi, Tim Hamilton, Dean Haspiel, Pedro Camargo, Mike Cavallaro, Molly Crabapple, Jim Dougan, Ulises Fariñas, Michel Fiffe, Maurice Fontenot, Simon Fraser, Jennifer Hayden, Joe Infurnari, John Leavitt, Hyeondo Park, and Leland Purvis.

The Act-i-vate Primer was covered by, among others, The New York Times, Comic Critique, and Comic Book Resources; and was named to Heeb's top ten comics for the year. It was nominated for a Harvey Award for Best Anthology.

=== Demise ===
In 2015 the site had a serious outage. It was restored from backups, but the hosting company was not able to get it working as it had before. The codebase for the site was out of date and filled with bugs, and the original programmers were no longer able to maintain it.

In 2016, the site administrator (at that point cartoonist Simon Fraser, working on a volunteer basis and with little available resources), came to the conclusion that shutting down the site was the only recourse. The archived site remained at its original URL through 2018 and officially went dead on January 28, 2019.

== Titles (selected) ==
- Aggro by Simon Fraser
- Ass Meat by Simon Fraser
- Ayn Rand by Darryl Cunningham
- Backstage by John Leavitt and Molly Crabapple
- Barney Banks: Extra Life! by Tom Hart
- Beanbots by Kevin Kobasic
- The Black Feather Falls by Ellen Lindner
- Borb by Jason Little
- Cartoon Boy by John Kerschbaum
- Come the Dawn by Jim Dougan and Hyeondo Park
- Corinthian Diary by Glynnis Fawkes
- Cover Art by Leland Purvis
- Culture Pop by Seth Kushner
- Deja Voodoo by Simon Fraser, Dan Goldman, and Michel Fiffe
- Diaspora by Cristian Ortiz
- Drockleberry by Andrew Dimitt
- Easy Pieces by Neil Dvorak
- The End is Here by Thomas Baehr
- Everywhere by Chris Miskiewicz and Andrew Wendel
- The Falconer by Yana Adamovic (based on a short story by Vladimir Lazovic)
- Farseeker by Dirk Manning and Len O'Grady
- Fear, My Dear by Dean Haspiel
- Fever Dream by Kat Roberts
- Fish Everywhere by Palle Schmidt
- Fishtown by Kevin Colden — Xeric Award-winner
- The Fist by Darryl Cunningham
- Flowing Wells by Andrew Dimitt
- Gang of Fools by James Smith
- Glam by Pedro Camargo
- Ghost Pimp by Maurice Fontenot
- Girl Mercury by Ulises Fariñas
- Golden Campaign by Cristian Ortiz
- The Golem's Voice by David G. Klein
- Hairkut by Dan Goldman
- Hebi no Hadi by Rami Efal
- Hippy Days by Sam Henderson
- How I Built My Father by Rob Davis
- The Homeric Hymn to Dionysos by Glynnis Fawkes
- Immortal by Dean Haspiel
- Iphigenia in Taurus by Glynnis Fawkes
- Jack & Max by Mike Dawson
- Kelly by Dan Goldman
- Lilly MacKenzie and the Mines of Charybdis by Simon Fraser
- Lilly MacKenzie and the Treasure of Pars by Simon Fraser
- Lionel's Lament by Dean Haspiel and Josh Neufeld
- Love & Zombies by Ryan Roman
- Loviathan by Mike Cavallaro
- Machismo Monitor! by Jim Dougan and Roger Langridge
- A Mess of Everything by Miss Lasko-Gross
- A Mid-Autumn Night's Dream by Robin Ha
- Montague Terrace by Warren Pleece
- Mosquito Beach by Robin Ha
- Motel Art Improvement Service by Jason Little
- Motro by Ulises Fariñas
- Mugwhump the Great by Roger Langridge
- My Family and Other Gypsies by Rob Davis
- Never Forget Never Forgive by Rami Efal
- A New Elegant Universe by Ulises Fariñas
- Nilharity by Shannon Wheeler
- Nombril by Leland Purvis
- Now It Can Be Told by Scott Shaw!
- One Plus One by Paul Peart-Smith
- Orifice by Jen Tong
- Panorama by Michel Fiffe
- Parade (with Fireworks) by Mike Cavallaro
- Party Bear by Paul Maybury
- Pecan Sandy by Nick Bertozzi
- Persimmon Cup by Nick Bertozzi
- Pet Sitter by Tim Hamilton
- Post-Punk & Pirates by Gideon Kendall
- Power Out by Nathan Schreiber
- Pregnant Butch by A. K. Summers
- The Prince and the Pooper by Dov Torbin
- Rest Stop by Jim Dougan and Michel Fiffe
- The Revolution Will Be Televised by Dov Torbin
- Rudolph! by Lucie Arnoux
- Sack of Puppies by Nikki Cook
- Sam & Lilah by Jim Dougan and Hyeondo Park
- Schmuck by Seth Kushner and Kevin Colden
- S'crapbook by Jennifer Hayden
- Sex Planet by Dean Haspiel
- Shrooms by Gideon Kendall
- Sleazy Pizza by Ryan Roman
- Space Sucks by Pedro Camargo
- The Streets of San Diablo by Darryl Cunningham
- The Sultan's Daughter by Glynnis Fawkes
- Tales of the Floating Elephant by Tim Hamilton
- Texas Kid by Igor Kordej
- The Torturer's Garden by Rob Davis
- Troop 142 by Mike Dawson
- ULTRA-Lad! by Joe Infurnari
- Uncle Bob and the Martian Invasion by Darryl Cunningham
- Uncle Bob on Skull Island by Darryl Cunningham
- Underwire by Jennifer Hayden
- Uplift the Postivicals by Tim Hall and Jen Ferguson
- The Vagabonds by Josh Neufeld
- The Voyage of the James Caird by Nick Bertozzi
- Vulcan & Vishnu by Leland Purvis
- Wake by Dean Trippe
- Whatzit by Gideon Kendall
- Zdarsky-verse by Chip Zdarsky
- Zegas by Michel Fiffe
