= AJB =

AJB or A. J. B. may refer to:

== Business and Organizations ==
- Aero JBR (ICAO code AJB), a Mexican airline
- AJ Bell (LSE: AJB), a public limited company that provides online investment services
- Al Jazeera Balkans (AJB), an international news television service headquartered in Sarajevo, Bosnia
- Association of Jews in Belgium (AJB), former organization set up by the Germans to administer the Belgian Jewish population, 1941

== People ==
- A. J. B. Hope, one of the monikers of Alexander Beresford Hope (1820–1887)
- A. J. Braga (1900–1968), Singaporean politician
- Archibald James Butterworth (1912–2005), inventor and racing motorist who built the A.J.B. Special, a Formula One car

== Publications ==
- American Journal of Botany, monthly peer-reviewed scientific journal
- American Journal of Business, biannual peer-reviewed academic journal
- The Amazing Jeckel Brothers, an album by Insane Clown Posse
- The Amazing Joy Buzzards, a comic book series
