= Judge Dredd (IDW Publishing) =

Comic book series

Publication information
- Publisher: IDW Publishing
- Schedule: Bi-monthly
- Publication date: November 2012 – March 2020
- No. of issues: 90 (including 14 Classics reprints)

Judge Dredd is a comic book series by American company IDW Publishing, based on the character of Judge Dredd from the British comic magazines 2000 AD and Judge Dredd Megazine. The series is made up of an ongoing series, Judge Dredd, and occasionally a miniseries. There is also a third series, titled Judge Dredd - Classics, which is a republishing, in color, of the original British stories and is not part of the IDW continuity.

== Judge Dredd ==
In November 2012, IDW Publishing began the Judge Dredd monthly series written by Duane Swierczynski and illustrated by Nelson Daniel. The series ended after 30 issues.

The series included several long-term plot elements, such as rebelling robots, a Judge serial killer and the moon Titan, where ex-Judges go.

== Judge Dredd – Year One ==
The four-issue mini-series Judge Dredd – Year One began publishing in March 2013, and is set during Dredd's first year as a judge. Written by Matt Smith, art by Simon Coleby.

== Judge Dredd – Classics ==
Starting with a Free Comic Book Day issue in May 2013, and an ongoing series later in July 2013, IDW began publishing classic Judge Dredd stories in full color. The FCBD issue contains the first Judge Death story. From there, the series continued with the "Block Mania" / "The Apocalypse War" storyline. Eight issues in the ongoing series were released.

== Mars Attacks Judge Dredd ==
In September 2013, a new four-issue mini-series started as part of the IDW-wide Mars Attacks cross-over event. The Martians have decided on a subtler infiltration of Earth...through Mega-City One's criminal element. They are more than willing to sit back and have their Earth-bound agents buy out the competition with legitimate tactics. For now.

== Judge Dredd – Mega-City Two: City of Courts ==
Starting in January 2014, IDW began publishing a five-issue mini-series titled Mega-City Two: City of Courts. The city that has unfolded from the remains of Hollywood is not quite like Mega-City One. The Judges are forced to carry stun-guns only and nearly everyone is interested in fame and glory — quite possibly, before justice. Dredd, however, is keeping his cool as he's sent in to teach Mega City Two a lesson. Written by Douglas Wolk, art by Ulises Farinas.

== Judge Dredd – Anderson, Psi-Division ==
Starting in August 2014, IDW began publishing a four-issue mini-series titled Anderson, Psi-Division, which continued to explore Dredd's early years as a follow-up to the Judge Dredd – Year One series.

== Judge Dredd – Classics – The Dark Judges ==
In January 2015, IDW started publishing a five-issue mini-series that was a reprint compilation of classic Judge Death tales.

== Judge Dredd – Mega-City Zero ==
Starting in December 2015, IDW began publishing a series titled Mega-City Zero. Ushering in a brave new era, Judge Dredd awakens to find that Mega-City One has been sent back to the Stone Age, with city blocks overgrown and nary a citizen to be found. Witness as Dredd struggles to unravel the mystery as he copes with being just an ordinary Joe.... 12 issues were released.

== Predator vs. Judge Dredd vs. Aliens ==
Starting in July 2016, four issues were published intermittently, ending in June 2017. Written by John Layman, art by Chris Mooneyham.

== Judge Dredd – Cry of the Werewolf ==
In March 2017, IDW published a one-shot titled Cry of the Werewolf. This was a reprint of a story from 2012 that inspired the Deviations issue of Judge Dredd.

== Judge Dredd – The Blessed Earth ==
Starting in April 2017, IDW began publishing a new series titled The Blessed Earth that takes place 10 years after the events of Mega-City Zero. 9 issues were released, including a 2017 Annual issue.

== Judge Dredd – Funko Universe ==
In May 2017, IDW published a one-shot titled Funko Universe. This was a crossover of the Judge Dredd universe with the Funko universe, Funko the maker of the popular Pop! figure line.

== Judge Dredd – Deviations ==
In May 2018, IDW published a one-shot titled Deviations. Written and illustrated by John McCrea.

== Judge Dredd – Under Siege ==
In May 2018, IDW began publishing a 4-issue series titled Under Siege. Written by Mark Russell, art by Max Dunbar.

== Judge Dredd – Toxic ==
In October 2018, IDW began publishing a 4-issue series titled Toxic. Written by Paul Jenkins, art by Marco Castiello.

== Judge Dredd – False Witness ==
In February 2020, IDW began publishing a 4-issue series titled False Witness. The last three issues were delayed from their expected publication schedule due to the coronavirus pandemic. Written by Brandon Easton, art by Kei Zama.

== Judge Dredd – 100-Page Giant ==
In March 2020, IDW published a one-shot story collection titled 100-Page Giant. This collection was well received as a jumping on point for getting familiar with Judge Dredd.
