= Marley Zarcone =

Canadian comic book artist

- Areas: Penciller, Inker
- Notable works: Effigy; Shade, the Changing Girl
- Spouse: James Stokoe

Marley Zarcone is a Canadian comic book artist who works primarily for Image and DC Comics. Along with Corey Lewis, Brandon Graham and James Stokoe, she's a part of a studio/collective called "Yosh Comics". In 2015, she launched Effigy with Tim Seeley for DC Comics' Vertigo imprint. In 2016, she launched Shade, the Changing Girl with Cecil Castellucci for Gerard Way's Young Animal imprint.

== Bibliography ==
Interior comic work includes:

- Rival Schools #1-4 (inks on James Stokoe, UDON, 2006)
  - Stokoe's art is backgrounds only.
  - Written and drawn by Corey Lewis and Erik Ko.
- Popgun Volume 2: "Scummy" (script and art, anthology graphic novel, Image, 2008)
- Forgetless #1-5: "Rememberful?" (with Nick Spencer, co-feature, Image, 2009)
- Madame Xanadu #24: "Extra-Sensory, Chapter One" (with Matt Wagner, Vertigo, 2010)
- House of Mystery vol. 2 #31: "The Mystery of the Missing Ghost" (with Matthew Sturges, co-feature, Vertigo, 2011)
- Blue Estate #5 (with Viktor Kalvachev, Andrew Osborne, Toby Cypress, Nathan Fox and Paul Maybury, Image, 2011)
- Teenage Mutant Ninja Turtles Micro-Series #7: "April" (with Barbara Kesel, IDW Publishing, 2012)
- Fairest in All the Land: "Sword Points" (with Bill Willingham, anthology graphic novel, Vertigo, 2013)
- Justice League vol. 2 #23.3 (with China Miéville, among other artists, DC Comics, 2013)
- Elephantmen #57: "Agathe" (with Richard Starkings and Marian Churchland, Image, 2014)
- Effigy #1-6: "Idle Worship" (with Tim Seeley, Vertigo, 2015)
- Shade, the Changing Girl #1-6, 8-12 (with Cecil Castellucci, DC's Young Animal, 2016–2017)
- Thought Bubble Anthology #6: "To the Moon" (with Cecil Castellucci, anthology, Image, 2017)
- The Secret Loves of Geeks: "Gaming is Bad for Me" (script and art, anthology graphic novel, Dark Horse, 2018)
- Doom Patrol/JLA Special (with Gerard Way, Steve Orlando and various artists, DC's Young Animal, 2018)
- Shade, the Changing Woman #1-6 (with Cecil Castellucci, DC's Young Animal, 2018)
- Marilyn Manor #1-4 (with Magdalene Visaggio, Black Crown, 2019)
  - The series was cancelled after the release of the first issue.

=== Covers only ===
- Morning Glories #29 (Shadowline, 2013)
- Teenage Mutant Ninja Turtles: Casey and April #3 (IDW Publishing, 2015)
- Jem and the Holograms: Infinite #1 (IDW Publishing, 2017)
- The Ballad of Sang #1 (Oni Press, 2018)
- Euthanauts #5 (Black Crown, 2018)
- The Wild Storm #19 (Wildstorm, 2019)
