= COPRA Press =

American comic book publishing company

- Status: Active
- Founded: August 2011; 15 years ago
- Founder: Michel Fiffe
- Country of origin: United States
- Key people: Michel Fiffe
- Publication types: Zegas; COPRA; COPRA Versus; Negativeland
- Fiction genres: Superhero; Fantasy; Science fiction; Action; Adventure
- No. of employees: 1
- Official website: michelfiffe.com

COPRA Press is an American media company based in New York, NY.

== Publication history ==
COPRA is a self-published comic book that is written, drawn, inked, colored, lettered, edited, packed, and shipped by creator Michel Fiffe. COPRA made its internet debut on Fiffe's Etsy store on November 8, 2012. COPRA #1 made its public debut on November 10, 2012 at the Brooklyn Comics and Graphics Festival. In May 2019, COPRA Press left Bergen Street Press and began publishing with Image Comics.

== Awards ==
Year	Nominee / work	Award	Result
2018	COPRA Round Five, COPRA Versus, Negativeland	The Comics Journal: The Best Comics of 2018	Nominated
2017	Zegas	The Beat's Best Comics of 2017	Nominated
2017	Zegas	The Hundreds Best of 2017: Graphic novels	Nominated
2017	COPRA	ComicBook.com's 10 Best Indie Comics of 2017	Nominated
2017	COPRA	ComicBook.com 2017 Golden Issue Awards: Best comic series	Nominated
2016	COPRA	Comicsverse: Best Indie Comics of 2016	Nominated
2016	COPRA	Paste: The 25 Best Comic Books of 2016	Nominated
2015	COPRA	ComicBook.com's Best Comics of 2015	Nominated
2015	COPRA	The Beat's Best Comics of 2015	Nominated
2015	COPRA	ComicsAlliance Best of 2015: Continued excellence in serial comics	Nominated
2015	COPRA	Paste: The Best Comic Books of 2015	Nominated
2015	COPRA	Tech Times: The Best Comics of 2015 As Chosen by the Artists	Nominated
2014	COPRA	ComicBook.com's Best Comics of 2014	Nominated
2014	Michel Fiffe	The Newest Rant: 2014 In Review — Best writer-artist	Won
2014	COPRA	Comicosity: Best of 2014: Matt Santori's pick for best graphic novel	Won
2014	COPRA	Journeys in Darkness and Light: Best Graphic Novels Published in 2014	Nominated
2014	COPRA	The A.V. Club: The Best Comics of 2014: Ongoing and special series	Won
2014	Michel Fiffe	ComicsAlliance Reader Choice Awards: Best writer/artist	Won
2013	COPRA	Comics Bulletin: Top 10 Ongoing Series of 2013	Nominated
2013	COPRA	Brainleak Station 12: Best of 2013	Nominated
2013	COPRA	Broken Frontier Awards 2013: Best ongoing series	Nominated
2013	COPRA	CBR's Top 100 Comics of 2013	Nominated
2013	COPRA	CBR: The Ten Best Comics of 2013	Nominated
2013	COPRA	ComicsAlliance: The Best Comic Books of 2013: Best comics about squads on suicide missions	Won
2013	COPRA	Graphic Novel Universe: Best Graphic Novels of 2013	Nominated
2013	COPRA	Best of 5773	Nominated
2012	COPRA	The Comics Journal: The 19 Best Comics of 2012	Nominated
2012	COPRA	Hellboy Memorial Awards: ComicsAlliance's Best Comics of 2012: Best comics about squads on suicide missions	Won
2012	COPRA	CBR: The 10 Best Comics of 2012	Nominated
2011	Zegas	Best of 5771	Nominated
