= FIFF =

FIFF may refer to:

== Film festivals ==
- Fajr International Film Festival, Tehran, Iran
- Festival International du Film Francophone de Namur, Belgium
- Fribourg International Film Festival, Switzerland
- International Women's Film Festival (France), Créteil, France

== Other uses ==
- F Is for Family, American animated series

== See also ==
- Michel Fiffe (born 1979), Cuban–American comic book artist
