= Orc Stain =

Comic book series by James Stokoe

- Cover of Orc Stain Volume 1

Publication information
- Publisher: Image Comics
- Schedule: Bimonthly / irregular
- Format: Ongoing series
- Genre: Fantasy
- Publication date: January 2010
- No. of issues: 7
- Main character: One-Eye

Creative team
- Created by: James Stokoe
- Written by: James Stokoe
- Artist: James Stokoe

Collected editions
- Orc Stain Volume 1: ISBN 9781607062950

Orc Stain is a fantasy comic book series created by James Stokoe and published by Image Comics. The first seven issues were published from January 2010–February 2012. The first five issues were collected into a trade paperback titled Orc Stain Volume 1.

== Publication history ==
Orc Stain ran bimonthly for five issues, with issue #6 coming out 6 months after #5. Issue #7 came out nearly a year after #6. No issues have been published since February 2012.

However, in July 2015, Orc Stain creator James Stokoe promised that issues #8–10 were in production and would be released when all three issues were completed. (Covers for issues #8–10 will be illustrated by Brandon Graham, Michael DeForge, and Mickey Zacchilli).

Stokoe had said he planned to publish at least 6 volumes of Orc Stain, which at the current rate of collection comes out to around 30 total issues.

== Plot ==
Orc Stain is set in a fantasy world plagued by endless war between hordes of orcs. An orcish war chief, The Orctzar, has unified an unusually large army in the south and is pushing north. The protagonist, One-Eye, is an unusually intelligent northern orc gifted with the ability to locate the weak point in any object and use it to crack it open. When the Orctzar receives a prophecy that One-Eye will be the downfall of his empire, he begins to seek him out.

== Development ==
Orc Stain was developed as a result of Stokoe's love of The Lord of the Rings, which led him to consider whether all orcs were as simplistic and warlike as those depicted by J. R. R. Tolkien. He drew a short comic detailing an argument between two orcs about whether their brutal nature was inherent or a result of their environment, and eventually expanded the idea into Orc Stain.

== Reception ==
Orc Stain received near universal praise, both for the originality of the setting and the quality of Stokoe's art. In reviewing the first collected volume, Comic Book Resources stated that "it's exciting, funny, violent, vulgar, and absolutely gorgeous", while Comics Alliance described the art as "distinctive, with a palette that draws you in and keeps you hooked." Hypergeek stated that "James Stokoe has created a wonderfully bizarre new world for this story, which he has brought to life with his amazing artwork." Some sources have criticized the series for its ongoing delays, however; since January 2010, only seven issues have been released.

Stokoe was nominated in the Best Emerging Talent category in the 2011 Doug Wright Award for Orc Stain Volume 1.
