= Judith Poxson Fawkes =

American tapestry weaver (1941–2019)

- Born: Judith Mary Poxson; October 5, 1941; Lansing, Michigan, U.S.
- Died: June 28, 2019 (aged 77); Portland, Oregon, U.S.

Judith Poxson Fawkes (October 5, 1941 – June 28, 2019) was an American tapestry weaver based in Portland, Oregon, who exhibited her works nationally beginning in the 1960s.

== Early life and education ==
The daughter of Elijah Goute Poxon and Helen (Snow) Poxson, Judith Mary Poxson was born October 5, 1941, in Lansing Michigan. She earned a B.F.A. at Michigan State University and an M.F.A at Cranbrook Academy of Art. While at Cranbrook, she met Tom Fawkes, who became her husband of 52 years. In 1972 they moved to Portland, Oregon, and had two daughters Elizabeth and Glynnis Fawkes. She taught weaving at four colleges in Portland, including Lewis & Clark College.

== Critical reception ==
Beginning in 1989, she exhibited works at Russo Lee Gallery in Portland, Oregon. Her linen inlay, double weave and pattern weave tapestries are in the permanent collections of the American Crafts Museum, City of Seattle, Clark College, Greenville County Museum of Art, Knight Library, and Stanford University. According to the Washington State Arts Commission, Fawkes produced "elaborate woven tapestries that explore architectural and geometric forms, as well as the interplay of light and color". She was "highly regarded for her intricate tapestries", according to the Museum without Walls.

== Selected exhibitions ==
Fifty of her commissioned tapestries are exhibited nationally, in the collections of "...Mark O. Hatfield Federal Courthouse, Kaiser and Legacy Hospitals, Inverness Jail, Chapman Elementary School and Congregation Beth Israel, all in Portland, and in university and corporate buildings in Houston, San Antonio, Atlanta, New Orleans, Seattle and Jacksonville, and a Caribbean cruise ship." Her tapestries have also been exhibited in the Maryhill Museum of Art.

== Awards ==
She received the National Endowment of the Arts Regional Fellowship for Visual Artists.

== Publications ==
Fawkes, Judith Poxson (2012). Weaving a Chronicle. Schiffer. ISBN 978-0764340635.

== See also ==
- Fiber art
- Wall Hangings
