= The New Brighton Archeological Society =

- Cover of the first graphic novel
- Created by: Mark Andrew Smith; Matthew Weldon

Publication information
- Publisher: Image Comics
- Title(s): "The Castle of Galomar"
- Formats: Original material for the series has been published as a set of graphic novels.
- Genre: Fantasy
- Publication date: March 2009 – present

Creative team
- Writer(s): Mark Andrew Smith
- Artist(s): Matthew Weldon

The New Brighton Archeological Society is an original graphic novel series of books written by Mark Andrew Smith & illustrated by Matthew Weldon. The first volume, titled "The Castle of Galomar" debuted in March 2009. It is published by Image Comics.

== Plot ==
The story of the New Brighton Archeological Society follows the children from two families of the world's most famous explorers. When their parents are lost on an Archeological mission to thwart their nemesis named Galomar, the children find themselves under the care of their Godparents and living in their parents' old childhood home. During a snowball fight the children accidentally find their parents old clubhouse called "The New Brighton Archeological Society". The children start the club up again to honor their parents' memory but also find many strange books filled with information about supernatural worlds and lore.

While hiking in the woods the children find many strange runes along the trails. They bump into a Goblin puppet show and startle the children. Here they meet Mitch the Goblin who was once friends with their parents when they were their parents' age. Mitch takes them to the outskirts of the Goblin City but before they're inside there is an air raid attack by Fairie forces. The Fairies are not acting of their free will. There is a battle and the Goblin forces manage to hold off the attack.

Down in the city Mitch introduces the children to his parents who tell him the truth about their parents' nemesis Galomar and the books of magic that he wants to control. Mitch's father tells them that inside Galomar's castle they can find maps that give the location of the remaining books of magic. The castle is guarded by two Jiangshi brothers or Chinese vampires.

The children navigate underground to break into the castle through sewers and tunnels. Here they encounter monsters who are guards, the Kappa and the Red Cherufe. Mitch explains to the children that many monsters thrive on rule sets. The key to beating the Kappa is to bow a deep bow of respect that he must return and then spill the water in his head. With the Red Cherufe, they must play soothing music on the violin to put him to sleep as they pass.

Inside the castle the children find the maps of magic as well as magical rings. They also find a slug named Neal who is an old friend of Mitch the Goblin. Inside the castle the Chinese vampires are awakened and they chase the children who narrowly escape.

With the maps in hand the children set out on a Goblin Zeppelin to beat Galomar to the books and to finish their parents' work.
