= Mayday Trippe =

American comic book artist

- Areas: Writer, Penciller, Inker, Colourist
- Notable works: Butterfly; Power Lunch; Comic Book Tattoo

Mayday "Dean" Trippe is a United States–based comic book artist and illustrator. Trippe graduated from the Savannah College of Art and Design with a B.F.A. in Sequential Art in 2003.

== Work ==
Along with Jamie Dee Galey, Trippe was also one of the instigators of the 2005 Batgirl Livejournal Meme, which grew into a phenomenon of over 1000 artists contributing their own unique renditions of DC Comics' Batgirl.

With writer Chris Arrant, they co-founded Project: Rooftop, a website devoted to original redesigns of classic American comic book characters.

Trippe started a Kickstarter campaign in 2014 to publish Something Terrible, an autobiographical comic about child abuse and sexual violence. After several months of delays. angry supporters and radio silence from the author, they made a deal with Iron Circus Comics. The work was distributed by Iron Circus Comics.

In September 2015, Trippe illustrated the cover of the scientific journal Nature, in which they designed a team of superheroes representing areas of knowledge (economics, psychology, astronomy, quantum mechanics, medicine, computer science, and Evolutionary biology) that also is used in an editorial and a special issue. Trippe also illustrated a variant for another article within the issue.

== Personal life ==
Trippe came out as non-binary in 2021.

They are a member of the Democratic Socialists of America.

== Bibliography ==
- Something Terrible Comic autobiography of Trippe and their struggles. Self-published.
- Power Lunch Book 1: First Course (with writer J. Torres, Oni Press, 2011, ISBN 1-934964-70-0)
- Knock Knock Joke of the book with Paul and Jack short story in Yo Gabba Gabba: Comic Book Time! (Oni Press, 2011)
- Butterfly, a superhero parody webcomic
- Merman Short Story in Comic Book Tattoo (with Jason Horn, Image Comics, 2008, ISBN 1-60706-031-0)
- Wake, a serialized webcomic for Act-i-vate
- Butterfly Origin in Superior Showcase #1 (AdHouse Books, 2006)
- Untitled short story in You Ain't No Dancer, Vol. 1 (New Reliable Press, 2005, ISBN 0-9738079-0-3)
- Untitled short story in 2005 FLUKE Anthology
