= Palle Schmidt =

Palle Schmidt (born 1972) is a Danish comic book artist, illustrator and author.

== Biography ==
Palle Schmidt began his career in the 1990s as an illustrator and writer for the roleplaying magazine Fønix and in 1999 he published his first comic book in Danish.

His stories are often set in a dark and crime ridden noir-world. The two graphic novels The Devil’s Concubine and STILETTO are the most prominent examples of this. In 2014 STILETTO was nominated for the Danish prize Pingprisen.

Palle Schmidt received international attention when he collaborated with the American comic book writer Chris Miskiewicz on Thomas Alsop for Boom! Studios which USA Today called the miniseries of the year.

He has worked on graphic novels written by Danish authors as well. Among them are Diego & Dolly written by Jesper Wung-Sung and the comic book adaption of A. J. Kazinski’s award winning crime novel The Last Good Man.

In parallel with the comics, Palle Schmidt has published a number of YA novels in Danish and made illustrations for children’s books by other authors. He has also worked on storyboards. In 2014 he contributed to the interior art for the Ghostface Killah album (and comic) 36 Seasons (2014).

== Bibliography ==
- The Devil’s Concubine (IDW Pub. 2011)
- STILETTO (Thrillbent 2015; Lion Forge 2019)

=== With Chris Miskiewicz ===
- Fish Everywhere (ACT-I-VATE 2011)
- Thomas Alsop: The Case of Dead Uncle (Trip City 2012)
- Thomas Alsop (Boom! Studios 2014)
- Thomas Alsop TPB vol. 1: The Hand of the Island (Boom! Studios 2015)
- Thomas Alsop TBP vol. 2: The 3000 (Boom! Studios 2016)

== Personal life ==
Palle Schmidt lives in Copenhagen, Denmark with his wife Line Leonhardt and his two daughters.
