= Popgun (comics) =

Comics anthology series

- Cover of the first collection.

Publication information
- Publisher: Image Comics
- Schedule: Annual
- Format: Ongoing series
- Publication date: 2007-2010
- No. of issues: 4
- Editor(s): Mark Andrew Smith; Joe Keatinge; D.J. Kirkbride; Anthony Wu; Adam P. Knave

Popgun is a comics anthology series created by Mark Andrew Smith and Joe Keatinge. It was published by American company Image Comics in four volumes, between 2007 and 2010. The driving concept behind Popgun was a mixtape of graphic short stories that cross the borders of all genres. No theme was given to contributors and instead emphasis is placed on diversity of content and the mixing/track order of each volume.

Popgun featured many well-known creators as well as showcased brand-new talent who were not widely known at the time. Many creators debuting in Popgun have since made their mark on the comics industry. Popgun twice won the Harvey Award for best anthology, and won the Eisner Award for Best Anthology in 2010.

== Publication ==
Popgun volume 1 was edited by Mark Andrew Smith and Joe Keatinge. Mike Allred illustrated the cover of the first volume. The first volume of Popgun was released on November 28, 2007.

Popgun volume 2 featured, among others, the work of Ulises Fariñas, Michel Fiffe, Dean Haspiel, Tim Hamilton, Dan Goldman, Paul Maybury, and Nikki Cook from the webcomics collective ACT-I-VATE. Paul Pope illustrated the cover for volume 2, which was edited by Joe Keatinge and Mark Andrew Smith. Volume 2 was released on July 25, 2008.

Popgun volume 3 was released in March 2009, featuring a cover by Tara McPherson. It was edited by Mark Andrew Smith and D.J. Kirkbride.

Popgun volume 4 was released in February 2010. It featured a cover by Ben Templesmith and was edited by D.J. Kirkbride, Anthony Wu, and Adam P. Knave.

== Awards ==
- 2008: Popgun vol. 1 — Harvey Award for Best Anthology
- 2009: Popgun vol. 2 — Harvey Award for Best Anthology (nomination)
- 2010:
  - Popgun vol. 3 — Diamond Gem Award for Best Anthology (nomination)
  - Popgun vol. 3 — Eisner Award for Best Anthology
  - Popgun vol. 3 — Harvey Award for Best Anthology (nomination)
- 2011: Popgun vol. 4 — Harvey Award for Best Anthology

== Volumes ==
- Popgun Volume One: ISBN 1-58240-824-6
- Popgun Volume Two: ISBN 1-58240-920-X
- Popgun Volume Three: ISBN 1-58240-974-9
- Popgun Volume Four: ISBN 1-60706-188-0
