= Shackleton: Antarctic Odyssey =

2014 graphic novel by Nick Bertozzi

- Date: 2014
- Publisher: First Second Books

Creative team
- Writers: Nick Bertozzi
- Artists: Nick Bertozzi
- ISBN: 978-1-59643-451-6

Shackleton: Antarctic Odyssey is a graphic novel published in 2014 by First Second. Written and illustrated by Nick Bertozzi, the graphic novel focuses on Ernest Shackleton and his crew during the Imperial Trans-Antarctic Expedition of 1914. The book was published during the 100th anniversary of the expedition

Given the historical nature of the story, Bertozzi includes the information resources he utilized for readers in the back of the book. His list of resources includes numerous publications and websites along with the Herreshoff Marine Museum/ America's Cup Hall of Fame. Bertozzi mentions the inspiration for his illustrations of the arctic as being derivative of the photographs taken by Frank Hurley, the staff photographer and the paintings by George Marston, the staff artist on the Imperial Trans-Antarctic Expedition. The majority of the dialogue in the story is imagined exposition by Bertozzi, though he notes in an interview with National Geographic that he also incorporated some dialogue from Ernest Shackleton's book South.

== Summary ==
The story begins with a brief history of the "Heroic Age of Antarctic Exploration" in which the two page spread of illustrations and text guide the reader through the first experiences of Ernest Shackleton with Antarctic expeditions up until his proposed "Plan of Imperial trans-Antarctic Expedition 1914-1916". The main storyline begins with then Lieutenant, Ernest Shackleton, on the Discovery Expedition of 1901 led by Robert Falcon Scott. Bertozzi then takes the reader through the time leading up to the main expedition, including Shackleton's funding efforts along with his wife Emily's trepidation over the journey.

Moving forward Bertozzi gets to the stranding of the 28 member crew when their ship the Endurance becomes lodged in the ice. At this point Bertozzi begins to highlight the crew's attitude as they play soccer on the ice and hold theatrical performances as they try their best to make it through the arctic winter. The story works through the entire journey of Shackleton and his men as they struggled to stay alive although it is obviously condensed to fit the graphic novel format. Ultimately Shackleton makes it to Stromness Station where he arranges to rescue the remainder of the crew. The Antarctic expedition lasted from 1914 to 1917 in which time not a single crew member was lost, though all of the crews 34 dogs perished or were shot due to concerns over resources.

== Reviews ==
In a review by Sarah Harrison Smith of the New York Times, Shackleton: Antarctic Odyssey is praised for its ability to emphasize the importance of Shackleton's team in their overall survival Harrison also praises the Bertozzi for taking into consideration the maturity of his audience without condescension when covering the historical fact of how the last surviving dog on the expedition never made it home,

Bertozzi keeps the youth of his readers in mind, and treads carefully around this gruesome event, showing the men's loving embrace of the dog and anguish at the sound of the distant shot that heralds his death. That the dog is then butchered for the men to eat is implied but not stressed, a kindness – but not a condescension to – the young adults for whom "Shackleton" is intended.

The only element within the storyline that detracted from the overall story, according to Harrison, was the use of seafaring terms that may be unfamiliar to the readers. However, Harrison notes that the limitations with the format of the graphic novel, such as the lack of a narrator, are what make the use of seafaring terms difficult to explain within the text. She adds that the illustrations are often enough to guide and keep the reader engaged while working through the unknown terms.

In another review by Hillary Brown for Paste Magazine, Bertozzi is lauded for being able to make light of the fairly unpleasant situation within the graphic novel. Brown notes that Bertozzi captures the good-nature of the crew's attitudes, which is recognized as one of the assets to their survival. She also notes that the comic's rare structure and range of panel layouts is beneficial to the driving quality of the storyline, "The variety of panel layouts deserves particular recognition. It's rare to see such a range of structures, especially within such a limited number of pages, but Bertozzi's determination to keep his story fresh lends energy to the tale."

It received a starred review in the Children's book section on Publishers Weekly where it was described as "must-read for history buffs". It also received a starred review in Kirkus Reviews, where it was recommended for ages 10 to 16.
