= The Salon (comics) =

Graphic novel by Nick Bertozzi

Publication information
- Publisher: St. Martin's Press
- Genre: Historical fiction Mystery
- Publication date: April 2007

Creative team
- Created by: Nick Bertozzi

The Salon is a graphic novel written and illustrated by Nick Bertozzi. Originally published in installments on the website Serializer.net in 2002, it was eventually published in its entirety by St. Martin's Press in April 2007.

== Plot ==
The story is set in 1907 in Paris, surrounding the birth of the Cubism art movement. Someone is murdering various painters, and a group forms to solve the mystery. Fictionalized characters include Pablo Picasso, Georges Braque, Gertrude Stein, and Erik Satie.

== Development ==
After The Salon was published by St. Martin's Press, Bertozzi noted that the comic had changed substantially since it was originally published on Serializer.net, with plot points tightened, more than 20 pages cut and about 40 pages added.

== Reception ==
The Salon has been praised for its "rich personalities" and "brilliant premise". Publishers Weekly said the novel was executed "with wit and flair. The Salon was named on the Publishers Weekly list of best comics of 2007.

== Historical accuracy ==
A scene in the book shows Picasso taking inspiration from a comic to complete a portrait of Gertrude Stein. While Picasso was a fan of William Randolph Hearst's comics, there is no historical evidence that they influenced his art. Bertozzi said of the comic, "Researching the personalities in The Salon led less to historical accuracy in terms of dates and places, but more, I feel, to an emotional reality".

== Controversy ==
An excerpt of The Salon containing a nude depiction of Picasso was included in a compilation called Alternative Comics No. 2 in 2004. The compilation was given away as part of a promotional event in Rome, Georgia by comic store owner Gordon Lee. The compilation was given to a child, whose parents reported the incident. Lee was soon charged with two counts of "distributing material depicting nudity or sexual conduct" and five counts of "distributing obscene material" to a minor. The Comic Book Legal Defense Fund noticed the case and provided Lee's defense. Over $100,000 was spent, and the case was dismissed in April 2008.
