= Glynnis Fawkes =

American cartoonist and illustrator

- Born: 1969 (age 56–57)
- Notable work: Charlotte Bronte Before Jane Eyre, Persephone's Garden, 1177 B.C.: A Graphic History of the Year Civilization Collapsed
- Children: Helen Franklin, Sylvan Franklin
- Website: http://www.glynnisfawkes.com/about

Glynnis Fawkes is an American cartoonist, author, and archaeological illustrator. She is best known for her cartoons featured in the New Yorker, graphic memoirs, and comics about ancient civilizations and mythology. She lives in Burlington, Vermont.

== Personal life ==
Glynnis Fawkes was born in 1969 to Tom Fawkes and Judith Poxson Fawkes. She was raised in Oregon along with her sister Elizabeth Fawkes. Her father was a painter and taught at Pacific NorthWest College of Art, where she would later attend. Her mother was a weaver and textile artist; her relationship with her mother and her progressing Alzheimer’s disease was the primary subject of her graphic memoir Persephone's Garden. She has two children, daughter Helen and son Sylvan.

== Education ==
Glynnis Fawkes received her bachelors of art from the University of Oregon and her bachelors of fine art from Pacific NorthWest College of Art in painting. She has extensively studied classical languages such as Russian, Greek and Italian, as well as received a degree in Arts and Letters. She went on to receive her masters of fine art from the School of the Museum of Fine Arts and Tufts University in painting. She received the Fulbright Fellowship in 1998 on which she went to Cyprus, where she started her career in archeology. While on the Fulbright Fellowship she produced her first two books, Cartoons of Cyprus, a collection of paintings, and Archaeology Lives in Cyprus.

== Career ==
Glynnis Fawkes started her career as an archaeology illustrator. She has worked on various archaeology sites across the Mediterranean and Middle East including Crete, Greece, Cyprus, Turkey, Israel, Syria, and Lebanon. Though not an archaeologist herself she worked alongside archaeologists providing detailed scientific illustrations of artifacts. This technical archaeology drawing style can be seen in many of her works. Her experience as an archaeologist illustrator has become a common topic of discussion in her cartoons and books.

Fawkes began drawing cartoons professionally after nearly a decade of archeology work. Her cartoons regularly appear in the New Yorker and Mutha Magazine, and have been published in Act-i-vate and the Burlington Press. Many of her cartoons are autobiographical focusing on parenthood, marriage, aging parents, and working abroad. She has been teaching at the Center for Cartoon Studies since 2019.

Glynnis Fawkes has held two residencies at La Maison des Auteurs in Angoulême, France, the first of which in 2015 and the other in 2017. Her first residency in 2015 is the subject of her first autobiographical graphic novel, Alle Ego. During her second residency she produced the first draft of Asara of Thera.

== Major works ==
=== Cartoons of Cyprus ===
Published in 2001 by Mouflon Publications. Cartoons of Cyprus was Fawkes' first book and was produced as part of her Fulbright Fellowship. The book contains seventy ink drawings about Cypriot archaeology.

=== Archaeology Lives in Cyprus ===
Published in 2001 by Hellenic Bank. Both Archaeology Lives in Cyprus and Cartoons of Cyprus were produced during Fawkes' Fulbright Fellowship in Cyprus, and they were originally planned to be published together. Archaeology Lives in Cyprus contains multimedia scenes of Cypriot archaeology that blend photography and painting along with commentary on excavations.

=== Alle Ego ===
Published January 1st, 2016. Alle Ego is a graphic novel that tells the story of Glynnis Fawkes' time in Greece working on archeological sites starting with her first trip as a student. Alle Ego won the MoCCA Arts Festival Award of Excellence in 2016.

=== Greek Diary ===
The Greek Diary was originally posted online as a series of cartoons but was published as a paperback on April 1, 2017. The Greek Diary was written during Glynnis Fawkes' time in Greece in the summer of 2016 while working on an excavation site in Kenchreai, Greece. The graphic memoir illustrates Fawkes' time traveling with her husband and children, while trying to manage young children in difficult travel situations and reminiciting on meeting her husband in Greece.

=== Reign of Crumbs ===
Published June 1st, 2017 by Kilgore Books. Reign of Crumbs is a graphic memoir that focuses on Glynnis Fawkes' experience with parenthood raising her two children in Burlington, Vermont, and abroad in the Middle East. The book is made up of short slice of life comics, including comics previously featured in Mutha Magazine.

=== Charlotte Brontë Before Jane Eyre ===
Published in 2019 by Disney Hyperion. Charlotte Brontë Before Jane Eyre is a biographical graphic novel about Jane Eyre's author, Charlotte Bronte, with an introduction by Allison Bechdel. The biography parallels the life of Charlotte Bronte with the fictional narrative of Jane Eyre, emphasizing themes of loss, the relationship between sisters, and abuse. The struggles Charlotte Bronte faced as a female author in a patriarchal society are also highlighted. The book was written as part of the Center for Cartoon Studies Presents collection, a series of young adult graphic novels presenting biographies of historical figures.

=== Persephone's Garden ===
Published in 2019 by Secret Acres, Persephone's Garden is written and illustrated by Glynnis Fawkes. Persephone's Garden is a collection of cartoons from 2012 to 2018 varying in length from four panel comics to longer chapters. The memoir covers Fawkes' experiences with girlhood, womanhood, motherhood, living abroad, and working in the field of archaeology through everyday commonplace memories, along the backdrop of her mother's progressing Alzheimer's disease. The memoir connects these seemingly minute moments to explore what happens when you lose the memories that make up your life and how archaeologists are unable to fully reconstruct the lives of people from small pieces of information gleaned from artifacts.

=== 1177 B.C.: A Graphic History ===
Published by Princeton University Press in 2024. Fawkes adapted Eric H Cline’s 1177 BC The Year Civilization Collapsed (2014) in graphic novel format. Glynnis co-authors the book along with Eric H Cline and provides the illustrations as well as new dialogue. 1177 BC: A Graphic Novel is a middle grade graphic novel about the collapse of Bronze Age Civilization. The novel is narrated by two fictional characters, Shesha, an Egyptian scribe, and Pel, a member of nomadic sea people. They visit the kingdoms of the Minoans, Mycenaeans, Hittites, Canaanites, Assyrians, and Egyptians to explore the various catastrophes that resulted in societal collapse. The novel portrays the collapse of the Bronze Age as a result of various factors such as drought, famine, evasion, disease, and volcanic eruption, instead of a single cause.

=== Asara of Thera ===
Asara of Thera is a middle grade graphic novel set in Bronze Age Santorini about a family of artists who are separated by the cataclysmic eruption of Thera. The first draft of the graphic novel was completed during Fawkes' second residency at La Maison des Auteurs in Angoulême, France. Written and illustrated by Glynnis Fawkes, Asara of Thera is set to be the author's first work of fiction. The book is set to be released in 2027 by Holiday House.

== Additional works ==
- The Homeric Hymn to Aphrodite (Lulu Press, 2014) – Translated by Gregory Nagy, Illustrations by Glynnis Fawkes.
- The Homeric Hymn to Dionysos (Lulu Press, 2015) – Translated by Gregory Nagy, Illustrations by Glynnis Fawkes.
- Kinyras: The Divine Lyre, John Curtis Franklin (Center for Hellenistic Studies, 2016, ISBN 978-0-674-08830-6) – Illustrations by Glynnis Fawkes.
- The Book of Greek and Roman Folktales, Legends, and Myths (Princeton University Press, 2017, ISBN 978-1-4008-8467-4) – Illustrations by Glynnis Fawkes.
- Three Stones Make a Wall, Eric H. Cline (Princeton University Press, 2017, ISBN 978-0-691-16640-7) – Illustrations by Glynnis Fawkes.
- Someone’s Gonna End Up Crying, Jo Knowles (Penguin Random House, expected 2025, ISBN 978-1-5362-3127-4) – Illustrations by Glynnis Fawkes.
- Mudhouse (Paper Rocker Comics, 2026), Minicomics.

== Awards ==
- 2013 the Sequential Artists Workshop grant
- 2016 Alle Ego won MoCCA Arts Festival Award of Excellence
- 2016 Greek Diary, Shortlisted for the Slate Cartoonist Studio Prize
- 2016 nominated for an Ignatz Award in the category Outstanding Online Comic for Just Doing My Job
- 2017 Greek Diary won a silver medal at the MoCCA Arts Festival
- 2017 nominated for the Slate Cartoonist Studio Prize for Greek Diary
- 2019-20 Vermont Arts Council Creation Grant
- 2026 Nominated for Ignatz prize in Outstanding story category for Mudhouse.
- 2026 Winner of the Paper Rocket Publishing Prize for Mudhouse.

== Bibliography ==
- “Alle Ego.” Goodreads. Accessed January 31, 2025. https://www.goodreads.com/book/show/210415009-alle-ego.
- Berlatsky, Noah. “Persephone's Garden.” The Comics Journal. October 1, 2019. https://www.tcj.com/reviews/persephones-garden/.
- Brogan, Jacob. “Announcing the Winner of the Fifth Cartoonist Studio Prize.” Slate. April 10, 2017. https://slate.com/culture/2017/04/cartoonist-studio-prize-2017-winners-eleanor-davis-and-christina-tran.html.
- Brogan, Jacob. “The Cartoonist Studio Prize Shortlist.” Slate. March 17, 2017. https://slate.com/culture/2017/03/the-cartoonist-studio-prize-shortlist-for-2017.html.
- “Cartoons of Cyprus.” Moufflon Bookshop. Accessed February 28, 2025. https://www.google.com/url?sa=t&source=web&rct=j&opi=89978449&url=https://moufflon.com.cy/product/cartoons-of-cyprus/&ved=2ahUKEwjk4eqJ5eeLAxVwkIkEHRA2LvAQFnoECEcQAQ&usg=AOvVaw1ff5nOuaPJ5FeA1S58-1TR.
- Cavna, Michael. “Small Press Expo Here are your 2016 Ignatz Award winners including new talent Tillie Walden.” Washington Post. September 18, 2016. https://www.washingtonpost.com/news/comic-riffs/wp/2016/09/18/small-press-expo-here-are-your-2016-ignatz-award-winners-including-new-talent-tillie-walden/?variant=d846d44221ecba95.
- Diaz, Shelley M. “Fawkes, Glynnis. Charlotte Bronte Before Jane Eyre.” School Library Journal (New York, N.Y.). Library Journals, LLC, 2019.
- Fisher, April. “From archeology sites to comic book pages: Burlington cartoonist Glynnis Fawkes.” Burlington Free Press. January 19, 2023. https://www.burlingtonfreepress.com/story/life/2023/01/19/from-artifact-to-comic-book-art-burlington-cartoonist-glynnis-fawkes/69815288007/.
- “Glynnis Fawkes, Author at Mutha Magazine.” Mutha Magazine. Accessed January 31, 2025. https://www.muthamagazine.com/author/glynnis-fawkes/.
- “Glynnis Fawkes.” Secret Acres. Accessed February 28, 2025. http://secretacres.com/?page_id=5283.
- “Glynnis Fawkes Joins CCS Faculty This Fall.” The Center for Cartoon Studies. August 30, 2019. https://www.cartoonstudies.org/glynnis-fawkes-joins-ccs-faculty-this-fall/.
- Gosden, Chris. “Collapse and rise: Can the end of the Bronze Age teach us how to survive?” TLS. Times Literary Supplement, no. 6327 (2024): 22. Gale Academic OneFile. Accessed February 29, 2025. https://go-gale-com.proxy.queensu.ca/ps/i.do?p=AONE&u=queensulaw&id=GALE%7CA800171470&v=2.1&it=r&aty=ip.
- “Graphic Memoir Panel (Burlington).” Phoenix Books. Accessed February 27, 2025. https://www.phoenixbooks.biz/event/graphic-memoir-panel-burlington.
- Grayson, Margaret. “Cartoonist Glynnis Fawkes Marks a Two-Book Year.” Seven days Vermount’s Independent Voice. December 18, 2019. https://www.sevendaysvt.com/arts-culture/cartoonist-glynnis-fawkes-marks-a-two-book-year-29198325.
- “In Stores Now: Charlotte Bronte Before Jane Eyre By CCS Faculty Glynnis Fawkes.” The Center for Cartoon Studies. September 24, 2019. https://www.cartoonstudies.org/in-stores-now-charlotte-bronte-before-jane-eyre-by-ccs-faculty-glynnis-fawkes/.
- Kirby, Robert. “Greek Diary.” The Comics Journal. August 14, 2017. https://www.tcj.com/reviews/greek-diary/.
- “Judith Fawkes Obituary (2019) - Portland, OR - the Oregonian.” Legacy.com. Accessed February 28, 2025. https://obits.oregonlive.com/us/obituaries/oregon/name/judith-fawkes-obituary?id=14201638.
- “Landscapes of Myth and Memory.” The Center for Hellenic Studies. Accessed February 25, 2025. https://chs.harvard.edu/glynnis-fawkes-landscapes-of-myth-and-memory/.
- Leong, Sloane. “‘I Left with the Mission to Level Up’: Sloane Leong Talks to Glynnis Fawkes.” The Comics Journal. TCJ, May 3, 2019. https://www.tcj.com/sloane-leong-talks-to-glynnis-fawkes/.
- “Next Up Visiting Artist: Glynnis Fawkes.” Center for Cartoon Studies. Accessed February 25, 2025. https://www.cartoonstudies.org/tag/cartoons-of-cyprus/.
- “Reign of Crumbs.” Birdcage Bottom Books. Accessed February 28, 2025. https://www.birdcagebottombooks.com/products/reign-of-crumbs.
- “Reign of Crumb: Glynnis Fawkes.” Broken Frontier. Accessed February 28, 2025. https://www.brokenfrontier.com/glynnis-fawkes-reign-crumbs-kilgore-books/.
- “Spring Eisner Lecture: Jillian Tamaki in Conversation with Glynnis Fawkes.” The Center for Cartoon Studies. Accessed February 24, 2025. https://www.cartoonstudies.org/spring-eisner-lecture-jillian-tamaki-in-conversation-with-glynnis-fawkes/.
- “1177 B.C.: A Graphic History of the Year Civilization Collapsed.” Ancient World. Princeton University Press. Accessed February 17, 2025. https://press.princeton.edu/books/paperback/9780691213026/1177-bc?srsltid=AfmBOorsusGizlWIBlceLeLZCyY9kyI6eor3xRv0ebh6Lv8V8A1zwRid.
- “1177 BC Graphic Novel from Glynnis Fawkes.” The Center for Cartoon Studies. Accessed February 28, 2025. https://www.cartoonstudies.org/1177-bc-graphic-novel-from-glynnis-fawkes/.
