= Mike Cavallaro =

American comic book writer and artist

- Born: New Jersey, U.S.
- Areas: Writer, Artist, Colourist
- Notable works: Parade (with Fireworks); The Life and Times of Savior 28; Foiled and Curse! Foiled Again; Nico Bravo series
- Collaborators: J. M. DeMatteis; Jane Yolen

Mike Cavallaro is an American comic book writer and artist. His most notable work is in the realm of middle grade comics, including collaborations with Jane Yolen and his own graphic novel series Nico Bravo (both published by First Second Books).

Cavallaro grew up in New Jersey. He attended The Kubert School. He has performed in punk bands in the New Jersey area, and has a song on the 1995 The Bouncing Souls' album Maniacal Laughter.

He is the author of the semi-autobiographical Parade (with Fireworks), which debuted on the webcomics collective Act-i-vate and was later collected as an Eisner Award-nominated two-issue limited series by Image Comics.

Cavallaro has collaborated with comics writer J. M. DeMatteis on a number of projects, most notably The Life and Times of Savior 28, published by IDW Publishing in 2009; as well as a story in Occupy Comics #1 (Black Mask Studios, 2013), Shield backup stories in The Fox vol. 1 (Archie Comics, 2013–2014), and Impossible, Incorporated (IDW, 2018–2019).

Cavallaro is a faculty member of the School of Visual Arts. He is Vice-Chairman of the Manhattan Chapter of the National Cartoonists Society.

== Awards ==
- 2008 Eisner Award nomination for Best Limited Series for Parade (with Fireworks)
- 2008 Young Adult Library Services Association [YALSA] Great Graphic Novels For Teens selection for Parade (with Fireworks)
- 2010 Graphic Novel Reporter Best of 2010 selection for Foiled
- 2011 Amelia Bloomer Project Recommended Reading List selection for Foiled
- 2011 YALSA Great Graphic Novel for Teens selection for Foiled
- 2019 New York Public Library Best of 2019 list for Nico Bravo and the Hound of Hades

== Bibliography ==
=== Solo projects ===
- Parade (with Fireworks), 2 issues (Image Comics, 2007)
- Nico Bravo and the Hound of Hades (First Second, 2019) ISBN 978-1626727519
- Nico Bravo and the Cellar Dwellers (First Second, 2020) ISBN 978-1250220370

=== Graphic novels ===
- (art) Foiled (First Second Books, 2010) — with Jane Yolen ISBN 978-1596432796
- (art) Curses! Foiled Again (First Second, 2013) — with Jane Yolen ISBN 978-1596436190
- (art) Decelerate Blue (First Second, 2017) — with Adam Rapp ISBN 978-1596431096

=== Other comics/illustration work ===
- (art) The Life and Times of Savior 28, 5 issues (IDW Publishing, 2009) — with J. M. DeMatteis
- (colors) Hercules: Twilight of a God #1 (Marvel Comics, 2010)
- (art) Savage Dragon #171 (Image Comics, 2011) — one-page story with Joe Keatinge
- (art) The Dark Knight: Batman Fights the Joker Virus (DC Comics, 2013) — with Scott Peterson
- (art) The Man of Steel: Superman Battles Parasite's Feeding Frenzy (DC Comics, 2013) — with Scott Peterson
- (art) The Man of Steel: Superman vs. the Moon Bandits (DC Comics, 2013) — with Scott Sonneborn
- (art) The Man of Steel: Superman and the Poisoned Planet (DC Comics, 2013) — with Matthew K. Manning
- (art) "That Which Is Most Needed," in Occupy Comics #1 (Black Mask Studios, 2013) — with J. M. DeMatteis
- (art) The Shield backup stories in The Fox vol. 1, 5 issues (Archie Comics, 2013–2014) — with J. M. DeMatteis and Terry Austin
- (art) Mega Man 7: Blackout: The Curse of Ra Moon (Archie Comics, 2014) — with Ian Flynn and Patrick Spaziante
- (art) Impossible, Incorporated, 5 issues (IDW, 2018–2019) — with J. M. DeMatteis
