= Paul Maybury =

American comic book creator (born 1982)

Paul Maybury (born 1982 in Boston) is an American comic book creator living in Austin, Texas.

== Biography ==
Paul Maybury is an American comic book creator living in Austin Texas. Notable works include, Aqua Leung, Catalyst Comix, Blue Estate, Marvel Strange Tales and Sovereign.

== Bibliography ==
=== Comics ===
- Elks Run #2: "All the wrong choices" (with writers Chris Fabulous and Jason Rodriquez, for Hoarse and Buggy, 2005)
- 24seven: "Things Run Amuck" (with writer Mark Andrew Smith, Image Comics, 2006)
- The Wicked West 2: "A Man With A Stake In His Hand" (artist, writer Image Comics, 2006)
- Put the book back on the shelf: "Ninja No!" (with writer Mark Andrew Smith, Image Comics, 2006)
- 24seven volume 2: "Give Me Some Colour" (artist, writer Image Comics, 2007)
- Popgun: "Aqua Leung, Ambush" (with writer Mark Andrew Smith, Image Comics, 2007)
- Aqua Leung (with writer Mark Andrew Smith, graphic novel, for Image Comics, 2008)
- Popgun 2: "Prey On You" (writer/colorist with artist Nikki Cook, Image Comics, 2008)
- Popgun 2: "Little Known Fact" (with writer Benito Cereno, Image Comics, 2008)
- Comic Book Tattoo: "Crucify" (artist, writer Image Comics, 2008)
- Crack Comics: "The Clock Strikes", anthology for Image Comics, 2009)
- Blue Estate (with writer Viktor Kalvachev, three issues, for Image Comics, 2010)
- Eat That Frog: (with writers Cullen Bunn & Brian Tracy, graphic novel for Smarter Comics, 2011)
- D.O.G.S. of Mars: (with writers Tony Trov, Johnny Zito & Christian Weiser, graphic novel for Image Comics, 2012)
- Twisted Savage Dragon Funnies: "Wrong Turn" (with artist Giannis Milogiannis, anthology for Image Comics, 2012)
- Spera Volume 2: "Secrets", anthology for Image Comics, 2012)
- Atomic Robo: Real Science Adventures: (with writer Brian Clevinger, anthology for Red 5 Comics, 2013)
- Catalyst Comix (with writer Joe Casey, nine issue maxi series, for Dark Horse Comics, 2013-2014)
- Sovereign (with writer Chris Roberson, ongoing series, for Image Comics, 2014–present)
- Valhalla Mad (with writer Joe Casey, ongoing series, for Image Comics, 2015)

=== Web comics ===
- Party Bear (artist/writer, ACT-I-VATE, 2006-2007)
- Adventures of Maxy J. Millionaire (artist/writer, Zuda, 2007)

=== Illustrations ===
Paul Maybury has contributed illustrations to the following projects

- Winter Survival Guide, Columbus day special cover and 2006 Election special and various others for The Weekly Dig
- All Tomorrow's Parties Criterion Collection

== Awards ==
- Association of Alternative Newsweeklies Award: Best Editorial Layout, Weekly Dig ("Slumber Party") (2007)
