= Parade (with Fireworks) =

2007 comic miniseries by Mike Cavallaro

- Cover to Parade (with Fireworks) #1, September 2007.

Publication information
- Publisher: Image Comics
- Schedule: Monthly
- Format: Mini-series
- Publication date: September - October 2007
- No. of issues: 2

Creative team
- Created by: Mike Cavallaro
- Written by: Mike Cavallaro
- Artist: Mike Cavallaro

Parade (with Fireworks) is a two-issue comic book mini-series by Brooklyn based writer-artist Mike Cavallaro. It was published by Image Comics in Fall 2007. It was nominated for an Eisner Award for Best Limited Series in 2008.

== Publication history ==
Parade (with Fireworks) was originally a webcomic published one page at a time, for free, on Act-i-vate, but proved popular enough to interest a traditional print-comic publisher, Image Comics' ShadowLine imprint, in releasing an edition (with only slight alterations from the original).

According to Cavallaro, the plot is based on the true stories of his own family's history, specifically an event that occurred in his father's home town Maropati in 1923. The character of Paolo is modeled after Cavallaro's paternal grandfather.

The story is part of a projected larger arc titled "Seven Years without the Sun", meant to chronicle a whole host of Cavallaro's family stories passed down by oral tradition.

== Plot ==
The story is set in Italy between the two world wars. A local man, Paolo, travels to Chicago to open an olive oil business, but returns to his Italian home town due to the violence of the then-gang-infested Chicago.

Returning home, Paolo gets involved in the conflict between local members of Italy's fascist NFP and his family, which supports the socialist cause. He winds up in hiding after killing one of the belligerent fascists during their violent confrontation with his family on the evening of the Feast of the Epiphany. Paolo later goes on trial for the murder.
