= The Life and Times of Savior 28 =

Comic book series

- Cover of The Life and Times of Savior 28 #1

Publication information
- Publisher: IDW Publishing
- Schedule: Monthly
- Format: Limited series
- Genre: Superhero
- Publication date: March – September 2009
- No. of issues: 5

Creative team
- Written by: J.M. DeMatteis
- Artist: Mike Cavallaro
- Letterer: Neil Uyetake
- Colorist: Andrew Covalt
- Editor(s): Scott Dunbier; Chris Ryall

Collected editions
- The Life and Times of Savior 28: ISBN 1-60010-576-9

The Life and Times of Savior 28, is a five-issue comic book limited series by J.M. DeMatteis, with the artwork by Mike Cavallaro. It was published by IDW Publishing.

The story deals with Savior 28, a Golden Age superhero who over the course of seven decades renounces violence: "'To be... or not to be!' How can a man go on living when everything he's ever believed is revealed as a lie? That's the question Savior 28 is forced to ask as we follow him across the decades, from the ashes of Buchenwald to the ashes of 9/11 in this exploration of the dark underbelly of the super hero dream."

== Publication history ==
=== Background ===
In an interview, writer DeMatteis discussed the impetus for Savior 28:

'S-28' has a direct line to my past work. The idea grew out of something I wanted to do 25 years ago when I was writing Captain America — a storyline the Powers That Be didn't allow me to do. Believe it or not, I've been working on the idea ever since, developing it far beyond those original 1980s notions. The story, at its core, has to do with violence in superhero comics, in pop culture in general and, ultimately, in our world. Despite my deep love of the genre, I've always had a problem with the violent content in superhero comics; the mindset that, however much we struggle to disguise it, says 'All problems are ultimately solved by dropping a building on a so-called bad guy's head.' It's a dangerous concept, especially in a world where too many of our political leaders seem to have the same black and white vision. 'Hey, those guys over there are "evildoers," so let's bomb the hell out of them because we're the "good guys" fighting for truth and freedom.' 'Savior 28' grew out of my desire to craft a story that would face this issue head-on. As I continued to develop the idea, it grew into a saga that spanned seventy years of American pop culture and politics.

== Collected editions ==
The Life and Times of Savior 28 has been published as a trade paperback (ISBN 1600105769).
