= Marian Churchland =

Canadian comic book artist

- Born: June 15, 1982 (age 44) Vancouver, British Columbia
- Areas: Writer, Penciller, Inker, Letterer, Colourist
- Notable works: Beast; From Under Mountains

Marian Churchland (born June 15, 1982) is a Canadian comic book artist and graduate of the University of British Columbia. They first came to prominence in 2009 with their debut graphic novel Beast for Image.

== Career ==
Churchland began their comics career with short stories in the anthologies Meathaus S.O.S. and Dark Horse Presents, with the latter featuring Conan the Barbarian. Primarily a fan of video games, they were inspired to begin working as a comic artist by the work of Japanese game designers Yoshitaka Amano and Akihiko Yoshida. Their work is also influenced by painters including Delacroix, Van Gogh, and other members of the Renaissance. Churchland broke through with a three-issue arc as an artist on Richard Starkings' long-running creator-owned series Elephantmen. This brought them to the attention of established comic professionals such as Warren Ellis. They published Beast, their debut graphic novel as writer and artist, in 2009. It is a loose retelling of the Beauty and the Beast fairytale.

Following the success of Beast, in 2015, Churchland launched two projects as part of then-partner Brandon Graham's 8HOUSE shared universe. They were the artist on Arclight, the first story in the series, and co-writer of From Under Mountains alongside Claire Gibson, with art by Sloane Leong.

== Awards ==
- 2010: Won Russ Manning Promising Newcomer Award for Beast

== Bibliography ==
Interior comic work includes:

- Meathaus S.O.S.: "Untitled" (script and art, anthology graphic novel, Nerdcore, 2008)
- MySpace Dark Horse Presents #11: "Trophy" (with Timothy Truman, anthology, Dark Horse, 2008)
- Elephantmen (with Richard Starkings, Image):
  - "Dangerous Liaisons, Parts 3-5" (in #18-20, 2009)
  - "Questionable Things, Part 3" (among other artists, in #26, 2010)
  - "Agathe" (co-writer, art by Marley Zarcone, in #57, 2014)
- Beast (script and art, graphic novel, Image, 2009)
- Madame Xanadu #28: "Extra-Sensory, Chapter Five" (with Matt Wagner, Vertigo, 2010)
- Northlanders #41: "Thor's Daughter" (with Brian Wood, Vertigo, 2011)
- 8HOUSE #1-2: "Arclight" (with Brandon Graham, Image, 2015)
  - Arclight #3-4 (with Brandon Graham, Image, 2016)
- From Under Mountains #1-6 (co-writer with Claire Gibson, art by Sloane Leong, Image, 2015–2016)
- Mine!: A Celebration of Liberty and Freedom for All Benefiting Planned Parenthood: "We Cannot Make Our Sun Stand Still" (with Aria Baci, anthology graphic novel, ComicMix, 2017)

=== Covers only ===
- Elephantmen War Toys: Yvette #1 (Image, 2009)
- Tokyopop Presents: King City #3 (Image, 2009)
- Prophet #21 (Image, 2012)
- Island #12 (Image, 2016)
