= Nick Bertozzi =

American comic book writer and artist

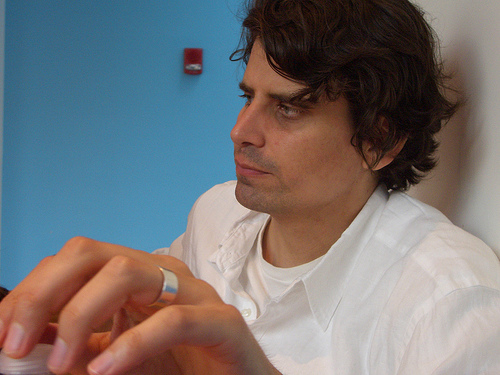
- Bertozzi at the Stata Center at MIT in 2006
- Born: Nicholas Urban Bertozzi; May 26, 1970 (age 56) Queens, New York, U.S.
- Areas: Cartoonist, Writer, Artist
- Pseudonym: NUB
- Notable works: The Salon; Rubber Necker; Lewis & Clark; Shackleton: Antarctic Odyssey; ACT-I-VATE founding member
- Awards: Xeric Grant, 2000; Ignatz Award, 2000; Emerging Talent of the Year (The Comics Journal), 2002; Harvey Award, 2003

Nick Bertozzi (born May 26, 1970) is an American comic book writer and artist, as well as a commercial illustrator and teacher of cartooning. His series Rubber Necker from Alternative Comics won the 2003 Harvey Awards for best new talent and best new series. He has published more than a dozen graphic novels, with about half of them collaborations and the rest written and drawn by Bertozzi.

== Early life and education ==
Nick Bertozzi was born in a naval hospital in Queens. He grew up on the East Side of Providence, Rhode Island, and in Rehoboth, Massachusetts, and got his B.A., in Spanish Literature, from the University of Massachusetts Amherst.

Bertozzi's artistic influences include Hergé's Tintin, Classics Illustrated, Jack Kirby's Kamandi, Garry Trudeau's Doonesbury, and Daniel Clowes' Eightball; as well as films like Werner Herzog's Aguirre, the Wrath of God, Stanley Kubrick's 2001: A Space Odyssey, and Akira Kurosawa's Seven Samurai.

He has lived in Madrid, Philadelphia (where he was a manager at Fat Jack's Comicrypt), and New York City.

== Career ==
Bertozzi's graphic novel, The Salon (published by St. Martin's Press in 2007), examines the creation of cubism in 1907 Paris in the context of a fictional murder mystery. The work was first serialized online in 2002 on serializer.net, a digital platform for original weekly comics.

A revised excerpt later appeared in Alternative Comics #2 (2004), which was distributed nationwide as part of Free Comic Book Day. Shortly afterward, a Georgia comics retailer was arrested after giving away Alternative Comics #2, in which the excerpt from The Salon depicted a nude Picasso, leading to charges of distributing obscene material to a minor. The case, supported by the Comic Book Legal Defense Fund, saw most charges eventually dropped or reduced, but it drew national attention as a significant free-expression controversy in the comics industry.

The complete, substantially reworked edition of The Salon — expanded by about 40 pages and streamlined in plot — was ultimately published in 2007 by St. Martin’s Griffin. John Hodgman, reviewing the book for The New York Times, wrote, "I’ve never understood Cubism as well as when Bertozzi's Braque and Picasso are first discussing it on a train, with Braque theorizing about simultaneous points of view and Picasso protesting that he was merely drawing the reflection in the train window."

Bertozzi illustrated Houdini: The Handcuff King (published by Hyperion in 2007), which was written by Jason Lutes. Bertozzi's art was praised for maintaining "a nice balance between showboating caricature and gritty realism."

Bertozzi also published two webcomics, Persimmon Cup and Pecan Sandy, as part of the ACT-I-VATE comics blog.

Bertozzi's first solo graphic novel after The Salon was Lewis & Clark (First Second, 2011). The graphic novel was widely praised for its engaging and informative portrayal of the historic expedition. The Forward commended the graphic novel as "a great piece of graphic nonfiction and one of the best examples of the genre available to readers today," highlighting Bertozzi's ability to capture the epic journey with wit and aplomb. Kirkus Reviews lauded the book's innovative approach, noting Bertozzi's masterful command in depicting the explorers' arduous trek through rough terrain and encounters with often unwelcoming natives. Publishers Weekly described it as "perfect for history buffs," emphasizing Bertozzi's skill in combining history lesson and character study through strong, gripping drawings Graphic Classroom also recommended it as a "wonderful accompaniment to any classroom unit on exploration and the West," underscoring its educational value.

Bertozzi wrote and laid out Becoming Andy Warhol (2016), a graphic biography illustrated by Pierce Hargan. Rather than covering Andy Warhol's entire life, the book focuses on his early struggles to move beyond illustration and achieve recognition as a serious artist, including his failed New York gallery efforts and his first solo show in Los Angeles featuring the Campbell's Soup Cans. Opening with a timeline of Warhol's major life events, the work presents a subjective but well-researched account, told with minimal narration and strong visual pacing. The book's use of a purple spot color was praised for its resonance with the story's tone, and reviewers such as Vice highlighted the book as a standout example of the biographical comics form.

In 2014, Bertozzi published Shackleton: Antarctic Odyssey, a graphic novel that recounts Ernest Shackleton's failed but celebrated expedition to the South Pole. While the crew ultimately survived, the sled dogs did not, underscoring the harsh realities of Antarctic exploration. The book emphasizes Shackleton's leadership, portraying his devotion to his men as both a weakness and a strength, and presents the journey with brisk pacing reminiscent of mid-20th-century youth history books,(particularly the Landmark Books series). The work was praised for Bertozzi’s inventive panel layouts, economical storytelling, and stark visual style, which together capture both the brutal environment and the expedition’s collective resilience.

His illustration clients include Nickelodeon Magazine, Spin, The New York Times, New York Press, Gourmet, Backstage, Abercrombie & Fitch, and WFMU.

He teaches cartooning at the School of Visual Arts in Manhattan.

== Awards ==
- 2000 Xeric Grant for Boswash (2000)
- 2000 Ignatz Award for Promising New Talent
- 2002:
  - Emerging Talent of the Year, The Comics Journal
  - (nomination) Eisner Award for Talent Deserving of Wider Recognition for The Masochists
- 2003:
  - Harvey Award for Best New Series (Rubber Necker)
  - Harvey Award for Best New Talent
  - Ignatz Award for Outstanding Comic, for Rubber Necker #2
  - (nomination) Ignatz Award for Outstanding Online Comic, for The Salon
- 2004:
  - (nomination) Ignatz Award for Outstanding Story, for "The Little Things", Rubber Necker #3
  - (nomination) Ignatz Award for Outstanding Series, for Rubber Necker
- 2007: (nomination) Ignatz Award for Outstanding Online Comic, for Persimmon Cup
- 2010: (nomination) Eisner Award for Best Short Story, for "How and Why to Bale Hay" in Syncopated (Villard Books)

== Selected bibliography ==
=== Solo projects ===
- Boswash (self-published, 2000) — published through a grant from the Xeric Foundation
- The Masochists (Alternative Comics, 2001) ISBN 978-1-891867-03-3
- Rubber Necker 1-4 (Alternative Comics, 2002–2004); 5-6 (self-published, 2013-2015)
- The Salon (St. Martin's Press, 2007) ISBN 978-0-312-35485-5
- Lewis & Clark (First Second, 2011) ISBN 978-1-5964-3450-9
- Persimmon Cup (self-published, 2014)
- Shackleton: Antarctic Odyssey (First Second, 2014) ISBN 9781596434516
- The Good Earth (Simon & Schuster, 2017), by Pearl S. Buck, adapted by Bertozzi ISBN 9781501132766
- Moose Otter (2 issues, self-published 2024–2025)
- Karmopolis: The Land of Cars (Top Shelf Productions, 2025) ISBN 978-1603095549

=== Collaborations ===
- Jason Lutes (w), Nick Bertozzi (a). Houdini: The Handcuff King (2007). Hyperion. ISBN 978-0-7868-3902-5
- Glenn Eichler (w), Nick Bertozzi (a). Stuffed! (2009). First Second. ISBN 978-1-59643-308-3
- Boaz Yakin (w), Nick Bertozzi (a). Jerusalem: A Family Portrait (2013). First Second. ISBN 9781596435759
- Kim Chaloner (w), Nick Bertozzi (a). Diabetes and Me (2013). Hill & Wang. ISBN 9780809038718
- Nick Bertozzi (w), Pierce Hargan (a). Becoming Andy Warhol (2016). Abrams ComicsArts. ISBN 1-4197-1875-4
- Ned Vizzini and David Levithan (w), Nick Bertozzi (a). Be More Chill: The Graphic Novel (2021). Disney-Hyperion. ISBN 978-1368061162
- Steve Sheinkin (w), Nick Bertozzi (a). Bomb (2023). Roaring Brook Press. ISBN 9781250206749

=== Anthologies ===
- Comix 2000 (L'Association, 2000)
- ACT-I-VATE Primer (IDW, 2009) ISBN 978-1-60010-528-9
- Syncopated: An Anthology of Nonfiction Picto-Essays (Villard Books, 2009) ISBN 978-0345505293
