= Ulises Fariñas =

Cuban-American comic book writer

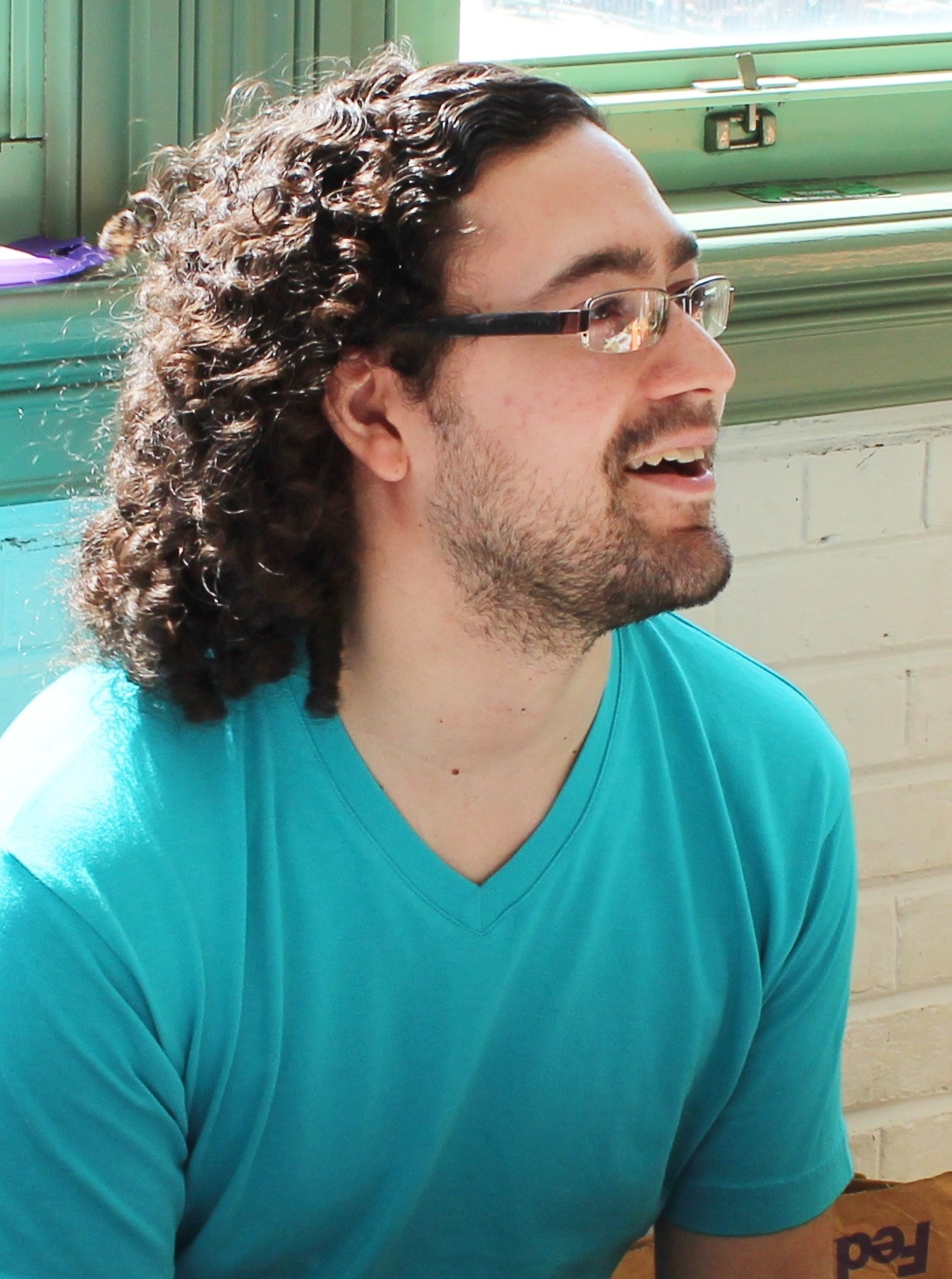
- Fariñas at the Asbury Park Comicon in 2013
- Born: December 29, 1985 (age 40) Elizabeth, New Jersey, U.S.
- Areas: Writer, Artist
- Notable works: Judge Dredd: Mega-City Two; Judge Dredd: Mega-City Zero; Motro; Gamma

Ulises Alfonso Fariñas (born December 29, 1985, in Elizabeth, New Jersey) is a Cuban-American comic book writer and artist.

== Education ==
While attending New York's School of Visual Arts, Fariñas studied under Nick Bertozzi, who invited him to join the web comics collective Act-i-vate.

== Career ==
Ulises Fariñas is the co-creator (along with writer Erick Freitas) of GAMMA, Motro, and Amazing Forest. He has worked as an artist on Catalyst Comix, and Transformers: Heart of Darkness.

IDW Comics hired Fariñas for art duties on Judge Dredd: Mega-City Two in 2014. He followed up that series in 2016 with Judge Dredd: Mega-City Zero, which he wrote.

In 2016, Fariñas and Storme Smith launched Buño, a publishing imprint at Magnetic Press. With Buño, Fariñas aims to provide an outlet which promotes creative freedom in storytelling and diversity of storytellers.

== Personal life ==
Fariñas lives and works in Schenectady, New York.

== Bibliography ==
=== Buño, Magnetic Press ===
- Cloudia & Rex (writer, with Erick Freitas (co-writer), art by Daniel Irizarri, limited series, forthcoming: July 11, 2017)
- Guardian Force Design Manual (writer and artist, inked by Mike Prezzato, one-shot, forthcoming)

=== Dark Horse Comics ===
- Catalyst Comix (artist, with Joe Casey (writer), limited series, July 3, 2013-March 5, 2014)
- GAMMA (writer, with Erick Freitas (co-writer), one-shot, July 24, 2013)

=== IDW Comics ===
- Godzilla in Hell #3 (writer, with Erick Freitas (co-writer), art by Buster Moody, limited series, September 30, 2015)
- Godzilla: Rage Across Time #4 (writer, with Erick Freitas (co-writer), art by Pablo Tunica, limited series, November 16, 2016)
- Judge Dredd: Mega-City Two (artist, with colors by Ryan Hill, written by Douglas Wolk, limited series, 2014)
- Judge Dredd: Mega-City Zero (writer, with Erick Freitas (co-writer), art by Dan McDaid, limited series, 2015-2016)
- Transformers: Heart of Darkness (artist, with writers Dan Abnett and Andy Lanning, 4-issue limited series, March 23, 2011-June 29, 2011)

=== Marvel Comics ===
- Captain America & the Mighty Avengers #1 (variant cover artist, with writer Al Ewing, art by Luke Ross, November 12, 2014)

=== Oni Press ===
- Motro (writer and artist, with co-writer Erick Freitas, ongoing series, November 2016-present)
