= Douglas Wolk =

American author and critic

- Wolk at the 2026 Rose City Comic Con

Douglas Wolk (/woʊlk/; born 1970) is a Portland, Oregon-based author and critic. He has written about comics and popular music for publications including The New York Times, Rolling Stone, The Washington Post, The Nation, The New Republic, Salon.com, Pitchfork Media, Vanity Fair, and The Believer. Wolk was the managing editor of CMJ New Music Monthly from 1993 to 1997, and hosted a radio show on WFMU from 1999 to 2001. He has four published books.

The most recent, All of the Marvels, tours the Marvel comics universe via his project of reading all 27,000 Marvel superhero comics. In support of that project, in January 2019 he launched a members-only reading group, wherein participants collectively read and discuss a single issue of a Marvel comic book every day. He frequently appears discussing comics on the YouTube channel of Portland comic book store, Books with Pictures.

== Early life ==
Wolk grew up in East Lansing, Michigan.

== Personal life ==
He married Lisa Gidley in 2001. They have one child.

== Published works ==
- James Brown's Live at the Apollo (a volume in the 33 1/3 series) (2004, Continuum Books)
- Reading Comics: How Graphic Novels Work and What They Mean (2007, Da Capo Press)
- Judge Dredd: Mega City Two: City of Courts, with Ulises Fariñas. (2014, IDW)
- All of the Marvels: A Journey to the Ends of the Biggest Story Ever Told (2021)

== Honors, decorations, awards and distinctions ==
- 2002-2003 Mid-Career Fellow, National Arts Journalism Program at Columbia University
- 2008 Eisner Award, Best Comics-Related Book
- 2008 Harvey Award for Best Biographical, Historical, or Journalistic Presentation
- 2010-2011 Fellow with the USC Annenberg/Getty Arts Journalism Program
