= The Amazing Joy Buzzards =

Comic book series

Volume 1 paperback cover

The Amazing Joy Buzzards is a comic book series created by Mark Andrew Smith and Dan Hipp.

== Publishing History ==
The Amazing Joy Buzzards was first published in January 2005 by Image Comics. It ran as two limited series, and the issues from both series were collected in two trade paperback volumes.

June 2008 saw a "Director's Edition" reprint of the first two series of Amazing Joy Buzzards in a digest size trade paperback. The "Director's Edition" was translated in September 2009 into Italian by Renior Comics.

The second volume to follow the Director's edition titled "Monster Love" was expected in 2008, but as of November 2021 has not been released. There are three digest sized volumes planned with the final in the series titled "Strohm's Pit".

== Plot ==
The Amazing Joy Buzzards are a rock 'n' roll adventure band that battles evil in all forms. The group consists of Biff Ashby, Gabe Carlyle, and Stevo Vargas. Unbeknownst to the band, The Amazing Joy Buzzards are managed by Dalton Warner of the Creative International Artists Agency, which is really the Central Intelligence Agency. Mr. Warner uses the band's superstar status as a cover to get into places to which he normally would not have access. Dalton uses the band's knack for defeating supernatural evils to his advantage. The Amazing Joy Buzzards have the assistance of a Mexican Wrestling genie named El Campeon who assists people in their time of need. He can be summoned by a magic amulet and by shouting the words "Go El Campeon Go!".

== Characters ==
=== Heroes ===
Biff Ashby

Stevo Vargas Gabe Carlyle

El Campeon

The Amazing Joy Buzzards first came across El Campeon during their adventures in Costa Rica in the story titled "The Devil's Zapatos" where he teams up with the drummer of the band Gabe Carlyle.

El Campeon's origin story was told in the single issue book "The Night of a Thousand Luchadores" which was printed in the Amazing Joy Buzzards Vol. 2 #5 and drawn by comic book artist Doug Holgate.

Over time there have been a few incarnations of El Campeon and the current one is estimated to be the fourth. Little is known about El Campeon's larger purpose. He is known to help people in their time of need. He is sometimes known to take the form of a Fox. Over the years his costume has also seen more than a few changes. He is afraid of midgets. El Campeon is brutal in battle, but easily distracted by edibles. El Campeon loves cereal, churros and donuts, and has been known to sleep for entire weeks at a time. El Campeon is summoned by the Amazing Joy Buzzards with the use of a magical amulet but as is evidenced in "The Amazing Joy Buzzards and the Christmas Troll" when Santa Claus uses a similar amulet we discover that there is actually more than one magical amulet that are capable of summoning him with the magic words.

El Campeon's sworn enemy in the Amazing Joy Buzzards series is named El Chupa who is a new addition to the Spider Syndicate and the leader of the Chupacabras controlling the monsters in the South and Central American Territories.

Professor Yu

Betty Yu

Dalton Warner

Murphy

=== Villains ===
The Puppeteer

Donovan the Devil Mummy Hipster

The Pink Bot

Madam Ivep

Galesh

Hypno

Killer Vampire Robots!

Joe Stereo

El Chupa

El Chicos Meurtes & El Chavo

Black Peter & Yanni The Christmas Troll

Anton Loveless
