= Cinema Sewer =

Canadian movie magazine

Cinema Sewer was a movie magazine published by Robin Bougie of Vancouver, British Columbia, Canada. It was published either biannually or annually between 1997 and 2021. The publication began in a traditional fanzine format (folded 8.5”x11” photocopies) before transitioning to a professionally published comic-book-sized format with issue 11. It used graphic pornographic comics, illustrations, and writing to focus on and review classic films in the exploitation, blaxploitation, sexploitation, horror, and porn genres. It also covered obscure underground creations such as video mixtapes and employee training videos. In October 2007, UK publisher FAB Press published a book collecting the best of the first 12 issues, which has since gone into three reprinted editions. In 2008, a second book (volume 2) was published by FAB Press, with subsequent books appearing in 2011 (volume 3), 2013 (volume 4), 2015 (volume 5), 2017 (volume 6), 2020 (volume 7) and a final collection in 2022 (volume 8).
