= Robin Ha =

Graphic novelist

- Education: Rhode Island School of Design
- Writing career
- Years active: 2016-present
- Genre: graphic novels
- Notable works: Cook Korean! Almost American Girl
- Website: robinha81.wixsite.com/robinha/about

Robin Ha is an illustrator, writer, and graphic novelist.

== Life and career ==
=== Early life ===
Ha was born in Seoul, Korea and is Korean by nationality. She went by the name "Ha Chuna" and was raised by her single mother, Cassie. At the age of 14, her mother brought her on a 'summer trip' to the United States, which became a permanent relocation to Huntsville, Alabama after her mother abruptly announced marriage to a suitor living there. While in the United States, she maintained her interest in Korean manhwa comic books, a hobby she picked up from her mother. Ha would graduate from the Rhode Island School of Design, and relocate to Brooklyn, where she began trying her hand in home cooking Korean cuisine.

=== Cook Korean! ===
Ha was working as a textile designer when she contributed a single page for a comic anthology illustrating a recipe for a Korean dish. In 2014, she began illustrating recipes for Korean dishes and posting a web comic series titled "Banchan in Two Pages”. After the popularity of the series grew, Ten Speed Press approached Ha about publishing an illustrated cookbook. As she had not undergone formal culinary training and was a relatively inexperienced cook, she cooked with her mother for the first time to develop the recipes featured.

In 2016, Ha released "Cook Korean!: A Comic Book with Recipes", which contained both narrative-driven comics as well as her illustrations of recipes and explanations of Korean ingredients and culinary practices. It debuted on the New York Times Bestselling List. Ha's choice of integrating Korean characters into the mostly English text, rather than transliterating or translating them, was highlighted as a part of a trend of non-English characters appearing in otherwise English-language cookbooks.

=== Almost American Girl ===
In 2013, Ha began working a memoir focusing of her own immigration. On January 28 of 2020, Ha released Almost American Girl, which she both wrote and illustrated. The graphic novel recalls Ha's experience with immigrating from South Korea to the United States as a teenager, including the tribulations with racist harassment, tension with Asian American relatives, and acclimating to foreign school and lifestyles. One review described its as "an insightful, moving coming-of-age tale," while another noted the work as "also a love letter to comics fans." It would be honored with a 2021 Walter Award under the "Books, Teen" category.
