= American Journal of Business =

- Discipline: Business
- Language: English

Publication details
- Former name(s): Mid-American Journal of Business
- History: 1986–present
- Publisher: Emerald Group Publishing
- Frequency: Biannually

Standard abbreviations
- ISO 4: Am. J. Bus.

Indexing
- ISSN: 1935-5181 (print); 1935-519X (web)
- LCCN: 2007215865
- OCLC no.: 78615285

Links
- Journal homepage; Online access

The American Journal of Business is a biannual peer-reviewed academic journal of business studies that is published by Emerald Group Publishing. It covers research in accountancy, finance, information systems, management, marketing, operations management, and strategic management. The journal was established in 1985 as the Mid-American Journal of Business, as the original member universities were in the Mid-American Conference. In 2007, it obtained its current name. It is currently sponsored by 10 universities accredited by the Association to Advance Collegiate Schools of Business, including Ball State University, Bowling Green State University, Central Michigan University, Cleveland State University, Miami University, Northern Illinois University, Ohio University, the University of Toledo, the University of Akron, and Western Michigan University. Each university provides a board member. The editors-in-chief are Richard Reed and Susan F. Storrud-Barnes (Cleveland State University). Occasionally, the journal publishes special issues dedicated to a single topic.

== Abstracting and indexing ==
The journal is abstracted and indexed in:

- Business and Economic Research Directory
- EBSCO databases
- LexisNexis
- Research Papers in Economics
