= Michel Fiffe =

American artist

- Born: Havana, Cuba
- Areas: Writer, Artist, Letterer, Colourist
- Notable works: Zegas; COPRA; All-New Ultimates

Michel Fiffe (/ˈfiːfeɪ/;) is a Cuban–American comic book artist and writer. He is best known for his self-published series COPRA and the Ultimate Marvel series All-New Ultimates.

== Early life ==
Michel Fiffe was born in Havana, Cuba.

== Career ==
Fiffe gained wide exposure in 2013 thanks to COPRA, a monthly series he created and self-published from November 2012. Despite its small print runs, COPRA has garnered acclaim from sites such as Comic Book Resources and ComicsAlliance. As the issues continued to sell out, compendiums reprinting three issues of COPRA at a time were released by Bergen Street Comics.

In 2014, Fiffe began writing All-New Ultimates for Marvel. In April, the first issue of All-New Ultimates was released, and COPRA returned with issue No. 13.

Fiffe's other work includes editing backup features in Erik Larsen's Savage Dragon, and launching his COPRA Press imprint with the debut of ZEGAS.

== Bibliography ==
Fiffe's comics work includes:

- "The Date" (art and script, in Savage Dragon No. 160, Image Comics, May 2010)
- Zegas #0–2 (art and script, Copra Press, 2011–2013)
- COPRA #1– (art and script, ongoing series, COPRA Press, November 2012 – present)
- All-New Ultimates #1–12 (writer, with artist Amilcar Pinna (#1–6, 10–12) and Giannis Milonogiannis (#7–9), Marvel Comics, June 2014 – March 2015)
- "Untitled" (art, with writer Joe Casey, in Captain Victory and the Galactic Rangers #2 & #6, Dynamite Entertainment, 2014–2015)
- "Guilty Pleasure" (art and script in Secret Wars: Secret Love #1, Marvel Comics, October 2015)
- "Hellcloud Awaits" (writer, with artist Benjamin Marra, in Bloodshot Reborn Annual #1, Valiant Comics, March 2016)
- "Bloodstrike" #0, #23–24 (art and script, Image Comics, May–July 2018)
- "Kilg%re [sic] City" in Superman Red & Blue #3, July 2021
