= Mark Andrew Smith =

American comic book author and graphic novelist

- Born: 1979 (age 46–47)
- Area: Author
- Notable works: Gladstone's School for World Conquerors; Popgun; The New Brighton Archeological Society
- Awards: 2008 Harvey Award for Best Anthology; 2010 Eisner Award for Best Anthology; 2013 American Library Association Best Graphic Novel for Teens

Mark Andrew Smith (born July 24, 1979) is an American comic book author and graphic novelist.

== Early life and education ==
Smith attended the University of California, Santa Barbara, where he studied film. He graduated in 2002. Smith received his Master's Degree in TESOL from SIT Graduate Institute in Brattleboro Vermont in 2017.

== Career ==
Out of college, Smith's first job was as a production assistant on season one of American Idol. His first entry into the comic book world came in 2004 when Smith and Dan Hipp were picked up by Image Comics. Image Comics would go on to publish their work, The Amazing Joy Buzzards. Smith is also the co-creator and editor of the Popgun Comics anthology.

Smith wrote the original graphic novel Aqua Leung, published in April 2008. Aqua Leung was nominated for a Yalsa award for best graphic novel for teens. Also in 2008 Smith wrote Kill All Parents, a 38-page one-shot about superheroes whose parents are killed by a secret government program, drawn by Marcelo Di Chiara, also for Image Comics.

In 2009 Smith released The New Brighton Archeological Society stemming from a series of short stories in Popgun with artist Matthew Weldon. The New Brighton Archeological Society follows a group of children whose parents are the greatest archeologists in the world. When their parents are lost on an expedition, the children must finish their parents' work, collect the books of magic, and defeat their parents' nemesis. The New Brighton Archeological Society was selected as "Best All-Ages Comic" of 2009 by MTV Splash Page. The New Brighton Archeological Society received two Harvey Award Nominations in 2010.

Smith has been published in multiple anthologies such as the Belle & Sebastian Anthology, 24Seven Vol. 1, Space Doubles, Paper Museum Vol. 3, and Popgun.

2011 saw the release of Smith's Gladstone's School for World Conquerors by Image Comics with artist and co-creator Armand Villavert, which centers on a super-villain academy. Gladstone's School for World Conquerors won the 2013 American Library Association Award for 'Great Graphic Novels for Teens'.

Smith released Sullivan's Sluggers, a baseball horror graphic novel drawn by James Stokoe, in 2012. Sullivan's Sluggers was published by Dark Horse Comics in 2018. Sullivan's Sluggers was published in Italian by SaldaPress in 2022.

In 2015, New Brighton Archeological Society Volume 1 was published as a hardcover by 'Maneki Neko Books' along with volume 2 titled 'The Sword of Azure', both drawn by Matthew Weldon.

In 2016, Gladstone's School for World Conquerors Volume 1 was published as a hardcover by 'Maneki Neko Books' along with Gladstone's School for World Conquerors Volume 2, which is drawn by frequent collaborator Matthew Weldon, who was filling in for co-creator Armand Villavert on art duties.

In 2019, Smith released Gladstone's School for World Conquerors Book 3 with artist and co-creator Armand Villavert.

2019 also saw the release of a Kid Nefarious one-shot illustrated by Matthew Weldon and written by Ryan Schrodt, with Smith editing.

In 2020, Smith edited the Gladstone's School for World Conquerors double features, which included 'The Skull Brothers & Martian Jones' and 'Mummy Girl & Ghost Girl'. The double features are 72-page flipbooks. 'The Skull Brothers' was written by Erik Martinez and illustrated by Marcelo DiChiara.'Martian Jones' was written by Erick Taggart and illustrated by Armand Villavert.'Mummy Girl' was written by Justin Robinson and illustrated by Armand Villavert. 'Ghost Girl' was written by Erik Martinez and illustrated by Armand Villavert. Both of the double features were lettered by Patrick Brosseau.

2023 saw the release of 'Gladstone's School for World Conquerors: Gladstone's Revenge'. 'Gladstone's Revenge' was written by David Michelinie and illustrated by Armand Villavert. It was colored by Hackto Oshiro and lettered by Patrick Brosseau.

== Awards and honors ==
Smith has received recognition for his work on Popgun. Volume 1 won the 2008 Harvey Award for Best Anthology. This was followed by Volume 3 winning the 2010 Eisner Award for Best Anthology. Gladstone's School for World Conquerors won the 2013 ALA Awards for 'Great Graphic Novels for Teens'.

== Bibliography ==
Comics writing work includes:

- Gladstone's School for World Conquerors Book One (with Armand Villavert, Image Comics, 2011)
- Gladstone's School for World Conquerors Book 1: 'Supervillainy 101' , Hardcover (with Armand Villavert, Maneki Neko Books, 2016)
- Gladstone's School for World Conquerors Book 2: 'In the Shadow of Shiran' , Hardcover (with Matthew Weldon, Maneki Neko Books, 2016)
- Gladstone's School for World Conquerors Book 3: 'Scorpio Kane' , Hardcover (with Armand Villavert, Maneki Neko Books, 2019)
- The Amazing Joy Buzzards Volume One "Here Come the Spiders" (with Dan Hipp, Image Comics, 2006)
- The Amazing Joy Buzzards Volume Two "Monster Love" (with Dan Hipp, Image Comics, 2009)
- The New Brighton Archeological Society (with Matthew Weldon, Image Comics, 2009)
- The New Brighton Archeological Society Book 1: 'The Castle of Galomar' Hardcover (with Matthew Weldon, by Maneki Neko Books, 2015)
- The New Brighton Archeological Society Book 2: 'The Sword of Azure' Hardcover (with Matthew Weldon, by Maneki Neko Books, 2015)
- Sullivan's Sluggers (with James Stokoe, Maneki Neko Books, 2012)
- Sullivan's Sluggers (with James Stokoe, Dark Horse Comics, 2018)
- Sullivan's Sluggers (with James Stokoe, SaldaPress, 2022)
- Aqua Leung (with Paul Maybury, graphic novel, 208 pages, Image Comics, April 2008)
- Kill All Parents (with Marcelo Dichiara, one-shot, Image Comics, June 2008)
- Popgun: "The Amazing Joy Buzzards in the Fearless Vampire Hunters" (with Dan Hipp, Image Comics, 2007)
- Popgun: "The New Brighton Archeological Society: "Introduction", "The Bath", "Souls in a Jar" (with Matthew Weldon, Image Comics, 2007)
- Popgun: "Rex Onazuka: The Sons of Liberty" (with Johann Leroux, Image Comics, 2007)
- Popgun 3: "Rex Onazuka: The Godfather of Monsters" (with Johann Leroux, Image Comics, 2009)
- Popgun 4: "Bullets for the Poor" (with David Collinson, Image Comics, 2010)
- Low Orbit: "Little Medusa's Big Day Out" (with Kevin Dalton, Image Comics, 2006)
- Low Orbit: "Bastion's 7" (with Sean Galloway, Image Comics, 2006)
- Space Doubles: "Escape Pod" (with Matthew Hyun, 3rd World Studios, 2008)
- Image Comics Holiday Special 2005: "The Amazing Joy Buzzards and the Christmas Troll" (with Dan Hipp, Image Comics, 2005)
- Paper Museum Volume Three "The Devil in the Gears" (with Jim Pezzetti, Jungleboy Press, 2006)
- Zowie! Volume Two "The Grenade Jumper" (with Ed Reynolds, Zowie Comics, 2006)
- 24Seven: "Things Run Amuck" (with Paul Maybury, Image Comics, 2006)
- Popgun: "Aqua Leung, Ambush" (with Paul Maybury, Image Comics, 2007)
- Put the Book Back on the Shelf: A Belle & Sebastian Anthology: "Ninja No!" (with Paul Maybury, Image Comics, 2006)

=== Editor ===
- Gladstone's Revenge (Written by David Michelinie and Illustrated by Armand Villavert, Maneki Neko Books, April 2023)
- Gladstone's School for World Conquerors
  - The Skull Brothers (written by Erik Martinez and illustrated by Marcelo DiChiara, Maneki Neko Books, September 2020)
  - Martian Jones (written by Erick Taggart and illustrated by Armand Villavert, Maneki Neko Books, September 2020)
  - Ghost Girl (written by Erik Martinez and illustrated by Armand Villavert, Maneki Neko Books, September 2020)
  - Mummy Girl (written by Justin Robinson and illustrated by Armand Villavert, Maneki Neko Books, September 2020)
  - Kid Nefarious (written by Ryan Schrodt and illustrated by Matthew Weldon, Maneki Neko Books, September 2019)
- Popgun:
  - Volume One (with Joe Keatinge, Image Comics, November 2007)
  - Volume Two (with Joe Keatinge, Image Comics, July 2008)
  - Volume Three (with DJ Kirkbride, Image Comics, April 2009)
  - Volume Four (Executive Editor, Image Comics, February 2010)
