= ComicsAlliance =

Defunct website about comic books

- Website type: Comics news
- Available in: English
- Dissolved: July 2021
- Owner: Townsquare Media
- Editor: Andrew Wheeler
- Launched: 2007
- Current status: Inactive though archived

ComicsAlliance is an American website dedicated to covering the comic book industry as well as comic-related media, and is owned by Townsquare Media. It was nominated for multiple awards, winning an Eisner Award in 2015 for Best Comics Periodical/Journalism.

== History ==
ComicsAlliance was established in 2007 as part of an online network of sites owned by AOL, and run by editors-in-chief John Anderson and Chris Dooley. The site featured writing from critics including David Brothers, Andy Khouri, Caleb Goellner and Chris Sims. Laura Hudson became the editor-in-chief in 2009. In 2012 Hudson left the site, with former Vertigo Comics editor Joe Hughes later announced as the new editor-in-chief.

On April 26, 2013, ComicsAlliance and the AOL Music properties were abruptly shut down. On June 2, 2013, AOL sold ComicsAlliance and several of the AOL Music blogs to Townsquare Media, with editors Joe Hughes, Andy Khouri, and Caleb Goellner remaining in position on the site.

In 2015 the site was the recipient of an Eisner Award in the category Best Comics Periodical/Journalism.

In April 2017, ComicsAlliance was placed on hiatus by Townsquare Media and the most recent editorial staff was dissolved.

In July 2021, Comics Alliance had new content posted on its site and social media accounts but there was no new content published since then.

== Regular features ==
The longest-running column on the site is Ask Chris, written by Chris Sims, which has run on the site since 2010. In 2011, Sims was featured on The Daily Show as part of a feature on the Batman comics series, credited as a 'Batmanologist'. Additional features of note for the site have included Kate or Die, a regular comic from cartoonist Kate Leth; as well as Best Art Ever (This Week), a weekly feature showcasing new comics-related art. The podcasts War Rocket Ajax and The Arkham Sessions have both been serialised on the site.
