= Argentine comics =

Comics originating in Argentina

- Earliest publications: Late 19th century
- Publishers: Ediciones Frontera; Ediciones de la Urraca; Ediciones Record
- Publications: Patoruzú; Rico Tipo; El Eternauta; Nippur de Lagash; Fierro
- Creators: Adolfo Mazzone; Quino; Héctor Germán Oesterheld; Alberto Breccia; Roberto Fontanarrosa
- Series: "Patoruzú" "Mafalda" "Inodoro Pereyra" "Gaturro" "Cybersix"
- Languages: Spanish

Related articles

Argentine comics (Spanish: historietas or cómics) are one of the most important comic traditions internationally, and the most important within Latin America, living its "Golden Age" between the 1940s and the 1960s, extending into the 1980s. In 1970, the theorist Oscar Masotta synthesized its contributions in the development of their own models of action comics (Oesterheld, Hugo Pratt), humor comics (Divito, Quino) and folkloric comics (Walter Ciocca) and the presence of other artists (Hugo Pratt and Alberto Breccia).

== History ==
=== Early years ===
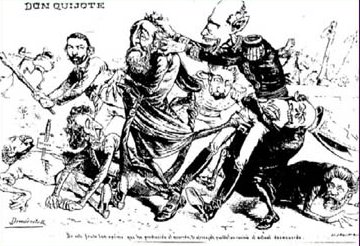
Front of Don Quijote magazine, circa 1890.

The first installment of Arturo Lanteri's Las aventuras del Negro Raúl (1916), the first comic strip by an Argentine-born author and the first in which the protagonist, setting, storylines, and stylistic approach were strictly local.

The first cartoons to appear in Argentina were editorial cartoons in political satire magazines at the end of the 19th century. These cartoons, originally single panels, quickly evolved to multiple panel constructions with sequential action. Many used methods such as text indicating dialogue emanating from the speaker's mouth, or text below the drawings for dialogue and explanation.

In the 1900s, comics continued to be largely political satire and commentary, but strips about normal life, called cuentos vivos (lively tales) began to appear. Text still frequently appeared below each drawing with dialogue or explanation. Comics continued to be published exclusively in magazines. Also during this time, translations of comics from the United States, such as Cocoliche (Happy Hooligan) by Frederick Burr Opper, showed up in Argentina.

During the 1910s, the amount of comics made in Argentina grew by leaps and bounds. In 1912, the first Argentine comic strip proper, with speech balloons and recurring characters, Las aventuras de Viruta y Chicharrón, by Manuel Redondo, began being published in Caras y Caretas. Later comics, such as Aventuras de un matrimonio aun sin bautizar (later known as Aventuras de Don Tallarín y Doña), followed, and by 1917, Las diabluras de Tijereta was one of the lone strips that still put text at the bottom of each picture. Billiken, a children's magazine started in 1919, already included some cartoons.

The popularity of comics grew in the 1920s, and children's comics gained popularity. The newspaper La Nación started publishing comics daily in 1920, and comics, both foreign and domestic, were a big reason for the popularity of the newspaper Crítica. In 1928, the first publication containing solely comics, the magazine El Tony, began its run of more than 70 years. The '20s also saw the first characters created (Andanzas y desventuras de Manolo Quaranta) and drawn (Panitruco) by Dante Quinterno. Also in 1928 Quinterno's most important character, Patoruzú, first appeared.

The 1930s saw most important newspapers featuring comic strips. Patoruzú had its own magazine, which began publication in November 1936. It became one of the most important humor magazines of the 1940s, with a record of over 300,000 copies printed for one edition. Also during the late 1930s superheroes from the United States, such as Superman and Batman, began appearing in local magazines such as Pif Paf (1939), giving a place to action comics.

=== Golden Age ===
Left: El Eternauta, an Argentine comics' classic, first appeared in the magazine Hora Cero, written by Oesterheld and drawn by Solano López.
Right: The Chicas de Divito (Girls of Divito) were any of the girls that appeared in the covers of Rico Tipo. Unwittingly, they marked the women's fashion at that time in Buenos Aires.

The Argentine comic had its golden age between the mid-1940s and the 1960s, the so-called Golden Age of Argentine Comics (la "Epoca de Oro" de la historieta argentina), when a number of foreign artists, including many Italians, arrived in Argentina following World War II.

José Antonio Guillermo Divito's magazine Rico Tipo, launched on 16 November 1944, contained many comic strips and was published until 1972. It included Adolfo Mazzone's classic Piantadino strip, Oscar Conti's Amarroto and many others. Intervalo magazine appeared in 1945, containing longer dialogs and text in comparison with comics edited in other houses. Patoruzito magazine also appeared in 1945, containing a number of children's comics in addition to the adventures of young Paturuzú. In 1948, local superhero Misterix got his own magazine, which also included other action comics, and which would become one of the most important the time period. Initially, it contained several Italian comics translated into Spanish, but later that gave way to local creations.

The late 1940s saw the arrival to Argentina of a circle of Italian writers and artists, which further improved the quantity and quality of the comics in Argentina. These included Mario Faustinelli, Hugo Pratt, Ivo Pavone, and Dino Battaglia, who were known as the Venice Group. Some Argentines, notably Alberto Breccia and Solano López, were considered honorary members of the Venice Group. A number of new publications appeared, such as D'Artagnan and Fantasía. During this decade, Héctor Oesterheld, one of the most prolific writers, and Solano López also created the Hora Cero magazine.

Between the mid-1950s and mid-1960s, some of the most important Argentine comics were created, such as Héctor Oesterheld's El Eternauta (1957); Héctor Oesterheld and Breccia's Mort Cinder (1962) in the action genre; Quino's Mafalda (1964) and Mordillo (1966) in the humor genre; and García Ferré's (1962) Anteojito y Antifaz for children. Another illustrator, Landrú, launched Tía Vicenta in 1957. Prominently featuring his own political cartoons and those of colleagues such as Oski, Caloi, and Hermenegildo Sábat, its circulation grew to nearly half a million and became the most widely read magazine in Argentina before its banning order by the military government installed in 1966.

Around 1960, of the 6 best selling publications, only one was foreign (Donald Duck magazine). Nevertheless, the arrival of foreign publications, mainly from Mexico, with better paper and ink quality and lower prices, started a financial crisis in the Argentine comic industry, and several publishers, including Oesterheld's Ediciones Frontera, had to close or be sold, which forced several artists and writers to go abroad.

=== Political instability ===
After the 1966 coup d'état, the comics industry suffered from both some censorship and from recurring economic downturns. The 1968 biographic graphic novel of Che Guevara by Oesterheld and Breccia was removed from circulation by the government and the originals destroyed. Nevertheless, action comic magazines such as El Tony and D'Artagnan continued to publish both foreign and local creations. In 1967 Robin Wood's Nippur de Lagash debuted in D'Artagnan, and in 1969 a sequel to the Eternauta was published.

Fontanarrosa's Inodoro Pereyra premiered in 1971 in Córdoba's Hortensia magazine, which became one of the few successful Argentine magazines from outside Buenos Aires. The satirical humor magazine Satyricón was launched in 1972, though tightening government censorship led to its closure in 1974. The same problem led Quino to put an end to Mafalda in 1973, after which he moved to Italy. Caloi created Clemente in 1973 as a secondary character in a comic strip centered on Bartolo the tram conductor; Clemente would however soon overshadow the conductor and became a fixture on the Clarín back page until his own death in 2012.

From their exile in Europe, Muñoz and Sampayo created Alack Sinner in 1974, which was later published in Argentine magazines such as Super Humor and Fierro. In 1975 Trillo and Altuna started one of the longest lived newspaper strips, El loco Chávez, published in Clarín.

In 1976 while working on a politicized sequel of the Eternauta that was being published in Skorpio, Oesterheld was kidnapped and disappeared by military government forces. A year later his four daughters, all leftist students, disappeared as well.

1978 saw the birth of satirical current events magazine Humo® by Andrés Cascioli and Ediciones de la Urraca. One of the first attempts of erotic comic was the 1979 Las puertitas del Sr. López by Altuna-Trillo, later published in Humor and Fierro (1984).

=== Renaissance ===
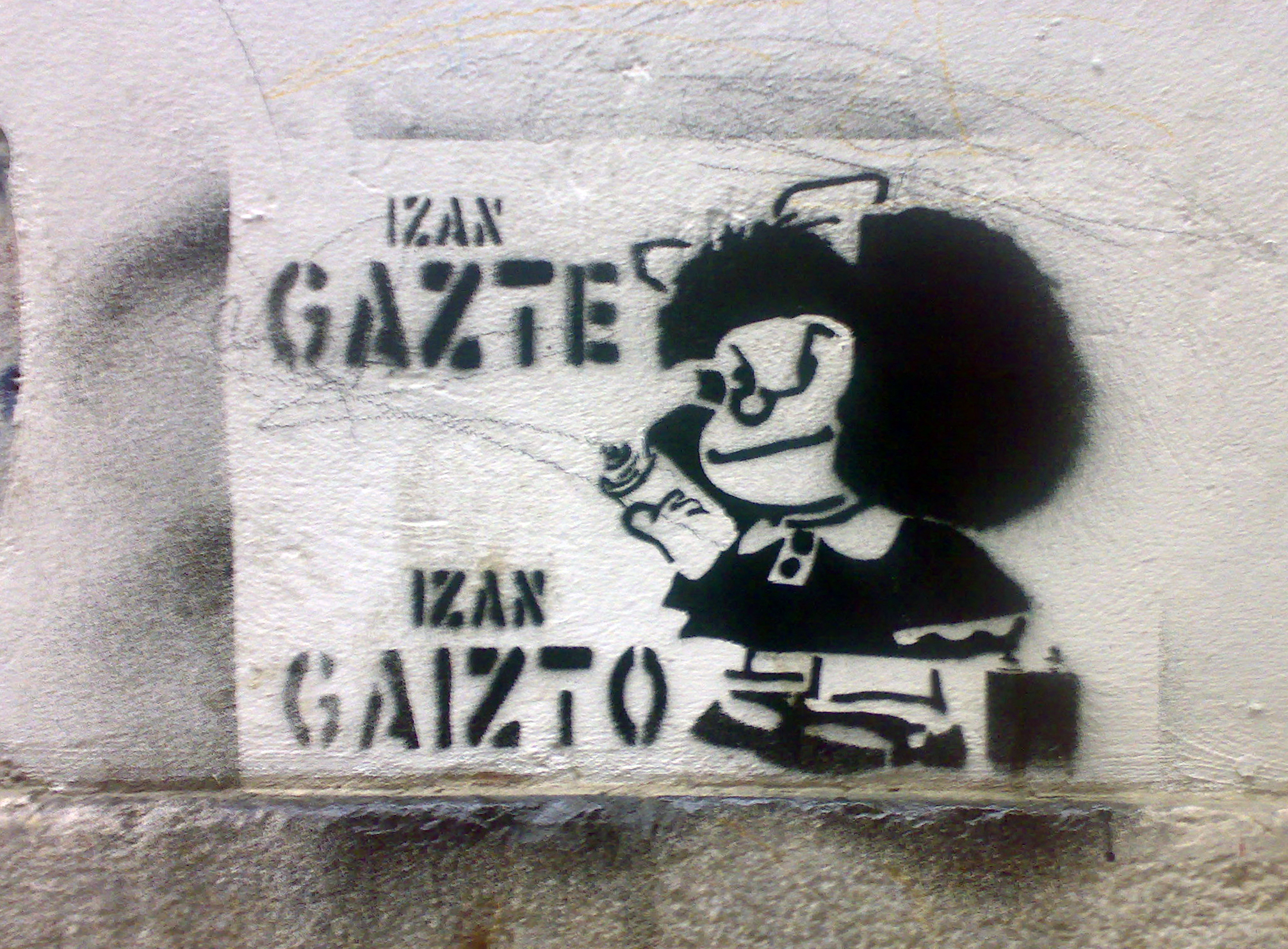
Mafalda, a comic strip from the 1970s, is still the most beloved comic character in Argentina and was popular throughout the Spanish speaking world and beyond (above, a graffitti in the Basque Country, Spain)

The return of democracy in late 1983 ended years of military censorship. A new cultural wave started in several arts. In 1978 still under the dictatorship the satirical magazine Hum® (short for Humor Registrado or "Trademark Humor") had been created, which would growingly feature artwork and comics by notable artists, running monthly until 1999. Applying the specialized anthology format in the tradition of magazines like the French Métal Hurlant and Pilote, Argentine creators began publishing Fierro; The magazine had a 100 issue run, from 1984 until 1991. In 2006, the newspaper publisher Página/12 initiated a second volume of the magazine.

=== The rise of self-publishing ===
Argentine creators started producing self-published zines in the 1980s. This trend intensified during the 1990s with magazines such as El Cazador or Ultra. Participants in this trend attribute the boom to both economic and cultural factors.

On the economic side, technological developments and national crisis facilitated the dissemination of new methods. Increased availability of personal computers enabled creators to format, edit and print their own work. Other factors that contributed to the boom resulted from a crisis in traditional methods of production and distribution. In the 1990s, pro-trade reforms made it more difficult for local products to compete. Suffering a similar fate to many sectors of the Argentine media and industry in general, the comic magazines still working during the 1980s slowly decreased in quality and died off (e.g. Fierro, D'Artagnan, Nippur). While many creators found work in other countries or changed professions, others continued to reach local audiences by publishing and distributing their own work. Another side-effect of the crisis was that many creators started offering workshops for children and teens because job markets were tight. Passing on their own methods, creators armed a new generation of creators with self-publishing techniques.

Cultural factors that creators cite as shaping the self-publishing boom include a desire to read and produce stories that deal with local issues by local authors, a strong sense of autonomy matched by a tradition of collaboration and a commitment to free creative expression.

Competing in a difficult market, Argentine creators have experimented with various formats and forms of collective self-help. At first, self-published works remained in dark corners of the comic shops and (less so) news stands and most of them failed to survive past the 2nd or 3rd issue (i.e. Ultra). To collectively address the challenges of independent publishing, creators formed the Asociación de Historietistas Independientes (Association of Independent Comic Creators, AHI), at the 1996 Fantabaires convention, from which later the group La Productora split. Costs are sometimes shared, as in the case of publishing house Ex Abrupto, which co-publishes Suda Mery K!, a biannual anthology, with Viñetas con Altura of Bolivia and Feroces Editores of Chile.

== Notable artists and writers ==
- Dante Quinterno
- Horacio Altuna
- Daniel Branca
- Alberto Breccia
- Carlos Loiseau (Caloi)
- Guillermo Divito
- Roberto Fontanarrosa
- Juan Giménez
- Juan Carlos Colombres
- Juan Zanotto
- Ricardo Siri Liniers
- Maitena
- Domingo Mandrafina
- Carlos Meglia
- Fernando Sendra
- José Antonio Muñoz
- Héctor Germán Oesterheld
- Ariel Olivetti
- Oscar Conti (Oski)
- Hugo Pratt
- Quino
- Carlos Sampayo
- Carlos Trillo
- Enrique Alcatena

== Notable comics ==
- Boogie, el aceitoso, by Fontanarrosa
- El Cazador de Aventuras, an adult humor comic
- Clemente, by Caloi, published in the newspaper Clarín
- Cybersix, by Carlos Meglia, also adapted into a live-action and animated television program
- El Eternauta, a science-fiction tale about an alien invasion, by Héctor Germán Oesterheld (script) and Francisco Solano López (drawings)
- Inodoro Pereyra, the Renegau, a gaucho, the most famous creation of Fontanarrosa
- El loco Chávez, by Carlos Trillo and Horacio Altuna
- Locuras de Isidoro, Isidoro Cañones, a playboy, by Dante Quinterno
- Macanudo, by Liniers, published in La Nación
- Mayor y Menor, by Chanti
- Mafalda, the most famous Argentine comic strip, by Quino
- Mort Cinder, by Oesterheld and Breccia
- Nippur de Lagash, by Robin Wood and Lucho Olivera
- Patoruzú, since 1928, is about a native Patagonian cacique with superhuman strength, by Dante Quinterno
- Patoruzito, since 1945, is about a little native Patagonian Indian with superhuman strength, By Dante Quinterno
- Yo, Matías, by Sendra, published in Clarín

== Conventions ==
- Leyendas, a defunct science fiction, fantasy, anime and comics convention held annually in Rosario.
- Fantabaires, a defunct annual comics convention held in Buenos Aires.
- Crack Bang Boom, a cosplay, science fiction, fantasy and comics convention held annually in Rosario.

== Sources ==
- Argentine comics (in English and Spanish)
- La Historia del Comic en Argentina (in Spanish)
- Historieteca (in Spanish)
