= Landrú =

Juan Carlos Colombres
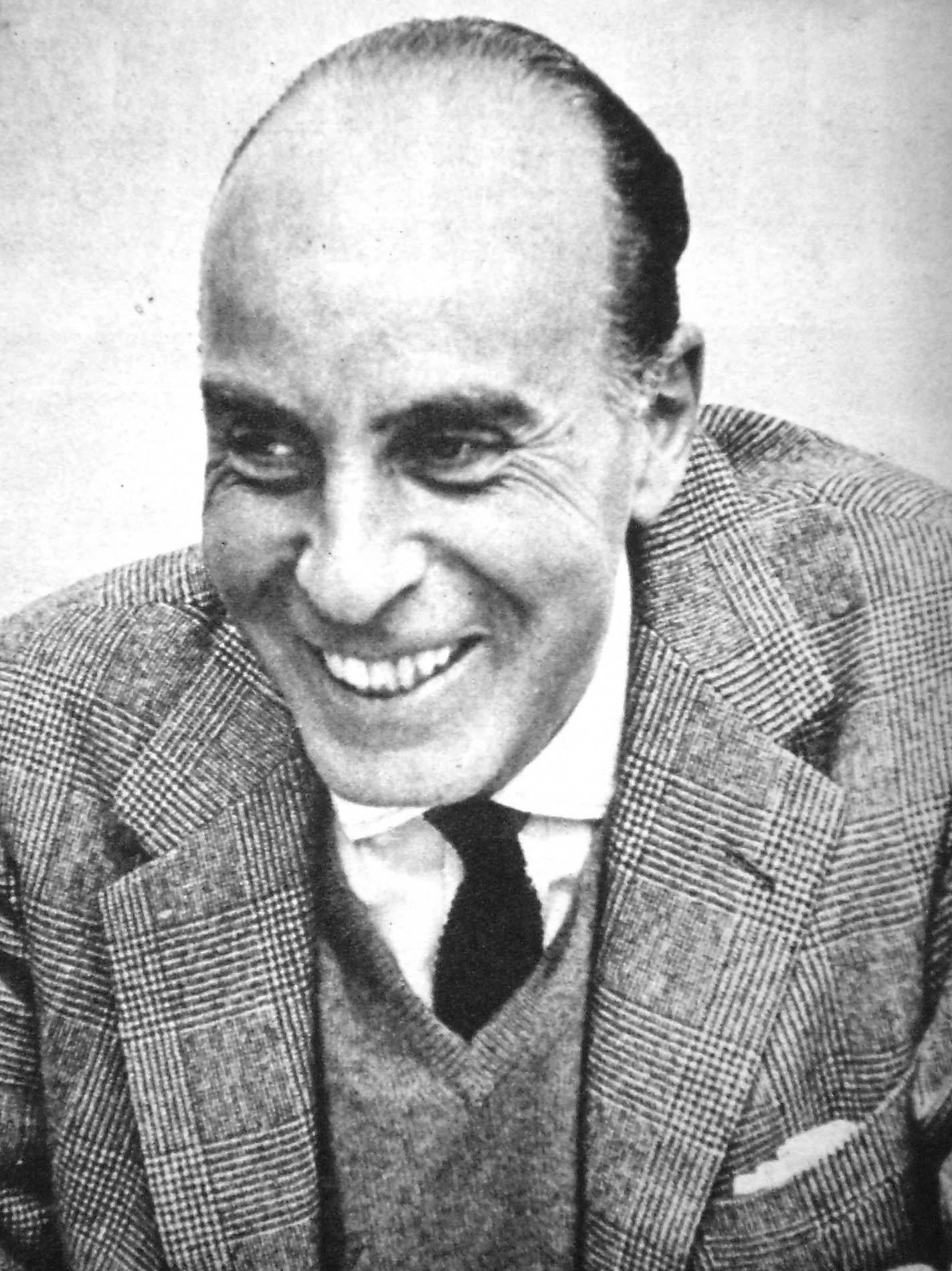
- Landrú in the 1960s
- Born: January 19, 1923; Buenos Aires
- Died: 6 July 2017 (aged 94); Buenos Aires
- Other name: Landrú
- Known for: Political satire
- Notable work: Tía Vicenta
- Style: Caricature
- Website: landru.org

Juan Carlos Colombres (January 19, 1923 – July 6, 2017) was an Argentine caricaturist and humorist whose work has illustrated articles and editorials in a number of the nation's leading periodicals. His contributions appear under the byline of Landrú.

== Biography ==
Colombres was born in Buenos Aires in 1923. His father's family were prominent in Tucumán Province, where in 1821 Bishop José Colombres introduced sugarcane. He took an early interest in both drawing and irony, and in 1939, created Génesis Novísimo, his illustrated alternative to the Book of Genesis. He began his career in journalism in 1945 as a commentator and editorial cartoonist for Don Fulgencio, directed at the time by Lino Palacio. He also became a frequent contributor to other comic books, including Dante Quinterno's regionalist Patoruzú and Guillermo Divito's Rico Tipo ("Rich Guy"). Colombres married the former Margarita Miche in 1946, and they had two children.

Colombres joined Jorge Palacio (Lino Palacio's son) in a recently established satirical magazine, Cascabel ("Rattle"), in 1947. Cascabel became known for its daring political humor during an era of growing press censorship in Argentina, and in particular for Colombres' parodies of high-powered figures in business and government. Perhaps the best-known were his depictions of President Juan Perón, who was portrayed in full military regalia and a large pear for a head. The pun, which played on the similarity between the name Perón and the Spanish word pera, prompted Jorge Palacio (who wrote under the pen name of Faruk) to urge Colombres to also adopt a pseudonym. Asked for suggestions by Colombres, Palacio remarked that the satirist, who at the time wore a goatee, resembled the French serial killer Henri Désiré Landru ("Bluebeard," or as he is known in Argentina: "Landrú").

Colombres earned a gold medal from the Argentine Illustrators' Association in 1948, and a Clarín Award in 1954. Extending his satirical reach beyond print, he also led Jacinto W. y sus Tururú Serenaders, a 1958 musical group created as a parody of the Doo-wop ensembles popular at the time.

His illustrations appeared in a large number of Argentine publications at the time, notably in El Gráfico and El Mundo. He established a satirical publication, Tía Vicenta, with fellow caricaturist Oski in 1957. The current events weekly quickly became a success, and by the early 1960s, enjoyed a circulation of nearly 500,000. His irreverent portrayals of General Juan Carlos Onganía (who had seized power in a 1966 coup d'état) resulted in the closure of Tía Vicenta by government edict in July of that year. The shuttered magazine returned in a less successful version as Tío Landrú from 1967 to 1969, and again by its original name, between 1977 and 1980.

Colombres was awarded the Maria Moors Cabot prize by Columbia University in 1971, and was inducted into the National Academy of Journalists (Argentina). He began what became his most enduring association when, in 1975, he contributed his first illustrations to Clarín, the leading news daily in Argentina. His illustrations not only lampooned prominent politicians and businessmen, but also regularly featured stock characters meant to satirize prevailing mores and ironies. Some of the best-known are the antiquated Aunts Vicenta and Cora; the self-righteous "pillar of society" Señor Porcel (whom he patterned after his own father); the unethical businessman Señor Cateura, Rogelio (whose good intentions are defeated by "analysis paralysis"); the anti-Peronist inquisitor Detective Cuculiu; Fofoli (who replaces even common words for euphemisms); the philandering executive; and his put-upon wife, the self-absorbed Señora Gorda.

He also wrote and illustrated a weekly column in Clarín's Ollas y Sartenes culinary insert. The column, Landrú a la pimienta ("peppered Landrú") offers recipes created from ingredients with a double meaning related to Argentina's current events.

He died at 94 years of age in Buenos Aires on 6 July 2017
