= Melle Weersma =

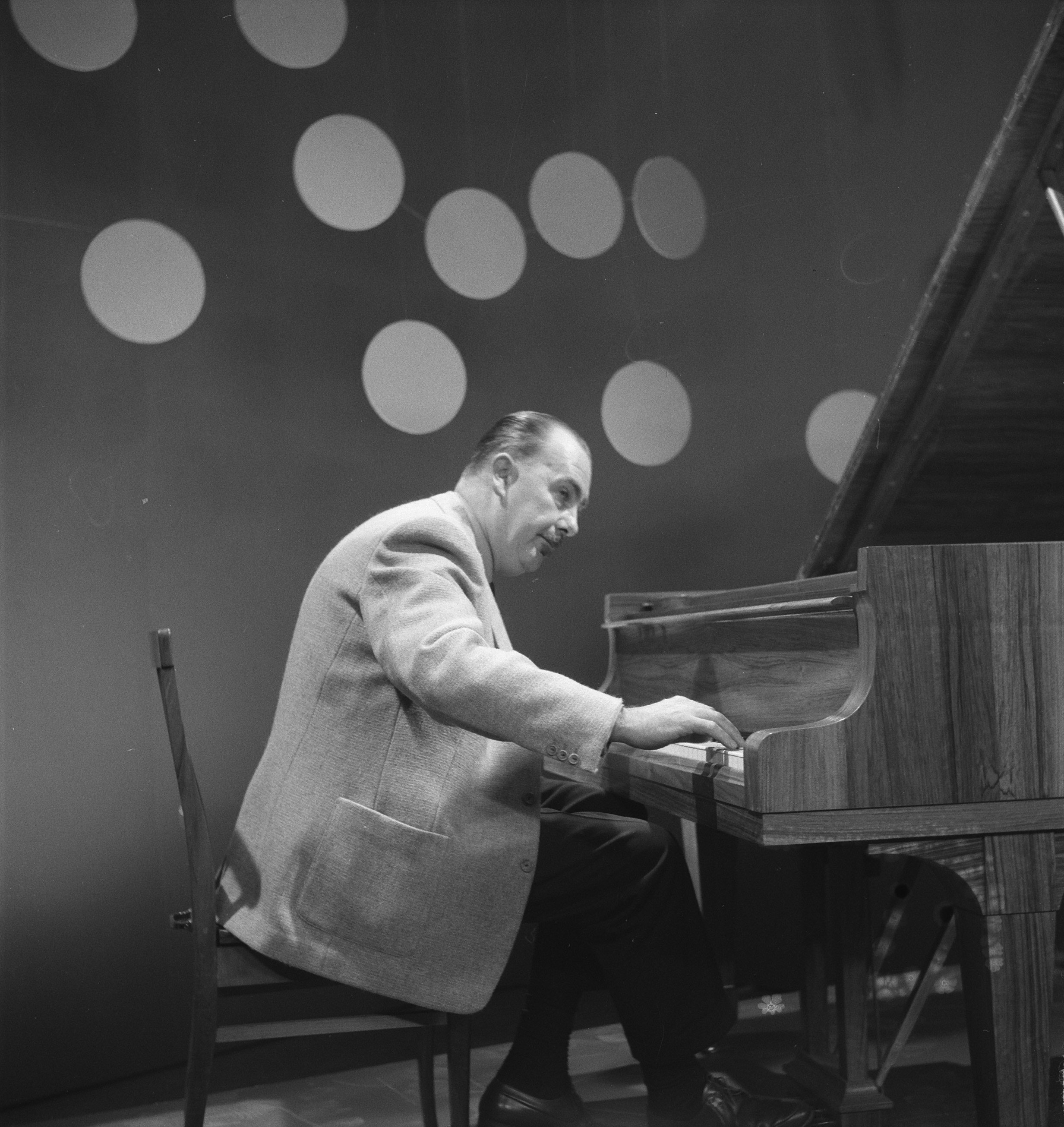
Melle Weersma (1961)

Melle Weersma (January 22, 1908, Harlingen - September 14, 1988, Putten) was a Dutch composer, arranger, and bandleader, who played in jazz, light music, and symphonic styles.

Weersma played in the late 1920s with The Electorians, and then in the early 1930s with Juan Lossas and Bobby 't Sas. From late 1931 to early 1932 he worked in Berlin as a film score arranger. He founded his own short-lived large ensemble called the Red, White and Blue Aces in 1934. Early in 1935 he worked with Jack Hylton in London, then moved to Chicago later in the year, where he did arrangements for Duke Ellington, Benny Goodman, and Andre Kostelanetz. Returning to England in 1936, he took a position as an arranger for Henry Hall at the BBC.

Weersma moved to Argentina in 1938, working with dance bands and radio programs, and that same year wrote the song "Penny Serenade", a hit on record for Nat Gonella. In 1942 he composed the music for Upa en apuros, Argentina's first animated color short directed by Dante Quinterno. During World War II he did a stint in the United States Navy, then returned to Argentina after the war, where he composed his works Criollo Suite and Peruvian Waltz (Gaviota). In 1954 he returned to the Netherlands, where he worked in the radio and records industries.
