= Alejandro Gómez (politician) =

Argentine lawyer and educator

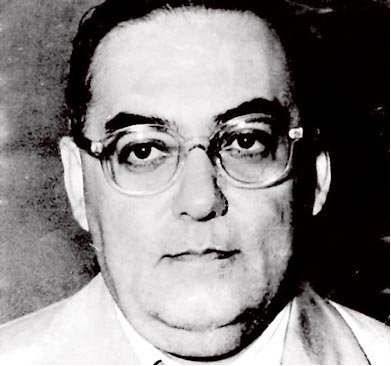

25th Vice President of Argentina
- In office May 1, 1958 – November 18, 1958
- President: Arturo Frondizi
- Preceded by: Isaac Rojas
- Succeeded by: Carlos Perette

Personal details
- Born: April 4, 1908 Rosario
- Died: February 6, 2005 (aged 96) Las Tapias, Córdoba
- Party: UCR; UCRI (1956–58)
- Spouse: María Celia Cabos
- Profession: Lawyer

Alejandro Gómez (April 4, 1908 – February 6, 2005) was an Argentine educator and lawyer who served as the Vice President of Argentina.

== Life and times ==
Gómez was born in Rosario. His father was a telegraph operator for the local rail line, and the family relocated to numerous towns within Santa Fe Province. They eventually settled in rural Berabevú, where the young man became a school teacher. His vocal support of the centrist UCR, which had been elected to power in Argentina in 1916, cost Gómez his post upon the 1930 military coup against President Hipólito Yrigoyen.

Gómez, however, did not abandon his teaching profession, and he established the Workers' Night School in Rosario, which he operated in a clandestine manner during the authoritarian Concordance regime that followed. Gómez met María Celia Cabos, and they were married in 1936. He enrolled at the Rosario campus of the National University of the Littoral (later converted to the National University of Rosario), and earned a law degree in 1940. He and his wife had three sons.

He resumed his activities in the UCR, and was elected to successive party committee posts. Gómez joined former Córdoba Province Governor Amadeo Sabattini's Intransigence and Renewal Front (MIR) upon its establishment in 1945. The MIR was a liberal wing of the UCR formed in opposition to the party's alliance with conservatives in the Democratic Union coalition. The MIR instead endorsed the populist Labor Party candidate, Juan Perón, who would go on to win the 1946 elections. Gómez, like most in the MIR, later became disillusioned with Perón and returned to the UCR fold. He joined Arturo Frondizi's UCRI, however, and became his nominee for the Vice Presidency when the latter split from the UCR during the November 1956 convention in Tucumán due to opposition of UCR leader Ricardo Balbín's hard-line stance against Peronists (who had been banned following the 1955 coup against President Perón).

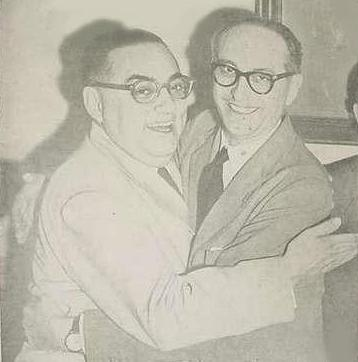
Frondizi and Gómez formed a splinter ticket following the UCR's fractious 1956 convention. Once elected, however, policy differences led to Gómez's resignation.

Frondizi and Gómez had met in 1942, and became friends. Gómez was named political director of the campaign, and as such worked to prevent rifts in the UCRI, notably in Río Negro Province, where a dissident "Green List" had emerged from within UCRI ranks. Gómez persuaded a number of top Green List candidates to rejoin the official UCRI list, and thus neutralized the rival faction; among those so persuaded was Senatorial candidate José María Guido, who was elected and would, in 1962, become President of Argentina. The UCRI ticket received the exiled Perón's endorsement late in the campaign, and the duo won the 1958 elections by 17% over Balbín's UCRP. They were inaugurated on May 1.

A serious policy dispute emerged, however, when the President announced in July that the nation's largely untapped oil resources would be open to foreign exploration via contracts to be signed with the state oil concern, YPF. This was a reversal of a policy adopted by Frondizi with his 1954 treatise, Petróleo y Política, as well as during the campaign, and elicited strong opposition from Gómez. The dispute, though not public at its outset, became the subject of an ongoing series by the satirical news magazine, Tía Vicenta, after its editor, Juan Carlos Colombres, learned of a series of meetings Gómez held with Admiral Isaac Rojas, General Domingo Quaranta (Director of State Intelligence), and others. The periodical referred to the controversy for five months with a corner photo of Gómez in an insert beside an epigraph asking: ¿A mi por que me miran? ("Why are you all looking at me?").

Amid a series of strikes in opposition to the oil contracts policy, the UCRI expelled the Vice President, thus prompting him to resign on November 18. President Frondizi became convinced that Gómez had been gathering support for a coup d'état, and declared a temporary state of siege. Its ultimate beneficiary would plausibly have been Gómez had the Armed Forces heads opted to depose Frondizi without suspending the nation's governmental institutions. Gómez and his allies, however, upheld his commitment to democracy, and believed Frondizi's accusations to be a pretext for his dismissal.

Gómez became a vocal opponent of both the policy of developmentalism advanced by Frondizi's chief domestic policy adviser, Rogelio Julio Frigerio (over its reliance on foreign direct investment), as well as of austerity measures enacted by the conservative Economy Minister Álvaro Alsogaray (particularly its cutbacks in rail services). The latter, however, were mainly the result of military demands, and following 48 ultimatums over policy disputes, President Frondizi was overthrown in 1962. Gómez later established two advocacy groups espousing economic nationalism: Movimiento Latinoamericano and Movimiento Nacional de Defensa del Petróleo y la Energía.

The former Vice President was awarded the Order of Merit of Chile by President Eduardo Frei Montalva, and named a Grand Officer of the Legion of Honor by the president of France, Charles de Gaulle. He taught public law at the University of Belgrano until his retirement in 1988, and authored numerous books. His last, Un siglo...una vida. De la soberanía a la dependencia (A Century...A life: From Sovereignty to Dependence), lamented the prioritization of foreign interests in national energy policy as a key factor in the country's decline up to then, and pointed to this as the reason for his 1958 resignation.

He retired in Las Tapias, a scenic Córdoba Province town, and died there of a brain aneurism in 2005; he was 96.
