= Maitena Burundarena =

Argentine artist (born 1962)

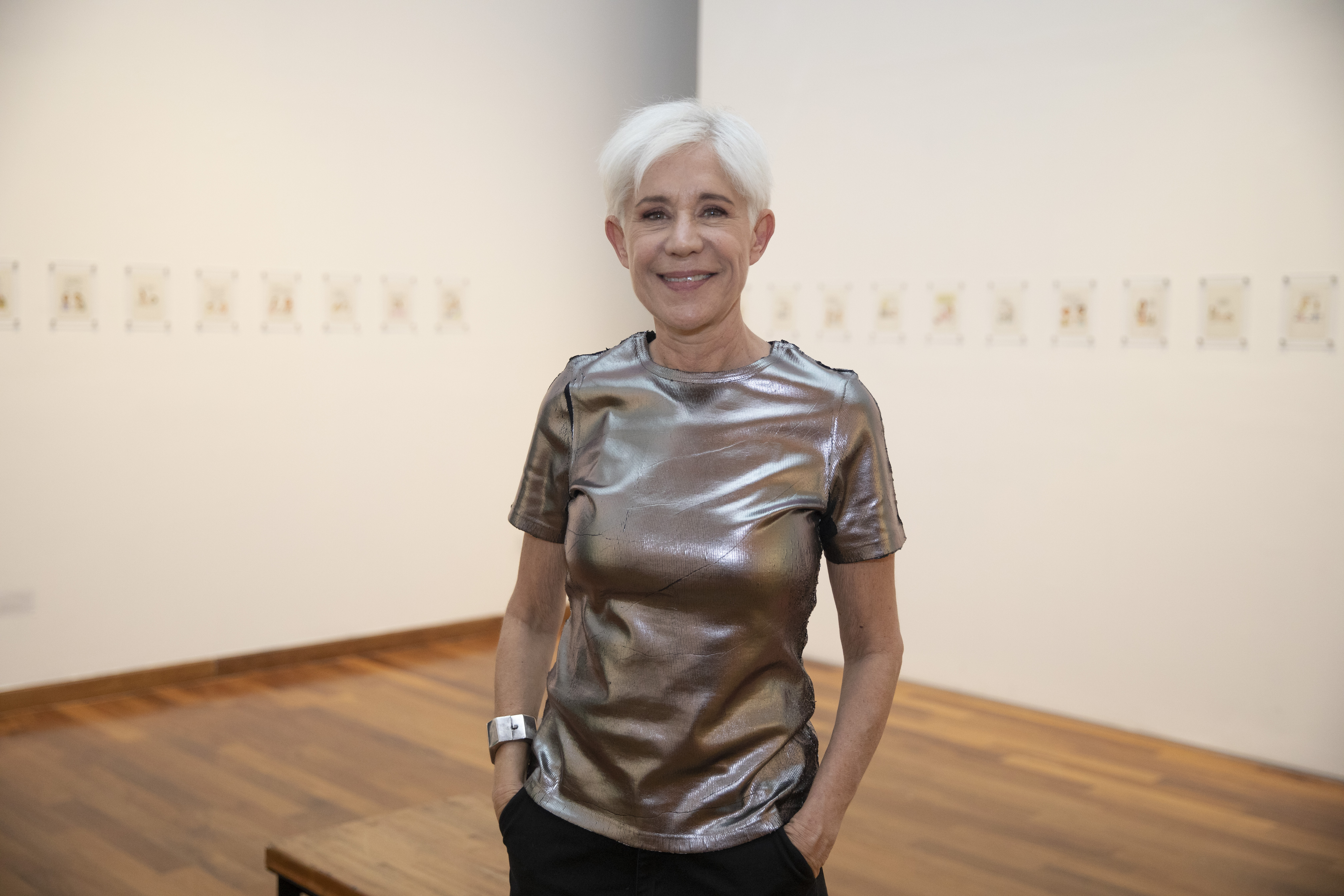
- Burundarena in 2022
- Born: May 19, 1962 (age 64) Buenos Aires, Argentina
- Area: Cartoonist
- Pseudonym: Maitena

Maitena Burundarena (Buenos Aires, May 19, 1962), better known as Maitena, is an Argentine cartoonist.

== Early works ==
Maitena drew erotic strips for several European publications, for example Makoki, in Barcelona. In Argentina, she worked in Sex Humor, Fierro (magazine), Hum®, and Cerdos y Peces.

She also worked as a graphic illustrator for Argentine magazines and newspapers, as well as publishers specialized in school texts. She was also a TV screenwriter, restaurateur and bar owner.

Her first strip, Flo, was published in Tiempo Argentino, a Buenos Aires newspaper. Her work was compiled in a book called Y en este rincón, las mujeres.

== Mujeres Alteradas ==
In 1993, Para Ti -a leading Argentine women's magazine- approached her to do a weekly humor page. Such was the origin of Mujeres Alteradas ("Women on the Edge"), a comic strip now published widely throughout the world. In 1999, Mujeres Alteradas was 'translated' from Argentine Spanish to European Spanish and started appearing in El País Semanal, the Sunday edition of El País, from Madrid. Mujeres Alteradas has been translated into several languages.

The strips have been collected into five books published by Lumen in Spain and Sudamericana, in Argentina. Mujeres Alteradas has sold 150,000 books just in Argentina.

== Superadas ==
Between 1998 and 2003, Maitena also published a daily comic panel in La Nación´s humor section, under the name Superadas. This strip is currently published in several Argentine newspapers such as La Voz del Interior (Córdoba) and Los Andes (Mendoza). The strip is also published in several other international newspapers.

Towards the end of 2002, selected strips were published as a book named Superadas 1.

In June 2003, Maitena began to publish the Sunday strip Curvas peligrosas in La Nación.

== A General Feature of Maitena's Work ==
Unlike many fellow Argentine humourists (such as Quino in Mafalda, Caloi, Roberto Fontanarrosa or Miguel Rep), who rely on their characters' circumstances, Maitena focuses on the inner feelings of the female world.

== Personal life ==
She is of Basque (maitena is Basque for "the most beloved") and Polish ancestry. Her father, Carlos Burundarena, was a Basque-stock conservative academician, the last Minister of Education (Argentina) of the Argentine dictatorship of the 1980s (he was previously chancellor of the National Technological University). Her mother was an architect with Polish ancestry. Maitena lives in Argentina. She has been married twice and has three children.

On 7 March (Lesbian Visibility Day in Argentina) 2025, she announced her engagement to writer Gabriela Cabezón Cámara.

== Published works ==
- Women on the Edge 1
- Women on the Edge 2
- Women on the Edge 3
- Women on the Edge 4
- Women on the Edge 5
- Curvas Peligrosas 1
- Curvas Peligrosas 2
- Superadas 1
- Superadas 2
- Superadas 3
