= Oski =

Oski may refer to:

- Oski the Bear, the official mascot of University of California, Berkeley
- Another name for Odin, the chief god of the Norse pantheon
- Nickname of Oscar Conti, Argentine cartoonist and humorist
