= Tía Vicenta =

Defunct Argentine political satire magazine

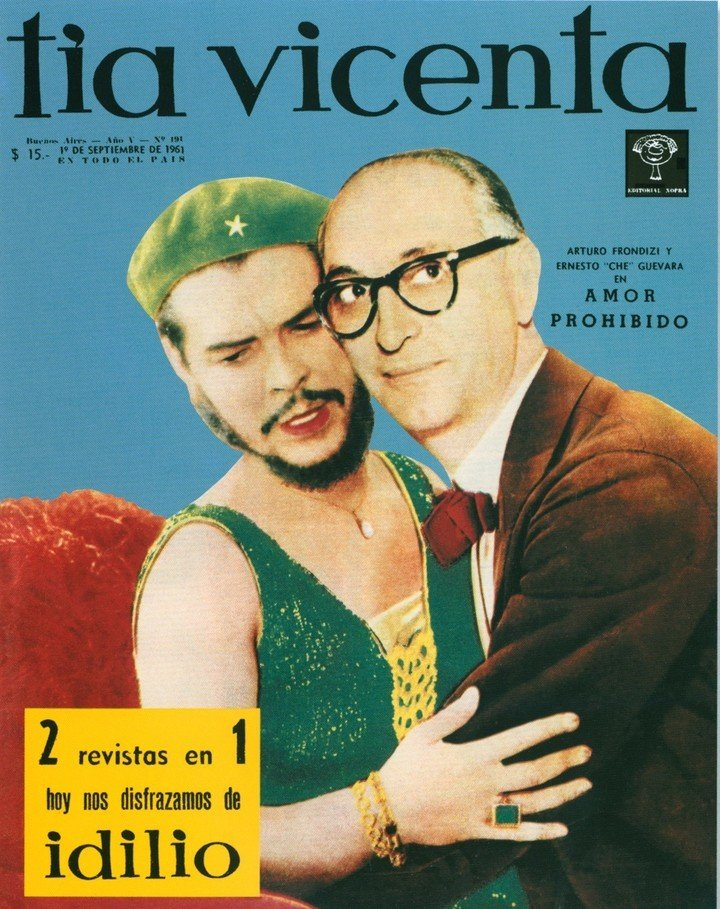
- Cover featuring Che Guevara and president Arturo Frondizi, September 1961
- Director: Landrú
- Categories: News, political satire
- Frequency: weekly
- Publisher: NOPRA (1957–60); Editorial Haynes (1960–66)
- Total circulation: 200,000–450,000 (1960–1966)
- First issue: August 20, 1957
- Final issue: July 17, 1966; 60 years ago
- Country: Argentina
- Language: Spanish

Tía Vicenta ("Aunt Vicenta") was a satirical current events magazine published in Argentina between 1957 and 1966. Created by caricature artist Juan Carlos Colombres, aka "Landrú", Tía Vicenta became highly popular, being one of the most influential magazines of its genre.

In 1970, the magazine was regarded as one of the six best political and military humor magazines in the world. Editorial Haynes published the magazine as a supplement to El Mundo newspaper, with 500,000 copies printed. After then de facto president of Argentina Juan Carlos Onganía was depicted as a walrus (a nickname given due to his big moustache), the dictatorship closed the magazine in July 1966.

== History ==
Caricaturist and commentator Juan Carlos Colombres (mostly known by his nickname "Landrú", based on his supposed resemblance to the French serial killer Henri Désiré Landru) established Tía Vicenta with fellow illustrator Oski in 1957. The current events weekly quickly earned renown for its satirical content, particularly regarding Argentine politics, and its circulation, which initially averaged 50,000, doubled shortly afterward.

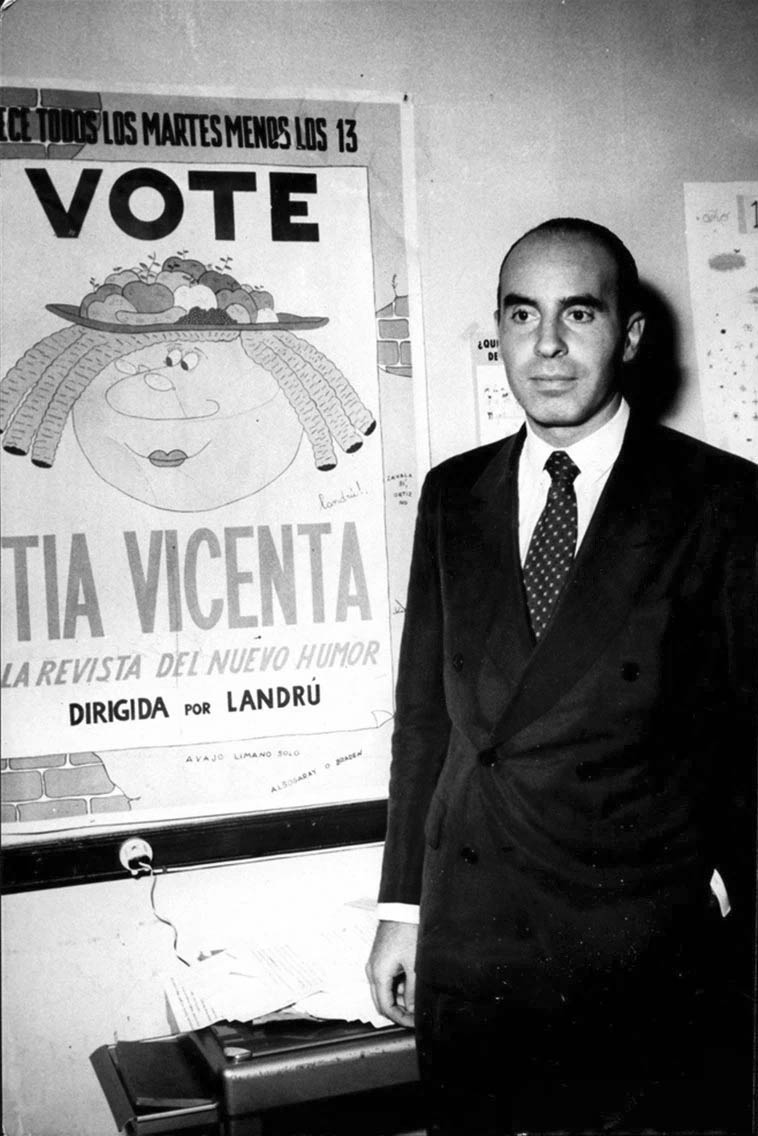
Artist Juan Carlos Colombres, aka "Landrú", creator and editor of Tía Vicenta

One of its recurring topics was the ban on Peronism, which its editorials referred to often and in violation of Decree Law 4161/56, signed by President Pedro Aramburu in 1956, which prohibited any mention of or references to exiled populist leader Juan Perón or Peronism. Another political controversy whose coverage made Tía Vicenta memorable was the dispute between President Arturo Frondizi and Vice President Alejandro Gómez regarding Frondizi's decision in 1958 to open the nation's oil fields to foreign exploration (a reversal of Frondizi's earlier stance). The Vice President had not made his opposition to this policy in public. The covers of Tía Vicenta, however, appeared for a number of weeks with a corner photo of Gómez in a circular insert with an epigraph asking: ¿A mi por qué me miran? ("Why are you looking at me?"). Gómez was forced to resign by the President in November, merely six months after their swearing in.

Tía Vicenta also appeared as a supplement to the popular news daily El Mundo beginning in 1960, and with a circulation ranging from 200,000 to 450,000 per issue it would become the best-selling magazine in the country. Numerous well known Argentine illustrators and journalists began their career at Tía Vicenta, including Quino, Faruk, Caloi, and Copi. Other noted contributors included Conrado Nalé Roxlo, Hermenegildo Sábat, and María Elena Walsh, as well as its co-founder, Oscar Conti (Oski).

Landrú used surreal humor to lampoon both politicians and prevailing issues. He made a likewise liberal use of artistic license on the magazine's covers themselves, which typically featured his caricatures (drawn as naïve art), and whose design changed frequently; to parody talk of a looming recession in 1966, for instance, he changed the magazine's name at one point to Carestía Vicenta ("Famine Vicenta"). His irreverent portrayals of General Juan Carlos Onganía, who had seized power in a 1966 coup d'état, as a walrus (a nickname with which colleagues in the Argentine Armed Forces referred to the laconic and moustachioed Onganía) resulted in the closure of Tía Vicenta by government edict in July of that year. The shuttered magazine returned as Tío Landrú from 1967 to 1969, and again returned, by its original name though in a less successful version, from 1977 to 1979.

Landrú would continue to illustrate editorials in numerous other publications in subsequent decades, notably Clarín. Edgardo Russo wrote a history of the periodical, Historia de Tía Vicenta, published by Espasa-Calpe in 1994.
