= Fierro (magazine) =

Argentine comics magazine

Fierro, originally Fierro a Fierro, was an Argentine comics magazine, with two clearly distinct runs.

== First run (1984–1992) ==
The first incarnation of Fierro was edited by Ediciones de la Urraca between September 1984 and December 1992, and ran for 100 issues, including two anthology books and special editions on Argentine comics authors, as well as supplements in some numbers.

=== Denomination ===
The title Fierro evoke the Argentinian national pride, bravery, and adventure. The complete name of the magazine, Fierro a fierro was taken from an old gaucho comic by Raúl Roux published in the magazine Patoruzito. The word remits equally to several things: it is "creole" Spanish for hierro (iron), and therefore it does reference to the metal like the leading magazines in the genre in that period, Métal Hurlant and Heavy Metal. It also evokes the poem Martín Fierro by José Hernández.

It carried the subtitle Historietas para sobrevivientes (Comics for survivors).

=== Path ===
The aim of the magazine was to gather the best of the Argentine and international production, in addition to giving space to new authors.

The cover of the first number was drawn by Oscar Chichoni, who made covers of the magazine numerous times. Its cover presented a mix of eroticism and technology, body and machine. In the inner pages were published the following stories:

| Years | Issues | Title | Writer | Artist |
|---|---|---|---|---|
| 1984 | 1-2 | The Long Tomorrow | Dan O'Bannon | Moebius |
| 1984 | 1 | Cuatro hombres en la cabaña | Fontanarrosa | Fontanarrosa |
| 1984 | 1- | Ficcionario | Horacio Altuna | Horacio Altuna |
| 1984 | 1, | Un hombre, en algún lado | Dalmiro Saenz | Carlos Nine |
| 1984 | 1, | La Batalla de las Malvinas | Ricardo Barreiro | Alberto Macagno, Marcelo Pérez |
| 1984 | Sperman | Fontanarrosa | Fontanarrosa | |

In 1984 the magazine carried out a contest designated Fierro busca a dos manos. The winner in the art category was a 15-year-old artist from Rosario that signed as Max Cachimba, and Pablo DeSantis won in the writing category. Both continued publishing in the magazine, first together, with Cachimba's drawings about De Santis' scripts, and afterwards Max Cachimba began to do his own scripts, while Pablo DeSantis worked with other cartoonists.

In 1985 Fierro began to include the supplement Óxido ("Rust"). This same year it won the prize to the best comic magazine in the 5th Barcelona International Comics Convention.

| Years | Issues | Title | Writer | Artist |
|---|---|---|---|---|
| Perramus | Juan Sasturáin | Alberto Breccia | | |
| El Sueñero | Enrique Breccia | Enrique Breccia | | |
| War III | Ricardo Barreiro | Juan Giménez | | |
| El cazador del tiempo | Enrique Breccia | Enrique Breccia | | |
| Polenta con pajaritos | El Tomi | El Tomi | | |
| 1986–1987 | Parque Chas | Ricardo Barreiro | Eduardo Risso | |
| Ministerio | Ricardo Barreiro | Francisco Solano López | | |
| Keko, el mago | Carlos Nine | Carlos Nine | | |
| Evaristo | Carlos Sampayo | Francisco Solano López | | |
| 1989 | Semblanzas Deportivas | Roberto Fontanarrosa | Roberto Fontanarrosa | |
| Metrocarguero | Enrique Breccia | Domingo Mandrafina | | |

In July 1988, after the publishing of the 47th issue, Juan Sasturain left the job of publisher for internal reasons. He was replaced by the screenwriter and writer Pablo de Santis and Juan Manuel Lima as art director.

Fierro was cancelled in its 100th issue, in December 1992. After the cancellation two books with new material and complete comics were published, in August and December 1993.

=== Legacy ===
In the words of Andrés Ferreiro and Hernán Ostuni, Fierro, in its first period, constituted "a true cultural Molotov cocktail".

An important quantity of originals of this first stage were exhibited, between January and August 2008, in the Homage to the Argentinian Comic, held in the National Centre of the Image, Angoulême, France, by initiative of José Muñoz.

== Second run (2006-2017) ==
After almost fifteen years of absence, Fierro was relaunched in October 2006 as an optional supplement of the newspaper Pagina/12. Directed by Juan Sasturain, who was director of the magazine in its first period until its 47th issue, and Lautaro Ortiz as publisher, its comeback was preceded by the promotion of the magazine by Sasturain and some of his collaborators in the Argentine television and commercials in Pagina/12.

The first number, with a cover drawn by José Muñoz, sold out in less than five days, and a second printing became necessary. The re-run coincided with an expansion of the Argentinian comic sector, and the public's desire for home-grown comics. The new subhead of the series reaffirms this: "The Argentine comic". The inclusion of foreign material is infrequent, unlike in its first version.

In its first number, the team of artists was mainly by the team who had worked in Fierro's first run. The following issues incorporated new artists, such as Juan Sáenz Valiente, Pablo Tunic, Lucas Varela, Ignacio Minaverry, Lucas Nine, Gustavo Sala, Diego Agrimbau, Salvador Sanz, Alejandra Lunik, Ariel López V., Polaco Scalerandi, and Semola Souto.

In 2007 it incorporated the supplement Picado fino, that seeks to give space to unpublished artists and a greater experimentation, emulating in some form the Subtemento Oxido of the first Fierro run. It also publishes periodically the supplement Picado grueso, that presents works of artists already consecrated, such as Enrique Breccia or El Marino Turco.

In 2012, Fierro was also published in Brazil by Zarabatana Books. It is a compilation of stories published in Argentina, besides comics by Brazilian cartoonists.

The last issue of Fierro was published in March 2017.

== Bibliography ==
- Guiral, Antoni (Coord.) (2012). Del tebeo al manga: Una historia de los cómics 9. Revistas de aventuras y de cómic para adultos. Barcelona: Panini España. Depósito Legal: GI.169-2007. ISBN 978-84-9885-903-4.
