= Oil battle =

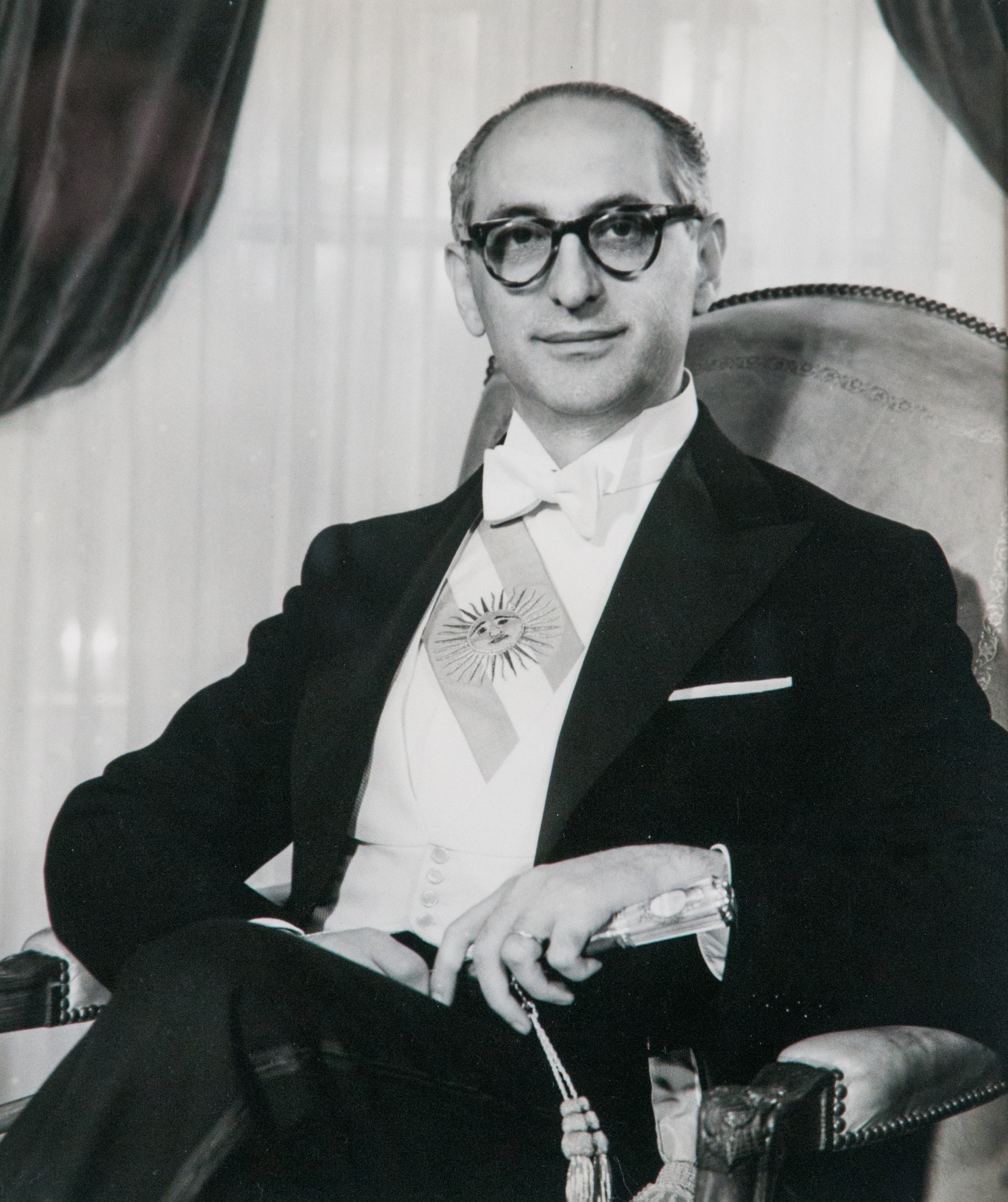
Despite the controversy sparked by the president's policies, the developmentalist government of Arturo Frondizi achieved record-breaking levels of oil extraction never before seen in Argentine history, leading to oil self-sufficiency for the first time in the country.

The oil battle (Spanish: La batalla del petróleo) was an economic battle announced by the government of Argentine president Arturo Frondizi on 24 July 1958. The aim of the "battle" was to achieve self-sufficiency in oil production. It is remembered for the ideological controversy caused by the apparent ideological about-face of the president, who had previously been critical of oil policy.

The objective was achieved within three years, but at a high political cost for the government, which lost significant support from several sectors that had backed Frondizi's candidacy, in addition to the resignation of Vice President Alejandro Gómez.

The chemist Arturo Sabato was one of the main figures in this "battle," with the exploration and exploitation areas expanded through contracts with private companies.

== History ==
=== Background ===
When Arturo Frondizi assumed the presidency of Argentina on May 1, 1958, he inherited a country with a severely weakened and bankrupt economy, an external debt of one billion dollars, and a balance of payments deficit of 300 million dollars per year. This deficit was largely caused by massive fuel imports.

Argentina faced a major issue regarding oil consumption and production: the country consumed 15.6 million tons, but produced only 5 million, meaning it had to import 10 million tons of oil a cost equivalent to one million dollars per day. This represented about a third of the value of export earnings, and the 300 million dollars spent on oil imports was what caused the deficit in the balance of payments.

In his inaugural speech before the National Congress, Frondizi outlined—among other things—some key points of his energy policy:

We must achieve energy self-sufficiency, based on the exploitation of petroleum and coal deposits and the use of hydroelectric power. This will allow us to gradually replace fuel imports, which in 1957 amounted to 318 million dollars. — Arturo Frondizi, May 1, 1958

=== Outcome ===
The defense of the contracts clings to the numbers, which show that what had not been achieved in fifty years was accomplished in three. It also invokes a range of arguments—some even based on Lenin’s own policies. — Rodolfo Pandolfi

On July 24, 1958, the president gave a national address explaining the problems and consequences of continuing to import oil. The government officially announced the Oil Battle, whose goal was to achieve oil self-sufficiency "no matter what." In his speech, Frondizi justified his ideological shift by stating that Argentina no longer had gold reserves to fund YPF, so it would be necessary to bring in foreign capital to exploit hydrocarbons—even if that meant allowing oil companies to take a share of the profits. According to Frondizi himself, from that moment on, both he and officials at all levels began receiving pressure from monopolies opposed to the new oil policy. Shortly after May 1, a representative from one of the major oil companies met with the president at the Olivos presidential residence, and the meeting ended with Frondizi in a fit of anger.On July 21, three days before the speech, the UCRI national committee and the leaders of both pro-government parliamentary blocs visited him and demanded that he abandon his plans. Most of the presidential staff opposed the agreements, with the exception of Rogelio Julio Frigerio. Labor unions and university students also opposed the plan. Though Colonel Juan Enrique Guglialmelli criticized the agreements, the armed forces overall supported them, as they saw energy self-sufficiency as vital to national defense.

The first contracts were signed with second-tier companies, as Shell and Esso distrusted the new policy and initially deemed it unprofitable. However, companies like Carl M. Loeb Rhoades, Panamerican International Oil, Tennessee, Union Oil, and The Ohio Oil accepted the new policy. Once the agreements were underway, Shell and Esso eventually agreed to negotiate with the government, securing two major zones. They invested 40 million dollars but failed to extract oil. They recouped their investment when Arturo Illia later annulled the contracts and reached multimillion-dollar out-of-court settlements. According to Frondizi, Shell and Esso never ceased to undermine the goal of self-sufficiency. In 1967, he noted that while Argentina produced 7 cubic meters of oil per well per day, Kuwait produced 1,800.

With all the progress made by YPF—such as purchasing new machinery and building pipelines—YPF managed to double its production, exceeding 10.4 million tons of oil. But to reach the 15.6 million-ton target, the government had to sign work and service contracts, especially with three companies: L.R. Development in Mendoza, Panamerican Oil in Comodoro Rivadavia, and Tennessee Gas in Tierra del Fuego. Thus, Argentina achieved oil self-sufficiency for the first time, breaking 50 years of dependence on foreign oil monopolies. The president also signed an exploitation contract with a Standard Oil subsidiary, followed by others totaling 200 million dollars, spread across 13 contracts. In addition, the government managed to resolve the energy crisis that had persisted since the administration of Juan Domingo Perón.

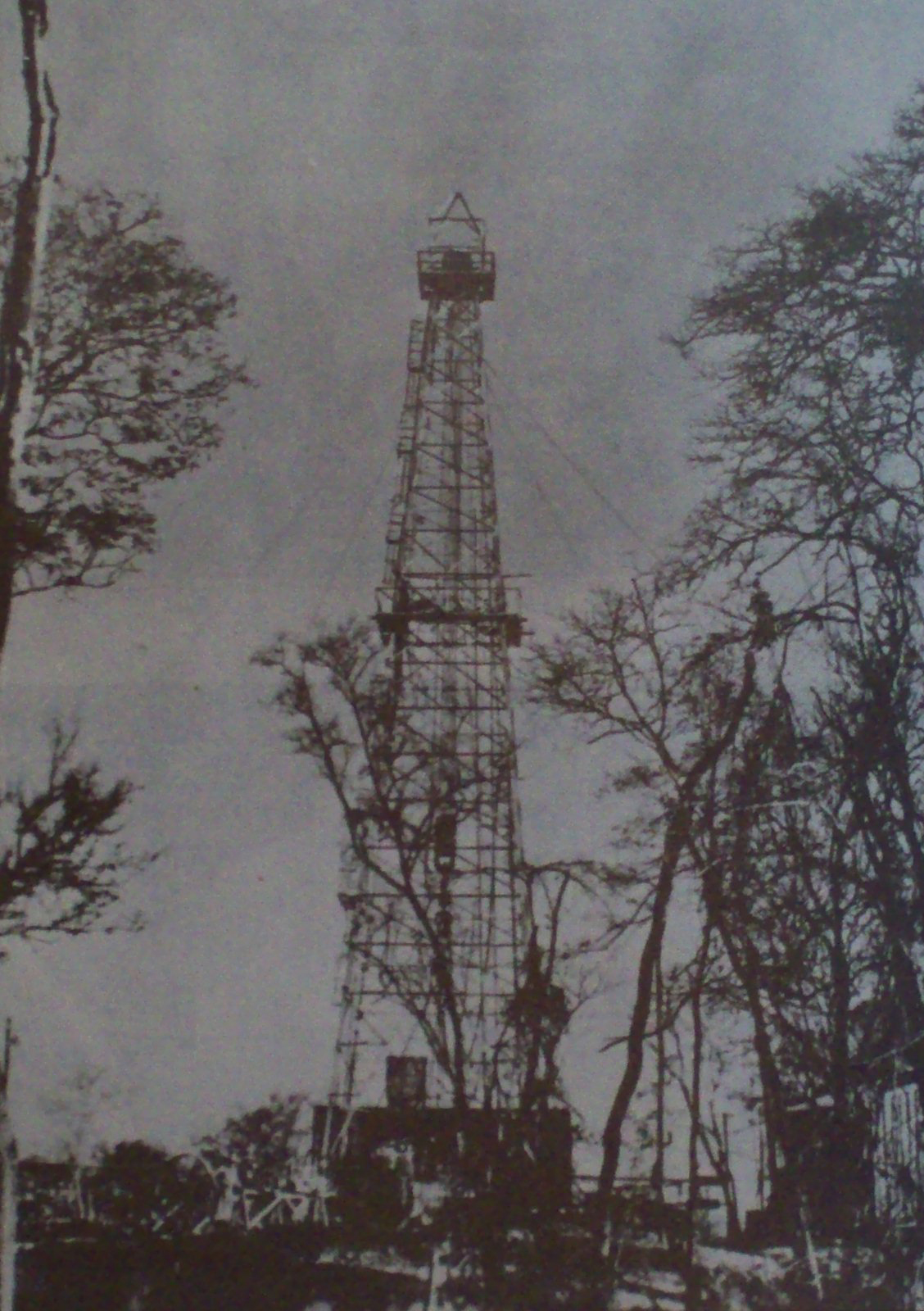
Oil drilling rig in Campo Durán, operated by YPF.

Here is a quote from the July 24, 1958 speech, in which Frondizi explains his ideological shift:

When we took office, the gold reserves amounted to 125.5 million dollars, and the total of gold and foreign currency was just over 250 million dollars. At the same time, from May 1 to December 31 [1958], we must meet foreign commitments worth 645 million dollars. Therefore, we do not have a single gram of gold in the Central Bank for YPF. — Arturo Frondizi declaring the "Oil Battle".

=== Controversies ===
The oil battle was one of the most controversial moments of Arturo Frondizi's presidency. Many members of the opposition — including some lawmakers from his own party, the UCRI — opposed the oil contracts, accusing them of being a betrayal of national interests. This led to the resignation of Vice President Alejandro Gómez.

In 1954, while still a congressman, Frondizi had published a book titled Oil and Politics (Spanish: Petroleo y politica), in which he argued that YPF did not need foreign aid or capital to achieve oil self-sufficiency. He also gave a historic speech on Radio Belgrano on July 27, 1955, in which he criticized President Juan Domingo Perón's oil contracts, describing them as "a broad colonial stripe whose mere presence would be a physical mark of vassalage." That speech laid the groundwork for his own government platform. However, once in office, Frondizi acknowledged YPF's weakness and signed contracts with U.S. companies — a complete reversal from Congressman Frondizi's stance. This dramatic policy shift sparked numerous protests and strikes, including a general strike by oil workers in September 1958, supported by the Peronists, in opposition to the contracts. In response, Frondizi declared a state of siege, arrested Peronists and Communists, and ultimately broke the Frondizi-Perón Pact. It is worth noting that Argentina's economy in 1958 was in far worse condition than it was when Frondizi first spoke out against foreign investment.

== Objectives ==
Frondizi's government set three core goals to "win" the oil battle:

1. Nationalization of oil resources
2. Monopoly of YPF
3. Oil self-sufficiency

== Announcement and implementation ==
In a nationally broadcast speech, Frondizi officially launched the "Oil Battle." Using epic and nationalist rhetoric, he described the initiative as a "relentless fight for happiness and national greatness" carried out "in the name and for the benefit of national sovereignty." He presented the country with a stark ultimatum: continue on a path of economic decline or decisively exploit domestic resources. Given the lack of public capital, he argued that cooperation with private companies was the only viable path toward urgently needed oil self-sufficiency.

Legal framework and contract modality

To give the policy a legal foundation that reinforced state sovereignty, Frondizi's government promoted and enacted Law 14.773 on Oil Nationalization in late 1958. Its first article declared that all hydrocarbon deposits were the "exclusive, inalienable, and imprescriptible property of the National State," and explicitly banned new concessions. Thus, the contracts were structured not as concessions, but as work and service agreements. Under this model, foreign companies would drill and extract oil on behalf of YPF. The state oil company retained legal ownership of the oil and the fields, and paid the companies a fixed fee for their services, partly in foreign currency and partly in Argentine pesos. This legal distinction was intended to counter accusations that the policy was a surrender of national sovereignty.

=== Agreements with foreign companies ===
The government acted swiftly, signing numerous contracts via direct negotiation rather than public bidding — another major point of controversy.

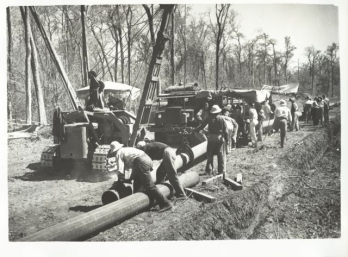
Construction of the Campo Durán gas pipeline in 1958, which brought gas to Argentine households.

Key early agreements included:

- Astra (Argentina): Drilling of 30 wells in areas designated by YPF.
- "American Group" (a consortium of U.S. and European companies): A massive agreement valued at around $700 million, including drilling of about 4,000 wells, delivery of $50 million in equipment to YPF, and construction of a domestic oil machinery factory.
- Petrofina (Belgium): Drilling of around 200 wells, with an estimated $35 million investment.

Other significant contracts were signed with Pan American Oil, Tennessee Gas Transmission, Union Oil of California, Esso (Standard Oil), and Shell, covering vast areas in Patagonia (Chubut, Santa Cruz, Tierra del Fuego), Cuyo (Mendoza), and the Northwest.

Main oil contracts 1958-1960
Company	Country of origin	Operation area	Surface area (km^{2})	Contract type
Pan American Oil	United States	Chubut and Santa Cruz	4,040	Production
Tennessee Gas	United States	Tierra del Fuego	14,000	Exploration/Production
Union Oil of California	United States	Chubut y Santa Cruz	16,000	Exploration/Production
Esso (Standard Oil)	United States	Neuquen	4,800	Exploration
Shell	UK/Netherlands	Rio Negro	30,000	Exploration
L.R. Development	United States	Mendoza	4,000	Production
CADIPSA	Argentina	Santa Cruz	32	Production
Petrofina	Belgium	Chubut	Specific Drills	Drilling
Astra	Argentina	Chubut	Specific Drills	Drilling

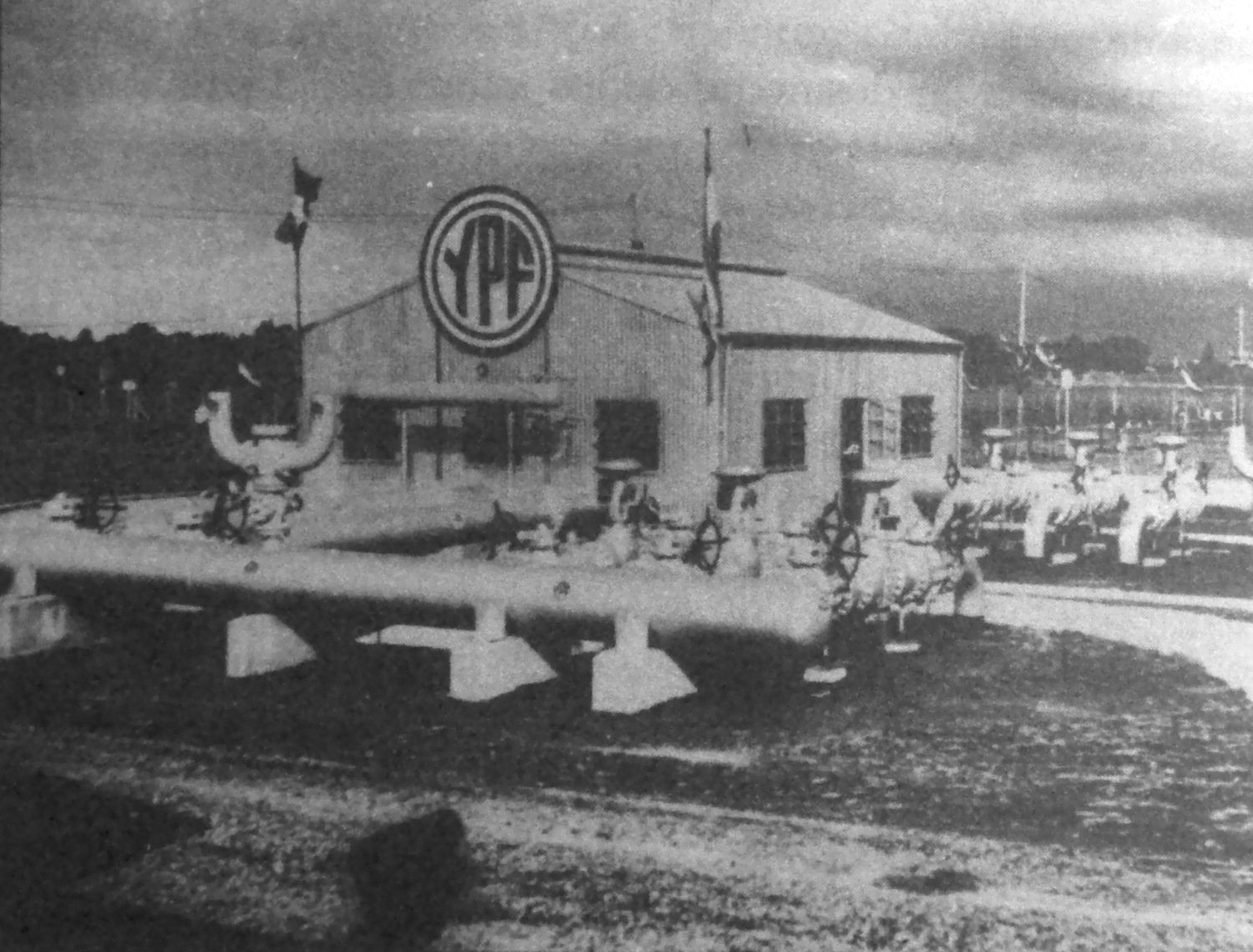
Campo Duran infrastructure during the oil battle

== Infrastructure and results ==
Although the government lost trust — particularly from the political left due to the deals with U.S. companies — the production results were undeniably positive. For the first time, Argentina achieved oil self-sufficiency. Oil reserves rose by 50%. YPF acquired 36 new drilling rigs, and in 1958 the Campo Durán gas pipeline was built. By 1960, there were 100 rigs operating, twice the number YPF previously had. This helped resolve the energy crisis that had persisted since 1951, ending the era of blackouts and electricity rationing. Even more significantly, not having to import hydrocarbons saved valuable foreign currency. This period also marked the birth of Argentina's petrochemical industry, positioning the country as a regional leader in the sector.

In 1960, a second gas pipeline was built — the General San Martín Gas Pipeline — larger in diameter and transport capacity than the earlier pipeline from Comodoro Rivadavia to Buenos Aires. The new pipeline was prompted by gas discoveries in Salta Province, and extended from Campo Durán to Buenos Aires, connecting with Bolivia for gas imports. Over four decades, gas accounted for 40% of primary energy consumption and became the cheapest and most widely used fuel. It solved much of the energy crisis, replacing liquid fuels in power generation and industry.

In total, 4,000 wells were drilled during Frondizi's four-year term. By 1962, Argentina was exporting 530 million cubic meters of fuel oil, and the cost of a cubic meter of oil dropped from $20 to $6. Thanks to new pipelines and gas infrastructure, the country was able to supply homes and industries with gas, replacing more expensive and less efficient solid and liquid fuels.

With Patagonia producing gas from Loma de la Lata in the Neuquén Basin, new pipelines — NeuBA I and II — were built to bring gas from Neuquén to Buenos Aires. Another line connected Neuquén to Mendoza and to eastern provinces, extending natural gas access to industrial regions and densely populated areas through a wide network of primary and secondary gas pipelines.

== Nulification of contracts ==
=== Oil policy under Arturo Illia ===
After Frondizi was overthrown in March 1962, and following an interim administration, Arturo Illia (UCRP) won the 1963 elections. Fulfilling one of his party's main campaign promises, on November 15, 1963, President Illia signed Decrees 744/63 and 745/63, which declared the oil contracts "absolutely null and void due to illegitimacy and damage to the rights and interests of the Nation.

=== Consequences ===
The nulification had significant negative consequences. Internationally, it sparked a serious diplomatic conflict with the United States and damaged Argentina's reputation as a safe and reliable destination for foreign investment. FDI fell sharply, from over $100 million in 1962 to only $33 million in 1964.

On the production side, without the investment and technology of the contractors, oil output stagnated and then declined, even as domestic demand continued to rise. This forced Argentina to resume expensive oil imports, thereby losing the oil self-sufficiency it had briefly achieved.
