= Isidoro Cañones =

- Isidoro Cañores (right) and Cachorra Bazooka (left)

Publication information
- First appearance: 1935
- Created by: Dante Quinterno

In-story information
- Partnerships: Patoruzu

Isidoro Cañones is a fictional character from Argentine comics created by Dante Quinterno. He was created as a supporting character of Patoruzu, but got his own comic book afterwards, which is periodically reprinted. The character is often referenced as a "playboy", but only with the meaning of a man seeking leisure and a high-society lifestyle, without references to sex. The character has been used in a 2007 animated movie.

== Publication history ==
Before the creation of Isidoro, Quinterno created other characters of a similar style. The first one was Manolo Quaranta, for the "La Novela Semanal" magazine. It was followed by Don Gil Contento and Julián de Monte Pío. This last character was usually involved in games, horse races and nocturnal life, and had Patoruzu as a supporting character. However, popular reception modified this, and Patoruzu became the main character, with Julian as the supporting one. Quinterno also created Pepe Torpedo for a comic strip in La Razón, oriented towards automovilism.

Quinterno left La Razón and its related publications, and he managed to keep the copyright over Patoruzu. The newspaper kept the other characters, and published Julián de Monte Pío as a stand-alone character. Pepe Torpedo was simply discontinued. Quinterno created a new character for another newspaper, Isidoro Batacazo, a businessman interested in horse races.

Quinterno resumed the publication of Patoruzu in 1935, outside of La Razón. To fill the role of Julián de Monte Pío, whose rights were still held by the newspaper, he created Isidoro Cañones, a new character with combined characteristics of Quaranta, Contento, Julián and Batacazo.

Isidoro sas, since his first appearance, Patoruzu's representative. The comic book was based in the dichotomy between both characters, with Patoruzu being full or virtues and Isidoro full of flaws. Isidoro's attempts to steal money from Patoruzu or have a high lifestyle without working were the usual action that started most plots.

Isidoro started to be featured in solo stories without Patoruzu in 1940, and the title of the main comic book was changed to include both Patoruzu and Isidoro in it. In his own stories, the role of Patoruzu was filled by Isidoro's uncle, the colonel Urbano Cañones. The success of Patoruzu also led to the creation of Patoruzito, a child version of Patoruzu, which included as well a child adaption of Isidoro, Isidorito. Unlike the main character, Isidorito always stayed as a supporting character for Patoruzito.

== Characters ==
There are few recurring characters in the comic strips about Isidoro, and most other characters are used for individual stories. However, as Isidoro is portrayed as a dandy, many characters interact with him as if they had known each other from before. The first steady character related to Isidoro to be created was his uncle Urbano Cañones. This character is an aged colonel that tries to force Isidoro to give up his lifestyle and find a job or develop more serious habits. It was introduced in "The Irascible Colonel" story of the Patoruzu comic book. The first full solo story of Isidoro was a remake of this story, with Patoruzu and Upa removed from the plot. The remake introduced as well another recurring character, the captain "Metralla". Both last names, "Cañones" and "Metralla", represent military-related Spanish terms ("cannons" and "shrapnel" each), and other similar minor characters used for specific stories are named following the same recurring joke.

Isidoro has a partner, named Cachorra Bazooka. In line with the aforementioned joke, she's the niece of another colonel, friend of Cañones, but which remains an unseen character during the series, used for another recurring joke where Isidoro always fail to meet or see him. Cachorra holds a "secret identity": although she shares most of his traits, as a female version of Isidoro, she deceives Cañones, Metralla and the other military characters by posing as a reputable and innocent young woman.

== Other media ==
There were attempts to make a TV series about Isidoro in the 1970s, with Santiago Bal in the main role, but were never aired. Patoruzito was featured in a pair of animated films, including Isidorito in them. The first adaption of Isidoro Cañones was done in the 2007 animated movie Isidoro: La Película, voiced by Dady Brieva and Luciana Salazar.

== Bibliography ==
- Accorsi, Diego (2004). Biblioteca Clarín de la Historieta: Isidoro (in Spanish). Buenos Aires: Clarín. ISBN 950-782-382-4.
