= Rico Tipo =

Argentine comic magazine (1944–1972)

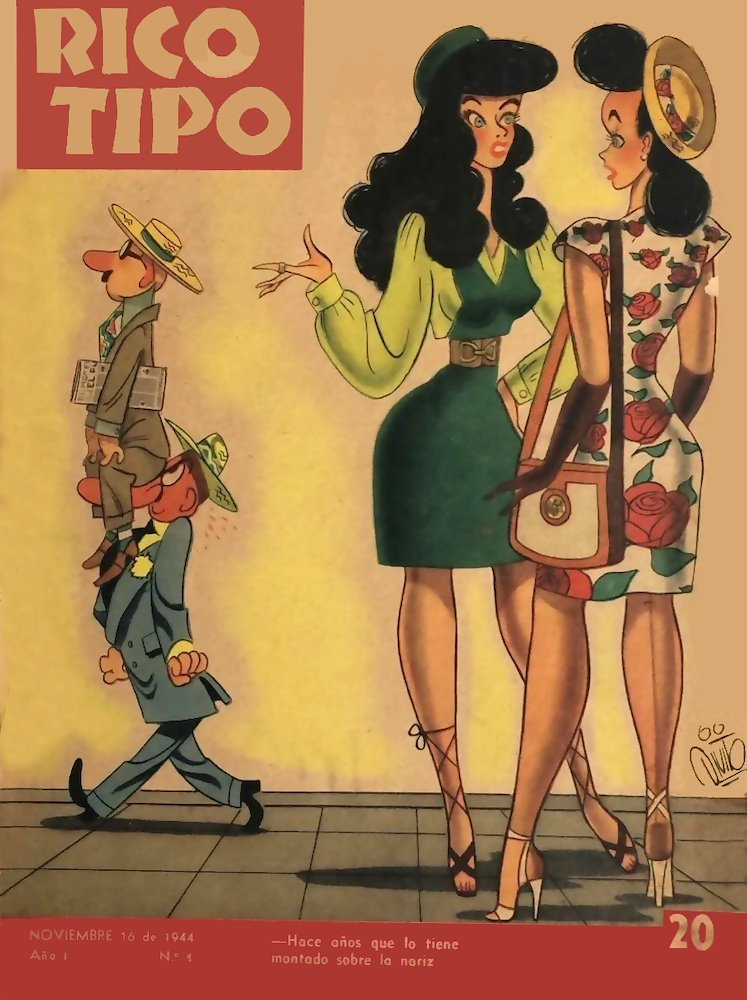
- First issue of Rico Tipo magazine (November 16, 1944)
- Frequency: Weekly
- First issue: 1944
- Final issue: 1986
- Country: Argentina
- Language: Spanish

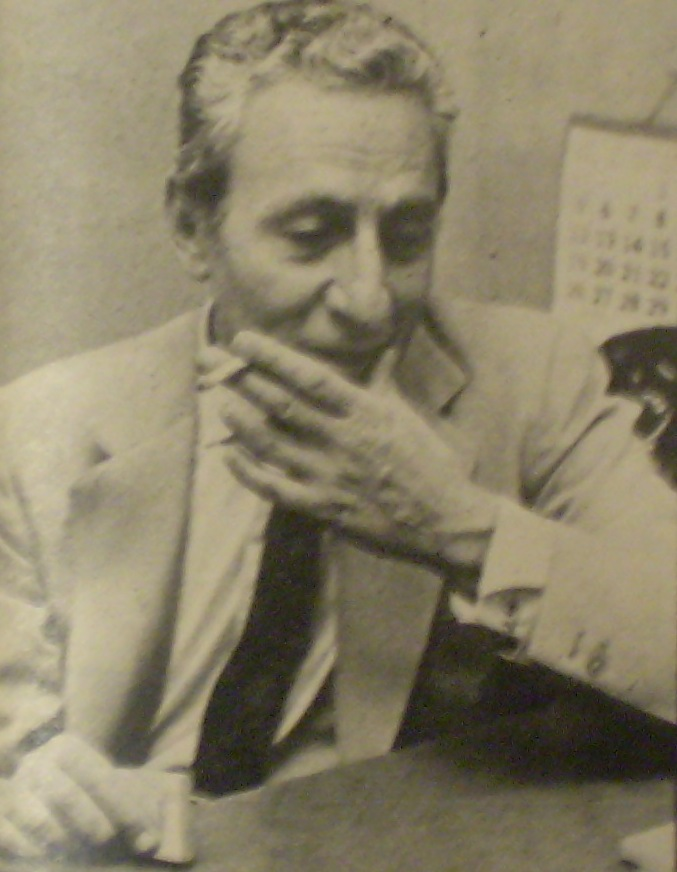
Guillermo J. Divito, founder, editor and contributor to the magazine

Rico Tipo was a weekly Argentine comic magazine that appeared from late 1944 until 1972, founded and directed by Guillermo Divito. It was among the main comic magazines in Argentina, others being Patoruzú (launched in 1936) and Satiricón (founded in 1972).

The second era of Rico Tipo was launched in August 1978 by Cielosur Editora. The same publishing house relaunched a third era in 1986, which was short-lived.

== Origins ==
José Antonio Guillermo Divito joined the stable of artists at the Patoruzú weekly as a young man, where he began drawing his first illustrations of Chicas (Girls). The magazine's director, Dante Quinterno, disapproved of the great sensuality of the Chicas, and suggested tweaks and longer skirts. Tired of this interference, and unable to get a raise of pay, Divito decided to create his own magazine Rico Tipo, which was launched on 16 November 1944. By the next year it had a weekly print run of around 350,000 copies.

== Contents and contributors ==
In addition to the Chicas, Divito included in Rico Tipo a whole series of characters that portrayed aspects recognizable to the average citizen: Pochita Morfoni, an obese woman who only thinks about food; Fulmine, an ugly man dressed in black who brings bad luck and misfortune; Fallutelli, prototype sycophantic employee and traitor to his fellows; Bombolo, a fat good-natured and naive man who cannot understand figurative speech and always take things literally; Gracielita, a very modern, waspish girl. The most important character was Dr. Merengue, whom Pablo de Santis in his book Rico Tipo y las Chicas de Divito called "a sort of criollo Mr. Hyde". Dr Merengue behaved as required by the more conservative social conventions: serious, formal, fair, accurate and dispassionate, never losing his composure. But in the last square of the strip, his alter ego revealed his true feelings or thoughts.

Besides Divito, Rico Tipo included the cream of Argentine humorous writing and graphics at the time, and trained future generations of writers and artists who took their first steps at the magazine. These included Oscar Conti ("Oski"), Alejandro del Prado ("Cale"), Rodolfo M. Taboada, Horacio S. Meyrialle, Miguel Angel Bavio Esquiú, Abel Ianiro, Joaquín Lavado ("Quino"), Tomás Elvino Blanco, Rafael Martínez, Guillermo Guerrero and many others. Adolfo Mazzone's character Piantadino appeared in the magazine.

== Peak of popularity ==
Rico Tipo had two decades of glory, the 1940s and 1950s, during which the magazine had huge popular acceptance. The adult population enjoyed the drawing, characters and humor in which passions and sensuality were not entirely absent. The Chicas de Divito (Divito Girls), especially, distinguished the magazine from its rivals. The magazine was so successful and popular that it influenced fashion in Buenos Aires at the time. Women wanted to look like the Divito Girls who often appeared on the covers of the magazine. Men admired that style of woman, and also adopted the costumes of the Divito's male characters, with double-breasted suits with long jackets and many buttons.

== Decline ==
The emergence of a more liberal attitude to sexuality in the late sixties began to weaken the influence of the magazine. Political events in the country also affected the magazine. Survival of the publication by the end of the sixties depended on Divito's changing his style. Divito, who died in 1969, never saw the demise of the magazine, which came three years later, nor a change in style that probably he would not have liked.

== Second and third era ==
The second era of Rico Tipo was launched in August 1978 by Cielosur Editora, under the direction of Eduardo Ferro. The same publishing house relaunched a third era in 1986, which was short-lived. Around 1979, Rico Tipo published the first works of Sergio Langer, as well as those of Francisco Mazza.
