= Upa en apuros =

- Directed by: Dante Quinterno
- Written by: Dante Quinterno
- Edited by: Tito Davison
- Music by: Melle Weersma
- Release date: November 20, 1942 (Buenos Aires)
- Running time: 12 minutes
- Country: Argentina
- Language: Spanish

Upa en apuros is a 1942 Argentine short animated colour film written and directed by Dante Quinterno. The film premiered on November 20, 1942 at the Ambassador cinema in Buenos Aires. At the 1943 Argentine Film Critics Association Awards, Quinterno won the Special Prize (Premio especial) for the film due to it being the first animated colour film in Argentine and Latin-American cinema.

It's an adaptation of the Argentine comic strip Patoruzú.
