= Boogie, el aceitoso =

Oily Boogie
- Boogie as of 1987

Publication information
- First appearance: 1972
- Created by: Roberto Fontanarrosa

Oily Boogie or Boogie, the Oily (in Spanish: Boogie, el Aceitoso) is a character from comic strips in Argentina, created by Roberto Fontanarrosa. He is a fictional Vietnam veteran, soldier and bounty hunter, and is used to make parody of racism, violence, nationalism, and sexism, which are included as exaggerated character traits.

His comic strips were collected in 10 books, and in a complete Todo Boogie ("All Boogie"). An animated film adaptation of the character was made in 2009.

== Publication history ==
Boogie was created by Roberto Fontanarrosa in the 1970s, as a comedic parody of Dirty Harry. The original style was similar to that of Hugo Pratt, but slowly evolved into a style of its own. Fontanarrosa created the character in 1972, as an inside joke with the comic book artist "Crist". Crist showed it to Alberto Cognini, head of the "Hortensia" magazine from Cordoba, who published it. Fontanarrosa found a direction for his artistic career in making parodies of stereotyped stock characters. Of all those, he decided to keep working on Boogie and Inodoro Pereyra (a parody of a gaucho).

The first compilation of his comic strips was published in 1974, and in the 1980s was included in the magazines Humor, Superhumor and Fierro, published by Ediciones de la Urraca. The character ceased publication in the 1990s, following the general decline in the use of killer characters.

The strips were published abroad as well, in 1975 was published in a book in Italy, renamed as "Bogart". Brazil renamed him as Boogie, o Seboso and Italy renamed him later as Boogie, l'Oleoso.

== Bibliography ==
Accorsi, Diego (2006). "Un poco de historia". Nueva biblioteca Clarín de la Historieta (in Spanish). Buenos Aires: Clarín. pp. 12–14. ISBN 950-782-893-1.
