= Sergio Langer =

Argentine cartoonist and illustrator (born 1959)

- Born: Sergio Eduardo Langer; 25 June 1959 (age 67); Buenos Aires, Argentina
- Occupations: Cartoonist, illustrator
- Years active: 1979–present
- Known for: Lápiz Japonés, La Nelly, Mamá Pierri
- Website: kioskolanger.com.ar

Sergio Eduardo Langer (born 25 June 1959) is an Argentine cartoonist and illustrator known for his political satire and dark humour. He co-founded the independent comics magazine Lápiz Japonés and created the satirical character Mamá Pierri. With writer Rubén Mira, he created La Nelly, a daily comic strip about a Buenos Aires housewife that ran in the Argentine newspaper Clarín from 2003 to early 2016.

== Early life and career ==
Langer was born in Buenos Aires to a mother of Romanian origin and a father of Polish origin. His mother survived imprisonment in concentration camps during the World War II. He studied architecture and worked at an architectural firm while publishing cartoons. His first cartoons appeared in the Argentine humour magazines Rico Tipo and Humor Registrado in 1979. He left architecture in 1987 to draw full-time.

In 1991 he moved to New York and signed with a cartoon syndicate founded by Jerry Robinson. His cartoons on international politics appeared in publications including Newsweek, the Miami Herald and the Los Angeles Times. He returned to Argentina in 1992.

== Lápiz Japonés ==
In 1993 Langer and Diego Bianki co-founded Lápiz Japonés, an independent comics magazine inspired by Raw. It brought together established and emerging cartoonists and became part of the revival of Argentine comics in the 1990s. In 1994 the Quaker Oats Company sued over the first issue's cover, which reworked the company's trademark in a pop art style. The case ended in the cartoonists' favour four years later.

== Mamá Pierri and La Nelly ==
Langer's character Mamá Pierri, an authoritarian mother through whom he satirised intolerance, first appeared in the Argentine edition of Les Inrockuptibles and later in the satirical magazine Barcelona.

Langer and Mira began publishing La Nelly in Clarín in September 2003. The strip satirised middle-class life in Buenos Aires through the experiences of its title character, a housewife. Its portrayal of Argentina's sovereign debt default drew coverage from The Wall Street Journal. The strip ended in January 2016.

== Later work ==
Langer and Chilean cartoonist José "Pepe" Palomo collaborated on Satánicos, a collection of cartoons satirising the Catholic Church. Langer's 2015 collection Judíos (Jews) uses dark humour to explore Jewish identity, his family's experiences and the memory of the Holocaust. Langer cited the 2015 Charlie Hebdo shooting as one of the events that led him to expand the book and rewrite its introduction. He had previously served on a festival jury in Cuba with Charb and Georges Wolinski, both of whom were killed in the attack.

After leaving Clarín, Langer opened a studio in the Buenos Aires neighbourhood of La Paternal, where he began making larger drawings and working in ceramics. In 2024 his exhibition ZooLanger opened at the Museo Genaro Pérez in Córdoba. In 2025 he organised Gaza en la Mira, a group exhibition that opened in Buenos Aires and later travelled to the Museo de Arte y Memoria in La Plata.

== Recognition ==
Langer won first prize for cartooning from Argentina's Association of Journalistic Entities (ADEPA) in 1999 and received a Diploma of Merit for cartooning from the Konex Foundation in 2022. In 2024 the Buenos Aires City Legislature named him a Distinguished Personality in Culture.

== Selected books ==
- Langer blanco y negro. Eudeba, 2000.
- Nelly Argentinísima. With Rubén Mira. Del Nuevo Extremo, 2006.
- Mamá Pierri. Barcelona, 2011.
- Satánicos. With José "Pepe" Palomo. Contracultura, 2013.
- Judíos. Planeta, 2015.
- El libro de oro de La Nelly. With Rubén Mira. Red Editorial, 2022.
