= Asociación de Historietistas Independientes =

Argentine comics creators formed the Asociación de Historietistas Independientes (Spanish for Association of Independent Comic Creators) at Buenos Aires convention Fantabaires in 1996, to collectively address the challenges of independent publishing. Soon, more than 100 magazines throughout Argentina sported the AHI logo. AHI's first major accomplishment was Historieta Bajo Tierra (Underground Comics), a convention that brought together the entire Argentine indie comics community. Building on the success of this event, AHI bought a stand at Fantabaires in 1998 to nurture the previously nonexistent indie comics market. Other accomplishments included putting a common logo on the covers of member comics and organizing events to display and disseminate good new works.

AHI kept growing in 1998 as new offices popped up throughout the country. AHI held its first national meeting in the Che Plaza of Rosario, Argentina. At this event, members reaffirmed their commitment to collectively producing independent comics. Furthermore, many participants said that for the first time, they felt truly Argentine.

In 1999, irreconcilable differences emerged between certain constituents. One group split from AHI and formed independent publishing collective La Productora. Maintaining informal connections throughout the country and putting national aspirations of earlier years on the backburner, AHI-Rosario emerged as the strongest group to continue the AHI tradition. Entrance into AHI-Rosario is open to all dedicated to publishing independent comics and related materials. In self-publishing, AHI celebrates the freedom of expression, complete individual creator control over material and the close relationship of the creator to the final product. Their goals include supporting indie creators in producing and distributing their works. Working with a large local comics shop, AHI organizes the annual Leyendas convention that includes comics, RPGs and sci-fi.
