= Declaration of Avellaneda =

The Declaration of Avellaneda was the main platform of the intransigent movement inside the Argentine political party known as Radical Civic Union (Unión Cívica Radical, UCR). It was issued on April 4, 1945, in Avellaneda, province of Buenos Aires.

Briefly, its main points were:

1. The history of Argentina is described as the struggle between popular, progressive ideals against a backward oligarchy.
2. Economy is considered as a medium to obtain higher ends, collective and individual.
3. Referring to the agrarian problem, it is said that the land should be for the people that work it, either individually or collectively owned. It should not be used for business that speculates with it.
4. All national resources should be nationalized. All sources of natural energy, public companies and international and national monopolies that prevent the economic development of the county will be nationalized, and their control given to the nation, provinces or cities.
5. The state will defend all small companies that are independent. It will also assure that no barriers will be set up to stop the economic activity.
6. The industrial development will be global, and it will not be based on low wages.
7. The internal problems of the party will be solved, the objective is to unify it under its doctrine as well as appealing to individuals that are known to be capable of following the objectives proposed.
8. This declaration rejects any pact with other political forces. The country must be governed by organic parties, and the UCR as an organic party intends to take by itself the responsibility of structuring a new Argentina.
