= La Productora =

La Productora is an independent collective publishing group based in Morón, Argentina in Gran Buenos Aires. The organization emerged from the Asociación de Historietistas Independientes (Association of Independent Comic Creators - AHI), as a result of irreconcilable differences between constituents. One group within AHI, including the president and vice-president of the organization, began to feel that AHI's openness to all creators compromised their artistic goals. This group split from the organization in 1999 and formed their own group. In addition to a common logo, each comic produced by La Productora has the same mini-comic format. Furthermore, each member of this small group of six creators must submit their work to a collective process of reviews, critique and improvement.
