= Fantabaires =

Fantabaires is a comics convention in Buenos Aires that started in 1996. Unlike salons in Europe, which are typically organized by major publishers, this convention was organized by a local comic shop and a couple local comic magazines. At the first convention, creators formed the Asociación de Historietistas Independientes (Association of Independent Comic Creators).
