= Leyendas (convention) =

Fantasy and science fiction convention in Argentina

- Status: Not active
- Genre: Comics, Sci-Fi, RPG
- Venue: C.E.C
- Locations: Rosario, Santa Fe
- Country: Argentina
- Inaugurated: 1999
- Most recent: 2008
- Attendance: 1650+ in 2007
- Organizer: AHI Rosario y Milenario Comics.
- Website: http://www.leyendas.ahiros.com.ar

Leyendas was a fantasy and science fiction convention focusing on all kinds of comics, cartoons, anime/manga and other popular forms of art, as well as card, strategy and role-playing games, held annually in Rosario, Argentina, since 1999. It was hosted at the Centro de Expresiones Contemporáneas (CEC), a large, austere brick building formerly part of the port's facilities.

The convention was organized by the Asociación de Historietistas Independientes (Spanish for Association of Independent Comic Creators) (Asociación de Historietistas de Rosario, AHI) and by a local comics store (Milenario Comics ), and it was supported by several other organizations, including the Municipality of Rosario.

The convention featured exhibitions of art by professional and amateur graphic artists, introductory role-playing sessions, film projections, talks and lectures, etc. In addition to these, Leyendas traditionally ends with performances by cover bands and/or karaoke, and with a costume contest (Japanese-style cosplay or otherwise).

Leyendas held its last edition in 2008 (the convention's 10th anniversary). After that and for two years there was no other likewise event, until famous Argentine artist Eduardo Risso inaugurated the annual convention Crack Bang Boom, which has the same outline and purpose as Leyendas. Crack Bang Boom resumes Leyendas basic form (an outlet for North and South American comics as well as, fantasy, science fiction, anime and a famous Cosplay contest) and uses its legacy to push forward as the new event which gathers an increasingly big size of attendees every year since its first edition in 2010.
