= Yo, Matías =

Yo, Matías is an Argentine comic strip, created by the cartoonist Fernando Sendra in 1993. It currently appears in the Clarín newspaper.

== Characters ==
Matías: He is the main character in the comic, with his mother. His little world is his school, his home and his neighbourhood. His fantasy, imagination, worries and wishes, create the core of the story. He usually appears with his mother in most of the episodes. He almost always uses the same red T-shirt, blue shorts and black shoes. His best friend used to be Tatiana, but now that Malena and he are in love, he doesn't spend so much time with her. His surname is Urtizú.

Matías' mother: She is a woman who loves her son, with all of a mother's passion but that also wants to keep her identity as a woman and her individuality as a person without immolating in her only role of mother. She wants to make other people love her, to be attractive. She never appears in the comic, although you can imagine her using many different kinds of facial masks.

The psychoanalyst: He is the only adult and male character in the comic that appears in it with some frequency. His function is to allow some space for reflections that a boy or a woman couldn't do. This character also talks about his conflicts with money, his job, etc. Evidently, he is a psychoanalyst who needs some therapy. His real name is Dr. Seisdedos (six fingers).

Malena: She is a girl from Matias' class, who was never shown, and is Matias' real love, but is a childish love. Malena also loves Matías, but they are just kids, so this is not love, is a little love. Actually, she makes Matías to behave in a more innocent and childlike way as normal. Love life: They fell in love when everyone in Matias' school were fighting and arguing in a break; the teacher told everyone to have mutual respect. In the next break, Matias wanted to have mutual respect towards Malena, a classmate, but she didn't have mutual respect towards him. Matias stared non-stop at Malena and she said: "¿Que mirás, tarado?" ("What are you looking at, moron?). Matias answered: "Te tengo respeto mutuo, gansa" ("I'm having mutual respect towards you, birdbrain") and they were punished and sent to the school's headmistress' office. At the beginning, they held their hands each time they heard steps, then, they held their hands for when they heard steps, and finally, they couldn't hear steps because they only thought about them holding their hands. When the headmistress arrived at her office, she asked why Matias and Malena were there and Matías answered that they were there because they were staring at each other like San Martín and Sarmiento. The principal looked at them and said: "Bueno, vayan y pórtense como Belgrano" ("Well, go away and behave as Belgrano"). And they left the office, holding their hands, but hiding it. So finally, they formed a little and hidden love.

Tatiana: She is Matias' best friend although he doesn't understand her very much. Tatiana loves him, although he doesn't love her, he is just her friend and is in love with Malena. Tatiana is also considered to be a nerd, because she is the most clever student in Matias' school, and also because she uses glasses, with makes her look intelligent, and an orthopedic aid. She always competes with Malena, as both of them love Matias.

The Rodríguez tortoise: Matias' male tortoise. He is always eating, sleeping and looking for an impossible girlfriend. Although he is a male tortoise, sometimes he gets confused and lays eggs. Matias has given him a lot of different names and then changes back to the original name he chose, but the tortoise wants to be called Rodriguez.

The cockroach: A cockroach from the comic strip "Prudencio", that is now in this comic strip.

Catalina: Matias' bottle-dog pet.

Lazlo: Matias' friend from Europe.

Juan: A three/four-year-old kid, neighbor of Matias.

== Books ==
Prudencio y Matías

Yo, Matias 1

Yo, Matias 2

Yo, Matias 3

Yo, Matias 4

Yo, Matias 5

Yo, Matias 6

Yo, Matias 7

Yo, Matias 8

Yo, Matias 9

Yo, Matias 10

El Diario Íntimo de Matias

Yo, Matias - El Regreso del Rulo Rebelde

Yo, Matias - Twist, Rock... y Mucha Conga!

El Diario Íntimo de Matias - La Verdad of the Milaneising

Yo, Matias - Al Desnudo

Yo, Matías - Cosas de Poca Gravedad

Yo, Matías - Lo Importante es Saber Caer

El Diario Íntimo de Matias - Recuerdos que no me Olvido

Qué bueno está ser chico 1

Qué bueno está ser chico 2
