= Fernando Sendra =

Argentine cartoonist

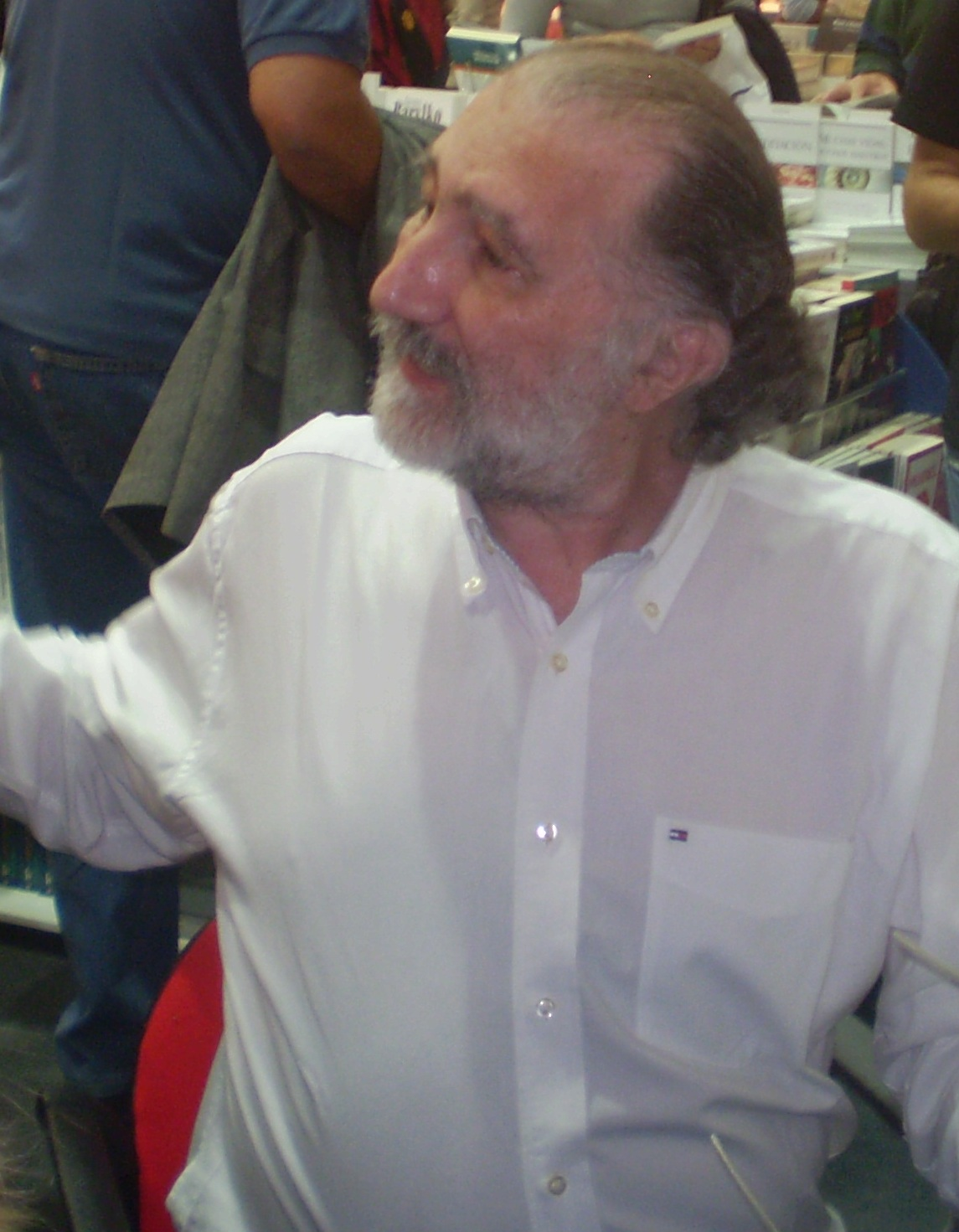
Fernando Sendra.

Fernando Javier Sendra (born 1949 in Mar del Plata, Argentina) is an Argentine cartoonist. He is mostly known as the creator of the newspaper comic series Yo, Matías ("Me, Matías"). He is the author of over 20 books, including 10 of the Yo, Matías series. He has two sons and two daughters.

He began his career as a cartoonist in 1973 working for Siete Días. Since then, he drew cartoons for several Argentine magazines, such as Para Ti, Jocker and La Semana, as well as the newspapers Tiempo Argentino and La Razón (Buenos Aires). In 1990, his strip Prudencio began to appear in the back of Clarín, the most popular daily newspaper in Argentina. In 1993, the name of this strip is changed to Yo, Matías. He has also made a strip named Clodomiro and Capitan Chacho in the 1970s. He won the Konex Award in 1992 and 2002.
