= Guillermo Divito =

José Antonio Guillermo Divito
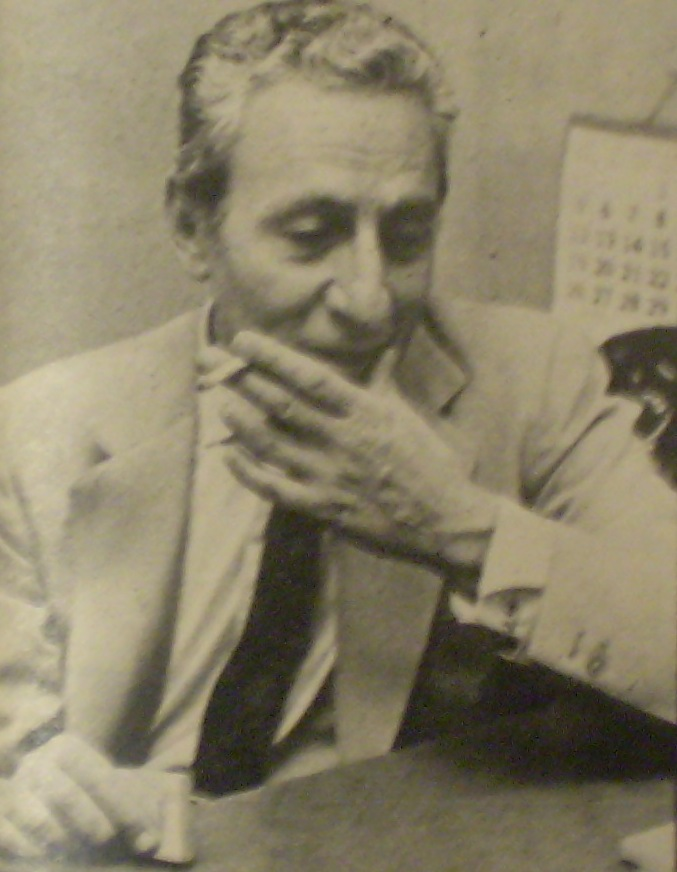
- Born: July 16, 1914; Buenos Aires, Argentina
- Died: 5 July 1969 (aged 54); Lages, Brazil
- Occupations: illustrator and cartoonist

José Antonio Guillermo Divito, also known simply as Divito (July 16, 1914 in Buenos Aires – July 5, 1969 in Lages) was an Argentine illustrator, cartoonist, caricaturist and editor who, through his comic illustrations and humor had great influence in the decades from 1940 to 1960. He was the founder and director of Rico Tipo.
