= Patoruzú =

Argentine comic character

- Patoruzú as he looks in his modern version

Publication information
- First appearance: October 19, 1928 on Crítica
- First comic appearance: Patoruzú (November 1936)
- Created by: Dante Quinterno

In-story information
- Place of origin: Buenos Aires
- Partnerships: Isidoro Cañones; Upa; La Chacha
- Abilities: Superhuman strength

Patoruzú is a comic character created in 1928 by Dante Quinterno and is considered the most popular hero of Argentine comics. Patoruzú is a wealthy Tehuelche cacique with great estate properties in Patagonia, and possesses both superhuman physical strength and a charitable yet naive heart. He was originally only a side character in Quinterno's series "Don Gil Contento", but became so popular with readers that the comic was renamed after him.

== History ==
Patoruzú's debut appearance on Crítica (October 19, 1928)

Patoruzú first appeared on October 19, 1928, in the Las Aventuras de Don Gil Contento strip in the Crítica newspaper, under the name of Curugua Curuguagüigua; last cacique of the giant Tehuelches, of whom Don Gil becomes tutor. The name was deemed too difficult to pronounce and was soon changed to Patoruzú, after the then-popular candy Pasta de Orozú. Nevertheless, the strip was canceled by the newspaper after only a few days.

Later that year Dante Quinterno started working for La Razón newspaper with the strip Don Julián de Monte Pío (predecessor of another of Quinterno's popular characters: the playboy Isidoro Cañones). In September 1930, Patoruzú was again introduced into the strip when Don Julián became his tutor. Slowly, Patoruzú assumed greater importance in the strip, which on December 11, 1931, was renamed to Patoruzú.

In 1935 Quinterno sold the publication rights to El Mundo newspaper, and the first compilation of the adventures of the cacique was published. The strip was also published in newspapers in other Argentine cities outside of Buenos Aires.

In November 1936 the first Patoruzú monthly magazine was released and completely sold out the same day. The magazine was then published fortnightly, and then weekly. The magazine reached a record circulation of 300,000 copies, soon requiring a team to create its scripts and drawings, under the supervision of Quinterno.

On April 30, 1977, the 2,045th and last issue of Patoruzú was released. Slightly adapted versions of the original have been published, as well as the comic Patoruzito, about the life of young Patoruzú.

In 1942 the 12-minute short film Upa en apuros was the first Latin-American animated film produced in colour.

The series also inspired French comics writer and artist Rene Goscinny who grew up in Argentina from 1928–1945 to create the characters Oumpah-pah in 1958, and Asterix and Obelix a year later in 1959 with artist Albert Uderzo.

== Characters ==
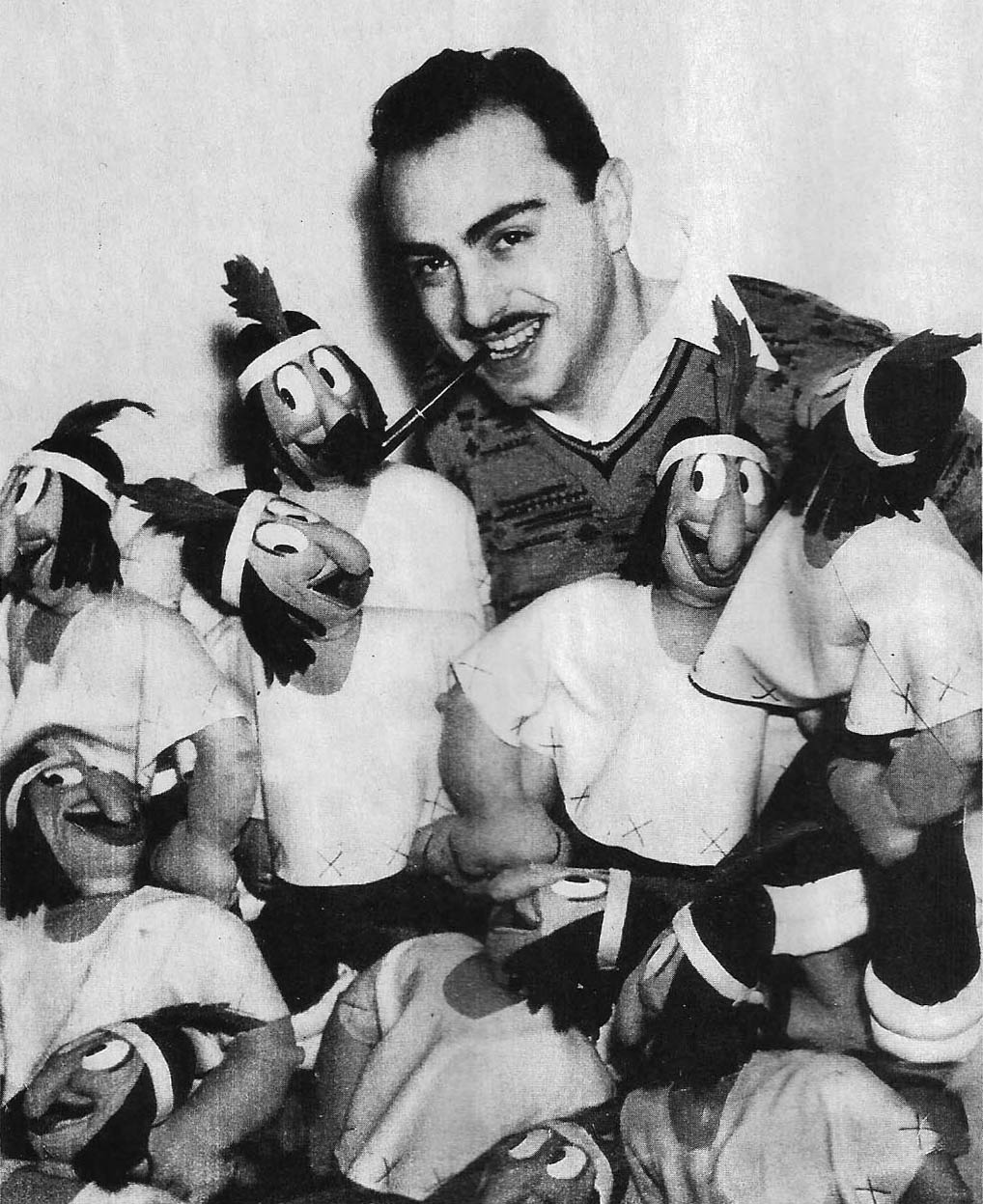
Patoruzú creator, Dante Quinterno, with several sock puppets commercialised by his own company, 1936

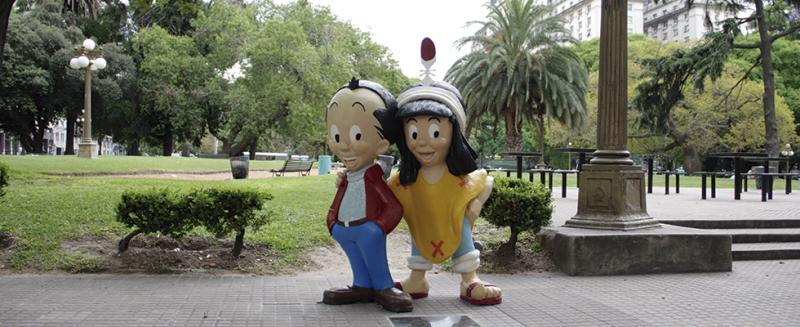
Statues of Isidorito and Patoruzito at San Telmo, Buenos Aires, 2014

Patoruzú
Patoruzú is the last descendant of the fictional Tehuelche Patoruzek dynasty. The source of his uncommon strength seems to be related to what he was fed as a child—soup made from the bones of an extinct giant animal—but also to the strength of all his ancestors, which he receives whenever he faces injustice. He is extremely generous and charitable but is often deceived by greedy characters, who in the end are always properly punished. Patoruzú uses many native expressions that give his speech an aboriginal flavor; however, they derive from different tribes of Argentina and so are not consistent with each other (e.g. Guaraní gurí, Guaraní Che, etc.).
Isidoro Cañones
An incorrigible playboy and stereotypical porteño, he is supposed to be Patoruzú's tutor and look after him, but he spends most of his time trying to find new ways of getting more patacones bills out of him, to spend on parties, cars, and horses.
Upa
Patoruzú's teenage brother is shy and naive, yet more aware of modern ways than his older brother. He has a big belly that he uses as a weapon whenever injustice is to be fought.
Patora
Patora is the youngest sister; she lives in a convent in Patagonia because her obsessive desire to get married makes her fall for the first man she sees.
La Chacha
Patoruzú's nanny and wet nurse lives on the estancia (ranch), far from any city. In spite of her age, she is vigorous and hard-working. Her empanadas are highly appreciated by the other characters.
Ñancul
The foreman of Patoruzú's estancia, he is often in a bad mood, but Patoruzú respects and trusts him.
Coronel Cañones
The Colonel, the quintessential retired military man, is the uncle and tutor of Isidoro. A very correct and respected person, he is always trying to straighten out his nephew.
Pampero
Pampero (from the Pampa and also the name of a strong southern wind, meaning in essence that he "runs like the wind") is Patoruzú's faithful horse, one of the fastest, if not the fastest, in the world. He responds only to Patoruzú's call.
Patoruzito
This modern comic is set during the early years of the life of Patoruzú, with Isidorito (young Isidoro), Patoruzito (young Patoruzú) and his horse Pamperito (young Pampero).
