= Horacio Altuna =

Argentine comic artist

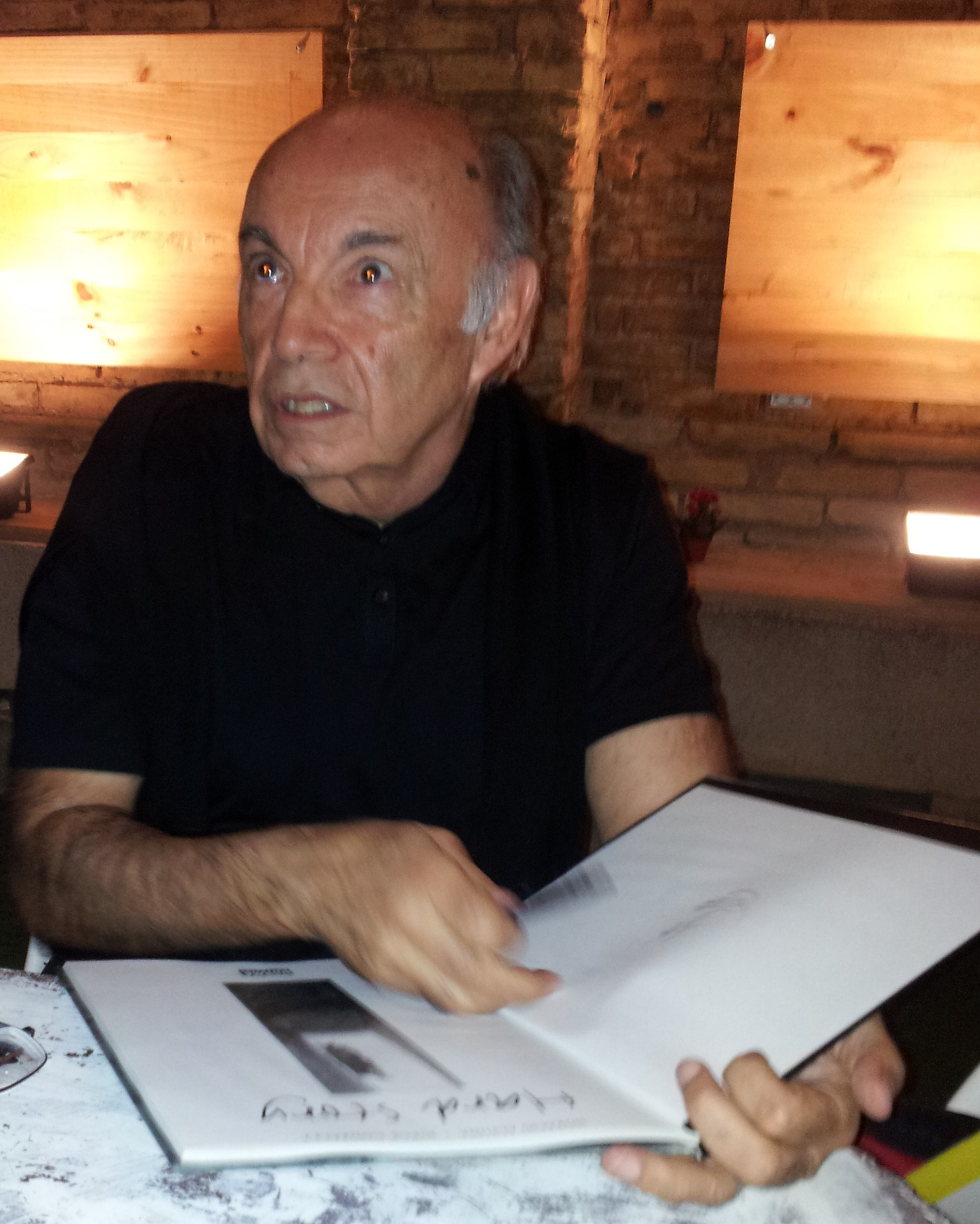
- Altuna signing books, 2014.
- Born: November 24, 1941 (age 84) Córdoba, Argentina
- Area: Comics artist
- Awards: Full list

Horacio Altuna (born November 24, 1941) is an Argentine comics artist.

== Biography ==
Altuna was born in Córdoba. He began working in the comics world in 1965 for the publisher Editorial Columba. His first characters were Titan, a Superman-like superhero, Kabul de Bengala (1971, written by Héctor Germán Oesterheld and Armando Fernández among others), Big Norman, Hilario Corvalán and others.

From 1973 to 1976, Altuna collaborated with Fleetway, Ediciones Record, Charlton Comics, Playboy and the French Les Humanoïdes Associés.

Beginning in July 1975, for the newspaper Clarín, Altuna together with writer Carlos Trillo created the character of journalist Hugo Chávez, better known as El loco Chavez (Crazy Chavez), for years one of the Argentine's most popular comics strips. Also with Trillo script, Altuna drew the series Charlie Moon and Las puertitas del señor López (Mr Lopez little doors)

In 1982, Altuna moved to Sitges in Spain, drawing stories for the Editorial Toutain and short erotic stories for Playboy. Since February 2005, has designed the comic strip Familia Tipo (Average Family) for the Spanish newspaper El Periódico.

== Awards ==
- 1986: Yellow Kid Award and Gran Guinigi prize for Best Foreign Author
- 2005: Yellow Kid Award (Rome)

== Bibliography ==
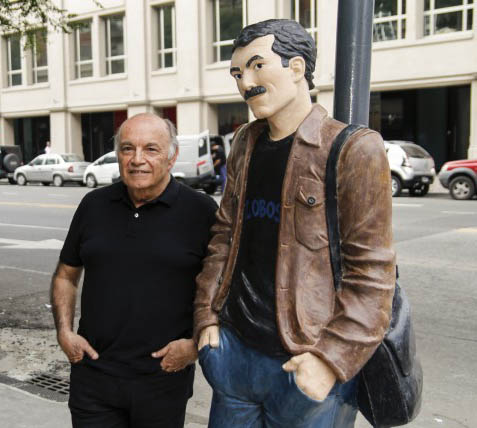
Altuna posing along with a statue of El Loco Chávez in Buenos Aires, 2015.

Altuna's work as principal author (writer/artist, except where noted) includes:

- Daily strips published in the Argentine newspaper Clarín:
  - El Loco Chávez (with writer Carlos Trillo, 1975–87)
  - El Nene Montanaro (1994–2002)
  - Es lo que Hay (Reality) (2010–present)
- Las puertitas del Sr. López, with Carlos Trillo
- Merdichesky, with Trillo
- El último recreo, with Trillo
- Tragaperras, with Trillo
- Ficcionario (1983)
- Chances (1985)
- Imaginario (1987–88)
- Time/Out (1986)
- Various cartoons for Playboy (since 1988)
- Hot L.A. (1992, 2000)
