= Inodoro Pereyra =

Argentine comic

Publication information
- First appearance: 1972
- Created by: Roberto Fontanarrosa

Inodoro Pereyra (The Renegade) is an Argentine comic strip created in 1972 by Argentine writer and cartoonist Roberto Fontanarrosa. It follows Inodoro Pereyra, a lonely Argentine gaucho living in the Argentine Pampas. The comic uses social and political satire while parodying the language and mannerisms associated with the gaucho tradition. The name "Inodoro" parodies traditional gaucho names such as "Isidoro" and "Casimiro"; however, "inodoro" also means "toilet" in Spanish.

== Publication history ==
The comic first appeared in late 1972 in the Córdoba-based humor magazine Hortensia. It was later published in Mengano before moving to Clarín in 1976 and subsequently to the newspaper's Sunday magazine Viva.

The comic was originally a parody of the language and stereotypes associated with gaucho characters in Argentine comics, including figures from works such as Santos Leiva, Lindor Covas el Cimarrón, El Huinca and Fabián Leyes. The early versions of the comic had a more elaborate visual style. In these editions, Inodoro was visited by various characters in the Argentine Pampas, while his inseparable companion Mendieta, a talking dog, participated in his adventures and commented on events.

The comic was later published in the magazines Mengano and Siete Días, where the stories were presented as episodic adventures. During this period, Mendieta developed into a co-protagonist, providing commentary and participating actively in Inodoro's adventures.

The stories of Inodoro Pereyra during this period were published as serialised adventures, often developing through extended episodes with elements of feuilleton-style suspense. Individual stories generally consisted of around 10 instalments, with each instalment usually occupying two or three pages.

At the beginning of each episode, the author included a short recap of previous events. These summaries were written in a humorous style, combining elements of radio drama, gauchesca poetry and feuilleton conventions in an ironic manner. In 1976, Inodoro settled with his partner Eulogia Tapia and Mendieta in the newspaper Clarín, where the comic was published as individual strips. The earlier focus on adventures gradually gave way to a greater emphasis on dialogue and subtle humor.

The drawing style underwent a major change after 1975. Between 1972 and 1975, the characters were depicted with thin figures, thick lines and strong contrasts. From 1976 onward, Inodoro Pereyra was drawn with a softer expression rather than the stern appearance of earlier years, while his partner "La Eulogia" changed from a stylised young woman into a larger and somewhat clumsy matron.

After appearing in different sections of the newspaper, the comic was moved to Viva, the Sunday magazine of Clarín. There, Inodoro became a calmer character, living in his humble adobe house with his wife, his dog, his pigsty and a solitary tree. The Inodoro Pereyra comics were also published in book format by Ediciones de la Flor.

Unlike many other comics, the humor in Inodoro Pereyra is not concentrated exclusively in the final panel but is usually present throughout the entire strip, especially after the comic began to be published as standalone episodes.

Most of the jokes within the strips, as well as the punchlines, are provided by Mendieta, who acts as the voice of reason in a comic built around absurd and unpredictable humor. The comic's humor is largely based on Inodoro Pereyra's distinctive language, which makes extensive use of wordplay and rhymes.

== Characters ==
=== Inodoro Pereyra ===
He is a parody of the stereotypical Argentine gaucho of the Pampas, inspired by Martín Fierro, the protagonist of the eponymous gaucho epic poem. He reflects on life in solitude, accompanied by his dog Mendieta, and welcomes visitors to his home, offering them peculiar advice. The humor of the comic is largely based on Inodoro's language, with extensive use of wordplay and puns.

=== Mendieta ===
He is a small, friendly dog of an unknown breed who can speak. He shares Inodoro's adventures, contributing to his reflections and acting as Pereyra's confidant. In fact, Mendieta was the seventh male child of a family and was born on a full moon night; legend says that he should have been transformed into a werewolf, but because that night there was a lunar eclipse, he instead became a dog with the power of speech.

=== Eulogia Tapia ===
In the first Inodoro Pereyra comic in 1972 she appears as the young bride of the gaucho. She was drawn as a young and slim woman with beautiful facial features (even within the cartoonish aesthetics of the drawings). She later started being drawn as an overweight woman from 1976, increasing her weight by 25 kg in a single frame. She is home-loving, has a bad temper and is jealous to the point of becoming angry like a beast when Inodoro is late.

=== The parrots ===
Through the years, these are the quintessential enemies of Inodoro. They move around as a flock, teasing and making fun of him. While they generate various problems and harm, sometimes they help him, making the gaucho a bit confused. From among the flock of parrots, Lorenzo stands out.

=== The ranqueles ===
These are wild Indians (natives) that from time to time visit Inodoro's house, either asking for advice or threatening him. Their leader is Chief Crybaby (in Argentine Spanish as Lloriqueo).

=== Nabucodonosor II ===
A talking vegetarian pig, he believes that he is a sex symbol, as he is the only male among several female pigs. He won 1st place in a local fair, and thinks that he is a philosopher and an intellectual.

=== The Scorpion Resolana ===
He is the bravest gaucho in the area. On one occasion he fought with Inodoro Pereyra because he offended Eulogia, Inodoro's wife.
