= Roberto Fontanarrosa =

Argentine cartoonist (1944-2007)

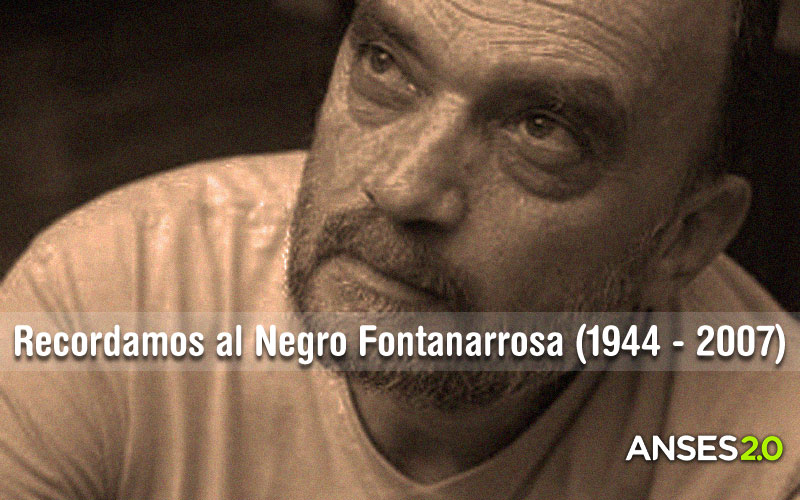
- Born: Roberto Alfredo Fontanarrosa; November 26, 1944; Rosario, Santa Fe, Argentina
- Died: July 19, 2007 (aged 62); Rosario, Santa Fe, Argentina
- Other name: El Negro ("The Black One"/"Black man")
- Years active: 1968 — 2007

Roberto Alfredo Fontanarrosa (November 26, 1944 – July 19, 2007), popularly known as El Negro Fontanarrosa, was an Argentine cartoonist, comics artist and writer. During his extended career, Fontanarrosa became one of the most acclaimed historieta artists of his country, as well as a respected fiction and short story writer. He created two hugely popular comic strips, as well as their parodic protagonists: Inodoro Pereyra, a gaucho, and Boogie, el aceitoso, a gun-for-hire. He also created the comic book Los Clásicos según Fontanarrosa ("The Classics According to Fontanarrosa"), which contained a selection of humorous parodies of universal literature mainstays originally published in the magazine Chaupinela, in the 1970s.

In 2013 an Argentine animated film directed by Juan José Campanella and loosely based on Fontanarrosa's short story "Memorias de un wing derecho" was released to box office success.

== Biography ==
=== Early life ===
Fontanarrosa was born in Rosario, province of Santa Fe, and he lived and worked there until his death. He was widely known by the affectionate nickname El Negro.

=== Career ===
"People would say that I'm a comic writer, at most, and that will be true. I don't care too much how people will define me as a writer. I don't want to be a Nobel laureate. It will be enough for me if anyone tells me 'I laughed my ass off with your book.'"

Fontanarrosa began his career writing and drawing comic strips and later branched out into writing narratives with short stories, especially about football (soccer). His most famous strips are Inodoro Pereyra, featuring a gaucho and his talking dog Mendieta, and the hitman Boogie el Aceitoso, which came to life as a Dirty Harry parody.

Simultaneously with his comic book career, Fontanarrosa went on to write three novels (Best Seller, El área 18 and La Gansada) and seven books of short stories (Los trenes matan a los autos, El mundo ha vivido equivocado, No sé si he sido claro, Nada del otro mundo, El mayor de mis defectos, Uno nunca sabe and La mesa de los galanes), all of them filled with a combination of subtle and broad humor. There are also a number of book compilations of his newspapers' strips.

His work has been seen in different Latin American newspapers including Argentine Clarín, Colombian El tiempo, Uruguayan La República, and Mexican magazine Proceso. In 1977 he was approached by Les Luthiers (the famous Argentine humour/music group), who wanted him to collaborate on a script they were writing for a film starring the six group members; the film never bore fruit, but he instead became a creative partner, often writing jokes and situations for them, and most of their shows from 1979 onwards feature his input alongside Les Luthiers'.

He was granted the Platinum Konex Award in 1994, and the Konex Merit Diploma in 1992, 2004 and 2012 (posthumous).

In November 2007, a posthumous work of Fontanarrosa was made public: the animated film Fierro was released, for which he had co-written the script and designed all the characters shortly before his death.

=== Illness ===
In 2003 he was diagnosed with amyotrophic lateral sclerosis and was reliant on a wheelchair. He continued to work, and participated in the meetings of the Third International Congress of the Spanish Language, in 2004, where he gave a humorous lecture about taboo words and the final speech. On 26 April 2006, the Senate awarded him the Domingo Faustino Sarmiento Mention of Honour for his career and his contribution to Argentine culture.

On January 18, 2007, he announced that he would be no longer drawing his own strips because he had lost full control of his hand, but stated that he would go on writing the scripts for his characters.

=== Death ===
On 19 July 2007, Fontanarrosa suffered a respiratory failure, and was taken to a hospital. He died there about one hour later. His funeral service and the funeral procession on the next day were attended by thousands of common citizens, writers, actors, and political authorities. The procession stopped beside the Gigante de Arroyito stadium (home of Rosario Central, a team of which Fontanarrosa was possibly its most notable fan) and then continued north to the neighbouring city of Granadero Baigorria, where Fontanarrosa was buried at the Parque de la Eternidad cemetery.

The main national news services and printed media of Argentina devoted special segments to Fontanarrosa's legacy and the funeral service. The national government declared a Mourning Day for National Culture, and the municipal government of Rosario ordered flags to be flown at half mast.
