= Dante Quinterno =

Argentine comics artist (1909–2003)

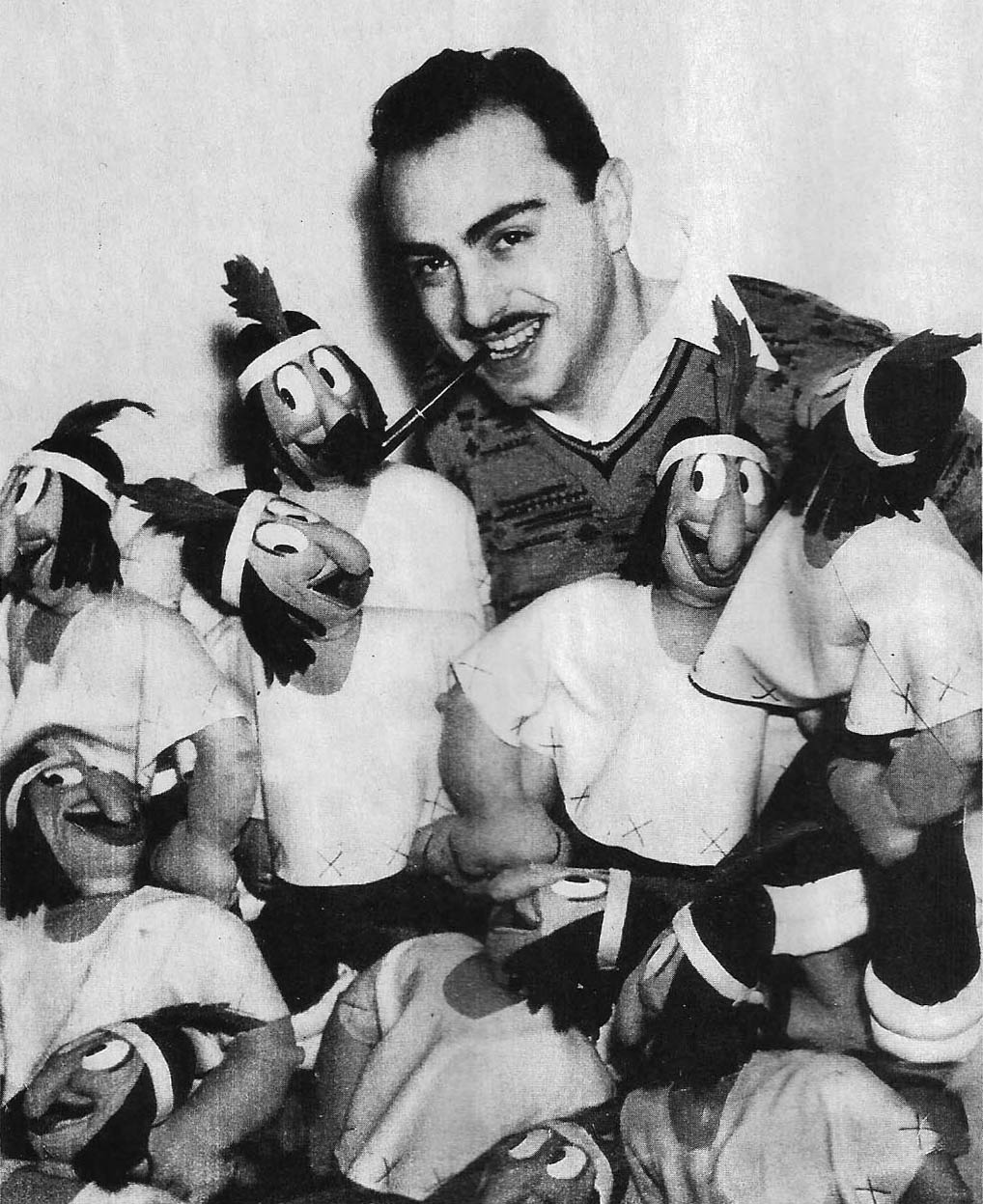
- Quinterno in 1936 with Patoruzú puppets
- Born: October 26, 1909 Buenos Aires, Argentina
- Died: May 14, 2003 (aged 93) Buenos Aires, Argentina
- Areas: artist, editorial businessman, agricultural producer.
- Notable works: Patoruzú 'Patoruzito, Isidoro Cañones'

Dante Quinterno (Buenos Aires, October 26, 1909 – Buenos Aires, May 14, 2003) was an Argentine comics artist, agricultural producer, and prolific editorial businessman, famous for being the creator of the Patoruzú, Isidoro Cañones and Patoruzito characters.

He was born in Buenos Aires, on October 26, 1909, son of Martín Quinterno and Laura Raffo. His paternal grandfather was originally from Piamonte, and emigrated to Argentina to be an Agricultural producer and a fruit seller.

In 1924 he began sending his drawings to several Buenos Aires newspapers and in 1925 he published his first comic Panitruco, in El Suplemento. Later on he wrote Andanzas y desventuras de Manolo Quaranta (1926); Don Fermín (later renamed Don Fierro, 1926), and Un porteño optimista (later named Las aventuras de Don Gil Contento, 1927), for different newspapers. In the latter he introduced in 1928 a new character Curugua-Curuguagüigua, which was later renamed Patoruzú. Along with Patoruzú came other supporting characters as Isidoro Cañones and the young Patoruzú (Patoruzito), which later on became their own main character in their own publications. Since 1936, Patoruzú became an independent publication, which at its zenith sold 300,000 copies. In that same year, he founded Dante Quinterno Publishing (Editorial Dante Quinterno). Other books followed: "Libro de Oro de Patoruzú" (1937, annual comic book), Dinamica Rural" (1950, agricultural magazine),"Pepín Cascarón(1960), Patoruzito (1945, with the collaboration of Eduardo Ferro, José Luis Salinas and Alberto Breccia), Andanzas de Patoruzú (1956), Correrías de Patoruzito (1958) and Locuras de Isidoro (1968).

Quinterno also started a career as an animator, and on November 20, 1942 opened a 15-minute animated colour short, Upa en apuros at the Ambassador cinema in Buenos Aires. At the 1943 Argentine Film Critics Association Awards, Quinterno won the Special Prize for this film.

In the 1990s he moved away from the comics world, becoming a businessman, but he continue exploiting his characters with his own publishing and licensee companies; Editorial Universo S.A. and Los Tehuelches S.A.. Married Rosa Schiaffino in 1938, they had three children: Dante, Walter and Mónica. He died in Buenos Aires on May 14, 2003, and is buried at La Recoleta Cemetery.
