= Oscar Conti =

Argentine artist

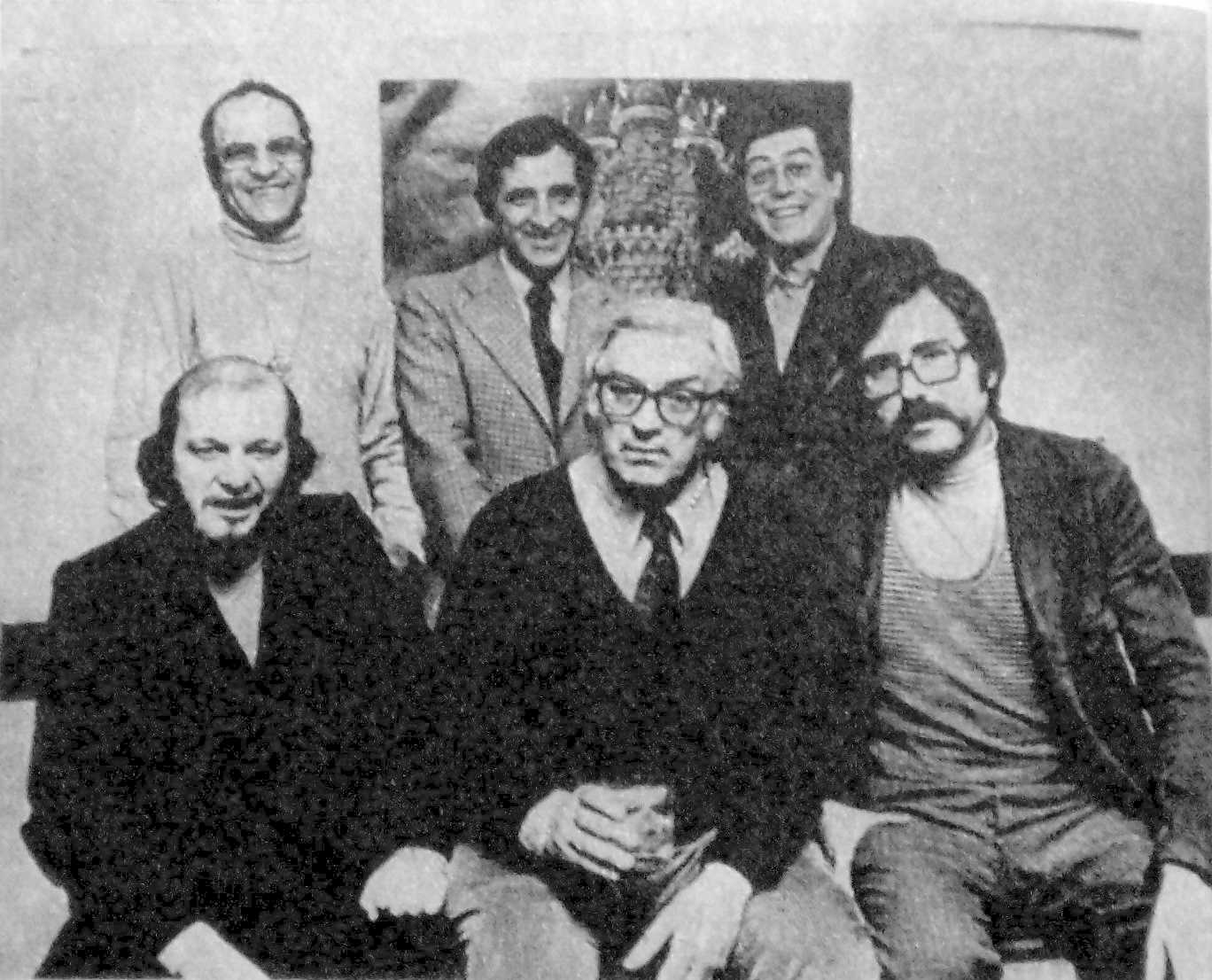
Oski (front and center) poses with fellow Argentine caricaturists of renown in 1979.

Oscar "Oski" Conti (1914 – 30 October 1979) was a prominent Argentine cartoonist and humorist.

== Life and work ==
Oscar Esteban Conti was born in Buenos Aires in 1914. Enrolling at the National Fine Arts School, he helped finance his studies by creating caricatures for local advertisers. Following graduation, he studied scenography at the Buenos Aires Academy for Higher Studies.

Despite his distaste for the medium, Conti was hired by Cascabel magazine as a cartoonist in 1942; at Cascabel, he first began signing his work as "Oski." Creating his only comic strip character, "Amarroto" (loosely translated as "Miser") for Rico Tipo in 1944 (one of the best-selling satirical weeklies in Argentina at the time), he was enlisted by humorist Carlos Warnes ("César Bruto") to illustrate his irreverent Versos y noticias, a weekly satire of current events in which photos of the news were replaced by Oski's mocking caricatures. His work was in growing demand during subsequent years, and his elongated human characters and featherless birds fixtures in a number of popular mainstream magazines and in Clarín, the most-widely circulated news daily in Argentina and Latin America.

His work brought him to the attention of French writer Jean-Paul Sartre, who had Oski create the backdrop for the Buenos Aires performance of his play, The Polite Prostitute in 1947. Irish writer George Bernard Shaw also turned to him for the Argentine premiere of his play, Androcles and the Lion, which played in 1953. Oski had an anthology of his work published in 1952, as well as an animated film, The First Foundation of Buenos Aires, in 1959. Made in an era in which such historical events were treated as sacrosanct epics by the State and much of the media, First Foundation was a slapstick look at the imposing Spanish Conquistadores and their conflict with retaliating indigenous peoples. A similar theme prevailed is his satirical comic book, The True History of the Indies, in 1968. He also illustrated unconventional editions of Argentine literary epics, such a University of Buenos Aires edition of Estanislao del Campo's Fausto (an adaptation of the traditional tale - with a gaucho as the protagonist). Sought internationally, he relocated to Santiago, Chile in 1970, partly out of support for President Salvador Allende. There, he illustrated Cabrochico Magazine until returning to Argentina in 1972.

Oski contributed to the left-wing Satiricón magazine in Buenos Aires. He illustrated the best-selling True History of Sports in 1973 and published another anthology, Oski in His Own Ink. Satiricón's closure by executive order in 1974, however, led Oski to begin eschewing political subject matter, instead working with César Bruto in The Brutoski Medicinal Handbook (a would-be Medical school textbook) and their unique version of the seminal Salerno School of Medicine's medieval compendium.

The worsening climate of political violence and repression in Argentina during 1975 led Oski to move to Barcelona, Spain late that year, where he briefly worked for Lumen Publishing. Relocating to Rome in 1976, he illustrated a number of left-leaning periodicals such as Italy's L'Unità, though his declining health and a certain loosening of restrictions by Argentina's dictatorship in 1979 led him to return. Contributing a segment in a public television mockumentary of the 1978 FIFA World Cup (won by Argentina), Oski died on October 30, 1979, at 65. Numerous posthumous anthologies of his work have been published since, notably El Maestroski in 1989.
