= 1957 in comics =

Notable events of 1957 in comics.

== Publications and events ==
=== January ===
- January 7:
  - Mort Walker and Frank Roberge's Mrs. Fitz's Flats makes its debut. It will run until 1972.
  - Belgian cartoonist Pil publishes the first gag of his long-running comic series Meneerke Peeters, which will run until 1983.
- Four Color Comics #762 (Dell Comics) — cover-titled "The Sharkfighters." The 34-page story, by an unknown writer, was penciled and inked by John Buscema.
- First issue of the monthly magazine Almanacco di Topolino (Mickey Mouse almanac), edited by Mondadori.

=== February ===
- February 2: André Franquin's Gaston Lagaffe makes his debut in Spirou. He first appears in its pages without any explanation. After a few weeks Spirou finally asks him who he is, but only finds out his name. Gaston then evolves into its own gag comic, which will run until 1997.
- February 4: Mell Lazarus' Miss Peach makes its debut. It will run until 8 September 2002.
- February 10: Leonard Starr's Mary Perkins, On Stage makes its debut.
- The final issue of the Dutch comics magazine Ketelbinkie Krant is published, which is named Kapitein Rob's Vrienden outside Rotterdam.
- In Showcase, the Challengers of the Unknown make their debut.

=== March ===
- March 1: La traccia nel deserto,by Aurelio Galeppini and Gian Luigi Bonelli; the Pinkerton agent Mac Parland, recurring character in the Tex Willer series, makes his debut.
- March 10: In the Italian Disney comics magazine Topolino the story The quest for Tarzan, by Romano Scarpa first appears in print, which marks the only appearance of the jungle man Gaffy, brother of Goofy.
- March 25: In Topolino the Donald Duck story Donald Duck and the Count of Monte Cristo by Guido Martina and Luciano Bottaro first appears in print. It's a parody of the eponymous Alexandre Dumas novel. The same year Martina also creates parodies of The Three Musketeers and Tartarin of Tarascon, always with Donald Duck as protagonist.
- March 28: The first issue of the Italian comics magazine Il Giorno dei Ragazzi is published. In the first issue Benito Jacovitti's Cocco Bill makes its debut.

=== April ===
- April 18: In Spirou the Lucky Luke story The Dalton Cousins, by René Goscinny and Morris starts off, which brings back The Daltons, recurring adversaries of Lucky Luke. The lonesome cowboy had already faced the historical Dalton gang in Hors-la-loi (1951), but murdered them. By bringing their identical cousins back into the stories Morris could keep using these characters. In the same issue of the magazine, first chapter of Le Voyageur du Mésozoïque, by Franquin.
- In the Argentine magazine Frontera the first episode of Ticonderoga, by Héctor G. Oesterheld and Hugo Pratt kicks off, a serial set in the French and Indian war.

=== May ===
- May 8: Maurice Maréchal's Prudence Petitpas makes her debut in Tintin.
- Héctor Germán Oesterheld and Hugo Pratt's Ernie Pike makes its debut on the first issue of the magazine Hora Cero

=== June ===
- June 2: The final episode of Barbara Shermund's cartoon feature Shermund's Sallies is published, which will run in Pictorial Review until 2 June 1957.
- June 12: Jean Graton's Michel Vaillant makes its debut in Tintin.
- June 15: The first issue of Collana Audace rolls from the presses (Edizioni Audace), featuring the adventures of the Indian hero Kociss.
- American News Company goes out of business, causing a huge shakeup in the publishing industry, forcing many comic book publishers and small magazine publishers out of business. Atlas Comics is forced to switch distribution to Independent News, owned by National Periodical Publications, owner of Atlas' rival, DC Comics. Because of this, Atlas is constrained as to its publishing output for the next decade (including the early years of its successor, Marvel Comics).
- Land of the Pygmy Indians, by Carl Barks, on Uncle Scrooge.
- Frank Jacobs's first article is printed in Mad Magazine. He'll become their longest-running scriptwriter, publishing his final article in October 2014.

=== July ===
- The Donald Duck. story Forbidden Valley by Carl Barks first appears in print.
- In Italy the first issue of Soldino (Bianconi) rolls from the press, starring the adventures (written by Giovan Battista Carpi) of the baby king Soldino and his tutor Nonna Abelarda.

=== August ===
- August 3: The final episode of Stephen Dowling and Frank Dowling's Ruggles is published.
- August 5:
  - Reg Smythe's Andy Capp makes its debut.
  - The first episode of Jack Dunkley's The Larks is printed. The series will run until 1985.
  - Pat l’irlandese (Pat the Irishman), by Aurelio Galeppini and Gian Luigi Bonelli is first published, which marks the debut of the Irish boxer Pat Mac Ryan, who becomes a helper of Tex Willer.
- The first issue of Harvey Kurtzman's humor magazine Humbug is published. It will run until 1958.
- Showcase #9, Lois Lane is featured in a tryout for her own series.
- Marvel Tales (vol. 1), with issue #159, canceled by Timely.
- Western Kid, with issue #17, canceled by Atlas.
- The Uncle Scrooge story Uncle Scrooge Goes to Disneyland with Carl Barks' The Fantastic River Race is launched.

=== September ===
- September 4: Héctor Germán Oesterheld and Francisco Solano López' Il Eternauta (The Eternaut) makes its debut.
- September 9: Abel Santa Cruz and Alberto Breccia's Pancho López makes its debut.
- September 10: Marten Toonder's Tom Poes story De Kiekvogel is first published. Halfway the story Anne-Marie Doddel, Olivier B. Bommel's love interest, makes her debut.
- September 14: The final episode of Stanley Link's newspaper comic The Dailys is first published.
- September 19: Donald the milkman by Carl Barks is refused by Western Printing, because judged too violent; the story will be published only in 1974 in a Dutch magazine.
- Wild Western, with issue #57, canceled by Atlas.
- Ringo Kid, with issue #21, canceled by Atlas.
- Outlaw Kid, with issue #19, canceled by Atlas.
- Rawhide Kid, with issue #17, canceled by Atlas. (The title would be revived three years later by Marvel, continuing the numbering.)
- The Uncle Scrooge story The Mines of King Solomon first appears in print.

=== October ===
- October 10: In the Italian Disney magazine Topolino The Return of Snow White and the Seven Dwarfs by Romano Scarpa, with Jiminy Cricket as guest star s first published.
- October 16: Dino Attanasio's Signor Spaghetti makes its debut in Tintin.
- October 21: Marc Sleen's The Adventures of Nero story De Granaatslikker is first published in the newspapers. Halfway the story Abraham Tuizentfloot makes his debut.
- October 24: Benito Jacovitti's character, the journalist Tom Ficcanaso (Nosy Tom), makes his debut in Il giorno dei ragazzi.
- October 28: Charles M. Schulz' It's Only a Game makes its debut and will run until 11 January 1959.
- The first issue of Hot Stuff the Little Devil, created by Warren Kremer and first published in Hot Stuff is published.
- The first issue of the magazine Bunny is published in Italy, which introduces the Looney Tunes comics in the country.

=== November ===
- November 3: The first episode of It's Only a Game is published. Originally drawn by Charles M. Schulz, later by Jim Sasseville, it will run until 1959.
- November 7: in Spirou, first chapter of Le juge, by Goscinny and Morris.
- November 10: In the Italian Disney comics magazine Topolino, The Flying Scott by Romano Scarpa is first published.
- November 19: The first issue of the Belgian comics magazine Samedi-Jeunesse is published, which will run until November 1976.
- November 27 : in Spirou, first chapter of Vacances sans histoire by Andrè Franquin.
- November 28: The first episode of Hergé's Adventures of Tintin airs on television by Ray Goossens and animation studio Belvision. This is the first hand-drawn animated TV adaptation of the comics series The Adventures of Tintin.
- Sagmore Springs Hotel, by Carl Barks appears in Walt Disney's Comics and Stories

=== December ===
- December 24: André Franquin creates the Christmas comic Le Petit Noël in Spirou.
- December 28: The final issue of the British Disney comics weekly Mickey Mouse Weekly is published.
- In Italy, the first issue of I classici di Walt Disney (Walt Disney's Classics, Mondadori) is published, a reprint of the best stories which appeared earlier in the magazines Topolino, and Tom & Jerry (Bunny).

=== Specific date unknown ===
- Al Jaffee's Tall Tales makes its debut.
- Pál Pusztai's Jucika makes its debut and will run until his death in 1970.

== Births ==
=== January ===
- January 17: Ann Nocenti, American comic book writer and editor (DC Comics, Marvel Comics).
- January 27: Frank Miller, American comic book writer (Daredevil, The Dark Knight Returns).

=== March ===
- March 14: Mike DeCarlo, American comic book artist (Batman, Legion of Super-Heroes, Looney Tunes).

=== July ===
- July 10: Gerard Jones, American comic book writer (Green Lantern, Justice League, Wonder Man).

=== August ===
- August 21: Tignous, French cartoonist (Charlie Hebdo) (d. 2015)

== Deaths ==
=== January ===
- January 5: Clarence Gray, American comics artist (Brick Bradford), dies at age 56.
- January 25: Harry J. Tuthill, American comics artist (The Bungle Family), dies at age 71.

=== February ===
- February 5: Ben Hardaway, American animator (Looney Tunes, namegiver of Bugs Bunny), dies at age 61.

=== March ===
- March 1: A.C. Hutchison, American comics artist and animator (Major Sunshine and Colonel Grouch, Mrs. Economy, Luke Whoozis), dies at age 72.
- March 20: Arthur Lewis, American comics artist (continued Nervy Nat), dies at age 84.
- March 25: Ed Smalle, Canadian-American comics artist (Récit Authentiques, comics for Chesler Comics and Funnies Inc.), dies at age 45.
- March 28: Jack Butler Yeats, Irish painter, illustrator and comics artist. (Chubb-Lock Holmes), dies at age 85.

=== April ===
- April 17: Juan Martinez Buendia, aka Tínez, Spanish comics artist (contributed to TBO, Los Grandes Inventos de TBO), dies at age 64 or 65.
- April 23: Guido Fantoni, Italian comics artist (Cartouche, made Italian versions of The Phantom, Mandrake the Magician and Flash Gordon), dies at age 64.
- April 30: Jacques Souriau, French comics artist (Jean et Jeanette), dies at age 80.

=== May ===
- May 10: Henry C. Kiefer, American comics artist (drew realistically drawn adaptations of literary classics for Fiction House and Classics Illustrated), dies at age 67.

=== June ===
- June 6: Andrew A. Munch, American comics artist (continued Mac), dies at age 48.
- June 17: J.R. Williams, Canadian comics artist (Out Our Way), dies at age 69.

=== July ===
- July 16: Louis Biedermann, American illustrator (the comics characters cross-over book All The Funny Folks), dies at age 82.

=== September ===
- September 7: Jan Lutz, Dutch illustrator and comics artist, dies at age 69.
- September 15: Jos Verdegem, Belgian painter, illustrator and comics artist, dies at age 60.
- September 24: Harry Paschall, American bodybuilder, columnist and comics artist (Bosco), dies at age 60.

=== October ===
- October 11: Edmond François Calvo, French comics artist (La Bête est Mort), dies at age 65.
- October 14: Reginald Heade, British comics artist (worked for magazines like Knockout and Comet), dies at age 55 or 56.
- October 26: Lawson Wood, British painter, illustrator, designer and comics artist (Gran'pop), dies at age 79.

=== December ===
- December 14: Josef Lada, Czech painter, illustrator, comics artist and writer (Mikeš the cat, The Good Soldier Švejk), dies at age 69.
- December 22: Robert Zuppke, American football coach and comics writer (Ned Brant), dies at age 78.
- December 23: Maurice Cuvillier, French comics artist and illustrator (Zimbo et Zimba, Perlin et Pinpin, Sylvain et Sylvette), dies at age 60.
- December 24: Stanley Link, American comics artist (Tiny Tim, Ching Chow, The Dailys), dies at age 62 or 63.

=== Specific date unknown ===
- Ad Carter, American comics artist (Our Friend Mush, Just Kids, Nicodemus O'Malley), dies at age 71 or 72.

== First issues by title ==
=== Charlton Comics ===
- Billy the Kid (November)

=== Marvel Comics ===
- Adventures of Homer Ghost (June)
- The Black Rider Rides Again (September)
- Commando Adventures (June)
- A Date with Patsy (September)
- Hedy Wolfe (August)
- The Kid from Dodge City (July)
- The Kid from Texas (June)
- Marvin Mouse (September)
- Navy Tales (January)
- Nellie the Nurse
- Showgirls (June)
- Six-Gun Western (January)
- Western Trails (May)
- Willie the Wise Guy

=== Renamed titles ===
==== Marvel Comics ====
- Dexter the Demon #7 — renamed from Melvin the Monster
- G.I. Tales #4 — renamed from Sgt. Barney Barker
- Marines at War #1-8 — renamed from Tales of the Marines (Atlas Comics)
- Kid Slade, Gunfighter #5 — renamed from Matt Slade, Gunfighter
- Navy Action #15 — renamed from Sailor Sweeney
- Sherry the Showgirl #5 — renamed from Showgirls
- Showgirls #4 renamed from Sherry the Showgirl
- Tales of the Marines #4 — renamed Marines at War, renamed from Devil-Dog Dugan (Atlas Comics)

== Initial appearance by character name ==
- Billy the Kid — Masked Raider #6 (Charlton, February)
- Captain Cold in Showcase #8 (June), created by John Broome and Carmine Infantino - DC Comics
- Challengers of the Unknown in Showcase #6 (February), created by Jack Kirby - DC Comics
- Professor Milo in Detective Comics #247 (September), created by Bill Finger and Sheldon Moldoff - DC Comics
- Professor Potter — Superman's Pal, Jimmy Olsen #22 (DC, August)
- Signalman in Batman #112 (December), created by Bill Finger and Sheldon Moldoff - DC Comics
- Ralph Kendall, by Héctor G. Oesterheld and Arturo del Castillo.

== See also ==
- 1956 in comics
- other events of 1957
- 1958 in comics
- 1950s in comics
- list of years in comics
