= El Eternauta: segunda parte =

Argentine comic book

- Cover of the book by Ediciones Record
- Author(s): Héctor Germán Oesterheld
- Illustrator(s): Francisco Solano López
- Current status/schedule: Concluded
- Launch date: December 1976
- End date: April 1978
- Publisher(s): Ediciones Record
- Genre(s): Post-apocalyptic
- Original language: Spanish
- Preceded by: The Eternaut 1969
- Followed by: El Eternauta: tercera parte

El Eternauta, segunda parte (Spanish for "The Eternaut, second part") is a 1975 Argentine comic by Héctor Germán Oesterheld and Francisco Solano López. A sequel to The Eternaut, it was written during the Dirty War. Oesterheld, a member of the Montoneros guerrilla at the time, was a victim of an enforced disappearance while writing the story.

== Publication history ==
The Eternaut was a comic strip by Héctor Germán Oesterheld and Francisco Solano López between 1957 and 1959. It was published by Editorial Frontera. Frontera went bankrupt shortly afterwards, Solano López left for Europe, and Oesterheld sold the publication rights of the comic to pay debts. Oesterheld made a reboot of the comic with Alberto Breccia, The Eternaut 1969, which was canceled by the publisher but became a hit in Europe. After several successive sales, the rights for The Eternaut were acquired by Ediciones Record. The first story was republished, and became a huge success. This was followed by a sequel, that started being published in the anthology comic Libro de Oro Skorpio #2, with the same creative team as the original version. Solano López had returned from Europe a short time before, seeking to retrieve his original artworks of the series. By this time, amid the Cold War, Oesterheld had joined the Montoneros guerrilla, which sought to establish a communist regime in the country akin to Fidel Castro's Cuba, and who were opposed by the National Reorganization Process, a military regime that preferred to be aligned with the United States in the international conflict. As a result, Oesterheld had become clandestine, staying at hidden locations and delivering the plots for the comic in surreptitious ways. Solano López was not comfortable with the situation, as he felt that the story was being used to deliver open left-wing propaganda, but he could never meet Oesterheld in person to discuss about it. He said that "All the work on the second part was done clandestinely. And I protested, because he went too far in terms of militant and subversive content. I had no sympathy for the military or their system, but the message of the Montoneros was not to my liking either. And the character was distorted. I did not feel it. It bothered me to do it, because the character, according to the script, moved, did and said things that did not fit."

The final episode was released in April 1978. Oesterheld was the victim of an enforced disappearance a year before that, in the city of La Plata. According to reports from survivors, he was detained at El Vesubio. The story concluded its publication without problems, but Solano López has doubts over the real authorship of the last plots. In addition to the circumstances mentioned, the plots were typewritten instead of handwritten as they used to be, and the sequence with the flying people felt even more out-of-character than before.

== Plot ==
The story continues right after the ending of The Eternaut. Oesterheld, who prefers to be called just "Germán", can not accept that Juan Salvo forgot everything, so he storms into his house to try to remind him of what had happened. Germán himself forgets everything, and joins the others to a game of truco. Suddenly, as they regain their memories all the city around the house disappears, replaced by barren countryside. Salvo's friends disappear as well, with only his wife and daughter, Elena and Martita, remaining. Salvo and Germán leave at dawn to try to find supplies, but find nothing. The house is destroyed by a Gurbo, but Elena and Martita managed to escape, and Salvo and Germán follow them to a small group of cavemen. It turns out that they are in the far future, and those cavemen are descendants of the survivors of the original invasion. "They" established their headquarters in a far-away fortress. A Hand shows up and orders the cavemen to surrender all the children in a couple of weeks; "they" are planning to use them as fuel to leave Earth and return to their planet. Salvo proposes instead to start a resistance: with the telephone directory and the map of the city he'd had at home they locate buried basements and prepare weapons and explosives.

Salvo then organizes a small team to sneak into the enemy fortress and sabotage it from within. It turned out that there was a disagreement between the aliens over the cavemen, and a good alien used their time machines to displace Salvo, with house and all, into that era so that he could help them. Although that alien was killed by the others, Salvo and Germán activate the self-destruction of the fortress and rush to help the cavemen, who were attacked during the infiltration. Elena and Martita die during the attack, and Salvo and Germán suddenly return to their era a few days later.
