= El Eternauta: tercera parte =

Argentine-Italian comic book

- Cover of the book by Ediciones Record
- Author: Alberto Ongaro
- Illustrator: Oswal
- Current status/schedule: Concluded
- Launch date: 1981
- Publisher: Ediciones Record
- Genre: Science fiction
- Original language: Spanish
- Preceded by: El Eternauta: segunda parte

El Eternauta: tercera parte is the second sequel of the Argentine comic The Eternaut, created by Héctor Germán Oesterheld and drawn by Francisco Solano López in 1957. The first sequel, El Eternauta: segunda parte, had been published a few years before it, and Oesterheld was subjected to an enforced disappearance shortly afterwards. El Eternauta: tercera parte, published in 1981, is the first comic about the character that is not written by Oesterheld, and Solano López refused any involvement with it. It was written instead by Alberto Ongaro, with illustrations by Oswal, Mario Morhain, and Carlos Meglia.

== Plot ==
Following their return to the present, Juan Salvo remains grief-stricken over the apparent loss of his wife Elena and daughter Martita. However, he begins to experience visions of unfamiliar locations, eventually discovering that these are not hallucinations but glimpses into a parallel dimension. This alternate reality was inadvertently created by atomic explosions, which opened a dimensional portal.

Salvo and his companion Germán travel through the portal and find counterparts of themselves, Elena, and Martita in this mirror universe. The neighborhood in this world has been overrun by an army of robotic enforcers. The two men learn that the invasion was orchestrated by a group known as the "Condors" — individuals from a future civilization approximately a thousand years ahead, whose spacecraft was accidentally transported to the 1980s via the portal. The Condors are led by Prince Condor, who refuses to return to his time and instead seeks to use the 1980s as a refuge in his conflict against his own government. To solidify his hold, he requires access to the portal's location.

During their escape from the Condors, Salvo and Germán encounter their alternate-universe counterparts, who have formed a resistance movement. In a confrontation, the alternate versions of Salvo and Germán sacrifice themselves in an attempt to thwart the Condors, but are killed in the process.

Believing they are no longer pursued, the primary Salvo and Germán travel into the future via the portal. There, they meet Germán O., a descendant of Germán and a member of the ruling council. They uncover that one of the original "Hands" — alien beings from a prior invasion — had been displaced into the future. Styling himself "The Great Magician," this Hand had manipulated two genetically altered children, Cóndor and Alma, to lead an army intended to subjugate Earth. After falling into the past through the portal, their presence went unnoticed by both the Hand and the authorities, who assumed them dead.

Salvo manages to defeat the Hand and retrieve a kill-switch device implanted in the children. Upon returning to the 1980s, Salvo and Germán eliminate Prince Condor and Alma, destroying the spacecraft and ending the threat.

== Editorial history ==
The Eternaut was a comic strip written between 1957 and 1959 by Héctor Germán Oesterheld and Francisco Solano López. They made a sequel, El Eternauta: segunda parte between 1976 and 1978. By that time, Oesterheld had joined the Montoneros and used the comic to promote left-wing propaganda against the military junta. He, therefore, was subjected to an enforced disappearance during the National Reorganization Process. Since the comic was still popular in Europe, it was soon followed by a third part. Editors Alfredo Scutti from Ediciones Record (Argentina) and Alvaro Zerboni from Eura Editoriale (Italy) negotiated the terms. The new series would be published first in Italy, in the comic L'Eternauta, and then in the Argentine Skorpio.

The story had no credited authors, although it was written by Alberto Ongaro, with illustrations by Oswal, Mario Morhain, and Carlos Meglia. Oesterheld's self-insert character, Germán, who had been introduced at the end of part one of El Eternauta, was retained as a viewpoint character in the 1975 story. Solano López received proposals to draw the new comic, but refused to do so because of the tragic circumstances of the sequel, which was still close in time. As Ediciones Record insisted, he only drew some faces for future reference, and asked that the credits do not mention him. He drew the faces of the first thirty pages, based on Oswal's drafts. Morhain took over the art after the comic's editors "had squeezed all the juice they could out of his faces", according to Solano López. The resulting comic, he added, was "impersonal, cold".
