= Gustavo Trigo =

Argentine comic book artist (1940–1999)

- Born: Gustavo Ramón Trigo; September 27, 1940 Rosario, Argentina
- Died: July 28, 1999 (aged 58) Rome, Italy
- Area: Artist
- Pseudonyms: Marcos Adán, Al Siegel
- Notable works: ¡Marc! The War of the Antartes
- Collaborators: Héctor Germán Oesterheld; Robin Wood; Carlos Trillo; Giancarlo Berardi
- Spouses: Anabel Salafía (m. 1965); Miriam Carrasco
- Children: Julián, Nicoletta

Gustavo Ramón Trigo (Rosario, September 27, 1940 – Rome, July 28, 1999) was an Argentine painter and comic book artist. His most significant creations were ¡Marc!, published in Top Maxi-historietas, and La guerra de los Antartes (The War of the Antartes) in the newspaper Noticias, scripted by Héctor Germán Oesterheld. His realistic drawing style was characterized by attention to detail, a vital and confident line, strong black-and-white contrasts, and large onomatopoeia.

== Biography ==
=== Early life ===
Gustavo Trigo spent his childhood and youth in the city of Carcarañá, Santa Fe Province, where his innate passion for drawing and painting prevailed. During the 1950s, he exhibited several of his works in salons in Rosario, and in 1964 he won first prize in the Annual Contest of Modern Art in that city.

His first comic strip was El limpiapueblos (The Town Cleaner), written by himself, which was published in the magazine Tabú in 1958. He signed it as Marcos Adán, a pseudonym he used on numerous occasions throughout his career.

In the early 1960s, he settled in Buenos Aires, where he collaborated with Editorial Bruguera, illustrating standalone stories for the magazines Oklahoma and Círculo rojo. During this early stage of his career, he also published numerous works in the magazines Bala de Plata and X-9 by Ediciones Vima, with titles such as El viejo código (The Old Code), La última risa (The Last Laugh), and Desmemoriado (Forgetful).

In 1965, he married the psychologist Anabel Salafía, with whom he had his first son, Julián. That same year, he illustrated Súper volador, an "Argentine-made Superman" for Editorial Gente Joven, with scripts by Jorge Claudio Morhain.

=== Professional recognition ===
In 1968, he joined Editorial Columba, where he worked with writer Robin Wood on the cowboy comics Jackaroe and Ted Marlow, published in the magazines El Tony and D'Artagnan. He also worked with José Luis Arévalo on the slice-of-life series Gente de Blanco, which appeared in Intervalo Cinecolor.

In the early 1970s, in the magazine Top Maxihistorietas, Trigo illustrated Ernie Pike, featuring adventures set during the Vietnam War, and Andy Kogart, a private detective with the face of Humphrey Bogart (using the pseudonym Al Siegel). He also drew ¡Marc!, one of his emblematic creations, scripted by Osvaldo Lamborghini. The character Marc is the head of a group of consultants for an agency fighting international crime. He possesses Samurai-like qualities but is undeniably a Porteño (from Buenos Aires), depicted as a melancholic ruffian. In this irreverent comic with touches of black comedy, Trigo's drawing bordered on caricature and utilized creative and massive onomatopoeia, which became characteristic of his style. Eleven episodes of ¡Marc! were published between July 1971 and May 1972, at which point Editorial Cielosur closed the magazine due to economic reasons.

Around this time, Trigo joined Editorial Atlántida, creating film adaptations for Canal TV. In the magazine Para Ti, he published Angela de los Ángeles, and in Billiken, he illustrated series scripted by Héctor Germán Oesterheld: Marvo Luna (as Marcos Adán, in a duo with Roque Vitacca, from October 1972 to July 1973), Sherlock Holmes, and Sargento Kirk (the episode "Sangre y oro azteca", from February to May 1973), where Trigo's art presented a rustic touch that vigorously recreated the Old West. In the 1970s, he also created Maura vuela, a story where a woman takes flight due to an inability to walk, a mutilated investigator dreams of his past, and a Mexican man becomes obsessed with avenging his father.

Starting February 22, 1974, with scripts by Oesterheld, Trigo illustrated La guerra de los Antartes, which appeared as a daily strip on the humor page of the newspaper Noticias. In the story, the world is attacked by extraterrestrials with superior technology, and South America is handed over to the invaders by the great powers. For this work, Trigo opted for a realistic style with high-contrast black and white, endowing the series with action and dynamism accentuated by characters breaking out of the panels. On Saturday, August 3 of that year, police raided the newspaper's newsroom, and the paper was closed by a decree of the Executive Power, leaving the comic unfinished. According to Trigo, what attracted him to the series was "drawing people placed in a limit situation."

That same year, he began working at Ediciones Record, drawing standalone stories and the series Memorias del Riachuelo, Zero Galván (a continuation of Precinto 56), Jungla de asfalto, Serie Negra, and Búster, a detective story written by Guillermo Saccomanno. In these works, Trigo drew New York landscapes in wide shots that reflected the imprint cinema left on his art, particularly through visual language, framing, and setting.

=== Career in Europe ===
In the late 1970s, Gustavo Trigo moved to Italy. With his second wife, the Uruguayan Miriam Carrasco, he had a daughter named Nicoletta. In Italy, he worked for the publishing house Lancio Story, where he published Citta di Notte (1983) with scripts by Alberto Ongaro; Mack (1987) by Carlos Trillo; and Milton Krapp (1989), based on his own texts.

Meanwhile, he continued to collaborate with Ediciones Record in Argentina, illustrating Los gorilas de Cindy (Skorpio Extra, 1981), La Maga (a horror comic written by Eugenio Mandrini), and Mabel (Super Skorpio Gold Book, 1986) with scripts by Ongaro, among other works. In Superhumor, published by Ediciones La Urraca, he illustrated Gómez, scripted by Saccomanno. In the 1980s, he also illustrated several chapters of the series Quincy Romano for El Tony, written by Héctor Gambell, and published Tierra de monstruos (Land of Monsters) by Carlos Trillo in the Tucumán magazine Trix.

In 1986, in Italy, he began collaborating with Sergio Bonelli Editore, illustrating episodes of Dylan Dog (an investigator of nightmares) written by Tiziano Sclavi, Nick Raider (1988), a Manhattan homicide detective created by Claudio Nizzi, and Julia, a young criminologist scripted by Giancarlo Berardi.

In his final stage during the 1990s, he illustrated for Columba: Saxo (Cine Color Intervalo, 1992), Drakeldorf (El Tony, 1992), and Diego (D'Artagnan, 1995), all signed as Marcos Adán.

Trigo died at the age of 58 in Rome on July 28, 1999.
