= Elsa Sánchez de Oesterheld =

Argentine human rights activist (1925–2015)

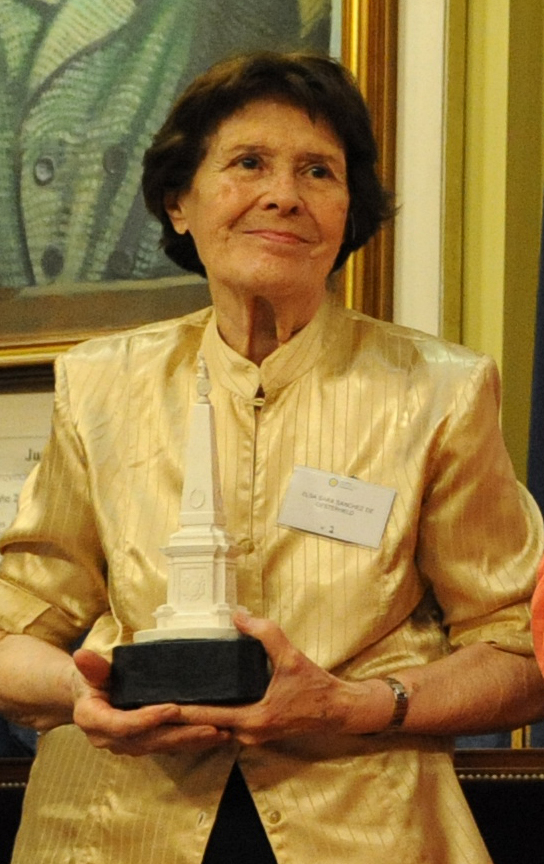
- Born: March 20, 1925; Buenos Aires, Argentina
- Died: June 22, 2015 (aged 90); Buenos Aires, Argentina
- Spouse: Héctor Germán Oesterheld (m. 1948)
- Children: 4

Elsa Sara Sánchez de Oesterheld (20 March 1925 — 22 June 2015) was an activist and advocate for disappeared persons of Argentina. She was the wife and only surviving immediate family member of comics writer and editor Héctor Germán Oesterheld.

== Biography ==
Elsa Sánchez was born in Buenos Aires in 1925 to Galician immigrants. She met future comics writer and editor Héctor Germán Oesterheld while they were college students in 1944. They married four years later. They had four daughters: Estela (b. 1952), Diana (b. 1953), Beatriz (b. 1955) and Marina (b. 1957). Her husband was a popular and influential writer of Argentine comics (known as historietas) including The Eternaut, Ernie Pike, Mort Cinder, and others.

At the beginning of the 1970s, Sánchez de Oesterheld's family became active in the leftist organization Juventud peronista, which was associated with militant opposition to the military junta. Sánchez de Oesterheld herself was the only member of her family to not join the movement. Her family went into hiding while she continued to work at a prominent bank and had limited contact with them for their safety.

== Disappearances and deaths of her family ==
Sánchez de Oesterheld's life changed dramatically when her family became victims of the Argentine dictatorship between 1976 and 1983. Her family was kidnapped by junta forces, based on their presumed membership in the Montoneros.

H.G. Oesterheld was abducted by military forces in April 1977 and then transported to a clandestine detention center within the Campo de Mayo military base. Some survivors of the secret military prison saw him alive in El Vesubio, and believe he was killed in or near Mercedes in 1978.

By the end of the 1970s, Sánchez de Oesterheld had lost her husband, her four daughters, three sons in law, and two of her four grandchildren, as two of her daughters were pregnant when they were captured by the junta.

=== Daughters and sons-in-law ===
Beatriz Oesterheld (murdered) was Sánchez de Oesterheld's youngest daughter and the only one whose body was recovered. She was last seen alive on June 19, 1976, when she met with her mother. After the meeting, Beatriz left for Villa la Cava, in San Isidro, where she was a guerilla, but she never arrived. Two days later, a stranger contacted Sánchez de Oesterheld with the information that Beatriz had been abducted by the military forces of the junta. Sánchez de Oesterheld went to the police and the Campo de Mayo and actively petitioned for the release of her daughter. On July 7, Sánchez de Oesterheld was informed by the police that her daughter had died along with five other children. Her daughter's body was released and she was buried.

Diana Oesterheld (disappeared), age 23, was four months pregnant when she was abducted on August 7, 1976. She was a member of the Montoneros. She was held in San Miguel de Tucuman by the Tucuman police, along with her one-year-old son Fernando Araldi Oesterheld. Her son was abandoned under the name "NN" at the children's home of Tucuman. After several attempts he was recovered by his paternal grandparents.

Diana's partner, Raúl Araldi, was murdered in 1977. A colleague saw his body at the Police Headquarters. She was last seen at the Police Headquarters of Tucumán, and it is believed that she was later taken to Campo de Mayo where she gave birth. As of 2024, this child has not been located.

Roberto “el Tuerto” Albornoz, the chief of the Tucumán police, allegedly orchestrated the kidnapping of Diana and her family, and also allegedly appropriated their family home and lived in it after they were disappeared.

Marina Oesterheld (disappeared), age 20. She was kidnapped along with her partner Alberto Oscar Seindus on November 27, 1976, in San Isidro. It is believed that Marina gave birth in Campo de Mayo. As of 2024, this child has also not been located.

Estela Inés Oesterheld (disappeared), age 25. Peronist militant and member of the Montoneros. She was kidnapped-disappeared in the southwest area of Greater Buenos Aires (Longchamps).

According to collected testimonies, on December 14, 1977, members of the police force killed Estela's husband “El Vasco” Mórtola. She tried to escape and was also killed by bullets while she was 4 months pregnant. She left behind a son who was then 3 1/2 years old: Martín Miguel. The perpetrators took the couple's son and presented him to his grandfather Hector at a secret prison. After this, the child was handed over to Sánchez de Oesterheld, who raised him.

== Activism and recognition ==
In her later life, Sánchez de Oesterheld became an activist for the remembrance of the disappeared, and was involved in the work of organizations including the Grandmothers of Plaza de Mayo. Despite this work, neither of her grandchildren believed to have been born during their mothers' captivity have been located, before or after her death.

In 1987, the Bremen Senate created the Bremen Solidarity Prize to honor the commitment of people and organizations working to overcome injustice in north–south relations and the consequences of colonialism and racism. Sánchez de Oesterheld received the award in 2005 for her work with The Commission of Mothers and Relatives of Missing Germans and People of German Descent (Héctor Germán Oesterheld's paternal ancestry was from Bremen).

Sánchez de Oesterheld was featured in several documentaries. In 1998, she was in H. G. O, a biography of her husband. In 2008, she participated in the documentary film Imaginadores, a film that analyses the evolution of the Argentine comic strip, using interviews with figures from the media as its main resource. In 2011, she was the subject of The Eternauta's Wife (La mujer del eternauta), directed by Adán Aliaga [es].

== Final years and death ==
Sánchez de Oesterheld died of an acute myocardial infarction at home on June 22, 2015, at the age of 90. She was buried in the Chacarita Cemetery.

== Filmography ==
- 1999: H. G. O. [es]
- 2008: Imaginadores [es]
- 2011: The Eternauta's Wife: The Widow of an Unlikely Political Activist (La mujer del eternauta)
