= 1969 in science fiction =

The year 1969 was marked, in science fiction, by the following:

== Events ==
- The 27th annual Worldcon, St. Louiscon, was held in St. Louis, USA
- The first Ditmar Awards were awarded at the Australian National Science Fiction Convention

== Births and deaths ==
=== Births ===
- John Scalzi

=== Deaths ===
- John Wyndham

== Literary releases ==
=== Novels ===
- The Andromeda Strain, by Michael Crichton
- Dune Messiah, by Frank Herbert
- The Jagged Orbit, by John Brunner
- The Left Hand of Darkness, by Ursula K. Le Guin
- The Man in the Maze, by Robert Silverberg
- Slaughterhouse-Five, by Kurt Vonnegut
- UBIK, by Philip K. Dick

=== Short stories ===
- "Dancing Gerontius", by Lee Harding
- "Supertoys Last All Summer Long", by Brian Aldiss

=== Comics ===
- Doraemon, by Fujiko F. Fujio, begins serialization
- The 1969 reboot of The Eternaut, by Héctor Germán Oesterheld and Alberto Breccia begins serialization in Argentine magazine Gente y la actualidad
- First issue of From Beyond the Unknown is published by DC Comics

== Movies ==
- The Computer Wore Tennis Shoes, dir. by Robert Butler
- Invasión, dir. by Hugo Santiago
- Stereo, dir. by David Cronenberg

== Television ==
- Night Gallery

== Video games ==
- Space Travel

== Other Media ==
- The first science fiction wargame, Lensman, is published

== Awards ==
=== Hugos ===
- Best novel: Stand on Zanzibar, by John Brunner
- Best novella: Nightwongs, by Robert Silverberg
- Best novelette: "The Sharing of Flesh", by Poul Anderson
- Best short story: " The Beast That Shouted Love at the Heart of the World", by Harlan Ellison
- Best dramatic presentation: 2001: A Space Odyssey, dir. by Stanley Kubrick; screenplay by Arthur C. Clarke and Stanley Kubrick; based on the story " The Sentinel" by Arthur C. Clarke
- Best professional magazine: The Magazine of Fantasy and Science Fiction, ed. by Edward L. Ferman
- Best professional artist: Jack Gaughan
- Best fanzine: Science Fiction Review, ed. by Richard E. Geis
- Best fan writer: Harry Warner Jr.
- Best fan artist: Vaughn Bodé

=== Nebulas ===
- Best novel: The Left Hand of Darkness, by Ursula K. Le Guin
- Best novella: A Boy and His Dog, by Harlan Ellison
- Best novelette: "Time Considered as a Helix of Semi-Precious Stones", by Samuel R. Delany
- Best short story: "Passengers (short story)", by Robert Silverberg

=== Other awards ===
- BSFA Award for Best Novel: Stand on Zanzibar, by John Brunner
