= Sherlock Time =

Argentine comic book

Publication information
- Publisher: Editorial Frontera
- Format: Ongoing series
- Genre: Science Fiction
- Publication date: December 1958 – September 1959
- No. of issues: 11

Creative team
- Written by: Héctor Germán Oesterheld
- Artist: Alberto Breccia

Sherlock Time is an Argentine comic book by Héctor Germán Oesterheld and Alberto Breccia.

== Premise ==
The retiree Julio Luna buys a mansion in San Isidro, whose previous owners disappeared in strange circumstances. It turns out that the tower of the mansion is actually a spaceship used to abduct people, but Luna is saved from that fate by Sherlock Time. From then on, Luna helps Time with his investigations, usually involving aliens and supernatural events.

== Editorial history ==
Sherlock Time was first published in Hora Cero extra #5, in 1958. Eleven short stories were published in Hora Cero Extra and Hora Cero Semanal, ending in 1959. The stories were reprinted in the comic book El Eternauta, also by Editorial Frontera, and in Pif Paf, by Ediciones Record. Ediciones Colihue published a trade paperback with all the stories in 1997.

== Reception ==
Comic book artist Juan Sasturain considers the comic a breakthrough in the genre. It was the first important joint work by Breccia and Oesterheld, the first episode was the best comic that Breccia made up to that point, and Oesterheld explored genres that he had not worked with previously. Sasturain considers that, with its mixture of horror and science fiction, Sherlock Time was unlike any other comic produced before.
