= Evita, the life and work of Eva Perón =

Evita, vida y obra de Eva Perón (Evita, the life and work of Eva Perón)
- 2002 edition by Doedytores
- Date: 2002
- Page count: 64 pages
- Publisher: Doedytores

Creative team
- Writers: Héctor Germán Oesterheld
- Pencillers: Alberto Breccia
- Editors: Javier Doeyo

Original publication
- Date of publication: 1968
- Language: Spanish

Evita, the life and work of Eva Perón (Spanish: Evita, vida y obra de Eva Perón) is an Argentine historical comic book by Héctor Germán Oesterheld and Alberto Breccia, which centers on the life of Eva Perón. It was censored at the time of its creation and was published only after Oesterheld's death.

== Editorial story ==
The Argentine comic book authors Héctor Germán Oesterheld and Alberto Breccia started in 1968 a number of comic books devoted to the biographies of important people in Latin American history. The first issue was Vida del Che (Spanish: Life of Che), a biographical comic about Che Guevara. When it was finished and published, they started working in one for Eva Perón. However, when Che's comic book was published, it was removed from distribution and all copies of it were destroyed and banned by the ruling military dictatorship at the time, self-styled as "Argentine Revolution" (1966–1973) —the original drawings were saved and hidden by Enrique Breccia (Alberto's son and a comic book artist himself, who illustrated the final chapter of Vida del Che), and it was finally republished in 2008— Knowing that he and Breccia were facing such a similar situation as with Vida del Che, Oesterheld stopped the whole project for Eva Perón's biographical comic. Although Oesterheld had finished the script and Breccia had completed the drawings, the final production was not finished.

Two years later, Breccia received a new offer to draw a comic book about Eva Perón. It had a politically neutral script, whereas the one by Oesterheld had a radical peronist style. The art was the same than in the unpublished comic book, but it was to be coloured, whereas the original was meant to be a black and white only comic book, such as Vida del Che.

In 1978, during Argentina's last civil-military dictatorship (1976–1983), Oesterheld was illegally kidnapped, disappeared and later murdered by the military junta. His daughters were also arrested and disappeared, as were his sons-in-law. Only HGO's wife, Elsa, escaped the family's tragic fate. Alberto Breccia died in 1993, when democracy was again ruling in Argentina since 1983.

In 2002, the editor Javier Doeyo found the original script written by Oesterheld at the house of Breccia's widow, while searching for material for another project. With this script, he could restore the original unpublished comic book. The art was already published as described, and the colours were removed to restore the originally intended black & white by using image editing software. The script received minor corrections, fixing outdated information. For instance, the fate of Evita's corpse was still unknown in 1968, whereas by 2002 it had been recovered and placed at La Recoleta cemetery.

The work was thus published in 2002 by Doedytores. In 2007 it was edited again by Clarín (this time with colour, following the 1970 version), along with Vida del Che, as part of a series of reprints of noteworthy comic books.

== Description ==
The comic book describes the life of Eva Perón in a biographical manner, from birth to death. It has a strong peronist point of view, and is highly critical of the military and other political forces. It does not employ the common techniques of the genre, and hasn't any speech balloons or sequential art. The drawings are used merely to illustrate the events being described by the text. Alberto Breccia would explain that "My work is testimonial, it can't be otherwise, because it includes characters like Goulart, Frondizi, Mao...".

Some pictures are made from famous photos or iconography of the time. For example, the first image (used by Doeyo to design the comic book cover) is based upon the cover of Evita's autobiography, La Razón de mi Vida.

== Bibliography ==
- Doeyo, Javier (2002). "Palabras del editor". Evita, vida y obra de Eva Perón (in Spanish). Buenos Aires: Doedytores. ISBN 987-9085-09-4.
- Martignone, Hernán; Dr. Sax (August 2005). "Alberto Breccia + Héctor G. Oesterheld". Comiqueando (in Spanish). 2 (2). Buenos Aires: Domus Editora: 4–11. ISSN 1669-3329.
