= José Antonio Muñoz =

Argentine comics artist

Muñoz
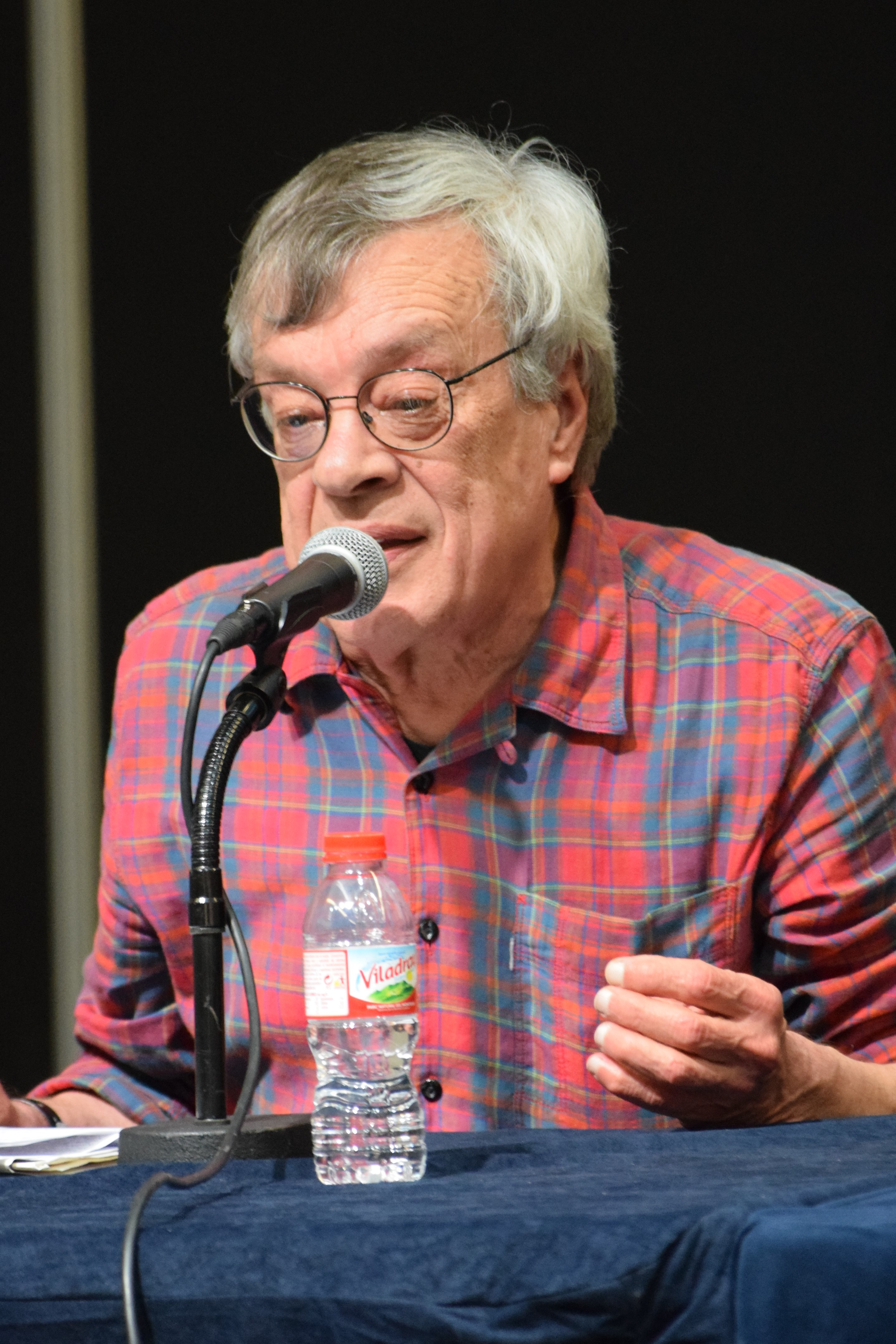
- Born: José Antonio Muñoz; July 10, 1942 (age 84) Buenos Aires, Argentina
- Area: Comics artist
- Notable works: Alack Sinner
- Awards: Full list

A frame from Muñoz/Sampayo strip Alack Sinner, Flic ou Privé, displayed in Centre Belge de la Bande Dessinée, Brussels

José Antonio Muñoz or simply Muñoz (born July 10, 1942) is an Argentine comics artist. He is most notable for his influential black-and-white artwork. His hardboiled graphic novels series Alack Sinner (with writer Carlos Sampayo) is a noted source for Frank Miller's Sin City and the artwork in 100 Bullets by Eduardo Risso.

== Biography ==
Muñoz was born in Buenos Aires. He studied at the Escuela Panamericana de Arte under Hugo Pratt and Alberto Breccia, and worked as an assistant to Francisco Solano López.

In 1972 he moved to Spain and then to Italy and began a collaboration with Argentine writer Carlos Sampayo which produced, among others, the detective series Alack Sinner (sometimes misspelled "Allack Sinner") and its spin-offs Joe's Bar and Sophie, as well as a comics biography of Billie Holiday.

His style is characterised by a sharp line, heavy chiaroscuro, and exaggerated, sometimes grotesque, faces and figures. His work has had a strong influence on Argentine Alberto Breccia, his teacher. Also British artists Dave McKean and Warren Pleece, and US artists Frank Miller (for part of his Sin City style) and Keith Giffen.

The cartoonist and critic Scott McCloud, in Understanding Comics (1993), wrote that "in José Muñoz's work, dense puddles of ink and fraying linework combine to evoke a world of depravity and morbid decay".

== Awards ==
- 1978: Best Foreign Realistic Work at the Angoulême International Comics Festival, France
- 1983: Best Comic Book at the Angoulême International Comics Festival
- 1994: Harvey Award for Best American Edition of Foreign Material
- 2002: Special Prize for outstanding life’s work at the Max & Moritz Prizes, Germany
- 2007: Grand Prix de la ville d'Angoulême at the Angoulême International Comics Festival, France
- 2010: U Giancu's Prize, International Cartoonists Exhibition, Rappollo, Italy
- 2022: Platinum Konex Award for his work in the last decade, Konex Foundation, Argentina.
