= Asso di Picche =

Italian comic series

- Author(s): Hugo Pratt, Mario Faustinelli, Alberto Ongaro
- Current status/schedule: Concluded
- Launch date: 1945; 81 years ago
- End date: 1949; 77 years ago
- Genre: Crime comics

Asso di Picche was an Italian comic series featuring an eponymous masked crime fighter who combats an international crime syndicate known as the Band of Panthers. The action occurs all over the world, but chiefly in a dark, melancholic version of San Francisco. It was created in 1945 by Mario Faustinelli, Alberto Ongaro and Hugo Pratt. Editorial work was by Faustinelli and Ongaro wrote the text, while Pratt did the initial pencil drawings which were later revised in ink by Faustinelli. It was concluded in 1949.

Pratt's illustrative style in Asso di Picche has been compared to that of Milton Caniff in Terry and the Pirates (1934). The character itself is thought to have been inspired by both The Phantom (1936) by Lee Falk and Ray Moore and The Spirit (1940) by Will Eisner.
