= The Eternaut 1969 =

Argentine comic book

- Cover of the 2020 edition by Fantagraphics Comics

Publication information
- Publisher: Gente
- Format: Limited series
- Genre: Horror, post-apocalyptic
- Publication date: 1969

Creative team
- Written by: Héctor Germán Oesterheld
- Artist(s): Alberto Breccia
- Inker(s): Alberto Breccia

The Eternaut 1969 is a reboot of the Argentine comic book The Eternaut written by Héctor Germán Oesterheld and illustrated/inked by Alberto Breccia. The publication was canceled by the editor before it was completed, due to the discontent shared by the magazine's usual readers and the publisher itself, who disapproved both the new version's overtly political tone written by Oesterheld and the avant-garde and horror-related look that Breccia gave the comic.

== Publication history ==
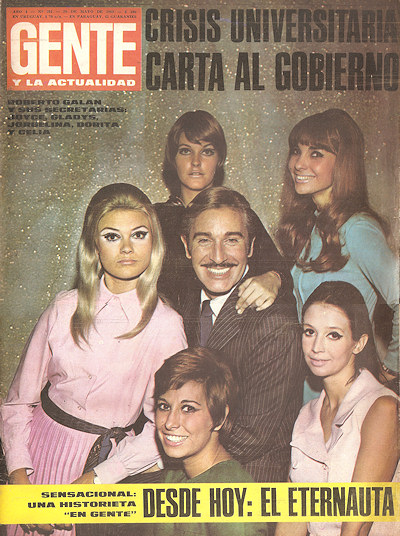
Gente #201, first issue with the comic book

The Eternaut was a comic originally published by Héctor Germán Oesterheld and Francisco Solano López in 1957. The story centered on an alien invasion in Buenos Aires, and had no overt political tone, since Oesterheld himself was largely apolitical at that point in his life. By 1969 the Cold War was in full effect in South America, with several armed guerrillas promoting rebellions and uprisings. By this time, Oesterheld had turned to the left, influenced by his daughters, who had joined Montoneros. Some of Oesterheld's previous works in the 1960s were the biographies of Che Guevara and Eva Perón, Vida del Che and Evita, the life and work of Eva Perón respectively, and also "El Astrón de La Plata", which used an alien invasion as an allegory of military dictatorships.

The new comic, also named El Eternauta, was a reboot of the original. The story was mostly the same, but with an anti-imperialist message: instead of a worldwide disaster, the aliens only invade South America after negotiating with the primary world powers so they can conquer that portion of the world while sparing the Northern Hemisphere.

Among the changes to the original story, the young man named Pablo is replaced by Susana, a woman that joins the resistance with the male characters; the female characters in the original had no noteworthy roles in the story. Also Mosca, the comic relief character, is killed shortly after being introduced. And, whereas the art of Solano López was realistic and detailed, Alberto Breccia turned it into a horror comic, starting his own personal shift towards the horror genre, which would dominate most of Breccia's work for the rest of his life.

The comic was disliked by the regular audience of Gente, so the editor requested Breccia to change the art. Breccia refused, so the comic was canceled. Oesterheld then negotiated to have a few extra pages, so that the story could be concluded, even if it meant rushing it. The editor explained with apologies to the creative team.

In the magazine we had a great chance with The Eternaut, a story that, as you remember, we saw it and that's why we published it. Apologies to Breccia, a great penciller and dare I say artist, but us, in our mission, should not have given ourselves to the esthetic nature of his drawings, which is for moments unintelligible

— Carlos Fontanarrosa

The comic was published in Italy and Spain in 1970, in El Globo, and became a success. The first republication in Argentina was in 1982, by Ediciones de la Urraca. Fantagraphics released the first edition in English in 2020, translated by Erica Mena. It is part of "The Alberto Breccia Library".

== Plot ==
Héctor Germán Oesterheld is at home at night, when a man suddenly appears and narrates his story. This man, Juan Salvo, was at his own home with his friends, Favalli, Lucas, and Polski, playing Truco. Salvo's family, his wife Elena and his daughter Martita, were also at home. The lights go out and they notice a snowfall that kills people. Polski leaves the house anyway to return with his family, and dies only a few steps away from the door. A radio broadcast explains that the snowfall is the first attack of an alien invasion, and that the world powers surrendered South America to the invaders to avoid being attacked. Favalli, Salvo, and Lucas prepare home-made hazard suits to be able to leave the house and get supplies. Salvo rescues Susana, a young woman trapped in a basement, and Lucas is killed by another survivor who later attacks the house. Although the attacker is killed, they decide that the city is too dangerous because of the anarchy and that they should flee. Before doing so, however, the army shows up and recruits them for the resistance. Juan Salvo, Favalli, and Susana go with them, while Elena and Martita stay at home.

The army faces the invaders, giant beetles, near the General Paz highway, and manages to seize one of their weapons, a giant lightthrower. The march is difficult because buildings fall down and block most streets, so the army sets a temporary base at the River Plate stadium. The army is attacked as well by robot-men, survivors under control of the invaders by devices in their necks, similar to those of the beetles. Franco realizes that the robot-men and beetles came from somewhere in Belgrano, so he scouts the area with Salvo. They discover the "Hand", the alien who manages the military operations, but he turns out to be yet another alien under control of the actual invaders, that he simply called "they". Most of the army is killed in an ambush at Plaza Italia, and only Salvo, Franco, Susana and Favalli manage to escape. They destroy the main headquarters of the invasion at Plaza del Congreso and flee from Buenos Aires. They are attacked again, Franco, Susana, and Favalli are turned into robot-men, and Salvo manages to turn on the time machine of a flying saucer, being displaced to another dimension. After several years of interdimensional travels seeking his wife and kid, who got displaced elsewhere, he appeared at Oesterheld's house.

Then he realizes that he is in Buenos Aires, two years earlier. He runs home, reunites with his family, and forgets everything. The arrival of Favalli, Lucas, and Polski to play truco confirms to Oesterheld that the story was true, and he decides to make a comic book version of it, to warn about the danger.

== Reception ==
Hernán Ostuni and Fernando García from Comiqueando consider it a literary classic, defining it as "a work that people talk about even if they haven't actually read it". They praise both the higher political tone of the story, and the dark and experimental style of Breccia, which they define as lovecraftian horror. They consider it an up-to-date comic, despite the years passed since publication.
