= Ernie Pike =

- Ernie Pike, drawn by Alberto Breccia.

Publication information
- Publisher: Editorial Frontera
- First appearance: Hora Cero #1 (May 1957)
- Created by: Héctor Germán Oesterheld, Hugo Pratt

Ernie Pike is a comics series written by Héctor Germán Oesterheld and originally drawn by Hugo Pratt, starring a World War II and Korean War reporter. It was first published in the magazine Hora Cero in Buenos Aires, Argentina, in 1957. The reporter, loosely based on the real reporter Ernie Pyle, acts as a narrator of stories, without being directly involved in them. Such stories do not narrate real battles or exploits of noteworthy military people, being instead tragic stories of unknown soldiers, made up by the author. Oesterheld worked again with the character during the time of the Vietnam War, and Ricardo Barreiro used it for a brief story about the Falklands War.

== Overview ==
The comic is set during World War II, and the protagonist - Ernie Pike - is the narrator, without playing an active role in the stories. Unlike genre standards, the comic does not show any battles, and neither describes the war between Allies and Nazis as a conflict between good and evil. Instead, it centers on tragic events involving soldiers of both sides. Generally, those tragedies are misunderstandings that end up badly: characters who go mad, kill their own friends by friendly fire or because they believe them to be traitors, attempt to get killed in a specific way to avoid a more gruesome death, or who must mercy-kill badly hurt comrades, to cite several examples. Oesterheld, thus, utilizes war comics to reflect his personal dislike of war itself. The character never formulates positive or negative opinions about the Allies, the Nazis or specific events of the war, but about the morality of the soldiers in the anecdotes. The stories take place at various locations of World War II, such as the European Theatre, the South Pacific ocean, the North African Campaign and the Eastern Front.

There are no recurring characters besides Ernie Pike, and in many cases even his presence is small: he appears in just two panels in "Kumba", only one in "El amuleto", and in some stories he is completely absent. The character also evolves along the published issues from a war correspondent character acting in a first-person narrative to a narrator with an omniscient point-of-view, aware of stories and information beyond the capabilities of a real reporter.

== Creation ==
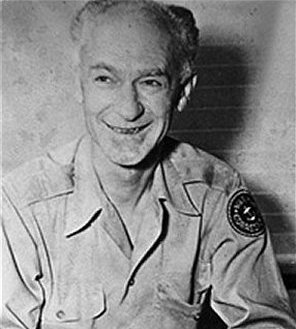
Ernie Pyle, American war reporter who inspired Oesterheld into the creation of the Ernie Pike character.

The name of the protagonist was reminiscent of that of Ernie Pyle, a well known real life war correspondent of the era. Unlike Ernie Pyle, Ernie Pike survives the war and is referenced as a veteran in other stories by Pratt. The face of Ernie Pike resembles that of Oesterheld himself. This was caused by a misunderstanding during the period of designing of the character: when Oesterheld was describing to Pratt the positive traits of the new character, he ended saying "Make him like me!". However, Pratt did not realize that Oesterheld was joking, and used his face. By the time Oesterheld realized the mistake, Pratt's work was already advanced, so he let it stay that way.

Oesterheld was influenced by anti-war authors, such as Erich Maria Remarque, Stephen Crane or Leo Tolstoy; as well as by the career of the mentioned Ernie Pyle. Pratt also revealed that he stole more than four hundred of war photos from the staff of Il Gazzettino di Venezia, which were used by the artist as inspiration for the comic strip. Oesterheld was also influenced by those photos, and many stories were inspired by specific photos that led the author to develop a story about them.

== Publishing history ==
The comic was first published in Hora Cero magazine, of the Frontera publishing company. After several years, Hugo Pratt left for Europe, while Oesterheld stayed in Argentina. Hugo Pratt republished Ernie Pike in Italy and other European countries under his sole name. Oesterheld continued the comic with other Argentine artists, like Alberto Breccia and Francisco Solano López, among others. The character was moved to other Frontera magazines, such as Hora Cero Extra, the weekly supplement of Hora Cero, or Colección batallas inolvidables (Spanish: Unforgettable battles collection). This last one was created after the success of Ernie Pike, and was focused on war comics. The Ernie Pike run in Frontera is considered part of the golden age of Argentine comics. By the decade of 1960 most pencilers of Frontera were being hired by the British Fleetway, but Oesterheld kept using new pencilers such as José Muñoz. Frontera would eventually go into bankruptcy.

Oesterheld worked again with Ernie Pike in the 1970 decade, in the Top Maxi Historietas comic book published by Cielosur Editora. The approach was slightly changed in this new run: instead of World War II, the stories were about the ongoing Vietnam War. The stories kept the same style as before, but Pike was now involved with the events as they took place, thus becoming an active character of the stories instead of just the narrator. The stories were also more critical of the involvement of the US in the war, in line with the new politically radical views that Oesterheld was developing. Oesterheld would work later with many strips in the Skorpio comic book, but Ernie Pike would last only for a single story. This story, penciled by Solano López, worked again with World War II, but from a new angle: it was a story set in current times, about people having a dispute about things that took place during the war.

There was a brief recreation of the character by other authors during the Falklands War. Ricardo Barreiro wrote "La batalla de las Malvinas" (Spanish: The battle of the Malvinas), penciled by Alberto Macagno, Carlos Pedrazzini, Marcelo Pérez and César Medrano. This story lasted for 7 issues of the magazine Fierro, ending inconclusively. Ernie Pike was included as a guest-star, placed in Patagonia as an aged war veteran, watching the events unfolding.

Several volumes of Ernie Pike by Oesterheld-Pratt - along others of Sergeant Kirk - were reprinted in 2006 for the Nueva Biblioteca Clarín de la Historieta collection published by Clarín newspaper. Previously, Ancares Editora had reprinted the volumes by Oesterheld-Breccia in 2002.

== Bibliography ==
- Sasturain, Juan (1995). El domicilio de la aventura (in Spanish). Buenos Aires: Colihue. ISBN 978-950-581-261-5.
- Sasturain, Juan; Diego Accorsi (2006). Nueva Biblioteca Clarín de la Historieta 3: Sargento Kirk / Ernie Pike (in Spanish). Buenos Aires: Clarín. ISBN 978-950-782-887-4.
- Martignone, Hernán; Dr. Sax (August 2005). "Alberto Breccia + Héctor G. Oesterheld". Comiqueando (in Spanish). 2 (2): 4–11. ISSN 1669-3329.
- García, Fernando (2007). Ernie Pike: Cuatro Décadas (in Spanish). Buenos Aires: Doedytores. ISBN 978-987-9085-29-5.
