= Stefano Knuchel =

Swiss documentary film director, screenwriter, and producer

- Born: 1966 (age 59–60); Locarno
- Occupations: film director, screenwriter, producer
- Years active: 1998–present

Stefano Knuchel is a Swiss documentary film director, screenwriter, and producer.

== Biography ==
Knuchel spent his childhood traveling around Europe with his family. He graduated from the Conservatory of Fribourg in 1987, in 2001 – from The Film & Photographic Workshop Rockport, Maine. In 1988, he started working at the Italian-language Swiss Radio Rete. Ten years later, he moved to Swiss Television and hosted experimental programmes, at the same time working as a critic and a writer.

In 2004, he founded a production company Venus and beyond and created his first documentary, Nocaut (2004), which was presented during the Semaine de la critique of the Locarno Film Festival.

His third documentary, Hugo en Afrique, was released in 2009. An homage to Hugo Pratt, it was selected for the Horizons competition at the Venice Film Festival and won Bisato d'Oro for Best Director by the independent jury of film critics.

In 2017, he released Quand j'étais Cloclo, a tragicomic story of his family.

Knuchel is the director of Locarno Filmmakers Academy and the founder of BaseCamp, an educational initiative for emerging filmmakers.

In 2021, Knuchel presented Hugo in Argentina at the Venice Film Festival and was screened at numerous film festivals. The film covers Pratt's Argentine years: landed in Buenos Aires in 1950, Pratt was dreaming about the United States, but fell in love with Argentina and remained there, overwhelmed with its vibrance.

In 2022, Knuchel announced working on the third film about Hugo Pratt, Hugo in Venice.

== Filmography ==
- 2022 — Dawn Chorus (writer)
- 2021 — Hugo in Argentina
- 2017 — Quand j'étais Cloclo
- 2009 — Hugo en Afrique
- 2005 — Paint Me a Life
- 2004 — Nocaut
