= Carlos Sampayo =

Argentine writer (born 1943)

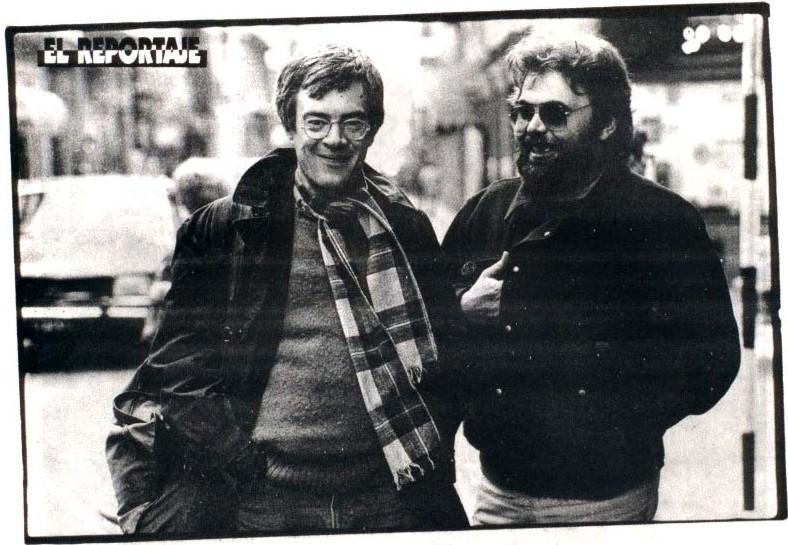
- Carlos Sampayo (right) with José Muñoz
- Born: September 17, 1943; Carmen de Patagones, Argentina
- Occupation(s): Writer, poet, comics writer. music critic

Carlos Sampayo (born 17 September 1943) is an Argentine writer best known for his work in comics, particularly in collaboration with artist José Muñoz.

Sampayo was born in Carmen de Patagones, but left Argentina in the early 1970s for political reasons, and stayed in Italy, France and settled in Spain.

He is also a poet and a literature and music (particularly jazz) critic.

== Partial bibliography ==
Alack Sinner

- Mémoires d'un Privé (1977)
- Viet Blues (1986)
- Rencontres (1984)
- Nicaragua (1988)
- Souvenirs d'un Privé (1999)
- La Fin d'un Voyage (1999)
- Histoires Privées (2000)
- L'Affaire USA (2006)

Joe's Bar

- Le Bar à Joe (1981)
- Histoire Amicale du Bar à Joe (1987)
- Dans les Bars (2002)

Other Muñoz and Sampayo books

- Sophie (1981, Vertige Graphic)
- Sudor Sudaca (1986, Futuropolis). Republished under the title Automne et Printemps (1997)
- Jeu de Lumieres (1988, Albin Michel)
- L'Europe En Flammes (1990, Albin Michel)
- Billie Holiday (1991, Casterman)
- Le Cheval Sans Tête IV: Un héritage (1997, Amok Éditions)
- Le Poète (1999, Vertige Graphic)
- Le Livre (2004, Casterman)

Other comic book titles

- L'Agent de la nationale (1982, Michel Deligne). Artists Julio Schiaffino, Jorge Zentner
- Evaristo (1985, Dargaud). Artist Francisco Solano López

Novels

- El lado salvaje de la vida (1991)
- El año que se escapó el león (2000)
- En panne Seiche (2002)

Other titles

- Paraguay, crónica de un exterminio (Treatise - 1978)
- Fragmentos (Poetry - 1998)
- Memorias de un ladrón de discos (1999)
