= Fort Wheeling =

Wheeling on the front page of Misterix no. 700 (1962)

Fort Wheeling, or simply Wheeling, is the title of a comics series set in colonial North America, by Italian comics creator Hugo Pratt.

== Publication history ==
Wheeling first appeared in the Argentine comics magazine Misterix in 1962. The series has since 1972 been reprinted in several editions, among these collections by publishers Florenzo Ivaldi, Casterman and Les Humanoïdes Associés.

== Synopsis ==
Patrick Fitzgerald, aristocrat, and Chris Kenton, Virginian, are young soldiers serving on the frontier of Great Britain's American colonies just prior to the American Revolution. During the French and Indian war they fall in love with the beautiful Mohena, a captive rescued from the Shawnee Indians. When the American Revolution begins, however, the two friends choose different sides.
