= Pancho López (comics) =

Early Argentine comic strip

- Author: Abel Santa Cruz
- Illustrator: Alberto Breccia
- Language: Spanish
- Genre: Comics
- Publication date: 1957
- Publication place: Argentina

Pancho López was an Argentine comics series in 1957 in Pancho López magazine by the writer Abel Santa Cruz, under the pseudonym Lépido Frías, and the cartoonist Alberto Breccia. It featured the humorous adventures of a little Mexican boy called Pancho López.

== Plot ==
Pancho López was inspired by a song of the same name popular at the time. The first comic was published on September 9, 1957.

== Characters ==
Pancho López is a Mexican boy from the fictional village of Chapango, which partakes in charro and lives on a ranch with his horse "Chihuahua"; a hen named Felicia; and a cat named Valentín. As the song goes, "chiquito, pero matón", although he goes to school every day, he still protects the village from the abuse of Caporal Hermino, and smokes cigars of chocolate.
