= Editorial Frontera =

Argentine comics publisher

Frontera
- Logo of Editorial Frontera
- Founded: 1956
- Founder: Héctor Germán Oesterheld
- Defunct: 1959
- Country of origin: Argentina
- Headquarters location: Buenos Aires
- Fiction genres: Science fiction comics War comics Western comics

Editorial Frontera was an Argentine publisher of comic books, which lasted from 1956 to 1961. It was established by the author Héctor Germán Oesterheld.

== History ==
Héctor Germán Oesterheld created two popular characters for the Misterix magazine, of the Abril publisher: Bull Rocket and Sergeant Kirk. He wrote novelizations of both comic books, and published them on his own, in a joint business with his brother Jorge. The success prompted him to start his own publishing house. He negotiated the characters with Cesare Civita, owner of Abril. It was arranged that Bull Rocket would stay in Misterix, written by new authors, and Oesterheld would take Kirk to his new publishing house, alongside the artist Hugo Pratt.

The first comic books were the Comics anthologies Frontera and Hora Cero. The first was first published in April 1957, and the second in May 1957. Oesterheld wrote the most part of the scripts, either using his name or pseudonyms as "H. Sturgiss" or "C. de la Vega", and his brother wrote the rest, signing as "Jorge Mora". The anthologies were a success, and Frontera published new related magazines, "Suplemento Semanal Hora Cero", Hora Cero extra" and "Frontera extra".

Some comics included in the anthologies soon become successful enough to have their own runs, such as Ernie Pike and Ticonderoga by Pratt, Randall the Killer by Arturo del Castillo, Sherlock Time by Alberto Breccia, Joe Zonda and Rolo, el marciano adoptivo by Francisco Solano López. The weekly publication El Eternauta, by Oesterheld and Solano López, was first published on September 4, 1957, at "Hora Cero semanal", and lasted until 1959.

Frontera decayed in 1959, as most artists were hired to work in Europe. Frontera fell into bankruptcy in 1959, and the magazines were taken by the publisher Emilio Ramírez to pay debts. They were published until 1963.
