= Mort Cinder =

Argentine comics series

- Mort Cinder, the main character from the series. Art by Alberto Breccia.

Publication information
- Publisher: Editorial Abril
- Schedule: Monthly
- Genre: Horror; Science fiction Mystery; Historical
- Publication date: June 1962 – February 1964

Creative team
- Written by: Hector German Oesterheld
- Penciller: Alberto Breccia

Mort Cinder is an Argentine comic book horror-science fiction series featuring an eponymous character, created in 1962 by writer Héctor Germán Oesterheld and artist Alberto Breccia. It is widely considered as one of the best comic strips ever produced in Argentina.

== Publication history ==
The character Mort Cinder appeared for the first time on August 17, 1962, in Nº 718 the Argentinian magazine Misterix, although the series previously made its debut on July 20, 1962, in the prologue story Ezra Winston el anticuario featuring only the antiques dealer Ezra Winston. The Mort Cinder series run ended in N° 798 Misterix, on February 28, 1964. It has been translated and published in France, Germany, Italy, Spain, Yugoslavia and Poland and an English translation was published by Fantagraphics Books in 2018.

== Synopsis ==
Cinder is an enigmatic man that comes back from the grave each time he dies. In his very first appearance, Cinder was presented as an assassin who has just been executed. Some mysterious lead-eyed men are awaiting his resurrection from the grave, planning to use his brain for a horrifying experiment. Winston, called by supernatural messages, comes to save him. Cinder has lived since ancient times, and took part in many famous historical episodes including the building of the Tower of Babel, World War I and the Battle of Thermopylae. His origin, as well as his unearthly skills, were never explained by the authors. He has been described as "an unquiet conscience of humanity, a witness, sometimes sorrowfully torpid, of the great and small events of the Man, though often a rebellious one who never surrendered to those trying to silence him" (Alessio Lega).

== Bibliography ==
- 0. Ezra Winston, el antiquario (1962) Prologue
- 1. Los ojos de plomo (1962)
- 2. La madre de Charlie (1962)
- 3. La torre de Babel (1962–63)
- 4. En la penitenciaria: Marlin
- 5. En la penitenciaria: El Frate (1963)
- 6. Sacrificio a la luna (El vitral) (1963)
- 7. La goleta de los esclavos (1963)
- 8. La tumba de Lisis (1963)
- 9. La batalla de las Termopilas (1963–64)

== Inspiration ==
Cinder's face is the one of Breccia's friend and assistant, Horacio Lalia, while that of Ezra Winston is actually Alberto Breccia's own as an old man.
