= Alberto Breccia =

Uruguayan-Argentine artist and cartoonist (1919–1993)

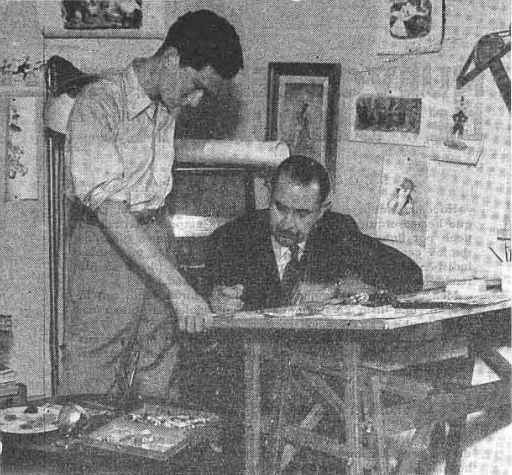
- Alberto Breccia, right, pictured with a helper at his workshop (1953)
- Born: April 15, 1919 Montevideo, Uruguay
- Died: November 10, 1993 (aged 74) Buenos Aires, Argentina
- Areas: Writer; Artist
- Pseudonym: El Viejo (The Old Man)
- Notable works: Mort Cinder; Perramus; The Eternaut 1969; Adaptations of Lovecraft's Cthulhu Mythos
- Children: Enrique Breccia; Patricia Breccia; Cristina Breccia

Signature
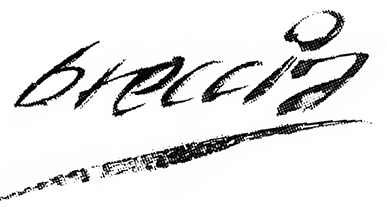

Alberto Breccia (April 15, 1919 – November 10, 1993) was a Uruguayan-born Argentine artist and cartoonist. His son Enrique Breccia and daughter Patricia Breccia are also comic book artists.

Comic book author Frank Miller considers Breccia as one of his personal mentors, even declaring that (regarding modernity in comics): "it all started with Breccia".

== Biography ==
Born in Montevideo, Uruguay, Breccia moved with his parents to Buenos Aires, Argentina, when he was three years old. After leaving school, Breccia worked in a tripe packing plant and in 1938 he got a job for the magazine El Resero, where he wrote articles and drew the covers.

He began to work professionally in 1939, when he joined the publishing house Manuel Láinez. He worked on magazines such as Tit-Bits, Rataplán and El Gorrión where he created comic strips such as Mariquita Terremoto, Kid Río Grande, El Vengador (based on a popular novel), and other adaptations.

During the 1950s he became an honorary member of the "Group of Venice" that consisted of expatriate Italian artists such as Hugo Pratt, Ivo Pavone, Horacio Lalia, Faustinelli and Ongaro. Other honorary members were Francisco Solano López, Carlo Cruz and Arturo Perez del Castillo. With Hugo Pratt, he started the Pan-American School of Art in Buenos Aires. In 1957 he joined publisher Editorial Frontera, under the direction of Héctor Germán Oesterheld, where he created several Ernie Pike stories. In 1958 Breccia's series Sherlock Time ran in the comic magazine Hora Cero Extra, with scripts by Oesterheld.

In 1960 he began to work for European publishers via a Buenos Aires-based art agency: for British publishing house Fleetway he drew a few westerns and war stories. This period did not last long. His son Enrique Breccia would also draw a few war stories for Fleetway in the late 1960s, such as Spy 13.

Breccia and Oesterheld collaborated to produce one of the most important comic strips in history, Mort Cinder, in 1962. The face of the immortal Cinder is modeled after Breccia's assistant, Horacio Lalia, and the appearance of his companion, the antique dealer Ezra Winston, is actually Breccia's own. Cinder and Winston's strip began on July 26, 1962, in issue Nº 714 of Misterix magazine, and ran until 1964 .

In 1968 Breccia was joined by his son, Enrique, in a project to draw the comic biography of Che, the life of Che Guevara, again with a script provided by Oesterheld.

In 1969 Oesterheld wrote a reboot of El Eternauta, for the Argentinian magazine Gente. Breccia drew the story with a decidedly experimental style, resorting to diverse techniques. The resulting work was anything but conventional and moving away from the commercial. Breccia refused to modify its style, which added to the tone of the script, and was much different from Francisco Solano López original.

During the seventies, Breccia makes major graphic innovations in black and white and color with series like Un tal Daneri and Chi ha paura delle fiabe?, written by Carlos Trillo. On the last one, a satire based on Brothers Grimm's tales, he plays with texture, mixing collage, acrylic and watercolor. This technique will be used later in the eighties by American and British authors such as Bill Sienkiewicz and Dave McKean.

Other stories include: Cthulhu Mythos, Buscavidas (text by Carlos Trillo), a Historia grafica del Chile and Perramus, inspired by the work of the poet Juan Sasturain a pamphlet against the dictatorship in Argentina.

Breccia died in Buenos Aires in 1993.

== Partial bibliography ==
- Mariquita Terremoto
- Kid Río Grande
- El Vengador
- Jean de Martinica
- Vito Nervio (1947–1959 and 1974), with stories by Leonardo Wadel
- Mision Thyuraine (1961), with stories by Leonardo Wadel
- Pancho López (1956)
- Ernie Pike, written by Héctor Germán Oesterheld
- Sherlock Time (1958–1959), written by Oesterheld
- Mort Cinder (1962–1964), written by Oesterheld
- Richard Long (1966), written by Oesterheld
- Vida del Che (1968), written by Oesterheld, with additional art by Enrique Breccia
- The Eternaut 1969, written by Oesterheld
- Evita, vida y obra de Eva Perón (1970), written by Oesterheld
- Squadra Zenith (1972–1974)
- Los Mitos de Cthulhu (1973), written by Norberto Buscaglia, from text by H. P. Lovecraft
- Un Tal Daneri (1974–1978), written by Trillo
- El Corazón Delator (1975), based on The Tell-Tale Heart by Edgar Allan Poe
- El Aire (1976), written by Guillermo Saccomanno
- Nadie (1977), written by Trillo.
- Chi ha paura delle fiabe? (1979–1981), written by Trillo.
- Buscavidas (1981), written by Trillo
- Perramus (1983), written by Juan Sasturain
- Drácula, Dracul, Vlad?, Bah... (1984)
- Informe Sobre Ciegos (1991), based on a chapter of On Heroes and Tombs by Ernesto Sábato
- El Dorado, El Delirio de Lope de Aguirre (1992), written by Carlos Albiac
- Martín Fierro, adaptation of the Martín Fierro poem by José Hernández
- Platos Voladores Al Ataque!!, written by Oesterheld
