= Enrique Breccia =

Argentine comic book artist and writer

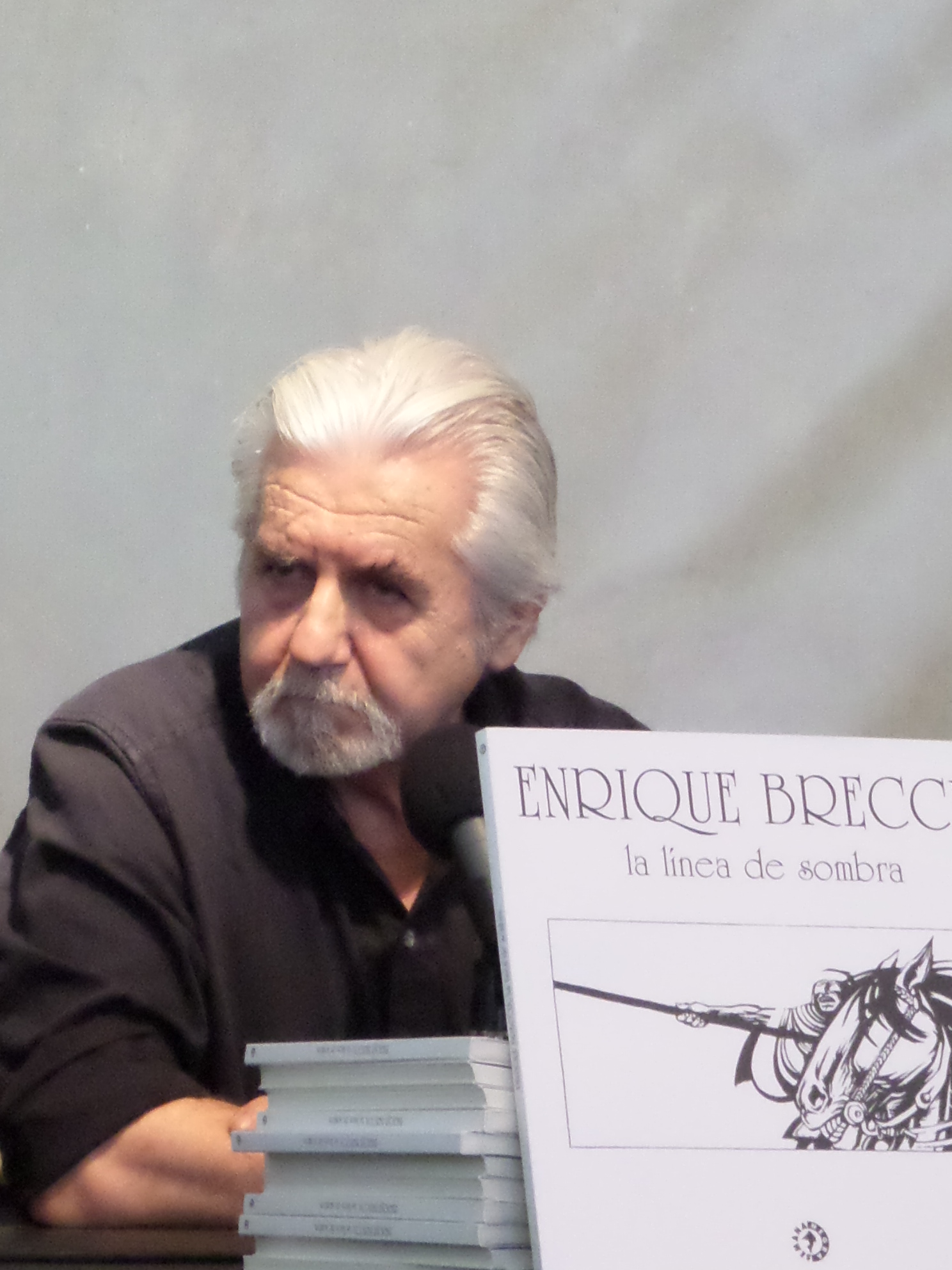
- Breccia in 2014
- Born: 1945 (age 80–81) Buenos Aires, Argentina
- Areas: Comic book artist, writer
- Notable works: Vida del Che; Alvar Mayor; El Cazador del Tiempo; El peregrino de la Estrellas; Swamp Thing

Enrique Breccia (born 1945) is an Argentine comic book artist and writer.

== Biography ==
Enrique Breccia, the son of noted comic artist Alberto Breccia, drew his first work in 1968, when together with his father illustrated Vida del Che ("Life of Che"), a biographical Historieta of the famous revolutionary Che Guevara written by Héctor Germán Oesterheld. In 1972, he started his collaboration with the British publishing house Fleetway, drawing the comic book Spy 13 under a pseudonym, and later a series of war stories for the Italian magazine Linus.

His collaboration with writer Carlos Trillo began in 1976 with the comic El Buen Dios ("The Good God"), immediately followed by Alvar Mayor, his most famous character with whom he entered the world comic book scene. He had several other successful collaborations with Trillo, the mini series El peregrino de la Estrellas, the surreal series Los Viajes del Marco Mono and the painted El Reino del Azul. In 1983, he drew Ibáñez from the script of Robin Wood, and the next year the highly successful El Sueñero and El Cazador del Tiempo from his own scripts. He also drew several comic book adaptions of famous novels such as Till Eulenspiegel, Treasure Island and Moby Dick. In 1987, he published the graphic novel Lope de Aguirre and in 1995 De Mar a Mar.

In 2000, Breccia began his collaboration with American comic book publishers, working on an issue of X-Force for Marvel, and Legion Worlds and Batman: Gotham Knights for DC Comics. In 2002, he drew the graphic novel Lovecraft, about the life of writer H. P. Lovecraft written by Hans Rodionoff, for DC comics' Vertigo imprint. In 2005, he became the head artist for the Vertigo series Swamp Thing, drawing 22 issues till 2007. In 2012, he won a Konex Award from Argentina.

Breccia currently lives in Spoleto, Italy, and is working on the second volume of the comic book saga Sentinelles for the French market, written by Xavier Dorison.
