= Arturo del Castillo =

Argentinian comics artist

Arturo Del Castillo
- Areas: Writer, artist
- Notable works: Randall: the Killer, The Three Musketeers, The Man in the Iron Mask, Ringo, Dan Dakota - Lone Gun, Garret, Ralph Kendall, Larrigan

Arturo Pérez Del Castillo (1925–1992) was a comic book artist.

Del Castillo was born in Concepcion, Chile, but moved to Buenos Aires, Argentina in 1948. In the 1950s he worked for Aventuras, Intervalo, El Tony and Hora Cero, where he created Randall: the Killer series, scripted by Hector Oesterheld. Del Castillo adapted the novels of Alexandre Dumas and drew Western strips for Fleetway and Cowboy Picture Library. His works were reprinted in Argentina, Italy, Spain, the Netherlands, Yugoslavia etc.
