= Mario Faustinelli =

Italian comic book artist and editor (1924–2006)

Mario Faustinelli (8 November 1924 – 31 July 2006) was an Italian comic book artist and editor.

Faustinelli was born in Venice in 1924. After the end of World War II, Faustinelli, along with artists Hugo Pratt, Ivo Pavone, and Dino Battaglia, moved to Argentina in search of work; they became known as the "Venice Group." In 1945 Faustinelli, along with Pratt and Alberto Ongaro, created the character "Asso di Picche" ("Ace of Spades"). Faustinelli later became the editor of Asso di Picche magazine, and continued to write the series.

Faustinelli returned to Italy in 1957. He co-write the script for the 1961 film, The Adventures of Topo Gigio.

In 1964 he created the character and comic strip Kolosso with artist Carlo Cossio. Kolosso is a likeable, muscular giant who is sent in different ages, through a time machine used by his opponent. He is often accompanied by the weak but intelligent Ferruccio. Other artists who have worked on Kolosso are Franco Paludetti, Antonio Canale and Carlo Porciani. In 2004 a new series of Kolosso stories was published by Editrice If.

Faustinelli died in Milan after a long illness.
