= Sergeant Kirk =

Comics character

El Sargento Kirk on the front page of Misterix no. 345 (1955)

Sergeant Kirk or Sgt. Kirk (Spanish: El Sargento Kirk) is the main character of the Western comics series of the same title by Italian comic book creator Hugo Pratt and Argentine author Héctor Germán Oesterheld.

== Publication history ==
The series, created in Argentina during the Golden Age of Argentine Comics, was first published in issue 225 of the weekly comics magazine Misterix on January 9, 1953. The idea was to make Western comics with Hugo Pratt, a rising star at the moment. Oesterheld initially tried to make a Sergeant set in the times of colonial Argentina, but it was rejected as it would not be profitable. Seeking documentation about the history of the United States' relation with the native Americans he read about the Wounded Knee Massacre, and used it as a starting point for his stories. Similarly to revisionist Western, he tried to avoid the standard portrayal of the cowboy as a flawless hero, and made him instead a man trying to make amends for the killing of natives.

Sargento Kirk continued its run in Misterix until issue 475 on December 20, 1957, when Oesterheld's own publishing house Editorial Frontera was established, and the series resumed in the Frontera magazines Frontera Extra and Hora Cero Suplemento Semanal. It ran until 1961 with drawings by Pratt, Jorge Moliterni, Horacio Porreca and Gisela Dexter. An additional Sargento Kirk story was published in 1973 in the magazine Billiken, drawn by Gustavo Trigo.

== Synopsis ==
Sergeant Kirk is a former soldier of the American Civil War who goes on to serve in the post-war Wild West. Forced to participate in a massacre of American Indians by the U.S. Army, Kirk deserts and devotes himself to defending the Indians. An essentially noble man, Kirk treats even his enemies with tolerance and humanitarianism. Among Kirk's companions appearing in the series are "El Corto", Dr. Forbes and the Native American boy, Maha.

== Magazine ==
Sergeant Kirk (Italian: Il Sergente Kirk) was chosen as the name of the comics magazine Pratt launched in Italy in July 1967 by publisher Florenzo Ivaldi (Ivaldi Editore). This carried showcased work from the Argentine period, as well as the series Luck Star O'Hara, Gli Scorpioni del Deserto, and the first publication of Corto Maltese in the story Una Ballata del Mare Salato. The magazine maintained regular distribution until December 1969 and was issued sporadically during the 1970s.

== Sources ==
- Sgt. Kirk publications, Misterix publications Archivespratt
- Sgt. Kirk magazine dossier FFF (in Italian)
