= Hugo Pratt =

Italian comic book artist (1927–1995)

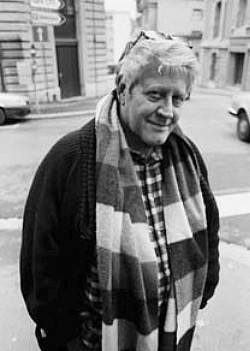
- Pratt in 1989
- Born: Ugo Eugenio Prat; 15 June 1927 Rimini, Kingdom of Italy
- Died: 20 August 1995 (aged 68) Pully, Switzerland
- Areas: Writer; artist
- Notable works: Corto Maltese; Gli scorpioni del deserto; Jesuit Joe
- Awards: Full list

Ugo Eugenio Prat (15 June 1927 – 20 August 1995), better known as Hugo Pratt, was an Italian comic book creator who was known for combining strong storytelling with extensive historical research on works such as Corto Maltese. He was inducted into the Will Eisner Award Hall of Fame in 2005, and was awarded the 15th anniversary special Grand Prix de la ville d'Angoulême at the Angoulême Festival. In 1946 Hugo Pratt became part of the so-called Group of Venice with Fernando Carcupino, Dino Battaglia and Damiano Damiani.

== Biography ==
=== Early years ===
Born in Rimini, Italy, to Rolando Prat and Evelina (Genero) Prat, Ugo Eugenio Prat spent much of his childhood in Venice in a very cosmopolitan family environment. His paternal grandfather Joseph was a Catholic of English and French descent, while his maternal grandfather was of Jewish descent and his grandmother of Turkish descent. In 1937, Pratt moved with his mother to Italian East Africa, joining his father who had moved there following the Second Italo-Ethiopian War. Pratt's father, a non-commissioned officer in the Blackshirts, was captured in 1941 by British troops and in late 1942 died from disease as a prisoner of war. In the same year, Pratt and his mother were interned in an Allied prison camp at Dirédaoua, where he would buy comics from camp guards, and later was sent back to Italy by the Red Cross.

After the war, Pratt moved to Venice where he organized entertainment for Allied troops. Later Pratt joined the Venice Group with other Italian cartoonists, including Alberto Ongaro, Gian Carlo Guarda and Mario Faustinelli. Their magazine Asso di Picche, launched in 1945 as Albo Uragano, concentrated on adventure comics. The magazine scored some success and published works by young talents, including Dino Battaglia. His eponymous character Asso di Picche (Ace of Spades) was a success, mainly in Argentina, where Pratt was invited in 1949.

=== Argentine years ===
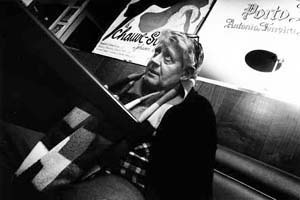
Pratt in 1989

In the late 1940s he moved to Buenos Aires, where he worked for Argentine publisher Editorial Abril and met Argentine comics artists such as Alberto Breccia and Solano López. The passage to Editorial Frontera saw the publication of some of his most important early series. These included Sergeant Kirk and Ernie Pike, written by Héctor Germán Oesterheld.

Pratt taught drawing in the Escuela Panamericana de Arte directed by Enrique Lipszyc. He often travelled to South American destinations such as the Amazon and Mato Grosso. During that period he produced his first comic book as a complete author, both writing and illustrating Anna nella giungla (Ann of the Jungle), which was followed by the similar Capitan Cormorant and Wheeling. The latter was completed after his return to Italy.

=== Return to Italy and the creation of Corto Maltese ===
Cover of Italian publication Una ballata del mare salato

From the summer of 1959 to the summer of 1960, Pratt lived in London where he drew a series of war comics for Fleetway Publications, with British scriptwriters. He then returned to Argentina, despite the harsh economic times there. From there, he moved again to Italy in 1962 where he started a collaboration with the children's comic book magazine Corriere dei Piccoli, for which he adapted several classics of adventure literature, including Treasure Island and Kidnapped by Robert Louis Stevenson.

In 1967, Pratt met Florenzo Ivaldi; the two created a comics magazine named after his character, Sergeant Kirk, the hero first written by Héctor Oesterheld. Pratt's most famous story, Una ballata del mare salato (A Ballad of the Salty Sea), is published in the first issue and introduced his best-known character, Corto Maltese.

Corto's series continued three years later in the French magazine Pif Gadget. Due to his rather mixed family ancestry, Pratt had learned snippets of things such as kabbalism and much history. Many of his stories are placed in real historical eras and deal with real events: the 1755 war between French and British colonists in Ticonderoga, colonial wars in Africa and both world wars, for example. Pratt did exhaustive research for factual and visual details, and some characters are real historical figures or loosely based on them, such as Corto's main friend/enemy, Rasputin. Many of the minor characters cross over into other stories in a way that places all of Pratt’s stories into the same continuum.

Pratt's main series in the second part of his career include Gli scorpioni del deserto (five stories) and Jesuit Joe. He also wrote stories for his friend and pupil Milo Manara for Tutto ricominciò con un'estate indiana and El Gaucho.

=== Later years ===
From 1970 to 1984, Pratt lived mainly in France where Corto Maltese, a psychologically very complex character resulting from the travel experiences and the endless inventive capacity of his author, became the main character of a comics series. Initially published from 1970 to 1973 by the magazine Pif Gadget, it brought him much popular and critical success. Later published in album format, this series was eventually translated into fifteen languages. From 1984 he lived in Grandvaux, Switzerland in a house near Lake Geneva, where the international success that Corto Maltese sparked continued to grow. In France, most of his pre-Corto Maltese works were published in several album editions by publishers such as Casterman, Dargaud, and Les Humanoïdes Associés. A wanderer by nature, Hugo Pratt continued to travel from Canada to Patagonia, from Africa to the Pacific area. He died of bowel cancer on 20 August 1995. He was buried at the gates of Grandvaux.

Pratt cited authors such as Robert Louis Stevenson, James Oliver Curwood, Zane Grey, Kenneth Roberts, Henry De Vere Stacpoole, Joseph Conrad, Fenimore Cooper, Herman Melville and Jack London as influences, along with cartoonists Lyman Young, Will Eisner, and especially Milton Caniff.

On Friday, 15 July 2005, at San Diego Comic-Con's 17th Annual Will Eisner Comic Industry Awards, he was one of four professionals that year inducted into the Comic Book Hall of Fame.

One of the series created by Pratt, entitled "The Scorpions of the Desert" in English, has been continued after Pratt's death. In 2005 a sixth volume in this series was released, drawn by Pierre Wazeem and entitled "Le chemin de fièvre". A seventh album was scheduled by the French publishers Casterman for release in March 2008. Casterman have also on several occasions hinted at the possible future release of a further episode in the Corto Maltese saga.

In 2015, IDW Publishing's EuroComics imprint launched the definitive English-language edition of Corto Maltese, with new translations made from Pratt's original Italian scripts.

== Documentaries ==
Swiss director Stefano Knuchel started a trilogy of documentaries about Pratt, releasing Hugo en Afrique in 2009, followed by Hugo in Argentina in 2021. In 2022, Knuchel announced working on the third part of the trilogy, Hugo in Venice.

== Awards ==
- 1969: Gran Guinigi per il disegnatore italiano (award for an Italian artist) at the Lucca Comics & Games, for Una ballata del mare salato
- 1974: Prix Saint-Michel, for the best realistic story
- 1976: Angoulême Festival, Best foreign realistic comic book, for La ballade de la mer salée
- 1981: Angoulême Festival, Elle award
- 1987: Angoulême Festival, Best foreign comic book, for Indian Summer
- 1988: Angoulême Festival, 15th anniversary special Grand Prix de la ville d'Angoulême
- 1994: International Cartoonists Exhibition, U Giancu's Prize
- 1996: Max & Moritz Prizes, Germany, Best German language comic import, for Saint-Exupéry - le dernier vol
- 2005: inducted into the Will Eisner Award Hall of Fame

== Main works ==
- Asso di Picche (L'As de pique, Ace of Spades, 1945–1949)
- El Sargento Kirk (Sergeant Kirk, 1953–1959), written by Héctor Oesterheld
- Ticonderoga (1957–1958), written by Héctor Oesterheld
- Ernie Pike (1957–1959), written by Héctor Oesterheld
- Ann y Dan (Anna nella giungla, Ann of the Jungle, Ann de la jungle, 1959)
- Capitan Cormorant (1962)
- Wheeling (1962)
- Corto Maltese (1967–1992)
  - Una ballata del mare salato (1967) - translated into English as Ballad of The Salt Sea (Harvill Press 1996)
  - Il segreto di Tristan Bantam (1970)
  - Corto toujours un peu plus loin - partly translated into English as The Banana Conga (1970-1971)
  - Le Celtiche (1972) - translated into English as The Celts, (Harvill Press 1996) and A Mid-Winter Morning's Dream (1971–1972)
  - Le Etiopiche (1972–1973)
  - Corte Sconta detta Arcana (1974)
  - Favola di Venezia (1976)
  - La casa dorata di Samarcanda (1980)
  - La giovinezza (1981)
  - Tango (1985)
  - Le elvetiche "Rosa Alchemica" (1987)
  - Mu (1988)
- Gli scorpioni del deserto - Les Scorpions du Desert, The Scorpions of the Desert (1969–92)
  - Les Scorpions du désert (Episode 1, 1969–73)
  - Piccolo chalet... (1975)
  - Vanghe Dancale (1980)
  - Dry Martini Parlor (1982)
  - Brise de mer (1992)
- L'uomo dei Caraibi (1977)
- L'uomo del Sertao (1977)
- L'uomo della Somalia (1979)
- L'uomo del gran nord - Jesuit Joe (1980)
- Tutto ricominciò con un'estate indiana (Indian Summer, 1983, with Milo Manara)
- Cato Zulu (1984–88)
- El Gaucho (1991), with Milo Manara
- Saint-Exupéry - le dernier vol (1994)
- Morgan (1995)

== See also ==
- Italian comics
- Letteratura disegnata

== Sources ==
- Hugo Pratt dossier FFF (in Italian)
- Hugo Pratt publications in Pif Archived 2007-02-21 at the Wayback Machine, (A SUIVRE), Pilote Archived 2007-02-21 at the Wayback Machine and Le journal de Tintin Archived 2007-02-21 at the Wayback Machine BDoubliées (in French)
