= The Eternaut =

1957–1959 Argentine comic strip

- Cover of the 2015 edition, published by Fantagraphics

Publication information
- Publisher: Editorial Frontera
- Genre: Post-apocalyptic
- Publication date: 1957 – 1959

Creative team
- Written by: Héctor Germán Oesterheld
- Penciller: Francisco Solano López

The Eternaut (Spanish: El Eternauta) is an Argentine science fiction comic created by Héctor Germán Oesterheld with artwork by Francisco Solano López. It was first published in Hora Cero Semanal between 1957 and 1959, initially as a serialized comic strip. The story is focused on a handful of survivors of a deadly alien invasion in Buenos Aires.

After other failed attempts to continue the story, Oesterheld remade it in 1969, with art by Alberto Breccia and a more overt political tone. Oesterheld became the spokesman of the Montoneros guerrillas by the time he started the sequel, El Eternauta: segunda parte, again with Solano López. The Dirty War against guerrilla groups forced Oesterheld to go into hiding, but he completed the story nonetheless. He was a victim of an enforced disappearance shortly after that. His widow Elsa Oesterheld sold the rights of the character to the publisher Ediciones Record, and tried later to annul the contract, leading to a lengthy copyright dispute.

The story had many sequels in later years, sometimes with conflicting canonicity. A television miniseries adaptation by Netflix, The Eternaut, premiered on April 30, 2025, starring Ricardo Darín as the lead character.

== Publication history ==
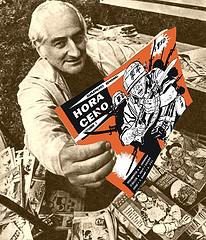
Héctor Germán Oesterheld with the magazine Hora Cero

The Eternauta was first published in the first issue of the comic magazine anthology Hora Cero by Editorial Frontera, on September 4, 1957. It was written by Héctor Germán Oesterheld, author of all the comics in the anthology, and was illustrated by Francisco Solano López. Solano López had been working with Oesterheld on the comic Rolo, el marciano adoptivo (lit. 'Rolo, the adopted Martian'), and although he was still interested in science fiction, he asked for a story with less fantasy. "I was doing Rolo in Hora Cero, I wanted to do science fiction, but with a more realistic approach, something more committed, closer to the reader, and that gave Héctor the idea of the Eternaut". Oesterheld would explain that "The Eternaut started as a short story, just 70 panels. Then it turned into a long story, an adaptation of sorts of the topic of Robinson Crusoe. I was captivated by the idea of a family that is suddenly alone in the world, surrounded by death and by an unknown and unreachable enemy. I thought of myself, of my family, isolated in our chalet, and started asking questions". He also explained that, although there was a general outline, the plots were largely improvised during publication, which led to the creation of characters and situations that were not considered in the early stages of writing.

The series became a success, and ran until 1959. However, Solano López said that, although the magazine was selling well, they had no way to measure the popularity of each specific comic, and were not aware of the Eternaut's popularity at the time. Hora Cero was closed shortly after the story's conclusion, as artists found it more lucrative to work abroad than in Frontera, Oesterheld knew little of finances, and interest in serial comics declined. Editorial Frontera was then absorbed by Editorial Emilio Ramírez. The closure of Frontera and the emigration of Solano López to Europe forced Oesterheld to cancel his plans for a sequel. Emilio Ramírez then sold the titles to the magazine "Vea y lea" in 1961, which republished the story. The republication made slight changes to the originals, removing the opening panels and some closing panels whose texts were redundant with the texts of the following entry, to allow a smoother read. Oesterheld wrote the plots intended for the sequel as a novel, which was published by Emilio Ramírez.

In 1969, Oesterheld rebooted the series as The Eternaut 1969, with more political references. It became an open critique of dictatorial regimes and advanced anti-imperialist ideas: instead of a classic alien invasion that destroys all the world, the story states that the global powers abandoned Latin America to the invaders to guarantee their own survival. This version featured artwork by Alberto Breccia, who drew the story in an experimental and unique style diverging from the original expression. It was first published on May 29, 1969, in the weekly Gente. The story was cancelled, so the ending was rushed to avoid leaving it unfinished. The following years the series was also published in Europe. These publications were a success and made Oesterheld, Breccia, and the character known in Europe.

Oesterheld met Lito Fernández in the early 1970s and invited him to work on a sequel set in La Plata. The basic plot would have been about the aliens starting a new invasion elsewhere after their defeat in Buenos Aires, using La Plata as a beachhead from where to raise a counter-attack. The comic would have been published by El Día. Oesterheld and Fernández gathered information about the city, and flew in a helicopter above it to take photos and brainstorm ideas. However, the project was never published and the few unpublished pages made for it were destroyed years later.

In December 1975, Ediciones Record started a sequel in Skorpio, by Ediciones Record, titles El Eternauta: segunda parte. Oesterheld resumed the story, with artwork once again by Solano López. Solano López had returned to Argentina, seeking to retrieve his original artworks from Emilio Ramírez. Oesterheld joined the leftist organization Montoneros and became their spokesman, and went into hiding when the organization was banned during the Dirty War. To keep writing the comic he delivered the plots in secrecy or using intermediaries. Solano López only saw him in person a couple of times. The plot of the comic was in line with the political agenda of Montoneros. Oesterheld, who had introduced himself as a character in a brief cameo at the beginning and end of the original story, now upgraded his self-character to an active sidekick of the hero, while keeping the role of narrator. Solano López did not like it because he rejected both the military government and the Montoneros, and felt that the characterization of Juan Salvo was out-of-character in relation to the first entry. Oesterheld was victim of an enforced disappearance in 1977, shortly after concluding the story. Elsa Sánchez de Oesterheld, his widow, inherited the rights over the character after his death.

A third story, El Eternauta: tercera parte, was published in 1981, after the death of Oesterheld. It was published both in Argentina in Skorpio and in Italy in L'Eternauta. Ediciones Record requested Solano López to take part in it, but he refused because of the troubling circumstances of the previous comic. He only agreed to draw a few faces in the first chapters, because of the editorial insistence. The story had no credited authors, and although it kept Oesterheld as a lead narrator character as in the 1975 story, it was written by Alberto Ongaro, with illustrations by Oswal, Mario Morhain, and Carlos Meglia. Some years later Ediciones Record found an unpublished draft of a third part of The Eternaut by Oesterheld, written in the 1970s. Alfredo Scutti, director of Ediciones Record, offered Pez, an artist from the Fierro magazine, the chance to work on it. The story featured Juan Salvo as the ruthless dictator of a post-apocalyptic Buenos Aires, until he gradually recovers his memories. It would have been published monthly, but after a brief time the work was halted and the comic was never published.

Solano López began projects to restore the character in the 1990s. His first project, when he was still living in Brazil, was with the writer Ricardo Barreiro, but was discarded when Sánchez de Oesterheld and her grandsons refused to let the writer work with the character. The second project, called "La Vencida", was a new third part that would ignore the third part published by Ediciones Record. He invited the writer Juan Sasturain to work together with his protégé Pablo Maiztegui, but Sasturain preferred to work alone. First it was offered to the newspaper Clarín, which refused it for its ideological tone. Then it was offered to the newspaper Página 12, which could not pay the intended wages to the artists. Both newspapers refused as well because The Eternaut was still a property of Ediciones Record, and wanted to avoid a lawsuit. The project was cancelled, with only two pages made.

Sánchez de Oesterheld and Solano López signed a contract with El Club del Comic to make a new story, "El mundo arrepentido". The story was written by Pablo Maiztegui and was set within the interdimensional travels mentioned by the lead character at the end of the first story. It was the first one made in color. Comic Press, owned by Ediciones Record, also started a comic book, "Odio Cósmico", closer to the style of American comic books, with plots of Ricardo Barreiro. The death of Barreiro and the legal complaints of Sánchez de Oesterheld and Solano López, who did not authorize the comic, led to its cancellation after 3 issues.

In 2015, Fantagraphics Books published the first translation of the work into English, under the title The Eternaut. It was translated by Erica Mena. The publication was nominated for the 2016 Eisner Award in the categories for Best U.S. Edition of International Material, Best Publication Design, and Best Archival Collection/Project—Strips. It received the award in the last category.

=== Copyright disputes ===
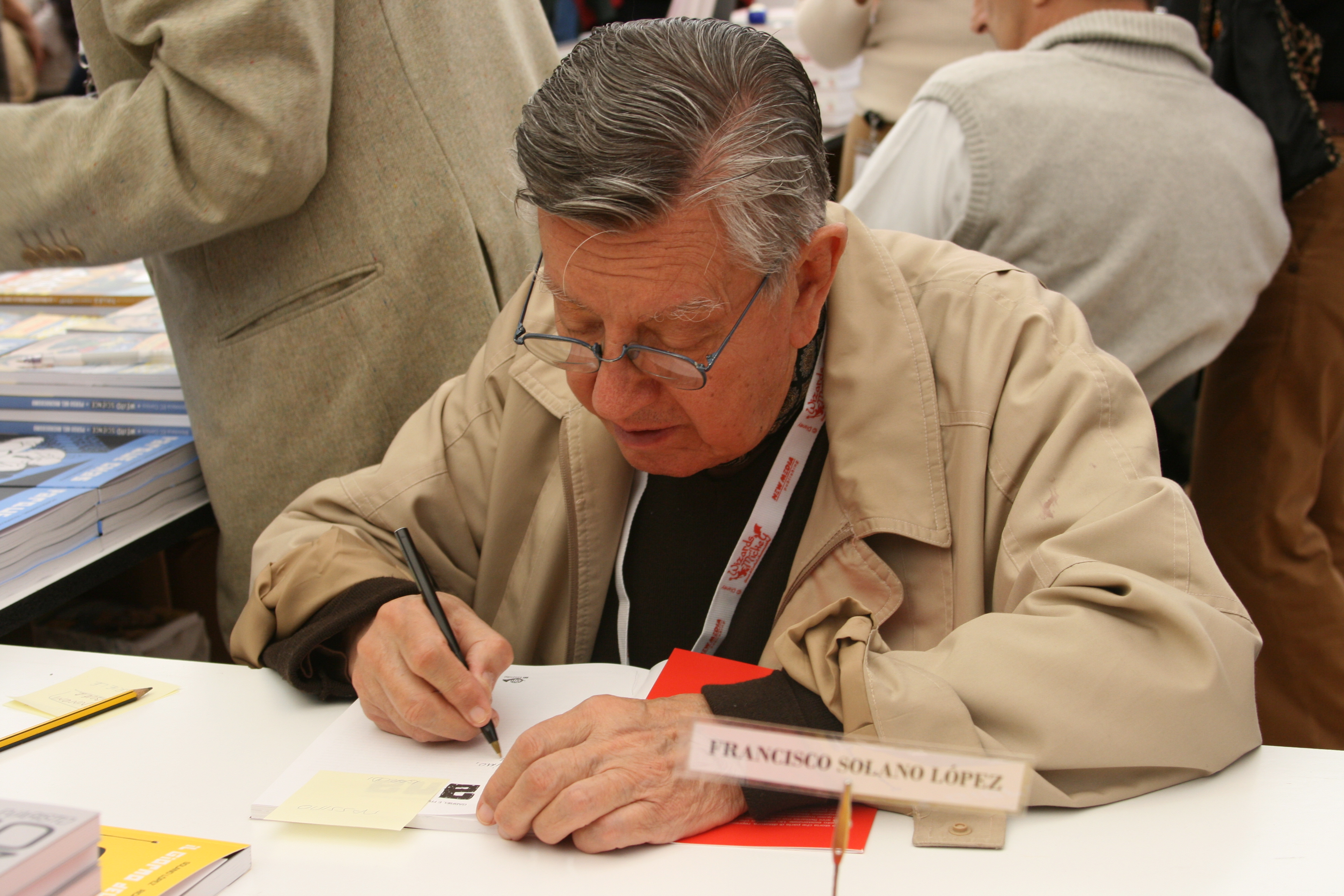
Francisco Solano López, artist of the comic

Héctor Oesterheld sold the copyright of several of his characters, including the Eternaut, when Editorial Frontera was closed. Initially those rights were acquired by Editorial Emilio Ramírez, who then sold them to others. Alfredo Scutti from Ediciones Record acquired the rights in the 1970s and republished the story in 1976. Oesterheld and Solano López signed a contract with Scutti, confirming his rights over the character, in exchange for part of the money received by Ediciones Record for the republication. As it was a success, they signed a similar contract to write the sequel, "El Eternauta Segunda Parte". Oesterheld was killed by the military and Solano López left for Europe shortly after the sequel was finished. The heirs of Oesterheld were his widow Elsa Sánchez de Oesterheld and his grandchildren, still minors.

The series was a success in Italy and there were rumors of a possible film adaptation. To secure his rights Scutti signed a more detailed contract with Sánchez de Oesterheld. She was facing a difficult economic situation, coupled with the still recent loss of her husband and her imminent retirement, and accepted. She signed the contract for a sum of 10,000 dollars. Later she started a judicial case to annul the contract, as she felt that she had made a mistake and had not understood what she was doing. Her lawyer said that she did not have the legal rights to sell the rights to the character, as she had ignored the rights of Oesterheld's grandchildren. Scutti based his defense on the contracts signed with Héctor while he was still alive, earlier than the one with Sánchez de Oesterheld, and considered that she was mixing commercial deals with personal tragedies. He also provided documentation proving that she authorized the making of the third sequel for another payment.

Solano López also complained about the contract, claiming that it ignored his own rights over the character. When he left for Europe, knowing of Sánchez de Oesterheld's economic problems, he told her that he gave her full leeway to profit from the character the way she saw fit. He clarified later that he never meant to renounce his share of the copyright over the character, and that it was only a verbal proposal with no legal weight. He pointed out that the document made between Ediciones Record and Sánchez de Oesterheld described The Eternaut as a literary work, created solely by Héctor Oesterheld, with no mention of him. And, although Oesterheld would write a literary novel about the character later, it was born as a comic book character, with a joint work of the writer and the artist. Sánchez de Oesterheld did not agree with that view and considered Solano López a mere interpreter of the work of her husband. She also said that The Eternaut was an idea that Oesterheld had for some years before he started working on it. The comic El mundo arrepentido, made by Solano López and Pol, was also initially a source of conflict. Oesterheld's grandsons said that new projects involving the character, such as sequels, merchandising, or adaptations, had to have the approval of Solano López, but that he did not have the right to decide such things completely by himself. Both parties eventually agreed to work together on the new release.

The judiciary ruled in 1996 that the sale of the characters of Oesterheld to Emilio Ramírez was null and void, restoring them to Oesterheld's heirs. Ediciones Record started their own case, stating that they owned the rights to the franchise. Although initially the lower courts ruled favorably to Ediciones Record, in 2018 the Supreme Court ruled favorably to the heirs of Oesterheld and closed the case, with the vote of Ricardo Lorenzetti, Elena Highton de Nolasco, Juan Carlos Maqueda, Horacio Rosatti and Carlos Rosenkrantz.

== Series ==
| Name | Year | Writer | Artist | Publisher |
|---|---|---|---|---|
| The Eternaut | 1957 | Héctor Germán Oesterheld | Francisco Solano López | Editorial Frontera |
| The Eternaut 1969 | 1969 | Héctor Germán Oesterheld | Alberto Breccia | Gente y la actualidad |
| El Eternauta: segunda parte | 1976 | Héctor Germán Oesterheld | Francisco Solano López | Ediciones Record |
| El Eternauta: tercera parte | 1981 | Alberto Ongaro | Mario Morhain and Oswal | Ediciones Record |
| El Eternauta, el mundo arrepentido | 1997 | Pablo Maiztegui | Francisco Solano López | Club del Cómic |
| El Eternauta: Odio cósmico | 1999 | Pablo Muñoz, Ricardo Barreiro | Walther Taborda and Gabriel Rearte | Comic Press |
| El Eternauta, el regreso | 2003 | Pablo Maiztegui | Francisco Solano López | Club del Cómic |

== Plot ==
Oesterheld, the author of the comic, appears as a character at the beginning of the story. He is writing late at night when a man suddenly appears out of thin air in his room. He introduces himself as Juan Salvo, and narrates his story. All the comic is thus narrated by Salvo, in first-person narrative. Salvo lived with his wife Elena and his daughter Martita. According to Salvo, mysterious deadly snowfall suddenly covers Buenos Aires and his neighborhood in the nearby Vicente López, wiping out all life upon touch. Salvo and his family survive because his home was completely closed. At the time of the snowfall, he was playing truco with his friends, Favalli, Lucas, and Polski. Polski tries to return to his home, worried about his family, and dies moments after leaving, having come into contact with the snowflakes. The others prepare insulated suits to be able to leave the house and gather supplies. A young child, Pablo, joins them, and a deranged survivor kills Lucas. Realizing that the catastrophe generated a violent state of anarchy, they try to escape from Buenos Aires, but before doing so they are recruited by an improvised army. Salvo, Favalli, and Pablo join them, while Elena and Martita stay home.

It turns out that the snowfall was part of an ongoing alien invasion. The army first attacks a group of giant insects similar to beetles, armed with giant lightthrowers, at the General Paz highway. All beetles have devices on their necks that reveal that the real invaders control them from afar. The army sets its base inside the River Plate stadium, as its enormous walls could serve as a trench against the lightthrowers. Salvo and Franco, a metal worker recruited by the army, leave the stadium during the night to gather intelligence. They discover that the beetles are controlled by an alien known as "Hand", because of their hands with several fingers. The "Hand" also controls other survivors turned into automatons by a similar device. The alien is in turn also controlled by aliens that he does not name; later referred to as just "Them". The army is then lured into a trap at Plaza Italia. They are decimated by giant beasts known as "Gurbos", and only Salvo, Favalli and Franco survive. They seek further intelligence and find the main invasion force at the Plaza del Congreso. They blow up the dome with "Them" and escape; they find Pablo and the historian Mosca, who survived the attack at Plaza Italia but got separated from them. They leave just before a nuke fired by foreign countries against the invaders destroys Buenos Aires.

The aliens continue the invasion and lure the pockets of survivors to fake "snow-free zones". Favalli, Pablo and Mosca allow themselves to be captured and turned into automatons so that Salvo and his family can escape. They seize a spaceship and Salvo accidentally turns on a time machine while randomly pressing buttons. He ends up in a pocket universe, with Elena and Martita stranded somewhere else. He eventually learns to travel between universes and timelines, which is why he appeared at Oesterheld's house. After finishing his narration Salvo realizes that he is in Buenos Aires, only a few years before the invasion. He runs back home, reunites with his family in a stable time loop, and forgets about it all. Oesterheld, unable to do anything else about the future invasion, decides to write a comic about it.

== Reception ==
The original comic book character (left) and the "Nestornauta" (right).

Martín Hadis wrote in the prologue for the Fantagraphics edition that one of the strongest points of the story for the Argentine audience was the sight of an alien invasion in Buenos Aires, with its distinctive buildings and monuments disfigured or destroyed by the alien devices or the war actions; most works of fiction about the theme are set in other countries, such as the United States. However, he also pointed out that the story has appeal beyond that, as it has been successful in Spain, Mexico, Italy, Greece, Croatia, France, etc.; where the sight of Buenos Aires would be less meaningful. He points that the scientific aspects of the alien invasion are mostly handwaved and that the story narrates a global disaster from the point of view of a small group of survivors. Hadis explains the appeal of the series in the contrast between home, family and friendship with death and the utterly alien, an appeal that would transcend localisms. Rachel Cooke from The Guardian praises the ingenuity of the characters to survive truly hopeless situations.

It has also been noted that, except for the aliens known as "Them", none of the invaders are truly evil; they are noble beings forced to carry out the orders of others. Juan Sasturain believes that Oesterheld was writing an anti-war comic, and Fernando García considers it instead an allegory of class struggle. Tom Shapira from The Comics Journal says that, adding to the frequent in-story references to Robinson Crusoe, he found the story similar to Moby-Dick, as it features a hero who is actually a witness of the acts of heroism carried out by others.

Shapira also criticized some aspects of the story, such as the presence of flying saucers that he found to make the story look dated. He also criticized the lack of relevant female characters, stating that Elena and Martita had no actual weight in the plot save as reminders for the protagonist of the family he longs for. Shapira additionally criticized what he perceived as the over-reliance on cliffhangers, while also noting that the story was initially published in serialized form, which left several cliffhangers at the moments when the original publication likely ended the chapters.

El Eternauta: primera parte was listed among the classics of Argentine literature in 2000 by Clarín. In 2009, the Congress of Argentina declared 4 September, the day of the first publication of The Eternaut, "Day of the Argentine Comic"; in 2010, the Argentine Ministry of Education ordered several thousand copies of The Eternaut to be distributed in secondary schools.

President Néstor Kirchner expressed his admiration for The Eternaut; in 2010, Kirchner ran an advertisement of himself drawn as the Eternaut in support of Cristina Kirchner's presidential campaign. The advertising, known as the "Nestornauta", was later used after the death of Néstor Kirchner a short time later. The "Nestornauta" is based upon one of the best known images of the character, used in the front cover of the 1976 reissue of the first story. The image keeps the snowflakes around the character, but removes the shotgun, as it could be associated with the violent guerrillas of the 1970s. It also changed the face of the character: besides using the face of Kirchner, it changes the grim and determined gesture of the original with a jovial and smiling face.

== Adaptations ==
=== Film and TV ===
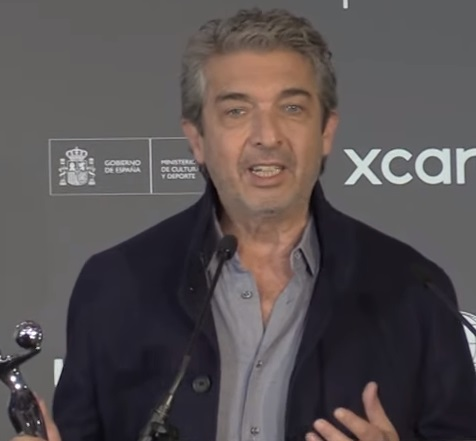
Ricardo Darín, lead actor of The Eternaut.

In 1968, advertisement production company Gil & Bertolini acquired the rights to The Eternaut to make an animated television series, to be presented at the First World Comic Book Biennial. Each episode would be introduced by Oesterheld himself, and the animation would be rotoscoped, a very expensive technique at the time. The project was cancelled after the production of a 24-minute pilot.

For the following twenty years, financial and copyrights problems prevented different adaptations of The Eternaut for film and television. Argentine directors such as Fernando "Pino" Solanas and Gustavo Mosquera expressed their interest on adapting the material, as did Adolfo Aristarain. At the time, Aristarain said that the only way to produce the film would be in English, given it would cost at least US$10–15 million and American actors would be conditional to get the necessary funds from American production companies, but "that wouldn't be the correct way" because he considered Argentine culture an integral part of The Eternaut.

In 1995, there was a miniseries project led by a TV network from Buenos Aires, with special effects in charge of computer animation company Aicon. A preliminary contract had been signed with a major Hollywood studio. In 2007, an Italian production company worked on an adaptation of The Eternaut, in agreement with Oesterheld's widow and grandsons. It entered negotiations with Argentine studios and the National Institute of Cinema and Audiovisual Arts (INCAA) for a possible co-production. In 2008, director Lucrecia Martel was invited for a film adaptation of The Eternaut. The script would have taken place in the present day, but the Oesterheld family felt it to be too different from the source material. The producers stepped down and the project went stagnant. In 2018, Spanish filmmaker Álex de la Iglesia expressed interest in making an adaptation, with actor Ricardo Darín on board to star in the project.

In February 2020, it was announced that The Eternaut would be adapted into a TV series for Netflix, The Eternaut. The series was directed by Bruno Stagnaro and is contextualized in the 2020s. Ricardo Darín stars as the main character, with the cast consisting of Carla Peterson, Marcelo Subiotto, César Troncoso, Andrea Pietra and Ariel Staltari.

=== Theater ===
Jorge Claudio Morhain wrote El viajero de Eternidad (The Traveler of Eternity), a stage play in three acts published in 2003 in book format. It was performed in 2007 as part of the homages of the 30th anniversary of Oesterheld's disappearance.

Another theater adaptation entitled Zona liberada, an experimental play, premiered in Buenos Aires in 2007 . It was created and performed by the group Carne de Cañón and casts the comic's themes and imagery into a contemporary context. The production had the blessing of Elsa Oesterheld and Solano López

=== Music ===
Mexican alternative rock band Novo Pilota from Ciudad Juárez created a concept album called E.T.E.R.N.A.U.T.A. (2010), which is rife with lyrical and thematic references to El Eternauta, drawing parallels between the comic's besieged Buenos Aires and the violence afflicting Ciudad Juárez.

In 2011, a multi-artist musical tribute was organized in La Plata entitled "Los Ellos,” after the alien invaders in the comic, which resulted in a compilation album featuring songs by several different bands inspired by scenes and themes from the comic.

Argentine rock band Fútbol included a track entitled “El asedio de River Plate” on their 2011 album La Gallina, directly alluding to the Eternauta's climactic battle at River Plate Stadium.

In 2013 Juan Maicas composed "Zamba para Juan Salvo" named after the protagonist from "El Eternauta." It follows the traditional zamba style but its lyrics are based on the comic.

in 2018 the Argentine space-rock band La Chatarra Espacial released the album "Batalla del Tiempo" (“Battle of Time”), whose title track's lyrics explicitly cite El Eternauta.
