= Hora Cero =

Argentine comics magazine (1957–1963)

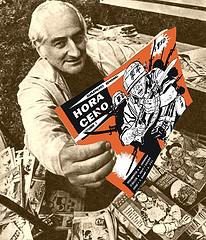
Héctor Germán Oesterheld with various issues of Hora Cero.

Hora Cero was an Argentine comics anthology magazine which ran between 1957 and 1963. The magazine was established by Héctor Germán Oesterheld and his brother in 1957. The publisher was Editorial Frontera. It was part of the Golden Age of Argentine Comics. The most successful of its published series was El Eternauta. The final issue of Hora Cero appeared in 1963.
