= Vida del Che =

1968 graphic novel

Publication information
- Publisher: Editorial Jorge Álvarez
- Publication date: January 1968
- No. of issues: 1
- Main character(s): Che Guevara

Creative team
- Created by: Héctor Germán Oesterheld; Alberto Breccia
- Written by: Héctor Germán Oesterheld
- Artist(s): Alberto Breccia; Enrique Breccia
- Penciller(s): Alberto Breccia; Enrique Breccia
- Inker(s): Alberto Breccia; Enrique Breccia

Vida del Che (transl. Life of Che) is an Argentine biographical graphic novel written by Héctor Germán Oesterheld and illustrated by Alberto Breccia and Enrique Breccia. The Historieta (comic book) narrates the life of the revolutionary Che Guevara from his childhood to his assassination in Bolivia. It was originally published as a book in Argentina in 1968, only three months after Che Guevara's death. The illustrator Enrique Breccia, son of Alberto and equally famous in the field of the illustration, participated in the final stretch of the artwork, which was also his first comic.

Vida del Che was immediately banned after its publication by the ruling military dictatorship at the time, self-styled as "Argentine Revolution" (1966–1973); the whole edition was seized and destroyed by the dictatorship. Nevertheless, the original drawings were saved and hidden by Enrique Breccia, and it was finally republished in 2008.

== Publication history ==
The haste with which Vida del Che was originally made and published meant at the time that its original version contained several errors, which were repeated when the comic was recovered in 1987, on an edition by the publishing house Ikusager. Some of those mistakes were corrected in the Argentine edition by Imaginador (in 1997), but the brand new anniversary edition of Doedytores in 2008 is considered as the most definitive edition.

Many of the errors in the first edition are of names and historical facts, but the first and most famous of all, according to Fernando Ariel García, is one that Alberto Breccia recognized in the documentary film Breccia x cuatro (1988, directed by Julio Cardoso and Marcelo Schapces); in the film Breccia said: "I remember I left a blank box [in one of the comic's panels] because I had to paste over Che's birth certificate and it did not arrive in time, and everyone thought they saw that as a genius idea from me". In the 2008 definitive version, on the first plate of the second chapter ("Ernestito"), the birth certificate of Che Guevara was finally published as intended, forty years later.
