= Héctor Germán Oesterheld =

Argentine journalist and novelist

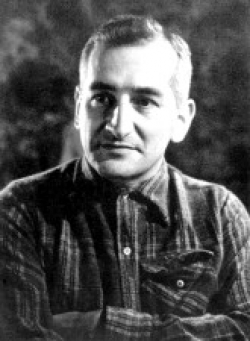
- Oesterheld in 1957
- Born: 23 July 1919 Buenos Aires, Argentina
- Died: 1977 or 1978 (aged 58) Buenos Aires Province, Argentina (presumed)
- Areas: Writer; editor; journalist; geologist
- Pseudonyms: HGO; H. Sturgiss; C. de la Vega; Francisco G. Vázquez; Germán Sturgiss; Héctor Sánchez Puyol; Joe Trigger; Patrick Hanson
- Notable works: El Sargento Kirk; Ernie Pike; El Eternauta; Mort Cinder; Vida del Che
- Spouse: Elsa Sánchez (m. 1948)
- Children: 4

Signature
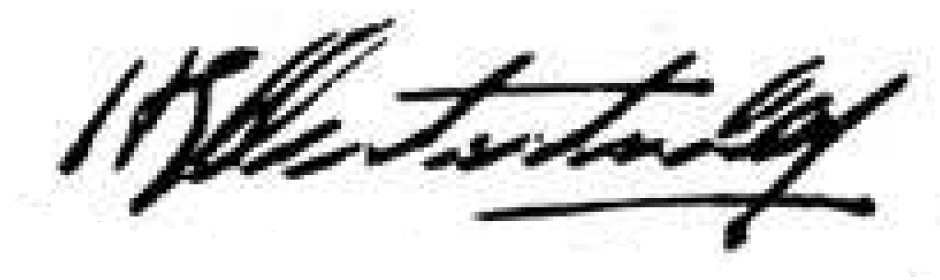

Héctor Germán Oesterheld (/ˈɒstərhɛld/ OST-ər-held; Spanish: [ˈeɣtoɾ xeɾˈman oˈesteɾxel]; born 23 July 1919; disappeared and presumed dead 1977), also known by the common abbreviation HGO, was an Argentine journalist, comics editor and writer of graphic novels and comics. He is widely celebrated as a master in his field and as one of the pioneering artists in modern Argentine comics.

Through his comics, Oesterheld criticized the numerous military dictatorships that beleaguered the country in different periods ranging from 1955 to 1983, as well as different facets of colonialism and imperialism, choosing a subtle criticism in his early comics during the 1950s and early 1960s, and a stronger and direct approach in his later work, after the execution of Che Guevara in 1967, and onwards from then on: in 1968 he wrote a biographical comic book of Che Guevara, which was subsequently banned and destroyed by the ruling military dictatorship self-styled as "Argentine Revolution" (1966–1973). However, it was later republished (and for the first time in complete form) in 2008.

Shortly before the start of Argentina's last military dictatorship (1976–1983), Oesterheld and his daughters had joined the Montoneros, a leftist (and former peronist) guerrilla group that immediately opposed the military junta. HGO continued to publish works in clandestine form while hidden in secret locations, but he was ultimately kidnapped and disappeared in 1977. His daughters were also arrested and disappeared, as were his sons-in-law. Only HGO's wife, Elsa Sánchez de Oesterheld, escaped the family's fate.

After democracy returned to Argentina, and over the years, Oesterheld's legacy has become vast, influencing several generations of new artists, particularly in the fields of literature and comic books, and he is usually named as one of the "fathers" of modern Argentine comics.

== Biography ==
Oesterheld was born on 23 July 1919 in Buenos Aires to Fernando Oesterheld, who was of German and Spanish ancestry, and a Spanish Basque mother, Elvira Ana Puyol. His early studies were in geology, which has been said to contribute to his acuity as a science fiction writer. He began his journalistic career in the early 1940s. His first work appeared in the daily La Prensa newspaper and then was published by Codex. He moved to Abril publishers, where he began his extensive career as a comics writer. During his student years he also began learning the constructed language Esperanto and had international correspondence in it.

Soon after, he married Elsa Sánchez. Their first daughter, Estela, was born in 1952, Diana a year later, Beatriz in 1955, and Marina in 1957.

Oesterheld was befriended by a group of postwar Italian comics writers, including Mario Faustinelli, Hugo Pratt, Ivo Pavone, and Dino Battaglia, also known as the Venice Group. Together these artists and writers became part of what is known as the "Golden Age of Argentine Comics." They merged into an international scene of artists and writers whose works were published worldwide.

In 1957 Oesterheld and his brother Jorge founded Editorial Frontera. Together they published various comic magazines, including Hora Cero Semanal (weekly), Hora Cero Mensual (monthly), and Frontera Mensual (monthly).

In 1958 he started writing El Eternauta, probably his most popular and critically acclaimed work. The strip, with artwork by Francisco Solano López, told the story of his meeting with a time traveler, who had already lived over 100 lives and has journeyed to the past to warn the protagonist of a future catastrophe. The strip was published in Hora Cero over 106 weekly episodes and was a massive success.

His publishing house closed five years later due to a combination of the economic crisis sweeping Argentina in the 1960s, foreign competition, and the exodus of Argentine comic artists to Europe. Oesterheld continued writing for other magazines such as Zig-Zag.

His work slowly acquired a greater political emphasis. His 1968 biography of Ernesto 'Che' Guevara, a year after Che's death, was removed from circulation by the government and the originals destroyed. In 1970 he wrote a biography of Evita Peron, dedicated to Che Guevara. In 1973 he published 450 Years of War Against Imperialism. During the military government of the 1970s, Oesterheld is believed to have joined, following his four daughters, a leftist guerrilla group, the Montoneros. His story El Eternauta, Part II (1976) described a futuristic Argentina under a dictatorship.

In 1977 Oesterheld disappeared. He was last recorded as seen alive in late 1977 or early 1978, the year when he was presumably murdered by the dictatorship. His family believed he was among the tens of thousands to have disappeared and been killed by the government.

His four daughters, along with their respective partners, were also abducted and either killed or remain missing to this day:

- Beatriz, by then 19 years old, was abducted by the military on June 19, 1976 in Martínez, after meeting with her mother to announce that she was leaving political activism and would begin studying medicine at university. Her body was handed to her mother several days later.
- Diana, who was 23 at the time, was abducted a month later, on August 7, 1976 in San Miguel de Tucumán. She was taken along with her one-and-a-half-year-old son, Fernando. She was pregnant at the time of her abduction, and she may have given birth in captivity. However, nothing was ever heard of her or this possible second child. Her body has never been recovered.
- Marina, by then 20, was abducted on November 27, 1976 in San Isidro, Buenos Aires Province. She was eight months pregnant, and it is believed that she, like her sister Diana, may have given birth in captivity. Her body was never located and nothing has ever been learned about the fate of her possible child.
- Estela, the eldest of the four sisters, was 25 when she was killed in a shootout in Longchamps, Argentina on December 13, 1977, along with her partner, Raúl Mórtola. The military took their bodies, which have never been found.

Out of the whole family, the only survivors were Oesterheld´s wife Elsa and two grandsons: Martín and Fernando.

Martín (born in 1974 to Estela and her partner Raúl Mórtola) was handed to Elsa by the military after his mother had been killed.

Fernando (born 1975 to Diana and her partner Raúl Araldi) was left by the military at an orphanage after the abduction of his mother. He was left there without any identifying information with the goal of erasing his identity. His paternal grandparents found out about this, rescued him and raised him themselves.

Elsa Sánchez participated in the protests of the Mothers of the Plaza de Mayo. She became one of the spokeswomen for the Grandmothers of the Plaza de Mayo, which advocates for the return of children of the "disappeared" to their birth families.

When the Italian journalist Alberto Ongaro enquired about Oesterheld's disappearance in 1979, he received the reply: "We did away with him because he wrote the most beautiful story of Ché Guevara ever done". Argentine journalist Jacobo Timmerman, in his memoir of his own captivity, Prisoner Without a Name, Cell Without a Number (1981), recalls seeing Oesterheld in 1977 across the hall in a prison. In a report to the Argentine National Commission on the Disappearance of Persons, which published its findings in 1984 entitled Nunca Más, Eduardo Arias recalls seeing Oesterheld between November 1977 and January 1978. He said the man was in terrible physical condition and at the secret detention center El Vesubio, which prisoners had sardonically named "The Sheraton".

== Legacy ==
Oesterheld worked with artists including Hugo Pratt, Alberto Breccia, Francisco Solano López, Ivo Pavone, Dino Battaglia, as well as Horacio Altuna, José Massaroli, Eugenio Zoppi, Paul Campani, Gustavo Trigo, Julio Schiaffino and others.

In 2026, Oesterheld was selected for inclusion in the Eisner Hall of Fame.

== Bibliography ==
=== Early period ===
- Alan y Crazy, artwork by Eugenio Zoppi.
- Bull Rocket, artwork by Paul Campani, Francisco Solano López, and others
- El Sargento Kirk, artwork by Hugo Pratt and others
- Ray Kitt, artwork by Hugo Pratt.
- Tarpón, artwork by Daniel Haupt.
- Uma-Uma, artwork by Francisco Solano López
- Indio Suárez, artwork by Carlos Freixas and Carlos Cruz.

=== Ediciones Frontera ===
- Ticonderoga (1957), artwork by Hugo Pratt and Gisela Dexter
- Rolo, el marciano adoptivo (1957), artwork by Francisco Solano López
- Nahuel Barros (1957), artwork by Carlos Roume
- Ernie Pike (1957), artwork by Hugo Pratt, Francisco Solano López and others
- El Eternauta, artwork by Francisco Solano López
- Cayena (1958), artwork by Daniel Haupt
- Dr. Morgue (1959), artwork by Alberto Breccia
- Buster Pike (1959), artwork by Julio Schiaffino
- Randall, artwork by Arturo del Castillo
- Lacky Piedras, artwork by Carlos Cruz
- Tipp Kenya, artwork by Carlos Roume
- Verdugo Ranch, artwork by Ivo Pavone
- Patria vieja (1958), artwork by Carlos Roume and Juan Arancio
- Hueso clavado, artwork by Ivo Pavone
- Leonero Brent, artwork by Jorge Moliterni
- Rul de luna, artwork by Francisco Solano López and Horianski
- Capitán Lázaro, artwork by Enrique Cristóbal
- Pichi, artwork by Carlos Roume
- Sherlock Time, artwork by Alberto Breccia
- Tom de la pradera, artwork by Ernesto García Seijas
- Lord Crack, artwork by Hugo Pratt, Bertolini, Moliterni and Flores
- Amapola negra, artwork by Francisco Solano López
- Joe Zonda, artwork by Francisco Solano López and Julio Schiaffino
- Pereyra, taxista (1960), artwork by Leopoldo Durañona
- Mortimer, artwork by Rubén Sosa
- Doc Carson, artwork by Carlos Vogt
- Cachas de oro (1961), artwork by Carlos Vogt
- Santos Bravo, artwork by Arancio
- Historias de la ciudad grande, artwork by Leandro Sesarego, Ángel A. Fernández and García Seijas
- Paul Neutrón (1962), artwork by Schiaffino.

=== Third period ===
- Capitán Caribe (1961), artwork by Dino Battaglia
- The Eternaut 1969, artwork by Alberto Breccia
- Mort Cinder (1962), artwork by Alberto Breccia
- León Loco (1963), artwork by García Seijas
- Herida Mortal (1963), artwork by Durañona.
- Birdman (1964), artwork by Eugenio Zoppi.
- Futureman (1964), artwork by Eugenio Zoppi.
- Lord Pampa, artwork by Francisco Solano López
- Watami, artwork by Moliterni
- Artemio, el taxista de Buenos Aires, artwork by Néstor Olivera and Pablo Zahlut
- Tres por la ley, artwork by Marchionne and José Massaroli
- Argón el justiciero, artwork awing by Vogt
- Brigada Madeleine, artwork by Sierra
- Aakón, artwork by Ángel A. Fernández and José Massaroli
- Kabul de Bengala, artwork by Horacio Altuna
- Roland el Corsario, artwork by José Luis García-López and others
- Marvo Luna, artwork by Francisco Solano López
- Russ Congo, artwork by Carlos Clement
- Loco Sexton, artwork by Arturo del Castillo
- Vida del Che (1968), artwork by Enrique and Alberto Breccia, biography of Che Guevara
- La Guerra de los Antartes (1970), artwork by León Napoo and Gustavo Trigo
- Evita, vida y obra de Eva Perón (1970), artwork by Alberto Breccia, a biography of Eva Perón
- 450 años de Guerra Contra el Imperialismo (1973), artwork by Leopoldo Durañona
- Nekrodamus (1975), artwork by Horacio Lalia
- Watami (1976), artwork by Jorge Moliterni
- El Eternauta II (1976), artwork by Francisco Solano López

== See also ==
- List of people who disappeared mysteriously: 1910–1990
