= Francisco Solano López (comics) =

Argentine artist (1928–2011)

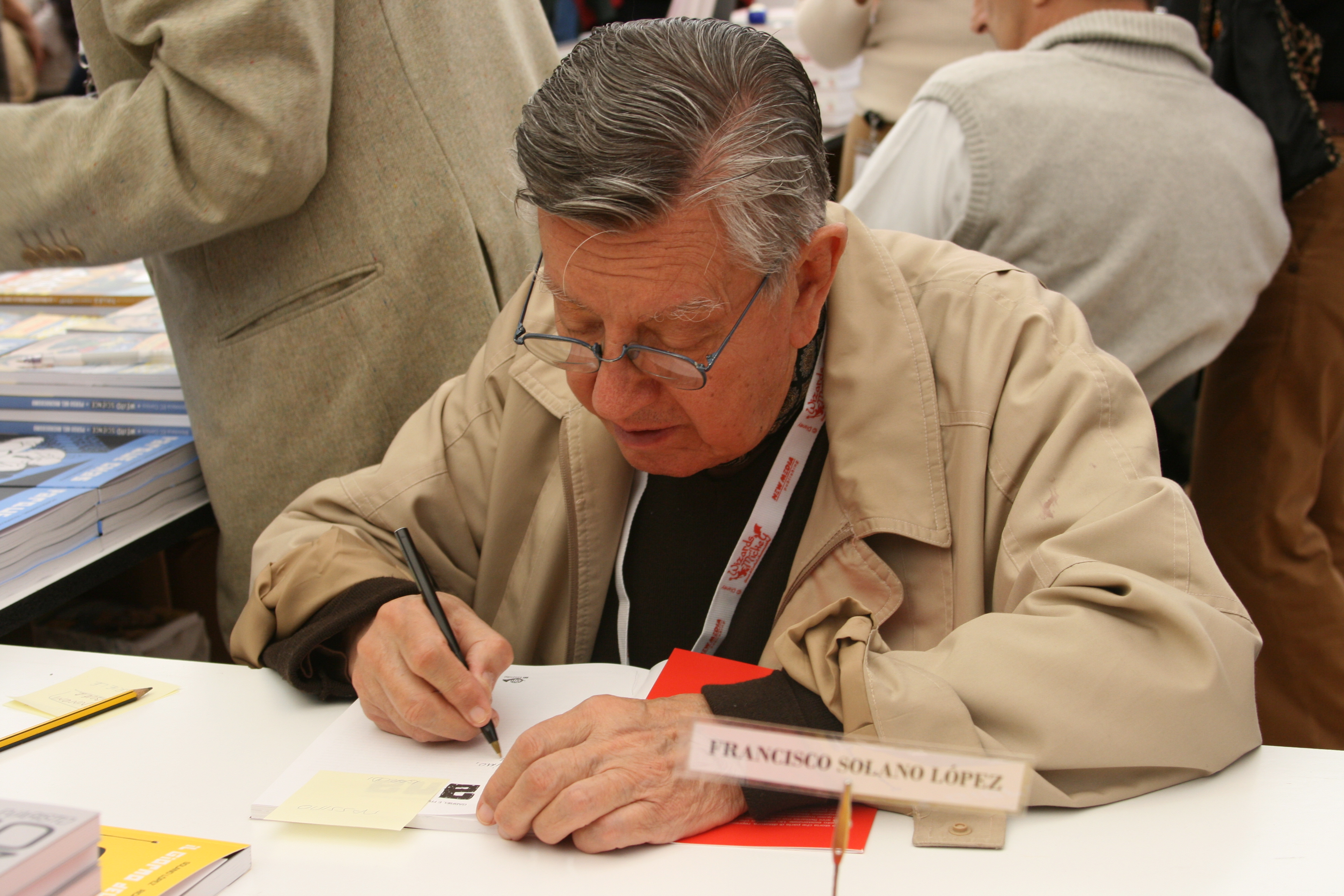
- Francisco Solano Lopez at the 2007 Lucca festival
- Born: October 26, 1928 Buenos Aires, Argentina
- Died: August 12, 2011 (aged 82) Buenos Aires, Argentina
- Area: artist
- Notable works: El Eternauta; Slot-Barr; Evaristo; Ernie Pike

Francisco Solano López (October 26, 1928 – August 12, 2011) was an Argentine comics artist. He was the co-creator of El Eternauta.

== Career ==
Born in Buenos Aires, Solano López began his career in 1953 working for the publishing house Columba where he illustrated the series Perico y Guillerma. Working for Editorial Abril he met Héctor Germán Oesterheld, assigned to illustrate his series Bull Rocket for the magazine Misterix. They collaborated on the series Pablo Maran and Uma-Uma, before joining to start Oesterheld's publishing house Editorial Frontera. For the Frontera's first publication of the monthly Hora Cero, the team produced the series Rolo el marciano adoptivo and El Héroe. López also alternated as an artist on the Ernie Pike series with Hugo Pratt, Jorge Moliterni and José Antonio Muñoz. On September 4, 1957, in the publication of Hora Cero Suplemento Semanal, the science-fiction series El Eternauta made its first appearance.

A success, El Eternauta came to the attention of the authorities as the series featured commentary of the political situation of Argentina and neighbouring Chile, prompting Solano López to flee for Spain to avoid possible arrest. In 1959 Solano López began working for Fleetway in Madrid and later London, producing artwork for a host of series, including Galaxus: The Thing from Outer Space, Pete's Pocket Army, The Drowned World, Janus Stark, and Kelly's Eye. From 1970 to 1976, Francisco Solano López also illustrated the Lion (comics) and Thunder (British comics) time travel series, Adam Eterno ( also for Fleetway Publications), and would be considered the character's definitive artist.

Having returned to Argentina, Solano López resumed collaboration with Oesterheld on El Eternauta II in 1968 with a new publishing house, Editorial Records. He also started work on science-fiction saga Slot-Barr with writer Ricardo Barreiro, and the police series Evaristo with Carlos Sampayo. In the late 1970s Solano López again fled Argentina following persecution from the authorities, and from Madrid he arranged the publication of both El Eternauta and Slot-Barr with the Italian magazines LancioStory and Skorpio.

In the 1990s, Solano López produced work in the erotic comics genre, achieving hits with El Prostíbulo del Terror, from a story by Barreiro, and Silly Symphony, made for the magazine Kiss Comix.

Solano López died on August 12, 2011, from a cerebral hemorrhage.
