= Alberto Ongaro =

Italian journalist, writer and comics artist (1925–2018)

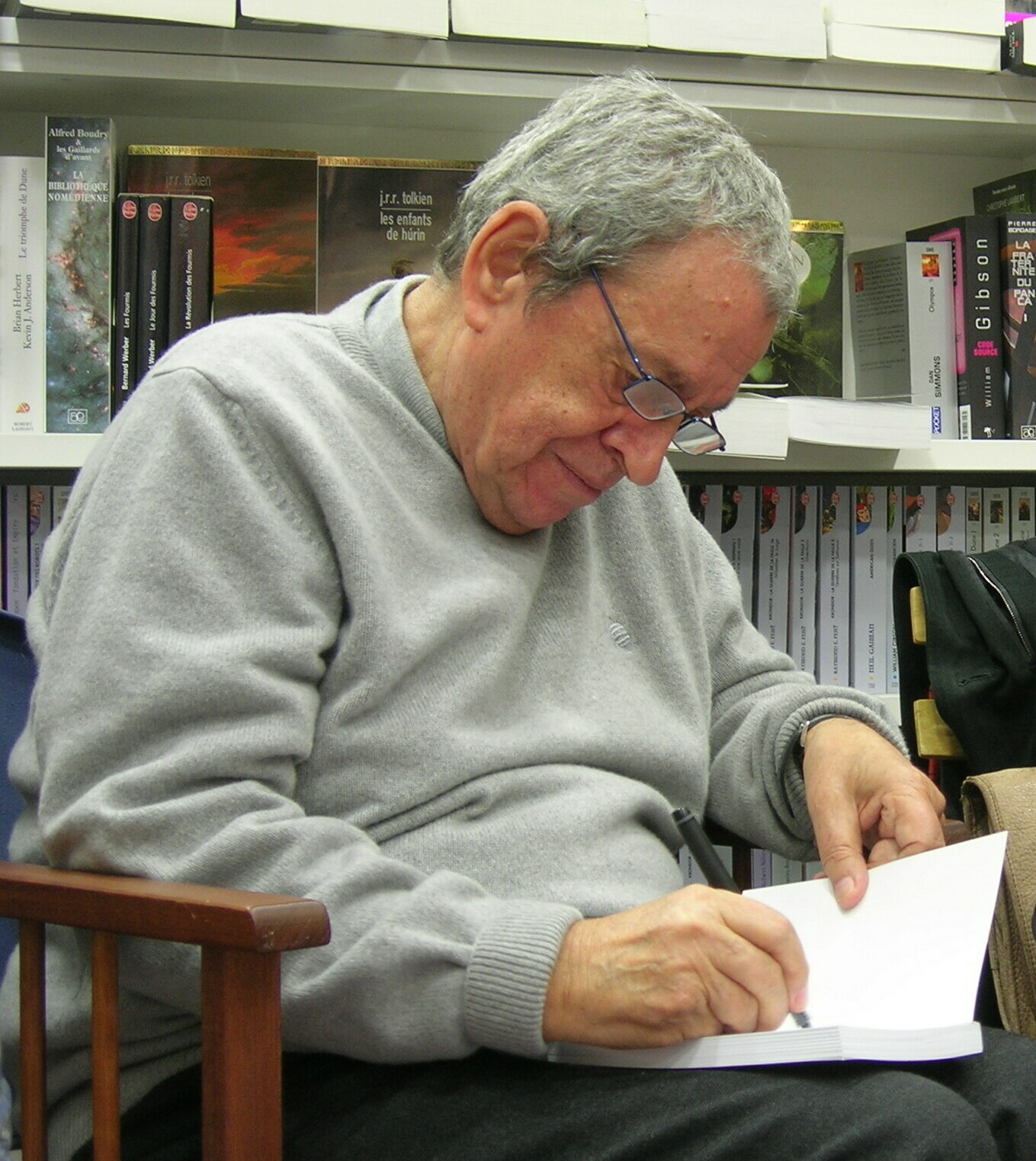
- Ongaro in 2008
- Born: 11 August 1925; Venice, Italy
- Died: 23 March 2018 (aged 92); Venice, Italy
- Occupation(s): Journalist, writer, comics artist

Alberto Ongaro (22 August 1925 – 23 March 2018), also known by his pseudonym Alfredo Nogara, was an Italian journalist, writer and comics artist.

== Biography ==
Born in Venice, Ongaro lived in South America and England for a long time, before returning to Venice in 1979.

A friend and collaborator of Hugo Pratt, Ongaro also worked for Il Corriere dei Piccoli. As a journalist, he was a foreign correspondent of L'Europeo, and he also wrote historical and adventure books, including La taverna del doge Loredan (1980), La partita (1986) and Il ponte della solita ora (2006). Ongaro died in Venice on 23 March 2018, aged 92.
