= Atlántida (magazine) =

General interest and women's magazine in Argentina (1918-1970)

- July 1970 issue (among its last)
- Categories: News
- Frequency: Weekly, monthly (after 1950)
- Publisher: Editorial Atlántida
- Total circulation (1918): 56,000
- First issue: March 7, 1918
- Final issue: December 1970
- Country: Argentina
- Language: Spanish

Atlántida was a general interest and women's magazine published in Argentina between 1918 and 1970.

== History ==
A 1958 issue of Atlántida illustrated by Spanish artist Roberto Martínez Baldrich.

The magazine was launched by Uruguayan-Argentine publisher Constancio C. Vigil, who established the Atlántida Publishing House in 1918. The company's homonymous weekly would also be its first publication. Atlántida was designed as a news and general interest weekly tailored primarily for women (the company would concurrently launch El Gráfico, for sports readers, and the children's magazine Billiken). Vigil named both the publishing house and its flagship magazine from a poem of the same name by Olegario Víctor Andrade, who wrote it as an homage to Americanism.

Atlántida was an early success, with a circulation of 45,000 of its maiden issue (March 7, 1918), and of 56,000 by the end of the year. Its chief competition was El Hogar, printed by Editorial Haynes since 1904; Atlántida generally appealed to a more upscale readership, however. Advertisers secured space in the magazine months in advance, and news agents forfeited the right to return unsold copies. Adopting as one of its missions "the destruction of barbaric prejudices which purport women to be inferior," Atlántida featured watercolor images of debonair women on its covers, and featured a women's interest section, En rueda de damas (Ladies' Round). It also included sections on culture and the day's politics, notably El salón de los pasos perdidos (in reference to a pavilion in the Argentine Congress) and a special supplement printed following the 1930 Argentine coup d'état: La Revolución del 6 de Septiembre. The magazine's editorials, titled La vida que pasa (Life as It Happens) initially reflected Vigil's humanist views. These editorials opposed World War I, and advocated for the rights of poor children, the disabled, and Argentine Amerindians, among other traditionally disenfranchised groups.

The magazine was also notable for its regular contributors, which included Leopoldo Lugones, Gabriela Mistral (from Chile), and Alfonsina Storni. A glossy insert, La Semana Gráfica, was added to publish special reports, and the magazine was the first in Argentina to incorporate entry submission contests, whereby once a month readers were invited to submit witty captions for a given photograph; these contests attracted up to 15,000 entries monthly.

Atlántida was eclipsed by its longtime rival, El Hogar, during the 1940s and '50s, and it became a monthly publication. The magazine's distinctive watercolor covers were created by Spanish illustrator Roberto Martínez Baldrich between 1953 and his death in 1959, after which its covers adopted a news magazine format. Atlántida was affected by competition from a growing number of news magazines in Argentina during the 1960s, notably Panorama, Primera Plana, and Siete Días Ilustrados, among others. The 1965 launch of Gente, a celebrity magazine, by its publishers further diffused its readership, and Atlántida became largely devoted to cultural and current events commentary. The magazine closed in 1970.
