= Richard Hall (painter) =

French painter

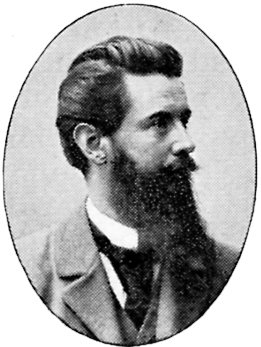
- Richard Hall in 1901
- Born: 18 April 1860; Pori, Grand Duchy of Finland
- Died: 23 July 1942 (aged 82); Buenos Aires, Argentine
- Known for: Painting

Richard Hall (18 April 1860 – 23 June 1942) was a Finnish-born painter who made his career in France, United States and Argentina. Hall is best known of his portraits, but also painted other genres such as still life paintings, in particular, flower motifs, intimate and homely sceneries, and landscape.

== Life ==
=== Early years ===
Richard Hall was born in Pori, Finland, as a son of the British businessman William R. Hall Tredennick and the Swiss Alexandrine Cornetz. His grandfather John Hall had emigrated to Finland in the early 1800s. The family also lived in Helsinki before moving to London in 1867. At the age of 15, Hall moved to Stockholm with his family and entered the Royal Academy of Fine Arts, graduating in 1881. He studied under Georg von Rosen, August Malmström, Josef Wilhelm Wallander and Mårten Eskil Winge, and took private lessons from Edvard Perséus. His year of graduation, Hall was awarded with the H. M. The King's Medal for winning an art competition announced by the Royal Academy. During his years in Stockholm, Hall became acquainted with artists like Richard Bergh, Oscar Björck, Bruno Liljefors and Anders Zorn.

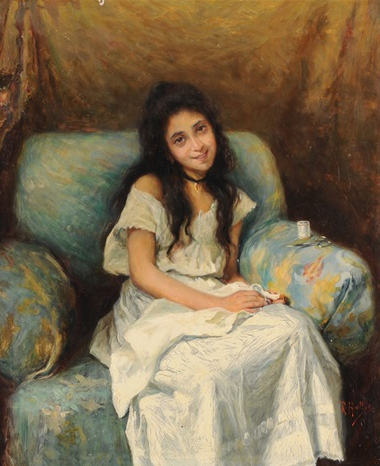
Young Girl Sewing

=== In France and the United States ===
After his graduation, Hall moved to Paris, where he shared a studio with Richard Bergh and studied under Jean-Paul Laurens, Raphaël Collin and Jean-Joseph Benjamin-Constant. In Paris, he also met Finnish artists like Albert Edelfelt and Ville Vallgren. Hall started his career as a genre painter, but was soon specialized in portraits of nobilities and celebrities. Since 1883, Hall was annually represented at the Paris Salon exhibition, and had his works on display at the gallery of Georges Petit.

Hall married his cousin Julia Berrigau Cornetz in 1881 and had two children. The family lived for six years in Bretagne, until Julia died in 1891. After his wife's death, Hall spent eight months in a Trappist order in Nantes. In the early 1900s, Hall spent summers in the Baltic island of Öland, where he met the baroness Anna von Mühlenfels, who became Hall's second wife in 1906. In 1902, the American businessman William Kissam Vanderbilt invited Hall to New York City. He painted members of the Vanderbilt family and other representatives of New York's upper class.

In 1903 and 1907, Hall had an exhibition at the Knoedler Gallery in New York, and in 1904 and 1905 in the Royal Academy in London.In his native Finland, Hall had his only exhibition in 1909 at the House of Nobility in Helsinki. However, Hall visited the country regularly to meet his parents.

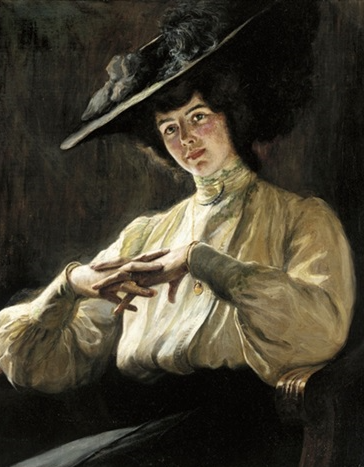
A Good Listener

=== In Argentina ===
In 1915, Hall emigrated to Argentina where he lived in Mar del Plata. In addition on his painting, Hall worked as an illustrator for Editorial Haynes, which published magazines and newspapers such as El Hogar and El Mundo. Hall died in Buenos Aires in 1942 at the age of 82. He was buried in Mar del Plata.

Hall's work is included in the collections of several museums in Sweden, France and Argentina. In his native country, Hall's works are included in the collections of the Finnish National Gallery, Pori Art Museum and Turku Art Museum.
