= Editorial Atlántida =

Argentine publishing house

- Parent company: Televisa (since 2007 until 2017)
- Founded: 1918
- Founder: Constancio C. Vigil
- Country of origin: Argentina
- Headquarters location: Azopardo 565; Buenos Aires
- Distribution: in América Continent
- Publication types: Editorial Atlántida (book publisher); Gente, Somos, Para Tí, Para Tí Deco, PuroDiseño, Billiken, La Valijita, Para Teens, Negocios y Política, Paparazzi (magazines)
- Revenue: US$35.6 million (2007)
- Official website: www.atlantidalibros.com.ar

Editorial Atlántida is an Argentine publishing house and the country's leading magazine publisher and distributor.

== History ==
=== Development ===
Editorial Atlántida's origins began with three magazines founded by an Uruguayan-Argentine journalist, Constancio C. Vigil, between 1904 and 1911: the children's weekly Pulgarcito (akin to "Tom Thumb"), Germinal, and his most successful early periodical, the general interest weekly, Mundo Argentino ("Argentine World"). Much as Pulgarcito had been before competition led to its 1907 closure, Mundo Argentino was a heavily illustrated magazine packed with advertisements and coupons and centered on a particular genre without being limited to it. The magazine, by 1912, boasted a weekly circulation of over 36,000, though the versatile businessman sold it at its peak to Editorial Haynes in 1917; by then, Mundo Argentino sold 118,000 copies a week (in a country with fewer than 5 million adults).

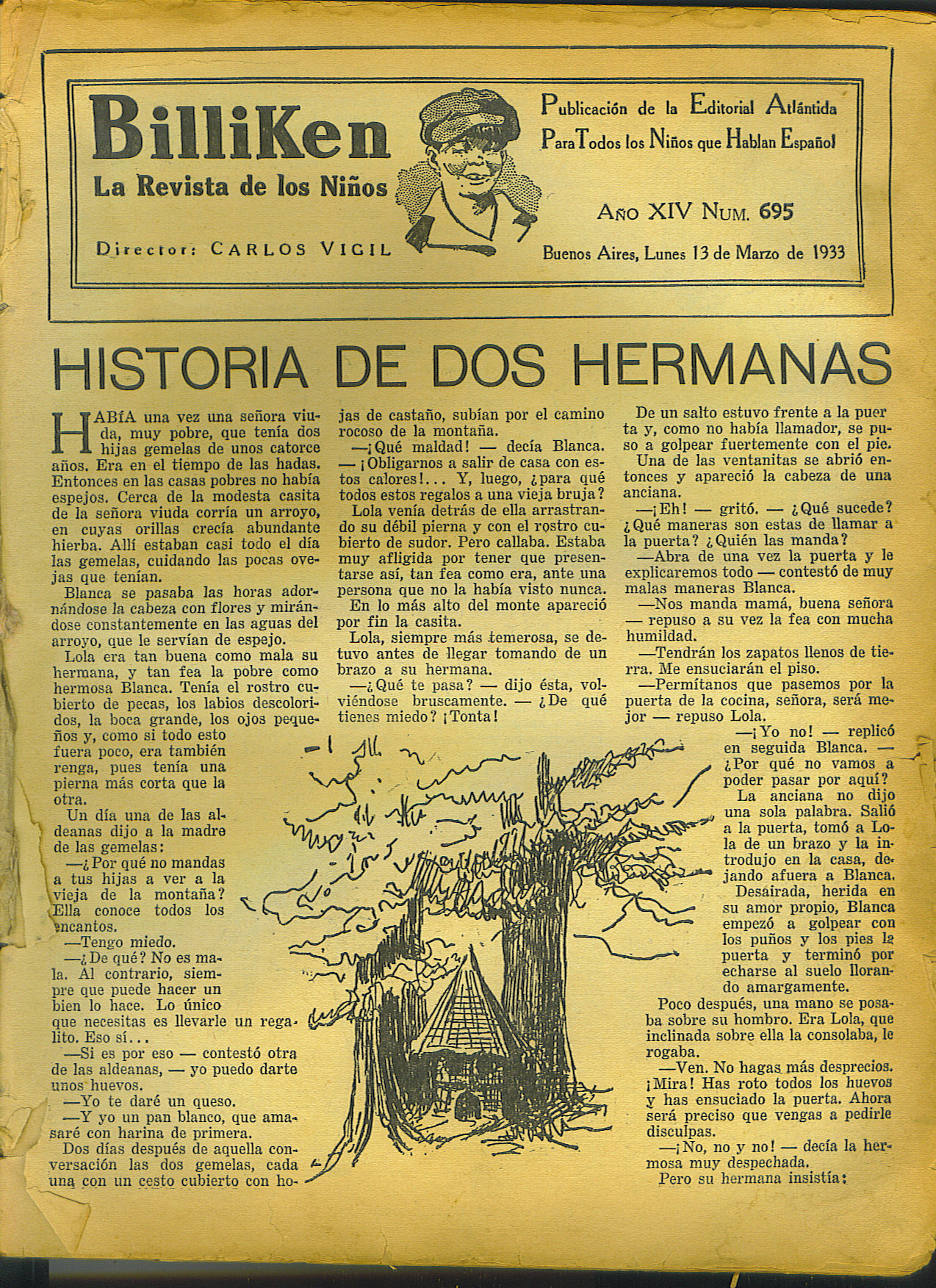
A 1933 issue of the children's periodical, Billiken

Vigil parlayed the sale into the establishment of a new publishing house: Editorial Atlántida. The company would publish his new titles: a current events magazine, Atlántida (1918), the sports weekly El Gráfico, the children's magazine Billiken (both in 1919), and the first women's magazine published in Argentina, Para Tí ("For You," 1922); the latter three remain the oldest Argentine magazines still in publication, and became circulation leaders in the Spanish-speaking world. Other well-known magazines distributed by Atlántida included Iris (1920), Grand Guiñol (1922), Tipperary (1928), El Golfer Argentino (1931), Cinegraf, and Vida Nuestra (both from 1932).

Atlántida published Vigil's numerous, best-selling books, as well. He authored a total of 134 books from 1915, including 50 children's titles. Among the group's variety of magazines, Billiken remained the most popular over the decades. The magazine's reach allowed Vigil to organize "Billiken Committees" for the purpose of raising donations of food and money for the needy during the Great Depression, organizing over 40,000 children before the project ended; by the 1950s, the magazine's circulation totalled over 500,000 - including some 30,000 sold Uruguay and in the rest of Latin America.

Remaining part of the Vigil Group after its founder's death in 1954, Atlántida became the local leader in women's magazines with the 1965 launch of Gente. The group lost ground in the children's magazine market with the 1964 advent of Manuel García Ferré's Anteojito, however, and by 1972 Billiken had slipped to third place, behind Anteojito and Dante Quinterno's Locuras de Isidoro. The company, in turn, became the first to secure rights to distribute the lucrative Superman comic book series locally, in 1971. That year, the Argentine government sold a stake in the public Channel 13, appointing Constancio Vigil III its Executive Director; populist President Juan Perón renationalized the station in 1974, however.

=== Atlántida and the last dictatorship ===
Following the installation of Argentina's last dictatorship in 1976, Atlántida's publications became the regime's explicit supporters. In evidence well before the 1976 coup, the publishing house's bias towards military rule intensified and became most apparent in its best-selling women's magazines, Gente and Para Tí, and the current-affairs weekly, Somos. Para Tí set the trend by publishing a lengthy feature on General Jorge Videla's home life early in his tenure, extolling the new dictator as a man of "discipline, valor and sacrifice."

The magazine's band-wagon tone was put into service for the dictatorship in its many crises. A severe recession and looming conflict with neighboring Chile, in 1978, was countered by exhortations to "support the process that began on March 24, 1976, when we took a decisive step towards political maturity." The Argentine national football team's victory in the 1978 FIFA World Cup was followed by a Somos cover portraying not the team - but the dictator, as he rose in the bleachers to cheer the occasion. Growing international pressure against the regime's Dirty War resulted in a petition campaign organized by Para Tí, in which postcards labeled "Argentina: The Whole Truth" could be torn out by readers and mailed to a list of addresses of the regime's most prominent international critics, including U.S. President Jimmy Carter, Senator Ted Kennedy, and French President Valéry Giscard d'Estaing, as well as Amnesty International and numerous international newspapers of record.

Atlántida sponsored the regime's political offensive in primary schools, El niño, la escuela y el ejército ("Children, Schools, and the Army"), and even after the return to democracy in 1983, Somos ran a series on (non-existent) "rehabilitation camps for subversives," which included doctored photographs of detainees in a "familial atmosphere," complete with medical, religious, psychological and legal services.

=== Recent history ===
The group benefited from President Carlos Menem's 1989 decision to privatize Argentina's array of state-owned media outlets. Atlántida purchased top-rated Radio Continental, LOS40 and Telefe; it formed a partnership in 1998 with Citicorp and Telefónica de España, through which it controlled Telefé, a leading local cable television station, and eight other television stations. Its best-selling sports magazine, El Gráfico, was sold to local broadcaster Torneos y Competencias in 1998.

The Vigil Group's withdrawal from the consortium in 2000, however, led to a refocus in favor of their standby: publishing. Atlántida launched a tabloid, Paparazzi, in 2001, and in 2005, new versions of the well-known Para Tí: Para Tí Mamá and Para Teens; in all, its magazine unit sold 12.8 million copies in 2006, or a 30% market share in Argentina, and its book publishing unit remained significant, as well: printing 650,000 books annually (a 10% local market share).

Atlántida's magazine publishing unit was sold to Mexican telecommunications giant Televisa, in 2007. The association finished in 2017 and with an alliance with Infobae.com the websites of magazines Para Ti and Gente are created.

Since 2018 Atlántida was acquired by a private investment fund of Argentine capital and is experiencing one of the biggest growth challenges in its history, responding to the current content needs.

== Publications ==
=== Current ===
- Billiken (1919-Present)
- Para Ti (1922-Present)
- Gente (1965-Present)
- Paparazzi (2001-Present)

=== Former ===
- Atlántida
- El Gráfico (1919-2000)
- Iris
- Grand Guiñol
- Tipperary
- Chacra (1930-2002)
- El Golfer Argentino
- Cinegraf
- Vida Nuestra
- Marilú
- Sport
- Canal TV
- Somos (1976-1993)
- Plena
- Conozca más (1991-1999)
- Tele Clic (1991-1998)
- Negocios
- Para Teens (2003-2020)
- Para Ti Mamá (2005-2020)
- La Valijita (2005-2020)
- PuroDiseño (2020-2022)
- Negocios y Política (2020-2023)
- Latin Power (2021)
