= Plaza del sí =

The Plaza del sí (Spanish: Plaza of the "yes") was a demonstration held in Argentina on April 6, 1990, at the Plaza de Mayo. It was called by journalist Bernardo Neustadt, and asked for the support to then president Carlos Menem. It was attended by 80,000 people. People attended the demonstration without political banners. Menem made a brief speech, and asked for national unity.
