= Dante Panzeri =

Argentine sports journalist (1921–1978)

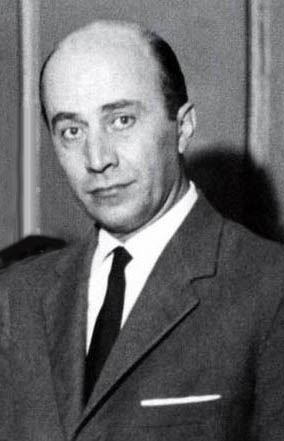
- Panzeri during his years in El Gráfico
- Born: November 5, 1921; Las Varillas, Córdoba Province
- Died: April 14, 1978 (aged 56); Buenos Aires
- Occupation: Journalist
- Notable work: Fútbol: Dinámica de lo Impensado

Dante Panzeri (November 5, 1921 in Las Varillas, Córdoba – April 14, 1978 in Buenos Aires) was a sports journalist and columnist who was notable for the influence of his opinions and analysis about sports, specially in football, having changed the way of covering sports events in Argentina.

Panzeri is widely considered one of the most notable sports journalists ever in Argentina. Most his work was published on El Gráfico, where Panzeri worked for almost 20 years.

== Biography ==
Born in Las Varillas, a small town of Córdoba, Panzeri spent his childhood in the city of San Francisco of the same province. Before the age of 20, he moved to Buenos Aires.

Panzeri joined sports magazine El Gráfico in 1943, writing articles about athletics, cycling, and swimming, among others. His articles about football would come much later.

Panzeri's articles about football were notables for the way he dealt with the sport, with emphasis on analysing the game rather than writing a simple chronicle. By the late 1940s, Panzeri was one of the most renowned journalists of El Gráfico along with Ricardo Lorenzo Rodríguez (mostly known for his nickname Borocotó) and Félix Frascara. In the 1950s Panzeri became director of the magazine. During his tenure as director, he brought to the magazine sports journalists such as Pepe Peña, Osvaldo Ardizzone and former Boca Juniors player Ernesto Lazzatti.

Panzeri opposed to the excessive use of tactics in football, with Juan Carlos Lorenzo, Osvaldo Zubeldía, Argentino Geronazzo and José D'Ámico as some trainers that were accused of being excessively obsessed with tactics. Close to Ernesto Lazzatti and Adolfo Pedernera, Panzeri alleged that the use of tactics distorted the essence of the game.

The only one that knows what happens in a sports event is the sportman. All the others are chamuyetas [sic], (Note: Word used to refer to a chatterbox person in Argentina) simple spectators that document memories of things that would never repeat again.

— Panzeri during an interview, 1973

After the 1962 FIFA World Cup held in Chile, Panzeri left his charge in El Gráfico, after he was pressed to publish advertisements of then Ministry of Economy, Alvaro Alsogaray. He refused alleging the spirit of the magazine would be distorted if he had agreed to that. Panzeri continued his career as journalist in Así magazine. In 1965 he had his own TV program, "Discusiones por Deporte" in Canal 7. In 1966 he worked as correspondent for newspaper Crónica at the 1966 FIFA World Cup.

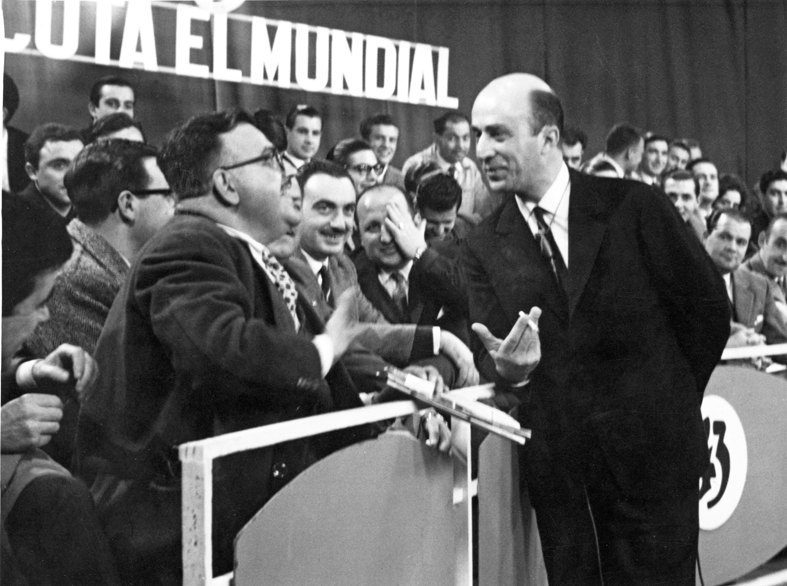
Panzeri in a TV studio, during a discussion on the 1978 World Cup

In 1967, Panzeri's first book, Fútbol: Dinámica de lo Impensado, was published. The title expressed the idea that beyond the tactics and strategy planned by a coach, it was the player who decided on the field. In Dinámica de lo Impensado Panzeri expressed his preference for the "pure talent" of the Argentine footballer, showing also his concern about the loss of the sport as a simple game and the establishment of an industry around it.

During the 1970s, Panzeri worked for several media such as newspaper La Opinión and magazines Satiricón and Goles. He was also chief of the sports section of newspaper La Prensa until his death in 1978. His work on the radio include "Radioshow", a program broadcast by Radio Del Plata.

In 1974, he published a second book, Burguesía y gangsterismo en el deporte, where he took readers behind the scenes at Argentine football's environment, describing the corruption and decadence of executives, coaches, journalists and even supporters.

Panzeri's strong character led him to confront football executives such as Raúl Colombo and Alberto Armando, and even colleagues Bernardo Neustadt and Pepe Peña.

Panzeri also opposed the 1978 FIFA World Cup was held in Argentina, arguing that "it would be a waste of money". About his position, Admiral Carlos Lacoste used to tell an anecdote referring a visit he made to Panzeri's house to convince him about the convenience of holding the Cup in Argentina, with no satisfactory results. Otherwise, Panzeri almost convinced his wife, in Lacoste's own words.

Panzeri died in April 1978, two months before the World Cup that finally would be won by Argentina.

== Quotes ==
(translated)

Positive or negative critic don't exist; the critic exists by itself, beyond a certain activity may be defined as "good" or "bad".

A journalist must be a prosecutor of the media for which he works.

In search of truth, a journalist must leave friendships behind. He has to be willing to lose friends with the purpose of exposing his points of view.

In football, there is no planning to win matches without depending on players' individual abilities. The 'plan' is the player and his circumstances.

Nobody truly knows about football. Football is occult science, impossible to be taught in schools. Football is empiricism.

== Bibliography ==
- Fútbol: Dinámica de lo impensado, Capitán Swing (1967) – ISBN 9788493898588
- Burguesía y gangsterismo en el deporte, Capital Intelectual (1974) – ISBN 978-987-614-323-3

=== Posthumous ===
- Dirigentes, decencia y wines (Anthology), Ed. Sudamericana (2013) – ISBN 9789500741996
