= Constancio C. Vigil =

Uruguayan-Argentine writer and publisher

Constancio Cecilio Vigil Olid
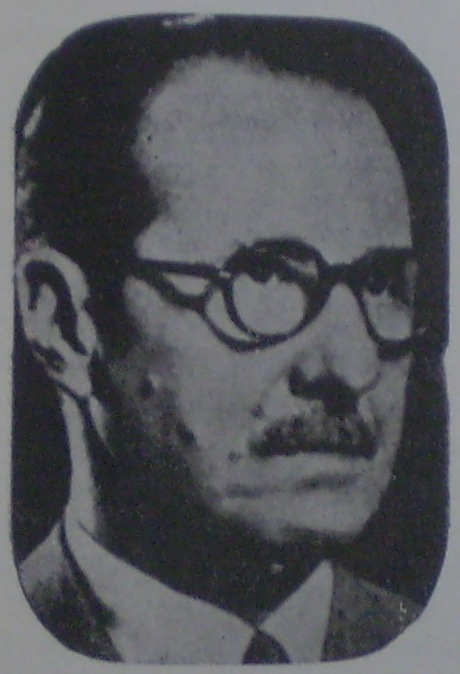
- Constancio C. Vigil in 1966
- Born: September 4, 1876; Rocha, Uruguay
- Died: September 24, 1954 (aged 78); Buenos Aires

Constancio Cecilio Vigil Olid (September 4, 1876 – September 24, 1954) was a Uruguayan-Argentine writer and prominent publisher.

== Biography ==
Constancio Vigil was born in Rocha, Uruguay, in 1876. His father, a local politician, was forced to relocate to the nation's capital, Montevideo, following a political dispute. The young man graduated from the Universidad de la República, started as a poetry contributor to writer José Enrique Rodó, and became a journalist for El Nacional and, in 1901, founded his first periodical, Alborada ("Dawn"). He was named Editor-in-chief of La Prensa, a newspaper aligned with the Partido Blanco ("White Party"). Political intrigue once again intruded in the young man's life, however, when the newspaper was forcibly shuttered in 1903, leading Vigil to relocate to neighboring Buenos Aires, Argentina.

The ambitious journalist created three magazines between 1904 and 1911: the children's weekly Pulgarcito (akin to "Tom Thumb"), Germinal, and his most successful early periodical, the general interest weekly, Mundo Argentino ("Argentine World"). Much as Pulgarcito had been before competition led to its 1907 closure, Mundo Argentino was a heavily illustrated magazine packed with advertisements and coupons and centered on a particular genre without being limited to it. The magazine, by 1912, boasted a weekly circulation of over 36,000, though the versatile businessman sold it at its peak to Editorial Haynes in 1917; by then, Mundo Argentino sold 118,000 copies a week (in a country with fewer than 5 million adults).

Vigil parlayed the sale into the establishment of a new publishing house: Editorial Atlántida. The company would publish his new titles: a news and commentary magazine, Atlántida (1918), the sports weekly El Gráfico, the children's magazine Billiken (both in 1919), and for women, Para Tí ("For You," 1922); the latter three remain the oldest Argentine magazines still in publication, became circulation leaders in the Spanish-speaking world.

The noted publisher published a series of best-selling children's books through Atlántida, as well. He authored a total of 134 books from 1915, including 50 children's titles such as El Erial ("The Wild Field"), El Mono Relojero ("The Monkey Repairs Watches"), ¡Upa!, and Hormiguita Viajera ("Traveling Ant").

Among the books he authored other than children's titles, some of the best-known were:

- Miseria artificial ("Artificial Misery," 1915)
- El Clero Católico y la Educación ("Catholic Clergy and Education," 1926)
- Las verdades ocultas ("Hidden Truths," 1927)
- Cartas a gente menuda ("Letters to Young People," 1927)
- Marta y Jorge (1927)
- Los que pasan ("People Come and Go," 1927)
- Compañero ("Comrade," 1928)
- Amar es vivir ("To Love is to Live," 1941)
- Vidas que pasan ("Lives That Come and Go," 1941)
- La educación del hijo ("Rearing Your Child," 1941)
- El hombre y los animales ("Man and the Animals," 1943)

A supporter of labor and social reform (as well as children's rights) early on, Vigil became increasingly conservative after the 1918 establishment of Atlántida publishers. A 1924 editorial in Billiken explained that:

Would it be that all flowers and all children could enjoy caressing sunlight and a thoughtful gardener's gentle touch! But this is not possible, and thus there are weatherbeaten flowers and poor children. Poverty and wealth respond to a natural order, and this makes any change impossible. There will always be poor children.

Vigil, however, remained active during the Great Depression, which until the late 1930s caused severe hardship in Argentine society. He marshalled his publishing empire's reach to foster "Billiken Committees" - groups of middle-class schoolchildren guided by the namesake magazine to raise donations of food and money for the needy; these groups reportedly grew to over 40,000 children before the project ended.

These efforts and his donations of reading material to schools led to his being honored with the naming of 3,000 schools, auditoria, and libraries in Argentina, over the decades. He was nominated for a Nobel Peace Prize jointly by numerous Latin American newspapers, in 1934, and later awarded the Papal Lateran Cross by Pope Pius XII.

Unusually progressive by the standards of early 20th-century Argentine society, Vigil wrote in his weekly editorials that:

Democracy will be brought forth and nurtured by women. Their education is the keystone of our Republic, and as long as we persist in our ignorance of that fact, all is lost.

It seems, to many, as natural to see a wealthy boxer, pepper miller or sausage maker as it does to see a starving artist. A Japanese proverb posits that "as long as artists cannot afford carriages, no civilization is possible," and I agree.

Politics should promote health, education, culture, work, the careful administration of the budget, graciousness, and justice. It is women who are better suited to a job such as that - not men. Women give us life, and they know best how to organize and improve it.

Constancio Vigil was at his editor's desk in Buenos Aires when he died in 1954, at age 78. Following his death, Atlántida Publishing became increasingly associated with Argentina's often violent, later dictatorships. One of its founder's well-known aphorisms advised, however, that: One should stay far from those who live off others' patriotism.
