= Gente y la actualidad =

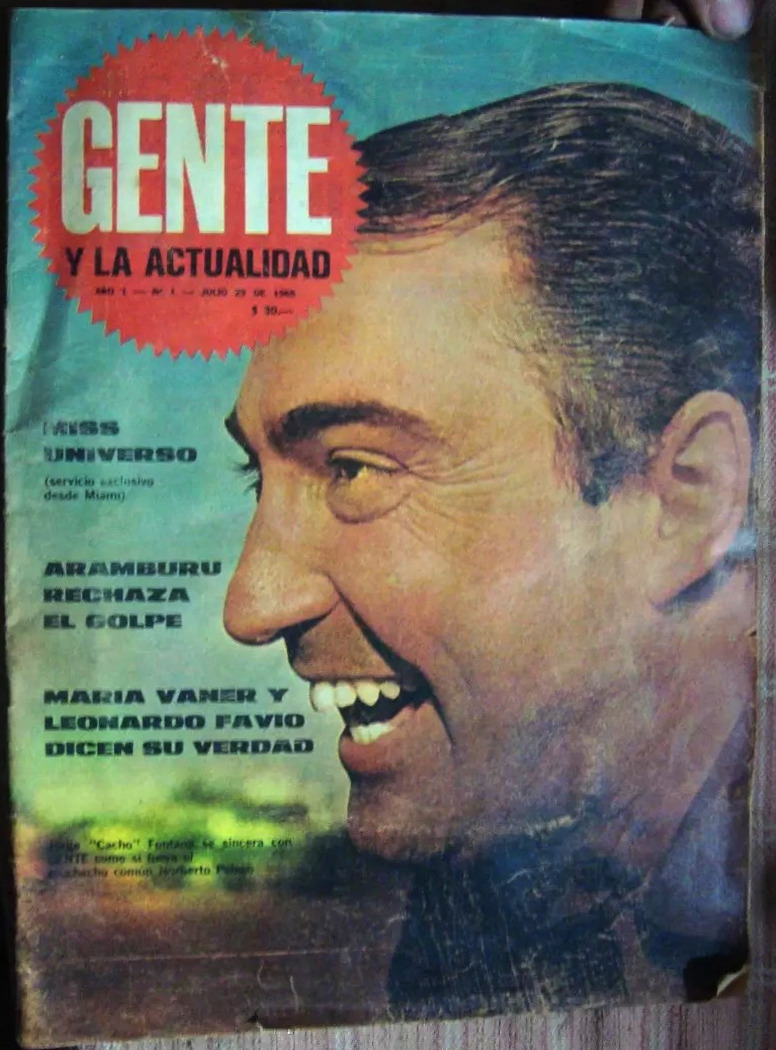
- The front cover of the first issue, featuring Cacho Fontana
- Frequency: Weekly (since 1965 until 2020); Monthly (since 2021)
- Publisher: Editorial Atlántida
- First issue: July 29, 1965; 59 years ago
- Country: Argentina
- Based in: Buenos Aires
- Language: Spanish
- Website: www.gente.com.ar

Gente (complete name: Gente y la actualidad) is an Argentine magazine. It is considered one of the most important gossip magazines in the country. Its concept and design was influenced by the Italian magazine Gente.

It has received criticism for supporting the National Reorganization Process (1976–1983).
