= El Mundo (Argentina) =

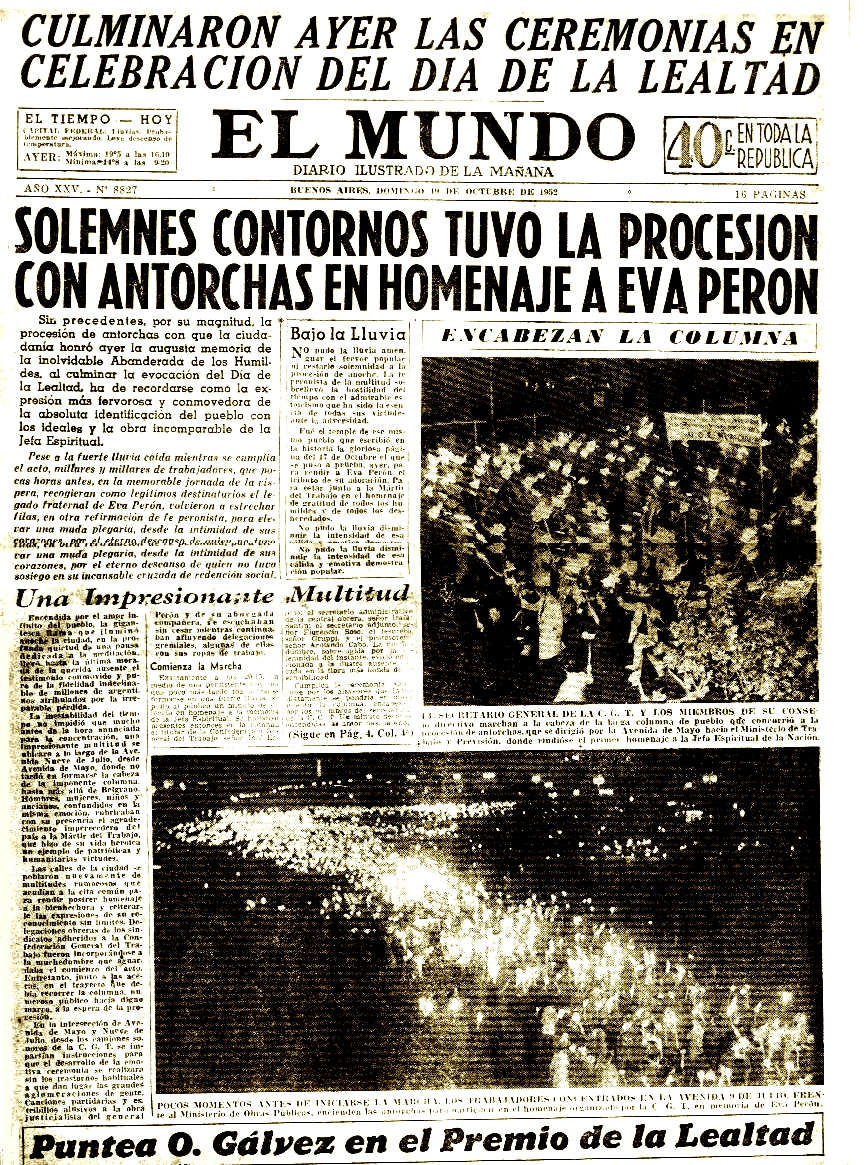
- Cover page of El Mundo from 19 October 1952
- Format: Tabloid
- Founder: Albert Haynes
- Publisher: Editorial Haynes
- Founded: 14 May 1928
- Ceased publication: 22 December 1967; 58 years ago
- Language: Spanish
- Headquarters: Buenos Aires
- Circulation: up to 500,000

El Mundo (The World) was a daily morning paper published in Buenos Aires, Argentina by Editorial Haynes company. It was launched on 14 May 1928 and circulated until mid-1967, when there was an unsuccessful attempt to convert it into an evening paper. Its publication during the Infamous Decade (1930–1943) provided reporting at a time of instability and repression. After Juan Perón's election in 1946, the publishing company was taken over by Peronistas, who forced the paper to take their line.

== Publisher ==
Editorial Haynes (Haynes Publishing) was founded by Albert Haynes, an Englishman who came to Argentina in 1887 to work for the British-owned Buenos Aires Western Railway. Deciding to settle, he entered into publishing, launching the magazine El Hogar (the Home), which became a great success. His company launched other magazines which were advanced for the period, with bold design and images. On 29 December 1923, Editorial Haynes opened its main building on Río de Janeiro and Bogotá Streets, in Buenos Aires, and installed modern printing machinery.

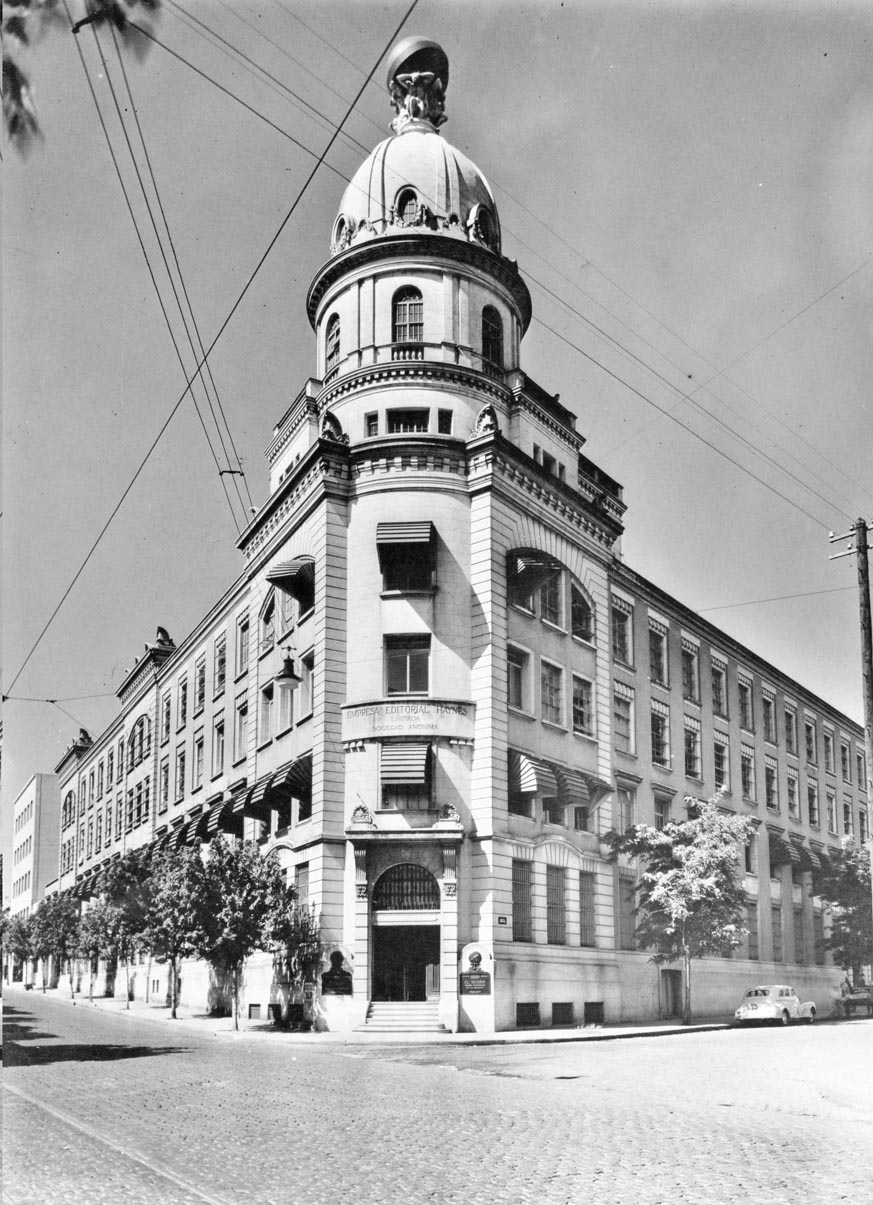
Haynes Publishing headquarters, as seen in 1954

Haynes' first try to found a daily newspaper, El Mundo, did not succeed. On 24 May 1928 his company re-launched El Mundo in a tabloid format, which was easy for workers to read while commuting by trams, was full of pictures, much cheaper than other papers, and featured a weekly competition for a prize of $1,000 dependent on the football results.

Albert Haynes died of a syncope on 21 June 1929, by which time the newspaper was already establishing a strong readership. He was succeeded by his son-in-law, British-born Henry Wesley Smith. He ran the newspaper until it was expropriated and taken over by the Alea state consortium in 1939. Throughout this period, the paper gave quiet support to British interests in Argentina.

Pablo Mastandrea (11 February 1906 – 29 November 1976), an anarchist, worked in Haynes Publishing for decades as a typesetter, along with Don Emilio Mulli. Both were militant union delegates who stood up for the rights of the workers during the Infamous Decade (1930–1943). This period was characterized by electoral fraud, persecution of the political opposition (mainly against the UCR), and generalised government corruption, against the background of the Great Depression.

The writer Roberto Arlt had a weekly column Aguafuertes ("Etchings") that was featured in the paper from 1928 until his death in 1942. In his characteristically forthright and unpretentious style, Arlt commented on the peculiarities, hypocrisies, strangeness and beauty of everyday life in Argentina's capital. These articles included occasional exposés of public institutions, such as the juvenile justice system (Escuela primaria de delincuencia, 26–29 September 1932) or the Public Health System. Some of the Aguafuertes were later collected and published in two volumes under the titles Secretos femeninos, Aguafuertes inéditas, and Tratado de delincuencia. Aguafuertes inéditas were edited by Sergio Olguín and published by Ediciones 12 and Página/12 in 1996.

The comic strip Piantadino, created by Adolfo Mazzone, first appeared in the newspaper in 1941.

== Peronist organ ==
When General Juan Perón was elected president in 1946, he was eager to control the press, hoping to avoid the coups which had been supported by Argentine journalism; these had occurred frequently since 1930. Editorial Haynes was then owned by the Haynes family member Henry Wesley Smith. Early in 1949, the Peronists acquired a majority stake in Editorial Haynes, which at that time published ten periodicals. They forced El Mundo and the other Haynes publications, to become Peronist. Major Carlos Aloe, a friend of Eva Perón, was made head of the enterprise at Eva's personal request, despite his protests that he knew nothing about the business. The paper became an organ of Peronist propaganda. Editorial staff were required to hold a Partido Justicialista membership card or were summarily dismissed.

== Later years ==
After the Revolución Libertadora of 1955, the paper remained government-controlled. It still entered into a new era of journalism under writers such as Bernardo Neustadt, Ulíses Barrera, Ricardo Arias, Víctor Sueiro, Jacobo Timerman, Horacio Verbitsky and many more. In May 1960, José Ber Gelbard called on Jacobo Timerman to undertake a renewal of the old El Mundo newspaper, which was bought by a group of businessmen said to be linked to the Communist Party. The new owners were the heads of Radio Rivadavia, Minera Aluminé and Banco Buenos Aires.

The paper went through several changes of ownership and editor-in-chief. In these later years, the paper took a balanced political stance. It was opposed to the military coup that produced the Argentine Revolution of 1966. Following the coup, the company was gradually run down, a process carried out by the dictator Juan Carlos Onganía and Roberto Noble, owner of the newspaper Clarín. After a year without paying salaries (except sporadic fortnightly payments every 2 to 4 months), the newspaper closed in late 1967; the last issue appeared on 22 December of that year.

The brand was acquired by a group linked to the PRT (Partido Revolucionario de los Trabajadores, or Workers' Revolutionary Party) and the ERP (Ejército Revolucionario del Pueblo or People's Revolutionary Army), who published a successor in 1973 and 1974. Under government repression of the press, at a time when journalists began to leave the country, the newspaper closed again. This successor was not connected to the earlier paper, being printed at a different place and with completely different staff.
