= El Gráfico (Argentina) =

Online sports magazine of Argentina

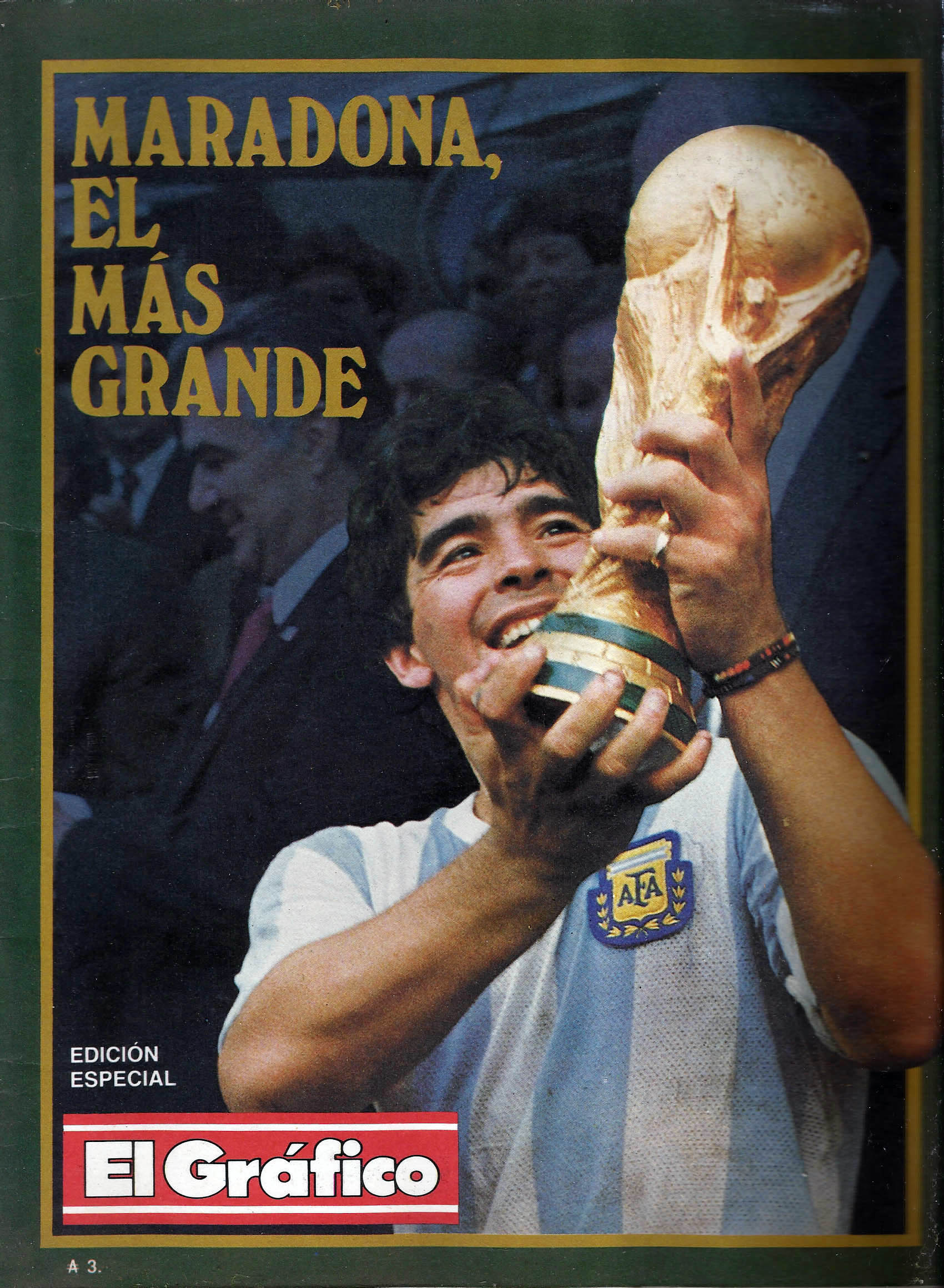
- A special issue celebrating Diego Maradona and Argentina winning the 1986 World Cup
- Categories: Sport
- Frequency: Monthly (2018)
- Format: Print (1919–2018); Online (2018–present)
- Founder: Constancio Vigil
- First issue: May 30, 1919; 107 years ago
- Final issue: January 2018 (print)
- Company: Revistas Deportivas S.A.
- Country: Argentina
- Based in: Buenos Aires
- Language: Spanish
- Website: elgrafico.com.ar
- ISSN: 0017-291X

El Gráfico is an Argentine online sports magazine, originally published by Editorial Atlántida as a print publication between 1919 and 2018. El Gráfico was released in May 1919 as a weekly newspaper, and then turned to a sports magazine exclusively. It began to be scheduled monthly from 2002, and was discontinued in 2018, continuing only online.

The magazine was nicknamed La Biblia del deporte ("The Bible of sports") due to its chronicles, notable journalists and collaborators and its photographies.

== History ==
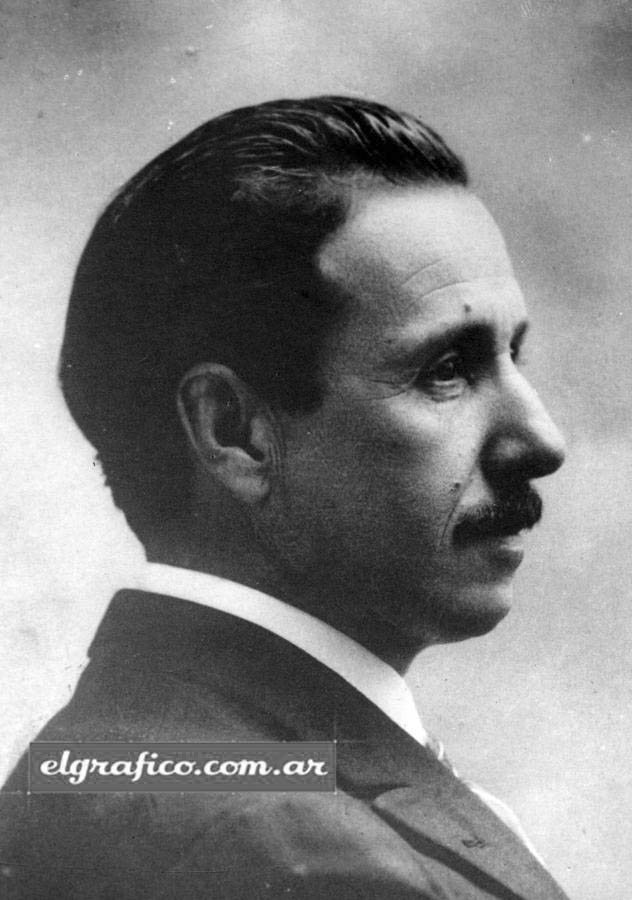
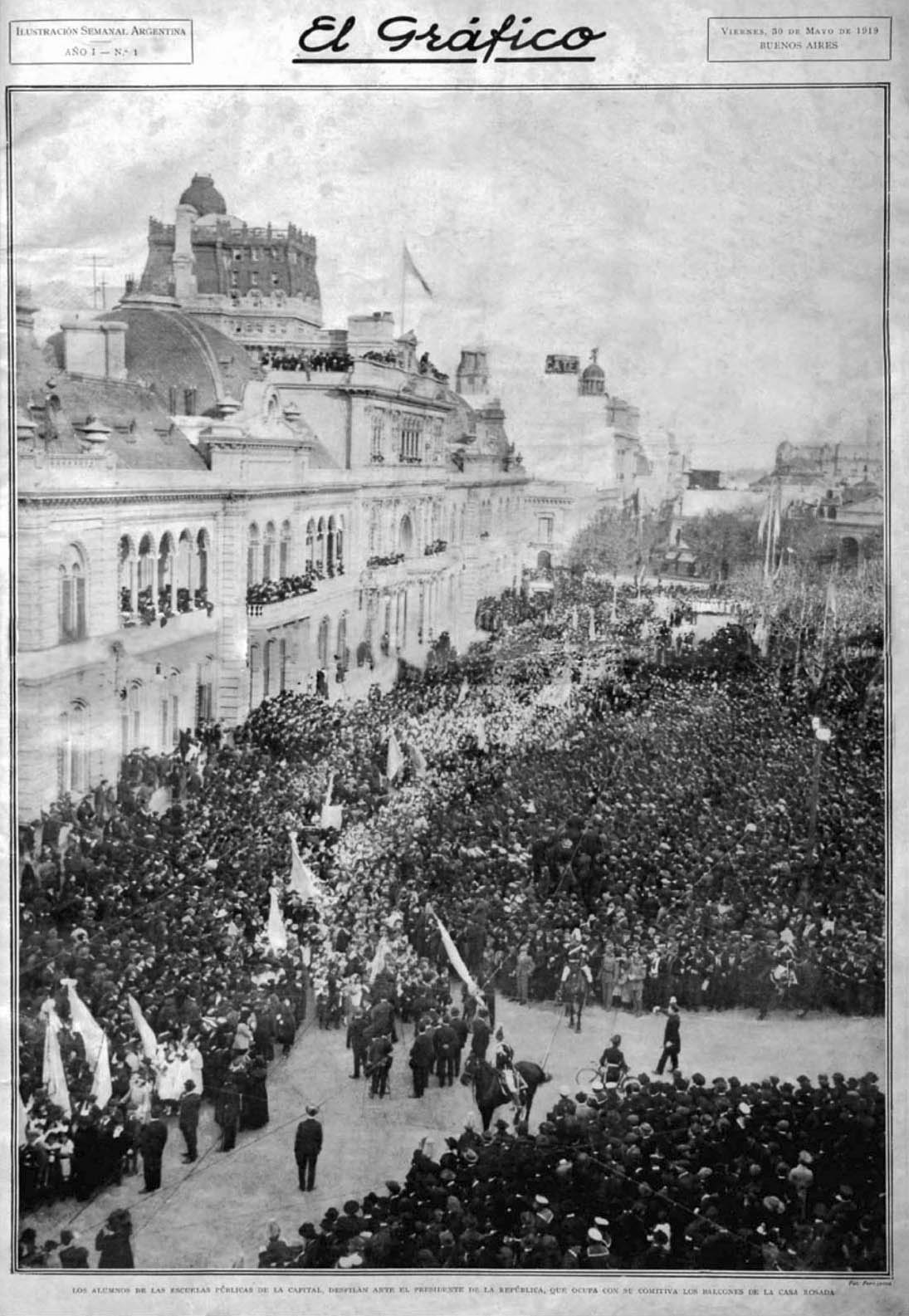
(Above): Constancio C. Vigil, founder;
(below): the first cover of the magazine, May 1919

The foundation of the magazine was an initiative of Uruguayan entrepreneur Constancio C. Vigil, that had founded Atlántida magazine in 1918 with great success, but the tragic week riots in 1919 stopped the activities. After that event and its consequences, Vigil was persuaded in acquiring his own printing. With the machines and the installations ready, he established "Editorial Atlántida", his own publishing house, headquartered in Buenos Aires.

The first magazine from the recently created publisher was El Gráfico, with its #1 being released on 30 May 1919. It was printed in tabloid format (57 x 39 cm) with a great amount of photographs. The predominance of the image was the distinctive mark of the magazine since its launching, clearly explicitly in its name ("The Graphic" in Spanish)

The first cover showed a children parade in front of Casa Rosada for the 119th. anniversary of the May Revolution. El Gráfico's first director was Aníbal Vigil, a journalist and also sportsman. Vigil travelled to Paris as special correspondent to cover the 1924 Summer Olympics, being probably the first sports journalist of Argentina attending an Olympic Game.

Other publications by Editorial Atlántida that followed El Gráfico were Billiken (1919, a magazine for children) and a female publication –Para Ti– in 1922.

In the cover of the first number of El Gráfico appeared the legend Ilustración Semanal Argentina at the bottom of the picture. Indeed, the magazine only contained photos and epigraphs which had originated its name ("The Graphic" in English) and at first the publication was not related to sports covering all sort of news and events. Alberto Palazzo (under the pseudonym Garabito) was the first photographer of the magazine.

Although not a sports magazine, the #5 was the first to include a football chronicle on its cover, a match between Argentina and Uruguay national teams. Goalkeeper Américo Tesoriere was the first sportman to appear on the cover (#158, July 1922). But it was not until 1925 (#333) when El Gráfico became a full sports magazine.

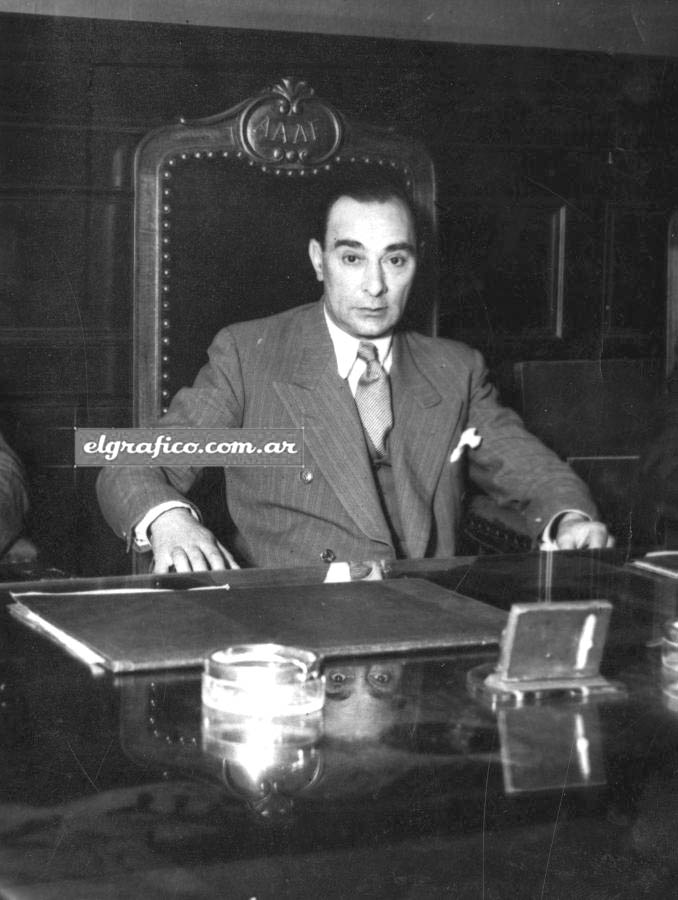
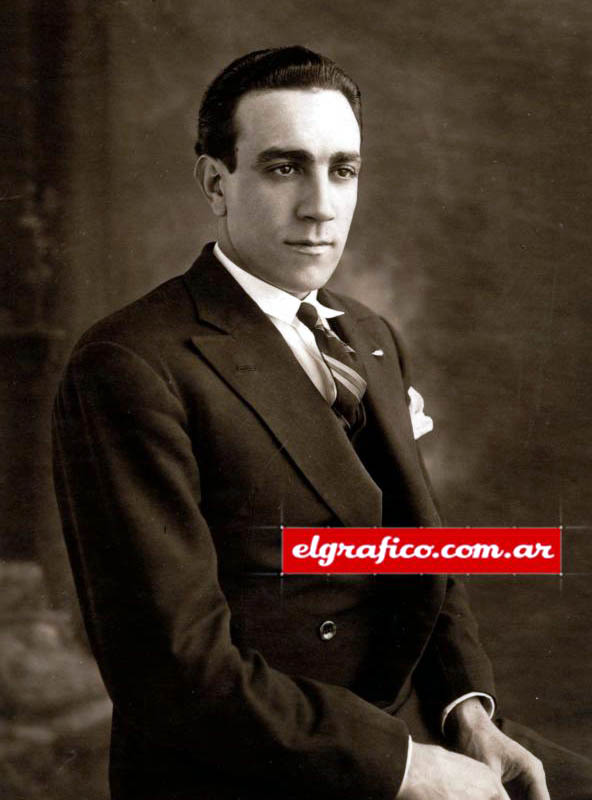
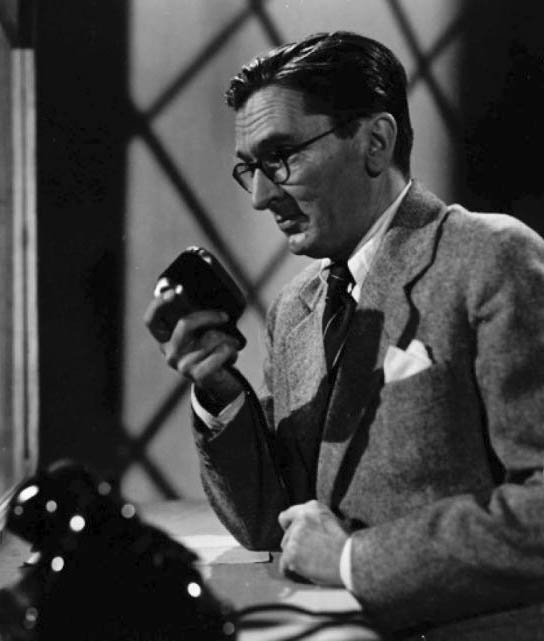
Alfredo Rossi (Chantecler) was a prominent analizer of football; while Ricardo Lorenzo (a) Borocotó and Félix Frascara were the most notable journalists of the staff between the 1930s to the 1950s.

One of the first notable collaborators was Alfredo Rossi (a) Chantecler, who was probably the first sports journalist with an analytic view of the game. His chronicles about football players became memorable. Rossi joined in 1925 and remained to 1941 From the 1930s to the 1960s, Félix Frascara and Ricardo Lorenzo (mostly known for his pseudonym Borocotó) highlighted as the main journalists of the magazine. Borocotó (pseudonym for Ricardo Lorenzo) wrote about several sports such as football, basketball, cycling (his favourite), and rowing in his characteristic simple style. The column "Apiladas" was his most famous creation. Félix Frascara's column about boxing, "Contragolpes", became his distinctive mark.

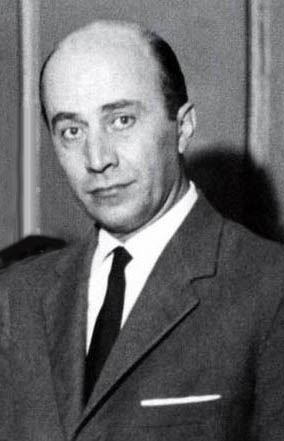
Dante Panzeri directed the magazine with his unique style, although sales decreased considerably.

In 1959, Dante Panzeri joined to the staff. Panzeri opposed to the excessive use of tactics in football, with Juan Carlos Lorenzo, Osvaldo Zubeldía, Argentino Geronazzo and José D'Amico as some trainers that were accused of being excessively obsessed with tactics. Despite Panzeri's critical style (which has remained as a strong influence for journalists that succeed him), El Gráfico experienced a strong decrease in its sales, from 250,000 sold to only 90,000 during those years.

After the 1962 FIFA World Cup held in Chile, Panzeri left his charge in El Gráfico, after he was pressed to publish advertisements of then Ministry of Economy, Alvaro Alsogaray. He refused alleging the spirit of the magazine would be distorted if he had agreed to that., On the other hand, sales decreased from 230,000 to 78,000. To stop that decline, Aníbal and Constancio Vigil brought back Carlos Fontanarrosa, appointing him as director of the magazine.

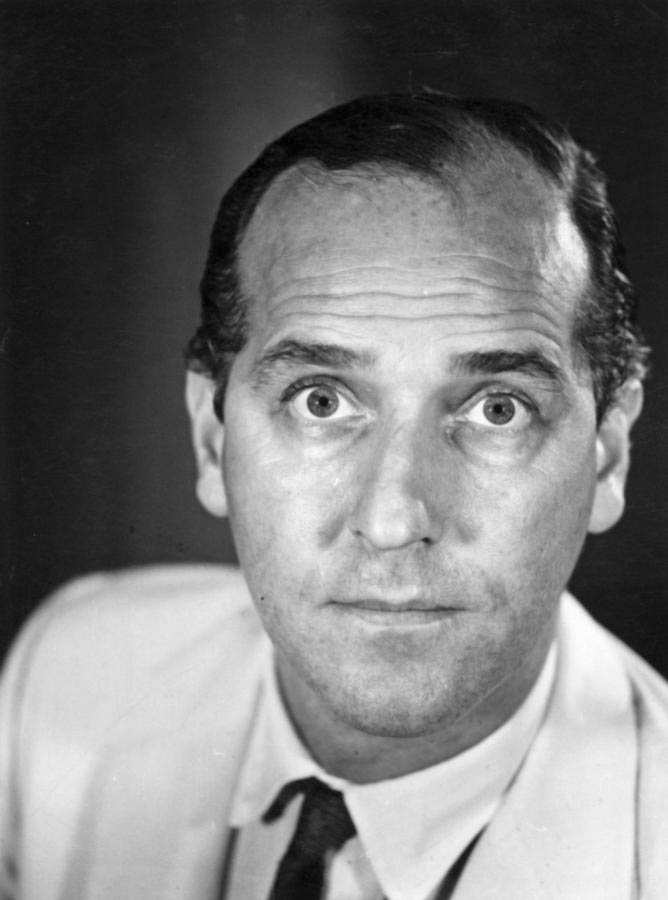
Carlos Fontanarrosa led the magazine to a new era, bringing a modern style to attract new audiences.

Under Fontanarrosa's direction, El Gráfico changed its editorial policy, focusing on the most recent news and events. The latest technological advancement were acquired to improve the quality of the magazine; Journalists Julio César Pasquato (a) Juvenal (who had gaining prestige working in La Razón) and Emilio Lafferranderie (a) El Veco –considered a successor of Borocotó– were added to the staff. Other journalists hired were Osvaldo Ardizzone, Héctor Onesime and Pepe Peña. From then on, El Gráfico covered the most notable sports events with a rich array of photographies to show them to readers. After that change of direction, El Gráfico recovered and sales increased. Fontanarrosa remained in his charge until 1977 when he quit.

The best selling era of El Gráfico was during the 1986 FIFA World Cup when Argentina crowned champion, with 690,998 sold. The second place in the ranking of all-time best seller magazine is for the 1978 FIFA World Cup with 595,924. Diego Maradona was the sports man with the most appearances on the cover: 134, followed by Daniel Passarella (58) and Norberto Alonso (54).

In 1998, sports communication company Torneos y Competencias (that had exclusive rights to broadcast the Argentine Primera División matches due to an agreement with the AFA) bought El Gráfico. The magazine was published weekly by "Revistas Deportivas S.A." until April 2002, when its frequency switched to monthly. The last monthly edition was in January 2018, featuring Independiente manager Ariel Holan on its cover. Since then, El Gráfico has been continued its run on internet exclusively.

== Historical staff ==
Some of the most notable collaborators of the magazine during its near 100 years of existence were:

=== Journalists and writers ===
- Alfredo E. Rossi (Chantecler) (1925–41)
- Ricardo L. Rodríguez (Borocotó) (1926–55)
- Félix D. Frascara (1930–60)
- Hugo Mackern (Free Lance) (1931–81)
- Dante Panzeri (1945–62)
- Ernesto Lazzatti (1950s)
- Osvaldo Ardizzone (1960s–70s)
- Carlos Fontanarrosa (1962–77)
- Julio C. Pasquato (Juvenal) (1962–88)
- Ernesto Cherquis Bialo (1963–90)
- Osvaldo R. Orcasitas (O.R.O.) (1968–2014)
- Horacio Pagani (1969–75)
- Gonzalo Bonadeo (1982–)
- Daniel Arcucci
- Diego Fucks (1984)
- Alejandro Fabbri (1984–94)
- Mariano Hamilton
- Adrián Maladesky
- Aldo Proietto
- Carlos Irusta
- Martín Mazur
- Diego Borinsky
- Elías Perugino
- Matías Rodríguez
- Martín Estévez
- Aldo Proietto
- Marcos Villalobo
- Esteban Peicovich
- Luis Hernández
- Gustavo Béliz
- Héctor Vega Onesime
- Orlando Ríos

=== Photographers ===
- Alberto Palazzo (Garabito) (1919–47)
- Usaburo Kikuchi (1928–57)
- Antonio Legarreta (1948–80)
- Ricardo Alfieri (1936–80s)

== Legacy ==
El Gráfico is widely the most regarded sports magazine in Argentina and Latin America. The magazine was nicknamed La Biblia del deporte ("The Bible of sports") due to its chronicles, notable journalists and collaborators and its photographies.

The magazine famously underlined creole-style football as opposed to the British style of football that had been introduced to Argentina in the late 19th century. It was baptised La Nuestra ("Our Own"). Researcher Eduardo Archetti stated about that:

The "criollo" style is based on elegance and improvisation while the British expresses force and discipline. This opposite values are featured as alternative styles which reflect different masculine virtues.

When the printed edition of El Gráfico was closed, some former collaborators and journalists left their impressions on that:

The 1990s destroyed culture in Argentina, or at least, a significant part of it. And that shattering also blown over the habit of reading

— Diego Fucks, former collaborator of the magazine, about the closure of El Gráfico

When El Gráfico was acquired by "Torneos", the magazine lost credibility

— Ernesto Cherquis Bialo, longtime collaborator of the magazine in an interview in January 2018

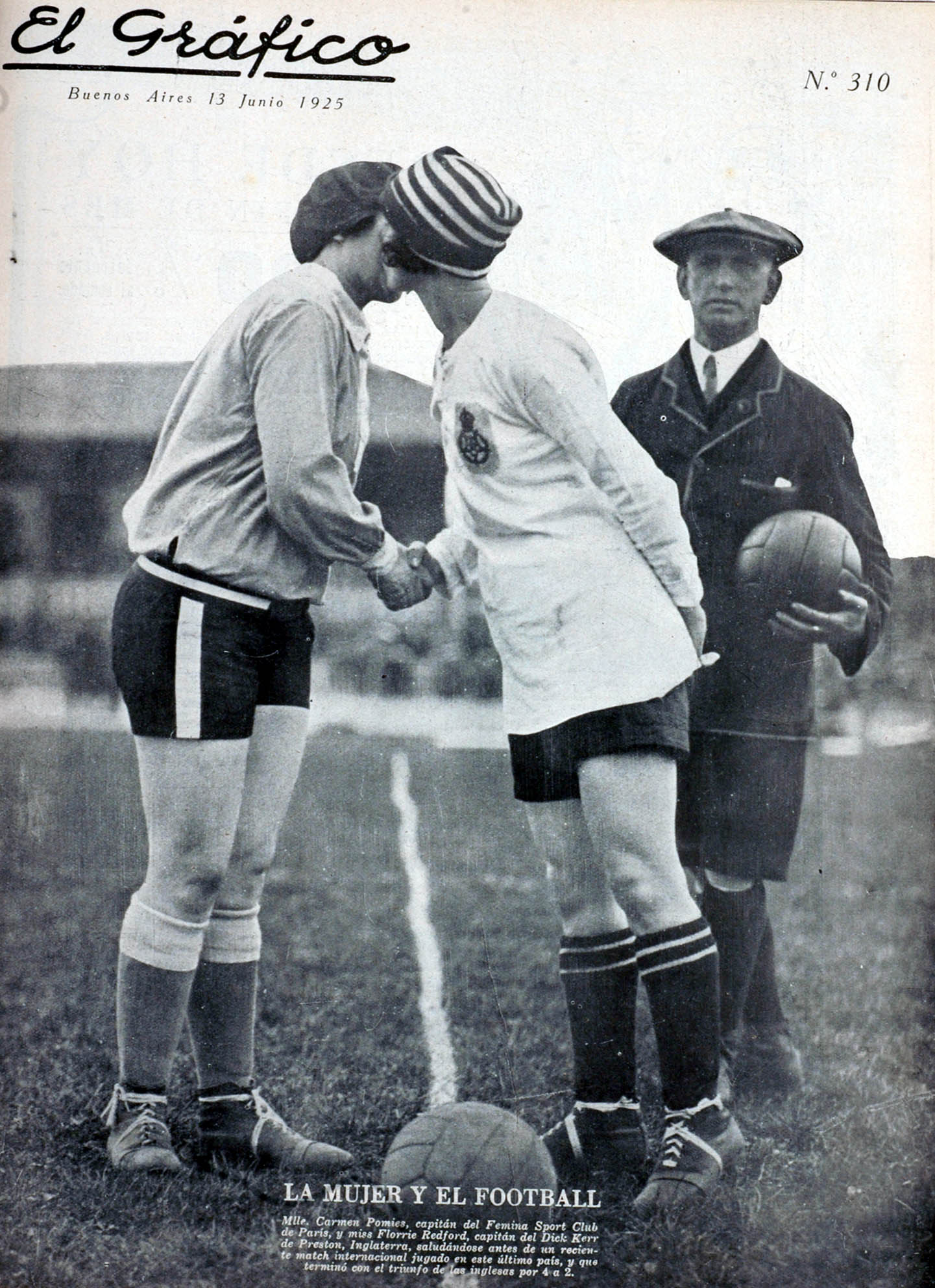
A cover of El Gráfico magazine depicts French footballer Carmen Pomiès, left, kissing English footballer Florrie Redford before a match in 1925.

Not only was El Gráfico popular for those reasons, but it had a significant impact on the role of women in sports. Before the beginning of the twentieth century both girls and women were not given the same amount of exposure in the media as men were. Their chances and abilities to play were hindered as they were overshadowed by the male-dominated world of media and sport. Fortunately, after major changes to women's uniforms were implemented by the 1920s, El Gráfico played a key role in the creation of new images of women and sports. Throughout this time period the magazine published many photographs of women athletes. In 1919 the third edition featured women tennis players on the cover, and throughout the 1930s about 15 percent of El Gráfico's front cover pages featured women. The magazine not only displayed the women in action playing on the fields, but it featured their accomplishments within the contents of the pages. Another way it aided in displaying these women was by identifying the women's club memberships. Although a small and simple act, this highlighted their participation in the sporting community on a larger scale.

This all helped to "normalize the idea of sportswomen", as El Gráfico "presented women as active subjects instead of passive objects and highlighted their physical prowess instead of only their beauty", ultimately disrupting the visual culture of Argentina in the 1920s and 1930s. Despite the fact that this amount of exposure still represented a minority compared to that of men at the time, it is still considered a breakthrough as this representation exceeded that of any similar publication in Argentina and beyond.

== Gallery ==
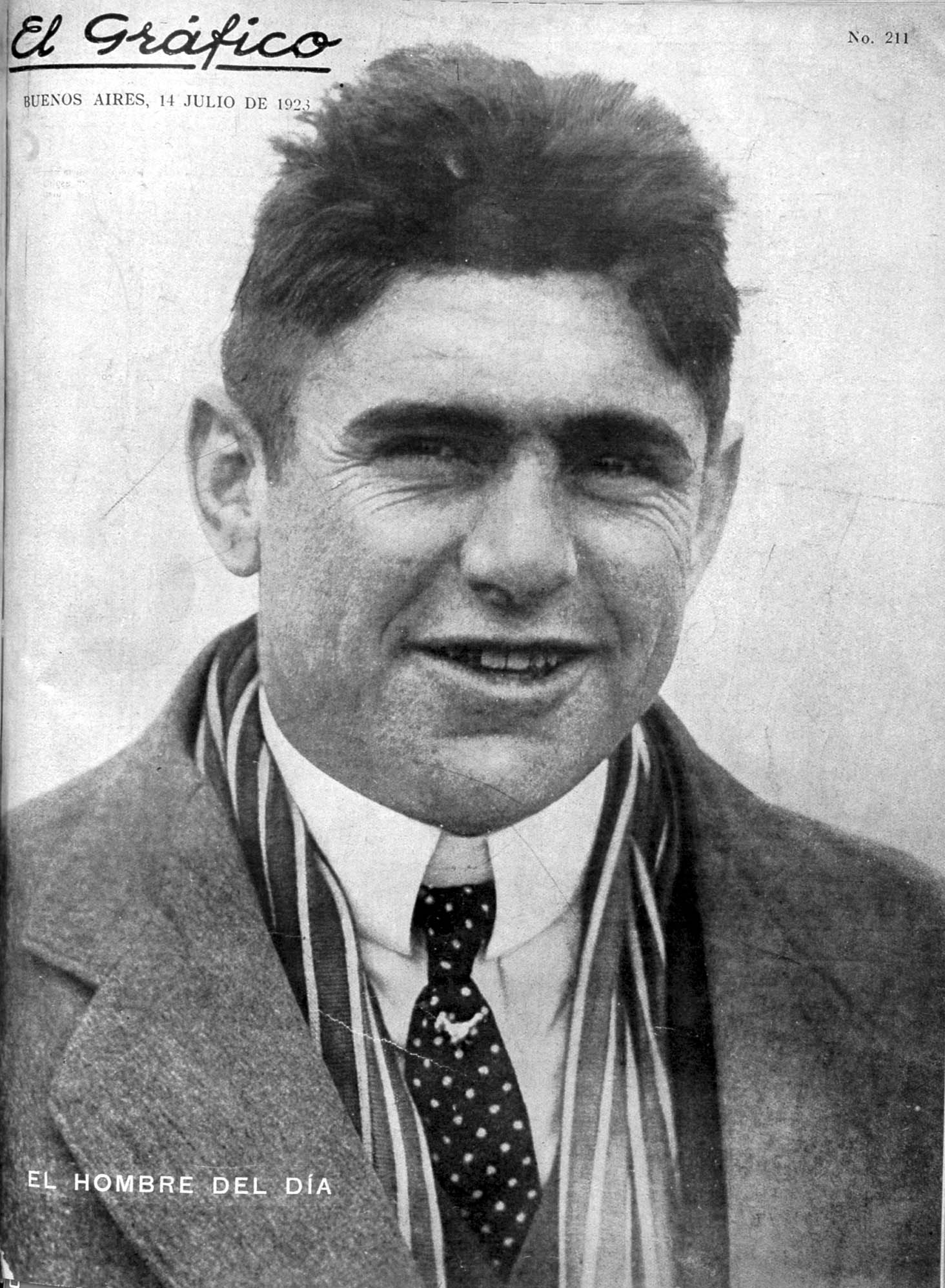
Luis Angel Firpo

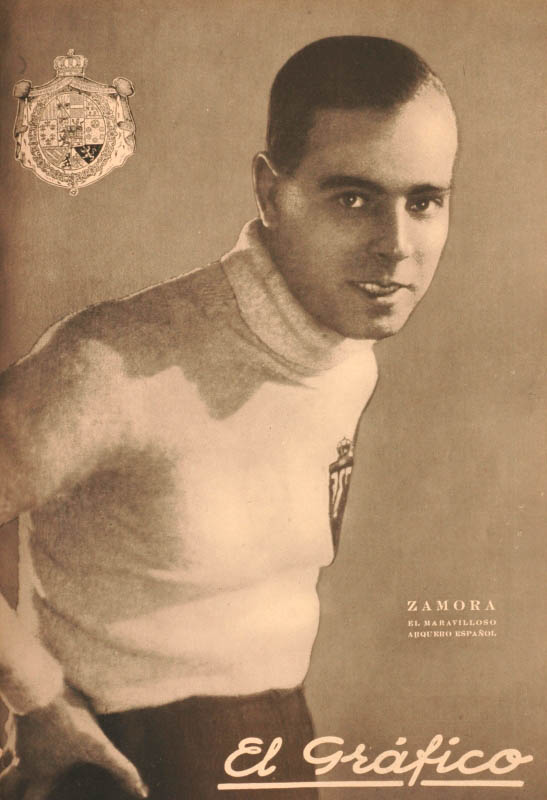
Ricardo Zamora

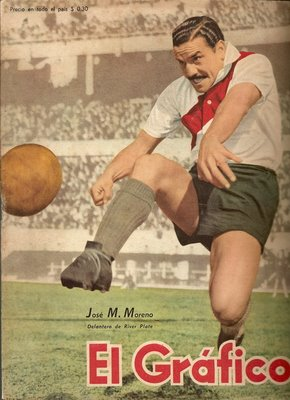
José M. Moreno

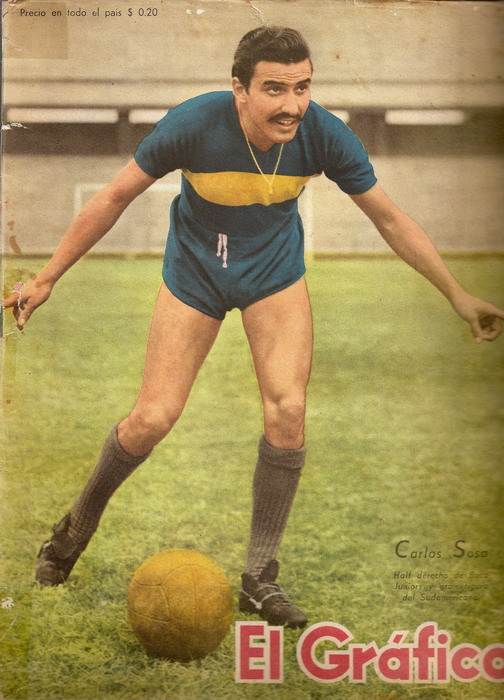
Carlos Sosa

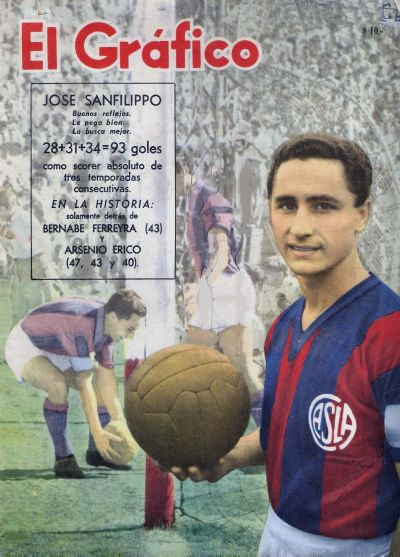
José Sanfilippo

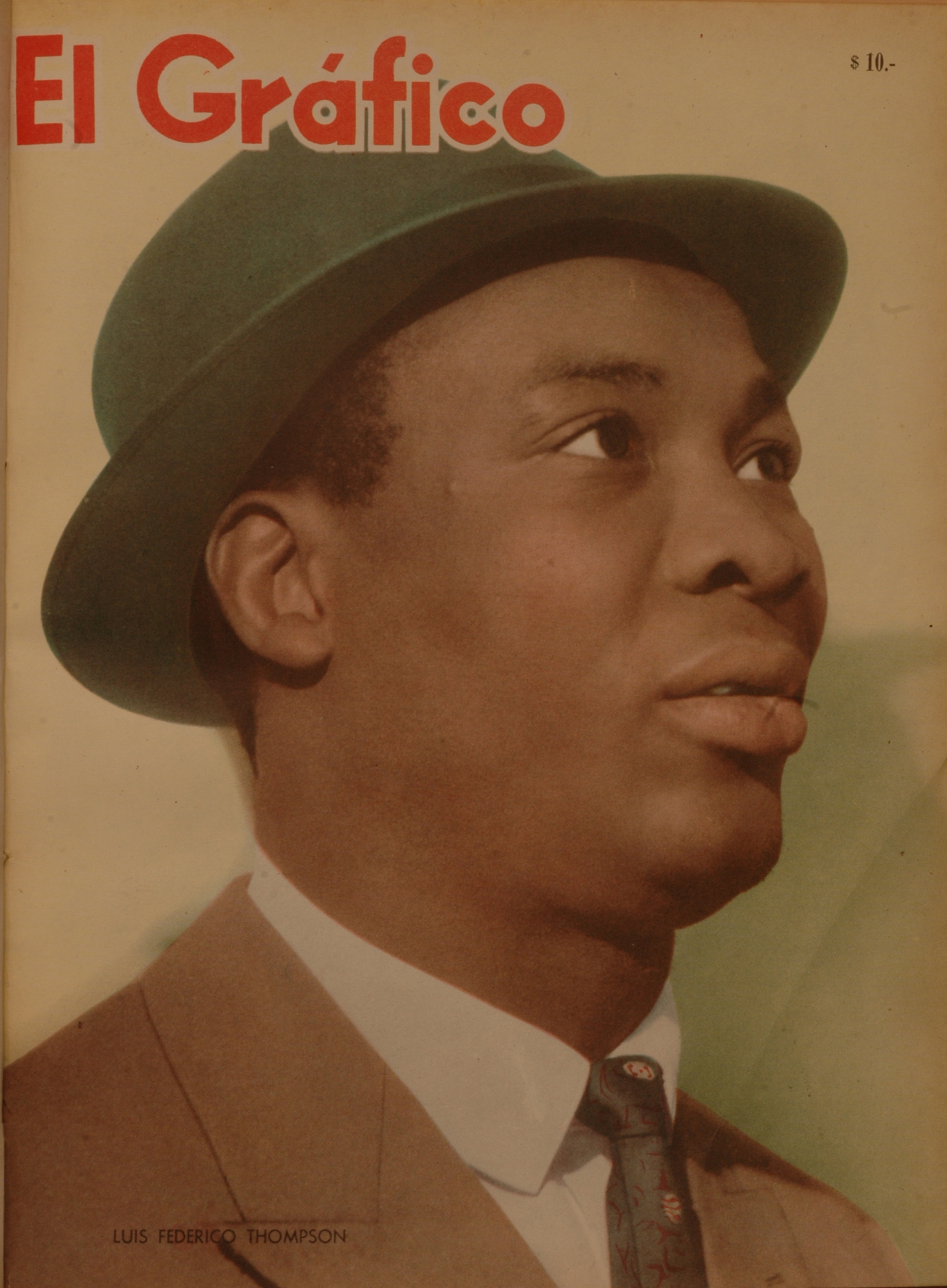
Luis Federico Thompson

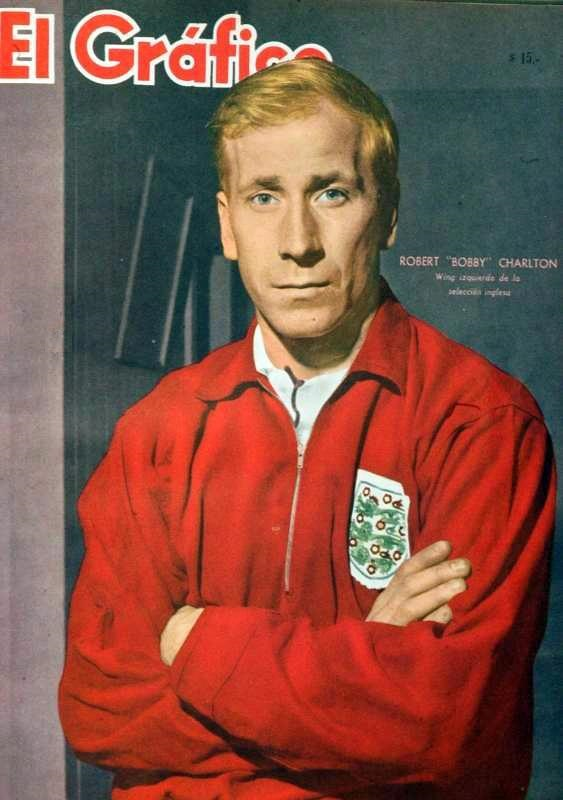
Bobby Charlton
