= Pepe Peña =

Argentine football manager

José Gabriel González Peña (died 1980) was an Argentine journalist and football manager.

== Early life ==
As a youth player, Peña joined the youth academy of Argentine side All Boys.

== Career ==
Peña has been described as "one of the most renowned journalists" in Argentine during the 1960s.

== Personal life ==
Peña was the father of actor Fernando Peña.
