= Editorial Haynes =

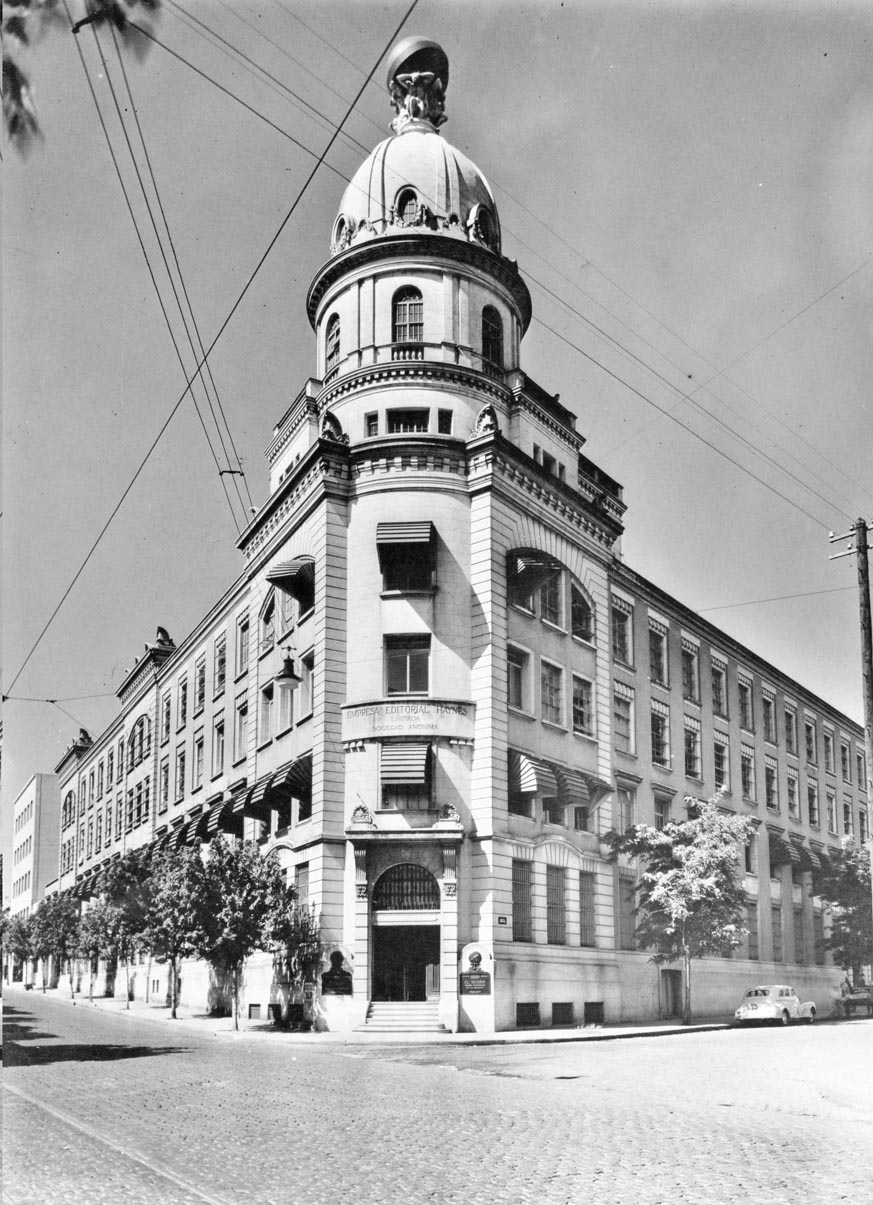
- Editorial Haynes building as seen in 1954
- Status: Defunct
- Founded: 1904
- Defunct: late 1960s
- Country of origin: Argentina
- Headquarters location: Buenos Aires
- Distribution: Argentina
- Publication types: Magazines, newspaper
- Nonfiction topics: Society, sports, agriculture, humor, politics, science, film, radio
- Imprints: List: El Hogar; Mundo Argentino; Don Goyo; Riqueza Argentina; El Mundo; Sintonía; Tía Vicenta; Mundo Deportivo; Mundo Agrario; Mundo Infantil; Mundo Radial; Mundo Atómico; PBT; Mundo Peronista
- Owner: Alberto Haynes

Editorial Haynes was an Argentine publishing company founded by Alberto M. Haynes in 1904. The publisher released several magazines such as El Hogar, Mundo Deportivo, Mundo Argentino, Mundo Agrario, Mundo Infantil, and newspaper El Mundo, among other imprints.

Its building was located on Rio de Janeiro and Bogotá in Almagro, Buenos Aires. In 1948 the Grupo ALEA, managed by peronist official Carlos Aloe took over the control of Editorial Haynes after acquiring 51% of the company shares. When the coup d'etat named Revolución Libertadora ended the second presidential term of Juan Perón, Editorial Haynes' building and assets were expropriated by the Military Government. Some of its collaborators had to exiliate in Mexico.

Being one of the largest publishers in Latin America at its time, Editorial Haynes is regarded as one of the milestones of the Argentine publishing industry.

== History ==
=== Beginning ===
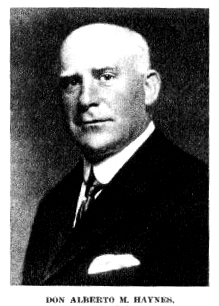
Alberto M. Haynes, founder of the company

Roots to the publishing company can be traced in a meeting between Alberto Haynes (an English immigrant to Argentina in 1887 who had worked at the Buenos Aires Western Railway) and Ricardo Claudio Magnussen, his professor at the Buenos Aires English High School. During that meeting Haynes agreed to buy Magnussen an old Minerva printing machine so he had the idea of publishing a magazine intended for a family audience. His wish was fulfilled when he released El Consejero del Hogar (then simply El Hogar) in 1904. Published fortnightly, the magazine was not well received at first so Haynes gave it a new direction with a focus on the upper class. As a result, El Hogar showed customs and habits of the most traditional families of Argentina, including their trips, weddings, parties, and social events. This change of direction caused the magazine to be a total success, becoming the most sold magazine in the country so many people recognised themselves in the topics featured on it. El Hogar was also the first imprint to feature colors on its covers.

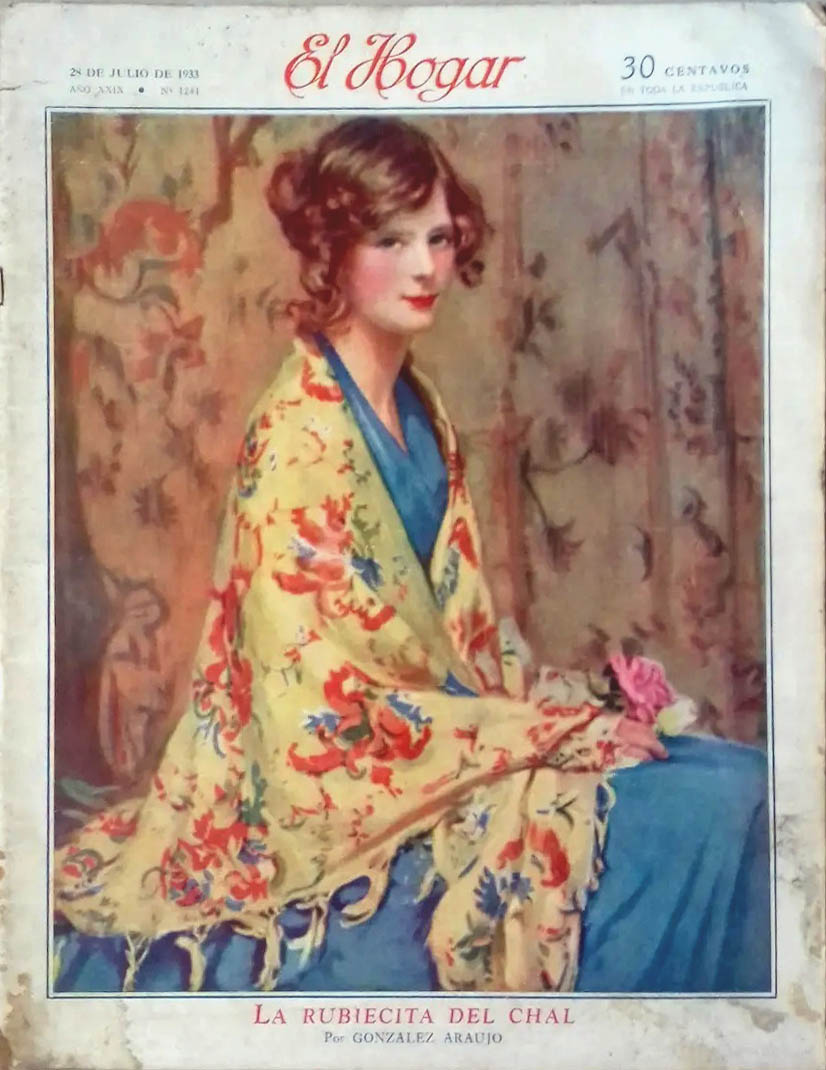
El Hogar was the first magazine released, in 1904, with a long tenure that extended to mid-1950s

Following the success of El Hogar, Haynes released other imprints such as Mundo Argentino, directed by Constancio C. Vigil before founding his own publishing brand, "Editorial Atlántida" with the release of El Gráfico, Mundo Agrario (agriculture), Mundo Infantil (children), and Mundo Deportivo (sports).

In December 1923, Editorial Haynes inaugurated its headquarters on Rio de Janeiro and Bogotá street in Buenos Aires. The building was then renovated, adding modern printing machines with advanced technology. Two years later, the first humor magazine by Haynes, Don Goyo, is released. Directed by Conrado Nalé Roxlo, it was the first media where Roberto Arlt collaborated.

On May 14, 1928, Haynes released its first newspaper, El Mundo, a tabloid-size newspaper that covered national and international news. Directed by Carlos Muzio Sáenz Peña, it was plenty of photographs and illustrations, also featuring comic strips on its backcover. Offered at a low price (half the price that its competitors) El Mundo became an immediate success. To attract readers, the newspaper also had weekly contests (generally related to results of Primera División matches), awarding prizes of M$N1,000 to winners. Roberto Arlt (who had been previously collaborated in Don Goyo) wrote his famous "Aguafuertes Porteñas" in the pages of El Mundo.

On June 21, 1929, Alberto Haynes died, being succeeded by his son in law Henry Wesley Smith, who would manage the company until the beginning of the first Juan Perón's presidency. At its peak, Editorial Haynes employed 3,000 people.

=== Expansion to radio ===
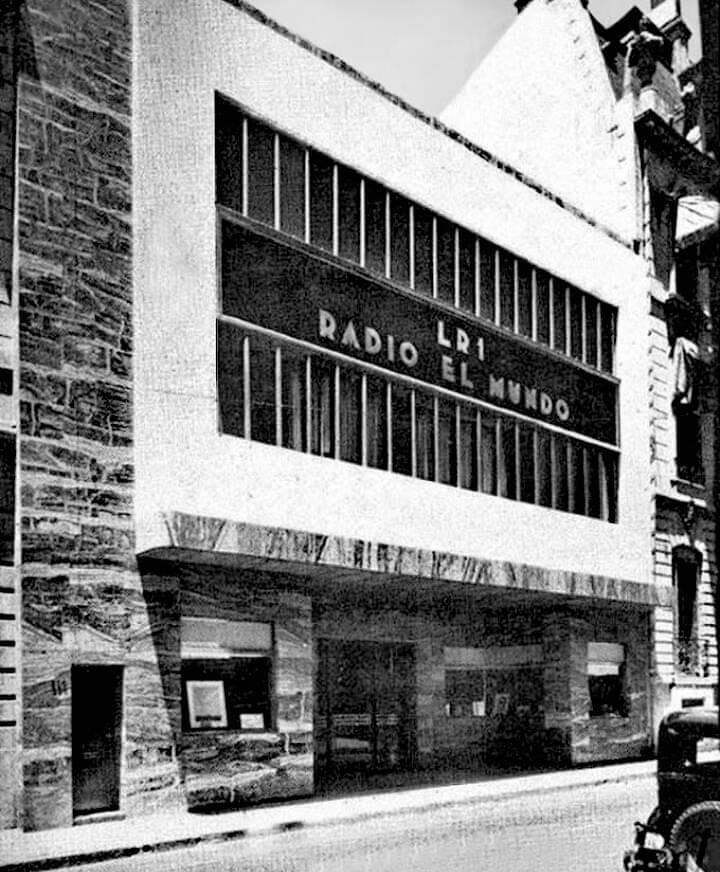
Radio El Mundo building on Maipú 555 in Buenos Aires, currently seat of state-owned Radio Nacional

El Mundo brand expanded to radio broadcasting, founding "Radio El Mundo" in 1935, Therefore El Mundo became the first massive media company of Argentina. To host the radio studios, Haynes built a building on Maipú street. It had seven rooms and two auditoriums for 500 people each. Radio El Mundo's staff included an orchestra that played live during some programs. The radio had a hetereogeneus scheduling that included classic music, jazz, and tango, with some programs that became famous such as "Glostora Tango Club", or "Radio Show", broadcast live with public attending to it. El Mundo also broadcast live the Primera División football matches and boxing matches at Estadio Luna Park.

Broadcasting live abroad Argentina through radio stations in other provinces of Argentina, some of the most popular artists of that time that contributed to El Mundo were actors Niní Marshall, Luis Sandrini, Lola Membrives, Zully Moreno, Narciso Ibáñez Menta, while notable speakers/announcers were Juan Carlos Thorry, Antonio Carrizo, and Cacho Fontana, among others. Musicians and singers performing live were Aníbal Troilo, Alfredo De Angelis, Atahualpa Yupanqui, Los Chalchaleros. El Mundo also broadcast radio dramas (a popular genre at those times), with "Los Pérez García" (broadcast from 1942 to 1967) becoming one of its most popular and legendary.

=== Influence of Peronism ===
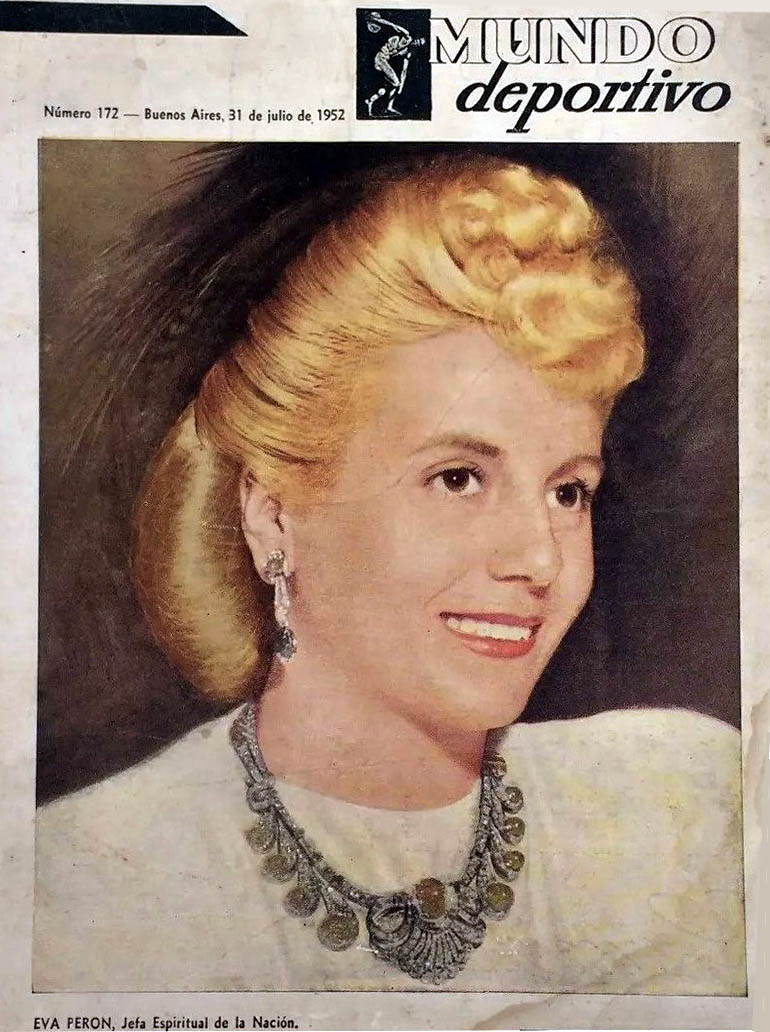
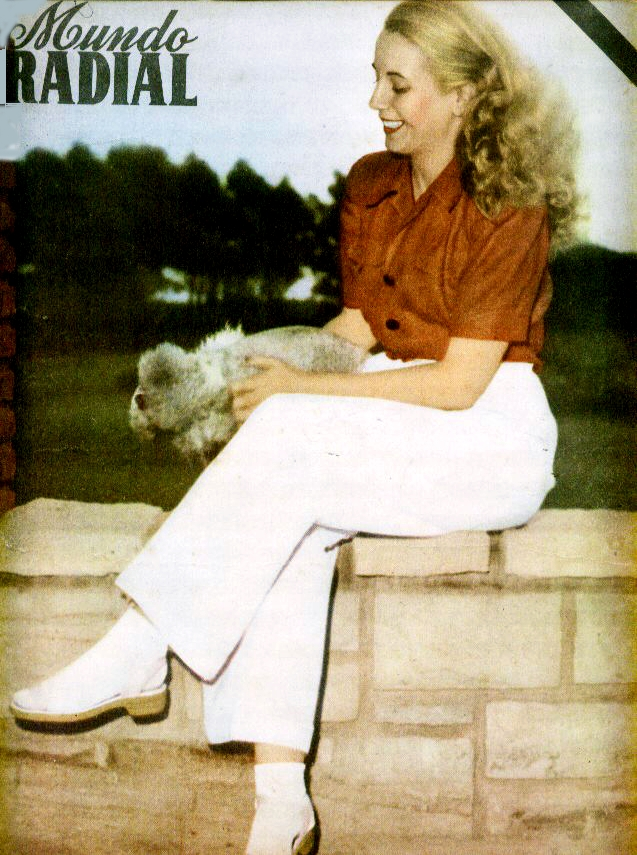
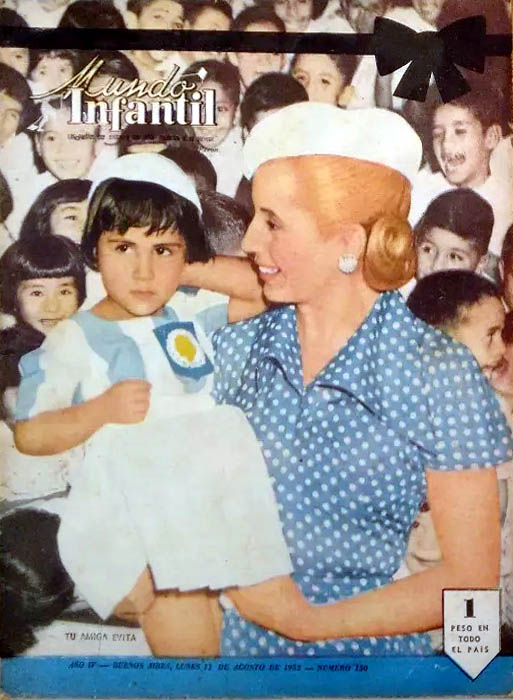
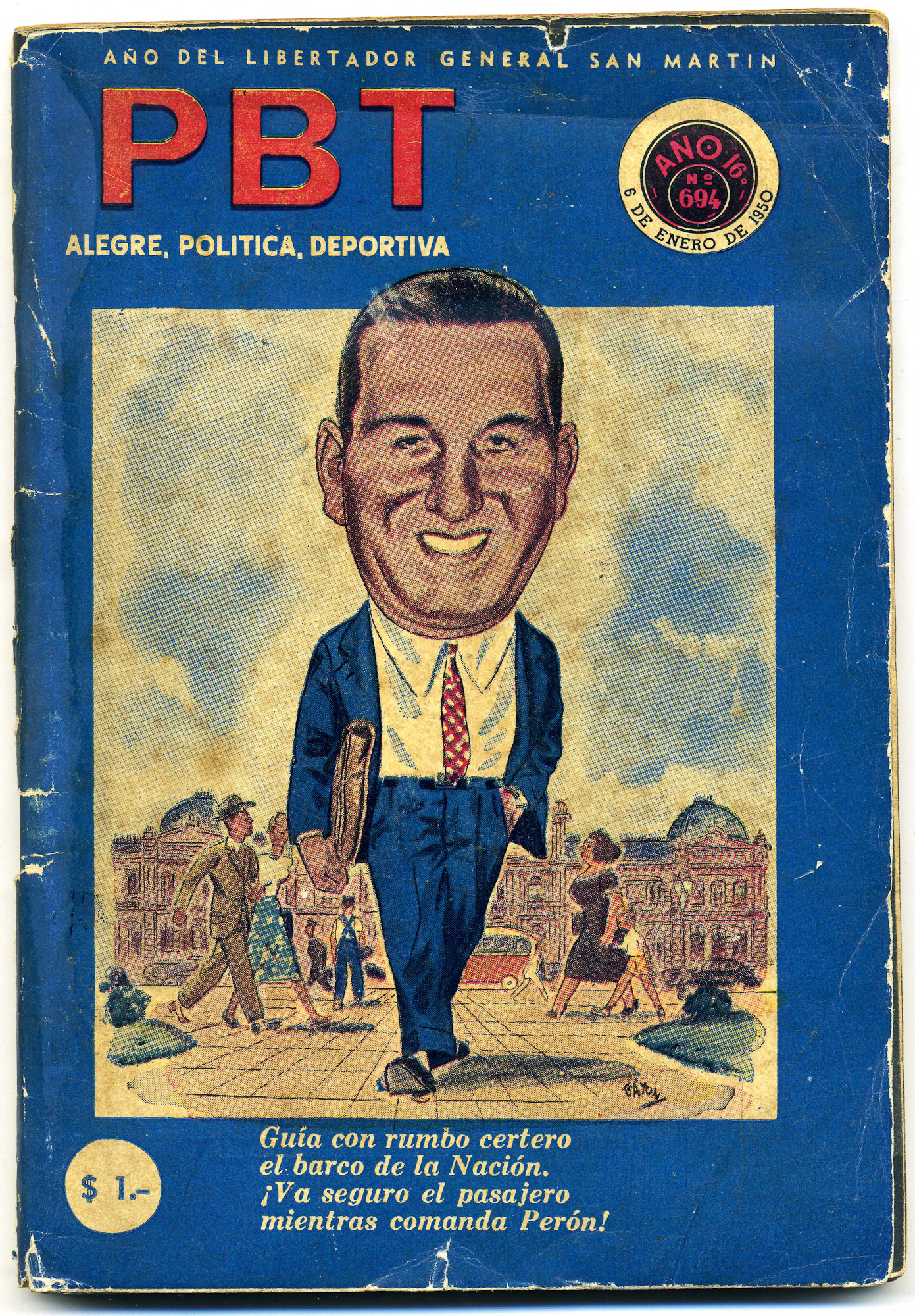
Since the Juan Perón government took over Editorial Haynes, the influence of peronism propaganda reached its magazines. p.e. Eva Perón displayed on Mundo Deportivo, Mundo Radial, and Mundo Infantil, and Juan Perón on PBT covers

In 1947, the government administration led by Perón, in an attempt to control the media, bought some newspapers, as well as revoking concessions granted to several radio stations, some of which would be later given to private entrepreneurs with close ties with the officialism. In the case of Editorial Haynes, Well Smith accepted the offer from Grupo ALEA (led by Carlos Aloe, a government official), selling 51% of the family business. El Mundo and all the Hayes' imprints were taken over by the National Secretary of Communications. Under this new direction, the editorial line of Editorial Hayes' publications switched to direction with stronger ties with peronism. To support the ideological recruitment, Haynes released new publications such as Mundo Peronista, also re-issuing P.B.T. (a magazine that had had a first run between 1904 and 1918, originally as a political satire magazine). Under Perón administration, P.B.T. (which second run started in January 1950) became a booklet of political propaganda used by peronism.

Under the new management, Haynes expanded its portfolio with new magazines launched in 1949: Mundo Deportivo, focused on sports (mainly football), in a similar format that other sports magazines of that time such as El Gráfico or Goles. Apart from national sports coverage, the magazine also included several articles related to "Torneos Evita", youth-oriented sports competitions promoted by the Eva Perón Foundation. The magazine was published until 1959.

Also in 1949, Haynes released Mundo Infantil, a children-oriented magazine with political content used by the Peronism as an attempt to ideologize them. The magazine was directed by Oscar Rubio, who also managed the sporting events "Torneos Evita". A total of 141 issues were published until June 1952. Some of its contents were illustrated tales, comic strips about historical personalities of Argentina. The magazine strongly focused on Peronism doctrine, with articles about the Eva Perón Foundation or the Torneos Evita, sports competitions for children.

Another Haynes' achievement was the publication of the first science and technology magazine in Argentina, Mundo Atómico. Released in 1950, the imprint featured covers illustrated in a modernist style, with a great amount of photographs and illustrations in its interior pages, also featuring some comic strips.

When the coup d'etat of 1955 overthrew Juan Perón, El Mundo was managed by the dictatorship until it was sold to an entrepreneur consortium. The newspaper closed definitely in December 1967.

=== Last years ===
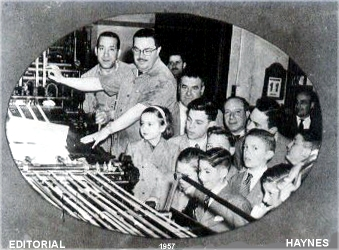
School students visiting Editorial Haynes, 1957

In 1960, Haynes began publicating Tía Vicenta, a political satire magazine created by caricature artist Juan Carlos Colombres, a.k.a. "Landrú", who had worked at the publisher as illustrator on Diario El Mundo. The magazine had been launched in 1957 by Editorial NOPRA. Tía Vicenta became highly popular, being one of the most influential magazines of its genre. In 1970, the magazine was regarded as one of the six best political and military humor magazines in the world. Haynes published the magazine as a supplement to El Mundo newspaper, with 500,000 copies printed. After then de facto president of Argentina Juan Carlos Onganía was depicted as a walrus (a nickname given due to his big moustache), the dictatorship closed the magazine in July 1966.

From March 1965 to December 1967, cartoonist Quino published his most famous comic strip, Mafalda, on El Mundo newspaper. The character had been created for Mansfield, a home appliance company, being first published on Gregorio –a supplement to Leoplán magazine– in 1964.

In the late 1960s, Editorial Haynes declared bankruptcy, with all its assets and building auctioned in 1971. The building on Río de Janeiro and Bogotá was later demolished.

== Publications ==
Some of the magazines and newspapers edited by Editorial Haynes were:

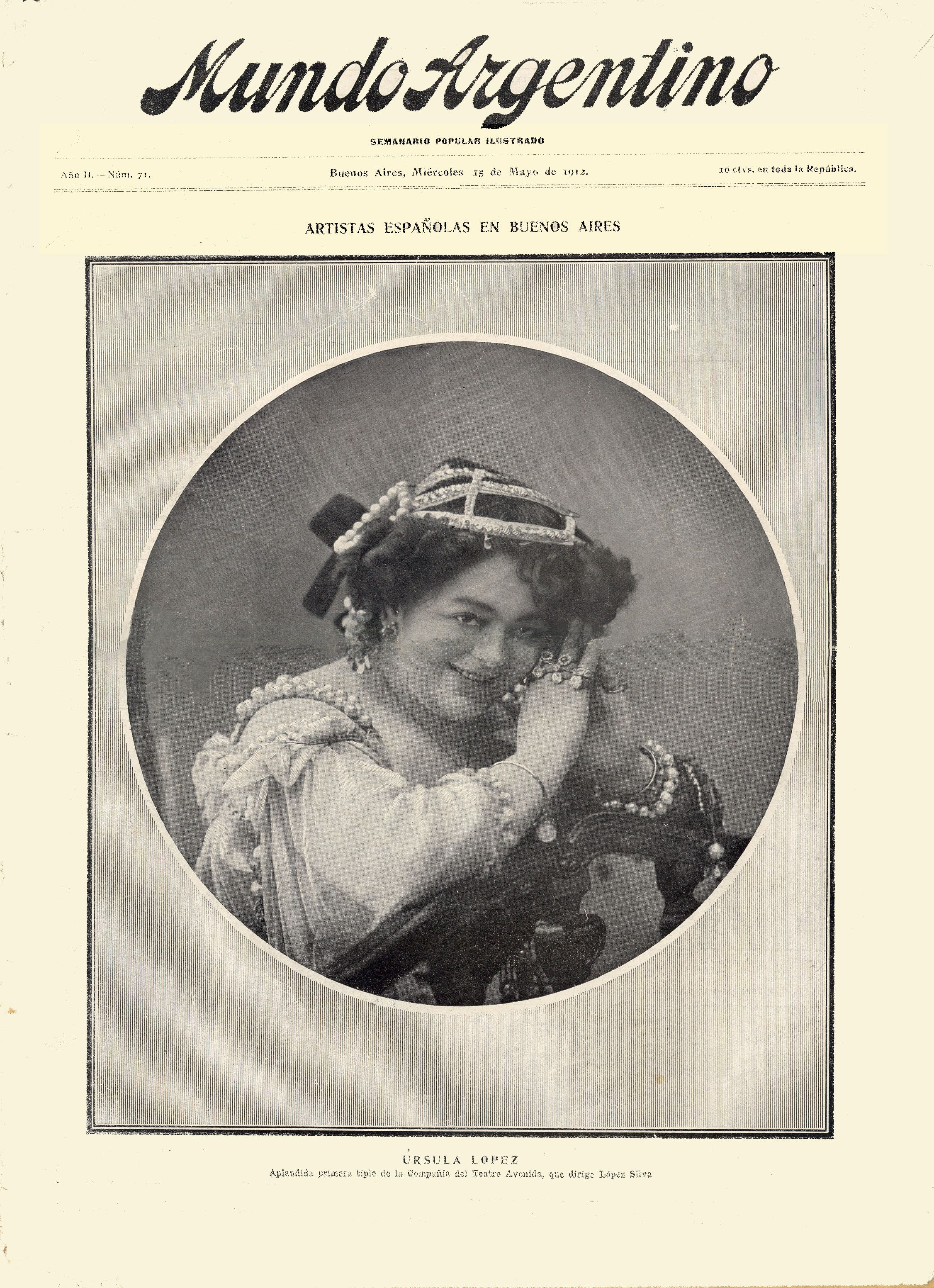
Mundo Argentino, 1912

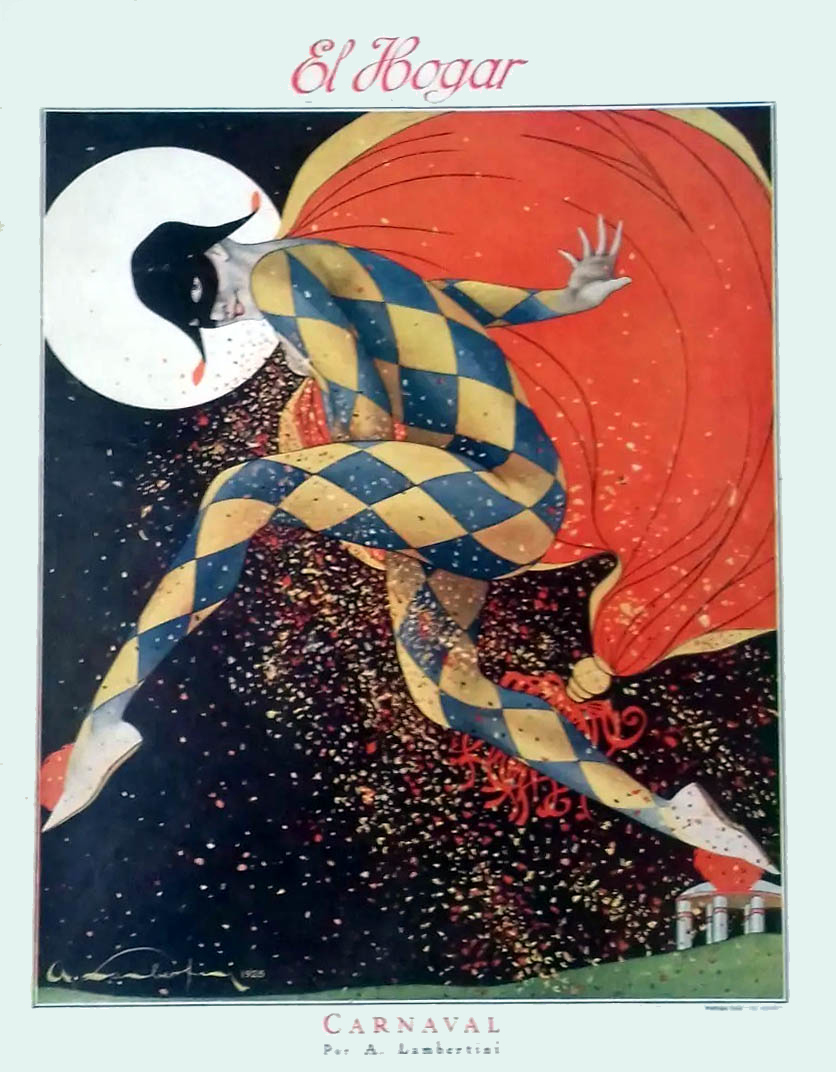
El Hogar, 1933

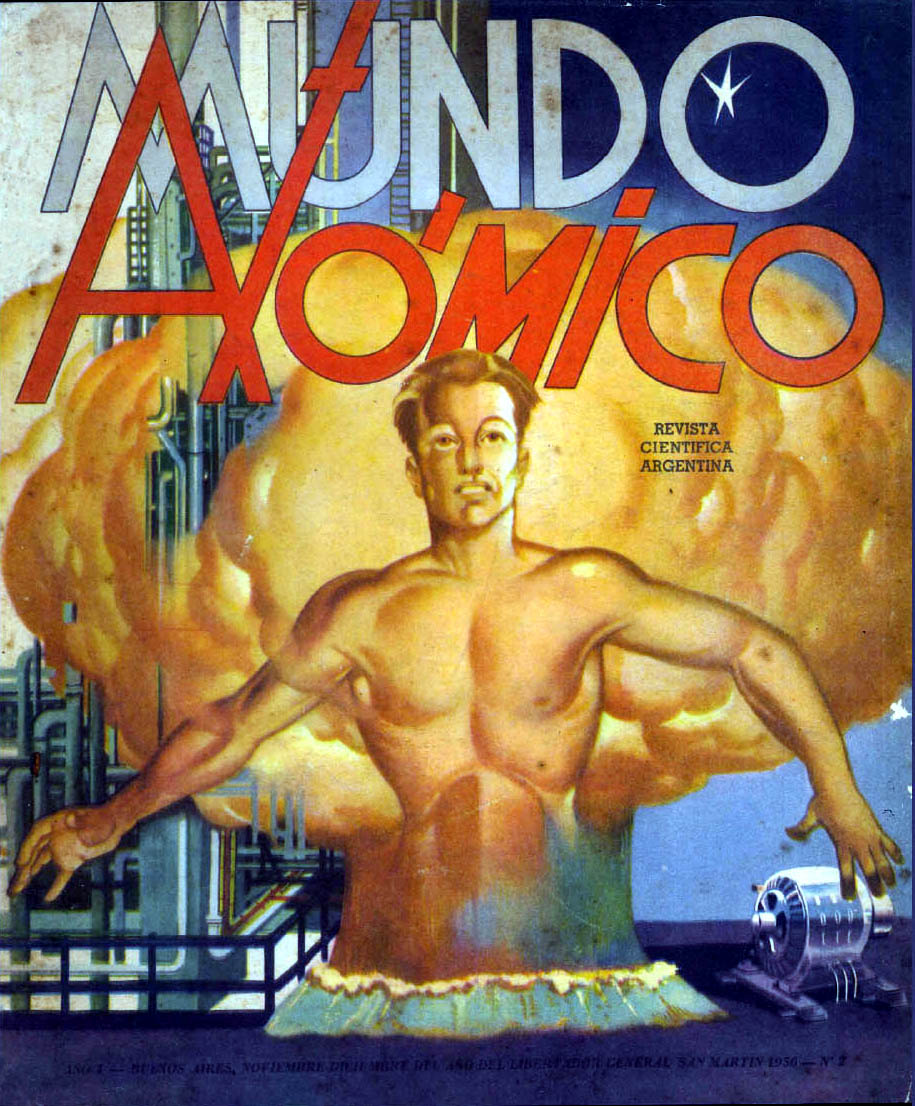
Mundo Atómico #2, 1950

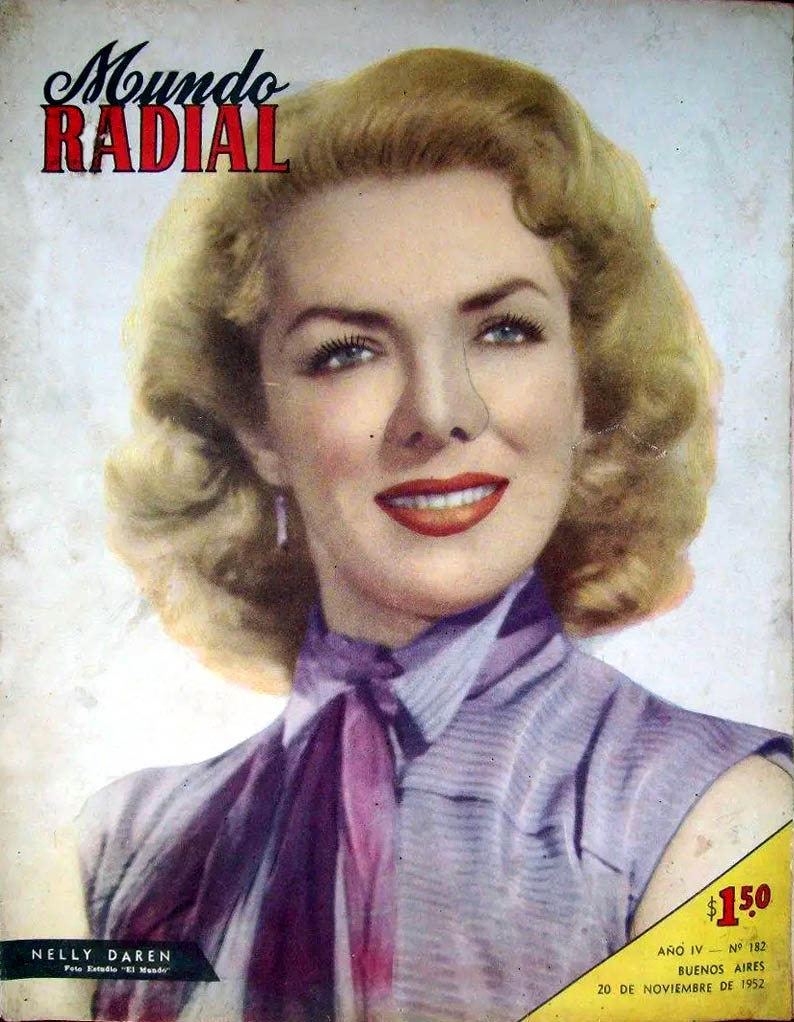
Mundo Radial, 1952

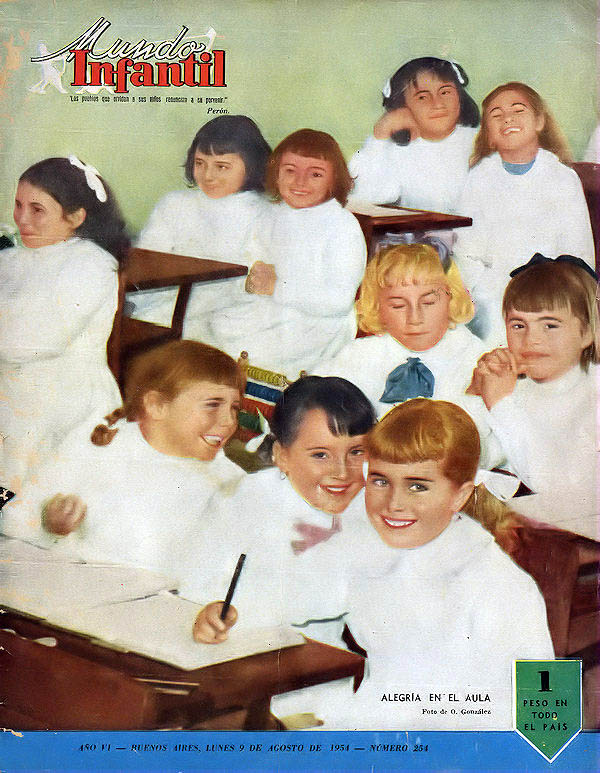
Mundo Infantil, 1954

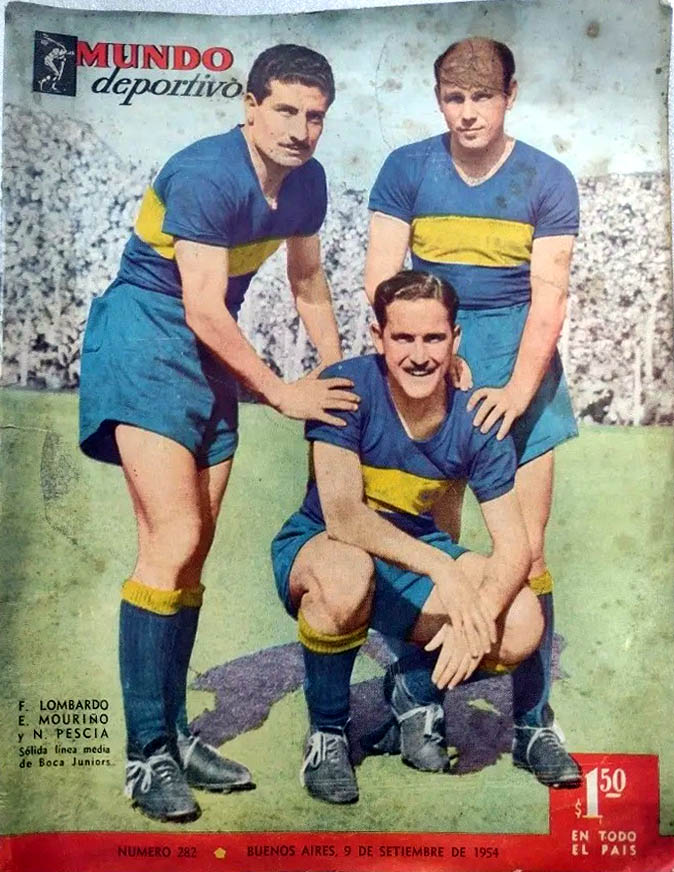
Mundo Deportivo #282, 1954

Name	Topics	Tenure
El Hogar (Note: originally, El Consejero del Hogar)	Society	1904–63
Mundo Argentino	Society	1911–?
Don Goyo	Humor	1925–?
Riqueza Argentina	Economy	1927–28
El Mundo	Newspaper	1928–67
Sintonía	Film, actors	1933–1950s
Tía Vicenta	Humor, political satire	1960–66
Mundo Deportivo	Sports	1949–59
Mundo Agrario	Agriculture, animal husbandry	1949–55
Mundo Infantil	Children	1949–56
Mundo Radial	Film, actors	1949–57?
Mundo Atómico	science and technology	1950–55
PBT (Note: Only the second run was published by Haynes.)	Humor, political satire	1950–55
Mundo Peronista	Peronism supporting	1951–55

== Famous contributors ==
Some notable journalists and writers that left their contributions on the Editorial Haynes' imprints were:

- Jorge Luis Borges (El Hogar, 1936–39)
- Roberto Arlt (El Mundo, Don Goyo)
- Ulises Barrera
- Bernardo Neustadt
- Quino (Tía Vicenta, El Mundo)
- Alberto Gerchunoff (El Mundo)
- Ernesto Sabato
- Horacio Pagani (El Mundo)
- Jacobo Timerman
- Horacio Verbitsky
- Conrado Nalé Roxlo
- Amado Villar (Note: Spanish writer and poet.)
- Aldo R. Vaselli
- Roger Pla (Note: Argentine writer and movie critic (1912–1982).)
