= Bernardo Neustadt =

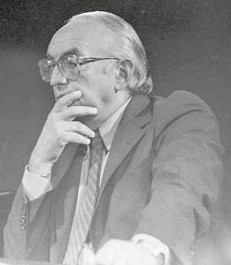
Bernardo Neustadt in 1987

Bernardo Neustadt (Spanish: [beɾˈnaɾðo ˈnojstat], German: [ˈnɔʏʃtat]; January 9, 1925 – June 7, 2008) was a Romanian-born Argentine journalist. For 30 years he was the TV host of the famous Tiempo Nuevo (English: New Time) news program.

Neustadt was the first to make political opinion journalism on television in Argentina. During the military dictatorship and democratic governments of Raúl Alfonsín and Carlos Menem, he was one of the most influential political journalists in Argentina.

He was born on January 9, 1925, in Iași, Romania, while his father worked at the Argentine Embassy in Bucharest. Six months later, the family settled in Argentina. Between 6 and 13 years old, Neustadt was raised as a "ward" in Catholic boarding schools. After his mother died when he was 13 he moved with his father, who later expelled him from the house.

At 14 years old, he joined the Editorial Haynes, owner of the newspaper El Mundo. He worked as a sportswriter and directed Racing magazine.

He died in Martinez, Buenos Aires, Argentina.

== TV news program ==
For 30 years between 1966 and 1997 he was the host of the Tiempo Nuevo (English: New Time) news program. His ratings reached 30 points, the highest news program on Argentine TV. In later years he split with Mariano Grondona and changed the program's name to Al Estilo de Bernardo Neustadt.

== Interviews ==
Notable interviewees include:

- Charles de Gaulle - French president
- David Ben-Gurion - Israeli prime minister
- David Rockefeller - American businessman and philanthropist
- Juan Domingo Perón - Argentinian president
- Francisco Franco - Spanish president
- António de Oliveira Salazar - Portuguese prime minister
- Arturo Frondizi - Argentinian president
- Jorge Luis Borges - Argentinian writer
- Raúl Ricardo Alfonsín - Argentinian president
- Carlos Saúl Menem - Argentinian president
- Alberto Fujimori - Peruvian president
- Henry Kissinger - US Secretary of State
- Mikhail Gorbachev - Soviet president
- Yasser Arafat - Palestinian governor
- Shimon Peres - Israeli prime minister
- Yitzhak Rabin - Israeli prime minister
- Pope John XXIII
- Arthur Miller - US writer
- José María Aznar - Spanish prime minister
- Néstor Kirchner - Argentinian president
- Cristina Kirchner - Argentinian president
- Irineo Leguisamo - Uruguayan jockey
- Felipe González - Spanish prime minister
- Colin Powell - US General
- Saburo Okita - Japanese foreign relations minister
- Michael Porter - Management guru
- Fernando Henrique Cardoso - Brazilian president
- George Bush - US president
- Bill Gates - US businessman and philanthropist
- Gary Becker - Nobel Prize recipient
- Rudi Dornbusch - economist
- Regis McKenna - marketer
- Lee Iacocca - former CEO of Ford
- Mario Vargas Llosa - Nobel Prize recipient
- Tom Peters - Management guru
