= The Ballad of the Salty Sea =

1967–69 graphic novel by Hugo Pratt

The Ballad of the Salty Sea (Una ballata del mare salato)
- The geographical extent of Melanesia, action area of this story
- Series: Corto Maltese
- Publisher: Casterman

Creative team
- Creator: Hugo Pratt

Original publication
- Published in: 1967–1969
- ISBN: 978-1-68405-641-5

Chronology
- Followed by: Under the Sign of Capricorn

The Ballad of the Salty Sea is a graphic novel, the first episode of the adventures of Corto Maltese, a Maltese sailor. This story was written and drawn by the Italian comic book creator Hugo Pratt. It was published for the first time between 1967 and 1969, in the magazine Il Sergente Kirk. It takes place in Melanesia (Western Oceania), shortly before World War I, between 1913 and 1915. It introduces many important future characters to the series, such as the romantic Corto, the crazy Russian sailor Rasputin, and the young cousins Pandora and Cain.

== Overview ==
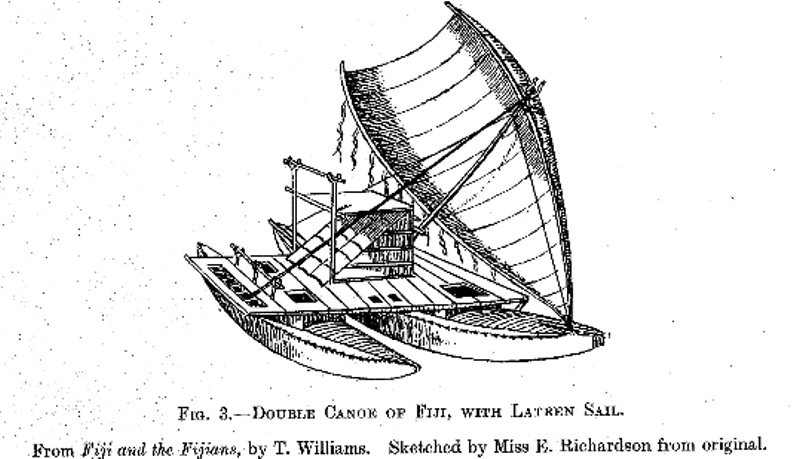
Former Fijian catamaran – 19th century

On October 31, 1913, the Pacific Ocean becomes calm after a terrible storm. Russian pirate Rasputin sails aboard a Fijian catamaran, when his second Cranio spots two young unconscious castaways in a lifeboat, off Bougainville Island (Solomon Islands). They are brought on board, Rasputin hoping to obtain a ransom from their family. After waking up, they explain that they are two cousins, Pandora and Cain Groovesnore. They were sailing aboard their yacht when it burned down, leaving them as the only survivors. Their family, Groovesnore, of Sydney (Australia), is an important dynasty at the head of the South Seas.

Under a beating sun, the crew later sees a man tied to a raft: the Maltese pirate Corto Maltese. Because he refused to marry a young woman when he had to, his crew mutinied against him and punished him with this torture. Rasputin, an accomplice of Corto's, agrees to take him on board. Together, they discuss their project to accomplish their mission, in the service of the "Monk", a mysterious pirate ruling the Pacific Ocean, whose identity is unknown.

Their mission is to loot coal ships of various nationalities on behalf of the German Empire. They eventually attack a Dutch cargo ship near Malaita and board a member of his crew, a young Maori sailor called Tarao.

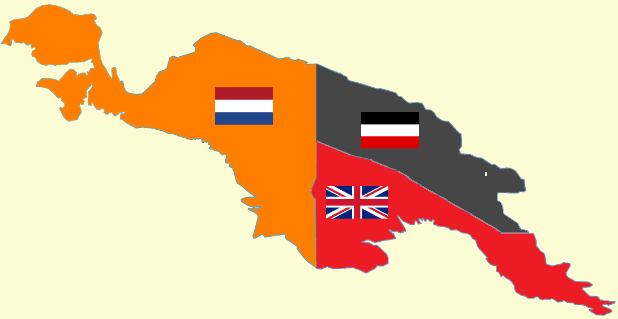
Political map of the island of New Guinea from 1884 to 1919 (the Kaiser-Wilhelmsland is to the northeast)

All of them sail together around Melanesians islands. At first, they go to Kaiserine (a German possession in New Guinea). There, the pirates discreetly meet their customer, Admiral Von Speeke. While Rasputin deals with the Germans, Corto keeps the catamaran on the Ottilien-Fluss (Ramu River), with the cousins, who are prisoners, and the crew. Then, they are victims of a storm and sink near the Sepik River.

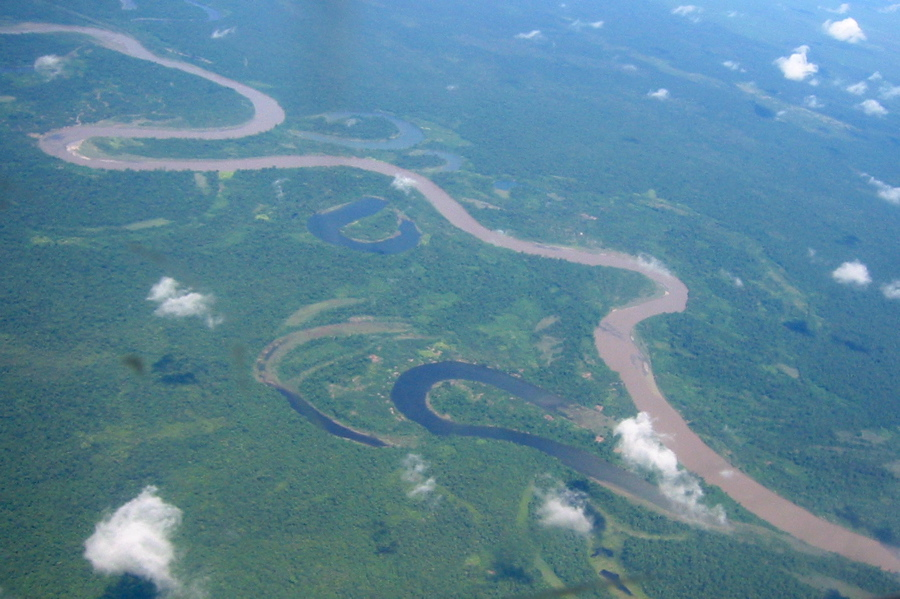
Ramu River, aerial photo

Corto and Pandora, who survive, hide in a cave. A dispute begins between them: furious, she shoots him, rendering him unconscious. Then, they are taken prisoner, with Tarao and Cain, by cannibal Seniks (Papuans). The Fijian Cranio later frees everyone, and they board a boat.

Finally, they are saved near the New Britain (Bismarck Archipelago) by German soldier Christian Slütter, in his submarine. Inside, they meet Rasputin and a Japanese sailor nicknamed Taki Jap. Together, they set a course for the hidden island of Escondida, the Monk's lair. The latter could be very old, trafficking for over one or two centuries.

On the spot, the Monk announces to his henchmen news dating from August 4, 1914: England declares war on Germany. Therefore, they themselves are also at war. He later hears about Pandora and Cain and seems interested in them. He also wants to protect and question them about their family. Likewise, he orders Rasputin to be responsible for their safety, over his life. Recently, Pandora was the victim of an accident and became unconscious. The Monk meets her and, after seeing her asleep, enters a crisis of dementia. He feels sad and alone: Maltese tries to support him.

Then, he decides to advance his departure, leaving with Slütter and Corto, whom he considering the latter his only friend. But by a new act of madness, he pushes Corto from the top of a cliff before leaving, believing him dead. Cranio is responsible for the management of the island during the Monk's absence and must closely monitor Rasputin.

The Fijian talks to Pandora and reveals that Corto is alive and is hiding in a shelter. The Monk is a former Protestant pastor, replacing another monk who once ruled this island. The latter trafficked in slaves (which earned him his excommunication), until he became ill with leprosy. After dying, he was replaced by the current monk. The natives relatively accept being led by him. Indeed, they are freer than other natives of Oceania, who are colonized.

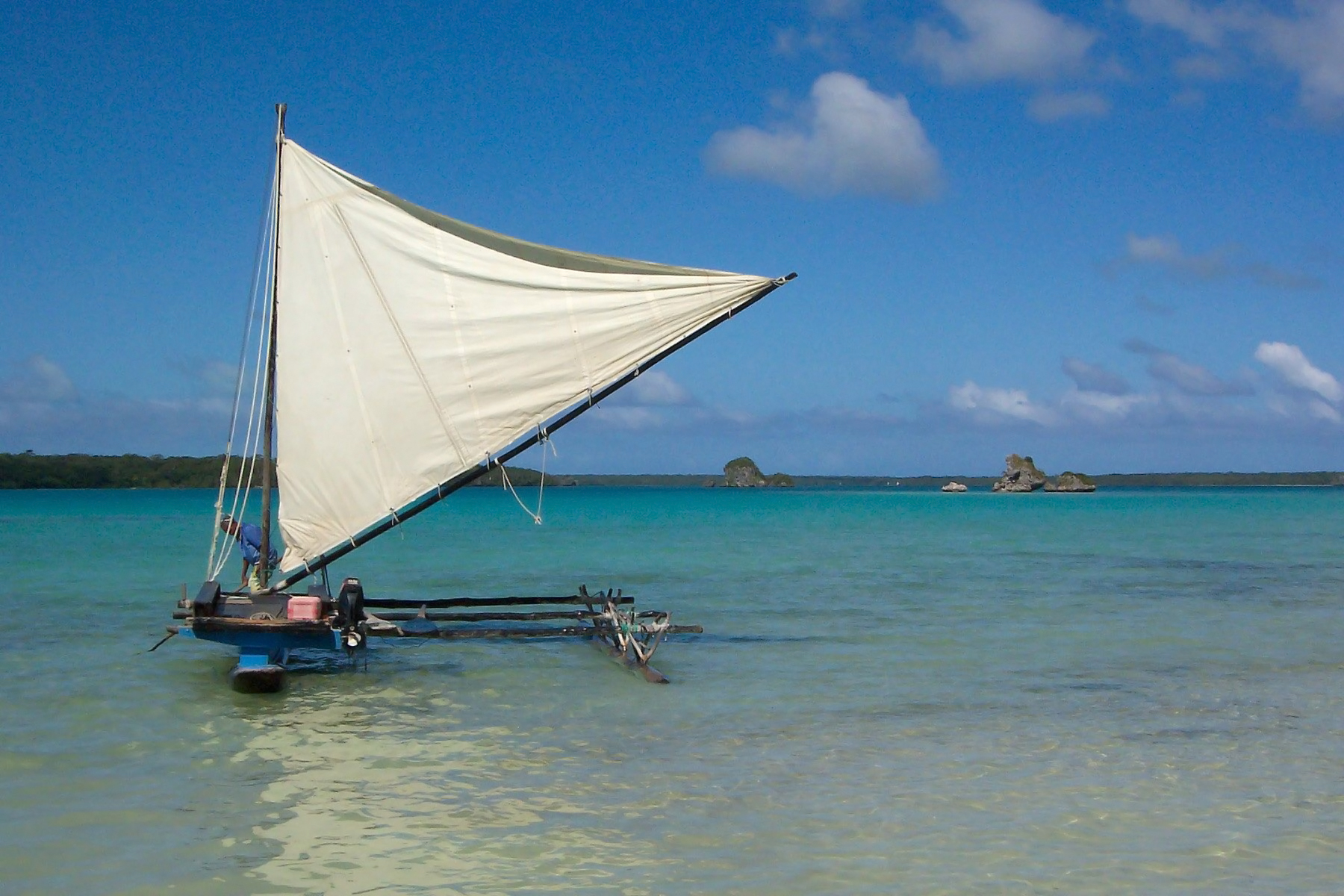
Traditional outrigger boat of L'Île-des-Pins, New Caledonia

Later, during a dispute, Rasputin kills Cranio. Meanwhile, Pandora embarks in an outrigger boat with Tarao, who uses his seafaring skills to seek help. Guided by the shark Mao, they arrive at Bura Nea island (Admiralty Islands) and meet New Zealand soldiers.

Gradually, the conflicts of World War I begin. The Australians and the Japanese discover the plans of the Germans. Rinald Groovesnore, Royal Australian Navy Officer and the cousins' uncle, was notified and arrived on Bura Nea. Thanks to Tarao and Pandora, he discovers Escondida. The Monk, informed by Corto of the departure of the cousins, supposes that his lair will be found. He then deserts the island by a submarine with Taki Jap. Before that, however, he tries to kill Slütter.

When Rinald Groovesnore arrives, everyone is arrested except the two fugitives, who managed to leave in time. The cousins testify positively in favor of Corto, who is thus pardoned. Rinald Groovesnore condemns Slütter to be executed despite attempts from the cousins to save him.

Rummaging through Slütter's belongings, Cain and Tarao discover a letter he addresses to Corto. He reveals a capital secret that could have saved him. He explains the Monk's identity and secrets. Slütter learned this during a delirium from the Monk. He is actually Thomas Groovesnore, Rinald's brother and Cain's uncle. Thomas passionately loved his lover Margretha, who eventually married his brother Tadee. During the ceremony, desperate, the man torched the house where the lovers had spent time and faked his death. She was expecting a baby from him but claimed that it came from Tadee. This baby was Pandora. This is why the Monk was protective of the cousins and went mad when he saw Pandora. Seeing in Pandora the face of Margretha, he felt tortured by his painful past. He wanted to kill Slütter, so that he would not reveal his secrets.

Affected by the execution of his friend Slütter, Corto tries to blackmail Rinald with the letter to avenge him. To create trouble for Rinald, Corto forced him to release Rasputin, also sentenced to death.

In January 1915, Corto greets Cain and Pandora, who leave aboard a destroyer. Tarao and Corto go away in his ketch, in the company of Rasputin. Together, they plan to cross the Pacific.

=== Characters ===
This episode features many characters, some of whom will reappear or be mentioned in later episodes:

- Cranio: Fijian sailor, who worked when he was young with a lawyer in Viti Levu (the largest island in the Republic of Fiji). This Rasputin's crew master has the Monk's confidence. He regrets seeing his people involved in the wars of the White people and aspires that the Melanesians finally unite. This would establish a Melanesian homeland, a similar claim among Polynesians.
- Rasputin: Russian pirate crisscrossing the Pacific on behalf of the Monk. He is greedy, ruthless, violent and fond of murder. He does not hesitate to assassinate people who get in his way. He often promises Corto that he will kill him one day. But deep down, he feels affection and shows loyalty to him, the person whom he considers his only friend. Thereafter, he will reappear in many other episodes of the series, being Maltese's best friend / enemy.
- Pandora and Cain Groovesnore: Main characters of this story, they come from the family dynasty ruling the South Seas, the Groovesnore, based on Sidney. Rinald Groovesnore, the vice admiral who commands the Royal Australian Navy fleet, is their uncle. Cain is British and Pandora is American. Their personality and their relationships with the other characters will evolve throughout the story. Hating Corto at first, he will become his friend, while she will have sentiments for him. Thereafter, Cain will return in the story Burlesque Between Zuydcoote and Bray-Dunes (in the volume Celtic Tales). While Pandora will only be mentioned and will only reappear in Corto's dreams (for example in The Golden House of Samarkand). Pandora Groovesnore owes her name to Pratt's acquaintance, the Australian Pandora Grosvenor, a ship-owner's daughter.
- Corto Maltese: Born in Malta, this sailor has traveled around the world. Due to various circumstances, he became a pirate, then began to work for the Monk with his friend Rasputin. Romantic, elegant and ironic, he is quick off the mark. Throughout history, he has had feelings for Pandora. Then, he will remain haunted over the years by this ancient love.
- Tarao: He is a New Zealand Maori who was spared by Rasputin during the attack on the cargo ship, to enter his service. Young experienced sailor, he knows how to take advantage of the beliefs and legends of the peoples of the South Pacific. In his village, he was educated by a certain Miss Star, who runs his school with his father, the chief. Then he worked on a Dutch cargo ship to learn a job, where he was captured. Thereafter, he will keep company with Cain, Pandora and Corto.
- Christian Slütter: Lieutenant of the Kaiserliche Marine, the Imperial German Navy, he reluctantly received orders from his superiors to take command of a submarine to place himself at the disposal of the Monk.
- The Monk: A pirate leader, he constantly wears a cowl and hides his face and his identity under a hood. From his island, Escondida, he heads a secret organization that rules the South Seas. He put himself at the service of Germany to procure coal for its boats crossing the region. No one knows its identity and some claim that it has existed for over two hundred years.
- Toko, aka "Taki Jap": Japanese military, captain of a gunboat.

=== The first Corto Maltese's appearance ===
Although the story introduces a new comic book character destined to become famous, Corto Maltese is not the main character. According to Pratt, Pandora Groovesnore is the central character. He explains that everyone is in love with her, and that she is a kind and beautiful girl who becomes an adult. Corto is just a secondary character, like so many others in this story. The cartoonist did not suspect that he would reuse the Corto Maltese character for a whole series.

To pretend that this story is true, Pratt published, in addition, a fake letter from Cain's nephew, Obregan Carrenza, which he had to give to the cartoonist himself. This process is also often used in adventure novels. This document, dating from the middle of the 20th century évokes Corto's old age and his sadness following the death of his friend Tarao. This letter is missing from many editions of this story, probably because some publishers refuse to let the reader imagine the aging hero.

=== Sequel and prequel ===
Hugo Pratt will reuse Corto Maltese for news adventures taking place in America, published for the first time in 1970 and collected in the volume Under the Sign of Capricorn. This is the start of his Corto Maltese series, comprising twelve episodes. One of which takes place eight years before the first episode, in 1905 in Manchuria (China), relating the meeting between Corto and Rasputin: Corto Maltese: The Early Years. After Pratt's death, the series was resumed by Ruben Pellejero and Juan Diaz Canales. They have currently made three additional episodes. In the last one, they imagined a prequel to The Ballad of the Salty Sea, All Saints Day, to explain why Corto was attached to the raft and how he worked for the Monk.

== Analysis ==
=== The island of Escondida ===
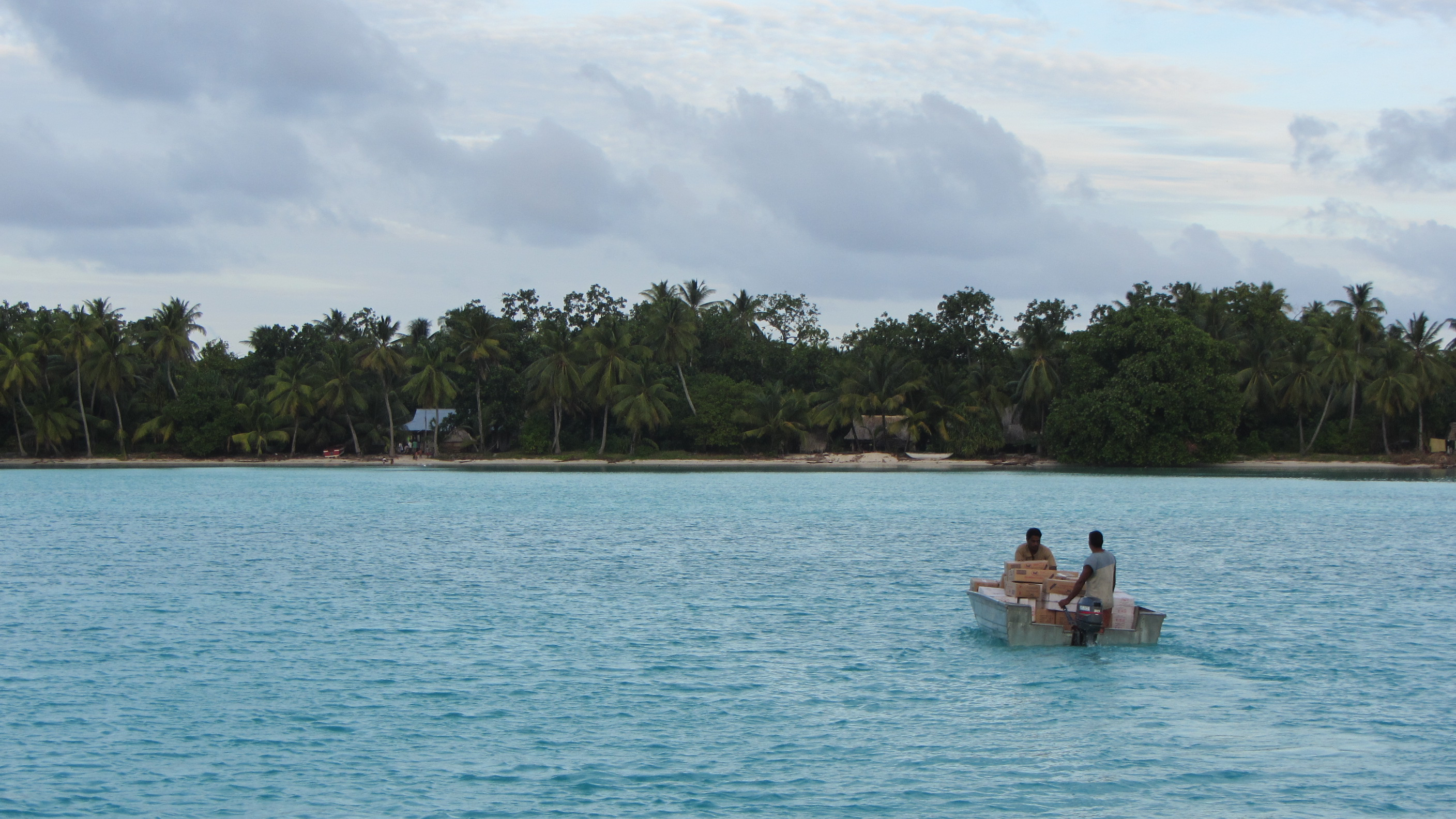
Abaiang

Escondida is a fictional island located in Western Oceania, the scene of an important part of this story. Its coordinates are 169 ° west longitude, 19 ° south latitude. Which corresponds to the location of the Tanna Island (in Vanuatu, near New Caledonia). However, Pratt claimed that his model was Abaiang (Gilbert Islands, Kiribati).

=== Literary references ===
The story abounds in literary references. For example, at the start, Rasputin is reading Voyage autour du monde, Louis Antoine de Bougainville's travel diary. This French explorer indeed sailed in the same zone where he was at that time. Cain, on several occasions, spreads his culture through various allusions. Thus, when he failed on a beach with Tarao, he compares themself to Robinson Crusoe and Friday (characters created by Daniel Defoe). Then, when they escape from the cannibals with the others, he tells him about Moby Dick (from the novel Moby-Dick by Herman Melville). Later, in Slütter's submarine, he is reading The Rime of the Ancient Mariner, the long poem by Samuel Taylor Coleridge. Finally, when he leaves Escondida with Pandora, he evokes the ship Argo and the character Jason, from Greek mythology.

=== Inspirations ===
Twenty years after the creation of this story, Pratt slipped a dedication into it. It pays homage to the Irish writer Henry De Vere Stacpoole, who piqued Pratt's interest in the South Seas.

=== Oceanian cultural elements ===
Hugo Pratt discreetly slides into his story various allusions to cultural elements of the different Oceanian peoples encountered, whether through their songs or their conversations. They allude for example to gods, creatures or illustrious people, like Kanaloa, Tāne, Tū, Rongo, Tangaroa, Māui, Kupe, Tamatea (explorer), Pehee Nuee Nuee. They also speak of mythical places like Hawaiki. Finally, they evoke several of the many Pacific islands: Mangareva, Hawaii, Tahiti, Heragi (Māori name for Pitcairn Island, in Pitcairn Islands), Aotearoa (Māori name for New Zealand), Tubuai. The decor of the comic is punctuated by various Oceanian masks. Several of them are thus visible on the house where Cain is a prisoner. These items resemble those made by Baining people, they live in Papua New Guinea.

Despite this realism, Pratt allows himself touches of fantasy, sometimes making his Oceanian characters speak in Venetian language (an element that translators leave as is).

== Awards and tributes ==
=== Awards ===
The album won the award for the best foreign realistic work at the 1976 Angoulême Festival.

=== Ranking ===
This story was classified in 2012 at the 3rd place of the classification of "50 essential BD" established by the French magazine Lire.

=== Preface ===
Umberto Eco, Italian novelist and literary critic, wrote a preface to this story (found in the 1989 edition) on the geographic and cultural references of this story. (Note: Corto Maltese or the imperfect geography, by Umberto Eco)

== Bibliography ==
- Petitfaux, Dominique (1990). De l'autre côté de Corto : Hugo Pratt – Entretiens avec Dominique Petitfaux. Casterman. ISBN 2-203-38016-0.
- Le monde extraordinaire de Corto Maltese. Casterman. 2002. ISBN 2-203-34427-X.
- Ory, Pascal (2012). "BD essentielles de Lire: La Ballade de la mer salée, de Hugo Pratt".
