= The Golden House of Samarkand =

Graphic novel with Corto Maltese

The Golden House of Samarkand (La casa dorata di Samarcanda)
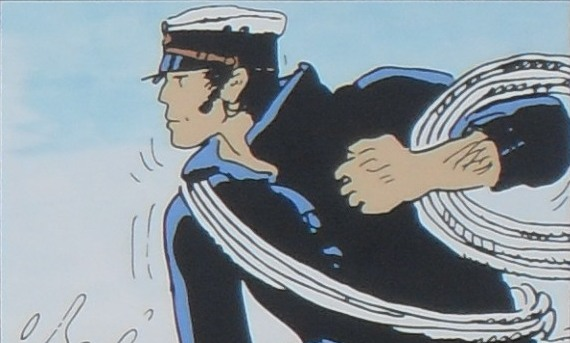
- Series: Corto Maltese
- Publisher: Casterman

Creative team
- Creator: Hugo Pratt

Original publication
- Published in: 1980
- ISBN: 978-1-68405-641-5

Chronology
- Preceded by: Fable of Venice
- Followed by: Tango

The Golden House of Samarkand is a graphic novel, episode of Corto Maltese's adventures, a Maltese sailor. He lives a long journey from the Mediterranean Sea to the heart of Asia, between December 1921 and September 1922. This story was written and drawn by the Italian comic book creator Hugo Pratt. This is the twenty-sixth story and eighth album in the series. It was published for the first time in 1980.

== Summary ==
=== Rhodes ===
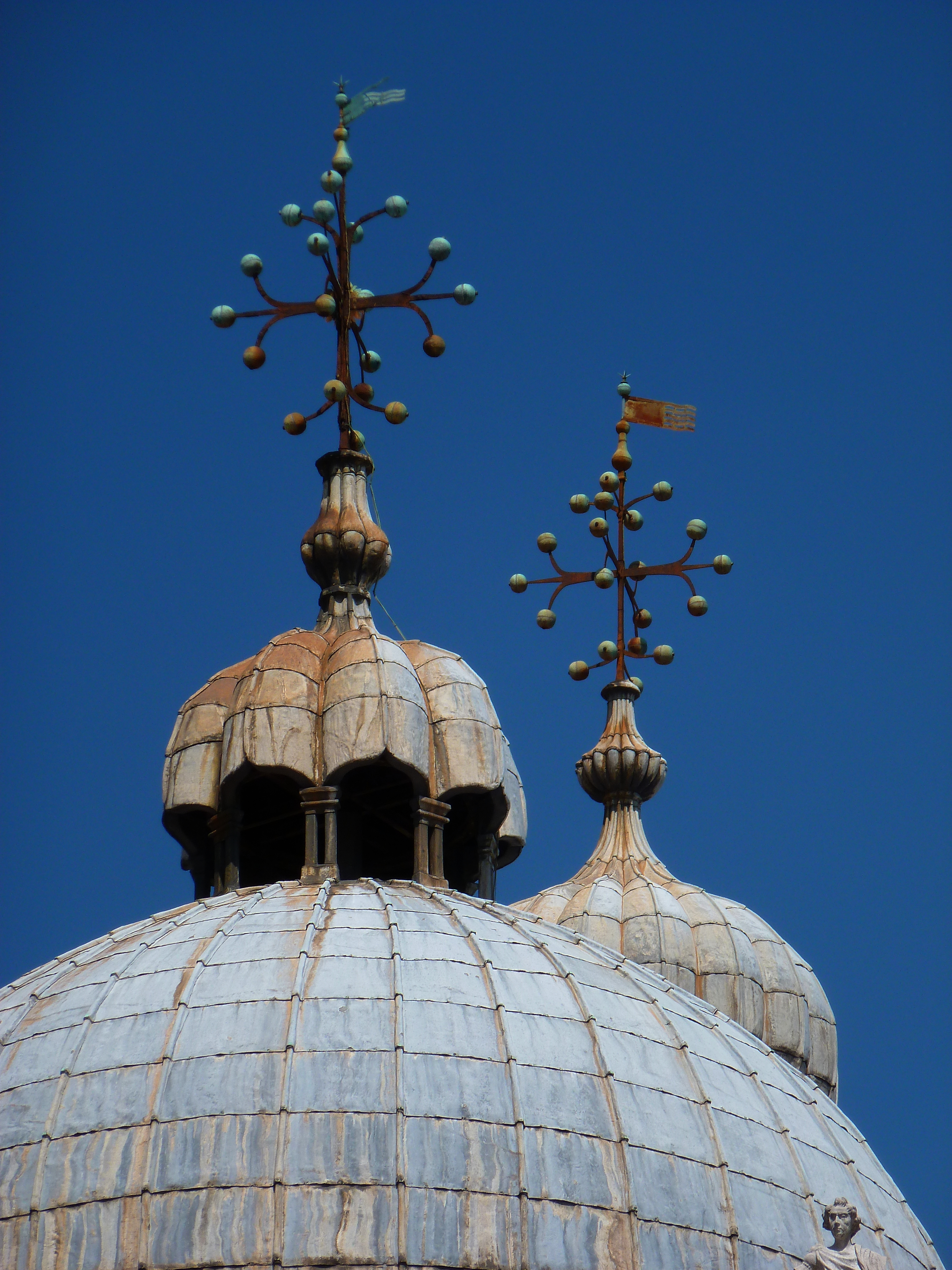
Roof of St. Mark's Basilica

Sitting at the foot of a column, Corto still has his head full of images from his previous treasure hunting in Venice, dreaming of St Mark's Basilica. But in this month of December 1921, a new hunt opened up to him. Indeed, he is now in Rhodes (island of Rhodes, Greece), near a column with a deer, to solve another riddle of his friend Baron Corvo. It speaks of the poet Lord Byron's memoir, hidden by Edward John Trelawny on the Kawakly mosque, under the moon. Thus, the sailor discreetly climbs the dome of the mosque and removes the crescent moon adorning the top. In a hidey-hole, among the scorpions, he finds the precious documents including a letter from Trelawny. He speaks of a legendary treasure hidden by Alexander the Great somewhere in the Afghan mountains, as shown on an attached map.

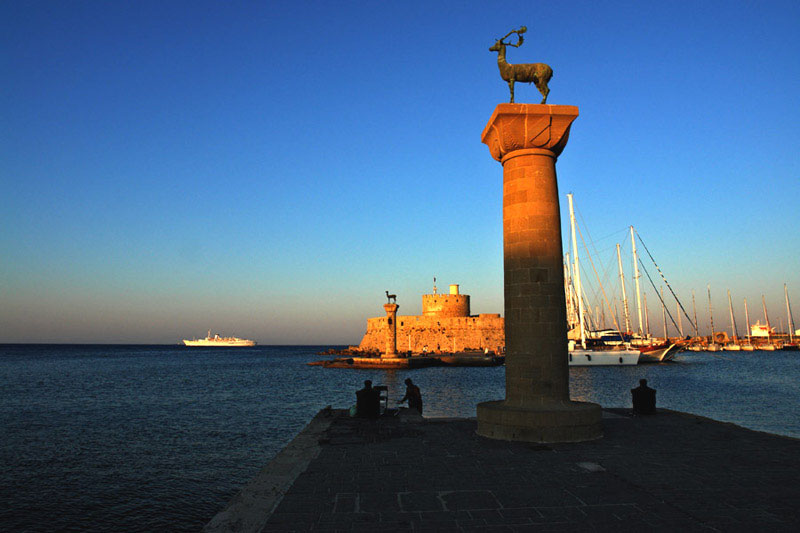
Columns surmounted by statues of a deer and a doe bronze, where the Colossus of Rhodes once stood.

But Corto is quickly overtaken by reality when Italian troops spot his night walk. As he tries to escape them, he is called by a mysterious man who leads him to a secret meeting. The sailor is confused by the participants with a man named Timur Chevket, a leader of a Turanist movement, who is as alike as two peas in a pod. To preserve his life, he decides to pull the wool over their eyes. Commander Bahiar recounts recent events: General Enver Pasha, ousted by Mustafa Kemal Atatürk (now president of Turkey), wants to regain his place. To reach this goal, he broke with the Bolsheviks and joined the anti-communist Muslims. His aim is to create a great state unifying the Turkish peoples, from Turkey to western China. Bahiar gives an appointment to Chevket/Corto in Adana (in Cilicia, Turkey) and, together, they will go to Turkestan. The sailor is forced to agree and, after the meeting, shows a clean pair of heels. But he is notwithstanding caught by the Italian troops, who lead him to the Carabinieri captain, Antonio Sorrentino. Corto has already met him in Venice in the story The Angel in the Window to the Orient (in the volume Celtic Tales).

Finally, he goes to the house of his Greek friend Cassandra, who lodges him. She uses her skills in tasseography to guess his future in Greek coffee grounds: he will experience dangerous and sad events. In his room, while carefully studying the documents, he receives his Turkish friend Ibahiyah. This one gives him information about Chevket and a Saladin's insignia to be accepted by the Dervishes of Adana.

=== Turkey ===
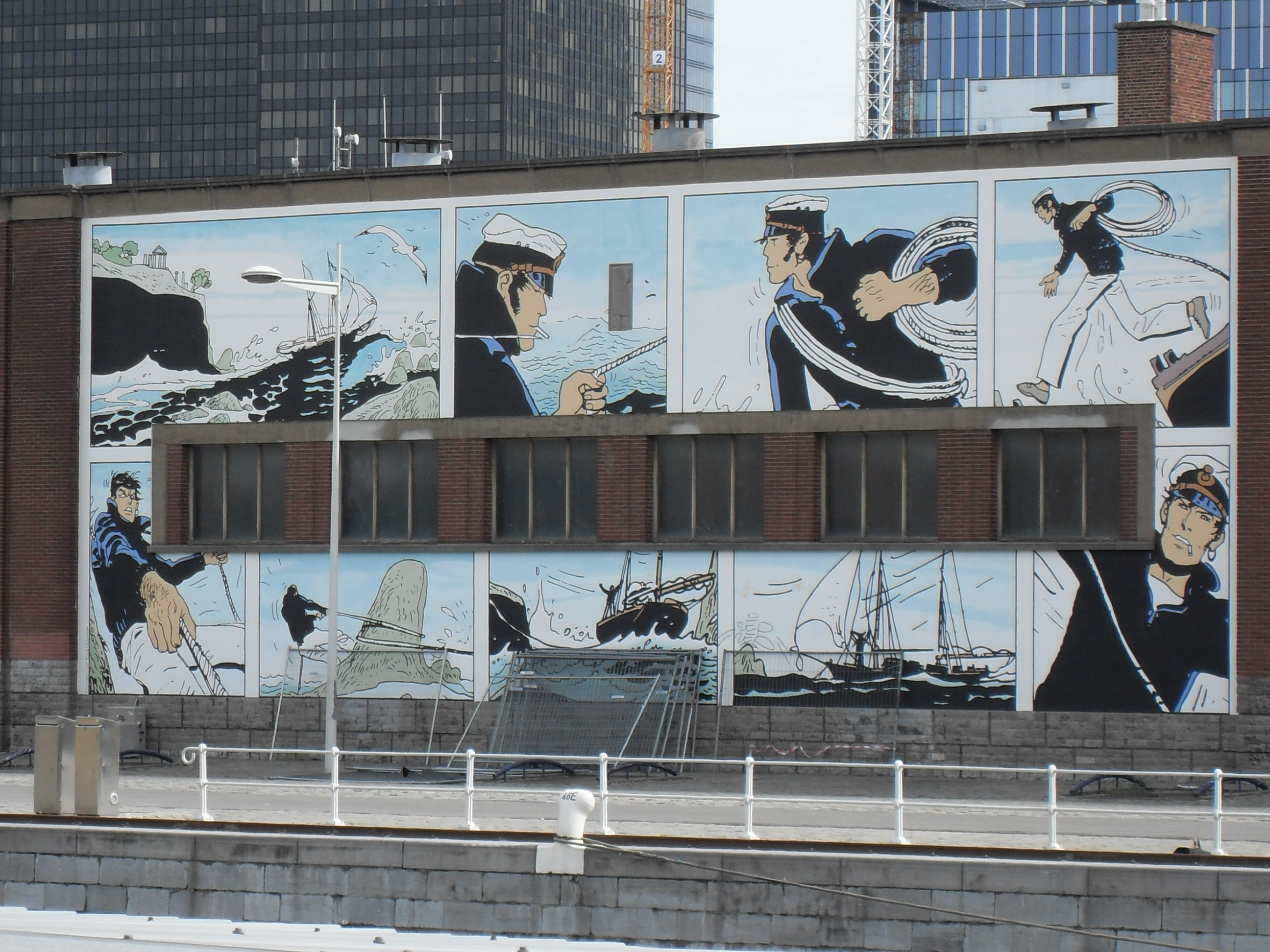
Part of a mural in Brussels dedicated to Corto Maltese. This section reproduces a panel sequence from The Golden House of Samarkand (originally printed in black and white) in which Corto manages to moor his boat off the Turkish coast, near Tarsus.

Two days later, Cassandra's brother Narcissus takes Corto across the Levantine Sea (the easternmost part of the Mediterranean) aboard his sailboat. After being blown off course by a meltem, they manage to berth on the Turkish coast, near Tarsus. On shore, they come upon a couple of European actors at the mercy of some Kurdish deserters. Once they get free of them, Corto interacts with the artists. The man, who is British and disguised as John Bull, will die quickly of a syncope brought on by the distressing events. The woman, dressed as Marianne, immediately falls for Corto. But suddenly, the Kurds come back and threaten them. In the end, Corto gets away with promising their leader Reshid a part of the treasure he is looking for and arranges to meet him in the city of Van.

At this era, the country has suffered the consequences of the World War I: the Ottoman Empire, which is almost dead, was dismembered by the 1920 Treaty of Sèvres. The region where Corto is located, although part of Turkish territory, is under the domination of French troops. This explains why he met French soldiers there. Also, Mustafa Kemal Atatürk notably relied on helping the Kurds in his political ambitions. In return, he promised them an independent state. But, after the creation of Turkey, he denied them. The State of Kurdistan does not appear in the Treaty of Lausanne of 1923, negotiated by it with European powers to replace that of Sèvres.

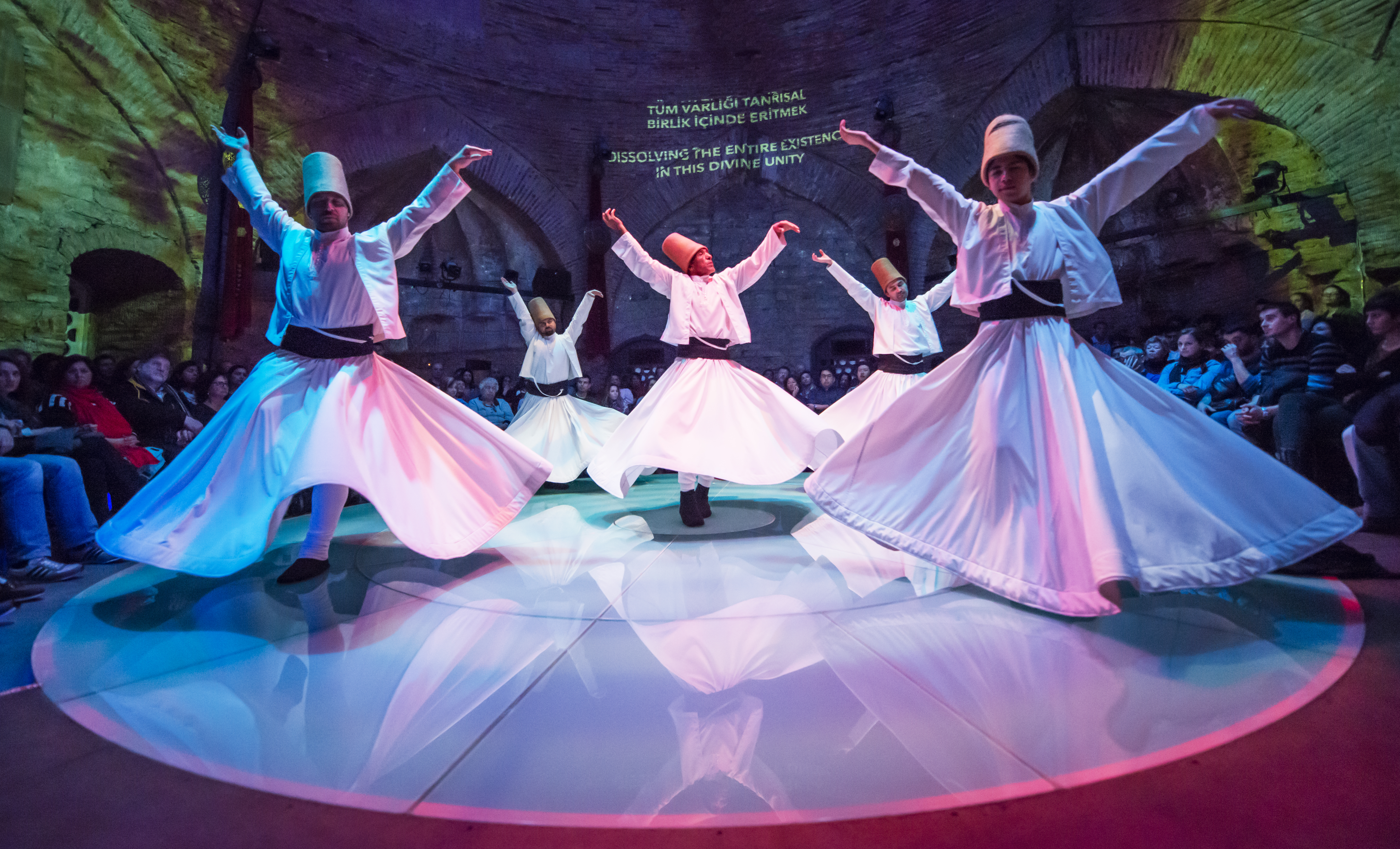
Hodjapasha Culture Center is a beautifully restored Ottoman hamam (Turkish bathhouse) in Istanbul's Sirkeci district now used for performances of the Mevlevi (whirling dervish) sema.

Corto, therefore, arrives in Adana in January 1922. There he is introduced to the Mevlevi Order school, whose members are performing a dance: they are the famous 'whirling dervishes'. Later, Maltese discusses with their Imam, who hosts him. He explains that he wants to free his friend, the Russian sailor Rasputin, from the "Golden House of Samarkand". It's a horrible prison, which is located somewhere in Central Asia. It is watched by fierce guards who relentlessly torture and kill their prisoners. The vultures and braziers then remove the remains of the victims. This place is so called because it is only possible to escape through the golden dreams caused by the swirls of hashish. But during this time, Armenian nationalists spy on them: confusing Corto with Chevket, they attack the place to avenge the Armenian genocide, caused by the Turks. The Imam is dead, but the sailor survives.

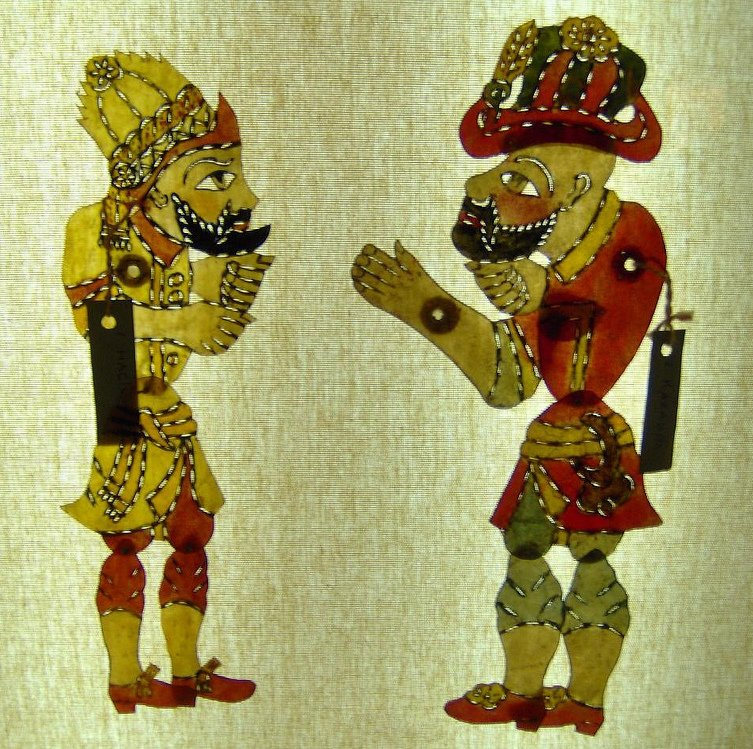
Hacivat (left) and Karagöz (right)

While walking through the streets of this city, he meets a girl who recites a quatrain by Omar Khayyam (Persian poet of the 11th - 12th century). So, he gives her a pomegranate. Seeing this act of generosity, a mysterious veiled woman laughs at him and tries to scare him by hurting him. He recognizes in her an old acquaintance. Later, he sees Marianne again, who leads him to a shadow play, where a show "Karagöz and Hacivat" is represented. During the play, Corto sees a puppet resembling Rasputin, which calls him. So he goes backstage and meets the woman, who is also looking for the treasure. All at once, he's knocked out and stripped. A dream follows where he finds himself in Paradise and where Rasputin drives him to Pandora, an old love (in the center of the story The Ballad of the Salty Sea).

He wakes up in a truck roading to Van, surrounded by Kurdish soldiers, in a convoy, led by Bahiar. He arrives in this town bordering the Lake Van in March. There he meets an old imam, Zorah, who agrees to help him cross Azerbaijan. But he wants to give him an eleven-year-old Armenian who survived the massacre of her parents. He asked him to take her to his family in Russian Armenia, before recommending that he trust Kısmet (destiny). Then, he shows him his co-religionists who are followers of Yazidism. The youngest of the priests invokes the circle and the young peacock (Melek Taus, head of the seven angels in-charge for watching over the world). Then, he calls Shaitan, whom Corto has already met in Africa under the name of Samael (in the story More Romeos, More Juliets, published in the volume The Ethiopian). This character predicts the future of Corto, speaking of a tree with strange fruits.

Next, Corto must meet Reshid near the Semiramis wall. But Zorah shows him that he was hanged in a tree with his accomplices: these are the strange fruits mentioned by Shaitan. Later, a car awaits Maltese, with Marianne and the mysterious woman inside. The latter is none other than Venexiana Stevenson, an old Corto's enemy. She tells him that Bahiar and the other Turkish nationalists now know his true identity (thanks to the papers found on him) and, moreover, she revealed to them his quest for the treasure. As for the little Armenian, she is taken hostage by the commander, in exchange for the treasure. The latter executes Zorah. Corto, who does not know it, leaves with the two women.

=== Persia ===
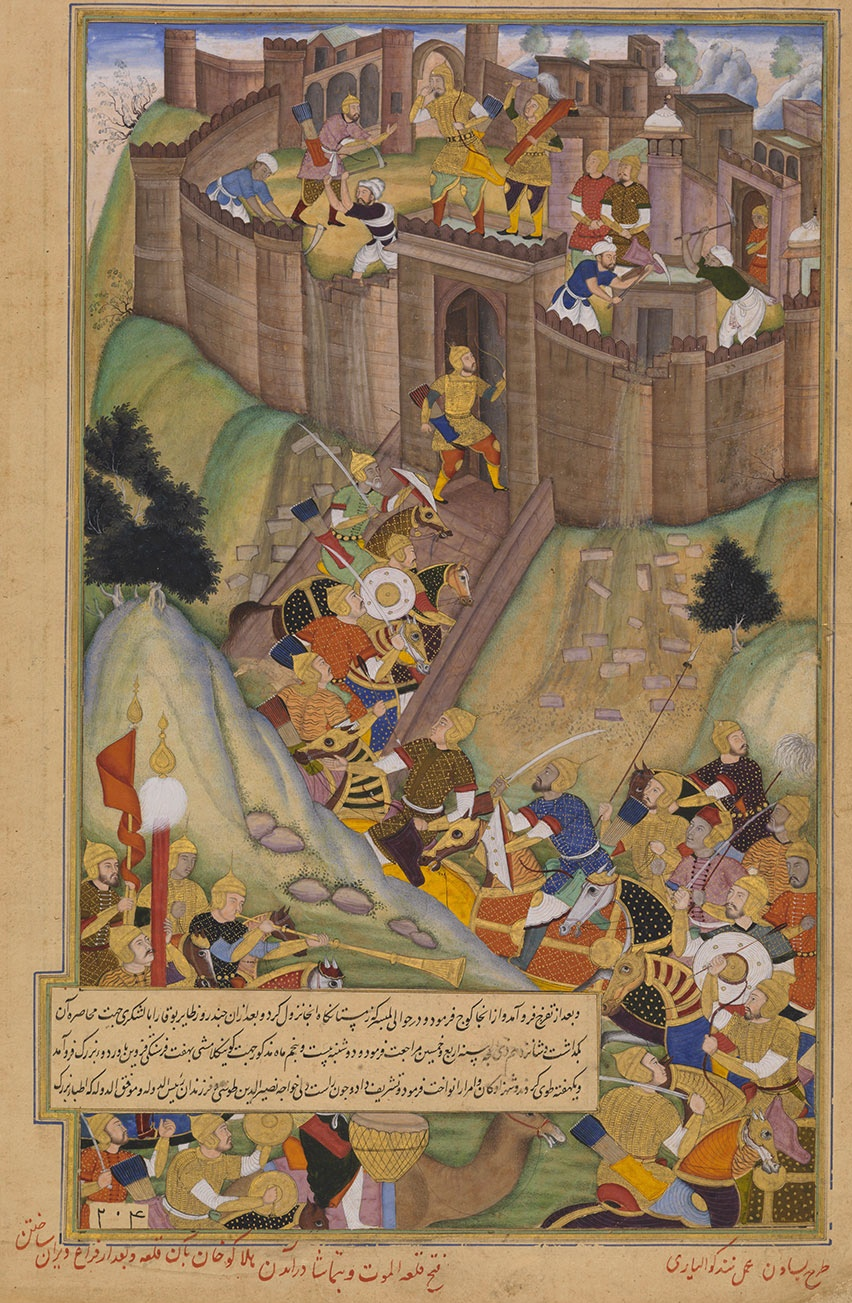
Capture of the Alamut, 15th-century Persian miniature

He recommends that the driver cross the border with Persia, which would be the safest for them. This man, an adept of Isma'ilism (a branch of Shia Islam), leads them to the area of the Alamut Castle. The sailor takes the opportunity to tell the legend linked to this place, that of the Hashshashin. These Saracens once formed a sect of the Nizari Isma'ilism current, having their lair in this castle. Under the influence of hashish, they massacred those whom their leader (the "Old Man of the Mountain") asked them to kill. Their name, translated into Assassins, is the origin of the term "assassin". Maltese continues his account, claiming that the existence of this terrible sect is confirmed by the testimonies of various people. They are for example Gerhardus, "vice dominus" of Strasbourg sent by Frédéric Barbarossa in 1170, as well as Arnold of Lübeck. But this legend is best-known thanks to Marco Polo, who mentions it in 1273 in his Book of the Marvels of the World. The castle has since been destroyed by the Mongols.

But Corto discovers that this order has not disappeared: the pilot is indeed a member. Thus, the latter leads them to the other Hashshashins, to go to the cult's new lair, "New Alamut". Approaching it, members believe it is occupied, possibly by a Persian Cossack Brigade ruled by Reza Shah, and get scared. Corto goes on reconnaissance with a member named Abbas: there is no one there. Despite this, the Hashshashins have already fled. Thus, the three travelers remain on site to sleep. Corto explains his plans for the rest of his trip. He wants to cross the Caspian Sea in order to free his friend. Next, he plans to search for the treasure in the legendary Kafiristan (present-day Nuristan Province in Afghanistan). Hearing this, Venexiana recalls "The Man Who Would Be King", Rudyard Kipling's famous 1888 novella which takes place in this region.

During this time in Turkestan, in the lair of Enver Pasha, Rasputin is introduced to Chevket. The Russian confuses him with Corto, but the leader brutally disabuses him. Thus, Chevket is intrigued by this mysterious man who looks so much like him and whom he hears a lot about. Rasputin explains Corto's character to him, his sense of friendship: he is so noble that he borders on stupidity. This explains why he is able to brave a thousand dangers to save his friend. Afterwards, Chevket offers Rasputin to accept a military post in exchange for his freedom, having all the required qualities. This is why he changes sides to preserve his life, becoming an army instructor at the rank of Qaid.

In "New Alamut", suddenly, the Red Army attacks the fortress. Soldiers escort them until a Soviet customs office. As they are threatened with being shot, Corto asks to call an old friend by phone to ask him to save them. He is none other than Joseph Djougachvili, recently appointedGeneral Secretary of the Communist Party of the Soviet Union, since April 1922. A few years later he will become the dictator of the Soviet Union, under the name of Joseph Stalin. Finally, all three are released by the commissioner and can continue their adventures. The latter suggests that they embark in Baku (in current Azerbaijan) for Krasnovodsk (current Türkmenbaşy, Turkmenistan), across the Caspian Sea.

=== Central Asia ===
Meanwhile, the Qaid Rasputin is introduced to his men by Chevket. He also gave him the Armenian hostage. But the girl is impertinent towards this new soldier. Angry, Rasputin wants to punish her and corners her near a chasm. Having no choice, she throws a stone at him, which makes him fall into the ravine. Ten days later, his head wrapped in a bandage, Rasputin comes out of his coma. Marianne is at his bedside. Corto is also there: he teaches him new events. The traitor Chevket has left with the young prisoner, whom he wants to use for bartering for the treasure. He will wait for Corto near the Kofarnihon river.

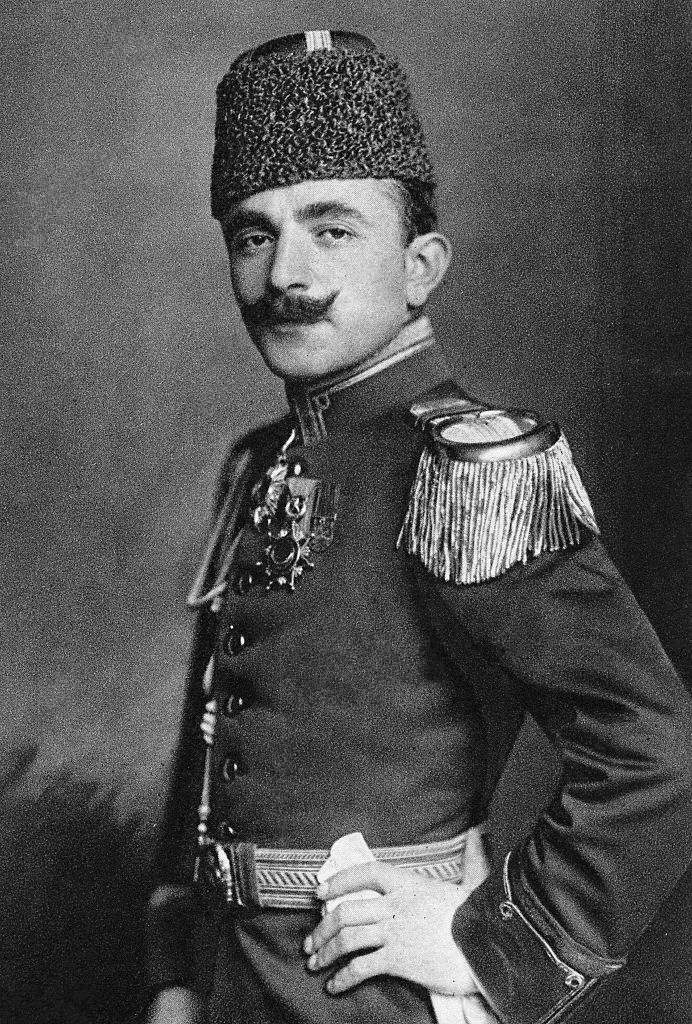
Enver Pasha (1881-1922)

Without warning, Armenian soldiers attack the fortress, as snow is falling on the Darvoz Range. Trapped, Enver Pasha then attempts a desperate exit to attack them. Delighted to kill their persecutor, they strafe him. This August 4, 1922, he finally succumbs to their bullets. Meanwhile, Rasputin and Corto are attached to cannons by the Pasha's soldiers in order to be killed. But they are saved by Venexiana. Later, when all the soldiers are gone, friends Corto and Rasputin dance together to celebrate their saved lives. Then, she confesses that she is pregnant and that she cannot continue the journey. So, she returns to Europe, accompanied by Marianne, happy to be useful to someone.

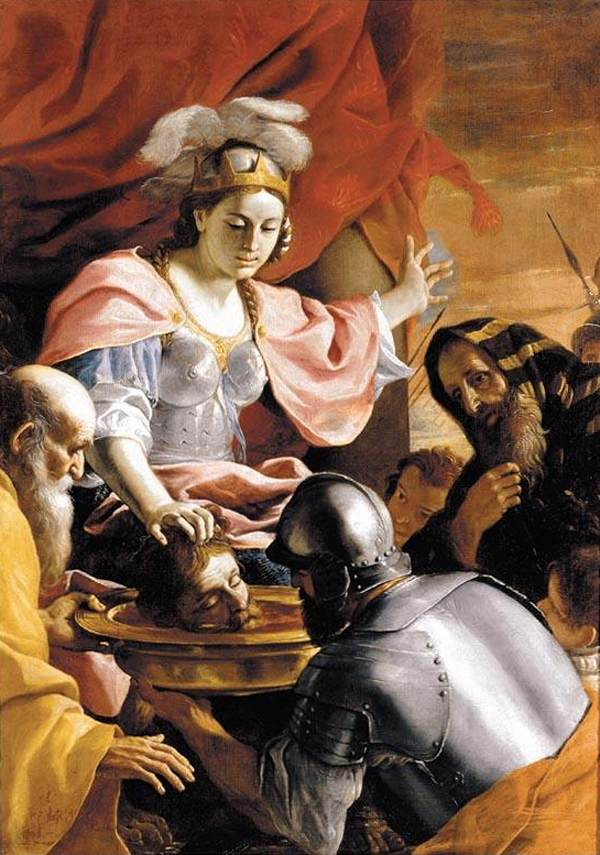
"Queen Tomyris Receiving the Head of Cyrus, King of Persia", Mattia Preti

=== Hindu Kush ===
Therefore, the two sailors go to the appointment. They trudge through snowstorms with their mules. Arrived on September 5, 1922, they discreetly spy on Chevket and his men. Corto is afraid of meeting his double, something he considers a sign of misfortune. So Rasputin himself removes the problem with his weapon and frees the girl. Then they poach Chevket's men to help them find the treasure hiding place. Corto explains that it is somewhere in an area where various geopolitical interests collide. This is the Great Game that Rudyard Kipling talks about in his novel Kim. In addition, he tells them the legend about this treasure. Cyrus II the Great, founder of the Persian Empire, presented an enormous treasure to Tomyris, queen of the Amazons, whom he wanted to marry. But she preferred to cut off his head, to then keep his treasure. Centuries later, Alexander the Great, king of Macedon, defeated the great king of Persia Darius III. He then had the treasure delivered to him, which he melted and molded in the form of a large golden ball symbolizing the sun. He then asked to hide it in the hollow of a mountain, in Hindu Kush. According to the precious documents, the treasure is found more precisely between Kafiristan and Badakhshan, in Afghanistan.

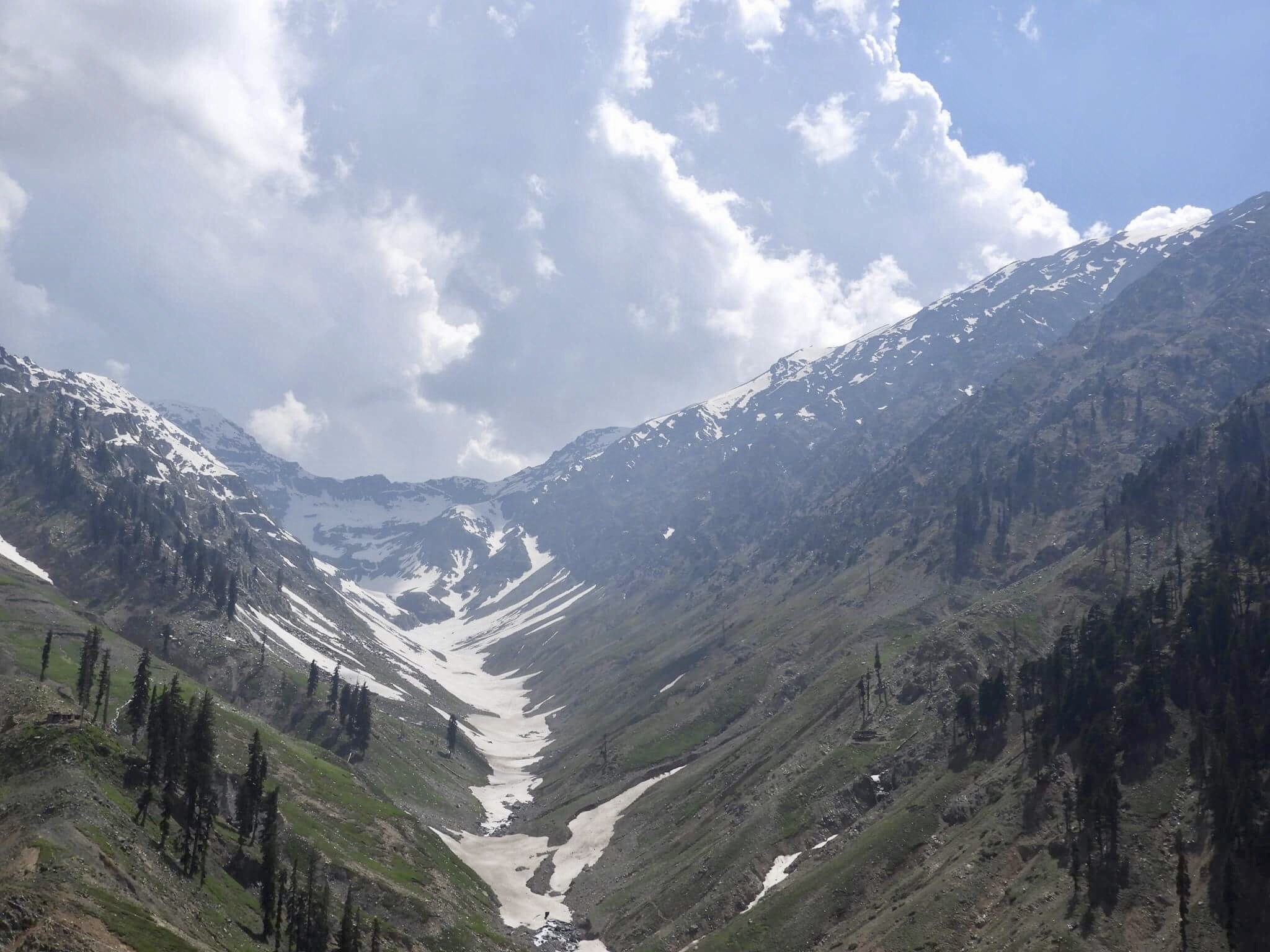
Kafiristan (2017)

After researching, they find the entrance to a cave, guarded by a statue of Ahriman, a demonic spirit of Zoroastrianism. From then on, animated by his greed, Rasputin prevents Chevket's men from following them. So, he only continues with Corto and the girl inside the cave. All of a sudden, an earthquake collapses stones that block the entrance. Further on, lighting a match, they discover a fabulous and enormous golden ball. But the wind extinguishes the match. And when they light another one, the treasure is gone. Mad with rage, Rasputin accuses the Armenian of having seized the treasure. But she says she hasn't seen him. What happened? A trick played by teasers demons? A collective hallucination? Or did the treasure just disappear during the earthquake?

Out of spite, they exit by another path and bump into the lost men of the Royal Gurkha Rifles. These inform them that they are in the British Raj: this cave communicates on both sides of the border. Soldiers offer to follow them to Chitral (in present-day Pakistan). From there, Corto leaves for Bombay (in present-day India), then drives the young girl to Venice, so that she can live with the Armenian community that resides there. They reach their destination in November 1922. In a future adventure in Argentina (in the episode Tango), Corto will explain to a friend that Rasputin is during this time the host of a Maharaja.

== Characters ==
This episode brings up many characters, some of whom will reappear or be mentioned in later episodes:

=== Fictional characters ===
- Rasputin: Russian sailor, was imprisoned in the prison nicknamed The Golden House of Samarkand because of his participation in a revolution. Nicknamed Ras, is mad, greedy, lustful and violent. He does not hesitate to murder people who get in his way. He often promises Corto to kill him one day. But deep down, he feels affection and shows loyalty to him, whom he considers his only friend. He is sort of Corto's best friend / foe.
- Corto Maltese: Born in Malta, this sailor often travels the world. He is romantic, elegant and ironic. He likes to go on an adventure, for a woman, a treasure or for friendship. In this episode, he embarks on a long journey through Asia to find Alexander the Great's treasure and save his friend Rasputin.
- Timur Chevket: Corto Maltese's look-alike, he is the leader of a Turanist movement, feared from Greece to Arabistan (in Persia).
- Marianne: Eveline de Sabrevoie is an actrice with various aliases, such as "Marianne", referring to the national personification of the French Republic.
- Venexiana Stevenson: An adventurer, who gives Corto a hard time. In this adventure, she competes with him for a time in the treasure hunt, before continuing with him. The reader later learns that she is pregnant: the identity of the father is not mentioned, but Pratt emphasizes that it is not Corto.
- Sevan Vartkès: An eleven-year-old Armenian girl in this story, whose parents were recently killed by a Turkish gang. She was then a hostage then, until Corto freed her; together, they continue the treasure hunt. After the trip, they take to the sea to Venice, where it is hosted by the Armenian Venetian community.
- Cassandra: Corto's friend, living in Rhodes and reading the future in coffee grounds. She bears the name of Cassandra, a character from Greek mythology, who received from Apollo the gift of telling the future. Her physique is characterized by Minoan kiss curls in her hair.
- Narcissus: Cassandra's brother, is a sailor who drives Corto to Turkey. Although being a Christian, he offers a fish to the god of the sea, to bring him luck. According to him, his sister was never wrong, but she predicts only misfortunes (like her namesake). As for him, he bears the name of Narcissus, a character from Greek mythology.

=== Historical characters ===
- Enver Pasha: He was one of the main political figureheads of the late-Ottoman Empire who got entangled with the Turanism movement in Central Asia after the defeat of Central Powers in World War 1.
- Joseph Djougachvili or Joseph Stalin: Future dictator of the Soviet Union. In this story, he saves his old friend Corto from execution. Both became friends when Stalin was a doorman in Ancona (Italy), in 1907.

== Analysis ==
=== Historical searches ===
In Buenos Aires (Argentina), Pratt met Armenians who told him about Enver Pasha. They told him about one of the hypotheses about his death, which he reused in his comic. Speaking of this subject, Pratt wanted to use this "fascinating character" in a story, after his friend the French essayist Jean Mabire explained to him that he was going to write a book about him. Thus, the comic book creator has gathered the necessary documentation. Interestingly, Pratt has used Mabire's book "Ungern, le Baron fou" (1973) on Roman von Ungern-Sternberg in a previous story, Corto Maltese in Siberia.

=== Rasputin, main character of this story ===
In this story, Rasputin steals the limelight from Corto. In fact, that is him the main character, and Maltese mostly makes this trip to save him, more than to find the treasure. Many scenes take place even without Corto. It is therefore fully the opportunity to develop the personality of the Russian and his links with his friend. Corto defines his character by explaining to Abbas that no one knows better than him to destroy anything that could take a sentimental turn. Likewise, Corto will explain to the girl that Rasputin is a villain, but he doesn't know it.

Pratt explains that the difference between Corto and Rasputin is that one is immoral and the other is amoral. He also says that they are complementary. Ras harshly brings Corto back to reality, when he lets himself be carried away by his romanticism. Moreover, the Russian has no qualms about killing a dangerous man, while Maltese only rarely resolves to it. Speaking to Chevket, then Enver Pasha, Rasputin defines himself as a thief, whose nationality is money. He fights for the military as long as they pay them. He thus plays his own role.

=== Tributes ===
The program Le dessous des cartes produced an episode on Corto's journey, presented on the Franco-German channel Arte

== Gallery ==
Images of places or people tied to this story

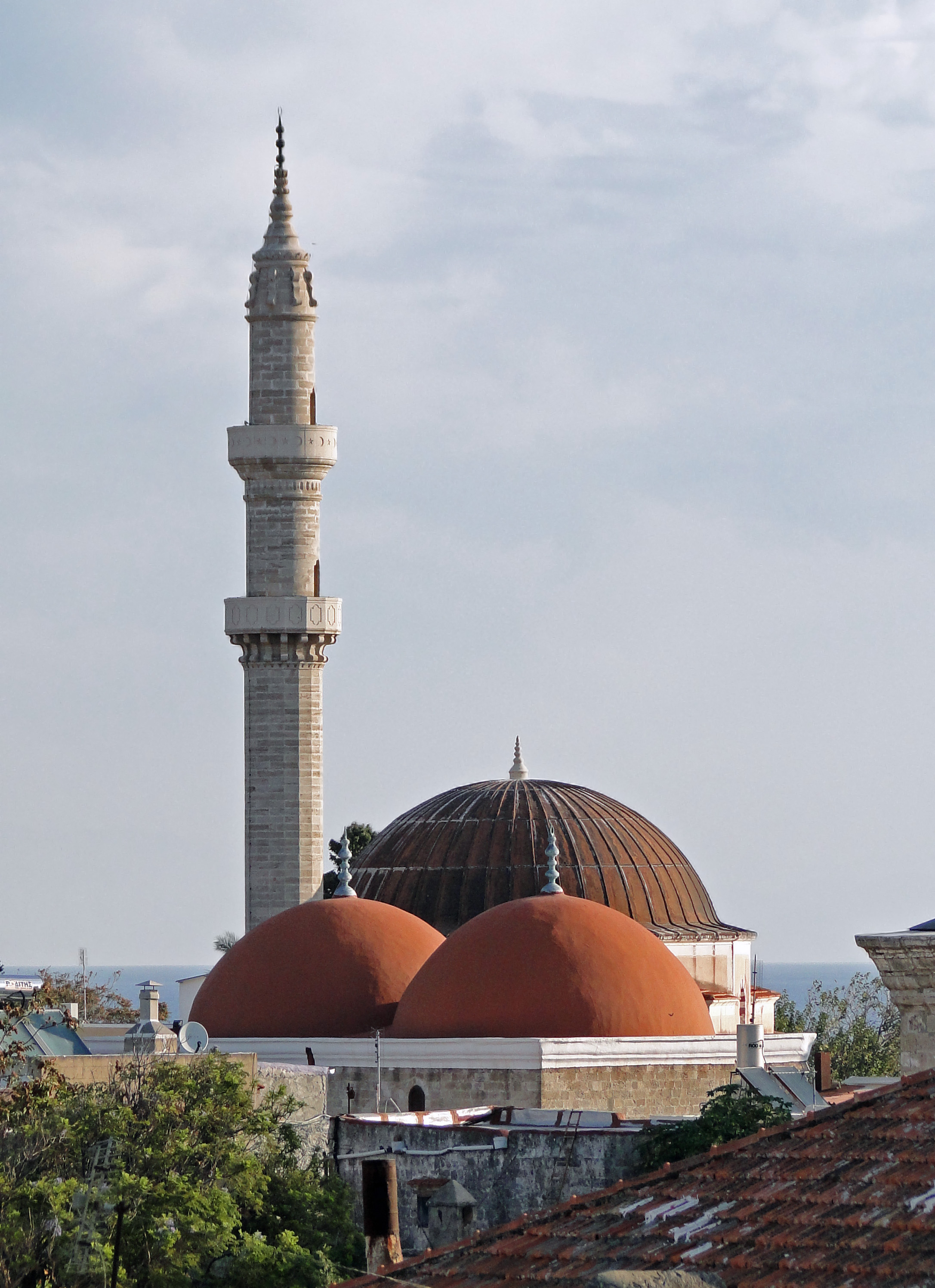
Suleiman Mosque, Rhodes

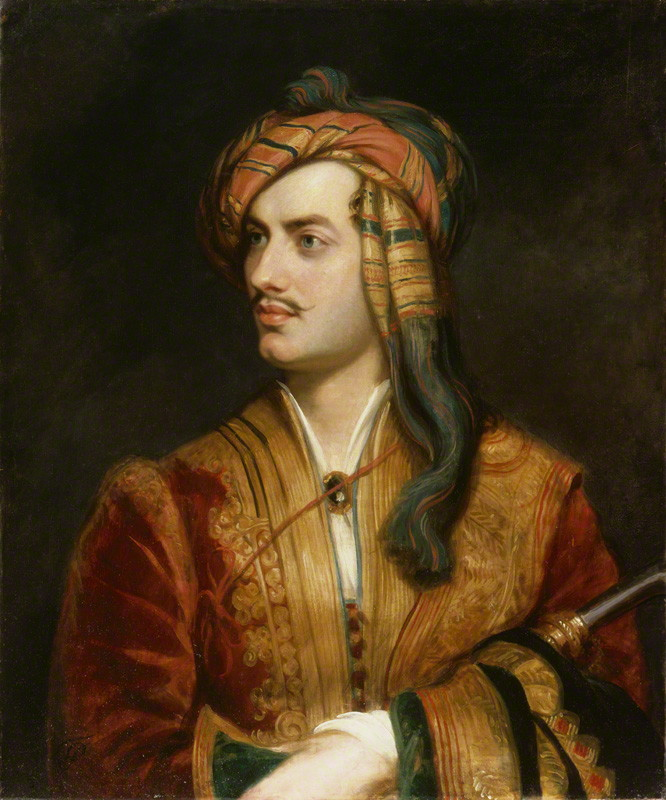
Lord Byron in Albanian Dress by Thomas Phillips, 1813

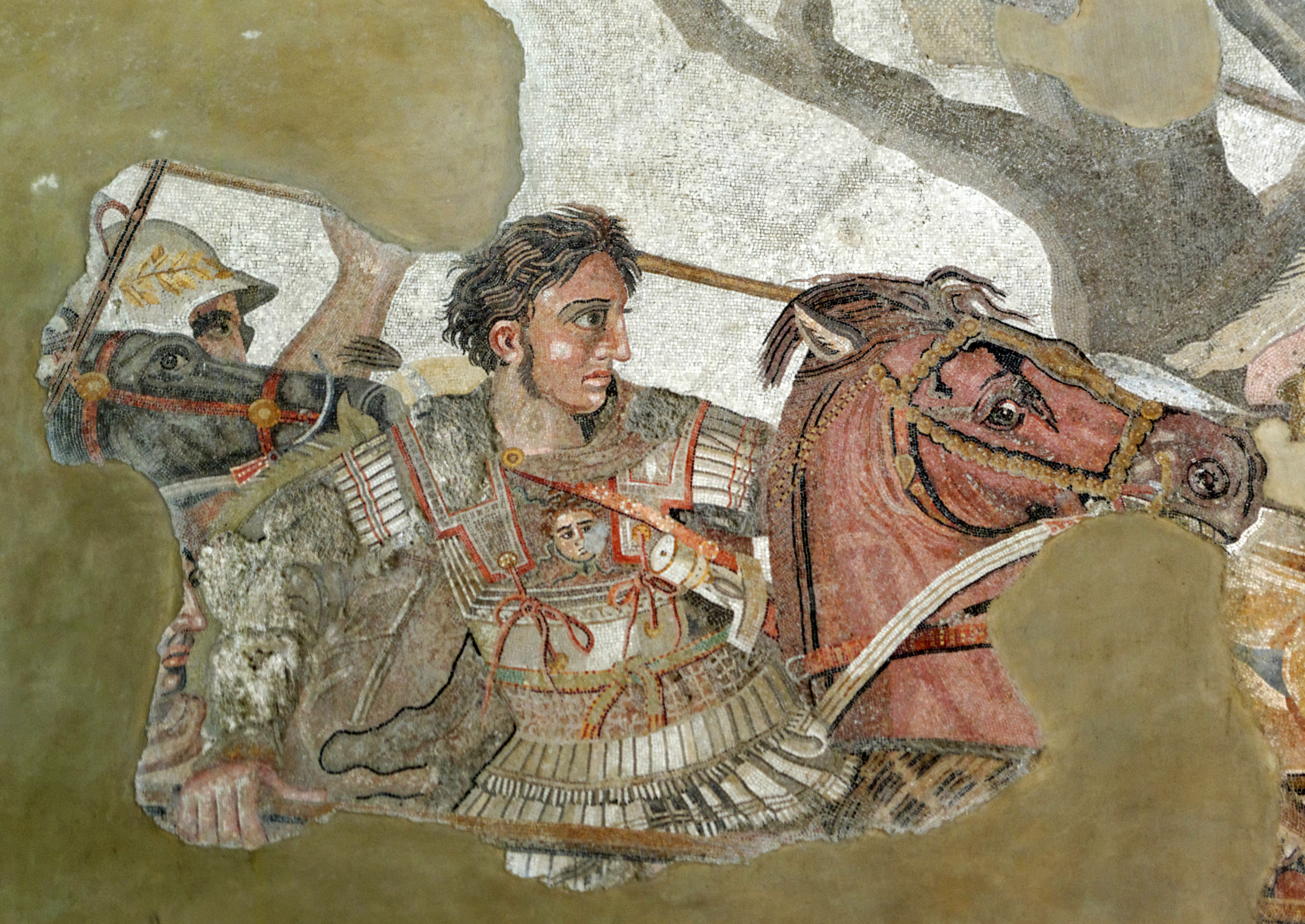
Alexander the Great

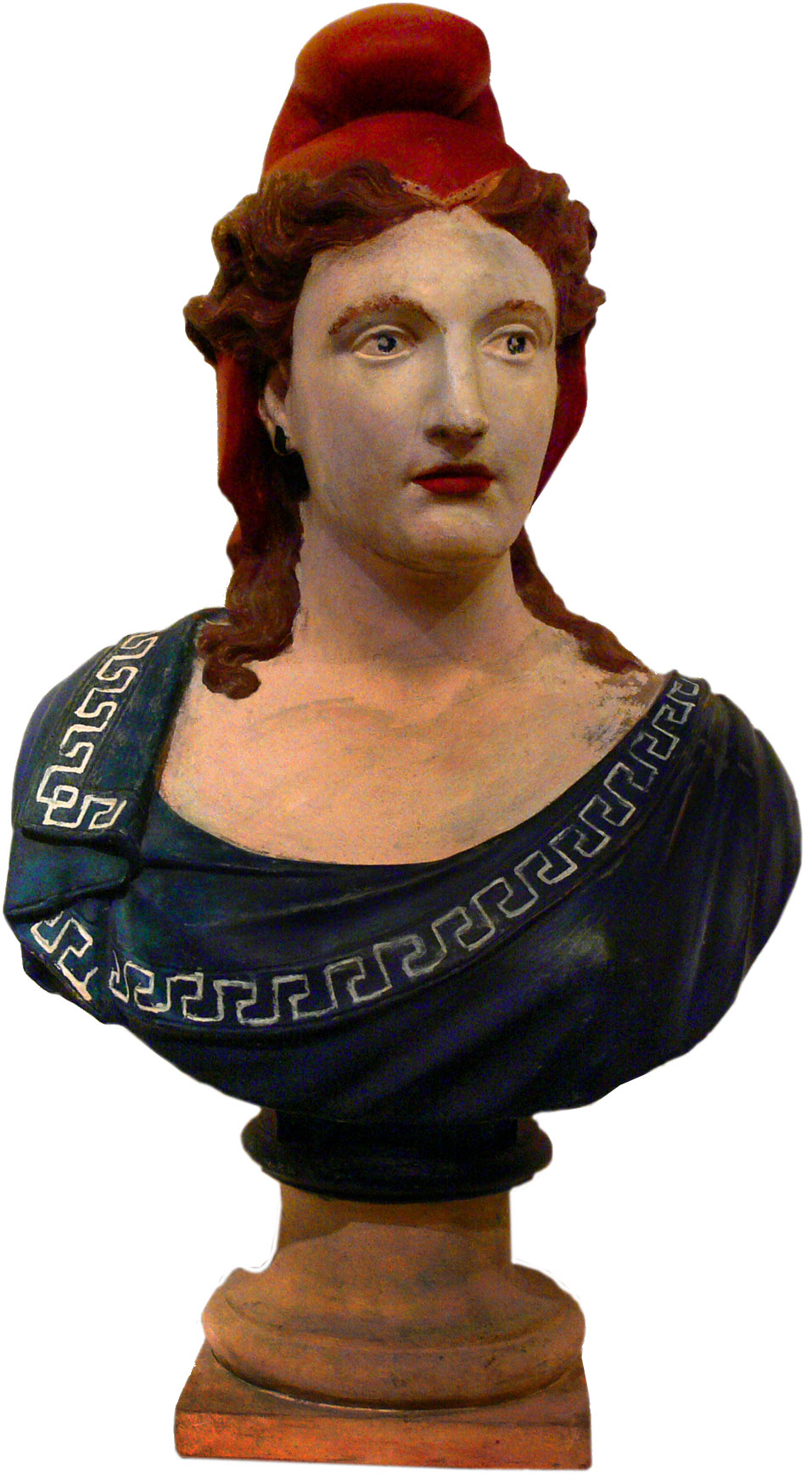
Marianne - symbol of French Republic

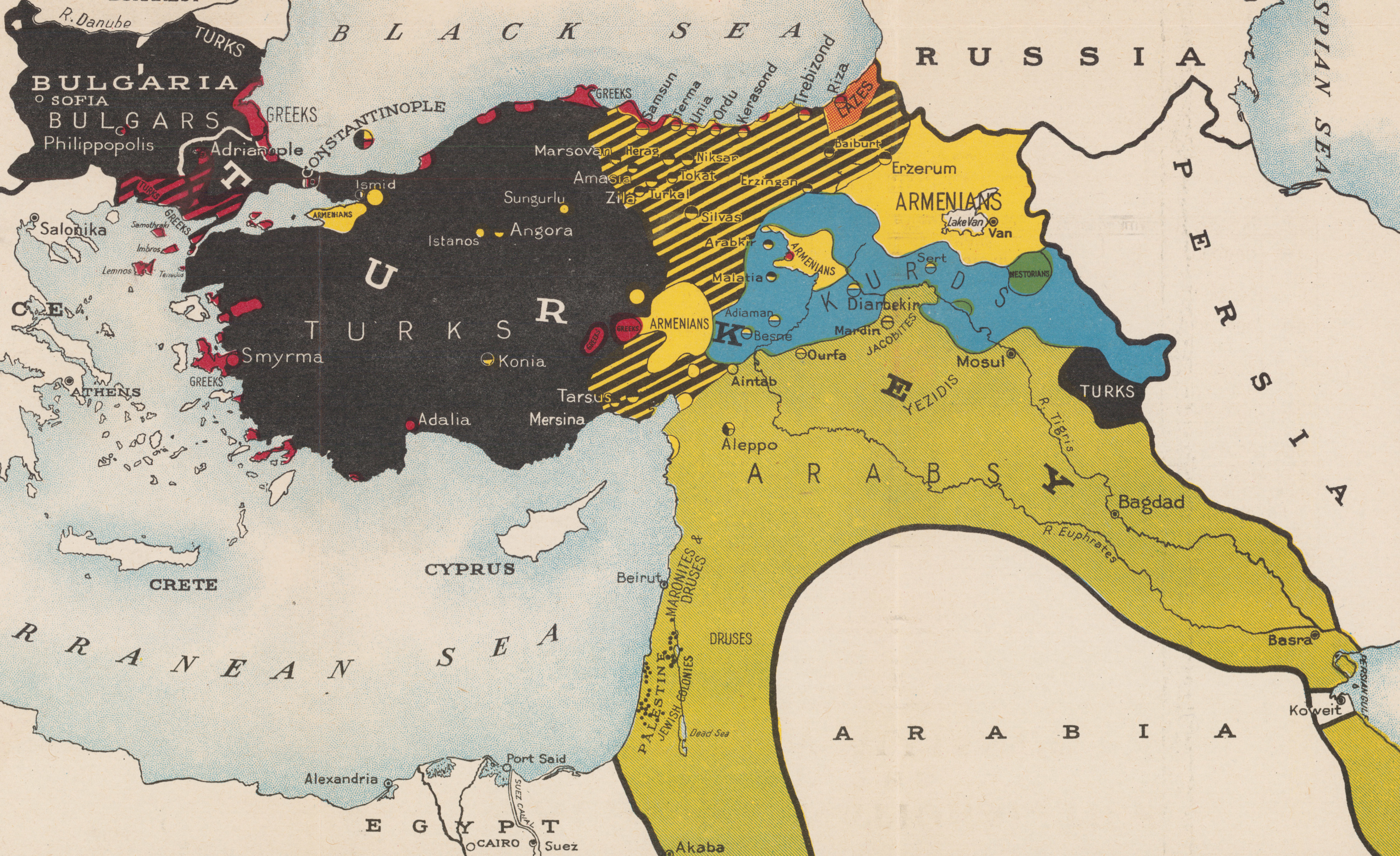
Ethnic map of Asia Minor in 1917. Black = Bulgars and Turks. Red = Greeks. Light yellow = Armenians. Blue = Kurds. Orange = Lazes. Dark Yellow = Arabs. Green = Nestorians.

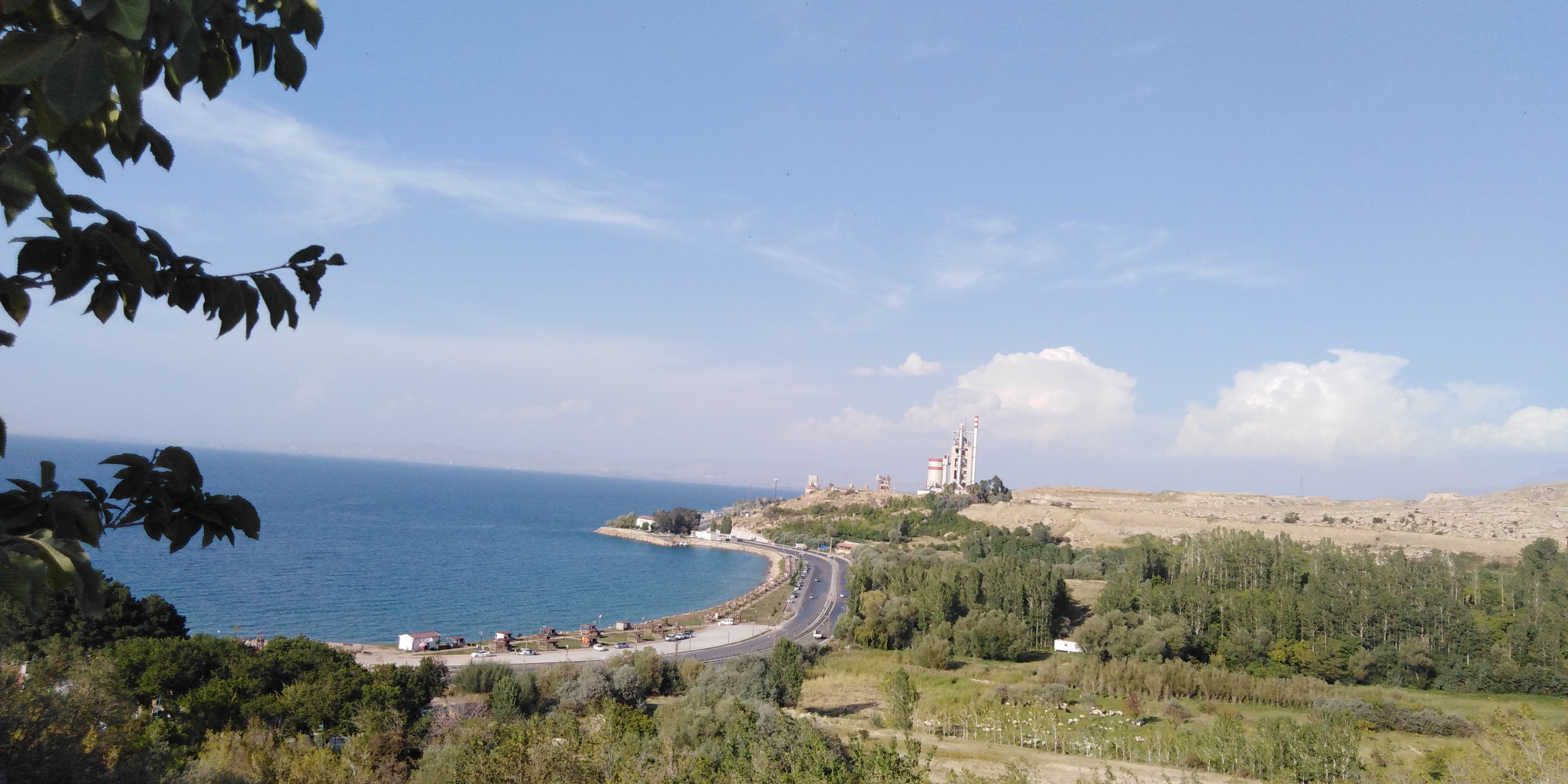
City of Van

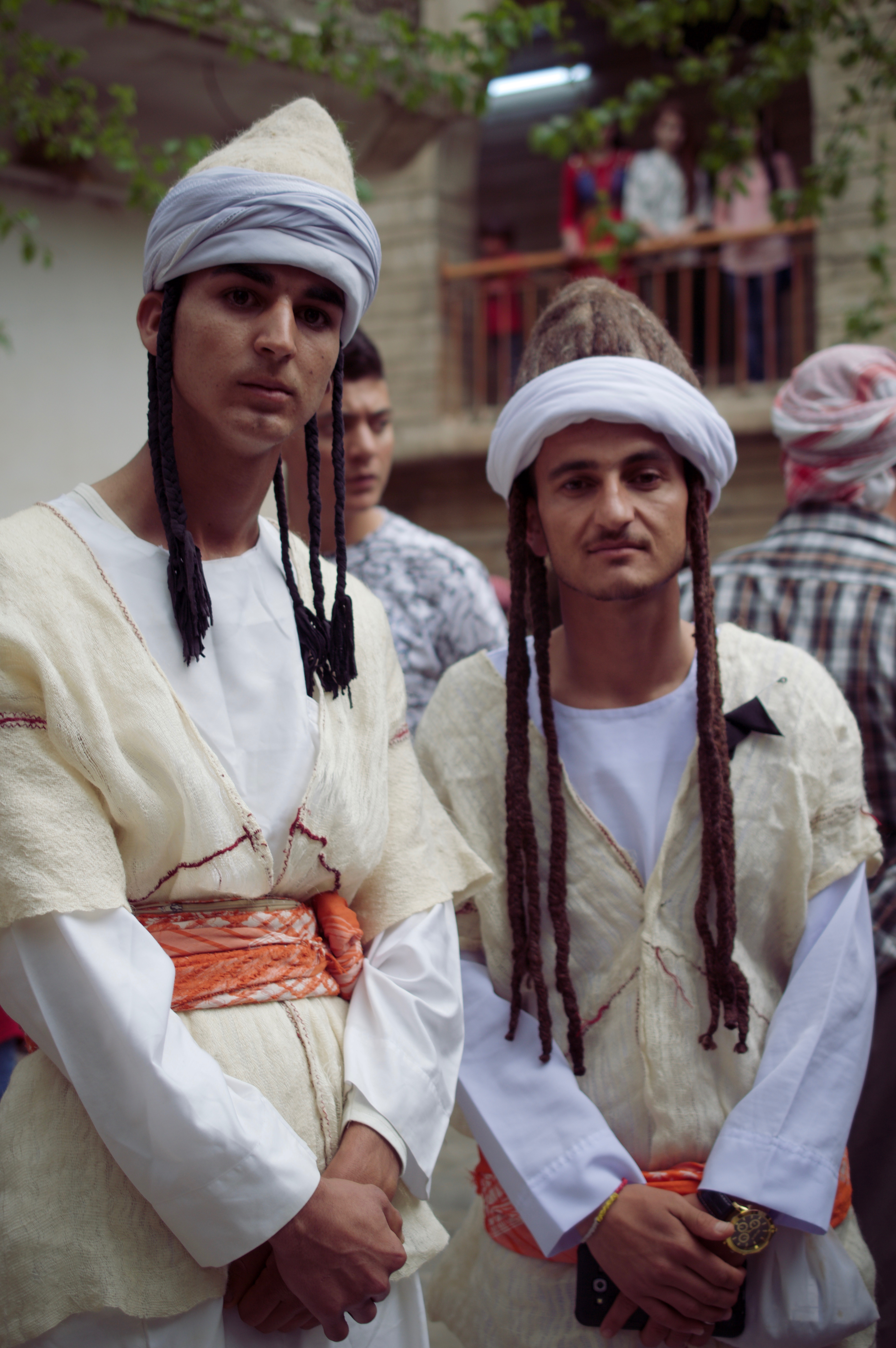
Yazidis pilgrims

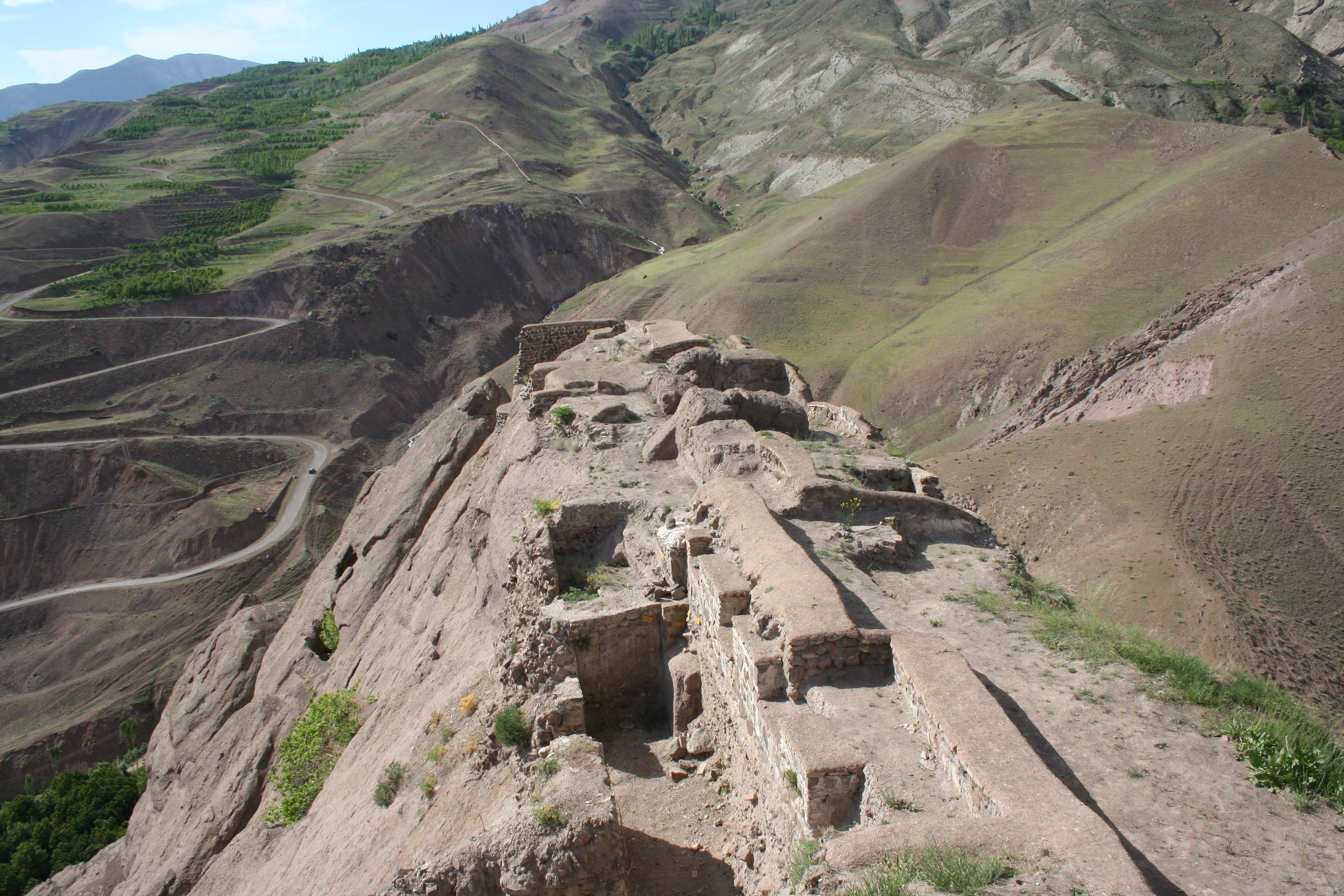
Alamut Castle

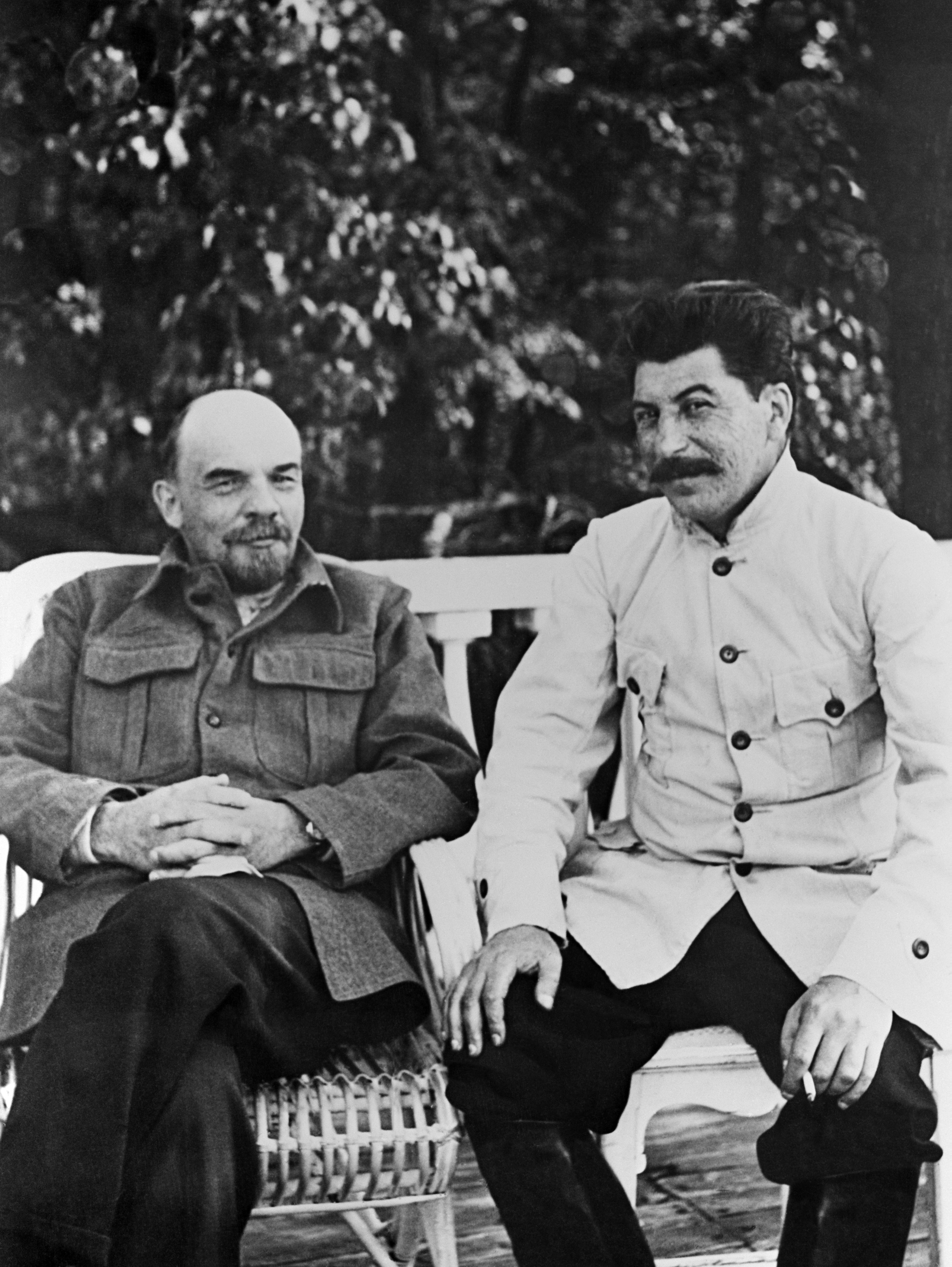
Lenin and Stalin, 1922

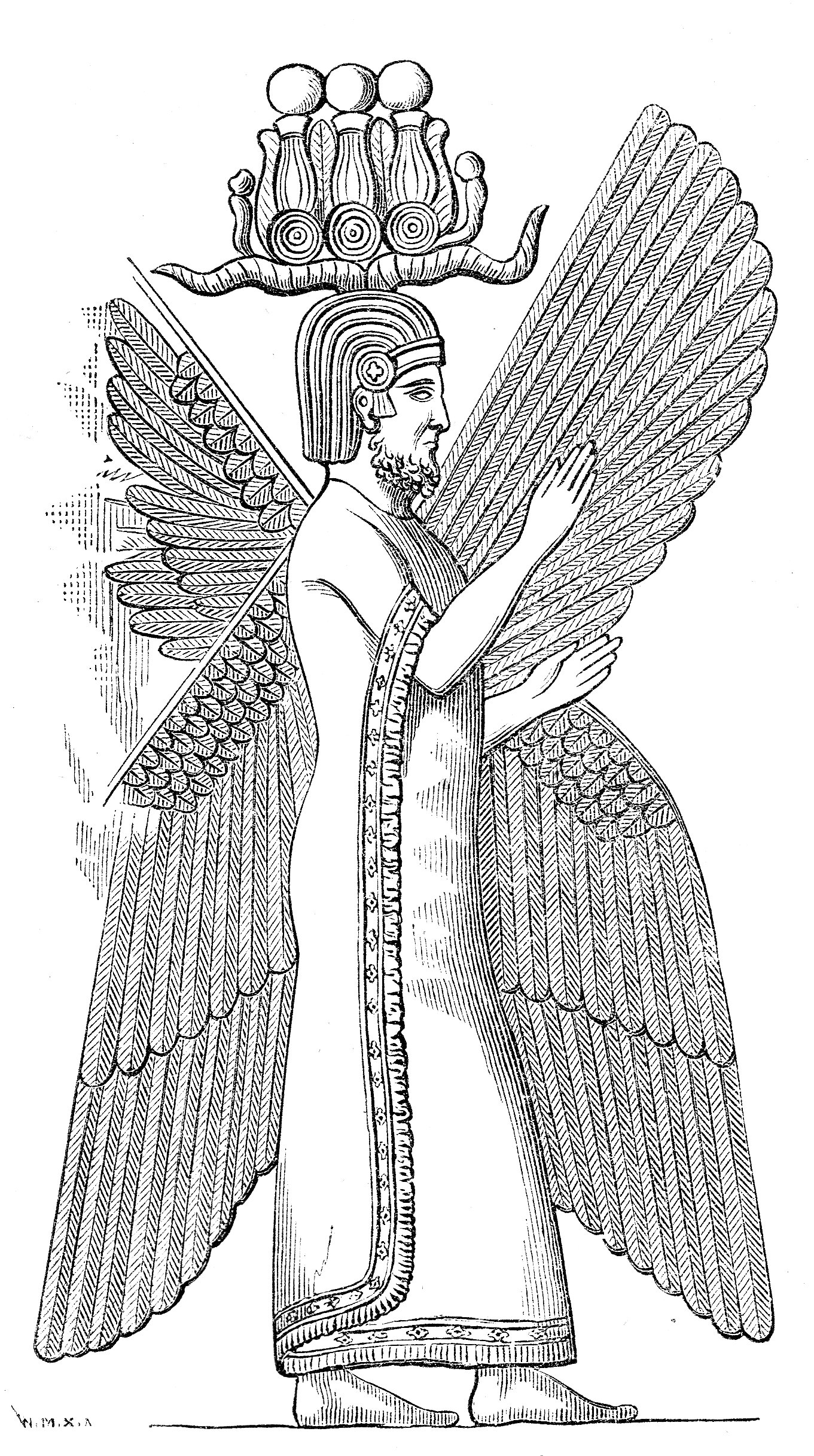
Cyrus the Great

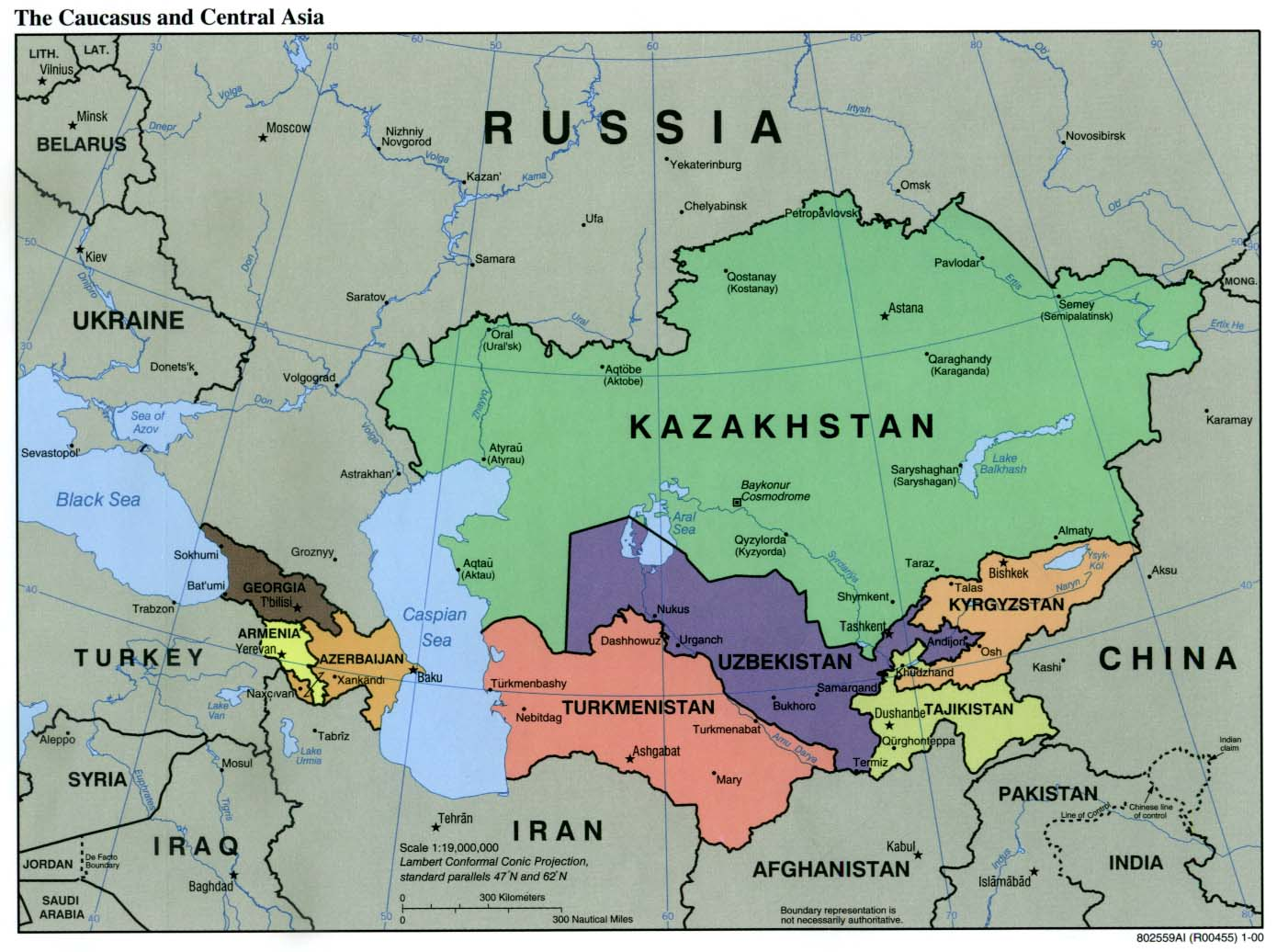
Caucasus and Central Asia political map 2000

== Notes and references ==
=== Sources ===
- Petitfaux, Dominique (1990). De l'autre côté de Corto : Hugo Pratt - Entretiens avec Dominique Petitfaux. Casterman. ISBN 2-203-38016-0.
- Le monde extraordinaire de Corto Maltese. Casterman. 2002. ISBN 2-203-34427-X.
- Hugo, Pratt; Pierre, Michel (1994). Les Femmes de Corto Maltese. Casterman.
- "Corto Maltese 1904-1925 : Récits du monde, escales du temps". L'Histoire, Hors série.
- GEO - Le monde extraordinaire de Corto Maltese. Casterman. 2002.
