= Corto Maltese =

Comics series

- Corto Maltese

Publication information
- Publisher: Ivaldi Editore; Casterman
- Genre: Adventure

Creative team
- Writer(s): Hugo Pratt; Juan Díaz Canales
- Artist(s): Hugo Pratt; Rubén Pellejero

Corto Maltese (/ˈkɔːrtoʊ mɔːlˈtiːz/ KOR-toh mawl-TEEZ; Italian: [ˈkorto malˈteːze, -eːse]) is a series of adventure comics following the eponymous protagonist, an adventurous sailor. It was created by the Italian comic book creator Hugo Pratt in 1967. The graphic novels have been translated into numerous languages and adapted into several animated films.

The series features Corto Maltese, an enigmatic sea captain who lives in the first three decades of the 20th century. He was born in Valletta on the island of Malta on 10 July 1887, the son of a sailor from Cornwall and a gypsy from Seville.

In his adventures full of real-world references, Corto has often crossed with real historical characters like the American author Jack London and his nurse Virginia Prentiss, the American outlaw Butch Cassidy, the German World War I flying ace Red Baron, and many others.

== Publication history ==
The character debuted in the serial Ballad of the Salty Sea, one of several Pratt stories published in the first edition of the Ivaldi Editore comics magazine Sergeant Kirk in July 1967. The story centers around smugglers and pirates in the World War I–era Pacific Islands. In 1970, Pratt moved to France and began a series of short Corto Maltese stories for the French comics magazine Pif Gadget, an arrangement lasting four years and producing many 20-page stories. In 1974 he returned to full-length stories, sending Corto to 1918 Siberia in the story Corto Maltese in Siberia, first serialised in the Italian comics magazine Linus.

In 1976, Ballad of the Salty Sea was published in book format and was awarded the prize for best foreign realistic comic album at the Angoulême International Comics Festival.

Pratt continued to produce new stories over the next two decades, many first appearing in the eponymous comics magazine Corto Maltese (published between October 1983 and July 1993), until 1988 when the final story Mu, the Lost Continent was serialised, ending in June 1989.

On October 7, 2014, Italian publisher Cong, who owns the rights to Corto Maltese, announced that a new album was being made by writer Juan Díaz Canales and artist Rubén Pellejero. "Under the Midnight Sun" was released in Europe on September 30, 2015 and takes place in 1915. In September 2017, a second album, "Equatoria", set in 1911, was published. In November 2019, a third album, "Tarowean’s Day", set in 1912–1913, was published. The fourth album by Canales and Pellejero was published in September 2022, entitled "Berlin Nocturne". It takes place in Berlin and Prague in 1924. A fifth album by Canales and Pellejero set in Mexico in 1929, "Life Line" was published in October 2024.

=== English translation ===
In English, Corto Maltese was first published in the United States by NBM Publishing in 1986 and in the United Kingdom by Harvill Press in 1996. The complete edition was subsequently released in 12 volumes by IDW Publishing between 2014 and 2018.

In 2026, Fantagraphics began releasing a new color edition of the complete Corto Maltese graphic novels, collected in 6 volumes.

== Character ==
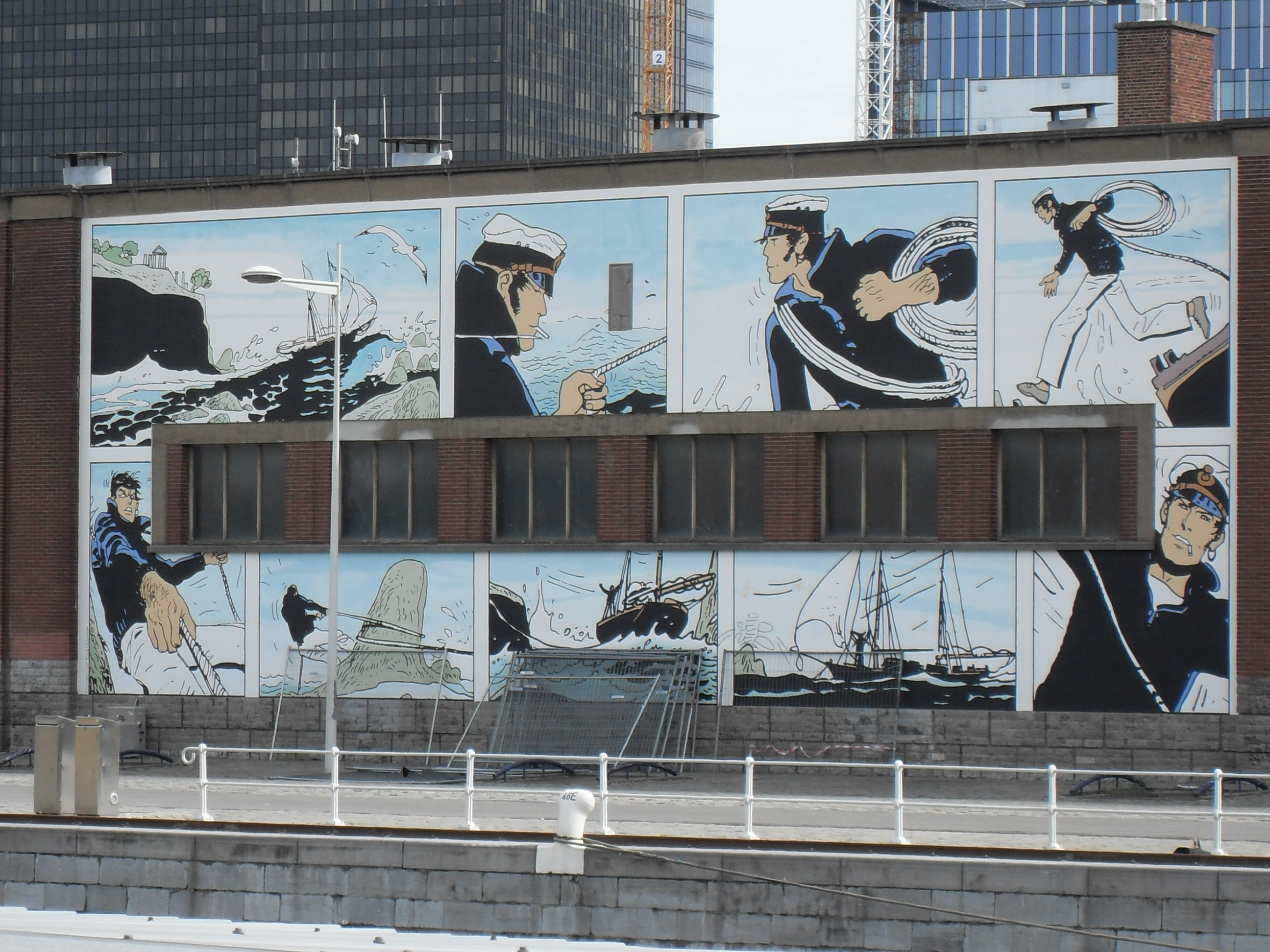
Part of a mural in Brussels dedicated to Corto Maltese, which reproduces a panel sequence from The Golden House of Samarkand, originally printed in black and white

Corto Maltese is a laconic sea captain adventuring during the early 20th century (1900–1920s). A "rogue with a heart of gold", he is tolerant and sympathetic to the underdog. Born in Valletta on July 10, 1887, he is the son of a British sailor from Cornwall and an Andalusian–Romani witch and prostitute known as "La Niña de Gibraltar" ("The Girl of Gibraltar"). As a boy growing up in the Jewish quarter of Córdoba, Maltese discovered that he had no fate line on his palm and therefore carved his own with his father's razor, determining that his fate was his to choose. Although maintaining a neutral position, Corto instinctively supports the disadvantaged and oppressed.

The character embodies the author's skepticism of national, ideological and religious assertions. Corto befriends people from all walks of life, including the murderous Russian Rasputin (no relation with the historical figure, apart from physical resemblance and some character traits), British heir Tristan Bantam, voodoo priestess Gold Mouth and Czech academic Jeremiah Steiner. He also knows and meets various real-life historical figures, including Jack London, Ernest Hemingway, Hermann Hesse, Butch Cassidy, James Joyce, Gabriele D'Annunzio, Frederick Rolfe, Joseph Conrad, Sükhbaatar, John Reed, White Russian general Roman von Ungern-Sternberg, Enver Pasha of Turkey and Sergei Semenov, modelled after Grigory Semyonov. His acquaintances treat him with great respect, as when a telephone call to Joseph Stalin frees him from arrest when he is threatened with execution on the border of Turkey and Armenia.

Corto's favourite book is Utopia by Thomas More, but he never finishes it. He also read books by London, Lugones, Stevenson, Melville and Conrad, and quotes Rimbaud.

Corto Maltese stories range from straight historical adventure to occult dream sequences. He is present when the Red Baron is shot down, helps the Jívaro in South America, and flees Fascists in Venice, but also unwittingly helps Merlin and Oberon to defend Britain and helps Tristan Bantam to visit the lost continent of Mu.

Chronologically, the first adventure, Corto Maltese: The Early Years, happens during the Russo-Japanese War. In other albums he experiences the Great War in several locations, participates in the Russian Civil War after the October Revolution, and appears during the early stages of Fascist Italy. In a separate series by Pratt, The Desert Scorpions, Corto is said to be missing in action in Spain during the Spanish Civil War.

== Chronology ==
The first Corto Maltese adventure, Una ballata del mare salato, Italian publication cover

This is a list of the twelve original Corto Maltese novels in chronological order. French editions were published by Casterman, Italian by Edizioni Lizard, English editions by IDW's EuroComics imprint.

- 1905 Corto Maltese: The Early Years (black and white 1981)
- 1913–1915 The Ballad of the Salty Sea (black and white 1967–1969)
- 1916–1917 Under the Sign of Capricorn (black and white 1971)
- 1917 Beyond the Windy Isles (black and white 1970–1971)
- 1917–1918 Celtic Tales (black and white 1971–1972).
- 1918 The Ethiopian (black and white 1972–1973) - previously available under the title Corto in Africa.
- 1918–1920 Corto Maltese in Siberia (black and white 1974–1975).
- 1921 Fable of Venice (black and white 1977).
- 1921–1922 The Golden House of Samarkand (black and white 1980).
- 1923 Tango (black and white 1985).
- 1924 The Secret Rose (black and white 1987).
- 1925 Mu, the Lost Continent (black and white 1988–1989).

In 2015 the series was continued by Ruben Pellejero and Juan Díaz Canales, with the following albums published thus far:

- 1911 Equatoria (2017, black and white/color).
- 1912–1913 Tarowean’s Day (2019, black and white/color).
- 1915 Under the Midnight Sun (2015, black and white/color).
- 1924 Berlin Nocturne (2022, black and white/color).
- 1929 Life Line (2024, black and white/color).

In 2021 a reboot series was launched by Martin Quenehen and Bastien Vivès reimagining the character for the 21st century.

- 2001 The Black Ocean (2021, black and white/color).
- 2002 The Queen of Babylon (2023, black and white).
- 2022 The Day Before (2025, black and white).

In 2026, a new album by Marco Steiner and Igort was announced, taking place after the events of Corto Maltese in Siberia.

- 1920 The House of the White Orchids (2026, color)

== Merchandising ==
- A Corto Maltese tarot deck was published by tarot publisher lo Scarabeo in 2008.

== Adaptations ==
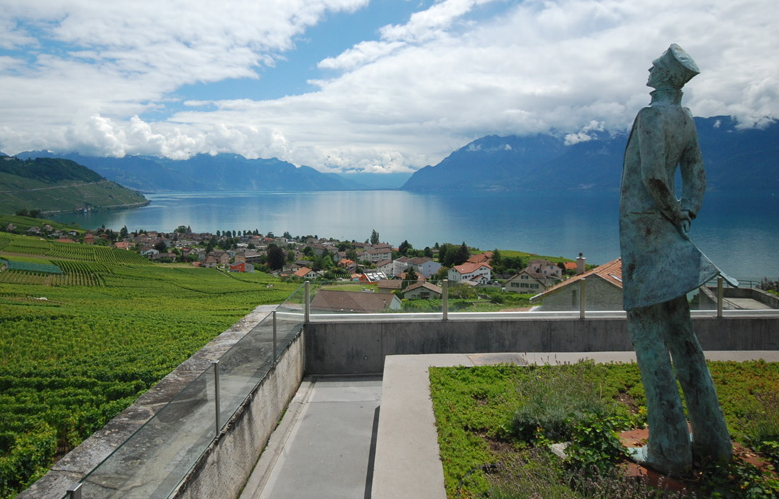
Statue of Corto Maltese in Grandvaux, Switzerland

- In 1975–1977, Secondo Bignardi produced semi-animated Corto Maltese stories for the RAI television programme Supergulp, fumetti in TV!.
- A French-language animated film, Corto Maltese, la cour secrète des arcanes adapting Corto Maltese in Siberia, was released in 2002. Also in 2002, Canal + produced a series of Corto Maltese adventures for television, adapting the stories The Ballad of the Salty Sea, Under the Sign of Capricorn, Celtic Tales and The Golden House of Samarkand. Canadian animator and cartoonist Guy Delisle documented his observations of colleagues working on one of these French-language adaptations at SEK Studio in North Korea in Pyongyang.
- On 20 September 2018, a new opera, Corto Maltese: The Ballad of the Salty Sea, based on the stories of Hugo Pratt, premiered at the Teatru Manoel in Valletta (Malta) by the Teatru Manoel Youth Opera, as part of Valletta 2018 European Capital of Culture. The production, which was commissioned and co-produced by the Valletta 2018 Foundation and Teatru Manoel, was an adaptation of The Ballad of the Salty Sea. The opera was composed by Monique Krüs with a libretto by director Corina Van Eijk, based on an original script by Tama Matheson. Stage and set designs were by Jolanda Lanslots.
- Christophe Gans was developing a new live-action film, for release in 2020. It was an adaptation of Corto Maltese in Siberia. It starred Tom Hughes as Corto and Milla Jovovich, and was to be produced by Samuel Hadida. However, it was cancelled due to legal problems.
- In November 2022, it was announced that Frank Miller is going to adapt the graphic novel into a six episodes hourlong TV series with StudioCanal for Canal+.

== See also ==
- Le Monde's 100 Books of the Century for Ballad of the Salt Sea
