= The Massive (comics) =

American comic book series

- Cover of The Massive Prologue (Dark Horse Presents #8). Art by Kristian Donaldson.

Publication information
- Publisher: Dark Horse Comics
- Schedule: Monthly
- Publication date: 13 June 2012 – 24 December 2014

Creative team
- Created by: Brian Wood
- Written by: Brian Wood
- Artist(s): Kristian Donaldson (Dark Horse Presents #8–10, #1–3); Garry Brown (#4–9, #13–21, #25-30); Gary Erskine (#10); Declan Shalvey (#11); Danijel Žeželj (#12, #22-24)
- Colorist(s): Dave Stewart (Dark Horse Presents #8–10, #1–9, #14–15); Jordie Bellaire (#10–13, #16–30)

The Massive is an American comic book series, created by writer Brian Wood. It was published by Dark Horse Comics between 2012 and 2014, followed by a prequel series, The Massive – Ninth Wave, in 2015. The series concerns the after-effects of a worldwide natural cataclysm called "The Crash", which has seen water levels rise drastically, and the efforts of the conservation activist group The Ninth Wave.

== Creation ==
Wood was inspired to create an ecological dystopian storyline due to his anxieties over the future of world for his young daughter. At the 2013 Chicago Comic & Entertainment Expo, Wood explained the premise: "Basically if you take all these projections you hear about what's going to happen in 20 years in terms of global warming or whatever, everything happens at once, all at the same time", and termed it "survivalist fiction". He described The Massive as a "stylistic and tonal" follow-up to DMZ.; while he acknowledged the possibility he would be accused of "ranting and soapboxing", Wood decided not to care, feeling he would never change the minds of those who disagreed with his views.

In contrast to his previous creator-owned works, Wood scaled back the research for the project as he felt examination of such in-depth scientific topics would "possibly fall short". He did, however, draw on the ecological non-fiction book Four Fish, the impact of the 1900 Galveston hurricane, and consulted maps to ensure the story's geography was accurate. Wood also consulted his sister-in-law, an agent for the National Oceanic and Atmospheric Administration. He felt the "three big mysteries" of The Massive were the cause of The Crash, the nature of Mary, and the location of The Massive, and felt the resolution would be "polarizing".

Regarding the characters, Wood reflected he found "a lot of pleasure in creating very flawed, very relatable characters and then putting them through the worst situation possible," and felt it was more personal than his work on X-Men and Star Wars. Various terms in the series, including the name of the Ninth Wave organization, were inspired by Norse mythology. Initially he collaborated with Kristian Donaldson, who he had previously worked with on Demo (2003-2004), Supermarket (2006), and issues of DMZ (2005-2012).

== Publishing history ==
The series was originally intended to be created for DC Comics' Vertigo imprint, coming close to signing contracts, but editorial changes at the company, including the departure of Karen Berger, led Wood to take the project to Dark Horse, which he felt he would provide better control of the rights.

The series debuted in anthology title Dark Horse Presents #8-10, in three eight-page prelude strips. An ongoing series was announced at the 2011 New York Comic Con. John Paul Leon provided covers for the series. which were usually done months ahead of the interior art for the individual issues

The three-part prelude was released on Dark Horse's website on 22 April 2012 to tie in with Earth Day. While Wood felt trade paperbacks were the best format for the series, he put effort into the single issues to provide readers with "bang for the buck". As a result, the first six issues contained written backmatter mini-essays by Wood. The series was structured in three-issue plot-arcs, in contrast to the six-issue pattern of DMZ. Wood felt this allowed denser stories to be fitted into the 30 issues. Wood used flashbacks as a device to swiftly begin the action while providing context and backstory.

Issue 3 saw Garry Brown take over from Donaldson as artist; he would remain for the bulk of the run, with Gary Erskine, Declan Shalvey, and Danijel Žeželj providing fill-in issues for 'one-shot' storylines. Wood deliberately requested widescreen visuals for the series. Brown's attitude towards the series' environmental concerns reflected those of the writer, and at Wood's suggestion watched the documentary series Whale Wars in preparation. He also researched oil rig construction. The wide shots, Wood felt, provided greater scope and context for storytelling.

Ahead of the release of The Massive #7, Wood reflected on the supposed utopia of Moksha Station, "I think human nature -- our base instincts -- always wins out over ideology" Moksha Station was partly inspired by self-proclaimed micronation Sealand. An arc featuring whalers was a deliberate reference to Wood's series Northlanders As the series went on, Wood received plaudits from Greenpeace and the Sea Shepherd Conservation Society, something he described as "flattering".

After solicitations for The Massive #16 failed to appear there were rumors the title had been cancelled, but after a short delay the series resumed. As the series unfolded, Wood had concerns that the story wouldn't fit as he fleshed out he scripts but was able to stick to his plan for the series and complete the story in 30 issues, and was pleased the twists in the plot hadn't been spoiled for readers. The 30th and final issue served as an epilogue to the series. Garry Brown describing finishing the series as "emotional".

In 2015, Wood and Brown reunited to produce six-issue prequel mini-series The Massive: Ninth Wave, again published by Dark Horse.

== Plot ==
=== The Crash ===
After narrowly avoiding death from rogue waves after a mission to a North Sea oil rig in 1995 as part of private military company Blackbell, mercenary Callum Israel experiences an epiphany. Quitting contract military work in 1997, he tracks down direct-action environmental activist group Ninth Wave, and uses his fortune to equip the group with two ships - the Kapital (a refitted Kingston-class coastal defence vessel purchased in Panama) and Massive (formerly a factory trawler, gifted to them by the South Korean government), renaming it as the Ninth Wave Conservationist Force. He also recruits former comrade Mag Narendha, and forms a relationship with mysterious Ninth Wave member Mary, the only member of the original group to stay on, and who he saw on the oil rig. Callum does not understand her survival, but accepts it, and the pair begin a relationship. He also becomes an avowed pacifist, only allowing a hunting rifle and some shotguns onboard each ship for contingencies. The Ninth Wave achieve celebrity initially, and are profiled on MTV; however, following a blockade of oil tankers in Haifa their fame turns into notoriety, and the organization spend weeks at the top of the FBI and Interpol's most wanted list on suspicion of involvement in the September 11 attacks.

A series of environmental disasters hit Earth in rapid succession. After a number of violent storms devastate the Cook Islands, the World Meteorological Organization created new storm categories (Cat. 6–9) to classify them in January; the following month magnetic storms bring down most of the planet's orbital satellites, while record snowfall hits Canada. Falling water levels see the Suez Canal abandoned in March, oil platforms are set on fire by underwater landslides and pollute the Baja California peninsula, and Hong Kong is devastated by an earthquake in May. The following month Iceland is effectively destroyed when the volcano Grímsvötn erupts, while the Eastern Seaboard of the United States loses power permanently, the Cortes Bank is drastically changed and a United States Navy battlegroup is sunk by the sudden release of methane from the sea floor. Taiwan is submerged by September, and in October a damaged Royal Navy nuclear submarine explodes in the Strait of Magellan. On November 11 the global economy crashes, while mass bird deaths are reported. The Ninth Wave's vessels report on mass emigration by whales and the break-up of Antarctic ice. Callum initially wants the group to put its resources towards rescue efforts at the nearest port but is out-voted by Mary and Mags, who believe they will just be absorbed and wasted in any government response and can do more good by weathering the crisis at sea. Instead they resupply at the remains of Hong Kong, where Cal and Mary narrowly survive a mugging. Despite Mags' belief they now need to be armed, Cal and Mary vote to retain the organization's Nonviolence Charter

=== Landfall ===
The effects of the Crash separate Kapital from Massive on November 29. Callum, Mags and Mary are all on board the smaller Kapital at the time, which is captained by Lars. The search for Massive brings them to the coast of Siberia, where they are attacked by pirates. Mary takes one of the ship's launches to draw them off, but loses contact with the Kapital. Cal reluctantly orders the pursuit of the Massive to continue without her, and they seemingly make radio contact with the larger ship. However, when the Kapital closes on the signal all they find is an abandoned launch with a radar transponder, broadcasting a pre-recorded distress signal. In deep fog, the Kapital stumbles on to the pirates' base and is forced to flee East. Callum correctly deduces Mary's launch is heading towards Unalaska, site of a secret US military supply dump, and they are reunited. On board the Kapital, technical expert Georg is unable to break most of the code running from the transponder, something Mag orders him to keep secret.

=== Black Pacific ===
Needing a base of operations, the Kapital sails to Somalia, where Cal strikes a supply deal with a shady black market figure in Mogadishu. He also meets with Arkady, a former Blackbell comrade now providing security in the city, overseeing shark fins, now a valuable commodity. He warns Cal he plans to take control of the Kapital. Mary and American Ninth Wave member Ryan are then landed at Coats Land to collect pure ice for drinking water from boreholes. However, they find the facilities have been compromised and are captured by looters, who plan to kill them by dropping the pair in the sub-zero boreholes. Mary is somehow able to get them to the drill's underwater cabin and revive Ryan, and after they recover uses the same technique to get them back to the surface, where Mag has arrived by helicopter. Mary secures the station, effectively claiming it for the Ninth Wave. Near the Marshall Islands, the Kapital finds the Caledonia-Ursk, a seemingly drifting container ship. With some reluctance Cal allows Mag to go on board to see if it is abandoned and a legitimate target for salvage. He and Georg board the vessel armed with contraband automatic weapons, but the latter is shot by a sniper moments later. The tanker is under S.A.S. guard and escorted by an Archer-class patrol vessel, but Mags is able to persuade the guards to give them some food to avoid the Ninth Wave giving away the Caledonia-Ursk and its valuable British government supplies. Cal remains unaware of the combat onboard however, and Mags has Ryan treat Georg's bullet wound in secret.

=== Subcontinental ===
A few weeks later, the Kapital reaches Moksha Station - a new society located in international waters at the Indian Ocean made up of mobile oil rigs that has declared itself a neutral sovereign nation. The ship and its crew are received warmly by the settlement's chief superintendent director, Sumon, but the station is put into lockdown when a cyclone approaches. Cal returns to the ship to supervise it being moved to safety, but Mary disappears. With Callum unable to return, Lars attempts to move the Kapital out to sea, only to find Moksha's forces blocking him. Meanwhile, Mary sabotages the station's radio system before plunging into the sea, with Sumon's security forces believing she is dead until they recover her alive. Concurrently Mag, Georg and Ryan take the transponder from the Massive to Yusup, an old acquaintance based at the station and expert engineer, for investigation. Cal visits Mary, but she asks to see Mag; a furious Sumon has Cal beaten unconscious, and when he wakes, Mag tells him Mary is planning to defect to Moksha, taking the Kapital with her. Lars attempts to free the Kapital using improvised depth charges. Meanwhile, Sumon reveals to Cal that he had acute myeloid leukemia, something he has suspected for some time. Georg meanwhile boards a Chinese Xia class submarine harbored at the station as a deterrent; Mary had discovered it on her swim and planned to sabotage the vessel with Mag's help, but Georg instead kills everyone onboard and seizes control of it for himself. Mag frees Cal, and the Ninth Wave pulls out of Moksha. Ryan passes a CD onto Mag, containing the audio from the transponder. After they leave, a coalition of nearby nationals storm and dismantle Moksha Station, which had been running black communication traffic for numerous nations in return for its neutrality.

=== Polaris ===
As time passes without contact with the Massive, morale plunges on board the Kapital, especially after one of the crew dies after drinking Ethanol and falling from the deck. The chase takes them close to South America, where Peru and Ecuador are in conflict as their resources dwindle following the nuclear explosion in the Strait of Magellan. A mutiny breaks out on board, three Peruvian members of the crew holding Cal at gunpoint, wanting to return to their families. He refuses, as taking them into territorial waters could see the ships seized, and greatly reduce their changes of locating the Massive. Instead, he drops them off in a Zodiac a hundred miles from the coast. Nine others join them, while over half the remaining crew also decide to leave. Meanwhile, Mary is growing suspicious of Cal's increasing sickness. While the under-crewed Kapital is again able to lock onto the Massive after the detour it remains frustratingly out of sight; Cal orders Mary to search in the helicopter, despite Mag's misgivings on using the last of their avgas in the endeavor. However, it loses control and crashes on the Farallon Islands. Both Mary and pilot Jon survive, but find the island empty when it should be full of seabirds. She makes for a Ranger station, but Jon is killed by a Megalodon, brought up from the deep seas by the changing climate. Great white sharks surround the island but after diving into the water and communicating with the megalodon they disperse. By the time Lars arrives in a dinghy the waters are clear. She tells him Cal has cancer as they return. Trailing the Massive North leads the Kapital to the Arctic Circle, and Lars is becoming more and more frustrated by the process, while Cal sits on the bridge endlessly attempting to make radio contact. The ship becomes trapped in ice as a storm closes in, and Cal sets off over land after sighting the Massive. It is actually a Nunatak; Devastated, he attempts to kill himself, but is stopped by the following Mary, who takes him back to the ship, which the remaining crew free from the ice.

=== Americana ===
Having given up on chasing the Massive, the Kapital as sailed to the East Coast of the United States, attempting to track down Georg's submarine before he triggers a nuclear exchange by firing on Moscow as Cal resolves to have the Ninth Wave clear up its messes. New York and much of the Eastern Seaboard is now underwater, and what remains of the American Government has relocated to Denver. Ryan attempts to desert, but is stopped by Mag shortly before the Kapital is challenged by US Navy helicopters from a naval battle group. Cal quickly works out the unit has gone rogue but they open fire until Ryan walks out on deck, holding her passport. She is taken and returned as a negotiator (actually bugged) before George surfaces and attacks the fleet. Cal uses it as an opening to get the Kapital among the buildings still above the waterline. Georg contacts Mag by radio and declares he will lead the Americans away from the Kapital before launching the submarine's missiles; however, they vanish in the atmosphere, something Mag suspects is Mary's doing as he grows more distrustful of her.

=== Longship ===
The Kapital travels to Norway, where Bors Bergsen - an old enemy and ardent right-wing traditionalist - is leading the population of Blackstave village back into whaling, using replica Viking longboats and methods. Bergsen believes whaling is a valid survival tactic in the post-Crash world, but Cal disagrees. Mag is less certain, feeling the booming whale population means Bergsen's settlement is doing negligible harm. He is outvoted, despite Mary having left mysteriously, as both Lars and Ryan agree. The latter pair go ashore to function as overwatch. Bergsen anticipates this and takes his trio of boats out to confront the Kapital. The longboats are able to use the Ninth Wave's tactics for slowing larger slips against them, while Lars and Ryan are captured by one of Bergen's followers. Bergen hurls a harpoon onto the bridge of the Kapitaland leaves it dead in the water, before returning to butcher a minke whale in full view of the helpless Ninth Wave. At Blackstave, the village elders gather, furious that Bergsen has brought the attention of the Ninth Wave down on them, but he remains defiant. Arkady arrives in Blackstave and approaches him, offering to help him kill Cal. However, Cal has landed in the ship's Zodiac and shoots Bergsen as he is out horse-riding. Looking for Cal, Mag discovers his medication and realises he has cancer. Meanwhile, Bors has survived the shot and returns fire, claiming Cal never stopped being a soldier and deducing that Mary has left him; Cal begs him to share how he dealt with the pain of the loss of his wife in the Crash. Bergsen's followers meanwhile return the empty Zodiac as a gesture, and one of the elders offers to strike a deal with Mag - who agrees that Blackstove will hunt a quota of five whales a year. Meanwhile, Bors tells Cal that Arkady has planted explosives on the Kapital, before throwing himself over a cliff. He is given a Norse funeral.

=== Bloc ===
The explosives set by Arkady badly damage the Kapital; in response, Cal resolves to deal with his old enemy. Mag finds him at a Blackbell weapons cache in Riga, and the pair head to Minsk to find Arkady. However, Cal gives Mag the slip when the latter falls asleep, and heads off to the real meeting in Vilnius. He is met by Yusup, who accidentally gives away Mag's attempts at decoding the transponder. Meanwhile, Mag awakes in Minsk - surrounded by armed Interpol agents. Yusup tells Cal he fell in with Arkady but his sympathies lie with Ninth Wave. He has attempted to decode the data from the transponder, and found the result to be a melody seemingly generated by sonar from the ocean floor rather than a transmission from the Massive. Cal recognises it as a tune he has heard Mary sing; he and Yusuf discuss how she hasn't seemed to have aged, and Yusuf notes he has been unable to find any trace of her in any public or private data. He also posits that the Massive is avoiding the Kapital. Interpol meanwhile tell Mag they will let him go in return for details of all Blackbell's caches; when they press for Cal, he tells them he has died. He is freed by Arkady, who offers him a deal and takes Mag to Prague - where Yusuf is also taking Cal. The meeting will take place at St. Vitus Cathedral, where Arkady continues to propose an alliance with Mag. Yusuf arrives with Cal, who is berated by Mag for keeping him in the dark. However, he then retrieves a hidden gun and shoots Arkady, who is finished off by Cal. Realising he has been wrong, Cal agrees to rework Ninth Wave with Mag as an equal partner; Yusup also joins the group. Back on board the Kapital they try to work out Mary's connection to the Crash and the missing Massive; Cal reveals he first heard Mary sing the melody while they were holidaying in the Cook Islands, the day before the Crash started.

=== Sahara ===
A pregnant Mary has appeared in Saudi Arabia, where she gets work on a convoy of water trucks set for Morocco, a well-paying mission since the Nile has dried out. With all the men needed to man the country's remaining oil rigs and water drilling projects, the job of security has been given to the women, with only the drivers on the convoy being male. Mary soon forms a bond with the five women she heads on one of the trucks; during a sandstorm she tells them of the Dust Bowl. Their driver and navigator argue, and the former shoots the latter. Realizing they will be blamed as second-class citizens, Mary smothers the driver and they leave their bodies in the sandstorm. They take over driving the truck, and Mary promises her crew they will get through this. The convoy has reached Egypt but a security check is announced; Mary tells them that the men ran into the desert during the sandstorm and is able to convince them it is not worth the loss of commission sending them back at this point. In Libya, Mary's military experience drives off a bandit raid. As they cross the Moroccan border Mary gives birth, and has deduced that they are unlikely to be paid, or returned to Saudi Arabia. The convoy reaches Marrakesh, where the trucks are subjected to a precise, grueling weigh-in process. When their truck reaches the weighing point, Mary shoots out its tires, causing a delay, and threatens to have the water tanks purged unless safe passage home is guaranteed. Unable to face their bosses if such a loss occurs, their handlers agree. Mary then simply leaves, and uses a cellphone to call Cal.

=== Ragnarok ===
On board the Kapital, loss of contact with a resupply point at Swansea and other data leads Ryan to posit that the Crash hasn't actually finished. Earth's gravity increases, tearing the remaining satellites from orbit and killing thousands, and further storms rock the ship, causing mass electromagnetic pulses. Cal receives Mary's call and they head to North Africa to meet her and his daughter. She promises to tell him everything. Mary tells him their daughter is called Yeva, and that she crawled out of the sea as a baby with the Earth as her mother, and of her presence at numerous ecological disasters. Above, every aircraft inexplicably falls out of the sky, as do the few remaining satellites and space stations. Lars meanwhile declares his love for Ryan, while Mag realizes his stash of weapons will be useless in whatever is coming and casts them over the side. With no radar, radio or GPS the crew are forced to navigate by traditional methods, and Mag identifies Cape Town as the most likely location to have survived the latest events. On the way, they run straight into the Massive. The ship is initially unresponsive, and the crew of the Kapital board the ship, apart from Yusuf and Ryan. They detect a huge freak wave heading towards them at speed, set to arrive in two hours. On board the Massive, Mary reveals she arranged for a skeleton research crew to stay on board, led by Doctor Manu Ibrahim. He shows them advanced harvesting areas, an irrigation system and many other features before Cal collapses again. As the storm hits, Ryan and Yusuf move across to the Massive; Mag and Lars watch with mixed feelings as the empty Kapital sinks. Below, Mary tells Cal that this was the mission all along, and that with everything in place on the Massive the Ninth Wave will survive to rebuild.

A huge, floating landmass appears in the Indian Ocean, attracting military attention; fighting soon breaks out. The Massive reaches Cape Town, and Mary goes ashore with Mag and Yeva. Mag finally realizes he saw Mary when nearly drowning as a child; they walk to the Helderberg Nature Reserve, and he attempts to wrap his head around what she is before pleading with her to save Callum. On board a surviving DARPA-ISRO-CNSA shuttle the crew watch as huge chunks of rock fly up from Earth, destroying the ship. Meanwhile, Mag has returned to the Massive, Mary having told him even Cape Town wouldn't be safe, and has given them a grid of the ocean to head towards. Below, Mary says goodbye to Cal and Yeva before slipping away and jumping into the sea. Around the world fresh disasters unfold - Mount Fuji erupts, the remainder of Hong Kong collapses into the sea, missile silos in the United States explode, Africa floods and landmasses are changed. Below, Cal wakes and grasps his daughter. Five weeks later, Lars has rigged sails on the Massive as they search for land. Cal's cancer has disappeared but he takes a backseat to Mag in running the ship, which now functions as an exploration vessel as the crew tries to map the much-changed world; instead he cares for the rapidly-growing Yeva. Lars sights land, and the Massive heads towards it.

== Characters ==
- Mary: a mysterious figure who resembles a 25-year-old woman, but has not aged for centuries. She first encounters Callum Israel she is part of a radical activist group that seizes control of a North Sea oil rig, and is able to survive the rogue wave that hits the structure. Her explanation for her survival is that "the sea is not finished with her". She can survive underwater indefinitely. A reformed Cal tracks her to a hippie commune in San Francisco in 1999 and is inspired to join Ninth Wave, with Mary as second in command. He believes her to be a student from Harare, and she tells other members of the group she is a Hutu who served as a child soldier in the Rhodesian Bush War.

Mary has been present at numerous points in Earth's history, especially ecological disasters, including the end of the Norse colonization of North America, the Spanish conquest of Yucatán, the creation of the Wyoming Territory, the First Battle of Ypres, the Dust Bowl, nuclear testing at Bikini Atoll, the Bhopal disaster and the Chernobyl disaster

Wood was very guarded about Mary's role during the series' publication and even at the end refused to classify her, noting that readers had described her variously as "a god, a superhero, an alien, Gaia, mother nature, a Christ figure..." and many predicted a superhuman twist.

- Callum Israel: born in Sitakunda, Bangladesh in 1966. Callum joined the private military company Blackbell in 1984, becoming a skilled soldier. He began to have doubts over mercenary life after a raid on a building in Zaire that turned out to be a clinic, and quit entirely after narrowly surviving death from a freak wave on a mission to a North Sea oil rig on New Year's Day 1995. He considered suicide before spending the next four years searching for Mary before finding her in San Francisco. He then devoted the wealth he had acquired from mercenary work to radically overhaul Ninth Wave, purchasing the Kapital in Panama in 2000. His actions with Ninth Wave saw him stand trial in Oslo for interfering with whaling; he was found not guilty to the lack of evidence.
- Mag Nagendra: born in Komari in the Bay of Bengal in 1974. At age 10 he was saved from drowning by Mary after straying too close to boats dumping chemical waste, though he does not fully recall this. At age 16 he joined Tamil Eelam and fought in the Sri Lankan Civil War before later serving with the Pakistan Border Forces during the Gulf War. Watching the Kuwaiti oil fires converted him to environmentalism. He served alongside Callum Israel at Blackbell and in 2003 was recruited as third mate for Ninth Wave, where he bends the organization's pacifist creed to its limits.
- Lars: skipper of the Kapital, born in Norway. Despite his youth a highly capable sailor and navigator, though he gets twitchy when the ship isn't sailing.
- Ryan: the only American member of the Kapital's crew and in her early 20s. Ryan grew up in Minneapolis, and was recruited into Ninth Wave when attending the University of Vermont.
- Yusup: a Russian engineer who designed Caspian Sea oil platforms before the crash. Wood described the character as having "Russian sort of shoulder-shrugging so-be-it attitude".
- Arkady: a comrade of Cal and Mag at Blackbell, born to Russian immigrants in America. While working for Blackbell he was amoral and hard even by mercenary standards, and remains in private security after the crash.
- Georg: a Chechen Ninth Wave member, Georg was 15 when his father was killed in the first battle of Grozny, and fought against the Russians in the second, leaving him with a deep hate of the invaders. He spent several years in a Russian prisoner-of-war camp after being abandoned on a Blackbell mission after being abandoned in Charles de Gaulle Airport in 2001.

== Collected editions ==
Title	ISBN	Release date	Issues
The Massive Vol. 1 - Black Pacific	9781616551322	26 March 2013	Material from Dark Horse Presents #8-10 and The Massive #1-6
The Massive Vol. 2 - Subcontinental	9781616553166	18 December 2013	The Massive #7-12
The Massive Vol. 3 - Longship	9781616554460	25 June 2014	The Massive #13-18
The Massive Vol. 4 - Sahara	9781616555085	31 December 2014	The Massive #19-24
The Massive Vol. 5 - Ragnarok	9781616556525	24 June 2015	The Massive #25-30
The Massive: Ninth Wave	9781506700090	1 November 2017	The Massive: Ninth Wave #1-6
The Massive Omnibus Volume 1	9781506713328	3 July 2019	Material from Dark Horse Presents #8-10 and The Massive #1-15
The Massive Omnibus Volume 2	9781506713335	13 November 2019	The Massive #16-30

== Reception ==
The Massive has received strong praise from critics. Ross Burlingame of ComicBook.com listed the title among the ten best new comics of 2012. Reviewing the first collection, Joe Molloy or Inter-comics.com posited it "could be the smartest book that Brian Wood has ever written"., while Bleeding Cool were also highly positive. Complex critic Jason Serafino felt it was "baffling that this book doesn’t get more attention". In a retrospective review after the series finished, All Comic described it as "a series that needs to be read, remembered and reflected upon.".

=== Awards ===
- Dave Stewart won the 'Best Coloring' category at the 2013 Eisner Awards for his work on The Massive among other titles.
