= Brian Wood (writer) =

American comics artist

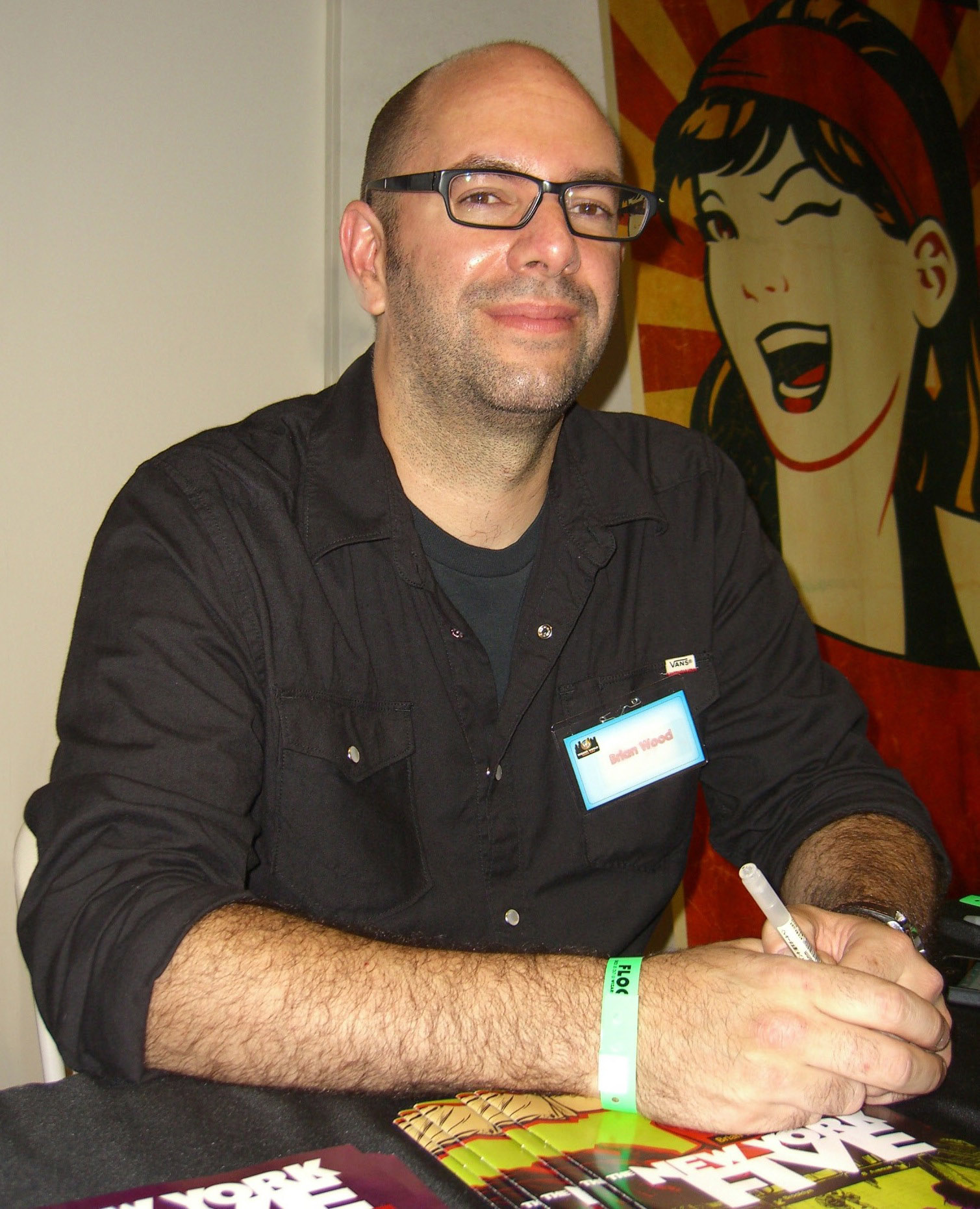
- Wood at the 2011 Big Apple Convention in Manhattan
- Born: January 29, 1972 (age 54); Essex Junction, Vermont, U.S.
- Education: The New School (BFA)
- Known for: Graphic design, graphic novelist, screenwriter, producer
- Notable work: Demo, DMZ, Northlanders

Brian Wood (born January 29, 1972) is an American writer, illustrator, and graphic designer, known for his work in comic books including DMZ, Demo, Northlanders, The Massive, Marvel Comics' The X-Men, and Star Wars, as well as writing television pilots, web series adaptations of his comics, and video game work including at Rockstar Games.

Wood's work contains sociopolitical commentary, particularly on the topics of media and conflicts, climate change, and identity. Much of his work is about or takes place in New York City.

== Early life ==
Brian Wood was born January 29, 1972, and grew up in the village of Essex Junction, Vermont, where he attended Hiawatha Elementary School and Essex High School. He is a lifelong stutterer, has spoken publicly about seeking therapy to deal with childhood trauma and the loss of his mother to cancer.

He moved to New York City in 1991, where he worked as a bike messenger, an experience of New York City that informed many of his future projects.

After graduating in 1997 from Parsons School of Design with a BFA in illustration, Wood worked a series of design jobs at internet startups, including iVillage, Bigfoot, and Nerve.

== Career ==
=== Early work ===
Wood's first professional work in comics was the five-issue dystopian limited series Channel Zero, published by Image Comics in 1998, which began as part of his graduation project for Parsons School of Design. Channel Zero was orphaned shortly after Image Comics sold out of the first print run of the collected edition, opting not to return to press, and AiT/Planet Lar acquired it soon afterwards. In 2012 Wood regained the publishing rights and Dark Horse Comics took up the publishing, releasing a "Complete Collection" that included the original graphic novel, the prequel series Channel Zero: Jennie One with Becky Cloonan, his Public Domain design book material, and numerous other extras from the early development of the property.

Following Channel Zero, Wood took a two-year break from comics. In early 2000, comic book writer Warren Ellis offered Wood a co-writing job on Marvel Comics' Generation X, as part of Ellis' Counter-X run. Wood co-wrote issues #63–70 with Ellis and 71–75 on his own, before the series was canceled as part of incoming Editor-in-Chief Joe Quesada's attempts to simplify the X-Men franchise. Wood would not work again with Marvel until 2012.

=== AiT/Planet Lar and original graphic novels ===
Wood was employed as a staff designer for Rockstar Games. While working there, he produced a series of original graphic novels. The first was Couscous Express with artist Brett Weldele, This was followed by a trilogy of bike messenger books, The Couriers, The Couriers: Dirtbike Manifesto, and The Couriers: Ballad of Johnny Funwrecker, all drawn by Rob G. Several characters are shared between Couscous Express and The Couriers, and in 2012 all four books were collected together and published by Image Comics.

Larry Young's AiT/Planet Lar heavily promoted Wood during this time, including designating the month of January 2002 as "Brian Wood Month" during which they offered exclusively his works. Wood also served as AIT's branding designer and overall creative director for a short period of time, and designed covers for Warren Ellis' Come In Alone, Badlands, and Black Heart Billy. In January 2007, Intrepid Pictures optioned the feature film rights to Wood and Rob G.'s graphic novel The Couriers with Javier Grillo-Marxuach set to pen the screenplay.

=== Demo, Local, and the single issue format ===
In 2003, Wood partnered with artist Becky Cloonan to create Demo, an anthology series of twelve 'done-in-one' or 'one-shot' stories about young people with superpowers. Although initially inspired by the aborted NYX project, the series was not traditionally superhero and instead compared emerging powers to autistic themes and tragic love stories. The series was well-received, and Wizard, a steadfastly superhero-oriented comics magazine, named Demo its 2004 "Indie of the Year". The series was also nominated for two Eisner Awards in 2005, for "Best Limited Series" and "Best Single Issue" (for #7, "One Shot, Don't Miss"). Thirteen Minutes cites Wood and Demo as "blipping a young artist named Becky Cloonan onto everyone's collective radar screen, and cementing Wood's relationship with this frequent collaborator."

Wood and Cloonan moved Demo from AiT/Planet Lar to Vertigo Comics in 2008, announcing a "Volume 2" of the series, upping the total number of short stories to 18. In 2015, Wood and Cloonan took the publishing rights to Dark Horse Comics, producing the single volume The Complete Demo.

The Demo format proved successful so Wood went on to replicate it, with some changes, for his 12-issue series Local at Oni Press, which launched in 2005 and was drawn by artist Ryan Kelly. NPR named it one of its Best Graphic Novels of the year and called it a "contemporary ballad to the idea of the open road... Megan moves from state to state, dealing with roommates and dead-end jobs and looking for an existence that befits her intelligence and desire for authenticity. She's not a lost cause; she simply chooses, for personal reasons, to drift a while."

=== DMZ, Northlanders, and DC Comics exclusivity ===
Demo was the book with which Wood and Becky Cloonan first gained Vertigo's attention. Editor Will Dennis approached Wood and invited him to pitch, and editor Shelly Bond hired Becky Cloonan to illustrate the series American Virgin. The inspiration for DMZ had come to Wood in early 2003, at a time when the 9-11 incident in New York City and the invasion of Iraq dominated the U.S. national psyche. Wood had just moved to San Francisco from New York City, and the experience of recalling in that political atmosphere the memories and story ideas he had accumulated over a decade living in the city instigated the creation of the artwork that would become the foundation of DMZ. Initially developed as Wartime, a five issue black-and-white miniseries, the comic was consciously a project of importance to Wood, representing a return to the perspective of his breakthrough work Channel Zero, a bleak portrayal of youth culture and anti-authoritarian expression in the repressive environment of Giuliani-era New York City. After the "Wartime" title had been disqualified as too close a title to a recent Books Of Magic miniseries, Wood considered a host of alternatives including "Embedded", "No Man's Land" and "The War for New York" before settling on "DMZ".

DMZ launched as a monthly series on August 9, 2005. It ran for seventy-two issues, and was collected in twelve trade paperbacks. A Deluxe Edition of five hardcovers were published in 2014, followed by softcover editions of same in 2016. A two volume compendium set was published in 2020.

In August 2006, DC Comics announced that Wood was signed to an exclusive contract. This was announced at the same time as Wood's second monthly title for Vertigo, the historical series Northlanders. Described as an anthology series that takes a realistic, "street level" looking at Vikings, the series ran for 50 issues before being cancelled due to low sales. It was collected into seven trade paperbacks, and then re-cut into three volumes that presents the stories in a different sequence than originally published.

In 2006, editor Shelly Bond announced Minx, a young adult graphic novel imprint aimed at the teenage girl market. Wood and artist Ryan Kelly produced The New York Four for the imprint. Years later, they would return for The New York Five, published under the Vertigo label. The sequel was nominated for an Eisner award in 2012 for Best New Limited Series. In 2014, Wood and Kelly took the books to Dark Horse Comics and produced the collected edition The New York Four, containing the complete story.

In 2008, Wood was nominated for Best Writer at that year's Eisner Awards, for DMZ, Northlanders, and Local.

During the term of his exclusivity to DC Comics, Wood also wrote DV8 Gods And Monsters for the WildStorm imprint, and a short run on the Supernatural licensed comic. In 2011, Wood was rumored to write the relaunched Supergirl series as part of DC's New 52 initiative, but it did not come to pass. This generated some confusion and commentary, particularly after DC's New 52 website inadvertently leaked Wood's name as the series writer. Wood stated, "I don't really know what I can and can't say about it, even now. But to answer at least part of your question, I did not turn down "Supergirl." I would have loved to be the writer on "Supergirl." I have over a year's worth of "Supergirl" story outlines and several scripts sitting right here." Soon after, Wood declined to renew his DC Exclusive.

In 2021, Wood reported that DC Entertainment had renewed the Northlanders publishing agreement.

Outside of the exclusivity, Wood wrote the miniseries Supermarket and the graphic novel The Tourist during this time, for publishers IDW and Image Comics respectively.

=== Return to Marvel and the "all-female" X-Men ===
In late 2011, Bleeding Cool reported that during Fan Expo Canada, Marvel teased a Brian Wood return in 2012, alongside an image of Wolverine's claw marks. CBR later revealed the project as Wolverine & the X-Men: Alpha and Omega, a four issue series with Mark Brooks on art. Wood then took over on the main, "adjective-less" X-Men title starting with #30 and wrapping up with #37.

Wood returned in 2013 with the #1 selling relaunch of X-Men with an all-female "A-list" roster: Jubilee, Storm, Rogue, Kitty Pryde, Rachel Grey and Psylocke. USA Today quoted Wood as saying, "I feel like as far as the X-Men go, the women are the X-Men. Cyclops and Wolverine are big names, but taken as a whole, the women kind of rule the franchise." The reaction to the title was mostly positive, but some took offense at the lack of male characters, and others at the execution. Journalist Laura Hudson interviewed Wood for Wired Magazine, and quoted him as saying, "There's too much cheesecake out there that is sold, or at least marketed, as a 'strong female' character or book when it's anything but, it just reinforces the worst opinions of the most sexist fans, and we gain no new ground. We probably lose ground. I'm not approaching this new X-Men as a 'female book,' but I'm writing it as a high action X-Men comic, and with some luck that will nullify some of these poisonous critics who go looking for something to feel angry/uncomfortable/threatened by." The title was included in the Battle of The Atom miniseries. Wood left the series in 2014 with issue #17, saying, "I left the title on my own accord, no drama, no pressure, just moving on," and writer G. Willow Wilson took over.

Brian Wood and Olivier Coipel created the Shogo Lee, Jubilee's adopted infant son. He appeared as a time-traveling adult hero Sentinel-X in Battle of the Atom.

Concurrent with the X-Men, Wood also took over monthly writing duties on Ultimate Comics: The X-Men with issue #13. He continued until issue #33. He and artist Paco Medina created the mutant Nomi Blume aka Mach Two. His final work for Marvel during this time was to take over writing the Moon Knight reboot Warren Ellis began. He scripted issues #7-12.

=== Image Comics and Dark Horse ===
Wood returned to Image with three miniseries: Mara with Ming Doyle, Starve with Danijel Žeželj and Black Road with Garry Brown.

The bulk of Wood's post-DC Comics creator-owned work happened at Dark Horse Comics. After exiting his exclusive contract, Wood signed on to write the publisher's long-running Conan the Barbarian title, adapting the well-loved "Queen of the Black Coast" short story with Becky Cloonan on art. The series ran for 25 issues. Wood also launched The Massive, a creator-owned series with artist Garry Brown, depicting a group of environmentalists grappling with an unexplained failing of the earth's ecosystems. After the series conclusion at issue #30, Wood and Brown created the six-issue prequel Ninth Wave. In the environmental novel Apocalyptic Ecology in the Graphic Novel by Clint Jones, he states, "[The Massive] comes closest to representing the complexity of real destruction in the case of a global catastrophe."

In 2013 Wood was approached by Dark Horse to head up a brand new Star Wars monthly title, one that uses the original cast of the 1977 film, a first for the publisher. Star Wars #1 debuted to positive reviews, selling out of its initial print run in 24 hours. Wood wrote the series up until issue #20, when Dark Horse lost the license to Marvel Comics. Wood's run is known for making Princess Leia an X-wing pilot, generating a lot of commentary, positive and negative.

Italian artist Andrea Mutti joined Wood in creating Rebels, a historical comic series set during the American Revolutionary War. Wood noted he found it relevant to modern political times. "The first story arc of Rebels is called 'A Well Regulated Militia,' and believe me, that was very specifically chosen to direct confront how loaded that phrase is these days," he says. "The Green Mountain Boys were America's first militia, and it's important to me to draw a very clear line between that and the guys that show up to Obama rallies with assault rifles on their backs, using that phrase to justify acting out." Publishers Weekly describes the series' main story as follows "by shorter slices of war that cover other concerns within the conflict, including those of women who played a role in combat, Native Americans who had to navigate the battle to ensure their own survival, and black combatants desiring actual independence in a war that focused on white men's freedom." They followed it up in 2017 with a second volume, titled Rebels: These Free and Independent States, dealing with the War of 1812. "We have the great political divide of the day, often boiled down to the contrast between Hamilton's Federalist stance and the more states-oriented Democratic-Republicans that Jefferson and Madison pushed for, manifesting in street rallies and back-of-the-pub arguments. We had the piracy in the Barbary states against American merchant ships, the Quasi-War in the Caribbean, John making a couple friends in the abolitionist movement, and the great lead-up to the War of 1812, America's second war with England."

Wood's final creator-owned project during this time was Briggs Land, a generational crime drama set in an American secessionist community, "the Sopranos as secessionists," Wood said. At the same time as announcing the comic series, the Hollywood Reporter announced the property was in development at AMC TV, with Wood both writing and executive producing. Wood said to Bleeding Cool, "I'm writing both, simultaneously. As a comic, its unfolding a little slower, since the 'container' of a 22-page comic is smaller than an hour-long premium cable show, which requires a hell of a lot of story and there's an expectation to get into the meat of it much quicker. In my head, it's two separate Briggs Lands – the one for comics, which is being done one way, and the TV one, which I'm developing differently." There has been no updates on the live action version of the project since Wood posted an image of a completed script.

That same year, Wood co-wrote the video game 1979 Revolution: Black Friday, with Navid Khonsari.

=== Aliens: Defiance, Zula Hendricks, and Amanda Ripley ===
Wood has written a number of series for the Aliens franchise, starting with the 12-issue Aliens: Defiance, which introduced the point-of-view character Zula Hendricks, an ostracized Colonial Marine suffering from injury and under a cloud of suspicion. He saw similarities between Zula and Ellen Ripley character, and strived to make the connection on the page. "I did take a hard look at Ripley, especially the Ripley in the original film, to figure out how one makes a Ripley-esque lead character since one of our goals with this comic is to create a ‘classic’ Alien story in the mold of the original film. Zula is cut from the same cloth as the crew of the Nostromo: blue collar people just looking ahead to the next paycheck dropped into a terrible situation and needing to struggle their way out of it. Ripley does all that, keeps her wits about her, her humanity, and her cool. I want to instill all of that in Zula, even if it's from a different perspective, that of a soldier. A young, passionate, walking-wounded soldier." The series also featured Ellen's daughter, Amanda Ripley, her first media appearance since the Alien: Isolation video game. "A pre-Isolation Amanda Ripley is [Zula's] only friend." Wood said.

Zula Hendricks, created by Wood and artist Tristan Jones, is canon, featured in the 2019 novelization of the video game Alien: Isolation and the novel Alien: Prototype.

In September 2018, Dark Horse announced Aliens: Resistance, written by Wood with art by Robert Carey. Set after Defiance, it features Zula Hendricks and Amanda Ripley continuing the search for Weyland-Yutani black ops experiments on the xenomorph. It was followed by Aliens: Rescue in 2019

A fourth Alien series, Colonial Marines: Rising Threat, was cancelled prior to publication. It was meant to star Olivia Shipp, a character from Alien: Echo, a young adult novel by Mira Grant.

=== Sword Daughter and DMZ at HBOMax ===
In June 2018, Wood and his Briggs Land collaborator Mack Chater launched a new monthly series, Sword Daughter. Described as a Norse - Samurai Cinema revenge mash-up, the team enlisted José Villarrubia as colorist. Dark Horse described the series as "a raw and violent story that is a testament to the power of redemption and the resiliency of family, and a visually stunning tribute to samurai cinema." There would be a total of nine issues of the series, published in three hardcovers, titled She Brightly Burns, Folded Metal, and Elsbeth Of The Island.

Wood also wrote and co-wrote several licensed comics during the late 2010s, EVE Online: Valkyrie, Terminator: Sector War, Mono, John Carter: The End, Planet of The Apes: Memorial, a short story for Megadeth: Death By Design, and RoboCop: Citizens' Arrest. He oversaw a reboot of Robotech for Titan Comics, writing two volumes of the series before turning the job over to Simon Furman.

In 2014 Warner Horizon were reported to be developing a DMZ television show with producers David Heyman and Andre and Maria Jacquemetton for the Syfy network. In January 2020, a new DMZ deal was announced, this time for HBO Max, with Ava DuVernay directing, Roberto Patino showrunning, and Rosario Dawson in a lead role. On November 19, 2020, Deadline reported that HBO Max has ordered DMZ to series with actors Hoon Lee, Freddie Miyares and Jordan Preston Carter joining the cast and Patino writing all four episodes.

== Unrealized projects ==
In 2001, Wood and artist David Choe were commissioned by Marvel to develop the concept of an X-Men series for the publisher's then-upcoming MAX imprint. Although the project was shelved at the time, it was later released with a different creative team, while Wood used his ideas to develop the creator-owned series Demo with artist Becky Cloonan.

A catalog entry for Dogs Day End appeared in 2008 from the publisher Top Shelf. Created by Wood with art by Nikki Cook, it never appeared. The catalog described it thusly: "Following up on the time-honored adage "you can't go home again", Dogs Day End details the personal journey of 30-year-old Andrew Maguire, pulled back to the small upstate hometown of his childhood by his mother as she enters the final stages of cancer." Chris Arrant of CBR asked Wood about it in 2010, and he explained, "A bunch of shit went wrong, ranging from schedule problems to my own writing problems, and after a few years I shelved it for a bit, reworked the story, found a new artist, and tried again. And it was at that point I realized that really the only problem was with me, and my inability to write that goddamn story. I think time's just passed it by, to be honest. I love the idea of it, but I just cannot make it work."

In 2012, Bleeding Cool and MTV reported a list of comic book projects Wood described as never making it off the ground. There were several DC Comics properties on the list - Green Arrow, Supergirl, Superman Beyond, Rima The Jungle Girl, "Gotham: Neighborhood Rebellion aka Catwoman Year 100", and what he termed "The Re-Imagined Wildstorm Universe." Three creator-owned titles are mentioned: QC, Anthem, and Starve. Starve was published by Image Comics in 2015. That same year, Wood was named as the new writer of Todd McFarlane's "resurrected" Spawn for the #251 relaunch. Shortly after appearing with MacFarlane at New York Comic Con, Wood announced he was no longer employed on the book, issuing this statement: "For the sake of readers and retailers who read the current Image solicits (March 2015), I just want to sent [sic] out a little PSA and say that I am not the writer of Spawn #251. I'm actually not the writer of the Spawn title after all. I delivered, to spec, the script for February's Spawn Resurrection #1 special but raised objections to the considerable extent to which my script and the larger plot was being rewritten during production. I was then removed from the job. I'm not trying to complain or spark drama, but I do think that the audience and the retailers laying down money for the book should be aware when there is a creative team change, especially this close to the book's release. I'm sorry to anyone who was looking forward to my work on Spawn – its a bummer for me too." Paul Jenkins replaced Wood.

== Awards and nominations ==
=== Nominations ===
- 2004 Eisner Award for Talent Deserving of Wider Recognition
- 2004 Eisner Award for Best Cover Artist (for Global Frequency)
- 2005 Eisner Award for Best Limited Series and Best Single Issue (for Demo #7)
- 2009 Harvey Award for Excellence In Presentation (for Local)
- 2017 Eisner Award for Best Limited Series (for Briggs Land)
- 2017 Games for Change Awards: Best Learning Game Finalist (for 1979 Revolution: Black Friday)

=== Wins ===
- 2007 Lucca Comics & Games Grand Jury Best Short Story (Demo's "Emmy")
- 2007 American Library Association's YALSA Great Graphic Novels for Teens (for Demo)
- 2008 Eisner Award for Best Writer (for DMZ, Northlanders, Local)
- 2015 American Library Association's YALSA Great Graphic Novels for Teens (for The Massive)
- 2015 Sundance Film Festival Official Selection (for 1979 Revolution: Black Friday)
- 2015 American Library Association's YALSA Great Graphic Novels for Teens (for Mara)
- 2016 IndieCade Award for Grand Jury Prize Winner (for 1979 Revolution: Black Friday)
- 2016 Bit Award for Best PC Game Winner (for 1979 Revolution: Black Friday)
- 2016 Serious Play Award for Best Game Winner (for 1979 Revolution: Black Friday)
- 2018 Facebook Game of the Year (for 1979 Revolution: Black Friday)

== Accusations of sexual misconduct ==
On November 13, 2013, cartoonist Tess Fowler publicly accused Wood of sexual harassment in offering her his hotel room number at a bar encounter during San Diego Comic-Con in 2003. Later that same month, Wood responded to Fowler with an apology, stating in part, "when she declined, that was the conclusion of the matter for me. There was never an exertion of power, no threats, and no revenge... I think the larger issues of abuse in the comics industry are genuine and I share everyone's concerns. I don't want our difference of accounts to take attention away from that industry-wide discussion that needs to happen." Fowler responded in part, "I've forgiven Brian years ago for the following story... I've moved on from what he did. I never asked for a boycott, or blacklisting, as I am being accused. I actually spoke very openly about the opposite. Brian Wood has every right to be a part of comics. To make books and make a living unhindered. I believe that. I also believe his behavior is a symptom of a much bigger disease."

In August 2019, Laura Hudson accused Wood of "grabbing" her and "forcing" her into a kiss at a bar in 2007. When approached by Comics Beat regarding the allegations, Dark Horse issued a statement to The Beat saying, "Effective immediately, Dark Horse will not pursue any new projects with Brian Wood." On August 21, 2020, The Comics Journal reported that following Hudson's employment on the Ava DuVernay-helmed adaptation of Wood's DMZ, she deleted the accusations against Wood.

== Bibliography ==
=== Early work ===
- Junkfoodcity Comics #1–3 (anthology self-published by Wood and Gavin Spielman, 1995–1996)
  - Each issue featured short stories written and drawn by Wood: "Beer Run" (#1), "The Evictor" and "Let's Lynch the Landlord" (#2), "Hyperkarma" (#3)
- The Daedalus Foundation (as artist, written by Dominic Lopez, one-shot, Big Wednesday Comics, 1995)
- Channel Zero: The Complete Collection (tpb, 296 pages, Dark Horse, 2012, ISBN 1-59582-936-9) includes:
  - Hectic (script and art, self-published mini-comic, 1996)
  - Clean (script and art, self-published mini-comic, 1997)
  - Pure #1–2: "Channel Zero 1.0" (script and art, anthology, Oxygen Studios, 1997)
- Tales of Midnight: "Response" (script and art, anthology one-shot, Blue Silver, 1998)
- No Justice/No Piece #2: "Cold Transfer" (as artist, written by Michelle Lo, anthology, Head Press, 1998)
- Astronauts in Trouble: Live from the Moon #1: "Stone, Cold" (as artist, written by Larry Young, co-feature, Gun Dog Comics, 1999)
- Just 1 Page: Heroes: "Buddy Bradley" (script and art, one-page strip in the anthology one-shot, Comic Festival, 2001)

=== Image Comics ===
- Channel Zero: The Complete Collection (tpb, 296 pages, Dark Horse, 2012, ISBN 1-59582-936-9) includes:
  - Channel Zero #1–5 (script and art, 1998) also collected as Channel Zero (tpb, 120 pages, 1998, ISBN 1-58240-082-2)
  - Channel Zero: Dupe (script and art, one-shot containing the 14-page Channel Zero story previously self-published by Wood, a new 3-page comic story and a 6-page prose story, 1999)
  - Liberty Comics #2: "Urban Combat" (script and art, anthology, 2009) also collected in CBLDF Presents: Liberty (hc, 216 pages, 2014, ISBN 1-60706-937-7; tpb, 2016, ISBN 1-60706-996-2)
- The Tourist (with Toby Cypress, graphic novel, 104 pages, 2006, ISBN 1-58240-597-2)
- Mara #1–6 (with Ming Doyle, 2012–2013) collected as Mara (tpb, 136 pages, 2013, ISBN 1-60706-810-9)
- Liberty Annual (anthology):
  - Liberty Annual '14: "Girl Band: In Space" (co-written by Wood and his daughter Audrey, art by Terry Dodson, 2014)
  - Liberty Annual '15: "Coming Next Year" (one-page illustration, 2015)
- Starve (with Danijel Žeželj, 2015–2016) collected as:
  - Volume 1 (collects #1–5, tpb, 120 pages, 2016, ISBN 1-63215-546-X)
  - Volume 2 (collects #6–10, tpb, 120 pages, 2016, ISBN 1-63215-832-9)
- Black Road #1–10 (with Garry Brown, 2016–2017) collected as Black Road: The Holy North (hc, 264 pages, 2018, ISBN 1-5343-0670-6)

=== AiT/Planet Lar ===
- Channel Zero: The Complete Collection (tpb, 296 pages, Dark Horse, 2012, ISBN 1-59582-936-9) includes:
  - Public Domain: A Channel Zero Designbook (collection of sketches and other miscellaneous material, 152 pages, 2002, ISBN 0-9709360-5-2)
  - Channel Zero: Jennie One (with Becky Cloonan, graphic novel, 72 pages, 2003, ISBN 1-932051-07-4)
- The Couriers: The Complete Series (tpb, 360 pages, Image, 2012, ISBN 1-60706-641-6) collects:
  - Couscous Express (with Brett Weldele, graphic novel, 88 pages, 2001, ISBN 0-9709360-2-8)
  - The Couriers (with Rob G., series of graphic novels):
    - The Couriers (sc, 88 pages, 2003, ISBN 1-932051-06-6)
    - The Couriers: Dirtbike Manifesto (sc, 88 pages, 2004, ISBN 1-932051-18-X)
    - The Couriers: The Ballad of Johnny Funwrecker (sc, 88 pages, 2005, ISBN 1-932051-31-7)
- Demo (with Becky Cloonan):
  - Demo #1–12 (2003–2004) collected as Demo: The Collected Edition (tpb, 328 pages, 2005, ISBN 1-932051-42-2)
    - In 2010, Wood and Cloonan produced a 6-issue sequel limited series, published by DC Comics' Vertigo imprint.
    - Both series were later collected by Dark Horse as Demo (tpb, 496 pages, 2015, ISBN 1-61655-682-X)
  - Demo: The Twelve Original Scripts (sc, 144 pages, 2005, ISBN 1-932051-30-9)

=== Marvel Comics ===
- Generation X (with Steve Pugh, Ron Lim (#68, 73, 75) and Alan Evans (#69); issue #63 is co-written by Wood and Warren Ellis, issues #64–70 are scripted by Wood from Ellis' plots, 2000–2001) collected as:
  - Counter-X Volume 2 (collects #63–70, tpb, 192 pages, 2008, ISBN 0-7851-3305-4)
  - Counter-X: Generation X — Four Days (collects #71–75, tpb, 160 pages, 2013, ISBN 0-7851-6730-7)
- Wolverine and the X-Men: Alpha and Omega #1–5 (with Mark Brooks and Roland Boschi, 2012) collected as Wolverine and the X-Men: Alpha and Omega (hc, 120 pages, 2012, ISBN 0-7851-6400-6; tpb, 2013, ISBN 0-7851-6401-4)
- X-Men (with David López, Roland Boschi (vol. 3 #34–35), Olivier Coipel (vol. 4 #1–3), Terry Dodson (vol. 4 #7–9), Kris Anka (vol. 4 #10–12), Clay Mann (vol. 4 #10–14), Philippe Briones (vol. 4 #13–15, 17) and Matteo Buffagni (vol. 4 #15–16), 2012–2014) collected as:
  - Blank Generation (collects vol. 3 #30–35, tpb, 120 pages, 2013, ISBN 0-7851-6459-6)
  - Reckless Abandonment (includes vol. 3 #36–37, tpb, 136 pages, 2013, ISBN 0-7851-6461-8)
  - Primer (collects vol. 4 #1–4, tpb, 120 pages, 2013, ISBN 0-7851-6800-1)
  - X-Men: Battle of the Atom (includes vol. 4 #5–6, hc, 248 pages, 2014, ISBN 0-7851-8906-8; tpb, 2014, ISBN 0-7851-8907-6)
    - Also collects an epilogue from X-Men: Battle of the Atom #2 (of 2) (written by Wood, art by Kris Anka, 2013)
  - Muertas (collects vol. 4 #7–12, tpb, 136 pages, 2014, ISBN 0-7851-6801-X)
  - Bloodline (collects vol. 4 #13–17, tpb, 120 pages, 2014, ISBN 0-7851-8972-6)
- Ultimate Comics: X-Men (with Paco Medina, Reilly Brown (#13–14), Carlo Barberi, Filipe Andrade (#18.1), Mahmud Asrar (#24–28) and Álvaro Martínez (#29–33); issues #21–22 are co-written by Wood and Nathan Edmondson, 2012–2013) collected as:
  - Ultimate Comics: Divided We Fall, United We Stand (includes #13–18, hc, 408 pages, 2013, ISBN 0-7851-6781-1; tpb, 2013, ISBN 0-7851-8416-3)
  - Ultimate Comics: X-Men by Brian Wood Volume 1 (collects #18.1, 19–23, tpb, 136 pages, 2013, ISBN 0-7851-6136-8)
  - Ultimate Comics: X-Men by Brian Wood Volume 2 (collects #24–28, tpb, 112 pages, 2013, ISBN 0-7851-6720-X)
  - Ultimate Comics: X-Men by Brian Wood Volume 3 (collects #29–33, tpb, 112 pages, 2014, ISBN 0-7851-6721-8)
- Moon Knight vol. 4 #7–12 (with Greg Smallwood, 2014–2015) collected as Moon Knight: Dead Will Rise (tpb, 136 pages, 2015, ISBN 0-7851-5409-4)

=== DC Comics ===
- Vertigo:
  - Transmetropolitan: I Hate It Here (one-page illustration, text by Warren Ellis, one-shot, 2000)
    - Collected in Transmetropolitan: Tales of Human Waste (tpb, 112 pages, 2004, ISBN 1-4012-0244-6)
    - Collected in Absolute Transmetropolitan Volume 1 (hc, 544 pages, 2015, ISBN 1-4012-5430-6)
  - Fight for Tomorrow #1–6 (with Denys Cowan, 2002–2003) collected as Fight for Tomorrow (tpb, 144 pages, 2008, ISBN 1-4012-1562-9)
  - DMZ (with Riccardo Burchielli, Kristian Donaldson (#11, 20, 35–36), Nathan Fox (#18–19, 27, 56), Viktor Kalvachev (#19), Danijel Žeželj (#25 and 58), Nikki Cook (#41), Ryan Kelly (#42–44, 50), Rebekah Isaacs + Jim Lee + Fábio Moon + Lee Bermejo + Philip Bond + John Paul Leon + Eduardo Risso + Dave Gibbons (#50), Andrea Mutti (#55), Cliff Chiang (#57), David Lapham (#59) and Shawn Martinbrough (#60–61), 2006–2012) collected as:
    - Book One (collects #1–12, hc, 304 pages, 2014, ISBN 1-4012-4300-2; tpb, 2016, ISBN 1-4012-6135-3)
    - Book Two (collects #13–28, hc, 416 pages, 2014, ISBN 1-4012-4765-2; tpb, 2016, ISBN 1-4012-6357-7)
    - Book Three (collects #29–44, hc, 392 pages, 2015, ISBN 1-4012-5000-9; tpb, 2017, ISBN 1-4012-6548-0)
    - Book Four (collects #45–59, hc, 384 pages, 2015, ISBN 1-4012-5411-X; tpb, 2018, ISBN 1-4012-7463-3)
    - Book Five (collects #60–72, hc, 296 pages, 2015, ISBN 1-4012-5843-3; tpb, 2019, ISBN 1-4012-8583-X)
    - Compendium One (collects #1–36, tpb, 804 pages, DC Black Label, 2020, ISBN 1-77950-435-7)
    - Compendium Two (collects #37–72, tpb, 824 pages, DC Black Label, 2021, ISBN 1-77951-482-4)
  - Northlanders (with Davide Gianfelice, Dean Ormston (#9–10), Ryan Kelly (#11–16), Vasilis Lolos (#17), Danijel Žeželj (#18–19, 48–50), Leandro Fernández (#21–28), Fiona Staples (#29), Riccardo Burchielli (#30–34), Becky Cloonan (#35–36), Simon Gane (#37–39), Matt Woodson (#40), Marian Churchland (#41), Paul Azaceta (#42–44) and Declan Shalvey (#45–47), 2008–2012) collected as:
    - The Anglo-Saxon Saga (collects #1–16, 18–19 and 41, tpb, 464 pages, 2016, ISBN 1-4012-63313)
    - The Icelandic Saga (collects #20, 29, 35–36 and 42–50, tpb, 296 pages, 2016, ISBN 1-4012-6508-1)
    - The European Saga (collects #17, 21–28, 30–34 and 37–40, tpb, 424 pages, 2017, ISBN 1-4012-7379-3)
  - Demo vol. 2 #1–6 (with Becky Cloonan, 2010) collected as Demo Volume 2 (tpb, 160 pages, 2011, ISBN 1-4012-2995-6)
    - Sequel to the 12-issue limited series of the same name published by AiT/Planet Lar between 2003 and 2004.
    - Both series were later collected by Dark Horse as Demo (tpb, 496 pages, 2015, ISBN 1-61655-682-X)
  - The Unexpected: "Americana" (with Emily Carroll, anthology one-shot, 2011) collected in The Unexpected (tpb, 160 pages, 2013, ISBN 1-4012-4394-0)
- The New York Four (tpb, 296 pages, Dark Horse, 2014, ISBN 1-61655-605-6) collects:
  - The New York Four (with Ryan Kelly, graphic novel, 176 pages, Minx, 2008, ISBN 1-4012-1154-2)
  - The New York Five #1–4 (with Ryan Kelly, Vertigo, 2010–2011) also collected as The New York Five (tpb, 144 pages, 2011, ISBN 1-4012-3291-4)
- DV8: Gods and Monsters #1–8 (with Rebekah Isaacs, Wildstorm, 2010–2011) collected as DV8: Gods and Monsters (tpb, 192 pages, 2011, ISBN 1-4012-2973-5)
- The Lord of the Rings: War in the North (with Simon Coleby, 16-page digital comic available to those who pre-ordered the eponymous video game via Toys "R" Us, 2011)
- Supernatural #1–6 (with Grant Bond, 2011–2012) collected as Supernatural: The Dogs of Edinburgh (tpb, 144 pages, 2012, ISBN 1-4012-3506-9)

=== Dark Horse Comics ===
- Conan the Barbarian vol. 3 (with Becky Cloonan (#1–3, 7), James Harren (#4–6), Vasilis Lolos (#8–9), Declan Shalvey (#10–12), Mirko Colak (#13–15), Davide Gianfelice (#16–18), Paul Azaceta (#19–21), Riccardo Burchielli (#22–24) and Leandro Fernández (#25), 2012–2014) collected as:
  - Conan: Queen of the Black Coast (collects #1–6, hc, 152 pages, 2013, ISBN 1-61655-042-2; tpb, 2013, ISBN 1-61655-043-0)
  - Conan: The Death (collects #7–12, hc, 152 pages, 2013, ISBN 1-61655-122-4; tpb, 2014, ISBN 1-61655-123-2)
  - Conan: Nightmare of the Shallows (collects #13–18, hc, 152 pages, 2014, ISBN 1-61655-233-6; tpb, 2014, ISBN 1-61655-385-5)
  - Conan: The Song of Bêlit (collects #19–25, hc, 176 pages, 2014, ISBN 1-61655-430-4; tpb, 2015, ISBN 1-61655-524-6)
  - Conan Chronicles: Horrors Beneath the Stones (includes #1–6, tpb, 432 pages, Marvel, 2020, ISBN 1-302-92327-7)
  - Conan Chronicles: The Song of Bêlit (collects #7–25, tpb, 448 pages, Marvel, 2021, ISBN 1-302-92328-5)
- The Massive:
  - The Massive (with Kristian Donaldson (#1–3), Garry Brown, Gary Erskine (#10), Declan Shalvey (#11) and Danijel Žeželj (#12, 22–24), 2012–2014) collected as:
    - Volume 1 (collects #1–15, Library Edition, hc, 392 pages, 2016, ISBN 1-5067-0091-8; Omnibus, tpb, 2019, ISBN 1-5067-1332-7)
      - Includes the prelude short stories (art by Kristian Donaldson) from Dark Horse Presents vol. 2 #8–10 (anthology, 2012)
    - Volume 2 (collects #16–30, Library Edition, hc, 392 pages, 2016, ISBN 1-5067-0092-6; Omnibus, tpb, 2019, ISBN 1-5067-1333-5)
  - The Massive: Ninth Wave #1–6 (with Garry Brown, 2015–2016) collected as The Massive: Ninth Wave (hc, 152 pages, 2016, ISBN 1-5067-0091-8; tpb, 2017, ISBN 1-5067-0009-8)
- Star Wars vol. 3 (with Carlos D'Anda, Ryan Kelly (#7–9), Facundo Percio (#13–14) and Stéphane Créty (#15–18), 2013–2014) collected as:
  - In the Shadow of Yavin (collects #1–6, tpb, 152 pages, 2013, ISBN 1-61655-170-4)
    - Includes "The Assassination of Darth Vader" short story (art by Ryan Odagawa) from the Free Comic Book Day: Avatar the Last Airbender/Star Wars one-shot (2013)
  - From the Ruins of Alderaan (collects #7–12, tpb, 144 pages, 2014, ISBN 1-61655-311-1)
  - Rebel Girl (collects #15–18, tpb, 96 pages, 2014, ISBN 1-61655-483-5)
  - A Shattered Hope (collects #13–14 and 19–20, tpb, 112 pages, 2014, ISBN 1-61655-483-5)
  - Star Wars Legends: The Rebellion Volume 1 (includes #1–12, tpb, 504 pages, Marvel, 2016, ISBN 0-7851-9546-7)
  - Star Wars Legends: The Rebellion Volume 2 (includes #13–20, tpb, 488 pages, Marvel, 2017, ISBN 1-302-90696-8)
- Rebels:
  - Rebels #1–10 (with Andrea Mutti, Matt Woodson (#7), Ariela Kristantina (#8) and Tristan Jones (#10), 2015–2016) collected as Rebels: A Well-Regulated Militia (tpb, 262 pages, 2016, ISBN 1-61655-908-X)
  - Rebels: These Free and Independent States #1–8 (with Andrea Mutti, Luca Casalanguida (#7) and Joan Urgell (#8), 2017) collected as Rebels: These Free and Independent States (tpb, 208 pages, 2018, ISBN 1-5067-0203-1)
- Eve: Valkyrie #1–4 (with Eduardo Francisco, 2015–2016) collected as Eve: Valkyrie (hc, 96 pages, 2016, ISBN 1-61655-767-2)
- Aliens:
  - Aliens: Defiance (with Tristan Jones, Riccardo Burchielli (#3), Tony Brescini (#4, 8–9), Stephen Thompson (#7 and 10) and Eduardo Francisco (#11–12), 2016–2017) collected as:
    - Volume 1 (collects #1–6 and the Free Comic Book Day 2016: Serenity special, tpb, 160 pages, 2017, ISBN 1-5067-0126-4)
    - Volume 2 (collects #7–12, tpb, 160 pages, 2017, ISBN 1-5067-0168-X)
    - Library Edition (collects #1–12 and the Free Comic Book Day 2016: Serenity special, hc, 320 pages, 2019, ISBN 1-5067-1458-7)
  - Aliens: Resistance #1–4 (with Robert Carey, 2019) collected as Aliens: Resistance (tpb, 96 pages, 2018, ISBN 1-5067-1126-X)
  - Aliens: Rescue #1–4 (with Kieran McKeown, 2019) collected as Aliens: Rescue (tpb, 96 pages, 2020, ISBN 1-5067-1127-8)
  - Aliens: Colonial Marines — Rising Threat (with Werther Dell'Edera, 8-issue limited series — initially announced for 2019)
    - Four issues were solicited before the series was cancelled due to the allegations of sexual misconduct against Wood.
- Briggs Land:
  - Briggs Land #1–6 (with Mack Chater, 2016–2017) collected as Briggs Land: State of Grace (tpb, 160 pages, 2017, ISBN 1-5067-0059-4)
  - Briggs Land: Lone Wolves (tpb, 160 pages, 2017, ISBN 1-5067-0168-X) collects:
    - Briggs Land: Lone Wolves #1–6 (with Mack Chater, Vanesa del Rey (#4) and Werther Dell'Edera (#5–6), 2017)
    - Free Comic Book Day: Avatar: "The Village" (with Werther Dell'Edera, co-feature in one-shot, 2017)
- Sword Daughter (with Mack Chater, 2018–2020) collected as:
  - She Brightly Burns (collects #1–3, hc, 96 pages, 2018, ISBN 1-5067-0782-3)
  - Folded Metal (collects #4–6, hc, 96 pages, 2019, ISBN 1-5067-0783-1)
  - Elsbeth of the Island (collects #7–9, hc, 96 pages, 2020, ISBN 1-5067-0784-X)
- The Terminator: Sector War #1–4 (with Jeff Stokely, 2018–2019) collected as The Terminator: Sector War (tpb, 104 pages, 2019, ISBN 1-5067-0681-9)

=== Other publishers ===
- Oni Press:
  - Pounded #1–3 (with Steve Rolston, 2002) collected as Pounded (tpb, 96 pages, 2002, ISBN 1-929998-37-6)
  - Local #1–12 (with Ryan Kelly, 2005–2008) collected as Local (hc, 384 pages, 2008, ISBN 1-934964-00-X)
- Vampirella (Harris):
  - Vampirella/Witchblade (with Steve Pugh, one-shot, 2003) collected in Vampirella/Witchblade Trilogy (tpb, 88 pages, 2006, ISBN 0-910692-90-4)
  - Vampirella Comics Magazine #8: "Kickstart My Heart" (with Dean Haspiel, anthology, 2004)
- Project: Superior: "The Watcher" (script and art, anthology graphic novel, 288 pages, AdHouse Books, 2005, ISBN 0-9721794-8-8)
- Supermarket #1–4 (with Kristian Donaldson, IDW Publishing, 2006) collected as Supermarket (tpb, 104 pages, 2006, ISBN 1-60010-009-0)
- Decoy: Menagerie Volume 2: "Magic Bullets" (with Martin Montiel Luna, anthology graphic novel, 162 pages, Penny-Farthing Press, 2006, ISBN 0-9719012-7-9)
- Dogs Day End (with Nikki Cook, unreleased graphic novel intended for publication by Top Shelf — initially announced for 2008, ISBN 1-891830-59-7)
  - An excerpt from this story was published in Top Shelf 2008 Seasonal Sampler (anthology graphic novel, 256 pages, 2008, ISBN 1-60309-032-0)
- Madefire (digital/motion comics):
  - Mono: Pacific #1–2 (with Sergio Sandoval, 2014)
    - The story was first published in print as Mono: Pacific #1–2 (Titan, 2015)
    - Collected in Mono (hc, 192 pages, Titan, 2015, ISBN 1-78276-285-X)
  - Planet of the Apes: Memorial (with Daniel Sampere, 5-page mini-comic, 2016)
- Rome West #1–12 (co-written by Wood and Justin Giampaoli, art by Andrea Mutti, webcomic, Stela, 2016) collected as Rome West (tpb, 112 pages, Dark Horse, 2018, ISBN 1-5067-0499-9)
- John Carter: The End #1–5 (co-written by Wood and Alex Cox, art by Hayden Sherman, Dynamite, 2017) collected as John Carter: The End (tpb, 120 pages, 2017, ISBN 1-5241-0438-8)
- Robotech vol. 3 (with Marco Turini; issues #5–8 are scripted by Simon Furman from Wood's plots, Titan, 2017–2008) collected as:
  - Volume 1 (collects #1–4, tpb, 112 pages, 2017, ISBN 1-78585-913-7)
  - Volume 2 (collects #5–8, tpb, 112 pages, 2018, ISBN 1-78585-914-5)
- RoboCop: Citizens Arrest #1–4 (with Jorge Coelho, Boom! Studios, 2018) collected as RoboCop: Citizens Arrest (tpb, 128 pages, 2018, ISBN 1-68415-270-4)
- Megadeth: Death by Design: "Kingmaker" (with Marco Perugini, anthology graphic novel, 350 pages, Heavy Metal Media, 2019, ISBN 1-947784-12-9)

=== Cover illustrations ===
- Come In Alone sc (AiT/PlanetLar, 2001)
- Overtime gn (Cyberosia Publishing, 2002)
- Badlands (with Vince Giarrano, AiT/PlanetLar):
  - Badlands tpb (2002)
  - Badlands: The Unproduced Screenplay sc (2002)
- Black Heart Billy tpb (AiT/PlanetLar, 2002)
- Nobody tpb (AiT/PlanetLar, 2002)
- Global Frequency (Wildstorm):
  - Global Frequency #1–12 (2002–2004)
  - Global Frequency: Planet Ablaze tpb (2004)
  - Global Frequency: Detonation Radio tpb (2004)
- Human Target vol. 3 #4 (DC Comics, 2010)

Preceded by Jay Faerber	Generation X writer 2000–2001 (with Warren Ellis in 2000)	Succeeded by Christina Strain
Preceded by Roland J. Green	Conan the Barbarian writer 2012–2014	Succeeded by Jason Aaron
Preceded by Victor Gischler	X-Men writer 2012–2014	Succeeded by Marc Guggenheim
Preceded by Nick Spencer	Ultimate Comics: X-Men writer 2012–2013	Succeeded by n/a
Preceded by John Ostrander; Jan Duursema	Star Wars writer 2013–2014	Succeeded by Jason Aaron
Preceded by Warren Ellis	Moon Knight writer 2014–2015	Succeeded by Cullen Bunn
