= Rob G. =

American comics artist (born 1973)

- Born: Rob Goodridge; December 4, 1973 (age 52) Newport News, Virginia
- Areas: Penciller, Inker, Colourist
- Notable works: Teenagers from Mars; The Couriers

Rob G (born December 4, 1973) is an American comics artist who has done work for DC Comics, Image Comics, and AiT/Planet Lar, and is best known for Teenagers from Mars and The Couriers.

== Biography ==
Rob G. studied art at Virginia Commonwealth University in Richmond, Virginia, until late 1997 when he moved to New York City and began self-publishing Teenagers from Mars with Rick Spears after self-publishing their second graphic novel Dead West, the pair published the comic series Repo with Image Comics.

He lives in Portland, Oregon, with his wife and daughter.

== Bibliography ==
Comics work includes:

- Teenagers from Mars (with Rick Spears, 8-issue limited series, self-published, 2001–2003, tpb, 272 pages, Gigantic Graphic Novels, February 2005, ISBN 0-9763038-0-9)
- The Couriers (with Brian Wood, graphic novel series, AiT/Planet Lar):
  - The Couriers (88 pages, March 2003, ISBN 1-932051-06-6)
  - Dirtbike Manifesto (88 pages, February 2004, ISBN 1-932051-18-X)
  - The Ballad of Johnny Funwrecker (88 pages, February 2005, ISBN 1-932051-31-7)
- Detective Comics 785-788 (with Rick Spears, DC Comics, October 2003 - January 2004)
- "Call To Arms: The Ballad of Archibald Copperpot: Act 3 - Scene 5" (with Rick Spears, in Metal Hurlant magazine #12, Humanoids Publishing, June/July 2004)
- Dead West (with Rick Spears, graphic novel, 144 pages, Gigantic Graphic Novels, August 2005, ISBN 0-9763038-1-7)
- Filler (with Rick Spears, graphic novel, 96 pages, AiT/Planet Lar, April 2005, ISBN 1-932051-32-5)
- "The State I Am In" (with Rick Spears, in Put the Book Back on the Shelf: A Belle and Sebastian Anthology, anthology graphic novel, Image Comics, March 2006, ISBN 978-1-58240-600-8)
- Repo (with Rick Spears, 5-issue limited series, Image Comics, June–December 2007, tpb, 152 pages, March 2008, ISBN 1-58240-874-2)
- "Operation Torch" (with Rick Spears, in Postcards: True Stories That Never Happened, anthology hardcover graphic novel, 160 pages, Villard Books, July 2007, ISBN 0-345-49850-X)
