= Local (comics) =

- Cover of Local #8.

Publication information
- Publisher: Oni Press
- Schedule: Monthly
- Format: Limited series
- Publication date: November 2005 – June 2008
- No. of issues: 12
- Main character: Megan

Creative team
- Created by: Brian Wood
- Written by: Brian Wood
- Artist: Ryan Kelly

Local is a twelve-part Oni Press comic book limited series written by Brian Wood and illustrated by Ryan Kelly.

Each issue is intended to be a stand-alone short story, taking place in a different town across North America. A recurring character, Megan, provides a thread for readers who follow the series in sequence. Megan is the main character in some issues, while in others she is a spectator or background figure.

Local resembles a previous series of Wood's, Demo (published by AiT/Planet Lar), which also spanned twelve issues, each of which was a self-contained story. As Local went on, it became more of a coming of age story for the lead character.

The first issue was released in November 2005, and the series concluded in June 2008.

== Issues ==
1. "Ten Thousand Thoughts Per Second" - Portland, Oregon
2. "Polaroid Boyfriend" - Minneapolis, Minnesota
3. "Theories and Defenses" - Richmond, Virginia
4. "Two Brothers" - Missoula, Montana
5. "The Last 10 Lonely Days at the Oxford Theatre" - Halifax, Nova Scotia
6. "Megan and Gloria, Apartment 5A" - Brooklyn, New York
7. "Hazardous Youth" - Tempe, Arizona
8. "Food as Substitute" - Wicker Park, Chicago
9. "Wish You Were Here" - Norman, Oklahoma
10. "Bar Crawl" - Austin, Texas
11. "The Younger Generation" - Toronto, Ontario
12. "The House That Megan Built" - Vermont
