= John Doe (comics) =

Publication information
- Publisher: Eura Editoriale
- First appearance: John Doe Dossier #1 (supplement to Lanciostory #39)
- Created by: Lorenzo Bartoli; Roberto Recchioni

In-story information
- Team affiliations: Knights of the Apocalypse
- Abilities: Born human, from #24 he became the incarnation of Death, virtually immortal, invincible,
John Doe
Publication information
- Format: ongoing
- Genre: Action/Romance
Creative team
- Written by: Lorenzo Bartoli and Roberto Recchioni
- Artist(s): Alessio Fortunato, Marco Farinelli, Walter Venturi, Riccardo Burchielli, Maurizio Rosenzweig, Werther Dell'Edera

John Doe is an Italian comic book by Roberto Recchioni and Lorenzo Bartoli, published by Eura Editoriale. Graphically, it was created by Massimo Carnevale, who is also the current cover artist. Artists who worked for the series include Alessio Fortunato, Marco Farinelli, Walter Venturi and Riccardo Burchielli.

John Doe is an employee of "Trapassati Inc.", a firm dealing with the management of death. His direct superior is Death herself, portrayed as a very beautiful and sarcastic woman. Doe has a relationship with Tempo (which is the Italian word for "Time"), who is in fact an incarnation of time itself. In his missions, he is helped by several characters, some also employees of Trapassati Inc., other coming from the "Regno" (Italian word for "Kingdom"), a place out of space and time where figures such as War, Famine and Pestilence live.
