= Sky Ape =

Comics character

Publication information
- Publisher: Slave Labor Graphics, then AiT/PlanetLar
- Schedule: intermittent
- Format: trade paperback
- Publication date: Sky Ape: February 2001; Sky Ape: Waiting for Crime: August 2002; Sky Ape: All the Heroes: February 2003; Sky Ape: King of Girls: 2005
- Main character: Kirk Madge aka Sky Ape

Creative team
- Created by: Phil Amara, Mike Russo, Richard Jenkins and Tim McCarney

Sky Ape is the title character of a black-and-white comic book series. He is an ape who wears a jetpack and fights crime.

== History ==
Sky Ape was created by boyhood friends from different neighborhoods in the Boston, Massachusetts area. Phil Amara and Michael Russo were from East Boston, while Tim McCarney was from West Roxbury. They wanted to do a story about a gorilla with a jetpack that would rather do peoples taxes than fight crime. An artist search began, and eventually ended with Oklahoma-native Richard Jenkins. Jenkins has been the artist and co-creator on the series from the first published page to the last (with guest artists Shannon Gallant and Paul Corrigan helping Jenkins for only one stint).

The series was first published by Slave Labor Graphics and publisher Dan Vado. The series lasted four issues under SLG (including a trade paperback edition). After languishing for several months without a publisher, Sky Ape was picked up by Larry Young and AiT/PlanetLar publishing. AiT first re-published the original SLG series is one squarebound collection with a cover design by graphic designer Amy Arendts. Next, in 2001, AiT published a second paperback entitled Sky Ape: Waiting for Crime. In 2003, a third volume called Sky Ape: All the Heroes followed. The creators then became overworked with side projects and parted ways. They rejoined in 2005 for a final saddlestitched one-shot called Sky Ape: King of Girls. Each Sky Ape comic has also included guest art by comic creators such as Alex Maleev, Craig Thompson, Pop Mhan, Mark Martin, Ben Stenbeck, Jack Pollock, Mark Schultz, Guy Davis, and many others.

== Style ==
The humor in Sky Ape is reminiscent of the old Adam West Batman (TV series) and The Monkees TV series. But the major influence is Monty Python's Flying Circus, as evidenced by the onslaught of nonsequiturs in the book. The series heavily uses media references as part of its gags. The collection garnered praise from Entertainment Weekly. Sky Ape has also become discussed on blog sites, using phrases like "Suck factor is high!" becoming somewhat of a minor mantra.

The property is currently in development in Hollywood by Kickstart Entertainment as television animation.
