= Astronauts in Trouble =

Comic book series

Astronauts in Trouble is the title of a series of comic books and graphic novels created by Larry Young.

Charlie Adlard is the artist for the bulk of the stories, with Matthew Dow Smith providing the artwork for early chapters, and Kieron Dwyer, Steven Weissman, Darick Robertson, Brian Wood, Scott Johnson, John Heebink, and Matt Hollingsworth contributing.

Astronauts in Trouble is also the AiT in publisher name AiT/Planet Lar.

== Plot ==
=== Astronauts in Trouble: Live From the Moon ===
The first story arc is set in 2019, 50 years after the first Moon landing. Eccentric millionaire Ishmael Hayes has decided to launch his own mission to return to the Moon, and claim it as his own property. To ensure that he receives the right amount of publicity, Hayes brings along the Channel 7 news crew to film the mission. Along the way Hayes must deal with eco-terrorists, and a nuclear bomb wielding Mafia.

The stories originally appeared in the five issue limited series Astronauts in Trouble: Live From the Moon (March - July 1999), and published by Gun Dog Comics. They were reprinted in the 1999 trade paperback Astronauts in Trouble: Live From the Moon (ISBN 978-0967684710).

=== Astronauts in Trouble: One Shot, One Beer ===
Astronauts in Trouble: One Shot, One Beer (ISBN 978-0967684758) is an original graphic novel published in trade paperback form in 2000. Ten years after the events of Live From the Moon, the Moon is the home to Cool Ed's, the only bar for 240,000 miles. Prospectors, settlers, and others gather there to tell stories and swap lies.

=== Astronauts in Trouble: Space: 1959 ===
In 1959, Colonel Lloyd Macadam's top-secret Moon-shot program in Peru is discovered when the Channel Seven news team investigates the death of a janitor. The space launch is put into jeopardy when a Russian spy commandeers the rocket and Colonel Macadam must choose between his country and his life.

The story originally appeared in the three issue limited series Astronauts in Trouble: Space: 1959 (January - March 2000). They were collected in the 2000 trade paperback Astronauts in Trouble: Space: 1959 (ISBN 978-0967684734).

=== Astronauts in Trouble: Master Flight Plan ===
This is an omnibus edition published in 2003 (ISBN 978-1932051124) containing Live From the Moon, One Shot, One Beer, Space: 1959, and the one-shot Astronauts in Trouble: Cool Ed's, originally published in September 1999.

=== The Making of Astronauts in Trouble ===
This book (ISBN 978-0967684703) is not part of the series, but is instead a behind the scenes look at the development of the title. The book covers the original development of the series, and includes preliminary sketches, draft scripts, and a preview comic published before the first issue.
