= Gavin Spielman =

- Born: July 24, 1972 (age 54); Bethpage, Nassau County, Long Island, New York
- Known for: Painter, musician, teacher
- Movement: Contemporary realism
- Awards: Salmagundi Club 3x

Gavin Spielman (born July 24, 1972) is an American landscape painter and guitarist working in New York City, New York. He has been mentioned in the Bold Face Names section of The New York Times alongside Annie Leibovitz, Newsday, the Daily News, and many other publications. The Baltimore Sun quoted Gavin saying 'I paint the silent thoughts other people cannot express'. He has been teaching painting and drawing at Parsons The New School for Design since 1999 and is represented by several prominent galleries in the U.S. He has collaborated with the author Brian Wood on several comics and found a career in illustration, before committing to a career in Fine Art (Oil Painting). Spielman has received many awards for his landscape painting, most notably from the Salmagundi Club in New York City. He is a member of both the Salmagundi Club and the National Arts Club. Spielman's work is in countless private collections throughout the world.

Spielman is also a skilled guitar and bass player, and has played with many outfits including Winston Grennan, the inventor of the one drop rhythm which dominates reggae to this day. His current band is called Thinning the Herd, which he plays guitar and writes for. Thinning the Herd (TTH) has been likened to The Velvet Underground, MC5 and Iggy Pop by Guitar Player magazine. TTH has two records available through iTunes entitled Devil Mask - released in 2009 and Oceans Rise (2011). Spielman is currently living in Chinatown, Manhattan with his wife Alison and their daughter.

== Sources ==
- The New York Times, "Drive By Commission" Bold Face Names, May 1, 2002 by James Barron
- The Cape Cod Times, "Timeless paintings in key of life" by contributing writer André van der Wende, Friday, April 8 (year?)
- Guitar Player Magazine, "Editor's Top Eight Myspace Picks," November 2007 by Michael Molenda
