= The Tourist (comics) =

2006 graphic novel by Brian Wood and Toby Cypress

Publication information
- Publisher: Image Comics
- Publication date: April 5, 2006

Creative team
- Written by: Brian Wood
- Artist: Toby Cypress

The Tourist is a graphic novel written by Brian Wood, with art by Toby Cypress, published by Image Comics. The book, consisting of 104 pages in black and white, came out on April 5, 2006.
