= The Couriers =

Comic book series

- Created by: Brian Wood; Rob G.

Publication information
- Publisher: AiT/Planet Lar
- Schedule: Yearly
- Title(s): The Couriers; Dirtbike Manifesto; The Ballad of Johnny Funwrecker
- Formats: Original material for the series has been published as a set of graphic novels.
- Genre: Science fiction
- Publication date: 2003–2005
- Number of issues: 3
- Main character(s): Special; Moustafa; Johnny Funwrecker

Creative team
- Writer(s): Brian Wood
- Artist(s): Rob G.
- Letterer(s): Ryan Yount
- Editor(s): Larry Young

The Couriers is a series of graphic novels created and written by Brian Wood and illustrated by Rob G. and published by AiT/Planet Lar.

== Publication history ==
Woods has discussed a fourth volume, saying, in mid-2009:

Rob G and I have an agreement that should The Couriers film ever go into production, we'd be fools not to do a sequel. We've read the film script and it's good, but still no director has been attached, so I think it's a way's off.

== Plot ==
The story depicts the near-future world of New York City where two gun toting couriers deliver questionable goods by questionable means. Very heavily influenced by the Hong Kong style of cinema and Japanese manga style comics, The Couriers is an action driven graphic novel that returns the artform of comic books to its pulp/action oriented stories, albeit with an updated modern feel.

== Connections with other comics ==
Some of the characters first appeared in the Couscous Express. It is also a part of Wood's Channel Zero universe as Jennie 2.5 showed up in the last chapter of the first trade.

== Books ==
The series comprises:

- The Couriers (88 pages, March 2003, ISBN 1-932051-06-6)
- Dirtbike Manifesto (88 pages, February 2004, ISBN 1-932051-18-X)
- The Ballad of Johnny Funwrecker (88 pages, February 2005, ISBN 1-932051-31-7)

== Film ==
It was announced in 2007 that Intrepid Pictures has picked up the option to make a film based on the series, with Javier Grillo-Marxuach pencilled in to write the screenplay.
