= Put the Book Back on the Shelf =

- Cover.

Publication information
- Publisher: Image Comics
- Format: Single-volume anthology
- Publication date: 8 March 2006
- Editor(s): Eric Stephenson

Collected editions
- Paperback: ISBN 978-1-58240-600-8

Put the Book Back on the Shelf: A Belle & Sebastian Anthology is an anthology comic book published by Image Comics. The book features 24 comics by various writers and artists based on songs by the Scottish indie pop band Belle & Sebastian. It was released on 8 March 2006.

The title of the book comes from a track on the EP 3.. 6.. 9 Seconds of Light.

== Stories ==
=== "The State I Am In" ===
Writer: Rick Spears

Artist: Rob G.

=== "Expectations" ===
Writer: Christopher Butcher

Artist: Kalman Andrasofszky

Colorist: Ramon Perez

=== "I Could Be Dreaming" ===
Writer and artist: Andi Watson

=== "We Rule the School" ===
Writer: Mark Andrew Smith

Artist: Paul Maybury

=== "Me and the Major" ===
Writer and artist: Tom Hart

=== "Fox in the Snow" ===
Writer and artist: Jacob Magraw

=== "Get Me Away from Here I'm Dying" ===
Writer and artist: Catia Chien

=== "Dog on Wheels" ===
Writer and artist: Kako

=== "Lazy Line Painter Jane" ===
Writer: Janet Harvey

Artist: Laurenn McCubbin

Letterer: Tristan Crane

=== "You Made Me Forget My Dreams" ===
Writer and artist: Matthew S. Armstrong

=== "Beautiful" ===
Writer: Charles Brownstein

Artist: Dave Crosland

=== "Ease Your Feet into the Sea" ===
Writer and artist: Bruno D'Angelo

=== "Fancy Dress" ===
Writer: Jennifer de Guzman

Artist: Brian Belew

Inspired by the Belle and Sebastian song "The Model".

=== "The Chalet Line" ===
Writer: Erin Laing

Artist: Matthew Forsythe

=== "Nice Day For a Sulk" ===
Writer: Rick Remender

Artist: John Heebink

=== "Too Much Love" ===
Writer and artist: Leela Corman

=== "Legal Man" ===
Writer and artist: Joey Weiser

=== "Marx and Engels" ===
Writer: Jamie S. Rich

Artist: Marc Ellerby

=== "Step into My Office, Baby!" ===
Writer: Ian Carney

Artist: Jonathan Edwards

=== "Dear Catastrophe Waitress" ===
Writer: Mark Scott Ricketts

Artist: Leanne Buckley

=== "Piazza, New York Catcher" ===
Writer and artist: David Lasky

=== "If She Wants Me" ===
Writer: Ande J. Parks

Artist: Chris Samnee

Letterer: Thomas F. Zahler

=== "Asleep on a Sunbeam" ===
Writer and artist: Nicholas Bannister

Colorist: Corentin Jaffré

=== "If You Find Yourself Caught in Love" ===
Writer and artist: Steven Griffin

== See also ==
- Comic Book Tattoo
