= Switchblade Honey =

2003 graphic novel

- Cover of Switchblade Honey TPB.
- Date: July 2003
- Publisher: AiT/Planet Lar

Creative team
- Writers: Warren Ellis
- Pencillers: Brandon McKinney

Original publication
- Issues: 1
- Language: English
- ISBN: 1932051139

Switchblade Honey is a 2003 72-page science fiction graphic novel written by Warren Ellis and drawn by Brandon McKinney, published by AiT/Planet Lar.

== Overview ==
Ellis got the idea for Switchblade Honey while watching Star Trek: Voyager, and commenting on how he preferred Patrick Stewart to Kate Mulgrew. He then had an entertaining thought:

"They should get Ray Winstone as captain."

He realized that modern TV science fiction tended to whitewash its characters, and using the actor as the archetype, came up with a foul-mouthed, chain-smoking, hard-drinking starship captain – John Ryder. McKinney agreed to draw the book, and the result was Switchblade Honey.

== Plot ==
In the 23rd century, humanity is a multi-stellar nation embroiled in a hopeless war with the Chasta, an advanced species. John Ryder, an abrasive yet brilliant and noble starship captain, faces execution for refusing to destroy an ally starship as part of an involuntary kamikaze tactic. He has been given a chance to put his skills to use one last time, by leading a Dirty Dozen-like crew in a long-term guerrilla war against the Chasta.
