= Black Road =

Comic book series

Publication information
- Publisher: Image Comics
- Schedule: Monthly
- Format: Ongoing series
- Genre: Viking
- Publication date: April 2016
- No. of issues: 10
- Main character: Magnus the Black

Creative team
- Created by: Brian Wood Garry Brown
- Written by: Brian Wood
- Penciller: Garry Brown
- Letterer: Steve Wands
- Colorist: Dave McCaig

Black Road is a Viking comic book series written by Brian Wood and published by Image Comics, with art by Garry Brown. Set during the Viking Age in Norway, it follows the story of the main character, Magnus the Black.
