= Riccardo Burchielli =

Italian artist

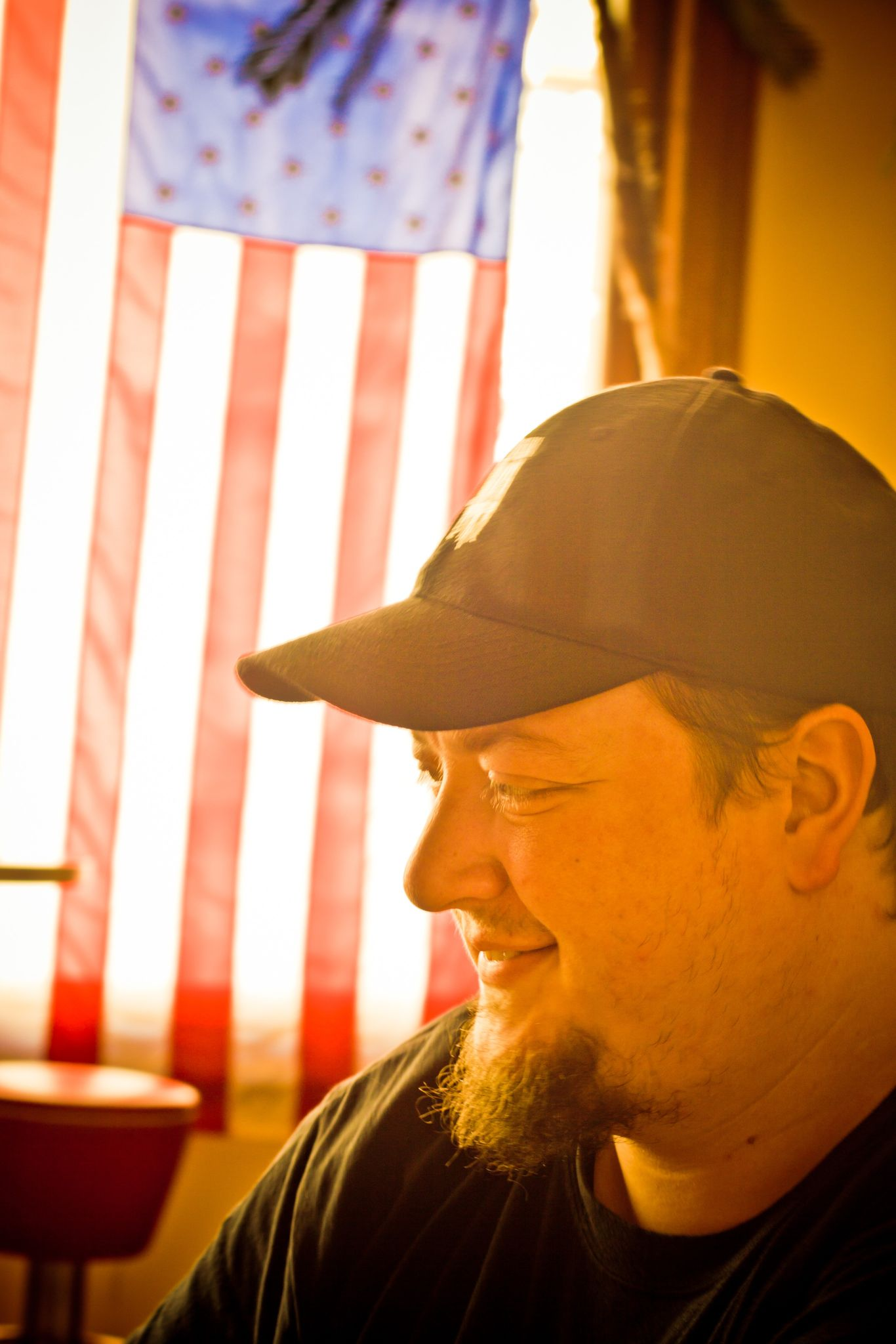
- Born: February 25, 1975 (age 51) Peccioli, Italy

Riccardo Burchielli (born 27 February 1975) is an Italian artist known for his work on the DC/Vertigo comic book series DMZ, his first work in the United States.

== Early life ==
Burchielli was born in Peccioli, near Pisa, Tuscany.

== Career ==
Burchielli began his career in 1997, with a story of Desdy Metus and later he worked for Ediperiodici. From 2003, he illustrated three stories for John Doe. In 2005 he co-created DMZ with writer Brian Wood. The series was published under DC Comics' Vertigo label.

After DMZ, he drew Batman, Conan and Avengers. In 2010, he was among the founding members of Italian Job Studio, a creative collective active in the television and cross-media production field. In the same year his works were exhibited at the Cité dell'Architecture in Paris as part of the Exhibition Archi & BD. In 2014 he worked on Highway To Hell, a horror miniseries, written by Victor Gischler and Boosta. While collaborating with Sergio Bonelli Editore on Dylan Dog, he performed work for Ferrari and BMW Motorrad. and as a character designer for cinema and video games. In 2021, DMZ became a TV series directed by Ava DuVernay for the American platform HBO Max.
