= Supermarket (comics) =

- Cover of the third issue of Supermarket, 2006.

Publication information
- Publisher: IDW Publishing
- Format: Mini-series
- Publication date: 2006
- No. of issues: 4
- Main character(s): Pella Susiki, Beta Nakatari

Creative team
- Written by: Brian Wood
- Artist(s): Kristian Donaldson

Supermarket is a four-issue comic book mini-series written by Brian Wood and illustrated by Kristian Donaldson. It was published by IDW Publishing in 2006.

== Story ==
In the future world of Supermarket, "Cash Rules Everything Around Me" is the literal truth. Legitimate and black-market economies rule the City, overseen by the vying factions of the Yakuza and Porno Swede crime families. Convenience store clerk and 16-year-old suburban wise-ass Pella Suzuki suddenly finds herself in the middle of it all, heir to an empire she could not possibly inherit, but hitmen on both sides are not taking any chances. Supermarket is anti-consumerism with some violence and humor.

== Issues ==
1. Released February 2006.
2. Released March 22, 2006.
3. Released May or June 2006.
4. Released September 2006.

The series was reprinted in the March 2014 collection Mean Streets.
