= Kristian Donaldson =

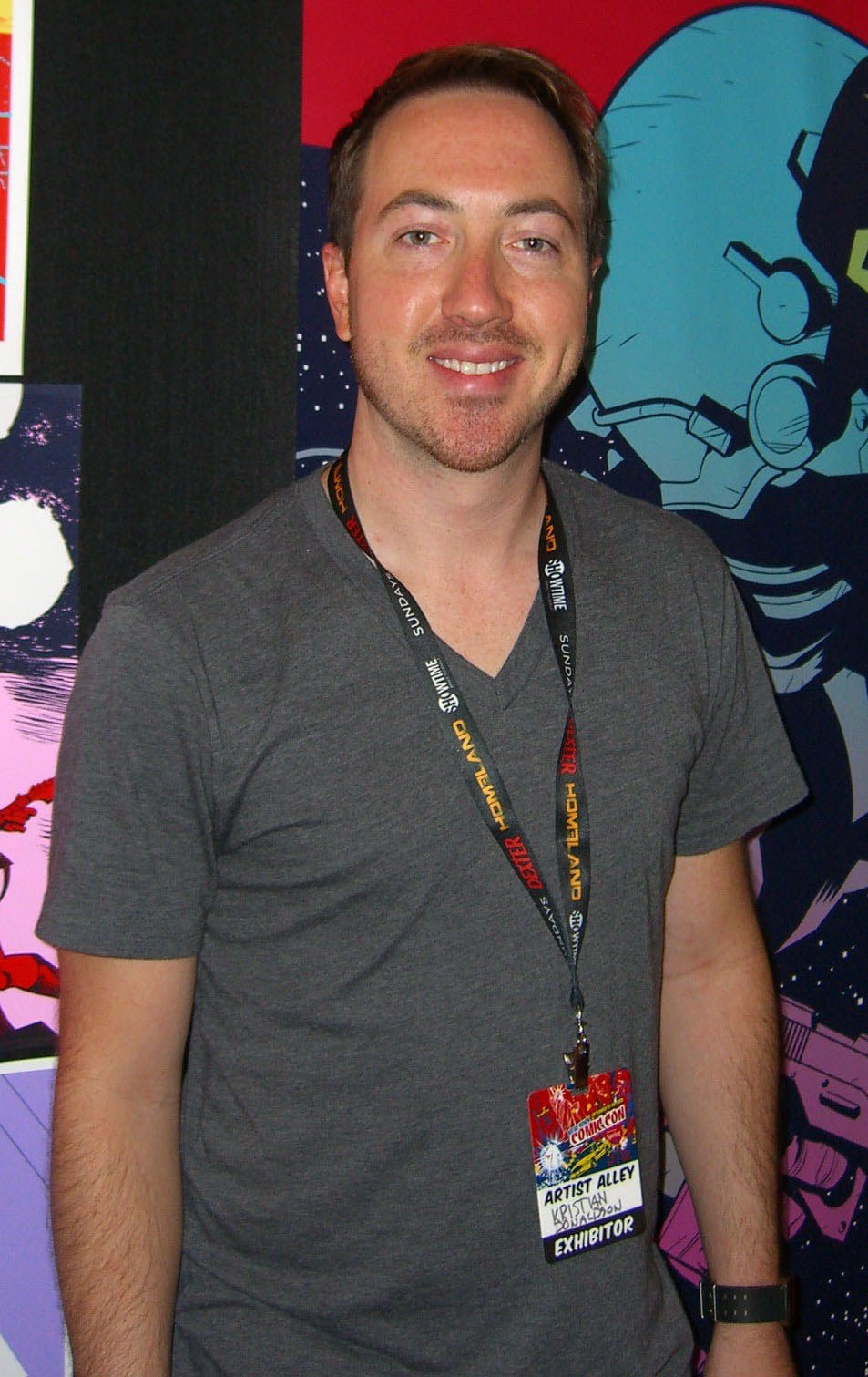
- Donaldson at the 2011 New York Comic Con.
- Notable works: Chuck; Dr. Horrible; 99 Days "Supermarket" "The Massive"

Kristian Donaldson sometimes simply credited as Kristian, is a comic book artist based in Dallas, Texas.

== Early life ==
Donaldson attended the Savannah College of Art and Design.

== Career ==
Donaldson has been working in comics since 2004. Notable works include Supermarket from IDW, and 99 Days from Vertigo. He created The Massive series with writer Brian Wood for Dark Horse.

Donaldson has done covers for comic book adaptations and tie-ins to Chuck and Dr. Horrible, and "The Guild".

== Bibliography ==
- 99 Days 2011. pencils, inks, colors. Vertigo Crime line.
- Supermarket 2006 miniseries
- DMZ #11, #20, #35, #36. 2006 - 2008. DC/Vertigo Comics
- The Guild 2011 Dark Horse Comics
- Myspace Dark Horse Presents v.4. 2009. cover. Dark Horse Comics
- Dr. Horrible - 2009. covers for mini series. Dark Horse Comics
- Forsaken 2004 miniseries. Image Comics
- Doomed 2005 anthology piece. IDW Publishing
- Amazing Fantasy #15 2005 Marvel Comics
- Fallen Angel #15 and #16. IDW Publishing
- Two Guns 2007. miniseries. covers. BOOM! Studios
- Unthinkable #1 2009. cover. BOOM! Studios
- Chuck 2008. 6-issue miniseries. covers. DC/Wildstorm
- The Goon 2009. anthology piece in Myspace Dark Horse presents v.4.
- PVP: Awesomeology collaborative cover illustration/slipcase design with series creator Scott Kurtz. Image Comics
