= Channel Zero (comics) =

Graphic novel by Brian Wood and Becky Cloonan

- Page count: 144 (2000 edition) pages
- Publisher: Image Comics; AiT/Planet Lar

Creative team
- Writers: Brian Wood
- Artists: Brian Wood

Original publication
- Date of publication: 1997 (serial), 2000 (collected), 2012
- ISBN: 0967684749

Channel Zero is a graphic novel by Brian Wood and Becky Cloonan set in a near-future New York City.

The character Jennie 2.5 also appears in Wood's The Couriers.

== Publication history ==
Channel Zero was first published by Image Comics in 1997 as a serial before being collected as a standalone work by AiT/Planet Lar in 2000. In 2002, Public Domain: A Channel Zero design book was released, and a sequel, Channel Zero: Jennie One, appeared a year later. The book is currently published by Dark Horse Comics in omnibus format.

== Synopsis ==
Channel Zero is set in a dystopian near-future New York City where the tenets of then-Mayor Rudy Giuliani have grown into a freedom-restricting government initiative called "The Clean Act". The protagonist is Jennie 2.5, a DIY media personality who sets out to stir the complacent population into revolution.

== Reception ==
Matthew Shaer of The Village Voice described the work as reminiscent of William Gibson, while Keith Giles of Comic Book Resources declared that the novel "established [Wood] early on as a talented artist and writer to keep an eye on".
