= AiT/Planet Lar =

American comic book publisher

- Founded: 1999
- Founder: Larry Young; Mimi Rosenheim
- Defunct: 2016
- Country of origin: United States
- Headquarters location: San Francisco, California
- Distribution: Diamond Book Distributors
- Publication types: Comics
- Official website: ait-planetlar.com

AiT/Planet Lar is an American comic book publishing company based in San Francisco, California. It was founded in 1999 by Larry Young and Mimi Rosenheim. The company focuses on releasing original graphic novels into the mass market, although the company has published trade paperbacks of serialized mini-series originally published by other companies.

The California Secretary of State lists AIT/PLANET LAR LLC (200636410115) "defunct" with an inactive date of December 7, 2016.

== Graphic novels ==
All titles below are original graphic novels, unless otherwise stated.

=== Action/Adventure ===
- Aces: Curse of the Red Baron
- Astronauts in Trouble (originally serialized by Gun Dog Comics)
- The Annotated Mantooth! (originally serialized by Funk-O-Tron)
- Bad Mojo
- Black Diamond
- Black Heart Billy (originally serialized by Slave Labor Graphics)
- Channel Zero (original mini-series serialized by Image Comics)
- Channel Zero: Jennie One
- Codeflesh (originally serialized by Image Comics and Funk-O-Tron)
- Continuity
- The Couriers
- Doll and Creature
- Filler
- Full Moon Fever
- Giant Robot Warriors
- Johnny Dynamite (originally serialized by Dark Horse Comics)
- Last of the Independents
- Nobody (originally serialized by Oni Press)
- Planet of the Capes
- Proof of Concept
- Scurvy Dogs
- Shatter (originally serialized by First Comics)
- Sky Ape (originally serialized by Slave Labor Graphics)
- Smoke and Guns
- Switchblade Honey
- White Death

=== All-ages ===
- Colonia
- Electric Girl
- Jax Epoch and the Quicken Forbidden
- Ursula

=== Historical fiction ===
- Abel
- Badlands
- Dugout
- Holmes (by Omaha Perez, 104 pages, March 2008, ISBN 1-932051-51-1)
- Seven Sons (by Alexander Grecian and Riley Rossmo, 88 pages, 2006, ISBN 1-932051-46-5)
- White Death (by Robbie Morrison and Charlie Adlard, 96 pages, 2002, ISBN 0-9709360-6-0)

=== Epics ===
- Demo (by Brian Wood and Becky Cloonan)
- Footsoldiers
- Hench
- Planet of the Capes
- Rock Bottom
- Sunset City
- True Story, Swear to God: Chances Are... (by Tom Beland)
- True Story, Swear to God: This One Goes to Eleven (by Tom Beland)
- True Story, Swear to God: 100 Stories (by Tom Beland)

=== Art, design, and non-fiction ===
- Available Light
- Badlands: The Unproduced Screenplay
- Come in Alone
- The Making of Astronauts in Trouble
- Public Domain
- Surviving Grady
- Tales from Fish Camp
- True Facts
