= Demo (comics) =

Comic book series

- Cover of Demo #2

Publication information
- Publisher: AiT/Planet Lar (Volume One); Vertigo (Volume Two)
- Format: Limited series
- Publication date: November 2003 – September 2010
- No. of issues: 18

Creative team
- Written by: Brian Wood
- Artist: Becky Cloonan

Collected editions
- The Collection: ISBN 978-1-932051-42-1
- Volume 1: ISBN 978-1401216214

Demo is a twelve-issue limited series of comic books by writer Brian Wood and artist Becky Cloonan, published from 2003–2004 by AiT/Planet Lar. Each issue is an isolated story, but they all revolve around the lives of young people. Originally, the series was intended to focus on young people with supernatural powers—which many of the issues indeed do—but as the years progressed, the stories increasingly focused on people, relationships, and emotions, with the "supernatural" angle quietly deemphasized.

== Publication history ==
Demo was very well received. The series was not only embraced by the indie comics world, but also found some crossover success with superhero readers. Wizard, a steadfastly superhero-oriented comics magazine, named Demo its 2004 "Indie of the Year". The series was also nominated for two Eisner Awards in 2005, for "Best Limited Series" and "Best Single Issue" (for #7, "One Shot, Don't Miss").

Initially, Wood and publisher Larry Young emphasized the single-issue aspect of Demo, suggesting that the series would probably not be collected into a trade paperback. AiT/Planet Lar, generally seen as a publisher of graphic novels, held up Demo as proof that it had not abandoned the monthly-pamphlet format. The series was ultimately collected in 2005, minus the extra materials originally presented with the single issues.

In September 2007, the publishing rights to Demo had reverted to the creators, and in November the DC Comics imprint Vertigo was named as the publisher. They reprinted the original series as a 328-page trade paperback in June 2008 and later published a new 6-issue limited series, entitled Demo: Volume 2, starting in April 2010.

== Issues ==
Volume One:

- #1: NYC
- #2: Emmy
- #3: Bad Blood
- #4: Stand Strong
- #5: Girl You Want
- #6: What You Wish For
- #7: One Shot, Don't Miss
- #8: Mixtape
- #9: Breaking Up
- #10: Damaged
- #11: Midnight to Six
- #12: Mon Dernier Jour Avec Toi (My Last Night with You) [mistranslated, as the actual French text says "My Last Day with You"]

Volume Two:

- #1: The Waking Life of Angels
- #2: Pangs
- #3: Volume One Love Story
- #4: Waterbreather
- #5: Stranded
- #6: Sad and Beautiful World

== Collected editions ==
Both limited series have been collected into trade paperbacks:

- Demo: The Collection (328 pages, AiT/Planet Lar, December 2005, ISBN 978-1-932051-42-1)
- Demo: Volume 1 (328 pages, Vertigo, July 2008, ISBN 978-1-4012-1621-4)
- Demo: Volume 2 (160 pages, Vertigo, March 2011, ISBN 978-1-4012-2995-5)
- Demo (496 pages, Dark Horse Comics, March 2015, ISBN 978-1-61655-682-2)

The scripts have also been collected and published in their own volume:

- Demo: The Twelve Original Scripts (AiT/Planet Lar, January 2005, ISBN 978-1-932051-30-8)

== Awards ==
- 2005: Nominated for "Best Limited Series" Eisner Award

== See also ==
- Local
- NYX
