= CCXP =

Brazilian entertainment convention

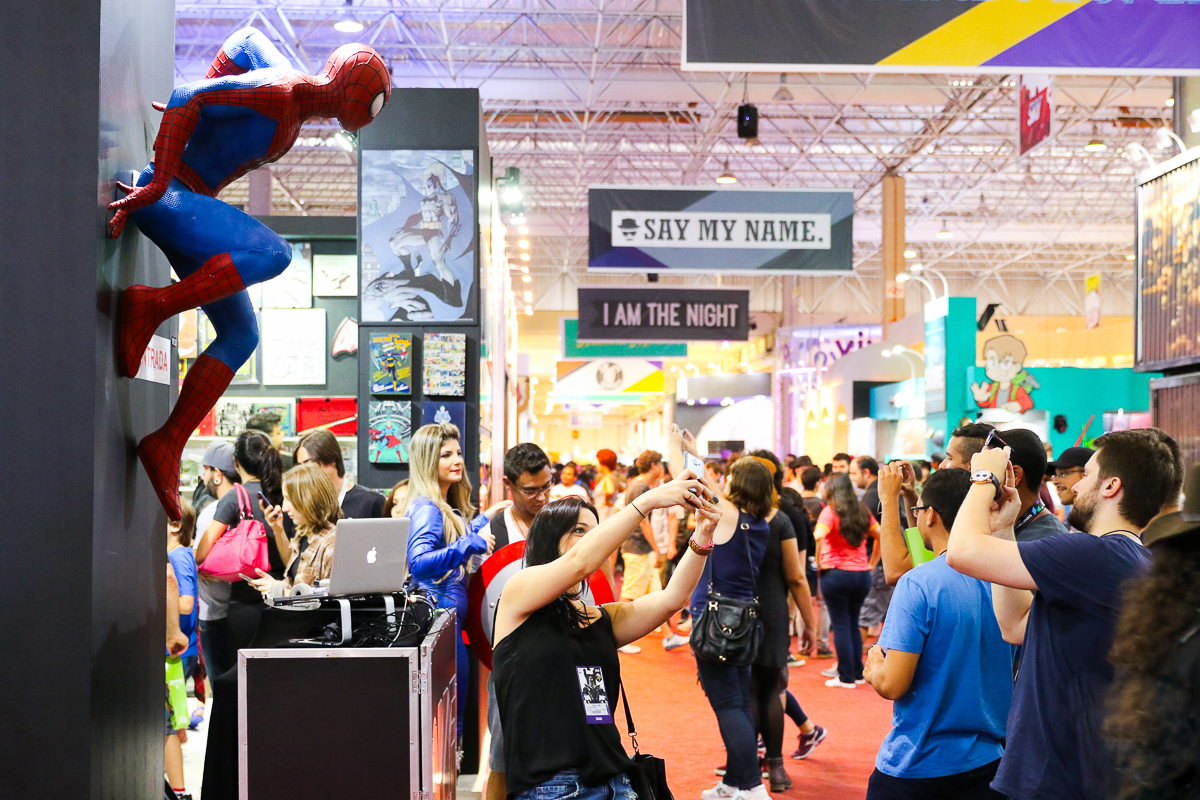
- CCXP in São Paulo in 2015.
- Status: Active
- Genre: Speculative fiction
- Venue: São Paulo Expo; Centro de Convenções de Pernambuco (CCXP Tour Nordeste); Koelnmesse (CCXP Cologne)
- Locations: São Paulo, São Paulo; Olinda, Pernambuco (CCXP Tour Nordeste); Cologne, North Rhine-Westphalia (CCXP Cologne); Mexico City (CCXP MX)
- Country: Brazil; Germany (CCXP Cologne); Mexico (CCXP MX)
- Inaugurated: December 4, 2014; 11 years ago
- Most recent: April 24, 2026; 6 months ago
- Next event: December 3, 2026; 22 days' time
- Attendance: 280,000 in 2019
- Organizer: Omelete
- Filing status: Non-profit
- Website: www.ccxp.com.br; www.ccxp-cologne.com

CCXP (originally called Comic Con Experience) is a multi-genre entertainment and comic convention that has been variously held in Brazil, Germany and Mexico. The largest pop-culture festival in the world, it is designed along the same lines as San Diego Comic-Con; its attractions and events focus on comics, television series, movies, video games, literature, and the internet.

== History ==
The first CCXP was held in December 2014 in São Paulo; it was organized jointly by the owners of the website Omelete, the comics agency Chiaroscuro Studios and the toy company Piziitoys. It was attended by an estimated 100,000 members of the public, and 80 companies participated in it. Invited artists, including Jason Momoa and Sean Astin, also attended.

=== History of each show ===
Dates	Location	Atten.	Guests
December 4–7, 2014	São Paulo Expo; São Paulo, Brazil	Around 100,000	Edgar Vivar, Jason Momoa, Mauricio de Sousa, Katie Cassidy, Lino Facioli, Brad Dourif, Fiona Dourif, Sean Astin, Scott Snyder, Joe Maddalena, Ariel Olivetti, Danilo Beyruth, Don Rosa, Fábio Moon, Gabriel Bá, Greg Tocchini, Gustavo Duarte, Ivan Reis, João Montanaro, José Luis García-López, Klaus Janson, Lu Cafaggi, Olivier Coipel, Rafael Albuquerque, Rafael Grampá, Sean Gordon Murphy and Vitor Cafaggi.
December 3–6, 2015	São Paulo Expo; São Paulo, Brazil	Around 142,000	Frank Miller, Krysten Ritter, Evangeline Lilly, Gerard Way, Alfonso Herrera, Misha Collins, Anna Popplewell, Aml Ameen, Jim Lee, John Rhys-Davies, Jamie Clayton, Mauricio de Sousa, Ivo Holanda, Steve Cardenas, David Finch, Meredith Finch, Ed Benes, Erica Awano, Esad Ribić, Felipe Massafera, Jae Lee, John Totleben, David Tennant, Dan DiDio, June Chung, Kevin Maguire, Mark Waid, Amy Chu, Mike Deodato, Mike McKone, Paulo Crumbim, Cristina Eiko, Pedro Cobiaco, Shiko, Affonso Solano, Chris Taylor, Emily Anderson, Lady Lemon, Hiro Kiyohara, Scott McCloud, Timothy Zahn, Érico Borgo and Marcelo Forlani.
December 1–4, 2016	São Paulo Expo; São Paulo, Brazil	196,000	Adam Nimoy, Evanna Lynch, David Zappone, Jim Michaels, Alan Davis, Vin Diesel, Arthur Adams, Kozo Morishita, Nina Dobrev, Bianca Pinheiro, Brian Azzarello, Mark Pellegrino, Cris Peter, Eduardo Risso, Frank Quitely, Gerardo Zaffino, Ian Livingstone, James Robinson, Joyce Chin, Julian Totino, Mahmud Asrar, Marcelo D'Salete, Marcello Quintanilha, Mark Farmer, Mateus Santolouco, Max Fiumara, Peter Kuper, Sebastián Fiumara, Tsutomu Nihei, Yanick Paquette, Paul Pope, Kay Pike, Yaya Han, Ruby Rose, Naomi Scott, Dacre Montgomery, Ludi Lin, RJ Cyler, Frank Miller, Natalie Dormer, Milla Jovovich, Paul W. S. Anderson, Neil Patrick Harris, Carlos Villagrán, Lauren Kate, Addison Timlin, David Ramsey, Katherine McNamara, Matthew Daddario, David Wenham, Dominic Sherwood, Emeurade Toubia and Alberto Rosende.
April 13–16, 2017	Centro de Convenções de Pernambuco; Olinda, Brazil	More than 54,000	Miguel Ángel Silvestre, Brandon Flynn, Alisha Boe, Christian Navarro, Finn Jones, Tom Pelphrey, Rodolfo Valente, Vaneza Oliveira, Mauricio de Sousa, Mike Deodato, Ivan Reis, Fábio Moon, Gabriel Bá, Adriana Melo, Bianca Pinheiro, Rafael Albuquerque, José Luis García-López, Paul Pope, Bill Sienkiewicz, Jock, Glenn Fabry
December 7–10, 2017	São Paulo Expo; São Paulo, Brazil	227,451	Will Smith, Alicia Vikander, Dylan O'Brien, Tye Sheridan, Simon Pegg, Joel Edgerton, David Ayer, Danai Gurira, Nikolaj Coster-Waldau, Alice Braga, Henry Zaga, Joel Kinnaman, Nick Jonas, Natalia Tena, Rebecca Mader, Austin St. John, Ariel Olivetti, Paul Azaceta, Arthur Adams, Joyce Chin, Carlos Ruas, Ben Templesmith, David Mack, Denys Cowan, Glenn Fabry, Humberto Ramos, Nicola Scott and Bernard Chang.
December 6–9, 2018	São Paulo Expo; São Paulo, Brazil	262,000	Tom Holland, Jacob Batalon, Brie Larson, Sophie Turner, Jessica Chastain, Sandra Bullock, Michael B. Jordan, Andy Serkis, Tom Welling, Sebastian Stan, Maisie Williams, John Bradley, Manu Bennett, Caleb McLaughlin, Noah Schnapp, Sadie Sink, Zachary Levi, Ricky Whittle, Simon Kinberg, Dean DeBlois, M. Night Shyamalan, Chris Columbus, John Romita Jr., Peter Milligan, Mike Deodato, Ivan Reis, Lee Weeks, David Michelinie, Scott Lobdell, John Cassaday, David Lloyd, Tom Grummett, Joe Rubinstein among others.
June 27–30, 2019	Koelnmesse; Cologne, Germany	More than 40,000	Brian Azzarello, Ben Barnes, Nikolaj Coster-Waldau, Mike Deodato, David Finch, Meredith Finch, Zachary Levi, David Lloyd, Rebecca Mader, Chuck Palahniuk, Mark Pellegrino, Joe Prado, Ivan Reis, Benedict Wong, Martin Perscheid
December 5–8, 2019	São Paulo Expo; São Paulo, Brazil	280,000	Henry Cavill, Kevin Feige, Shawn Levy, Joe Kerry, J. J. Abrams, Daisy Ridley, John Boyega, Oscar Isaac, Kathleen Kennedy, Dafne Keen, Ruth Wilson, Ryan Reynolds, Michael Bay, Margot Robbie, Mary Elizabeth Winstead, Jurnee Smollett-Bell, Rosie Perez, Ella Jay Basco, Gal Gadot, Patty Jenkins, Antony Starr, Erin Moriarty, David Yost, Karen Fukuhara, Jonathan Del Arco, Isa Briones, Frankie Adams, Steven Strait, Santiago Cabrera, Michelle Hurd, Cas Anvar, Dominique Tipper, Lana Parrilla, Alba Flores, Rodrigo de la Serna, Pedro Alonso, Esther Acebo, Darko Peric, Garret Dillahunt, Lesley-Ann Brandt, Takashi Shimizu, Maurício de Souza, Vera Egito, Cao Hamburguer, Frank Miller, Rafael Grampá, Christie Golden, Neal Adams, Mike Deodato Jr, Danilo Beyruth, Joëlle Jones, Frank Quitely, Eduardo Risso, Adriana Melo, Al Stefano, Roger Cruz, Charlie Adlard, David Roman, Tim Bradstreet, Mike Mickone, Eduardo Risso, Érica Awano, Fefê Torquato, Julio Simamoto, Ju Loyola, Laerte, Mikel Janín, Robson Rocha, Stout Club, Shiko, Sam Hart, Samuka Marinho, Ryan Smallman, Leon Chiro, Kes Von Puch, among others.
June 26–28, 2020	Koelnmesse; Cologne, Germany		Canceled due to COVID-19 pandemic, new date June 25–27, 2021 also canceled
December 3–6, 2020	São Paulo Expo; São Paulo, Brazil		Canceled due to COVID-19 pandemic
December 1–4, 2022	São Paulo Expo; São Paulo, Brazil		
November 30–December 3, 2023	São Paulo Expo; São Paulo, Brazil		
May 3–5, 2024	Centro Citibanamex; Mexico City, Mexico		
December 5–8, 2024	São Paulo Expo; São Paulo, Brazil		
May 30–June 1, 2025	Centro Banamex; Mexico City, Mexico		
December 4–7, 2025	São Paulo Expo; São Paulo, Brazil		
April 24–26, 2026	Centro Banamex; Mexico City, Mexico	TBA	TBA
December 3–6, 2026	São Paulo Expo; São Paulo, Brazil	TBA	TBA

== CCXP Awards ==
During the 2021 edition of the event, the organizers announced the creation of the CCXP Awards, an award focused on pop culture. The format of the first edition of the awards was announced in March 2022, with a total of 32 awards, divided into six categories with several subcategories.
