= Vasilis Lolos =

Greek comic book artist

Vasilis Lolos (Greek: Βασίλης Λώλος) is a Greek comic book artist known for his work on The Pirates of Coney Island for Image and 5, a self-published multi-national anthology. He also assisted My Chemical Romance in designing some of the elements for their Danger Days/Killjoys phase.

== Bibliography ==
Interior comic work includes:

- Omikron ROM-Zine (script and art, self-published DVD/CD-Rom and comic zine, 2002–2003)
- 9 (script and art, a weekly comics anthology supplement for Ελευθεροτυπία newspaper):
  - "The Freakshow" (2003)
  - "DeathPop" (2003–2004)
  - "Cyberpink" (2004)
- Γεννήτρια (script and art, graphic novel, Giganto Books, 2004)
- SUBart vol. 2 #2-3 (of 4 produced) (script and art, anthology, Giganto Books, 2004)
- GIN 474 #0: "ZomgZ" (script and art, self-published anthology with Vasilis Bibas and Ilias Kyriazis, 2005)
- Flight Volume 2: "Heads Up" (co-writer, script and art by Becky Cloonan, anthology graphic novel, Image, 2005)
- nebuli (script and art, with Becky Cloonan, self-published, 2006)
- Hats #1-2 (script and art, self-published, 2006–2007)
  - In 2011, remixed and re-published as a webcomic through MTV Geek.
  - In 2014, re-titled Maximum Overdrive and sold digitally - issue #1 through Comixology, #2 through Deth Grip.
- East Coast Rising Volume 1 (colours only, script and art by Becky Cloonan, graphic novel, Tokyopop, 2006)
- 24Seven Volume 1: "The Chelsea" (with Rick Spears, anthology graphic novel, Image, 2006)
- Blast! Comics: "Δαυλός" (with Steve Papas, anthology graphic novel, Giganto Books, 2006)
- The Pirates of Coney Island #1-6 (of 8) (with Rick Spears, Image, 2006–2007)
- The Last Call Volume 1-2 (script and art, graphic novel, Oni Press, 2007–2013)
- 5 (with Becky Cloonan, Rafael Grampá, Gabriel Bá and Fábio Moon, self-published anthology, 2007)
- Spider-Man Family #2: "Building a Better Lizard" (with Paul Benjamin, anthology, Marvel, 2007)
- Wolverine: Firebreak: "Little White Lies" (with Macon Blair, co-feature in one-shot, Marvel, 2008)
- Pixu: the Mark of Evil #1-2 (script and art, with Becky Cloonan, Gabriel Bá and Fábio Moon, self-published, 2008)
- The Nightmare Factory Volume 2: "Gas Station Carnivals" (with Joe Harris, anthology graphic novel, Fox Atomic, 2008)
- Buffy the Vampire Slayer: Tales of the Vampires: "The Thrill" (with Becky Cloonan, one-shot, Dark Horse, 2009)
- Northlanders #17: "The Viking Art of Single Combat" (with Brian Wood, Vertigo, 2009)
- The UNdroid (script and art, self-published, 2009)
- Superbadmanners (script and art, webcomic, So Comic, 2012)
- Conan the Barbarian vol. 2 #8-9: "Border Fury" (with Brian Wood, Dark Horse, 2012)
- Satan is Alive: A Tribute to Mercyful Fate: "Egypt" (script and art, anthology graphic novel by Mark Rudolph, 2012)
- Once Upon a Time: Shadow of the Queen: "Chapter Two" (with Corinna Bechko and Dan Thomsen, anthology graphic novel, Marvel, 2013)
- American McGee's Akaneiro #1-3: "The Path of Cloak and Wolf" (with Justin Aclin, Dark Horse, 2013)
- Ελευθεροτυπία: "Σεριφης Μπλαντ" (script and art, six episodes of weekly comic strip, 2013)
- Thrashers (script and art, webcomic, 2013)
- Starchild (script and art, webcomic, 2013)
- I Was a Preteen Alice Cooper (script and art, webcomic, VICE, 2014)
- Odysseia3000 (script and art, webcomic, 2014–2015)
- Morbid Tales!: An Illustrated Tribute to Celtic Frost: "Untitled" (script and art, anthology graphic novel by Mark Rudolph, 2014)
- Bartkira Volume 3 pages 266-267 (after Katsuhiro Otomo and Matt Groening, Internet art project, 2015)
- The Gate (script and art, self-published, 2016)
- Halo: Tales from the Slipspace: "Something Has Happened" (with Alex Irvine, anthology graphic novel, Dark Horse, 2016)

== Interviews ==
- Vamvounis, Manolis (August 25, 2006). "Vasilis Lolos on Pirates of Coney Island". Comics Nexus. Archived from the original on March 6, 2016.
- Arrant, Chris (July 18, 2008). "Team PIXU: Cloonan, Bá, Moon and Lolos Talk". Newsarama. Archived from the original on March 6, 2016.
- Arrant, Chris (July 1, 2009). "From Vikings to Vampires: Catching Up with Vasilis Lolos". Newsarama. Archived from the original on April 3, 2016.
- Arrant, Chris (September 7, 2012). "Conversing on Comics with Vasilis Lolos". Comic Book Resources. Archived from the original on April 6, 2016.
- Burton, Ryan (January 30, 2013). "Lolos Opens "Electronomicon" with "Last Call 2" & "Akaneiro"". Comic Book Resources. Archived from the original on June 15, 2013.
- Tantimedh, Adi (February 11, 2013). "Look! It Moves!: This Ain't No Party! This Ain't Sparta!". Bleeding Cool. Archived from the original on June 15, 2013.
