= The True Lives of the Fabulous Killjoys =

2013 comic book limited series

- Cover of the trade paperback edition

Publication information
- Publisher: Dark Horse Comics
- Format: Limited series
- Genre: Post-apocalyptic, adventure, drama, coming-of-age
- Publication date: June 12, 2013 – January 1, 2014
- No. of issues: 6
- Main character(s): The Girl; Dr. Death Defying; Cherri Cola; Val Velocity; Vamos; Vaya; Vinyl; Volume; Korse; Blue; Red

Creative team
- Written by: Gerard Way; Shaun Simon
- Artist: Becky Cloonan
- Letterer: Nate Piekos
- Colorist: Dan Jackson
- Editor: Sierra Hahn

The True Lives of the Fabulous Killjoys is a post-apocalyptic comic book limited series written by Gerard Way and Shaun Simon, illustrated by Becky Cloonan and published by Dark Horse Comics. The series serves as a sequel to the My Chemical Romance album Danger Days: The True Lives of the Fabulous Killjoys (2010), focusing on the followers of a group of vigilantes trying to continue their fight against a tyrannical megacorporation in a post-apocalyptic future.

== Synopsis ==
Following the aftermath of the first battle waged during Danger Days: The True Lives of the Fabulous Killjoys, the group's followers have kept to the desert while Better Living Industries continues to "strip citizens of their individuality". Only The Girl, the sole survivor of the original Killjoys, can help stir up the fight or join the masses in their mindlessness.

== Development ==
Gerard first announced the project, that would be co-written with Shaun Simon, at the 2009 San Diego Comic-Con and in 2012 New York Comic Con stated that artist Becky Cloonan would be producing the artwork. He commented that the comic would serve as the final part of the story and that it would not be "as frantic as what people are going to expect". Way also described the story as "a coming of age story about a young girl" and that she would be "[choosing] her own path". On July 21, 2020, Way announced that the original concept of the comic would be created in a new series titled The True Lives of the Fabulous Killjoys: National Anthem.

== Release schedule ==
Name	Release date
Issue #1 -- "Whatever Gets You Through the Night"	12 June 2013
Issue #2 -- "Ghost Stations"	10 July 2013
Issue #3 -- "Blind" or "Teenage Lightning"	14 August 2013
Issue #4 -- "Run!"	11 September 2013
Issue #5 -- "Waking the Destroya!"	30 October 2013
Issue #6 -- "Boom!"	1 January 2014

== Sequel ==
On September 21, 2020, Gerard Way announced a 6-issue sequel for the series titled The True Lives of the Fabulous Killjoys: National Anthem, which explores similar themes and characters through a different narrative lens. It has been described as a retelling of the original concept for the Killjoys’ story before the impact of the album. On October 14, 2020, the first issue of the series was released.

== Collected editions ==
On May 7, 2014, two separate collected editions of issues 1 through 6, as well as the Dead Satellites one-shot from Free Comic Book Day 2013, became available online through Things from Another World. One edition is a standard 160-page trade paperback, while the other, titled The True Lives of the Fabulous Killjoys: California, is a hardcover limited to just 2,500 copies, filled 232 pages and features an extensive sketchbook with artwork from Becky Cloonan, Gabriel Bá, Paul Pope, Gerard Way, Fábio Moon, Rafael Grampá and Brian Ewing.
