= Becky Cloonan =

American comic book creator

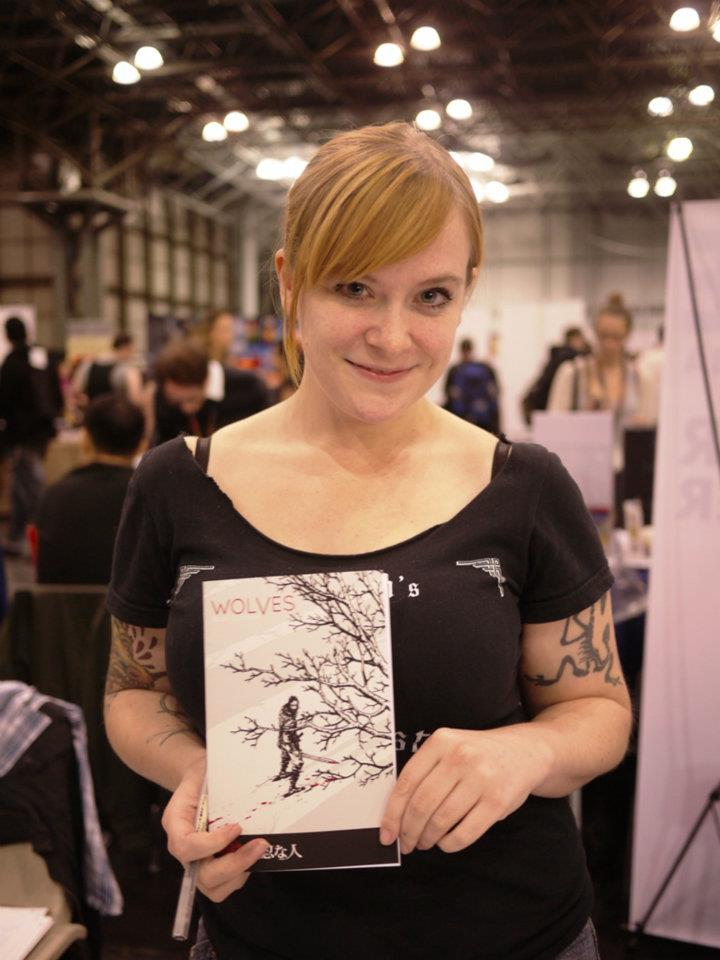
- Cloonan at the 2011 New York Comic Con
- Born: Rebecca Cloonan; June 23 Pisa, Italy
- Areas: Writer, Artist
- Notable works: Channel Zero: Jennie One; Demo; Flight nebuli East Coast Rising; American Virgin; Pixu: The Mark of Evil
- Awards: Inkpot Award (2023)

Becky Cloonan (born 23 June) is an American comic book creator, known for work published by Tokyopop and Vertigo. In 2012 she became the first female artist to draw the main Batman title for DC Comics.

== Early life ==
Becky Cloonan was born in Pisa, Italy. She attended New York's School of Visual Arts.

== Career ==
Cloonan and her friends produced a comics anthology that they called Meathaus.

Cloonan created minicomics as a member of the Meathaus collective before collaborating with Brian Wood on Channel Zero: Jennie One in 2003. Since then, her profile (and workload) has steadily risen; her best-known work to date has been the twelve-issue comics series Demo (2004), also with Wood. Wizard named Demo its 2004 Indie of the Year. The series was also nominated for two Eisner Awards in 2005, for Best Limited Series and Best Single Issue or One-Shot (the latter of which was for Demo #7, "One Shot, Don't Miss").

Cloonan's first solo graphic novel, East Coast Rising Volume 1, was released by Tokyopop in 2006. East Coast Rising: Volume 1 marked Cloonan's third Eisner Award nomination in 2007, this time for Best New Series. She also collaborated with writer Steven T. Seagle on the Vertigo Comics series American Virgin, which was cancelled with the 23rd issue. In 2012 she became the first woman to draw the main Batman title.

In 2013, she did the art for the series The True Lives of the Fabulous Killjoys, which is written by Gerard Way and Shaun Simon. In 2014/2015, she also co-created and did cover art and stories for Gotham Academy from DC Comics.

In 2015, she was voted #3 of the top 50 female comics artists of all time. She was also one of only two creators to make the list as both writer and artist, voted #14 among all-time top writers.

In 2017, Cloonan was one of several artists participating in the Pow! Wow! Worcester festival, the purpose of which was to bring large public murals to buildings throughout Worcester, Massachusetts. Cloonan painted her mural, which she completed on Labor Day, on the building housing the comic shop That's Entertainment.

In July 2021, DC Comics announced that Cloonan and Michael W. Conrad would co-write Batgirls, a new series which would focus on Barbara Gordon's mentorship of Cassandra Cain and Stephanie Brown. The debut issue was released on December 14, 2021, and garnered a positive review from Dustin Holland of CBR.com.

In 2024, Cloonan won the Eisner Award for Best New Series for her work with Tula Lotay on Somna: A Bed Time Story published by DSTLRY

== Bibliography ==
=== Self-published work ===
- Meathaus #6-8 (w/a, anthology, Meathaus Press, 2002–2006)
- nebuli (w/a, with Vasilis Lolos, 2006)
- 5 (w/a, with Rafael Grampá, Gabriel Bá, Fábio Moon and Vasilis Lolos, 2007)
- MINIS (w/a, collection of original mini-comics, 2007)
- Bury Your Treasure (w/a, collection of illustrations, 2008)
- Pixu #1-2 (w/a, with Gabriel Bá, Fábio Moon and Vasilis Lolos, 2008) collected as Pixu: the Mark of Evil (hc, Dark Horse, 128 pages, 2009, ISBN 1-59582-340-9; hc, 2015, ISBN 1-61655-813-X)
- By Chance or Providence: Stories by Becky Cloonan (hc, 108 pages, 2014, ISBN 0-9851962-3-8; tpb, Image, 2017, ISBN 1-5343-0186-0) collects:
  - Wolves (w/a, 2011)
  - The Mire (w/a, 2012)
  - Demeter (w/a, 2013)
- Black Church (as editor, w/a: Andy Belanger, 2012)

=== Dark Horse Comics ===
- 9-11 Volume 1: "Untitled" (w/a, anthology graphic novel, 196 pages, 2002, ISBN 1-56389-881-0)
- MySpace Dark Horse Presents #16: "I See the Devil in My Sleep" (w/a, anthology, 2008) collected in MySpace Dark Horse Presents Volume 3 (tpb, 168 pages, 2009, ISBN 1-59582-327-1)
- Buffy the Vampire Slayer: Tales of the Vampires: "The Thrill" (w, with Vasilis Lolos, one-shot, 2009) collected in Buffy the Vampire Slayer: Tales (hc, 288 pages, 2011, ISBN 1-59582-644-0)
- The Guild: Zaboo: "Zaboo's Escape" (a, with Felicia Day and Sandeep Parikh, one-shot, 2011) collected in The Guild: Knights of Good (tpb, 144 pages, 2012, ISBN 1-59582-900-8)
- Conan the Barbarian vol. 2 (a, with Brian Wood):
  - "Queen of the Black Coast" (in #1-3, 2012) collected in Volume 13: Queen of the Black Coast (hc, 152 pages, 2013, ISBN 1-61655-042-2; tpb, 2013, ISBN 1-61655-043-0)
  - "Border Fury, Part One" (in #7, 2012) collected in Volume 14: The Death and Other Stories (hc, 152 pages, 2013, ISBN 1-61655-122-4; tpb, 2013, ISBN 1-61655-123-2)
- The True Lives of the Fabulous Killjoys #1-6 (a, with Gerard Way and Shaun Simon, 2013–2014) collected as TTLOTF Killjoys (tpb, 160 pages, 2014, ISBN 1-59582-462-6)

=== DC Comics and Vertigo ===
- American Virgin (a, with Steven T. Seagle, 2006–2008) collected as:
  - Head (collects #1-4, tpb, 112 pages, 2006, ISBN 1-4012-1065-1)
  - Going Down (collects #5-9, tpb, 128 pages, 2007, ISBN 1-4012-1301-4)
  - Wet (collects #10-14, tpb, 128 pages, 2007, ISBN 1-4012-1494-0)
  - Around the World (includes #15-17 and 20–23, tpb, 224 pages, 2008, ISBN 1-4012-1831-8)
- Demo Volume II #1-6 (a, with Brian Wood, 2010) collected as Demo Volume II (tpb, 160 pages, 2011, ISBN 1-4012-2995-6)
- Northlanders #35-36: "The Girl in the Ice" (a, with Brian Wood, 2011) collected in Volume 5: Metal and Other Stories (tpb, 192 pages, 2011, ISBN 1-4012-3160-8)
- Beyond the Fringe #5-6: "Ghost Writer" (a, with Jhonen Vasquez, digital, 2012) collected in Beyond the Fringe (tpb, 144 pages, 2012, ISBN 1-4012-3798-3)
- Batman (a):
  - "Ghost in the Machine" (with Scott Snyder, in vol. 2 #12, 2012) collected in Batman: The City of Owls (hc, 208 pages, 2013, ISBN 1-4012-3777-0; tpb, 2013, ISBN 1-4012-3778-9)
  - "The Wedding" (with Tom King, among other artists, vol. 3 #50, 2018) collected in Batman: The Wedding (tpb, 208 pages, 2013, ISBN 1-4012-8338-1)
- Swamp Thing vol. 5 Annual #1: "Rotworld: Secrets of the Dead" (a, with Scott Snyder and Andy Belanger, 2012) collected in Volume 2: Family Tree (tpb, 160 pages, 2013, ISBN 1-4012-3843-2)
- American Vampire Anthology #1: "Greed" (w/a, 2013) collected in American Vampire Volume 6 (hc, 144 pages, 2014, ISBN 1-4012-4708-3; tpb, 2014, ISBN 1-4012-4929-9)
- Harley Quinn vol. 2 #0 (a, with Conner and Palmiotti, among other artists, 2014) collected in Volume 1: Hot in the City (hc, 224 pages, 2014, ISBN 1-4012-4892-6; tpb, 2015, ISBN 1-4012-5415-2)
- Batman: Black and White vol. 2 #6: "Bruce" (a, with Olly Moss, anthology, 2014) collected in Batman: Black and White Volume 4 (hc, 288 pages, 2014, ISBN 1-4012-4643-5; tpb, 2015, ISBN 1-4012-5062-9)
- Gotham Academy (w with Brenden Fletcher, a by Karl Kerschl, Mingjue Helen Chen (#6-7, 11, Divergence preview), Jeff Stokely (Endgame tie-in one-shot), Adam Archer and Msassyk, 2014–2017) collected as:
  - Welcome to Gotham (collects #1-6, tpb, 160 pages, 2015, ISBN 1-4012-5472-1)
  - Calamity (collects Divergence preview and #7-12, tpb, 144 pages, 2016, ISBN 1-4012-5681-3)
  - Welcome Back (collects Second Semester #1-8, tpb, 192 pages, 2017, ISBN 1-4012-7119-7)
  - The Ballad of Olive Silverlock (collects Second Semester #9-12, tpb, 128 pages, 2018, ISBN 1-4012-7474-9)
- Detective Comics #1000: "The Batman's Design" (a, with Warren Ellis, co-feature, 2019)
- Doom Patrol: Weight of the Worlds #5 (w/a, with Michael W. Conrad, DC's Young Animal, 2020)
- Wonder Woman (co-written with Michael W. Conrad), #770 (March 2021) - #800 (June 2023)
- Batgirls (co-written with Michael W. Conrad), #1 - #2 (December 2021 onwards)

=== Marvel Comics ===
- Marvel Knights: Strange Tales II #3: "King Crab!" (w/a, anthology, 2010) collected in Strange Tales II (hc, 144 pages, 2011, ISBN 0-7851-4822-1; tpb, 2011, ISBN 0-7851-4823-X)
- Nation X #2: "Cajun Justice!" (w/a, anthology, 2010) collected in Nation X (hc, 360 pages, 2010, ISBN 0-7851-3873-0; tpb, 2010, ISBN 0-7851-4103-0)
- Osborn #5 (a, with Kelly Sue DeConnick and Emma Ríos, 2011) collected in Osborn: Evil Incarcerated (tpb, 120 pages, 2011, ISBN 0-7851-5175-3)
- Victor Von Doom #1-4 (a, with Nick Spencer, cancelled before release)
- New Avengers vol. 2 #34 (a, with Brian Michael Bendis, among other artists, 2013) collected in Volume 5: End Times (hc, 112 pages, 2013, ISBN 0-7851-6158-9; tpb, 2013, ISBN 0-7851-6159-7)
- Young Avengers vol. 2 #15 (a, with Kieron Gillen, among other artists, 2014) collected in Volume 3: Mic-Drop at the Edge of Time and Space (tpb, 112 pages, 2014, ISBN 0-7851-8530-5)
- The Punisher vol. 11 (w, with Steve Dillon, Matt Horak, Laura Braga (#8) and Kris Anka (#13), 2016–2017) collected as:
  - On the Road (collects #1-6, tpb, 136 pages, 2017, ISBN 1-302-90047-1)
  - End of the Line (collects #7-12, tpb, 136 pages, 2017, ISBN 1-302-90048-X)
  - King of the New York Streets (collects #13-17, tpb, 112 pages, 2018, ISBN 1-302-90541-4)
- The Mighty Thor #700 (a, with Jason Aaron, among other artists, 2017) collected in Volume 5: The Death of the Mighty Thor (hc, 168 pages, 2018, ISBN 1-302-90660-7; tpb, 2018, ISBN 1-302-90661-5)
- Marvel Monsters (a, with Cullen Bunn, Scott Hepburn and various artists, one-shot, 2019)
- Bizarre Adventures: "Eveline O'Reilly" (w/a, with Michael Conrad, anthology one-shot, 2019)
- Dark Agnes #1-5 (w, with Lucas Pizzari, 2020)

=== Other publishers ===
- Revolving Hammer: "Aunty" (a, with Walter Conley, anthology, Cyberosia Publishing, 2002)
- Altered Realities: "Inversion" (a, with Sal Cipriano and Lou Platania, anthology, Cactus Fusion, 2003)
- AiT/Planet Lar:
  - Channel Zero: Jennie One (a, with Brian Wood, graphic novel, 72 pages, 2003, ISBN 1-932051-07-4)
  - Demo #1-12 (a, with Brian Wood, 2003–2004) collected as Demo (tpb, 328 pages, 2005, ISBN 1-932051-42-2)
- Vampirella Comics Magazine #4: "What Have We Become" (w/a, anthology, Harris, 2004)
- Image:
  - Flight Volume 2: "Heads Up" (w/a, with Vasilis Lolos, anthology graphic novel, 432 pages, 2005, ISBN 1-58240-477-1)
  - 24Seven Volume 1: "In for a Pound" (a, with John G and Leland Purvis, anthology graphic novel, 224 pages, 2006, ISBN 1-58240-636-7)
  - Southern Cross (w, with Andy Belanger, 2015–2018) collected as:
    - Volume 1 (collects #1-6, tpb, 160 pages, 2016, ISBN 1-63215-559-1)
    - Volume 2 (collects #7-12, tpb, 160 pages, 2017, ISBN 1-5343-0043-0)
    - Issues 13-16 remain uncollected.
- Hopeless Savages: B-Sides − The Origin of the Dusted Bunnies (a, with Jen Van Meter, Vera Brosgol and Mike Norton, one-shot, Oni Press, 2005)
- Bram Stoker's Dracula: The Graphic Novel (a, with Gary Reed, graphic novel, 176 pages, Puffin Books, 2006, ISBN 0-14-240572-8)
- Flight Volume 3: "Conquest" (w/a, anthology graphic novel, 352 pages, Ballantine Books, 2006, ISBN 0-345-49039-8)
- Blast! Comics: "Αειθαλής" (w/a, anthology graphic novel, 192 pages, Giganto Books, 2006, ISBN 978-960-88366-7-9)
- East Coast Rising (w/a, Tokyopop):
  - Volume 1 (196 pages, 2006, ISBN 1-59816-468-6)
  - Volume 2 (cancelled before release)
- K.G.B. (w/a, with Hwan Cho, webcomic, Estrigious, 2009–2010)
- TOME Volume 1: "The Months That Followed" (w/a, anthology graphic novel, 200 pages, IDW Publishing, 2013, ISBN 978-1-63140-459-7)
- Mouse Guard: Legends of the Guard vol. 3 #4: "The Lament of Poor Lenora" (w/a, anthology, Archaia, 2015) collected in Legends of the Guard Volume 3 (hc, 160 pages, 2015, ISBN 1-60886-767-6)
- Belzebubs (w/a, foreword in the form of a two-page comicstrip to the collection of Jussi-Pekka Ahonen's webcomic; hc, 120 pages, Top Shelf, 2019, ISBN 1-60309-442-3)
- Betwixt: "Never Left" (anthology graphic novel, co-written with Michael. W Conrad; hc, 200 pages, Viz, 2023, ISBN 978-1974741458)

=== Covers only ===
- NYC Mech: beta LOVE #4 (Image, 2005)
- The Pirates of Coney Island #1-6 (Image, 2006–2007)
- Hack/Slash vol. 2 #10 (Image, 2011)
- Pigs #4 (Image, 2011)
- Thought Bubble Anthology #1 (Image, 2011)
- B.P.R.D.: Hell on Earth — The Pickens County Horror #1-2 (Dark Horse, 2012)
- Before Watchmen: Minutemen #6 (DC Comics, 2013)
- Zero #1 (Image, 2013)
- Pretty Deadly #1 (Image, 2013)
- Red Sonja vol. 4 #5 (Dynamite, 2013)
- Wytches #1 (Image, 2014)
- Drifter #2 (Image, 2014)
- The Wicked + The Divine #5 (Image, 2014)
- Detective Comics vol. 2 #35 (DC Comics, 2014)
- Convergence: Aquaman #1-2 (DC Comics, 2015)
- The Kitchen #1-8 (Vertigo, 2015)
- Rebels #1 (Dark Horse, 2015)
- Southern Bastards #15 (Image, 2016)
- Shade, the Changing Girl #1-12 (DC's Young Animal, 2016–2017)
- Teenage Mutant Ninja Turtles Universe #13 (IDW Publishing, 2017)
- Codename Baboushka: Ghost Station Zero #1 (Image, 2017)
- The Spirit Centenary Newspaper (LICAF, 2017)
- Blackwood #1 (Dark Horse, 2018)
- Moon Knight #194-200 (Marvel, 2018)
- The Secret Loves of Geeks gn (Dark Horse, 2018)
- Shade, the Changing Woman #1-6 (DC's Young Animal, 2018)
- Calamity Kate #1-4 (Dark Horse, 2019)
- Reaver #1-6 (Skybound, 2019–2020)
- Faithless #5 (Boom! Studios, 2019)
- Nomen Omen #1 (Image, 2019)
- Wolverine: Exit Wounds #1 (Marvel, 2019)
- Basketful of Heads #1 (Hill House, 2019)

== Awards ==
In 2023, Cloonan was a recipient of the Inkpot Award at the annual San Diego Comic Con.
