= Andrew McLean =

Andrew McLean may refer to:

- Andrew Young McLean (1909–1988), Canadian newspaper publisher and politician
- Andrew McLean (American politician) (active since 2012), American politician from Maine
- Andrew McLean (footballer) (born 1973), Australian rules footballer
- Andrew McLean (tennis) (born 1969), Australian tennis player
- Andrew McLean (boxer) (born 1976), English boxer
- Andrew McLean, Head Curator of the National Railway Museum, York
- Andrew MacLean (comics) (active since 2013)

== See also ==
- Andrew McClean, Irish Gaelic footballer
- Andrew Stuart McLean (1948–2017), Canadian humorist and author
