= Daytripper (DC Comics) =

Comic

Publication information
- Publisher: Vertigo
- Format: Limited series
- Publication date: February – November 2010
- No. of issues: 10

Creative team
- Created by: Fábio Moon; Gabriel Bá
- Written by: Fábio Moon; Gabriel Bá
- Artist(s): Fábio Moon; Gabriel Bá
- Letterer: Sean Konot
- Colorist: Dave Stewart
- Editor(s): Brandon Montclare; Pornsak Pichetshote; Bob Schreck

Collected editions
- Daytripper: ISBN 1-4012-2969-7

Daytripper is a ten-issue American comic book limited series by brothers Fábio Moon and Gabriel Bá, published by the DC Comics imprint Vertigo. This graphic novel has won the 2011 Eisner Awards for “Best limited series or story arc”, Harvey Awards for “Best single issue or story”, and Eagle Awards for “Favourite new comicbook”.

== Synopsis ==
Brás de Oliva Domingos, the protagonist of the story, is the son of Benedito, an internationally renowned writer. He dreams to follow in his father's footsteps, but spends a good part of his early career writing the obituaries for a local newspaper. Only in his free time does he pursue his dream of being a novelist, which finally leads to the release of his first book. During the course of the ten episodes, however, the reader witnesses important days in Brás' life, including the challenges he is facing: travel, family, relationship, childhood, fatherhood. Each episode ends in a different version of him dying, all addressing the big questions of 'what is the meaning of life?' and 'what do you want to do with your life?'

== Setting ==
Daytripper takes place in São Paulo city where Brás lives along with his family and friends. The authors included some famous landmarks throughout the story, such as the Theatro Municipal de São Paulo in chapter 1, the Hospital Santa Catarina in chapter 4, and the Martinelli Building in chapter 6. However, Brás's adventures also take him to other places in to the Brazilian Northeast. In chapter 2, Jorge and Brás stare at the Chapada Diamantina National Park, and visit the Pelourinho, both in Bahia State. In this moment of the story, Bá and Moon explored some cultural and religious aspects of the region, including Iemanja and the rituals of Candomble people. According to Bá: "the most difficult thing wasn't trying to create a world that would look real". No, the hardest thing was creating a world that would feel real". Acemira is not a real place in Ceará State; the postcard that Brás holds in chapter 7 could be a reference to Iracema, a famous beach in Fortaleza City.

== Collected editions ==
The series has been collected into a trade paperback:

- Daytripper (256 pages, Titan Books, March 2011, ISBN 0-85768-237-7, DC Comics, February 2011, ISBN 1-4012-2969-7)
- Daytripper (272 pages, Titan Books, March 2011, ISBN 1401245110, DC Comics, April 2014, ISBN 1-4012-2969-7)

== Reception ==
The trade paperback went into The New York Times Paperback Graphic Books chart at #1 in February 2011, and returned to the chart at the same position in mid-March, where it stayed for a week, before dropping to #2 the following week.

Daytripper was selected as the 2014 Life of the Mind book at the University of Tennessee (UT) in Knoxville. The Life of the Mind program at UT is a common reading program for all incoming first-year students. Daytripper is the first graphic novel and the first Brazilian work to be selected for the program.

It is often named among the best graphic novels of the modern era. Prominent reviewer GoodOKBad gave it a perfect 3-star rating and praised the art and emotion that is brought along with the characters.

== Brazilian influences ==
Daytripper presents many Brazilian influences regarding language, literature and culture. The most predominant influence in the book is the main character's first name. The name "Bras" can be seen as a reference to the country Brazil, where Daytripper's creators were born, since this name is composed of the first four letters of the country written in Portuguese, "Brasil".

This name can also be perceived as a reference to one of the most famous characters in Brazilian literature, Brás Cubas. Such character appeared in Memórias Póstumas de Brás Cubas (The Posthumous Memoirs of Brás Cubas), by Brazilian author Machado de Assis. In an interview with "A Filanctera", a Brazilian blog about illustrations, Bá and Moon explained that the character "is a homage, a homage that makes sense because Bras's father is a very famous writer. The kind of father that would give his children the name of novel's characters. And also because Bras dies, and Brás Cubas dies as well". In both stories the characters are narrating the story of their deaths: while Bras Cubas makes it clear to the reader that he is already dead and is telling the story of his life, Bras de Oliva Domingos dies unexpectedly in many different ways at the end of each chapter.

Another Brazilian influence found in Daytripper is regarding the use of Portuguese language. In chapter 3, when Bras dies hit by a delivery truck, an important saying is written in it: "Foda. entregas". This translates is "Fuck. delivery", which could be perceived as a reference to the situation experienced by the main character, dying moments after seeing "...the woman he was going to spend the rest of his life with".

In addition to language and literature, Brazilians' behaviour regarding family is also depicted in Daytripper. In chapter 5, during which Bras and his parents visit his grandparents in the countryside, all the family is reunited: cousins, uncles, aunts. The act of getting the entire family united every weekend is a common tradition in Latin America, in which the value of family is highly considered. According to Clutter and Nieto: "Traditionally, the Hispanic family is a close-knit group and the most important 5 social units. The term familia usually goes beyond the nuclear family. The Hispanic 'family unit' includes not only parents and children but also extended family". Although Brazil is not a Hispanic country (being colonized by Portugal from 1500 to 1822), this custom is found in many Latin countries, from Latin America to the European colonizer ones (Portugal, Spain, Italy and France).

Another big influence of Brazilian culture in the graphic novel is related to food. In chapter 5, when the entire family is united to eat lunch, the dishes are all traditional in Brazilian cuisine. That basic meal consists of "rice and beans, potatoes, lettuce, — all very simple and homemade — but lunch always felt like a loud happy feast... Chicken was the kids' favorite dish, so grandma always cooked it". The basis of Brazilian lunches and dinners are chicken, lettuce, tomatoes, and potatoes. In accordance with Botelho: "Beyond the regional differences, the daily dish eaten on almost all tables of the country is the duo rice with beans, accompanied by a salad, some kind of meat and manioc flour. The Aurélio dictionary of the Portuguese language defines the duo feijão-com-arroz (beans with rice) as 'of everyday use; common; usual'. It is a true element of national identity, which embraces the people from North to South".

Daytripper also describes Brazilians' culture regarding soap operas. In chapter 5, when Bras says, "Grandma named the chickens after characters from her soap operas", the great influence of this type of show in Brazilian people is depicted. While in some countries movies or TV series are the most watched television program, in Brazil soap operas are by far the most famous type of program. According to Brazilian Business, "Rede Globo soap operas are really famous and it happens inside and outside the country. There are some other broadcasters that advertise their programs saying 'After the Globo's soap opera, switch to our channel'".

The tragedy of flight TAM 3905 refers to the real accident with the Flight TAM 3054 which happened on July 17, 2007. The disaster is still considered the worst one in Brazil's aviation history.

== Awards ==
- 2011:
  - Won "Best Limited Series or Story Arc" Eisner Award
  - Won "Best Single Issue or Story" Harvey Award
  - Won "Favourite New Comicbook" Eagle Award
