= Pencey Prep =

American rock band (1998–2002)

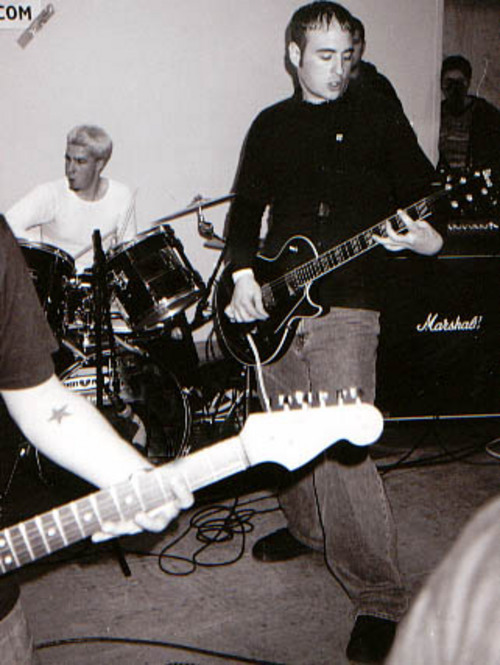
- Pencey Prep performing in 2000. From left to right: Frank Iero (cut off), Tim Hagevik, Neil Sabatino.

Background information
- Origin: Belleville, New Jersey, U.S.
- Years active: 1998–2002
- Labels: B.CALM Press; Mint 400 Records; Eyeball Records; Riversideriot
- Past members: Tim Hagevik; Frank Iero; John McGuire; Neil Sabatino; Shaun Simon; Bruno Rocha
- Website: myspace.com/penceyprep

Pencey Prep were an American rock band. Comprising Frank Iero, Tim Hagevik, John McGuire, Shaun Simon, and Neil Sabatino, the band was formed by Iero and McGuire in Belleville, New Jersey in 1998. They released their debut studio album, Heartbreak in Stereo, in November 2001 through Eyeball Records. The band shortly split up afterwards, with Iero in particular going on to be the rhythm guitarist for the American rock band My Chemical Romance. Music critics such as Rachael Dowd of Alternative Press credit Pencey Prep for developing Iero's successful music career.

== History ==
=== 1998–2002: Formation, Heartbreak in Stereo, and disbandment ===
Pencey Prep consisted of Frank Iero, Tim Hagevik, John McGuire, Shaun Simon, and Neil Sabatino. The band was formed by Iero and McGuire in Belleville, New Jersey in 1998. Iero formed Pencey Prep after his previous band, Sector 12, had finished their final tour. After the band formed, they recruited Hagevik on drums, Simon on keyboards, Sabatino on guitar, and later Bruno Rocha from Sector 12 on lead vocals. Mikey Way, the bassist for the American rock band My Chemical Romance, attempted to join the band, but failed the audition process. McGuire described the members as "pretty much inseparable" from one another.

Originally, the band's name was going to be Whatch You Talkin Bout Willis, until McGuire gave Iero a challenge of using the name that they had come up with, or stick to a new name by the next day. After reading The Catcher in the Rye (1951), Iero was struck by the name Pencey Prep, the school in which main character Holden Caulfield gets expelled from. They recorded a demo, and Rocha's vocals were disliked by the band. Rocha was kicked out of Pencey Prep, and they later recorded another demo, this time with Iero on vocals, and sent it to Eyeball Records' Alex Saavedra. Saavedra recalled that Iero was "a really confident kid with a lot of passion". Saavedra ended up signing them, and they set out to record their debut studio album, Heartbreak in Stereo, at Nada Recording in New Windsor, New York.

In 2000, Pencey Prep released their debut single, "...Trying to Escape the Inevitable.", through Riversideriot; afterwards, they self-produced and released their second single, "Long Walk to Forever". The biographer Tom Bryant stated Pencey Prep generated a "small but loyal following" around this time. In August 2001, Sabatino left Pencey Prep, deeming it as "the catalyst that lead to the band ending". In November that year, the band released Heartbreak in Stereo, through Eyeball; it was their only full-length studio release before their break-up. Bryant claimed that it was full of "vicious but unfocused hardcore", featuring Iero in "full berserker mode: screaming, howling and raging into the microphone". Heartbreak in Stereo takes influences from Weezer, System of a Down, Saves the Day, and Dashboard Confessional. The band went on a tour in support of the album, with My Chemical Romance often being the support act.

Saavedra stated that Heartbreak in Stereo "wasn't much good", writing: "Clearly I didn't care if your band was good or not – I mean I put out the Pencey Prep record out, didn't I? I actually disliked the record, but I liked the kids because they had a lot of heart." Iero believes that Saavedra never really enjoyed Pencey Prep, going on to say: "I don't believe for one second that he really liked our band, by no means were we a fantastic band but we loved playing and we wanted it". During the band's tour from 2001–2002, they became frustrated with the low ticket sales. They became increasingly dissatisfied with the way the tour was going, which caused arguments and disagreements with the band members. According to Iero, they had another guitarist fill in for Sabatino, but he stated it "just didn't feel right". Hagevik sustained leg injuries at one point, which prevented him from touring and playing drums. By May 2002, Pencey Prep had broken-up.

=== Aftermath ===
Iero went on to join My Chemical Romance, where he achieved fame by becoming their rhythm guitarist. Sabatino went on to form Fairmont, and Simon began writing comic books, even co–writing The True Lives of the Fabulous Killjoys (2013–2014) with My Chemical Romance front man Gerard Way.

Brii Jamieson of Rock Sound described Pencey Prep as "an integral part of the burgeoning punk and hardcore scene in their home state of New Jersey back in the very very early 2000s", writing for Alternative Press, Rachael Dowd noted that Pencey Prep "helped lay down the groundwork for Iero's successful music career".

== Band members ==
Final line-up

- Tim Hagevik – drums (1998–2002)
- Frank Iero – lead and backing vocals (1999–2002), guitars (1998–2002)
- John McGuire – bass, backing vocals (1998–2002)
- Shaun Simon – keyboards, synthesizer (1998–2002)

Former

- Neil Sabatino – guitars, backing vocals (2000–2001)
- Bruno Rocha – lead vocals (1999)

== Discography ==
Studio albums

- Heartbreak in Stereo (2001/2007, Eyeball Records, 2020/2021 Mint 400 Records & B.Calm Press)

Singles

- "...Trying to Escape the Inevitable." (2000, Riversideriot)
- "Long Walk to Forever" (2000, Self-Released)
