= Rafael Grampá =

Brazilian comic book artist and director

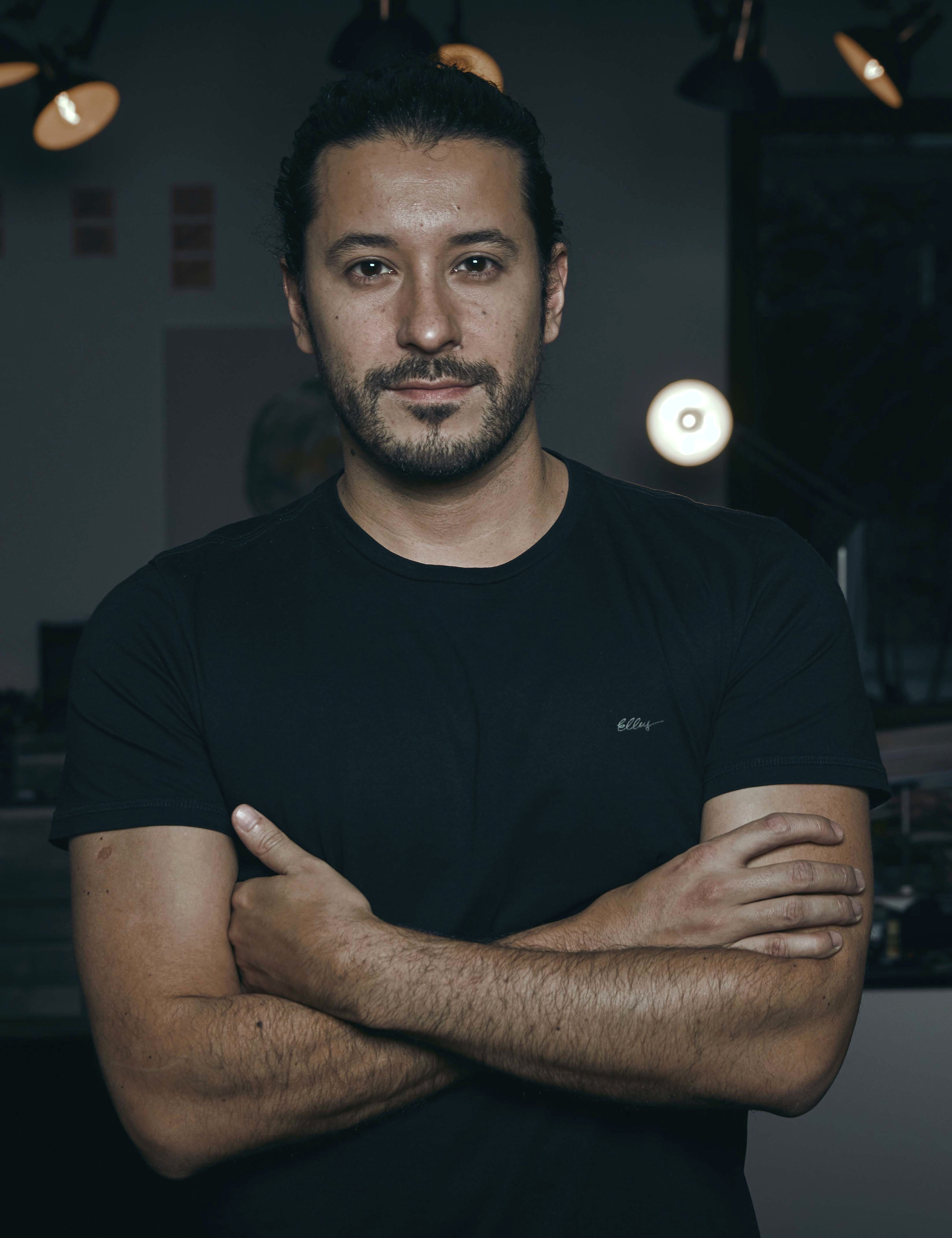
- Grampa at his studio in July 2018
- Born: April 27
- Areas: Writer, Penciller, Inker
- Notable works: 5 Mesmo Delivery; The Dark Knight Returns: The Golden Child
- Awards: 2008 Eisner Award for Best Anthology

Rafael Grampá is a Brazilian comic book artist and film director, best known for his creator-owned graphic novel Mesmo Delivery and DC Comics' The Dark Knight Returns: The Golden Child.

== Career ==
At the age of 14, Grampá drew flags for Rio Grande do Sul municipalities, made t-shirt prints, store logos and children's party decorations. In 2001, he became art director of RBS TV, a subsidiary of Rede Globo in southern Brazil. In 2004, Grampá moved to São Paulo, where he worked as animation director and concept designer for the animation studio Lobo (Vetor Zero), developing animation films and special effects. In 2007, Grampá decided to leave the field of animation and focus exclusively on comics. In 2008, he published Mesmo Delivery, which won the HQ Mix Awards for Best Artist and Best Especial Graphic Novel. That same year, Grampá, along with Gabriel Bá and Fábio Moon, received an Eisner Award for their self-published anthology 5, which marked the first time the award has been presented to Brazilian comic book artists.

Since then, Grampá's written and drawn a number of short stories for Marvel and DC Comics, such as "Dear Logan", which appeared in the Strange Tales II anthology series, and a Batman story for the Batman: Black and White series. Grampá has also directed several short films, including Dark Noir (2014), an animated film sponsored by Absolut Vodka and released simultaneously in 21 countries, and Romeo Reboot (2015), a live-action film inspired by Shakespeare's classic story. In 2017, Grampá and his partners started Handquarters, a content development studio and production company, where Grampá directed the live-action film A Geek Punk Story. Grampá other credits include The Dark Knight Returns: The Golden Child, a sequel to the 1986 DC Comics mini-series The Dark Knight Returns, written by Frank Miller.

== Bibliography ==
=== Interior art ===
- Gunned Down: "Lao Family's Fish Market" (script and art, anthology, Terra Major, 2006)
- 5 (with Becky Cloonan, Gabriel Bá, Fábio Moon and Vasilis Lolos, self-published anthology, 2007)
- Mesmo Delivery (script and art, graphic novel, Desiderata, 2008)
- Hellblazer #250: "All I Goat for Christmas" (with Brian Azzarello, co-feature, Vertigo, 2009)
- Strange Tales II #1: "Dear Logan" (script and art, anthology, Marvel MAX, 2010)
- Batman: Black and White vol. 2 #2: "Into the Circle" (script and art, anthology, DC Comics, 2013)
- The Dark Knight Returns: The Golden Child (with Frank Miller, one-shot, DC Black Label, 2020)
- Batman: Gargoyle of Gotham #1–4 (DC Black Label, 2023–2026)

=== Cover work ===
- Dead of Night featuring Werewolf by Night #4 (Marvel MAX, 2009)
- American Vampire #6 (Vertigo, 2010)
- The Unexpected #1 (Vertigo, 2011)
- Uncanny X-Force #19 (Marvel, 2012)
- The Massive #1–3 (Dark Horse, 2012)
- Dominique Laveau: Voodoo Child #1–7 (Vertigo, 2012)
- TMNT: The Secret History of the Foot Clan #1 (IDW Publishing, 2012)
- Bloodshot and the H.A.R.D. Corps #14 (Valiant, 2013)
- Catalyst Comix #1, 4, 7 (Dark Horse, 2013)
- Shadowman vol. 4 #5 (Valiant, 2013)
- All-New X-Men #25 (Marvel, 2014)
- Head Lopper #1 (Image, 2015)
- Detective Comics vol. 2 #50 (DC Comics, 2016)
- Batman vol. 3 #1 (DC Comics, 2016)
- The Dark Knight III: The Master Race #6 (DC Comics, 2016)
- Gotham City Garage Chapter 5 (Note: The cover is also used for chapter 6 and the print edition of Gotham City Garage #3.) (DC Digital, 2017)
- Batwoman vol. 2 #15 (DC Comics, 2018)
- Moonshine #11 (Image, 2018)
- The Magic Order #2 (Image, 2018)
- Kick-Ass vol. 2 #7 (Image, 2018)
- Prodigy #4 (Image, 2019)
- Sharkey the Bounty Hunter #3 (Image, 2019)
- Wonder Woman #754 (DC Comics, 2020)
- The Flash #754 (DC Comics, 2020)
- The Batman's Grave #8 (DC Comics, 2020)
- Dark Nights: Death Metal — Infinite Hour Exxxtreme! #1 (DC Comics, 2021)
- Action Comics #1028 (DC Comics, 2021)
- BRZRKR #1–4 (Boom! Studios, 2021)
- Wonder Girl vol. 2 #1 (DC Comics, 2021)
- Batman: Gargoyle of Gotham #1 (DC Comics, 2023)
- Batman: Gargoyle of Gotham #2 (DC Comics, 2024)
- Batman: Gargoyle of Gotham #3 (DC Comics, 2025)
- Batman: Gargoyle of Gotham #4 (DC Comics, 2026)
