= So Comic =

Greek webcomic platform

- Screenshot of So Comic, showing a portion of Pan Pan's Κούκλες (Dolls).
- Owner: Ion
- Website: socomic.gr
- Launched: September 2011

So Comic is a Greek webcomic platform created by chocolate wafer company ION in 2011. Featuring original works by Greek cartoonists such as Antonis Vavagiannis and Con Chrisoulis, So Comic is the most successful blog in the country.

== Concept ==
In the late 2000s and early 2010s, Greek chocolate wafer company Ion experimented with managing Facebook pages dedicated to various topics, such as cinema and music. In a 2017 interview with Parallaxi magazine, Michalis Filippidis, Product Manager of Ion, stated that "the most important element now in social media is the creation of original content." The company concluded that creating a new platform fully dedicated to creation of original content was the best choice. Ion collaborated with three or four artists who were already creating webcomics on their own blogs, and launched So Comic in September 2011. All webcomics on So Comic are original works created for the platform.

== History ==
Every year starting in 2012, So Comic has had an exhibition at the Comicdom convention in Athens, selling comic books and merchandise from its various cartoonists. In 2017, the website had 75,000 monthly visits, making it the most-visited blog in Greece. At that point, So Comic had collaborated with over 50 Greek cartoonists.

Ion's financial support of its artists continued despite the Greek government-debt crisis of the 2010s, and Greek webcomics gained more popularity during the COVID-19 pandemic as people were self-isolating at home.

== Webcomics ==
So Comic features works created by various Greek webcartoonists, such as:

- Antonis Vavagiannis, creating his webcomic Kourafelkythra, which began on Vavagiannis' personal blog in 2007 before joining So Comic. Vavagiannis' work has since been published in print by Jemma Press and luben.tv.
- Con Chrisoulis, posting his biographical webcomics Tales of The Smiths and Dryland, which have since been published in print by Omnibus Press and Markosia Enterprises respectively.
- Michalis Dialynas
- Ilias Kyriazis, posting his webcomic It's My Party, which has since been published by Giganto Books.
- Tasmar
