= Chuck BB =

American comic book artist

- Born: 1981 (age 44–45) Redondo Beach, California
- Areas: Writer, Penciller, Inker, Letterer
- Notable works: Black Metal
- Awards: Eisner Award for Special Recognition (2008)

Chuck BB (born 1981) is an American comic book creator, best known for his work on Spider-Man, Fear Agent, and Oni's Black Metal.

== Published works ==
Chuck BB's works include:

- The Art of Boom! Studios (Boom! Studios, 2011)
- Black Metal (Oni Press, 2007)
- CBGB (Image Comics, 2010)
- Drink and Draw Social Club (2010)
- Fear Agent (Image Comics, 2005)
- Flight (2004)
- New Avengers (2010)
- PopGun (Image Comics, 2007)
- Secret Skull (IDW, 2004)
- Spider-Island: I Love New York City (Marvel Comics, 2011)
- Spider-Man: Spider-Island Companion (Marvel Comics, 2012)
- Steve Niles Omnibus (2008)
- Wasteland (2006)
- Western Tales of Terror (2004)

== Recognition ==
- 2008 Chuck BB, Black Metal (artist, Oni)
