= 5 (comics) =

2007 comics anthology

- Date: 2007
- Page count: 40 pages

Creative team
- Writers: Gabriel Bá, Becky Cloonan, Fábio Moon, Rafael Grampá, Vasilis Lolos
- Artists: Gabriel Bá, Becky Cloonan, Fábio Moon, Rafael Grampá, Vasilis Lolos

5 is a comics anthology by Gabriel Bá, Becky Cloonan, Fábio Moon, Rafael Grampá and Vasilis Lolos.

The title won the 2008 Eisner Award for Best Anthology.
