= American Virgin (comics) =

American comic book series

- Cover to issue #1 of American Virgin (May 2006), art by Frank Quitely.

Publication information
- Publisher: Vertigo (DC Comics)
- Schedule: Monthly
- Format: Ongoing series
- Publication date: May 2006 – March 2008
- No. of issues: 23
- Main character(s): Adam Chamberlain

Creative team
- Created by: Steven T. Seagle; Becky Cloonan
- Written by: Steven T. Seagle
- Penciller(s): Becky Cloonan
- Inker(s): Jim Rugg; Ryan Kelly
- Colorist(s): Brian Miller
- Editor(s): Karen Berger

Collected editions
- Head: ISBN 1-4012-1065-1
- Going Down: ISBN 1-4012-1301-4
- Wet: ISBN 1-4012-1494-0
- Around the World: ISBN 1-4012-1831-8

American Virgin is an American comic book series published by Vertigo Comics and written by Steven T. Seagle and illustrated by Becky Cloonan. The series launched on a monthly schedule in March 2006 and was canceled two years later. Seagle was able to finish his storyline.

The story follows the life of Adam, a teenager who is a born-again Christian preacher, as well as his struggle with issues of his sexuality and faith. Adam's near constant companion is a stepsister, Cyndi, who is sexually liberal.

== Publication history ==
The covers for the first three issues were penciled by Frank Quitely, while issues #4–14 featured covers by Joshua Middleton. Starting with issue #15 the cover artist was Celia Calle. Most of the series is penciled by Becky Cloonan with two issues drawn by Ryan Kelly.

== Plot ==
There are five major story arcs: the first is "Head", consisting of four issues. The second is "Going Down", which consists of five issues. The third saga, "Wet" also contains five issues. The fourth story arc "Around the World" contained five issues as well. The series was canceled with the final arc, "Sixty-Nine", in issues #20–23.

=== Head (issues #1–4) ===
The first story arc "Head" introduces the main character Adam Chamberlain, a 21-year-old Christian preacher promoting sexual abstinence until marriage. Adam is proud of his virginity and his engagement to his girlfriend Cassie, currently on a peace corps mission in Africa; he believes she was chosen by God to be his wife. After being taunted with a stripper by his cousins, Adam flees to the home of his stepsister Cyndi. While watching television he learns that Cassie has been killed and beheaded by terrorists.

Adam and Cyndi flee her home when two men enter looking for her and open fire with pistols. Adam then finds his younger brother at home, about to have sex with a girl. They have a confrontation and then Adam informs his mother and stepfather that he is going to Africa to find out what happened to Cassie. He and Cyndi fly to South Africa, where Adam sees Cassie's body and has a breakdown.

Adam finds out there was semen in Cassie's body and decides to find out the truth. He hires a mercenary named Mel who says he can find the answers he wants. The trio go on a search across Africa and along the way Adam attempts to introduce Christian values to the natives. Throughout the journey, Adam has erotic visions of Cassie and finally succumbs to masturbation. Finally, they are able to find one of the men involved in Cassie's murder and he and Adam have a violent confrontation that ends in the perpetrator's death.

=== Going Down (issues #5–9) ===
"Going Down" begins with Adam returning home. Cyndi returns to her apartment, where the drug dealers who had previously tried to kill her are waiting. They hold her at gunpoint, but Mel saves her, knocking the men out. Adam delivers the eulogy at Cassie's funeral but has another breakdown and a highly sexual vision of a naked Cassie rising up from her coffin. Afterwards he is propositioned by a young woman who wants to lose her virginity with him, but he refuses. Mel appears and tells him that he has found information on the mastermind behind Cassie's murder.

Adam, Cyndi and Mel travel to Australia, where they continue Adam's book tour. They stay with brother and sister: Deacon and Clauda. During this time period, Adam discovers that Deacon is gay. Outside one of Adam's speeches, he has another strange encounter with a transgender reporter, who mocks him. Adam speaks of the reporter, Alex, in his speech and reduces her to tears. Afterward Mel shows up with video of Cassie's execution. Adam views it and has another vision of Cassie.

Adam finds the executioner at a gay sadomasochism club and goes undercover to get him to confess. After taking Adam with him to the dungeon, the killer discovers who Adam is and threatens to kill him if they ever meet again before making his escape. Adam flees but discovers from his agent the next day that he has been seen and outed as a homosexual.

Adam becomes distraught over people thinking he is gay and has a revealing conversation with Deacon that examines both Deacon's thoughts on God and Adam's thoughts on homosexuality. Adam then learns that Mel has had a personal score with the same terrorists who killed Cassie and has been using him the whole time for information. He confronts Mel outside the hotel room that the killer is staying in and knocks him unconscious. Adam then tries to finish the job of the executioner himself. He cannot bring himself to do it, however. He almost ends up dead, if not for Mel arriving at the nick of time and shooting the killer in the head. Adam and Cyndi then take a flight home, but their plane crashes into the ocean.

=== Wet (issues #10–14) ===
The first issue of this story arc deals with Adam's past and ends with his revelation that Cassie may not have been the girl God intended for him. The second sees Adam returning to his ministry in the aftermath of the plane crash. He begins to search for the other girls he believes God may have intended for him to be with, which leads him to his uncle's mansion, where he is forced to join in one of his uncle's sex games and meets the first girl on the list.

After that he has a talk with his stepfather about the pornographic film he did in his younger years. When they get to the hospital to visit Cyndi, they find that she has been taken and they must find her. Before he is able to start looking his brother Levi shows him the second girl on his list and discovers that she is not his "soulmate". Back at his house he finds that Cyndi was not taken, but saved by Mel from the people looking for her. Adam finds out that this is because she stole a porno tape she had made to prevent its release.

Adam returns to the pageant, where he sees the woman that he thought had saved him from the plane crash, working there. Cyndi and Mel are in the pool house kissing when she tears open his shirt to find that Mel is transgender and was born a woman, just before a hurricane arrives and knocks over the pool house building. The hurricane also knocks down the pageant hall before they can get started, but not before he sees another vision of Cassie telling him in fact that Vanessa was not actually on the plane but was a vision from God telling him who his soulmate was. He then decides to join Vanessa on a tour around the world so that she can find herself.

=== Around the World (issues #15–19) ===
"Around the World" begins in Rio de Janeiro where Adam and Vanessa have gone for Carnival. After Carnival Adam goes to the beach only to see that Vanessa is topless. This deeply disturbs him, causing him to run off to call Cyndi. Unbeknownst to him, she is currently having sex with Mel, because Cyndi has decided she loves him even though he is transgender. Adam and Vanessa next go to Japan to stay with Vanessa's college roommate and go to the Festival of the Iron Phallus, a festival dedicated to the penis which Adam sees as obscene but eventually comes to realize that different cultures have different taboos. When they arrive in Bangkok, Adam books a hotel room for him and Vanessa, breaking Vanessa's rule to not spend money on anything, so she storms off angrily. Adam calls home for advice and Mel tells him to go and see a tattoo artist in Bangkok. While getting the tattoo Adam has a vision, in which he and Cassie finally have sex. Later on Adam decides to have his first real sexual experience with Vanessa, deciding that she is his real love, not Cassie.

=== Sixty-Nine (issues #20–23) ===
Sixty-Nine is the last story arc in the series. In this series, Adam returns to his home and informs his parents that he has married Vanessa. His mother is furious at this announcement and proceeds to have the marriage annulled when she finds out that Adam has not consummated his marriage yet. In the midst of all this, his stepbrothers manage to locate his biological father in Cuba. Adam, his mother Mamie, wife Vanessa, stepsister Cindy and Mel go to Cuba in order to confront his original father. On reaching Cuba, it is learned that Mamie's father had threatened to kill Adam, thus forcing Reydel (the biological father) to abandon Mamie and head back to Cuba where he is now a priest. Mamie has a heart attack and is moved to a hospital.

In the meantime, Adam is married formally in a chapel to Vanessa by his father. Before he is able to consummate his marriage, Mel kidnaps him and takes him to the Dominican Republic where he plans revenge on the terrorists who killed his girlfriend and Adam's original girlfriend Cassie. Mel is injured and it is up to Adam to exact the revenge, though he is loath to do so. The lead terrorist instigates Adam to open a suitcase which purportedly contains a video showing the killing of his girlfriend. Adam takes the bait, only to result in an explosion which flattens the entire building site. Rescuers locate Adam under the debris and ask his name. He tells them his name and dies while uttering "I am a virgin" in the last scene: a shockingly tragic end to what can be considered a story which is mainly humorous in nature.

== Collected editions ==
The series has been collected into a number of trade paperbacks:

Title	ISBN	Publication date	Reprinted issues
American Virgin: Head	ISBN 1-4012-1065-1	October 25, 2006	American Virgin #1–4
American Virgin: Going Down	ISBN 1-4012-1301-4	July 25, 2007	American Virgin #5–9
American Virgin: Wet	ISBN 1-4012-1494-0	November 21, 2007	American Virgin #10–14
American Virgin: Around the World	ISBN 1-4012-1831-8	July 15, 2008	American Virgin #15–23
