= Casanova (comics) =

Comic book series

- Casanova #1 (June 2006), art by Gabriel Bá

Publication information
- Publisher: Image Comics; Icon Comics
- Format: Ongoing series
- Genre: Spy
- Publication date: June 2006 - present
- No. of issues: 26

Creative team
- Written by: Matt Fraction
- Artist(s): Gabriel Bá (#1-7, #15-26); Fábio Moon (#8-14, #19-26)
- Letterer(s): Sean Konot; Dustin Harbin
- Colorist: Cris Peter

Collected editions
- Luxuria hardcover: ISBN 978-1-58240-689-3
- Gula hardcover: ISBN 978-1-58240-866-8

Casanova is a creator-owned comic book series by writer Matt Fraction and artists Gabriel Bá and Fábio Moon.

The series follows the story of Casanova Quinn, a famous thief who becomes a double agent in international espionage.

== Publication history ==
The first issue of Casanova was released in June 2006 and published in the Slimline format of 16 pages of story per issue, sold at the price of $1.99.

The publisher for the series was initially Image Comics from 2006 until a hiatus in 2008. In 2011, the series continued under the publisher Icon Comics. In 2014, the series moved back to Image Comics for the fourth volume. Fraction has stated a desire for seven volumes, each named after one of the seven deadly sins.

=== Volume publication details ===
Title	Release date	Publisher	Format	Pages	ISBN
Casanova - Volume 1: Luxuria	May 2007	Image Comics	Hardcover	144	978-1582406893
Casanova - Volume 1: Luxuria	January 2008	Image Comics	Trade paperback	144	9781582408972
Casanova - Volume 1: Luxuria (colored)	January 2011	Icon Comics	Trade paperback	160	978-0785148623
Casanova - Volume 2: Gula	July 2011	Icon Comics	Trade paperback	136	978-0785148630
Casanova - Volume 3: Avaritia	July 2012	Icon Comics	Trade paperback	152	978-0785148647
Casanova - Volume 1: Luxuria; The Complete Edition	November 19, 2014	Image Comics	Hardcover	168	978-1632151612
Casanova - Volume 2: Gula; The Complete Edition	January 7, 2015	Image Comics	Hardcover	168	978-1632151810
Casanova - Volume 3: Avaritia; The Complete Edition	April 1, 2015	Image Comics	Hardcover	176	978-1632151919
Casanova - Acedia Vol. 1	October, 2015	Image Comics	Trade paperback	136	978-1632154774
Casanova - Acedia Vol. 2	May 2017	Image Comics	Trade paperback	136	978-1632158758

== Plot ==
=== Casanova Vol. 1: Luxuria #1-7 ===
At the beginning of the first issue, Casanova "Cass" Quinn works as a freelance thief and espionage artist who has turned his back on the rest of the Quinn family. His father, Cornelius, runs the world-spanning spy organization E.M.P.I.R.E. of which Casanova's twin sister Zephyr is a top agent, while his mother Anna has been hidden away in a vegetative state for unknown reasons. Casanova is the black sheep in the family and only makes contact with his father after his sister is killed during a mission. They meet again and fight at her funeral.

At the funeral, a mystery device is planted on Casanova without his knowledge. The device thrusts him into the inner sanctum of Newman Xeno, a bandaged super-genius hedonist running an evil organization called W.A.S.T.E. Xeno reveals that Casanova has been transplanted into a parallel timeline, and has moved from his original Timeline 909 to Timeline 919. Here, Casanova is the dead E.M.P.I.R.E. agent while Zephyr is a thief working for W.A.S.T.E. The morally ambivalent Casanova is drawn into a deceitful game where he appears as his dead counterpart to work both sides of the W.A.S.T.E./E.M.P.I.R.E. coin.

Casanova is forced to undertake various missions and counter-missions, including removing a former E.M.P.I.R.E. Agent who is the ruler of a sex island, and killing David X, a magician whose stunts could lead to his being seen as a messiah. At the end of the volume, Cass manages to break free of Xeno's control. With his newly acquired team, he decides to begin genuinely working for E.M.P.I.R.E., operating out of a giant Japanese World War II era robot.

=== Casanova Vol. 2: Gula #8-14 ===
Also subtitled as 'When Is Casanova Quinn?', Casanova's team has a new mission, to stop a revolutionary new aircraft powered by the mysterious 'H-Element'. The book then skips forward 2 years, with a masked E.M.P.I.R.E. agent fighting the plane, now a reality. The aircraft is piloted by a blue-skinned multi-armed woman called Sasa Lisi, who asks the agent, Kaito (Casanova's 'Intern') 'When is Casanova Quinn?'

Sasa Lisi is from the future, and an agent of M.O.T.T. who claims not only to be a lover of Casanova's from the future but also that finding him is essential to the survival of the 'Multiquintessence'.

Elsewhere, Zephyr has returned, and is working with Kubark Benday, son of the head of X.S.M. and 'potential future love interest'. She and Kubark are hired by her former lover, Newman Xeno, who offers her ten billion dollars to return to him, she refuses but agrees to do the contract job, hitting on all the people who know about H-Element, including Cornelius Quinn.

After successfully killing all three people who know about the H-Element, it is revealed that Zephyr was working undercover for E.M.P.I.R.E. and everyone she and Kubark killed was robot, including Cornelius. Kaito mourns the death of Ruby, who he does not elect to revive.

Cornelius and the gang race toward X.S.M.'s island, where Xeno and the Bendays are about to launch Lisi's shuttle which, along with the H-Element, will grant Xeno's past self the Fakebook. The closer the gun gets to launching, the more body parts Lisi seems to grow, existing in multiple, conflicting timestreams. Zephyr, too, begins to display some of Lisi's side effects, until she is shot by a mourning Kaito. It is then revealed that Zephyr was Casanova, working to try to atone for his sins by undoing everything. Cornelius, angry at his son's death, elects to fire the gun and preserve history.

In the final pages, Casanova is returned to the male form, Kubark rails at his betrayal, and David X sneaks in and escapes with Xeno and Kubark. Casanova, now shunned by his father, agrees to work for E.M.P.I.R.E., though Cornelius will not recognize him as his son.

=== Casanova Vol. 3: Avaritia #1-4 ===
Casanova is chronically sick and at odds with his father, Cornelius Quinn. E.M.P.I.R.E.'s new mission is to destroy Newman Xeno by destroying every alternate timeline they can find in the past.

In one of the alternate timelines, Casanova discovers Newman Xeno's real name: Luther Desmond Diamond.

The mission changes tactics and instead of obliterating an entire universe, Casanova now kills that timeline's version of Luther Desmond Diamond, which he finds to be less morally reprehensible, but more personal. Casanova develops affection for Luther Desmond Diamond and decides to spare one of the versions.

Casanova and Sasa Lisi become romantically involved with the spared Luther Desmond Diamond, and Sasa Lisi formulates a plan to hide Luther from E.M.P.I.R.E. Luther Desmond Diamond is sent to a secret location that only Casanova knows.

Casanova and Newman Xeno have a fistfight aboard the crashing E.M.P.I.R.E. flagship, ending with Newman Xeno unraveling into nothingness.

Kaito, avenging Ruby's death, shoots Cornelius Quinn in the head.

Sabine Seychelle, who has taken over E.M.P.I.R.E. during Cornelius Quinn's medical leave, turns the tables on Casanova and begins hunting down alternate versions of Casanova in other timelines.

Casanova crashes Sasa Lisi's time machine crashes and he finds himself in another dimension, in Hollywood California.

=== Casanova: Acedia Vol. 1: #1-4 ===
After a crash like that, Casanova Quinn can't even remember his name. With no memory of who he is or what he's done, he chooses the name "Quentin Cassaday". He is found and given room by Amiel Boutique, who runs a secret intel group called N.E.T.W.O.R.K., and in gratitude, he starts working for him as a right-hand man of sorts.

This arrangement runs smoothly for about three years. Then one night after one of Boutique's giant parties, Cassaday is attacked by a woman who only appeals to his sense of curiosity when she whispers to him "Casanova Quinn". Cassaday survives the attack but the whole event is witnessed by Boutique, who reveals that like Cassaday, he also doesn't remember his past or who he is. Liking Cassaday precisely for his similar mysterious background, Boutique suggests the two cross-research each other.

Almost immediately as Cassaday begins research on Boutique's past, he is hunted down by a strange group wearing masks, and everywhere he turns he faces circular magical symbols that tag the ground or sometimes, to Cassaday's annoyance, the car he drives for Boutique. These symbols sometimes act as protection but more often than not are used to summon demons and assassins from other timelines.

During Cassaday's search for answers and help, he meets this timeline's versions of his past allies, including Kaito (now a successful cop in the LAPD), Ruby (Kaito's wife of four years, and not a robot), a Sabine Seychelle (a woman who owns an enigmatic bookstore). He also meets McShane, Kaito's hard-punching partner at the LAPD, and Thelonius Godchild, a magician, and informant who remembers Boutique's past but won't admit it for his safety. Meeting Cassaday invites trouble for all of them, as they are attacked by two triplets all named Fabulon, and Kaito is seriously injured with a stab wound to his midsection. The third Fabulon attacks Cassaday and Boutique, but upon his death warns Cassaday that everyone from his previous timeline is coming after him.

Afterward, Cassaday finds himself in solitude when he is taken hostage by Suki, who purports to be Sasa Lisi, Boutique's estranged adopted daughter. Along with her accomplice Heath, they resurface with the intent to assassinate Boutique, whose actual name is Akim Athabadze, and eliminate all traces of him from history.

Issue #4 is entirely a flashback issue, delineating Akim Athabadze's brutal upbringing and his part at E.M.P.I.R.E.

At the end of every issue is a shorter, ongoing, parallel side story of The Metanauts, written by Michael Chabon and illustrated by Gabriel Bá. It unfolds the journey of the four women undercover as the members of the superstar band T.A.M.I., hopping from timeline to timeline to assassinate all alternate versions of Cassanova Quinn.

== Reception ==
Kieran Shiach of ComicsAlliance stated that Casanova felt "new and dangerous" and full of ideas to him but expressed disappointment that the third volume had a more "traditional" aesthetic. Jodi Odgers of Multiversity Comics called it a "complex and maniac masterpiece" in another review of the first issue, also noting it was "breakneck pace".
