= Shaun Simon =

American comics writer

Shaun Simon is an American comics writer. He is from Clifton, New Jersey. He wrote The True Lives of the Fabulous Killjoys with Gerard Way, lead vocalist of My Chemical Romance, for Dark Horse Comics as well as writing Neverboy, also for Dark Horse. He also wrote Collapser with Mikey Way for DC Comics and The Umbrella Academy spinoff prequel series based on Klaus Hargreeves titled You Look Like Death. He has wrote Paranoid Gardens with Gerard Way, the Electric Century tie in comic and Open Caskets with Pencey Prep member Neil Sabatino.

== Career ==
Shaun Simon is the former keyboardist for the New Jersey band Pencey Prep, which he founded with Frank Iero and John "hambone" McGuire. Following the band's break-up in 2002, he accompanied Iero’s band My Chemical Romance on tour. It was while on tour that many of the ideas for Killjoys comic book took shape. At the 2012 New York Comic Con, it was announced that a first look at the series would be released on 2013's Free Comic Book Day. The series was drawn by artist Becky Cloonan and edited by Sierra Hahn. In 2015, Simon wrote Neverboy, published by Dark Horse Comics. His next comic, Art Ops, ran from 2015 to 2016 under DC Comics' Vertigo imprint. He then wrote Wizard Beach for Boom! Studios and co-wrote Collapser with Mikey Way under the DC imprint Young Animal. In 2020, he co-wrote You Look Like Death: Tales From The Umbrella Academy and The True Lives of the Fabulous Killjoys: National Anthem with Gerard Way.

Simon has also worked outside the comics medium and was the winner of the Predators and Editors readers poll for his flash fiction story "Snowman".
