= Rick Spears =

American comic book writer

- Area: Writer
- Notable works: Teenagers from Mars; The Pirates of Coney Island; AXIS: Carnage

Rick Spears is an American comic book writer, best known for Teenagers from Mars and The Pirates of Coney Island.

== Early life ==
Both Spears and his main collaborator Rob G. grew up in Richmond, Virginia, although they first met only after moving to New York City:

[We] have lived sort of parallel lives. We're from the same place, went to the same college and have a bunch of the same friends but we never met until we both moved to Brooklyn.

== Career ==
In 2001, Spears and Rob G. began self-publishing their debut series Teenagers from Mars. In 2003, the pair produced a short Batman story for DC Comics. Upon completing Teenagers from Mars, they formed Gigantic Graphic Novels to collect the issues and release their first graphic novel, Dead West, following up with the 5-issue mini-series Repo, published by Image Comics. Other work from Spears includes the Black Metal trilogy of graphic novels with artist Chuck BB, a variety of short stories for Marvel and the graphic novel adaptation of the film Jennifer's Body.

== Bibliography ==
=== Early work ===
- Teenagers from Mars #1–8 (with Rob G., self-published, 2001–2003) collected as Teenagers from Mars (tpb, 272 pages, 2005, ISBN 0-9763038-0-9)
  - In order to release the collected edition of Teenagers from Mars, Spears founded his own publishing house called Gigantic Graphic Novels.
  - Gigantic only managed to put out three more releases (with the first of the three being written by Spears) before ceasing operation:
    - Dead West (with Rob G., graphic novel, 144 pages, 2005, ISBN 0-9763038-1-7)
    - Rotting in Dirtville (written and drawn by James Callahan, graphic novel, 120 pages, 2006, ISBN 0-9763038-2-5)
    - Hellcity Volume 1 (written by Macon Blair, drawn by Joe Flood, graphic novel, 104 pages, 2006, ISBN 0-9763038-3-3)
- Detective Comics #785–788: "The Dogcatcher" (with Rob G., co-feature, DC Comics, 2003–2004)
- Métal Hurlant vol. 2 #12: "A Call to Arms" (with Rob G., anthology, Humanoids Publishing, 2004)
  - Collected in Métal Hurlant Volume 1 (hc, 192 pages, 2011, ISBN 1-59465-026-8)
  - Collected in Métal Hurlant: Selected Works (tpb, 240 pages, 2020, ISBN 1-64337-519-9)
- Filler (with Rob G., graphic novel, 96 pages, AiT/Planet Lar, 2005, ISBN 1-932051-32-5)

=== Image Comics ===
- Put the Book Back on the Shelf: "The State I Am In" (with Rob G., anthology graphic novel, 144 pages, 2006, ISBN 1-58240-600-6)
- 24Seven Volume 1: "The Chelsea" (with Vasilis Lolos) and "Transformer" (with Rami Efal, anthology graphic novel, 224 pages, 2006, ISBN 1-58240-636-7)
- The Pirates of Coney Island #1–6 (of 8) (with Vasilis Lolos, 2006–2007)
  - The series went on hiatus before the last two issues were finished; in a 2012 interview, Lolos mentioned he was no longer involoved with the project.
  - A collected edition was solicited for a 2012 release but subsequently cancelled: The Pirates of Coney Island (tpb, 132 pages, ISBN 1-58240-772-X)
- Repo #1–5 (with Rob G., 2007) collected as Repo (tpb, 152 pages, 2008, ISBN 1-58240-874-2)

=== Oni Press ===
- Black Metal (with Chuck BB, series of graphic novels):
  - Black Metal (160 pages, 2007, ISBN 1-932664-72-6)
  - Black Metal: The False Brother (136 pages, 2011, ISBN 1-932664-99-8)
  - Black Metal: Darkness Enthroned (160 pages, 2014, ISBN 1-934964-82-4)
  - Black Metal Omnibvs (collection of all three volumes — tpb, 472 pages, 2014, ISBN 1-62010-143-2)
- The Darkest Hour (with various artists, free promotional art book given away at New York Comic Con, 2011)
- The Auteur (with James Callahan):
  - The Auteur #1–5 (2014) collected as The Auteur: Presidents Day (tpb, 144 pages, 2014, ISBN 1-62010-135-1)
  - The Auteur: Sister Bambi #1–5 (2015) collected as The Auteur: Sister Bambi (tpb, 128 pages, 2016, ISBN 1-62010-260-9)
- My Riot (with Emmett Helen, graphic novel, 184 pages, 2020, ISBN 1-58240-600-6)

=== Marvel Comics ===
- Astonishing Tales: Boom Boom and Elsa: "Super Boys!" (with James Callahan, free digital mini-comic, 2009)
  - First published in print as a co-feature in Marvel Heartbreakers (anthology one-shot, 2010)
  - Collected in Bloodstone and the Legion of Monsters (tpb, 312 pages, 2017, ISBN 1-302-90802-2)
- Immortal Weapons #3: "Urban Legend" (with Timothy Green II, 2009) collected in Immortal Iron Fist: The Complete Collection Volume 2 (tpb, 496 pages, 2014, ISBN 0-7851-8890-8)
- Iron Man: Iron Protocols: "His Girl Friday" (with Iban Coello, co-feature in one-shot, 2009) collected in Iron Man: Tales of the Golden Avenger (tpb, 128 pages, 2010, ISBN 0-7851-4279-7)
- Daredevil: Black and White: "Secrets and Lies" (with Mick Bertilorenzi, anthology one-shot, 2010)
- Deadpool Team-Up #885: "Guest Starring: Hell Cow" (with Philip Bond, 2011) collected in Deadpool Team-Up: BFFs (hc, 168 pages, 2011, ISBN 0-7851-5139-7; tpb, 2011, ISBN 0-7851-5140-0)
- Wolverine #1000: "Last Ride of the Devil's Brigade" (with Timothy Green II, co-feature, 2011) collected in Wolverine: Prehistory (tpb, 504 pages, 2017, ISBN 1-302-90386-1)
- AXIS: Carnage #1–3 (with German Peralta, 2014–2015) collected in AXIS: Carnage and Hobgoblin (tpb, 136 pages, 2015, ISBN 0-7851-9311-1)

=== Other publishers ===
- Postcards: True Stories That Never Happened: "Operation Torch" (with Rob G., anthology graphic novel, 160 pages, Villard Books, 2007, ISBN 0-345-49850-X)
- Fear Agent #23: "Heath_{2}0" (with James Callahan, co-feature, Dark Horse, 2008)
  - Collected in Fear Agent Library Edition Volume 2 (hc, 520 pages, 2014, ISBN 1-61655-103-8)
  - Collected in Fear Agent: The Final Edition Volume 4 (tpb, 248 pages, Image, 2018, ISBN 1-5343-0875-X)
- Jennifer's Body (with Tim Seeley, Jim Mahfood, Nikki Cook and Ming Doyle, graphic novel, 112 pages, Boom! Studios, 2009, ISBN 1-60886-501-0)
