= Tales of The Smiths =

Graphic novel

- Date: 2018
- Page count: 464 pages
- Publisher: Omnibus Press

Creative team
- Creator: Con Chrisoulis

Original publication
- Published in: So Comic
- Date of publication: 2012-2014

Tales of The Smiths is a graphic novel biography about the early years of the seminal indie band The Smiths by multidisciplinary creator Con Chrisoulis.

== Publication history ==
From September 2012 until September 2014, Con Chrisoulis researched, wrote, illustrated and published Tales of The Smiths as a daily online webcomic on the Greek website Socomic.gr. Published originally as a bilingual webcomic (in English and Greek), he published 450 episodes within two years. Tales of The Smiths was subsequently picked up by Omnibus Press who collected and published all the webcomics within a single paperback in 2018.

The collected graphic novel features an introduction by Simon Wolstencroft, who was The Smiths' original drummer and a member of The Fall and Patrol, Ian Brown and John Squire's band before the Stone Roses.

== Plot ==
Tales of The Smiths retells the lives of the band's teenage years in Manchester, before the group was formed, and it includes side-stories on the sociopolitical climate in 1970s England, as well as short biographies regarding their inspirations, from the New York Dolls to Nico and from the Sex Pistols to Patti Smith.

The graphic novel culminates with Johnny Marr knocking on Morrissey's door, the band's formation in 1982, and their initial gigs as The Smiths.
