= Con Chrisoulis =

Greek-Australian artist and academic

- Born: Victoria, Australia
- Areas: Writer, Penciller, Inker
- Notable works: Tales of Unsurpassed Vanity; Giant-Size Fascists; Tales of The Smiths; Dryland; Rebel Rebel
- Awards: Comic book of the year (Greece, 2008); Comic book of the year (People's choice award) (Greece, 2010); First Fictions Finalist for Dryland Book One (UK, 2012)

Con Chrisoulis is a Greek Australian multidisciplinary artist and academic most famous for his graphic novels, Tales of The Smiths, Dryland, and Rebel Rebel.

== Career ==
Chrisoulis was born in Victoria, Australia to Greek Australian migrants.

In 1996, he self-published his first comic book series, Clans, in Melbourne, Australia, which lasted three issues. The following year he collaborated with writer Nick Bugeja on the superhero comic book series Bloodsport (Impulse Comics). In the late 1990s, he emigrated to Athens, Greece, and began self-publishing his personal comic book anthology, Tales of Unsurpassed Vanity (Greek: Ιστορίες Ατελείωτης Ματαιοδοξίας), one of Greece's longest-running self-published independent comics. Tales of Unsurpassed Vanity lasted ten issues, ending in 2004.

From 2002 to 2006, Chrisoulis collaborated with 9 (Ennea) magazine, a Greek comics anthology that was included as a free supplement every Wednesday within Eleftherotypia newspaper. He serialised his science fiction series Vacant Testament (Greek: Κενή Διαθήκη) within the pages of 9 (Ennea) magazine, making it the first long-running sci-fi comics series published in a Greek mainstream comic book.

In 2007, he released the first volume of his acclaimed political satire comic book series, Giant-Size Fascists. After the first volume was released, the series continued in monthly episodes in Galera (Γαλέρα) magazine from 2007 to 2008. The two volumes of Giant-Size Fascists earned him Greek comic book of the year awards by popular vote in 2008 and 2010.

His graphic novel Dryland, which narrates the violent deaths of most of his ancestors in Interwar Greece, was a finalist at the Myriad Editions' First Fictions competition and was released in 2016 by Markosia Enterprises.

Singer-songwriter of two concept art bands, Autodivine and the UK-based band Ghosts of Future Past, he has released two illustrated concept albums with linear narratives and post-punk aesthetics.

From 2012 until 2014, he researched and serialised daily his webcomic series Tales of The Smiths about the early unknown days of Morrissey and seminal indie band The Smiths, a 450-page collected edition of which will be released by Omnibus Press in 2018.

Since 2016, he has been researching, writing and drawing Rebel Rebel: The graphic biography of David Bowie, the weekly webcomic biography of David Bowie, which has been hosted on Patreon, through which self-published collections are regularly made available to supporters. In 2017, he began researching and serialising his latest webcomic series King: The graphic biography of Jack Kirby, about the Ashkenazi Jewish origins of the visual creator of Marvel Comics.

Chrisoulis has been working at Teesside University since 2018 and has been appointed as the Course Leader of the School of Arts and Creative Industries' BA (Hons) Illustration course. His research output at the university has focused on the development, production and dissemination of graphic biographies.

As of October 2026 he is now the course leader for BA(hons) Comic and Concept Art at Leeds Arts University.

== Bibliography ==
=== Works in Australia ===
- Clans #1-3. MoJo Comics, 1996–1997.
- Bloodsport #1 (written by Nick Bugeja). Impulse Comics, 1997.

=== Works in Greece ===
- Tales of Unsurpassed Vanity (Greek: Ιστορίες Ατελείωτης Ματαιοδοξίας) #1-10. MoJo/Dark Wave Comics, 2001–2004.
- Jazz and Maria TPB – collects the vampire stories from Tales of Unsurpassed Vanity #1-5. MoJo/Dark Wave Comics, 2002.
- Hesiod's Theogony. Evandros Press, 2003. ISBN 9780009996801
- Babel #226. 2004.
- Homer's Iliad (Ομήρου Ιλιάς). Evandros Press, 2004.
- Homer's Odyssey (Ομήρου Οδύσσεια). Evandros Press, 2004.
- 9 (Ennea) magazine (2004)
- Red.Dot Comix #10, 2004, #12, 2005. (participation with short stories and pin-ups)
- Roppongi #2. 2006. (participation with a pin-up)
- Herodotus' The Battle of Thermopylae (Ηροδότου Η Μάχη των Θερμοπυλών). Evandros Press, 2006.
- Giant-Size Fascists. Haramada, 2007. ISBN 9789608900332
- Autobio Comics, gonzo journalist comics published within Big Fish magazine. 2007–2008.
- Galera (Γαλέρα) magazine (monthly episodes of Giant-Size Fascists and short comics stories). 2007–2008.
- Giant-Size Fascists ConMix Extravaganza. Jemma Press, 2009. ISBN 9789606732492
- Autodivine - EP. Jemma Press, 2009. ISBN 9789606732386
- At The Drive Ink (short story in anthology inspired by garage rock band The Last Drive). Tilt Comics, 2010.
- Giant-Size Fascists reprint. Jemma Press, 2010. ISBN 9789606732492

=== Works in UK ===
- Dryland Book One|||Chapter One. 2012.
- Dryland Book One. Markosia Enterprises, 2016. ISBN 978-1909276932
- Tales of The Smiths. Omnibus Press, 2018. ISBN 9781783055876
- King: The graphic biography of Jack Kirby Chapter One. Self-published, 2018.
- Rebel Rebel The graphic biography of David Bowie Chapter One. Self-published, 2018.
- Rebel Rebel The graphic biography of David Bowie Chapter Two. Self-published, 2019.
- Rebel Rebel The graphic biography of David Bowie Chapter Three. Self-published, 2020.
- Rebel Rebel The graphic biography of David Bowie Chapter Four. Self-published, 2021.
- Rebel Rebel The graphic biography of David Bowie Chapter Five. Self-published, 2021.
- Rebel Rebel The graphic biography of David Bowie Chapter Six. Self-published, 2022.
- Rebel Rebel The graphic biography of David Bowie Chapter Seven. Self-published, 2022.
- Rebel Rebel The graphic biography of David Bowie Chapter Eight. Self-published, 2023.
- Rebel Rebel The graphic biography of David Bowie Chapter Nine. Self-published, 2023.
- Rebel Rebel The graphic biography of David Bowie Chapter Ten. Self-published, 2023.
- Rebel Rebel The graphic biography of David Bowie Chapter Eleven. Self-published, 2023.

=== Digital Comics ===
- Tales of The Smiths. ComiXology, 2018.
- King: The graphic biography of Jack Kirby Chapter One. ComiXology, 2020.
- Rebel Rebel The graphic biography of David Bowie Chapter One. ComiXology, 2020.
- Rebel Rebel The graphic biography of David Bowie Chapter Two. ComiXology, 2021.

=== Webcomics ===
- Tales of The Smiths. Socomic, 2012–2014.
- Dryland Book One. Socomic, 2015–2016.
- King: The graphic biography of Jack Kirby. Webtoons, 2017-
- Rebel Rebel The graphic biography of David Bowie. Patreon, 2016-

== Other work ==
=== As illustrator ===
- Freelance editorial illustrator for Big Fish magazine (2007-2009)
- Illustrator for lecture series at Amnesty International (2012)
- Illustrator/Graphic Designer for The International Federation of Red Cross and Red Crescent Societies' communication needs with the refugee crisis (2016)

=== As animator ===
- Animator and editor of the music video for Thodoris Triantafillou & CJ Jeff feat. Nomi Ruiz's cover of "Dirty Cash (Money Talks)" (2013)
- Art director, concept artist and storyboarder and of the music video for CJ Jeff (feat. Ellivia) "One Two Three" (2023)
- Art director, concept artist, storyboarder and editor of the music video for CJ Jeff (feat. Georges Perin) "Around" (2023)

== Discography ==
- Autodivine - EP. Jemma Press, 2009. ISBN 9789606732386
- Ghosts of Future Past - 4X84 EP. 2014.

== Works cited ==
- Nikolopoulos (Soloup), Antonis (2012). Τα ελληνικά Comics (Greek Comics). Topos Books. ISBN 978-960-499-048-1.
- Georgelos, G. (2011). Πρώτος Κατάλογος Ελληνικών Εκδόσεων Κόμικς: Από το 1939 έως το 2010 (First Catalogue of Greek Comics Publications: From 1939 until 2010). Esperos Comics. ISBN 978-90-73808-00-3.
