= Ion (chocolate) =

Greek confectionery company

ION S.A.
- Native name: ΙΟΝ Α.Ε.
- Type: Private company
- Industry: Chocolate and confectionery
- Founded: 1930
- Headquarters: Neo Faliro, Piraeus, Greece
- Key people: Spyros Theodoropoulos (vice-chair); Miltiadis Triantafyllou (CEO); Ioannis Kotsiopoulos (historical leader; died 2015)
- Products: Chocolate, wafers, candy bars, confectionery, cocoa powder and chocolate spreads
- Brands: ION Amigdalou, Chocofreta, Noisetta, Break, Derby, NuCrema
- Revenue: €209.13 million (2025; consolidated)
- Net income: €15.82 million (2025; consolidated)
- Number of employees: 711 (2024 annual average)
- Parent: Bespoke SGA Holdings
- Subsidiaries: Lavdas; Interion
- Website: www.ion.gr/en/

ION S.A. (Greek: ΙΟΝ Α.Ε.) is a Greek bean-to-bar chocolate and confectionery manufacturer headquartered in Neo Faliro, Piraeus. Founded in 1930, it makes chocolate, wafers, candy bars and other confectionery. Its products include ION Amigdalou, Chocofreta, Noisetta and Break. It operates production facilities in Neo Faliro, Arta and Markopoulo.

ION is controlled by Bespoke SGA Holdings. Its subsidiaries include Greek confectionery producer Lavdas and chocolate-spread producer Interion. In 2025, the ION group reported consolidated revenue of €209.13 million.

== History ==
ION was established in 1930 in Neo Faliro, on Piraeus Street, where its original chocolate factory remains. Its name derives from the ancient Greek ion, referring to the sweet violet used in the company’s emblem. An industrial heritage archive traces ION's origins to a chocolate workshop established by the Maroulis brothers in 1927, before the company's incorporation in 1930. In the 1930s, the Nasiopoulos and Kotsiopoulos families became involved with ION and established NASKO to produce confectionery. NASKO was later absorbed by ION.

Several products introduced during ION's post-war expansion became longstanding parts of the company's identity. In 1947, it launched ION Amigdalou, a milk-chocolate bar containing almonds; the almond branch depicted on its packaging subsequently became one of the company's most recognisable product designs. ION Serano, a milk-chocolate bar with a cocoa-cream filling, has been marketed since the 1960s and is described in contemporary coverage as one of ION's historic brands.

The company I. Kotsiopouloi Bros was established in 1956 to develop ION's sales and distribution network. In 1975, ION opened a wafer-production facility in Arta. This was followed by the introduction of Noisetta in 1976 and the chocolate-covered wafer Chokofreta in 1977. The Break chocolate range was introduced in 1986.

In 1988, Kraft Jacobs Suchard acquired a 24.5% stake in ION. The stake was subsequently bought back, returning ION to full ownership by its principal shareholders.

Ioannis Kotsiopoulos, who played a leading role in ION’s development, died in 2015. In 2022, Bespoke SGA Holdings, associated with businessman Spyros Theodoropoulos, acquired an initial stake in the company. Bespoke increased its holding to a majority stake in 2023. It held 66.1% by 2025.

== Products ==
ION produces chocolate bars, chocolate confectionery, cocoa powder, wafers and candy bars. Its longstanding products include ION Amigdalou, Noisetta and Chokofreta. Other brands and ranges include Break chocolate, Derby candy bars, ION Dark and ION Stevia.

ION introduced Chokofreta in 1977, two years after opening its wafer factory in Arta. The original product combines a crisp wafer with ION milk chocolate. The range has expanded to include hazelnut, dark chocolate and white chocolate varieties, as well as smaller “mini” versions. The Break range has expanded to include Dubai Style, a milk chocolate bar with pistachio filling and kataifi pastry that was available by early 2025. Strawberry and biscuit and speculoos biscuit varieties followed in 2025.

In 2026, ION collaborated with Greek rapper and songwriter LEX on a limited-edition bougatsa-flavoured Break bar called 2310.

Through its subsidiary Interion, the ION group also produces NuCrema, a range of cocoa, hazelnut and other sweet spreads sold to consumers and professional customers. ION also supplies professional customers with products for pastry-making and confectionery, including couverture chocolate and other ingredients.

== Production and investment ==
ION operates production facilities in Neo Faliro, Arta and Markopoulo, Attica. Neo Faliro plant produces chocolate bars and small chocolate confections; Arta produces wafers and candy bars; and Markopoulo produces seasonal chocolate products, including Easter eggs and Christmas confectionery. ION also processes cocoa beans into chocolate as part of its manufacturing operations.

ION is developing a new chocolate production facility in Stylida and modernising and expanding its Arta wafer plant. A new automated production line began operating at Arta during 2025. The Stylida project forms part of an investment programme being developed in phases through 2028.

Separately, ION subsidiary Lavdas is constructing a confectionery factory in Gastouni, with production lines planned for jellies, pastilles and hard sweets.

== See also ==
- List of bean-to-bar chocolate manufacturers
