= The Pirates of Coney Island =

- Cover of the first issue

Publication information
- Publisher: Image Comics
- Format: Limited series
- Genre: Action
- Publication date: October 2006 – December 2007
- No. of issues: 6 (8 planned)

Creative team
- Written by: Rick Spears
- Artist: Vasilis Lolos

The Pirates of Coney Island is an eight-issue comic book series published by Image Comics, first released in October 2006. It is written by Rick Spears and penciled and inked by Vasilis Lolos. The series has been on hiatus since 2007 with only six of the planned eight issues being released.

== Plot summary ==
Patch, a young runaway boy, stumbles his way into Coney Island, where he is met by the Cherries, an all-girl gang, who wants to mug him. As he tries to fight back, the leader of the gang cuts out his eye, and he is left unconscious. The next day he gets up and starts walking, but faints. He awakes in the apartment of a young man who has sewn him up and helped him. Patch then goes to pickpocket, but is nearly caught by the police, when he is saved by the Pirates, a Coney Island gang who boards cars and sells them.
