= Belzebubs =

Fictional black metal band

Belzebubs is a Finnish webcomic and fictional black metal band created by JP Ahonen.

== Summary ==
The webcomic centers around the daily lives of a family that has a stereotypical black metal aesthetic and the black metal band of Sløth, the family's father.

== History ==
The webcomic was first launched by JP Ahonen, a freelance illustrator from Finland, in 2016 after finding inspiration in a sketch he made for an Inktober challenge.

In 2019, a full-length album was released under the Belzebubs name, entitled Pantheon of the Nightside Gods. Produced by Century Media and Edge of Sanity vocalist Dan Swanö, the names of the participating musicians have not been officially released. That year, the first Belzebubs book was also published.

In 2020, Finnish animation studio Pyjama Films and Finnish public broadcaster Yle began making a TV series based on the webcomic. The series premiered on September 24, 2026 on Yle's streaming service Yle Areena in Finland.

On 15 February 2024, Ahonen and 3D animator Oscar Díaz Castillo released the "360° Hexperience", a crowdfunded Belzebubs concert set in virtual reality.

== Reception ==
The webcomic has received a positive reception, with some reviewers comparing it to Calvin and Hobbes. Comics Beat reviewer John Seven stated that the comic "is a bit like the Addams Family transposed into the 21st century with more current references."
