= East Coast Rising =

Post-apocalyptic graphic novel

East Coast Rising is an American comic book published as an original graphic novel by Tokyopop in 2006. It is both written and drawn by Eisner Award nominated artist Becky Cloonan. Done in the style of manga, the comic follows the adventures of punk rock pirates on the East Coast of the United States, in a world where New Jersey and New York City has become submerged.

== Volumes ==
- East Coast Rising Volume 1 (ISBN 1-59816-468-6; published April 30, 2006)
- East Coast Rising Volume 2 (on hold indefinitely)
