= Santa Catarina Hospital =

Private Hospital in São Paulo, Brazil

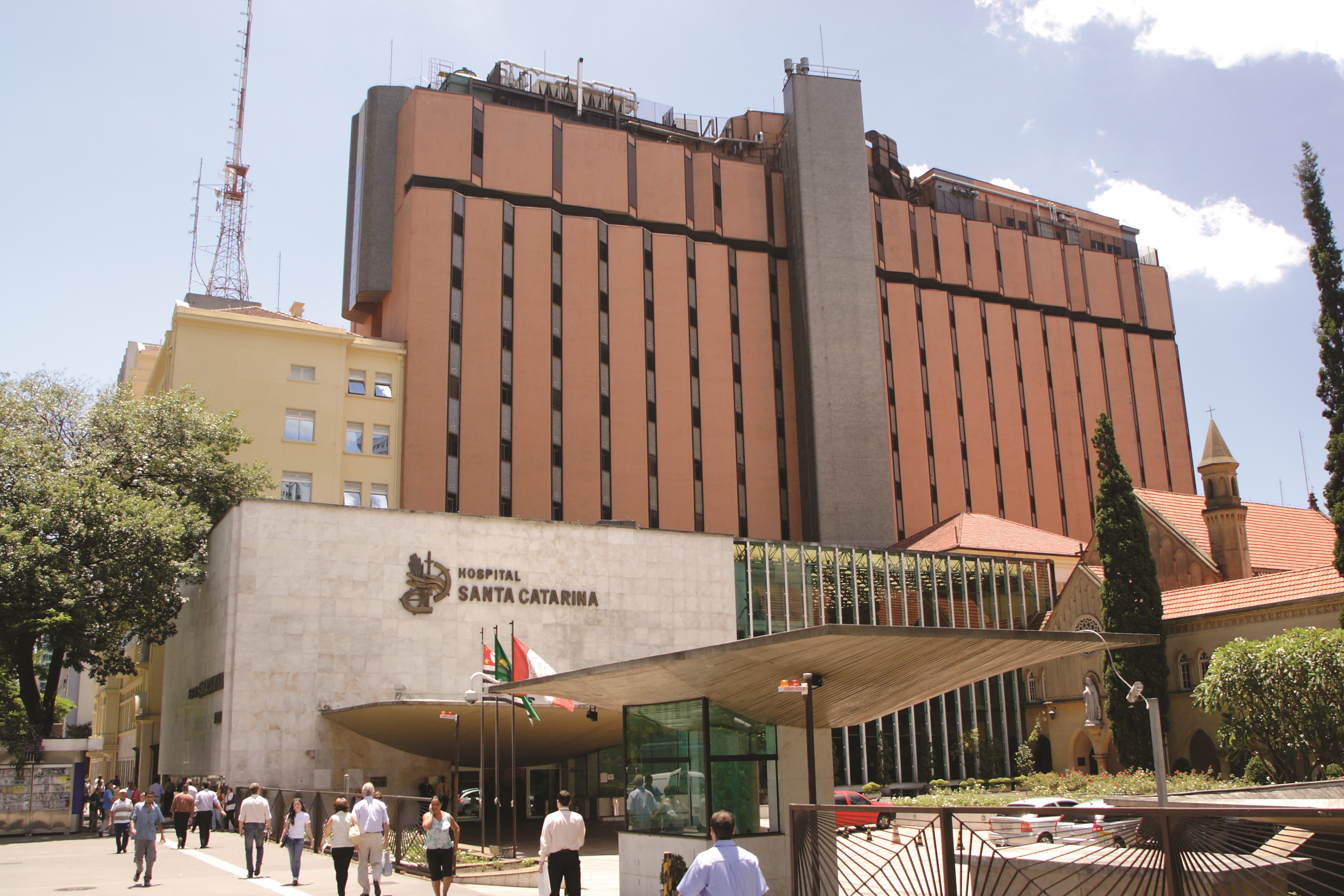
- Santa Catarina Hospital today.

Geography
- Location: São Paulo, SP; Brazil
- Coordinates: 23.5696834°S 46.6452771°W

Organisation
- Type: Private
- Patron: Santa Catarina Congregational Association (ACSC)

Services
- Emergency department: Yes
- Beds: 324 (2019): 239 for inpatient; 85 for ICU

History
- Opened: February 2, 1906

Links
- Website: redesantacatarina.org.br/hospital/santacatarina-paulista/

Santa Catarina Hospital is a private institution located on Paulista Avenue, in the city of São Paulo, Brazil. It was founded in 1906 and is maintained by the Santa Catarina Congregation Association, a philanthropic entity that also operates in the states of Rio de Janeiro, Espírito Santo, Mato Grosso, and Rio Grande do Sul.

== History ==
=== Background ===
In 1897, the Heinrich sisters arrived in Brazil to educate the children of German settlers in the country. After participating in the foundation of a school and the Santa Tereza Hospital in Petrópolis, and the Holy House of Juiz de Fora, they went to São Paulo to help the Congregation of the Sisters of Saint Catherine of Alexandria, Virgin and Martyr to establish an ambulatory to attend the demand of sick people who sought the institution. With the support of Friar Dom Miguel Kruse (1864-1929), abbot of the St Benedict's Monastery, Sister Maria Beata Heinrich (1867-1941) founded a service to assist the sick in 1903.

=== Santa Catarina Sanatorium and Hospital ===
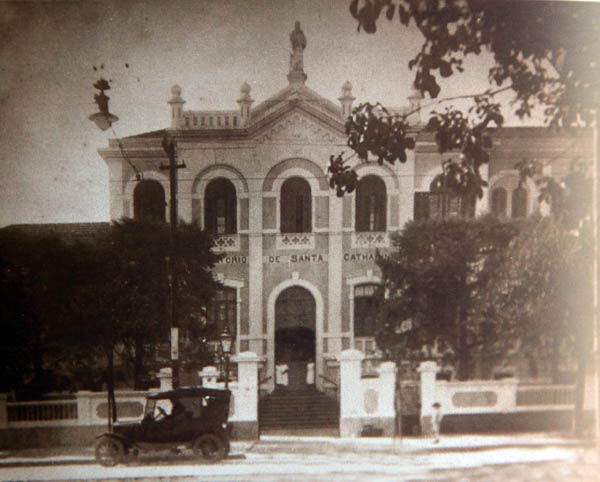
The hospital's first facilities, 1906.

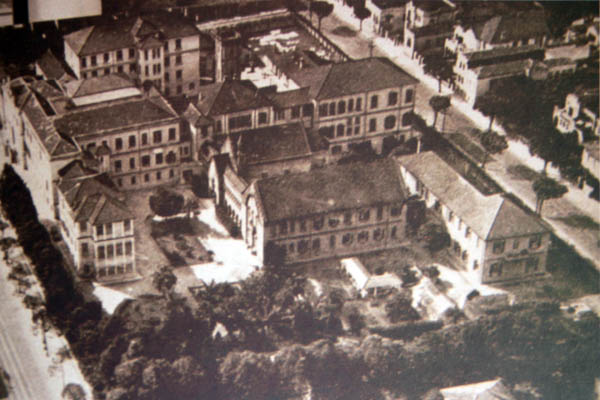
The hospital complex in 1934.

Due to the growth in the number of patients, Sister Heinrich turned to Father Kruse, who got the support of the Austrian physician Walter Seng (1873-1931) and, together, they contacted the president of the state of São Paulo, Jorge Tibiriçá, and presented the project of a sanatorium (hospital) to attend the increasing number of sick people who were seeking treatment. Jorge Tibiriçá accepted the idea and donated a public area on Paulista Avenue for the upcoming building. German architect Maximilian Emil Hehl (1861-1916) was hired to design the hospital, submitting the project in 1904. The works were started at that year and the Santa Catarina Sanatorium was inaugurated at 3pm on February 2, 1906.

In a short time, the sanatorium became (along with Humberto I) one of the most frequented hospitals in the city of São Paulo, due to its privileged location on Paulista Avenue. The influx of patients pushed the first phase of expansion of the hospital complex. In 1906, there were only 40 hospital beds, but the inauguration of a new two-story building in 1913 allowed the expansion of beds to 104, along with the creation of two new wards. The Chapel (1920), the Dressing Room (1925), the Surgical Center, the X-Ray Laboratory, the Pharmacy and the Emergency Room were inaugurated between 1919 and 1934 for the poor, with the last one installed in a three-story building on Teixeira da Silva Street (1934). It was one of the hospitals requested to attend to the wounded during the São Paulo Revolt of 1924 and the Constitutionalist Revolution of 1932. In the latter, the hospital was transformed into the headquarters of General Bertoldo Klinger.

In the 1940s, the older facilities began to exhibit limitations and problems in dealing with the increasing demand for patients, leading the hospital management to launch a project to build new facilities for the complex, composed of blocks. Therefore, the main building inaugurated in 1906 was demolished and in its place was built a seven-story block (Block B), which opened in 1949. The hospital administration was transferred to a new five-story block (Block E), built on Cincinato Braga Street in 1954, and in 1968 a new expansion took place, with the construction of two eight-story buildings (including a new maternity ward), whose design was given to the architects Adolpho Rubio Morales and Fábio Kok de Sá Moreira. Part of these facilities was completed in 1977 and the remaining works in 1981.

In 1973, the name of the complex changed from Sanatorium to Santa Catarina Hospital. Currently it has 324 hospital beds (85 of which in ICU), an Emergency Room, a 16-room surgical center, ICUs specialized in cardiology, general and multidisciplinary, neurology and pediatrics.

== Clinical directors ==
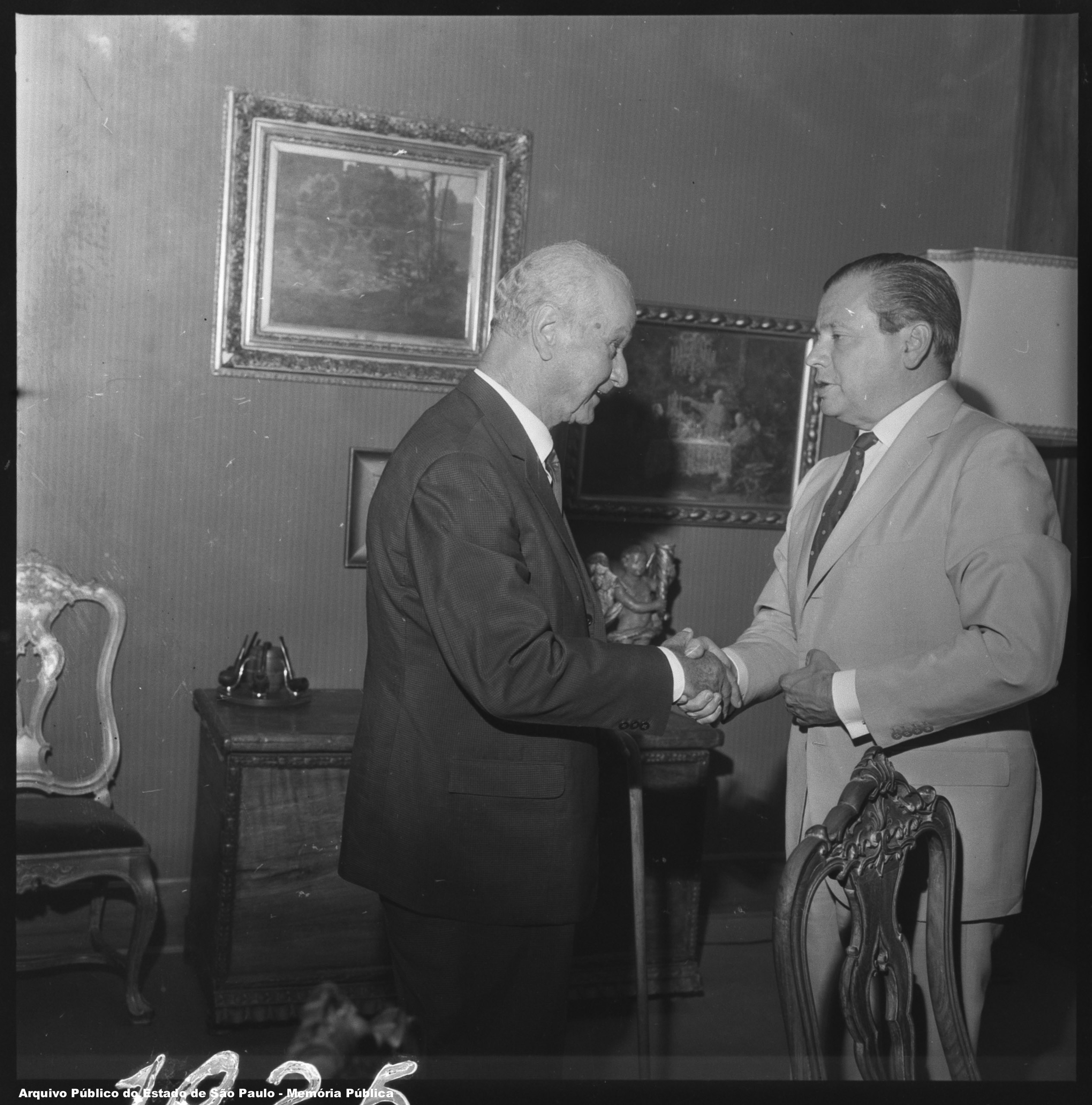
Benedito Montenegro (left, in 1969, with Governor Abreu Sodré) was the physician who held the Hospital's Clinical Director chair for the longest time, between 1932 and 1969.

- Walter Seng (1906-1930)
- João Alves de Lima (1930-1932)
- Benedito Montenegro (1932-1969)
- Décio Pacheco Pedroso (1969-1981)
- Eurico da Silva Bastos (1981-1989)
- Rawf Amâncio (1989)
- Rui Raul Dahas de Carvalho (1989-1992)
- Fábio Schmidt Goffi (1992-1995)
- Rafael Sanches (1999-2010)
- Carlos Borsatto (2010-)

== Museum ==
On March 18, 1993, the hospital inaugurated a small museum with pieces of its history. The Historical Collection Sister Beata Heinrich is officially listed in the Brazilian Institute of Museums.
