= Head Lopper =

Comic book series by Andrew MacLean

- Head Lopper #1, 2013

Publication information
- Publisher: Self-published (2013–2014); Image Comics (2015–present)
- Schedule: Quarterly (2015–2021); Semi-annual (2026–present)
- Format: Ongoing series of miniseries
- Genre: Fantasy
- Publication date: June 7, 2013 – present
- No. of issues: 3 (self-published); 17 (Image Comics)

Creative team
- Created by: Andrew MacLean
- Written by: Andrew MacLean
- Artist: Andrew MacLean
- Letterer(s): Andrew MacLean #1–present Erin MacLean #6–present
- Colorist(s): Mike Spicer #1–4; Andrew MacLean #1; Jordie Bellaire #5–present
- Editor: Erin MacLean #9–present

Collected editions
- The Island or A Plague of Beasts: ISBN 9781632158864
- The Crimson Tower: ISBN 9781534305083
- The Knights of Venora: ISBN 9781534313330
- The Quest for Mulgrid's Stair: ISBN 9781534319127

Head Lopper is a comic book series created by writer and artist Andrew MacLean, currently published by Image Comics. The story follows the exploits of the Viking warrior Norgal (or "Head Lopper", as some call him) and the severed head of Agatha the Blue Witch.

== Publishing history ==
Head Lopper originally began as a self-published project by comics creator Andrew MacLean. In 2015 it was picked up for a four-issue miniseries.

The character originated from a piece for Brand New Nostalgia. The theme of the week had been Vikings, and a bearded warrior with a witch's head skewered on his sword was the result.

=== Self-published issues ===
Head Lopper #1 debuted at Heroes Con 2013. The first issue was a small print run and thus costly to produce. The second issue was funded via a Kickstarter campaign launched October 10, 2013.

In September 2024, between the fourth and fifth arcs of the series, MacLean returned to self-publishing via Kickstarter for a one-shot issue sidestory, Agatha: A Tale of Three Witches.

Story arc	Issue	Release date	Chapter	Writer	Artist	Colorist	Cover Artist	Extras
The Island	#1	June 7, 2013	Blood and Water	Andrew MacLean		Mike Spicer	Andrew MacLean	PINUPS: Toby Cypress; Brian Churilla; Tradd Moore; Warwick Johnson-Cadwell; James Harren
The Island	#2	June 29, 2014	The Wolves of Barra	Andrew MacLean		Mike Spicer	Andrew MacLean	PINUPS: Mike Mignola and Dave Stewart; Joe Dellagatta; Michael Avon Oeming; Simone D'Armini; Max Fiumara; Troy Nixey; Fillip Acovic; Enrique Fernandez; Paul Maybury; Janusz Pawlak
Agatha: A Tale of Three Witches		January 2025	—N/a	Andrew MacLean				

=== Image Comics issues ===
In 2015 Image Comics picked up Head Lopper as a "quarterly adventure comic". The series eschewed the industry standard 22-page monthly issues in favor of a larger issues published quarterly.

… I've decide to release the HEAD LOPPER comic on a quarterly basis because I think a longer book can make a better book. Here's what I want in every issue of HEAD LOPPER: long fights, dark jokes, creepy atmosphere, short plots and long plots, and comfortable conclusions that, hopefully, still leave you wanting more. The standard comic length would make me cut something short.

I'll be able to make it the story I want if i take more pages to tell it, maybe fifty to sixty pages per issue, cover to cover. But I can't pull off that big of an issue on a monthly schedule. So… QUARTERLY! It's for the better…

— Andrew MacLean, author's afterword from Head Lopper #1, September 2015

In April 2016 MacLean announced on various social media channels that Image Comics had picked up Head Lopper for another miniseries in 2017.

In 2026, when the series returned after a nearly five-year absence, the numbering was reset to #1, although the original cover art in the solicitations had it as #17.

Story arc	Issue	Release date	Chapter	Writer	Artist	Colorist	Cover Artist	Extras
The Island	#1	September 9, 2015	Blood and Water	Andrew MacLean		Mike Spicer	Andrew MacLean; Rafael Grampá (variant)	PINUPS: Zé Burnay; Adam Miller; Alexis Ziritt; MacKenzie Schubert; Lamar Mathurin
The Island	#1	September 9, 2015	The Wolves of Barra	Andrew MacLean		Mike Spicer	Andrew MacLean; Rafael Grampá (variant)	PINUPS: Zé Burnay; Adam Miller; Alexis Ziritt; MacKenzie Schubert; Lamar Mathurin
The Island	#1	September 9, 2015	That Which Lurks in the Mist	Andrew MacLean			Andrew MacLean; Rafael Grampá (variant)	PINUPS: Zé Burnay; Adam Miller; Alexis Ziritt; MacKenzie Schubert; Lamar Mathurin
The Island	#2	December 9, 2015	Into the Silent Wood	Andrew MacLean		Mike Spicer	Andrew MacLean; Mike and Laura Allred (variant)	PINUPS: Aaron Conley; Stephen Green; Scarecrowoven; Matt Smith
The Island	#3	March 9, 2016	The Sisters of the Hill	Andrew MacLean		Mike Spicer	Andrew MacLean; James Stokoe (variant)	PINUPS: Skottie Young; Rebecca Kirby; James Callahan
The Island	#4	June 8, 2016	The Black Bog	Andrew MacLean		Mike Spicer	Andrew MacLean; Gabriel Bá (variant)	PINUPS: J.B. Roe; Mike Rooth; Mike Spicer; Andy Suriano; Ben Templesmith
The Island	Epilogue (TPB)		Return to Castlebay	Andrew MacLean		Lin Visel & Joseph Nergin III	—N/a	—N/a
The Crimson Tower	#5	March 15, 2017	In the Shadow of the Tower	Andrew MacLean		Jordie Bellaire	Andrew MacLean; Tony Sandoval (variant)	PINUPS: Marcus Georgiou; Nicole Goux; Paul Maybury; Victor Santos
The Crimson Tower	#6	June 21, 2017	Quest for the Crystal Eyes	Andrew MacLean		Jordie Bellaire	Andrew MacLean; Benjamin Marra (variant)	PINUPS: Austin James; Daniel White; Derick Jones; J.M. Dragunas; Justine Jones; Tom Hunter
The Crimson Tower	#7	September 20, 2017	Deeper into the Strange	Andrew MacLean		Jordie Bellaire	Andrew MacLean; Nathan Fairbain and Ryan Ottley (variant)	PINUPS: Christine Larsen; Gerardo Zaffino; Shane Hillman
The Crimson Tower	#8	December 20, 2017 (printing error) January 10, 2018 (corrected printing)	Gladiators	Andrew MacLean		Jordie Bellaire	Andrew MacLean; Skinner and Alexis Ziritt (variant)	PINUPS: Cliff Rathburn; Jason Fischer; Jeffrey Alan Love; Kyle Meyerdierks; Luke Parker; Sean Kiernan
The Crimson Tower	Epilogue (TPB)		In the Shadow of the Tower: Part Two	Andrew MacLean		Jordie Bellaire	—N/a	—N/a
The Knights of Venora	#9	September 12, 2018	Norgal Has a Talking Basket	Andrew MacLean		Jordie Bellaire	Andrew MacLean; Alan Brown (variant)	—N/a
The Knights of Venora	#10	December 12, 2018	From the Lips of Venora	Andrew MacLean		Jordie Bellaire	Andrew MacLean; Jeanne D'Angelo (variant)	PINUPS: Skam 2 Shadia Amin; Ainsley Sturko; Luca Vassallo; Matt Lesniewski; Chris Faccone; Diman Kaiman; Fran P. Lobato
The Knights of Venora	#11	March 13, 2019	Send the Wizards	Andrew MacLean		Jordie Bellaire	Andrew MacLean; Al Gofa (variant)	PINUPS: Cam Shepler; Chad Lewis; Demetrius Dawkins; Nerdgore; Zach Cunningham
The Knights of Venora	#12	June 26, 2019	The Last Time I Saw Him He Was Covered in Blood	Andrew MacLean		Jordie Bellaire	Andrew MacLean; Matthew Allison (variant)	—N/a
The Knights of Venora	Epilogue (TPB)			Andrew MacLean		Jordie Bellaire	—N/a	—N/a
The Quest for Mulgrid's Stair	#13	September 16, 2020	The Executioner	Andrew MacLean		Jordie Bellaire	Andrew MacLean; Daniel Warren Johnson (variant)	—N/a
The Quest for Mulgrid's Stair	#14	December 16, 2020	The Gorgon	Andrew MacLean		Jordie Bellaire	Andrew MacLean; Tradd Moore (variant)	—N/a
The Quest for Mulgrid's Stair	#15	March 17, 2021	The Mines of Martan	Andrew MacLean		Jordie Bellaire	Andrew MacLean; Dennis Brown (variant)	—N/a
The Quest for Mulgrid's Stair	#16	July 28, 2021	Of Climbing and Falling	Andrew MacLean		Jordie Bellaire	Andrew MacLean; Dani (variant)	—N/a
The Heart of the Godbeast	#1	April 22, 2026	By the Strings on Death's Lute or 10 Days Since Tarf was Shot in the Stomach	Andrew MacLean		Jordie Bellaire	Andrew MacLean; James Harren (variant)	PREVIEW: Agatha: A Tale of Three Witches
The Heart of the Godbeast	#2	TBD		Andrew MacLean		Jordie Bellaire		
The Heart of the Godbeast	#3	TBD		Andrew MacLean		Jordie Bellaire		
The Heart of the Godbeast	#4	TBD		Andrew MacLean		Jordie Bellaire		

=== Crossover ===
In October 2019, Norgal and Agatha appeared in two short stories in Rumble Vol. 2 #17. The first, "Belly of Hell", was drawn by Andrew MacLean and the second, "Deceitful Above All Things", was drawn by James Harren. Both stories were written by John Arcudi. The events of these stories are in continuity and referenced in Head Lopper #16. These stories were collected in Rumble – Volume 6: Last Knight and Head Lopper & the Quest for Mulgrid's Stair.

=== Collections ===
Volume	Title	Release date	Collects	Extras	ISBN
1	Head Lopper & The Island or A Plague of Beasts	October 5, 2016	Head Lopper #1–4	Epilogue; 5-page Sketchbook; Pinup Gallery; Cover Gallery	9781632158864
2	Head Lopper & The Crimson Tower	April 4, 2018	Head Lopper #5–8	Epilogue; 7-page Sketchbook; Cover Gallery	9781534305083
3	Head Lopper & The Knights of Venora	September 18, 2019	Head Lopper #9–12	Epilogue; 11-page Sketchbook; Cover Gallery	9781534313330
4	Head Lopper & The Quest for Mulgrid's Stair	September 22, 2021	Head Lopper #13–16; "Belly of Hell"; "Deceitful Above All Things"	7-page Sketchbook; Cover Gallery	9781534319127

== Premise ==
The series follows the adventures of the legendary swordsman Norgal, dubbed the Head Lopper, and his companion, the severed head of Agatha the Blue Witch, as they trek across the realm to fulfill their quests, uncovering mysteries whilst encountering friends and foes along the way.

== Reception ==
The Kickstarter for the self-published Head Lopper 2: The Wolves of Barra was funded with only 544 backers, but strong word of mouth and reviews led to the series being picked up by Image Comics. The Image Comics incarnation of Head Lopper has had strong reviews since its debut, with MacLean's artwork and sense of humor and Bellaire's coloring receiving consistently high praise.

Issue	Review average	Reviews
#1	9.0	10
#2	9.0	4
#3	10	4
#4	9.2	5
#5	9.3	5
#6	9.4	4
#7	9	3
#8	9.1	1
#9	8.7	3
#10	6	1
#11	8.9	3
#12	8.9	4
#13	8.9	4
#14	8.6	3
#15	9.1	3
#16	9	2
