= Gabriel Bá =

Brazilian comic book artist (born 1976)

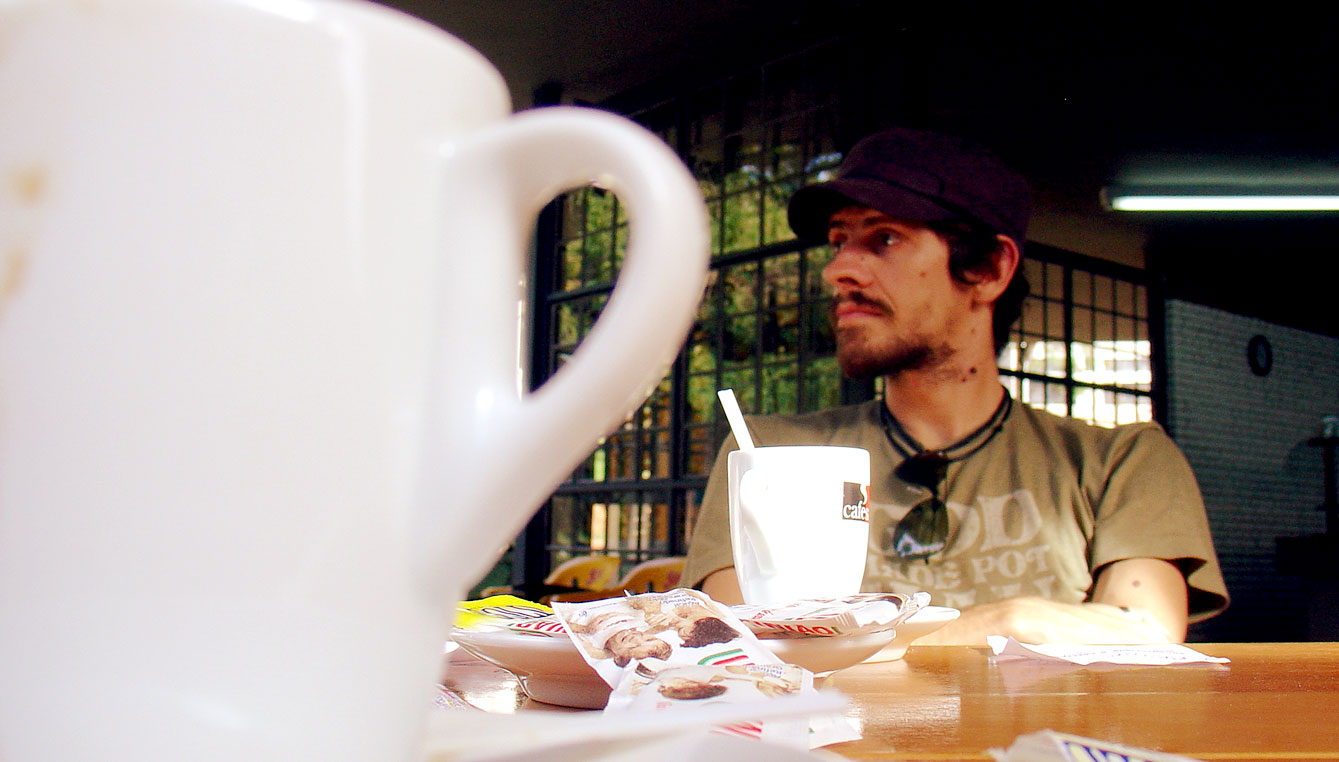
- Born: June 5, 1976 (age 50) São Paulo, Brazil
- Area: Artist
- Notable works: The Umbrella Academy; Casanova; Daytripper
- Awards: Eisner Award

Gabriel Bá (born 5 June 1976) is a Brazilian comic book artist best known for his work on The Umbrella Academy, Casanova, and Daytripper. He is the twin brother of fellow comic book artist Fábio Moon.

== Career ==
Gabriel Bá has been writing comics since the 1990s, and has been published in France, Italy, Spain, the US, and Brazil. He began self-publishing comics with his twin brother in 1993; their first mini-series, "Sunflower and the Moon", from 1997 was released by a Brazilian publisher as a graphic novel in 2000.

They published in the United States for the first time in 1999, with the mini-series ROLAND – days of wrath, written and self-published by Shane Amaya. In the US, they have contributed on the Dark Horse anthology Autobiographix, published in 2003, alongside such comic book greats as Frank Miller and Will Eisner.

Their independent comic book ROCK'n'ROLL was picked up by Image Comics and published in November 2005.

In 2006, they released De:TALES with Dark Horse, elected by Booklist as one of the 10 best Graphic Novels of that year and nominated for an Eisner Award for Best U.S. Edition of International Material. Bá was the artist for Matt Fraction's Casanova, published by Image Comics.

In 2007, Bá worked on The Umbrella Academy with writer Gerard Way, which was published by Dark Horse, and his brother Fábio Moon took over the art on Casanova.

In 2008, Bá self-published PIXU, a horror comics anthology, with Fabio Moon, Becky Cloonan and Vasilis Lolos.

== Bibliography ==
- Gunned Down: "Indian Face" (with Shane Amaya, anthology, Terra Major, July 2005)
- Casanova #1–7 (with Matt Fraction, ongoing series, Image Comics, June 2006 – February 2007)
- Becky (script and art, in 5, self-published, 2007)
- PIXU (with Becky Cloonan, Vasilis Lolos, and Fábio Moon, 2-issue mini-series comics anthology, self-published, July–November 2008, hardcover, PIXU: The Mark of Evil, Dark Horse Comics, July 2009, ISBN 1-59582-340-9)
- The Umbrella Academy: Apocalypse Suite (with Gerard Way, 6-issue limited series, Dark Horse, September 2007 – February 2008)
- The Umbrella Academy: Dallas (with Gerard Way, 6-issue limited series, Dark Horse, November 2008 – April 2009)
- B.P.R.D.: 1947 (with Fábio Moon; #s 1–5, 2009–2010; collected: July 20, 2010, ISBN 978-1-59582-478-3)
- Daytripper (with Fábio Moon, 10-issue limited series, Vertigo Comics, February–November 2010)
- Two Brothers (with Fábio Moon, based on a novel by Milton Hatoum, hardcover, Dark Horse 2015, ISBN 978-1616558567)
- Ursula (with Fábio Moon, softcover, AIT/Planetlar 2004, ISBN 978-1932051223)
- The Umbrella Academy: Hotel Oblivion (with Gerard Way, 6-issue limited series, Dark Horse, October 2018 – June 2019)
- "I Hate Gert!" by (with Fábio Moon, based on I Hate Fairyland: Good Girl by Skottie Young, Substack 2021)
- The Umbrella Academy: Sparrow Academy (with Gerard Way, 6-issue limited series, Dark Horse)

== Television ==
- The Umbrella Academy – executive producer, writer (2019)

== Awards ==
At the 2008 Eisner Awards, The Umbrella Academy won for "Best Limited Series" and 5 won for "Best Anthology".

De:TALES was nominated for the 2007 Eisner Award for "Best U.S. Edition of International Material".

Bá is nominated for two 2009 Eisner Awards in the categories "Best Penciller/Inker" and "Best Cover Artist". The Deluxe Edition of The Umbrella Academy is nominated for "Best Graphic Album — Reprint".

PIXU was nominated for the 2009 "Best Anthology" Harvey Award.

Daytripper (with Fabio Moon) won the Best limited series Eisner Prize in 2011.
