= Fábio Moon =

Brazilian comic book artist (born 1976)

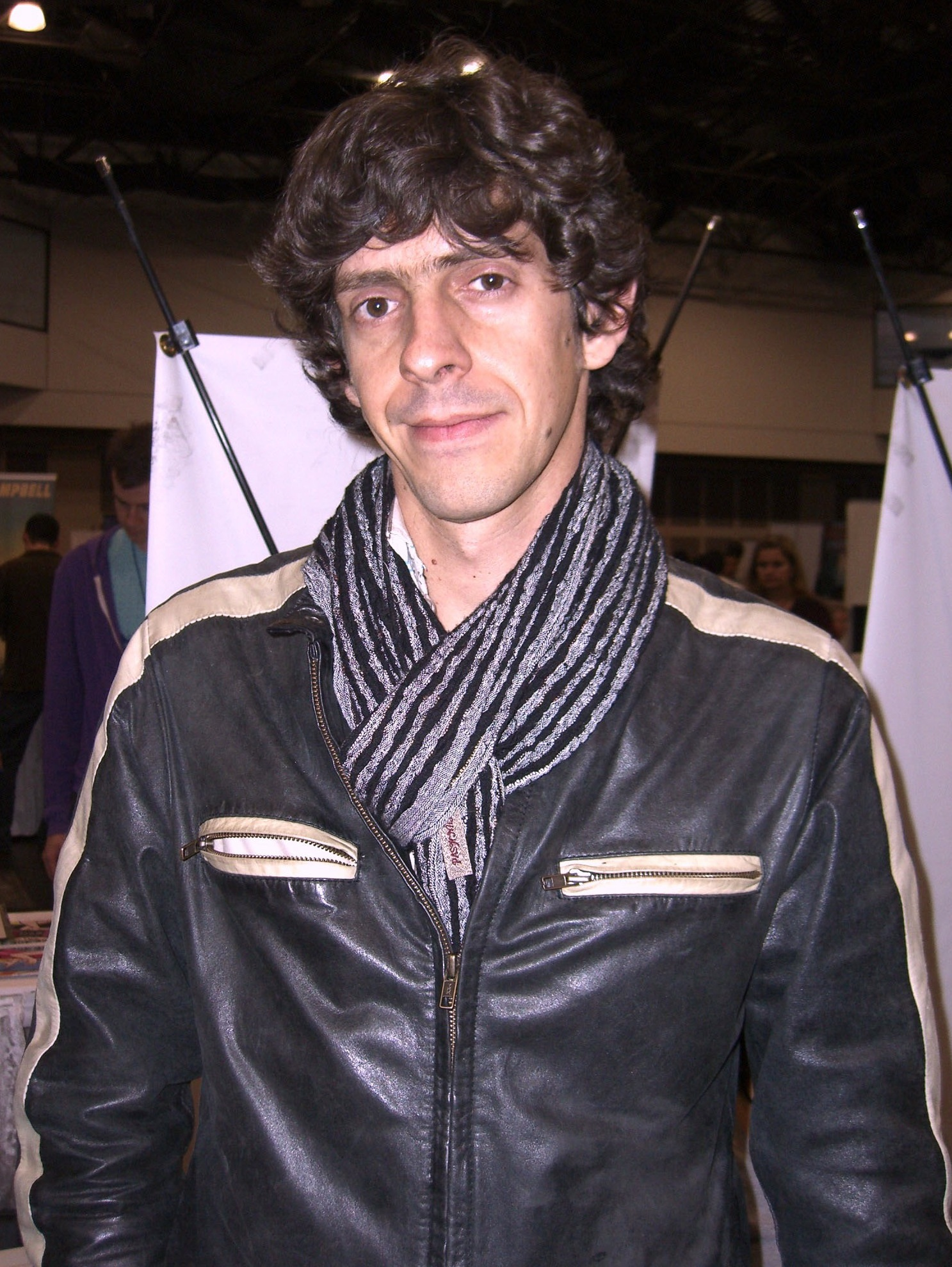
- Moon at the New York Comic Con in Manhattan, October 10, 2010.
- Born: June 5, 1976 (age 50) São Paulo, Brazil
- Area: Artist
- Notable works: Casanova
- Awards: Eisner Award

Fábio Moon is a Brazilian comic book artist best known for his work on Casanova. He is the twin brother of fellow comic book artist Gabriel Bá.

== Career ==
Fábio Moon has been writing comics for almost 15 years, and has been published in France, Italy, Spain, the US, and Brazil. He began self-publishing comics with his brother in 1993; their first mini-series, "Sunflower and the Moon", from 1997 was released by a Brazilian publisher as a graphic novel in 2000.

They published in the United States for the first time in 1999, with the mini-series ROLAND - days of wrath, written and self-published by Shane Amaya. In the US, they have contributed on the Dark Horse anthology Autobiographix, published in 2003, alongside such comic book greats as Frank Miller and Will Eisner.

Their independent comic book ROCK'n'ROLL was picked up by Image Comics and published in November 2005.

In 2006, they released De:TALES with Dark Horse, elected by Booklist as one of the 10 best Graphic Novels of that year and nominated for an Eisner Award for Best U.S. Edition of International Material.

In 2007, Moon took over the art on Casanova from his brother.

In 2008, Bá self-published PIXU, a horror comics anthology, with Moon, Becky Cloonan and Vasilis Lolos.

== Bibliography ==
- "Vasilis" (script and art, in 5, self-published, 2007)
- Casanova #8-14 (with Matt Fraction, ongoing series, Image Comics, August 2007 - May 2008)
- PIXU (with Becky Cloonan, Vasilis Lolos, and Gabriel Bá, 2-issue mini-series comics anthology, self-published, July–November 2008, hardcover, PIXU: The Mark of Evil, Dark Horse Comics, July 2009, ISBN 1-59582-340-9)
- Daytripper #1-10 (with Gabriel Bá, 10-issue limited series, Vertigo Comics, February–November 2010)
- B.P.R.D.: 1947 (with Gabriel Bá; #s 1–5, 2009–2010; collected: July 20, 2010, ISBN 978-1-59582-478-3)
- Serenity: Firefly Class 03-K64 (written by Zack Whedon; May 5, 2012)
- Two Brothers (with Gabriel Bá, based on a novel by Milton Hatoum, hardcover, Dark Horse 2015, ISBN 978-1616558567)
- "Ursula" (with Gabriel Bá, softcover from AIT/Planetlar 2004, ISBN 978-1932051223)
- "I Hate Gert!" by (with Gabriel Bá, based on I Hate Fairyland: Good Girl by Skottie Young, Substack 2021)

== Awards ==
At the 2008 Eisner Awards, 5 won for Best Anthology. and Sugarshock won for Best Digital Comic.

De:TALES was nominated for the 2007 Eisner Award for Best U.S. Edition of International Material.

PIXU was nominated for the 2009 Harvey Award for Best Anthology.

Daytripper (with Gabriel Bá) won the Best limited series Will Eisner Prize in 2011.
