= Eisner Award for Best Anthology =

Creative achievement award for comics

- Awarded for: Best Anthology
- Country: United States
- First award: 1992
- Most recent winner: DC Pride 2025, edited by Andrea Shea and Jillian Grant
- Website: www.comic-con.org/awards/eisner-awards-current-info

The Eisner Award for Best Anthology is an award for "creative achievement" in American comic books. It has been given out every year since 1992.

== Winners and nominees ==
Eisner Award for Best Anthology winners and nominees
Year	Title	Author(s)/Editor(s)	Publisher	Result	Ref.
1990s
1992	Dark Horse Presents	Randy Stradley (ed.)	Dark Horse Comics	Winner	
1992	Taboo #5	Stephen R. Bissette and others (eds.)	Spiderbaby Grafix/Tundra Publishing	Nominee	
1992	A1 #5	Dave Elliott and Gary Leach (eds.)	Atomeka Press	Nominee	
1992	Twisted Sisters	Diane Noomin (ed.)	Penguin Books	Nominee	
1992	Raw vol. 2, #3	Art Spiegelman and Françoise Mouly (eds.)	Raw Books/Penguin Books	Nominee	
1993	Taboo	Stephen R. Bissette (ed.)	Spiderbaby Grafix/Tundra Publishing	Winner	
1993	Real Stuff	Dennis Eichhorn (ed.)	Fantagraphics	Nominee	
1993	Rubber Blanket	David Mazzucchelli and Richmond Lewis (eds.)	Rubber Blanket Press	Nominee	
1993	Drawn & Quarterly	Chris Oliveros (ed.)	Drawn & Quarterly	Nominee	
1993	The Ray Bradbury Chronicles	Byron Preiss (ed.)	Bantam Books	Nominee	
1993	The Residents: Freak Show	Jerry Prosser and Rich Shupe (eds.)	Dark Horse Comics	Nominee	
1994	Dark Horse Presents	Randy Stradley (ed.)	Dark Horse Comics	Winner	
1994	Vertigo Comics Jam	Karen Berger (ed.)	DC Comics/Vertigo Comics	Nominee	
1994	Real Stuff	Dennis Eichhorn (ed.)	Fantagraphics	Nominee	
1994	Andrew Vachss' Hard Looks	Jerry Prosser (ed.)	Dark Horse Comics	Nominee	
1994	Ray Bradury Comics	Howard Zimmerman (ed.)	Topps Comics	Nominee	
1995	Big Book of Urban Legends	Andy Helfer (ed.)	Paradox Press	Winner	
1995	Twisted Sisters	Diane Noomin (ed.)	Kitchen Sink Press	Nominee	
1995	Drawn & Quarterly	Chris Oliveros (ed.)	Drawn & Quarterly	Nominee	
1995	Dark Horse Presents	Randy Stradley and Bob Schreck (eds.)	Dark Horse Comics	Nominee	
1996	Big Book of Conspiracies	Bronwyn Taggart (ed.)	Paradox Press	Winner	
1996	BLAB! #8	Monte Beauchamp (ed.)	Kitchen Sink Press	Nominee	
1996	Weird Business	Joe R. Lansdale and Richard Klaw (eds.)	Mojo Press	Nominee	
1996	Drawn & Quarterly	Chris Oliveros (ed.)	Drawn & Quarterly	Nominee	
1996	Zero Zero	Kim Thompson (ed.)	Fantagraphics	Nominee	
1997	Batman Black and White	Mark Chiarello and Scott Peterson (eds.)	DC Comics	Winner	
1997	Shi: Kaidan	Tony Bedard (ed.), by Peter Gutierrez and various artists	Crusade Comics	Nominee	
1997	Big Book of Hoaxes	Jim Higgins (ed.), by Carl Sifakis and various artists	Paradox Press	Nominee	
1997	Negative Burn	Joe Pruett (ed.)	Caliber Comics	Nominee	
1997	A Decade of Dark Horse Comics	Randy Stradley (ed.)	Dark Horse Comics	Nominee	
1998	Hellboy Christmas Special	Scott Allie (ed.)	Dark Horse Comics	Winner	
1998	BLAB! #9	Monte Beauchamp (ed.)	Fantagraphics	Nominee	
1998	Mind Riot	Karen Hirsch (ed.)	Simon & Schuster/Aladdin Paperbacks	Nominee	
1998	Two-Fisted Science	Jim Ottaviani (ed.)	G.T. Labs	Nominee	
1998	Vertigo Comics: Winters Edge	Shelly Roeberg (ed.)	DC Comics/Vertigo Comics	Nominee	
1998	Zero Zero	Kim Thompson (ed.)	Fantagraphics	Nominee	
1999	Grendel: Black, White and Red & Red, White and Black	Diana Schutz (ed.), by Matt Wagner	Dark Horse Comics	Winner	
1999	Big Book of Bad	Andy Helfe Kirchner, Steve Vance, and Anina Bennett	Paradox Press/DC Comics	Nominee	
1999	Negative Burn #50	Joe Pruett (ed.)	Caliber Comics	Nominee	
1999	Oni Double Feature	Bob Schreck (ed.)	Oni Press	Nominee	
1999	Trilogy Tour II Book	Jeff Smith, Mark Crilley, Linda Medley, Stan Sakai, Jill Thompson, and Charles Vess	Cartoon Books	Nominee	
2000s
2000	Tomorrow Stories	Scott Dunbier (ed.), by Alan Moore, Rick Veitch, Kevin Nowlan, Melinda Gebbie, and Jim Baikie	America's Best Comics	Winner	
2000	BLAB!	Monte Beauchamp (ed.)	Fantagraphics	Nominee	
2000	Brainbomb	Brian Clopper (ed.)	Behemoth Books	Nominee	
2000	Jet Lag	Etgar Keret, Mira Friedmann, Batia Kolton, Rutu Modan, Yirmi Pinkus, and Itzik Rennert	Actus Tragicus	Nominee	
2000	Comix 2000	Jean-Christophe Menu (ed.)	L'Association	Nominee	
2000	Dignifying Science	Jim Ottaviani (ed.)	G.T. Labs	Nominee	
2001	Drawn & Quarterly, vol. 3	Chris Oliveros (ed.)	Drawn & Quarterly	Winner	
2001	Streetwise	Jon B. Cooke and John Morrow (eds.)	TwoMorrows Publishing	Nominee	
2001	Strapazin: Bubbles 'n' Boxes and Beyond	Patrizia Crivelli and others (eds.)	Swiss Institute of New York/Swiss Federal Office of Culture	Nominee	
2001	Expo 2000	Tom Devlin and others (eds.)	Small Press Expo	Nominee	
2001	Little Lit	Art Spiegelman and Françoise Mouly (eds.)	HarperCollins	Nominee	
2002	Bizarro Comics	Joey Cavalieri (ed.)	DC Comics	Winner	
2002	Comics Journal Winter Special 2002	Gary Groth and Anne Elizabeth Moore (eds.)	Fantagraphics	Nominee	
2002	Drawn & Quarterly, vol. 4	Chris Oliveros (ed.)	Drawn & Quarterly	Nominee	
2002	Oni Press Summer Color Special 2001	Jamie S. Rich (ed.)	Oni Comics	Nominee	
2002	Little Lit: Strange Stories for Strange Kids	Art Spiegelman and Françoise Mouly (eds.)	HarperCollins	Nominee	
2003	SPX 2002		CBLDF	Winner	
2003	Orchid	Ben Catmull and Dylan Williams (eds.)	Sparkplug Comics	Nominee	
2003	Super Manga Blast!	Tim Ervin-Gore (ed.)	Dark Horse Comics	Nominee	
2003	Rosetta: A Comics Anthology	Ng Suat Tong (ed.)	Alternative Comics	Nominee	
2004	The Sandman: Endless Nights	Karen Berger and Shelly Bond (eds.), by Neil Gaiman, Dave McKean, P. Craig Russell, Miguelanxo Prado, Barron Storey, Frank Quitely, Glenn Fabry, Milo Manara, and Bill Sienkiewicz	Vertigo Comics/DC Comics	Winner	
2004	The Dark Horse Book of Hauntings	Scott Allie (ed.)	Dark Horse Comics	Nominee	
2004	Drawn & Quarterly, vol. 5	Chris Oliveros (ed.)	Drawn & Quarterly	Nominee	
2004	Project: Telstar	Chris Pitzer (ed.)	AdHouse Books	Nominee	
2004	AutobioGraphix	Diana Schutz (ed.)	Dark Horse Comics	Nominee	
2004	Little Lit: It Was a Dark and Silly Night	Art Spiegelman and Françoise Mouly (eds.)	HarperCollins	Nominee	
2005	Michael Chabon Presents The Amazing Adventures of the Escapist	Diana Schutz and David Land (eds.)	Dark Horse Comics	Winner	
2005	The Dark Horse Book of Witchcraft	Scott Allie (ed.)	Dark Horse Books	Nominee	
2005	The Matrix Comics, vol. 2	Spencer Lamm (ed.)	Burlyman Entertainment	Nominee	
2005	Common Grounds	Jim McLauchlin (ed.), by Troy Hickman and others	Top Cow Productions/Image Comics	Nominee	
2005	McSweeney's Quarterly #13	Chris Ware (ed.)	McSweeney's	Nominee	
2006	Solo	Mark Chiarello (ed.)	DC Comics	Winner	
2006	The Dark Horse Book of the Dead	Scott Allie (ed.)	Dark Horse Books	Nominee	
2006	24 Hour Comics Day Highlights 2005	Nat Gertler (ed.)	About Comics	Nominee	
2006	Mome	Gary Groth and Eric Reynolds (eds.)	Fantagraphics	Nominee	
2006	Flight, vol. 2	Kazu Kibuishi (ed.)	Image Comics	Nominee	
2007	Fables: 1001 Nights of Snowfall	Shelly Bond (ed.), by Troy Hickman and others	Vertigo Comics/DC Comics	Winner	
2007	Japan as Viewed by 17 Creators	Frédéric Boilet (ed.)	Fanfare/Ponent Mon	Nominee	
2007	Kramers Ergot #6	Sammy Harkham (ed.)	Buenaventura Press	Nominee	
2007	Hotwire Comix and Capers	Glenn Head (ed.)	Fantagraphics	Nominee	
2007	Project: Romantic	Chris Pitzer (ed.)	AdHouse Books	Nominee	
2008	5	Gabriel Bá, Becky Cloonan, Fábio Moon, Vasilis Lolos, and Rafael Grampá	self-published	Winner	
2008	24Seven, vol. 2	Ivan Brandon (ed.)	Image Comics	Nominee	
2008	Mome	Gary Groth and Eric Reynolds (eds.)	Fantagraphics	Nominee	
2008	The Best American Comics 2007	Anne Elizabeth Moore and Chris Ware (eds.)	Houghton Mifflin	Nominee	
2008	Postcards: True Stories That Never Happened	Jason Rodriguez (ed.)	Villard	Nominee	
2009	Comic Book Tattoo: Narrative Art Inspired by the Lyrics and Music of Tori Amos	Rantz Hoseley (ed.)	Image Comics	Winner	
2009	MySpace Dark Horse Presents	Scott Allie and Sierra Hahn (eds.)	Dark Horse Comics	Nominee	
2009	The Best American Comics 2008	Lynda Barry (ed.)	Houghton Mifflin	Nominee	
2009	An Anthology of Graphic Fiction, Cartoons, and True Stories, vol. 2	Ivan Brunetti (ed.)	Yale University Press	Nominee	
2009	Kramers Ergot #7	Sammy Harkham (ed.)	Buenaventura Press	Nominee	
2010s
2010	Popgun, vol. 3	Mark Andrew Smith, D. J. Kirkbride, and Joe Keatinge (eds.)	Image Comics	Winner	
2010	What Is Torch Tiger?	Paul Briggs (ed.)	Torch Tiger	Nominee	
2010	Syncopated: An Anthology of Nonfiction Picto-Essays	Brendan Burford (ed.)	Villard	Nominee	
2010	Flight, vol. 6	Kazu Kibuishi (ed.)	Villard	Nominee	
2010	Abstract Comics	Andrei Molotiu (ed.)	Fantagraphics	Nominee	
2010	Bob Dylan Revisited	Bob Weill (ed.)	W. W. Norton & Company	Nominee	
2011	Mouse Guard: Legends of the Guard	Paul Morrissey and David Petersen (eds.)	Archaia Entertainment	Winner	
2011	The Anthology Project	Joy Ang and Nick Thornborrow (eds.)	Lucidity Press	Nominee	
2011	Trickster: Native American Tales	Matt Dembicki (ed.)	Fulcrum Books	Nominee	
2011	Korea as Viewed by 12 Creators	Nicolas Finet (ed.)	Fanfare/Ponent Mon	Nominee	
2011	Liquid City, vol. 2	Sonny Liew and Lim Cheng Tju (eds.)	Image Comics	Nominee	
2012	Dark Horse Presents	Mike Richardson (ed.)	Dark Horse Comics	Winner	
2012	The Someday Funnies	Michel Choquette (ed.)	Abrams ComicArts	Nominee	
2012	Nelson	Rob Davis and Woodrow Phoenix (eds.)	Blank Slate Books	Nominee	
2012	Nursery Rhyme Comics	Chris Duffy (ed.)	First Second Books	Nominee	
2012	Yiddishkeit: Jewish Vernacular and the New Land	Harvey Pekar and Paul Buhle (eds.)	Abrams ComicArts	Nominee	
2013	Dark Horse Presents	Mike Richardson (ed.)	Dark Horse Comics	Winner	
2013	No Straight Lines: Four Decades of Queer Comics	Justin Hall (ed.)	Fantagraphics	Nominee	
2013	Where Is Dead Zero?	Jeff Ranjo, Jed Diffenderfer, (eds.)	Dead Zero Publishing	Nominee	
2013	2000 AD	Matt Smith (ed.)	Rebellion Developments	Nominee	
2013	Nobrow #7: Brave New World	Alex Spiro and Sam Arthur (eds.)	Nobrow Press	Nominee	
2014	Dark Horse Presents	Mike Richardson (ed.)	Dark Horse Comics	Winner	
2014	Nobrow #8: Hysteria	Sam Arthur and Alex Spiro (eds.)	Nobrow Press	Nominee	
2014	Smoke Signal	Gabe Fowler (ed.)	Desert Island	Nominee	
2014	Thrilling Adventure Hour	Matthew Levine and Cameron Chittock (eds.), by Ben Acker, Ben Blacker, et al.	Archaia Entertainment/Boom! Studios	Nominee	
2014	Outlaw Territory	Michael Woods (ed.)	Image Comics	Nominee	
2015	Little Nemo: Dream Another Dream	Josh O'Neill, Andrew Carl, and Chris Stevens (eds.)	Locust Moon	Winner	
2015	Masterful Marks: Cartoonists Who Changed the World	Monte Beauchamp (ed.)	Simon & Schuster	Nominee	
2015	To End All Wars: The Graphic Anthology of The First World War	Jonathan Clode and John Stuart Clark (eds.)	Soaring Penguin	Nominee	
2015	In the Dark: A Horror Anthology	Rachel Deering (ed.)	Tiny Behemoth Press/IDW Publishing	Nominee	
2015	Massive: Gay Erotic Manga and the Men Who Make It	Anne Ishii, Chip Kidd, and Graham Kolbeins (eds.)	Fantagraphics	Nominee	
2016	Drawn & Quarterly, Twenty-Five Years of Contemporary, Cartooning Comics, and Graphic Novels	Tom Devlin (ed.)	Drawn & Quarterly	Winner	
2016	24 x 7	Dan Berry (ed.)	Fanfare	Nominee	
2016	Eat More Comics: The Best of the Nib	Matt Bors (ed.)	The Nib	Nominee	
2016	Mouse Guard: Legends of the Guard, vol. 3	David Petersen (ed.)	Boom! Studios/Archaia Entertainment	Nominee	
2016	Peanuts: A Tribute to Charles M. Schulz	Shannon Watters (ed.)	Boom! Studios/KaBOOM!	Nominee	
2017	Love Is Love	Sarah Gaydos and Jamie S. Rich (eds.)	IDW Publishing/DC Comics	Winner	
2017	Spanish Fever: Stories by the New Spanish Cartoonists	Santiago Garcia (ed.)	Fantagraphics	Nominee	
2017	Island Magazine	Brandon Graham and Emma Ríos (eds.)	Image Comics	Nominee	
2017	Kramers Ergot #9	Sammy Harkham (ed.)	Fantagraphics	Nominee	
2017	Baltic Comics Anthology š! #26: dADa	David Schilter and Sanita Muižniece (eds.)	kuš!	Nominee	
2018	Elements: Fire, A Comic Anthology by Creators of Color	Taneka Stotts (ed.)	Beyond Press	Winner	
2018	A Bunch of Jews (and Other Stuff): A Minyen Yidn	Max B. Perlson, Trina Robbins, et al.	Bedside Press	Nominee	
2018	The Spirit Anthology	Sean Phillips (ed.)	Lakes International Comic Art Festival	Nominee	
2018	Now #1	Eric Reynolds (ed.)	Fantagraphics	Nominee	
2018	A Castle in England	Jamie Rhodes, et al.	Nobrow Press	Nominee	
2019	Puerto Rico Strong	Marco Lopez, Desiree Rodriguez, Hazel Newlevant, Derek Ruiz, and Neil Schwartz (eds.)	Lion Forge Comics	Winner	
2019	Femme Magnifique: 50 Magnificent Women Who Changed the World	Shelly Bond (ed.)	Black Crown/IDW Publishing	Nominee	
2019	Twisted Romance	Alex de Campi (ed.)	Image Comics	Nominee	
2019	Where We Live: A Benefit for the Survivors in Las Vegas	Will Dennis (ed.), curated by J. H. Williams III and Wendy Wright-Williams	Image Comics	Nominee	
2020s
2020	Drawing Power: Women’s Stories of Sexual Violence, Harassment and Survival	Diane Noomin (ed.)	Abrams ComicArts	Winner	
2020	The Nib #2–4	Matt Bors (ed.)	The Nib	Nominee	
2020	Kramers Ergot #10	Sammy Harkham (ed.)	Fantagraphics	Nominee	
2020	ABC of Typography	David Rault	SelfMadeHero	Nominee	
2020	Baltic Comics Anthology š! #34-37	David Schilter, Sanita Muižniece, et al. (eds.)	kuš!	Nominee	
2021	Menopause: A Comic Treatment	MK Czerwiec (ed.)	Graphic Medicine/Pennsylvania State University Press	Winner	
2021	Hey, Amateur! Go From Novice to Nailing It in 9 Panels	Shelly Bond (ed.)	IDW Publishing/Black Crown	Nominee	
2021	Los Angeles Times	Sammy Harkham (ed.)	NTWRK	Nominee	
2021	Ex Mag, vols. 1–2	Wren McDonald (ed.)	Peow Studio	Nominee	
2021	Guantanamo Voices: True Accounts from the World’s Most Infamous Prison	Sarah Mirk (ed.)	Abrams ComicArts	Nominee	
2021	Now	Eric Reynolds (ed.)	Fantagraphics	Nominee	
2022	You Died: An Anthology of the Afterlife	Kel McDonald and Andrea Purcell (eds.)	Iron Circus	Winner	
2022	Flash Forward: An Illustrated Guide to Possible (And Not So Possible Tomorrows)	By Rose Eveleth, Laura Dozier (ed.)	Abrams ComicArts	Nominee	
2022	My Only Child	By Wang Ning, Wang Saili (ed.), Emma Massara (trans.)	Fanfare Presents	Nominee	
2022	The Silver Coin	Michael Walsh	Image Comics	Nominee	
2022	Superman: Red & Blue	Jamie S. Rich, Brittany Holzherr, and Diegs Lopez (eds.)	DC Comics	Nominee	
2023	The Nib Magazine	Matt Bors (ed.)	Nib	Winner	
2023	Creepshow	Alex Antone and Jon Moisan (eds.)	Image Comics	Nominee	
2023	The Illustrated Al: The Songs of “Weird Al” Yankovic	Josh Bernstein (ed.)	Z2	Nominee	
2023	Sensory: Life on the Spectrum	Bex Ollerton (ed.)	Andrews McMeel	Nominee	
2023	Tori Amos: Little Earthquakes, The Graphic Album	Rantz Hoseley (ed.)	Z2	Nominee	
2024	Comics for Ukraine	Scott Dunbier (ed.)	Zoop	Winner	
2024	Deep Cuts	Kyle Higgins, Joe Clark, and Danilo Beyruth	Image Comics	Nominee	
2024	The Devil's Cut	Will Dennis (ed.)	DSTLRY	Nominee	
2024	MarvelAge #1000	Tom Brevoort (ed.)	Marvel Comics	Nominee	
2024	The Out Side: Trans & Nonbinary Comics	The Kao, Min Christensen, and David Daneman (eds.)	Andrews McMeel	Nominee	
2024	Swan Songs	W. Maxwell Prince	Image Comics	Nominee	
2025	Godzilla's 70th Anniversary	Jake Williams (ed.)	IDW	Winner	
2025	EC Cruel Universe	Sierra Hahn and Matt Dryer (eds.)	Oni Press	Nominee	
2025	Now: The New Comics Anthology #13	Eric Reynolds (ed.)	Fantagraphics	Nominee	
2025	Peep #1	Sammy Harkham and Steve Weissman (eds.)	Brain Dead/Kyle Ng	Nominee	
2025	So Buttons #14: Life and Death	Jonathon Baylis	So Buttons Comix	Nominee	
2026	DC Pride 2025	Andrea Shea, Jillian Grant	DC	Winner	
2026	Come Out and Play: The Queer Sports Project	Meghan Kemp-Gee, Megan Praz	Stacked Deck Press	Nominee	
2026	Noir Is the New Black Season 2		FairSquare Graphics	Nominee	
2026	2000AD 2026 Annual Featuring Judge Dredd	Oliver Pickles	Rebellion	Nominee	
