= Eisner Award for Best Editor =

American comic book award

- Awarded for: Best Editor
- Country: United States
- First award: 1992
- Most recent winner (1997): Dan Raspler
- Website: www.comic-con.org/awards/eisner-awards-current-info

The Eisner Award for Best Editor is a defunct award for "creative achievement" in American comic books. It was given out every year between 1992 and 1997. The award was proposed but not given out in 1991 because no nominee received more than two votes.

== Winners and nominees ==
Year	Editor	Titles	Ref.
1992	Karen Berger	The Sandman (DC Comics), Shade, the Changing Man (DC Comics), Kid Eternity (DC Comics), and The Books of Magic (DC Comics)	
1992	Mike Carlin	Superman titles (DC Comics), and The Psycho (DC Comics)	
1992	Barbara Kesel	Badlands (Dark Horse Comics), Aliens: Genocide (Dark Horse Comics), and Star Wars (Dark Horse Comics)	
1992	Diana Schutz	Billi 99 (Dark Horse Comics), Batman Versus Predator (Dark Horse Comics), and Predator: Big Game (Dark Horse Comics)	
1992	Randy Stradley	Dark Horse Presents (Dark Horse Comics) and Give Me Liberty (Dark Horse Comics)	
1993	Karen Berger	The Sandman (DC Comics) and Shade, the Changing Man (DC Comics)	
1993	Steve Bissette	Taboo (Spiderbaby Graphix/Tundra Publishing)	
1993	Archie Goodwin	Legends of the Dark Knight (DC Comics), Batman: Sword of Azrael (DC Comics), and Deadman: Exorcism (DC Comics)	
1993	Gary Groth	Bleeding Heart, (Fantagraphics), Eightball (Fantagraphics), Love and Rockets (Fantagraphics), Pictopia (Fantagraphics), and The Comics Journal (Fantagraphics)	
1993	Chris Oliveros	Drawn & Quarterly (Drawn & Quarterly)	
1994
1994	Karen Berger (Note: There was a tie between Karen Berger and Mike Carlin in 1994.)	The Sandman (DC Comics/Vertigo Comics) and Death: The High Cost of Living (DC Comics/Vertigo Comics)	
1994	Mike Carlin	Superman titles (DC Comics)	
1994	Diana Schutz	Batman/Grendel (Comico Comics/DC Comics), Grendel Tales (Dark Horse Comics), American Splendor (Harvey Pekar), 1001 Nights of Bacchus (Dark Horse Comics), The Jam (Dark Horse Comics)	
1995	Karen Berger	The Sandman (DC Comics/Vertigo Comics) and Sandman Mystery Theatre (DC Comics/Vertigo Comics)	
1995	Andy Helfer	The Big Book of Urban Legends (Paradox Press)	
1995	Dwayne McDuffie	Worlds Collide (Milestone Comics), Xombi (Milestone Comics), and Shadow Cabinet (Milestone Comics)	
1995	Bob Schreck	Madman (Dark Horse Comics), Dark Horse Presents (Dark Horse Comics), and Rascals in Paradise (Dark Horse Comics)	
1995	Diana Schutz	Grendel Tales (Dark Horse Comics), American Splendor (Dark Horse Comics), and The Dance of Lifey Death (Dark Horse Comics)	
1996	Monte Beauchamp	BLAB! (Kitchen Sink Press)	
1996	Stuart Moore (Note: There was a tie between Stuart Moore and Bronwyn Taggart in 1996.)	Swamp Thing (DC Comics/Vertigo Comics), The Invisibles (DC Comics/Vertigo Comics), and Preacher (DC Comics/Vertigo Comics)	
1996	Chris Oliveros	Drawn & Quarterly (Drawn & Quarterly)	
1996	Bronwyn Taggart	The Big Book of Weirdos (Paradox Press), The Big Book of Conspiracies (Paradox Press), Brooklyn Dreams, (Paradox Press) and Stuck Rubber Baby (Paradox Press)	
1996	Kim Thompson	Acme Novelty Library (Fantagraphics), Palestine (Fantagraphics), and Zero Zero (Fantagraphics)	
1997	Tom Brevoort	Untold Tales of Spider-Man (Marvel Comics) and Daily Bugle (Marvel Comics)	
1997	M. M. Carwald (Note: M. M. Carwald was a fictional editor whose name was a combination of DC Comics editor Mike Carlin and Marvel comics editor Mark Gruenwald.)	Amalgam Comics line (DC Comics/Marvel Comics)	
1997	Andy Helfer	Gon (Paradox Press) and The Big Book of Little Criminals (Paradox Press)	
1997	Scott Peterson	Batman Black and White (DC Comics)	
1997	Joe Pruett	Negative Burn (Caliber Comics)	
1997	Dan Raspler	Kingdom Come (DC Comics), Hitman (DC Comics), The Spectre (DC Comics), and Sergio Aragonés Destroys DC (DC Comics)	
