= Lennie Mace =

American contemporary artist (born 1965)

Lennie Mace レニー・メイス
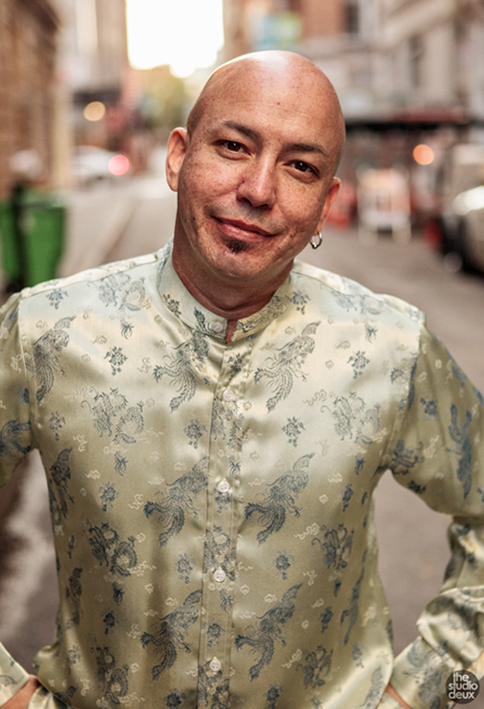
- Arriving at his PEN PAL exhibition, 2012
- Born: 1965 (age 60–61); New York, NY
- Education: Self-taught; School of Visual Arts (New York)
- Known for: Fine art, illustration, design
- Movement: Ballpoint pen artwork; PENting, Media Graffiti
- Awards: Scholastic Art Achievement Award, USA; SPC Graphic Design International Grand Prix, Japan
- Website: www.lenniemace.com

Lennie Mace (レニー・メイス, Renī Meisu, born 1965) is an American contemporary artist, born in New York City. Mace is predominantly known for his drawings in ballpoint pen, using them to create fine artwork. He is considered a pioneer of the medium. His imagination has also served commercial purposes, appearing in print as illustrations and comic art. Art reviewers have referred to Mace as the "da Vinci of doodlers" and the "ballpoint Picasso".

Mace has resided in Japan since 1994. A hair salon in central Tokyo, belonging to a Japanese patron, doubles as the Lennie Mace VIEWseum, displaying a collection of original artwork housed within an interior hand-crafted by the artist. He remains active in art communities of both America and Japan.

== Background ==
As a teenager, Mace was the Gold Key winner of a Scholastic Art Achievement Award. He passed the entry exam for New York's High School of Art and Design but did not attend. He briefly attended New York's School of Visual Arts in the early 1980s.

== Art career ==
=== 1987-1992: Illustration & early exhibitions ===
Lennie Mace's first professional art-related work began appearing in New York City during the mid-1980s, from which time he gained recognition as an illustrator. From the start of his career, his illustrations and artwork have been rendered solely using ballpoint pens, whether as simple black line drawings or as shaded halftones using a range of available ballpoint pen colors. Imagery depicted in his artwork touches upon aspects of so-called high-brow and low-brow aesthetics, even during the late 1980s when there was a greater divide between both art worlds. His artwork would go on to decorate the pages of a diverse range of publications, from High Times magazine to The New York Times newspaper.

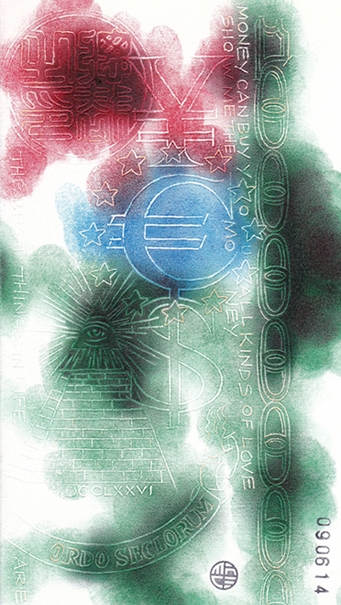
Lennie Mace ¥ € $ (2014) dry ballpoint pen and ballpoint pen ink on paper. "Invisible Ink" series.

Mace was among a circle of emerging artists of the late 1980s whose talents were encouraged by New York-based entities providing work and exposure. His earliest illustration credits appear in High Times magazine in 1987. Notable contributions to the magazine include two cover illustrations; the first published in the November 1988 issue, and another published in 1992. Both dealt with the subject of growing marijuana in outer space. The choice of Mace's artwork for use on the cover of the magazine was a point of contention among the editorial staff at the time — a democratic process outlined in a 1992 High Times Greatest Hits anthology — and incited hate-mail from the magazine's readership. Mace's Pot on the Moon illustration was chosen over High Times' characteristic marijuana photography, a nude photograph of Allen Ginsberg and other designs.

Mace was also among artists supporting the listener-sponsored, free-form radio station WFMU by providing artwork for the station's promotion, publications and fund-raising drives. During the same period, Mace became a prominent contributor to New York Press, a free alternative weekly, during the newspaper's peak years. He continued his involvement at New York Press even while he'd already based himself in Japan in the mid-1990s. Later work for the publication often covered Asian topics, or displayed Asian influence. Artwork and graphics of a sexual nature contributed to Screw magazine in New York City and Hustler magazine nationally in the early 1990s gave Mace a reputation as an erotic artist which was furthered via inclusion in erotic art anthologies such as Ars Erotica: The Best Modern Erotic Art.

Years of work as an illustrator continued into other commercial outlets, including cartoon work. A fan of comic books in his youth, he'd even created his own. Later, cartooning courses were among those Mace chose in lieu of a major while attending School of Visual Arts in the mid-1980s. His artwork was among those published in comic books showcasing the students of courses taught by Harvey Kurtzman (Mad; Playboy's Little Annie Fanny) and Will Eisner (The Spirit), respectively. In the mid-1990s Mace was among regular contributors to Paradox Press’ award-winning Big Book series. He supplied artwork for many of the Big Books, but earned special recognition for his input to the Conspiracies book as well as the Urban Legends book. Mad magazine also employed Mace as a cartoonist.

Mace had participated in group exhibitions in the 1980s, but his first solo exhibition came at the start of the 1990s. His earliest exhibitions were held annually at the I AM THE BEST ARTIST gallery of René Moncada in New York's SoHo neighborhood, at the time the city's predominant art district. In those early exhibitions many originals of his published illustrations were displayed alongside new artworks of his own. Exhibitions were publicized by publications in which the illustrations appeared, adding to the attraction of fans who’d appreciated the artwork in print. As his own original artwork flourished, illustrations were exhibited less.

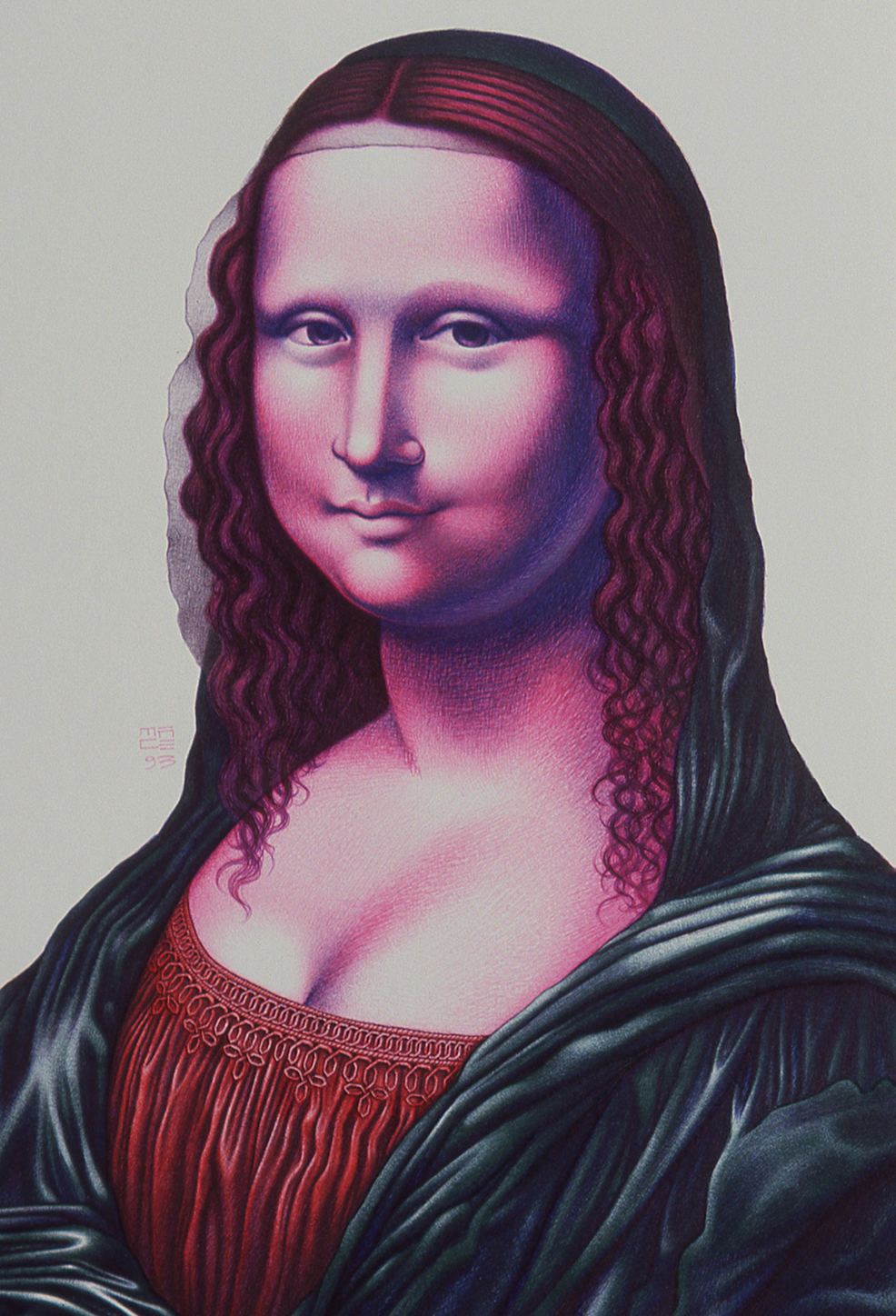
Lennie Mace, Mona a'la Mace (1993) ballpoint pen on paper

From the start, Mace chose clever exhibition titles such as Penmanship (1991) and INKorporated (1993); conspicuous wordplay relating to his preferred medium of ballpoint pen. Exhibition titles such as Play Pen (Tokyo, 2011) and Pen Pal (USA, 2012) continue the tradition. Noted art writer Carlo McCormick dubbed Mace the da Vinci of doodlers in a preview of an early exhibition.

=== 1993-1999: Japan, deportation, 365DAZE project ===
In 1993, Lennie Mace attracted the interest of Pilot pen company president Ron Shaw, who then commissioned him to draw a replica of Leonardo da Vinci’s Mona Lisa using only Pilot ballpoint pens. New York's Daily News reported the "high five-figure" price tag. Mona a’la Mace was subsequently the highlight of Mace's Macedonia exhibition in November 1993, and Mace was the subject of a feature interview by Morry Alter on CBS Evening News that month. Alter gave special notice to the term PENtings, coined by the artist in reference to the sometime painterly quality of his more ambitious artwork in ballpoint pen, i.e. Mona a’la Mace. Video showing Mace drawing was also broadcast; a drawing of a dog later titled CBS Dog displayed at his INKorporated exhibition. The reporter also made an on-air point of joking about Mace's predilection for wearing shoes of mismatched color. Mona a’la Mace was displayed in the lobby of Pilots’ offices for a time, and may have been used for corporate publicity, but the artwork's current location and usage are unconfirmed. Lennie Mace is still known to wear mis-colored footwear.

A corporate commission in 1993 began Mace's connection with Japan. He was hired to draw the five-story pagoda of Tō-ji temple in Kyoto photorealistically in ballpoint pen. The trip to Japan to draw it on-site was considered partial payment. During his earliest time in Japan, he gained notoriety in Tokyo nightclubs applying ballpoint drawings onto customers’ clothing and flesh for free drinks (pictured), which led to legitimate work, including temporary tattoos for music videos, film clients, and fashion events. Illustration work for expat publications helped introduce Mace to the international community in Tokyo. Portraiture soon became a standard element of the artist's output in Japan, rendering people and pets in ballpoint pen by commission. Exhibitions in Japan include regular showings at Isetan Department Store. Most have occurred in the flagship Shinjuku store in Tokyo, but have also been held at other branches around Japan. The artist continues to maintain a presence in Tokyo via exhibitions and collaborations.

Juxtapoz art magazine reported Mace's sudden 1997 deportation from Japan, although specific reasons were not provided. Unexpectedly back in America the artist set out on the road, which became the basis for his 365DAZE project of 1998. For this project the artist spent the full year of 1998 driving around the United States, over 30,000 miles (48,280 km) by his own account, doing a drawing-per-day, embellishing whatever found-media he came across in whatever part of the country through which he happened to be traveling.

The profusion of Mace's Media Graffiti during prior years peaked with his 365DAZE project. Exhibitions in 1996 titled "Media Graffiti" in both New York and Tokyo had been composed entirely of artwork from the series, but the series had its origins within the emergence of graffiti culture of the 1980s in New York City, of which Mace was a participant. The series’ title refers to the artist's practice of embellishing existing printed matter with his ballpoint doodles, sometimes in the form of ironic commentary to what is already implied within the advertisement. He considers the series his artistic “shorthand", able to render quickly under any circumstances.

Everyone’s drawn a mustache on a (photo of a) model... I just never stopped. Lennie Mace, on his Media Graffiti series.

Mace began officially publicizing these works as Media Graffiti as output grew to dominate his exhibitions throughout the 1990s. He also refers to the series as Ad Libs, an acronym of "ADvertisement LIBeration" adapted by Mace as a pun of "ad lib," to which he has compared his creative process — improvisational, stream of conscious creation — a process with unpredictable results in which the art effectively "draws itself," from an instinctive visual library.

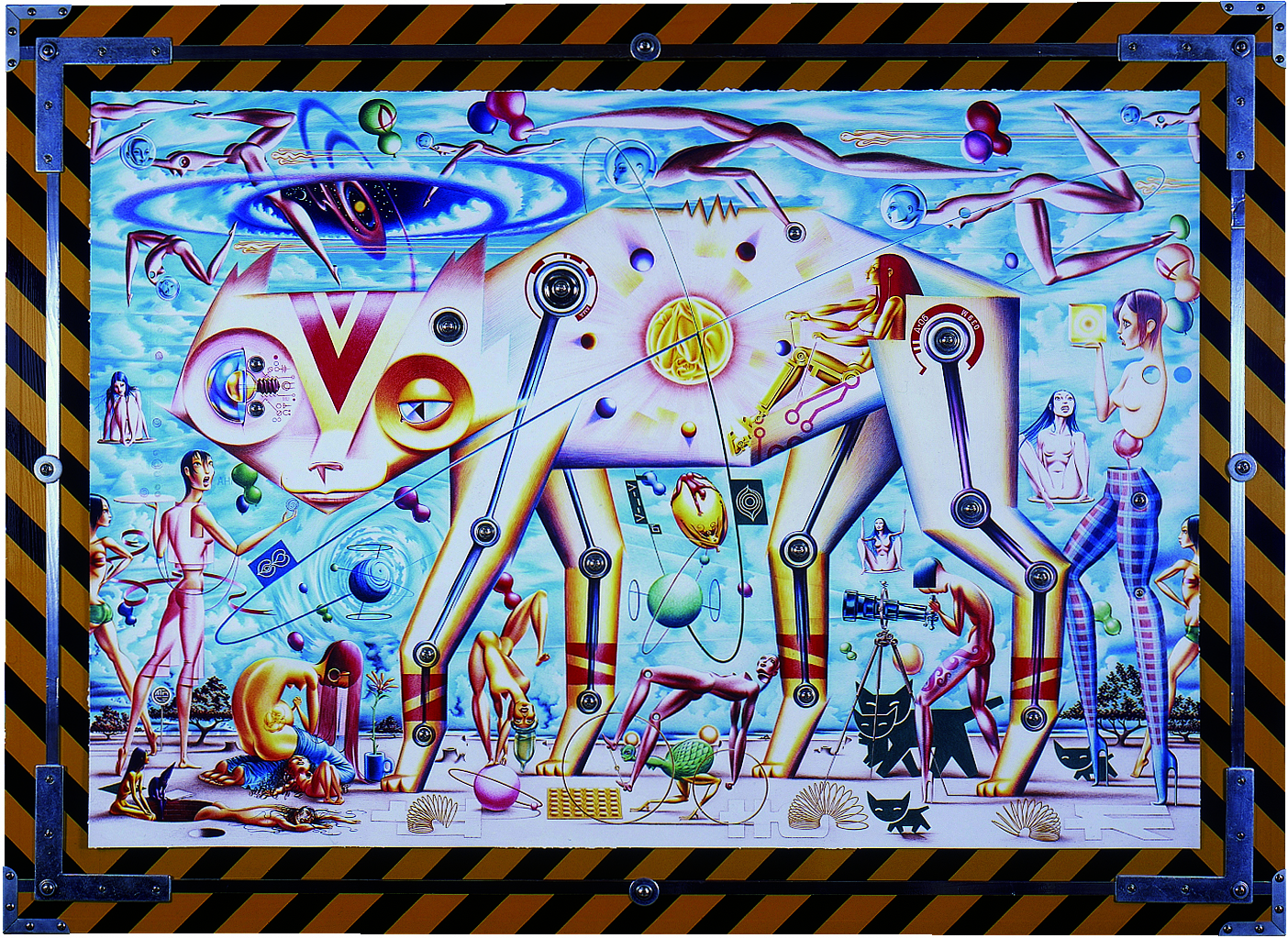
Lennie Mace ballpoint "PENting" Uchuu Neko Parade (2005) ballpoint pen and hardware on paper, 130 x 92cm.

Mace spent 1999 touring with selections of completed 365DAZE artwork, beginning with New York City in January. San Francisco followed, in April, and Los Angeles thereafter. Media Graffiti from Lennie Mace's 365DAZE project has also been exhibited in other cities as part of group exhibitions in Chicago, Detroit, Tampa and Miami. As recognition of his Media Graffiti broadened, corporate interests began offering finer printings of their own products for Mace to embellish, to then be used for promotional purposes.

=== 2000-2010: Return to Japan, Lennie Mace VIEWseum ===
Mace was able to return to Japan, and soon became the de facto house-artist for the Febbraio Di Ales cosmetics company, whose president is a principal patron in Japan. Work for Ales included most of that which Mace had become recognized — illustration, logo and font design, decorative fine art, et’al — and added architectural and interior design to his credits. Many of Mace's most substantial projects in Japan were commissioned by Ales, involving full interior designs and occasionally exterior architectural design as well. The first began as simple interior modifications to the company's Ales International salon in Harajuku, to accommodate Mace artwork bought by the owner. Customer satisfaction and enthusiasm led to the expansion of the commission to include the full interior, to provide more display space — work which would go on for nearly two years between 2000 and 2002, even as the salon remained open for business. The salon's entry walls received special attention; a ballpoint pen mural and mixed-media installation which was widely reported by both hair-make publications and general media outlets. A number of Mace's "365Daze" Media Graffiti are on permanent display at the VIEWseum.

It's very appropriate having a museum in a hair salon (in Japan) because Japanese people spend far more time in hair salons than in museums. Lennie Mace, on his Tokyo VIEWseum.

The official re-christening of the salon as the Lennie Mace VIEWseum occurred on February 2, 2002. Promotional materials describe it as "an ongoing, full-interior, mixed-media, enviro-installation", with a collection of the artist's ballpoint pen originals sharing the space with site specific installations incorporating imaginative arrangements of his patron's other otaku collections. Three mannequin-like creations with elaborately fabricated hairstyles, all commissioned by Ales, were entered into a national design competition in 2004. One of them, a cyber-punk rendition very different from Mace's 2D artwork, went on to win the Grand Prize.

Another mammoth Ales commission was a full interior mural done in paint for the company's Sugar salon — a rare occasion of Mace creating figurative imagery using a medium other than ballpoint pen, at a scale he'd never before attempted. These commissions included signage, promotional artwork, and anything else per Mace's whim which would serve the client's fancy. These sometimes included the design of furnishings such as chairs and tables, and often the actual hand-manufacturing of details such as clocks, to match the overall designs.

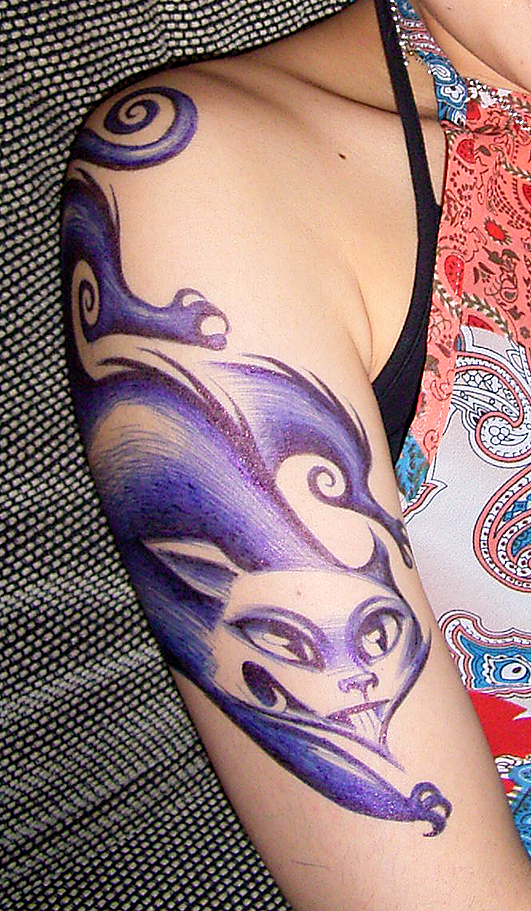
Lennie Mace ballpoint pen temporary tattoo, Tokyo (2006).

=== 2011~ ===
Drawings on wood and denim figure largely in recent artwork. Mace's denim "scrolls" have been appearing in greater quantities since the beginning of the 2010s. The ballpoint-on-denim creations, a contemporary interpretation of traditional Japanese sumi ink on washi paper scrolls, are fabricated from the artist's own used jeans. Woven tapestries from Japan bearing Lennie Mace's imagery started making appearances in American galleries in 2012.

Mace has been creating single-panel cartoons under the title Japanglish101 since 2013 as a contributor to the japanglish.org website. The cartoons offer "twisted takes on Japanese culture".

Portrait commissions continue to be a substantial component of Mace's output. His Media Graffiti series also continues, with magazine page doodles evolving over time to now include larger printed media such as Japanese subway posters. Mace annually produces New Year Card designs which adhere to the cycle of animals celebrated in the Chinese calendar.

Mace used his Invisible Ink exhibition (2015, Tokyo) to formally introduce his "dry pen" technique. He had been employing the technique in some manner for some time, using "empty" ballpoint pens to draw invisible patterns, images and text into paper. No colors are added to some of these artworks; the imagery can only be seen when lit from an angle. To others, as in ¥ € $, Mace applies ballpoint ink using his fingertips, exposing content previously drawn with a dry pen.

Media in Japan and America in late-2015 began reporting about Mace building a "castle" in the Japanese Alps.

== Style ==
Lennie Mace has been noted for his attention to detail; "intricately rendered" drawings showing "precision linework." He explains his ballpoint technique as "layers of overlapping lines" dependent of "pressure on the pen and texture of the paper," working with several colors simultaneously to achieve desired effects.

Mace has described his own work as "non-political" and "self-indulgent," but content of a surreal nature — animal legs substituted by elaborately "carved" piano legs, for example — has led some reviewers to read symbolism into his work. Size varies greatly, from elaborate large-scale to simpler, smaller works.

Mace has often incorporated materials reflecting the same "proletarian" origins of his ballpoint pens; office supplies and stationery such as loose leaf paper, corporate letterheads or memo pads, and post-it notes have all been utilized. This, he has explained, is in line with the "doodle"-like aspects commonly associated with these materials.

== Media reception ==
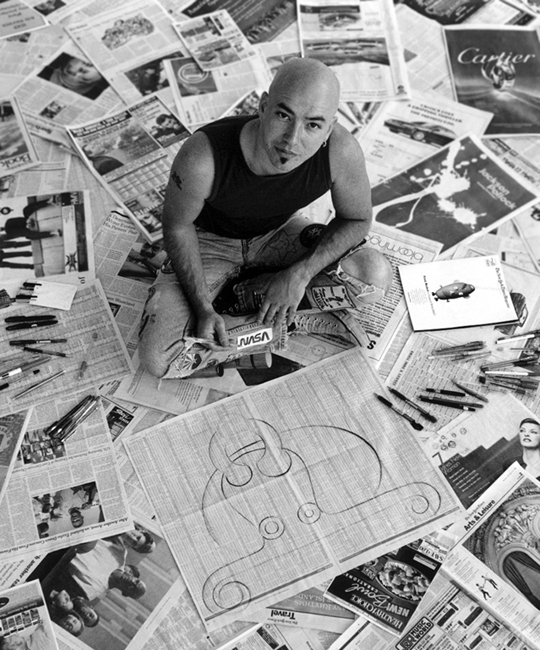
Lennie Mace, pictured with Lady Killer/Bull Market work-in-progress (ballpoint pen on newspaper, Media Graffiti Series) New York, 1998.

New York Press supported Lennie Mace's early exhibitions by promoting his "superfine, surrealistic, and elegant" ballpoint artwork. Writer and performer David Aaron Clark, a fellow Screw magazine alumni and sometime collaborator, also promoted Mace's early exhibitions in previews describing "giddy, sleek masterpieces of fantasy and sensuality." Mace has professed to a "something for everyone" approach to filling exhibitions with whatever artwork is available at the time, including random sketch work, which has spurred criticism. The same critics, however, favored him as "a draftsman of almost infinite talent." He has also been called a master of ballpoint pen artwork, and his 2012 "Pen Pal" exhibition in San Francisco was championed as "technically exceptional and conceptually intriguing." Hi Fructose art magazine commended the "intricate worlds" rendered by Mace in a review of the same exhibition.

One 1996 Media Graffiti titled Thank You Calvin, Thank You Kate garnered media attention at the time of its exhibition for Mace's playful "manipulation." The title refers to fashion designer Calvin Klein and model Kate Moss. The target of the artist's embellishment, in this case, was a risqué magazine ad for Calvin Klein's Obsession perfume. The black and white ad showed a nude Kate Moss from her waist up with one hand raised to her mouth coyly and one bare breast visible. A pocket-sized figure added by Mace in pink ink clings to Kate's arm, fixated and reaching for her nipple — also subtly highlighted in pink — as a baby's pacifier falls from his mouth, agape. The image, as presupposed by the media, implies that Mace's figure prefers the real nipple over its plastic imitation, and the title implying the artist's gratitude for being provided such ripe source material.

Mace's flair for imbuing his Media Graffiti with "sexual and cultural double entendres" was again publicized during his 365DAZE project in 1998. Juxtapoz art magazine's sister publication Erotica published a set of the series' "dirty pictures" featuring another Calvin Klein ad "liberated" as the issue's centerfold pin-up spread. Onto a black and white underwear ad showing a woman being handled by a man from behind, Mace adds a few extra hands, including one cutting through her blouse with scissors, and the annotation "Her Wish? His? Mine? Yours?"

A Spanish magazine in 1998 featured Mace in an interview titled El Picasso Del Boligrafo (The Ballpoint Picasso), presenting his Media Graffiti and 365DAZE project. Mace's artwork appeared on the cover and throughout the magazine. The article noted the artist's vivid imagination.
