= Lady Killer (comic book) =

Comic book series by Joëlle Jones and Jamie S. Rich

- Lady Killer #1. Art by Joëlle Jones

Publication information
- Publisher: Dark Horse Comics
- Format: Limited series
- Genre: Crime Thriller
- Publication date: 2015-2017

Creative team
- Created by: Joëlle Jones
- Written by: Joëlle Jones; Jamie S. Rich(first series only)
- Penciller: Joëlle Jones
- Letterer: Crank!
- Colorist: Laura Allred

Collected editions
- Lady Killer: ISBN 9781616557577
- Lady Killer 2: ISBN 9781506700298

Lady Killer is a 2015-2016 comic book series written by Joëlle Jones and Jamie S. Rich, illustrated by Joëlle Jones and colored by Laura Allred. The comic is a thriller taking place in the 1960s, and tells the story of Josie Schuller, a perfect housewife who leads a secret life as killer-for-hire in her spare time.

== Creation ==
The author Joëlle Jones stated in several interviews that the imagery and graphics of Lady Killer were largely inspired by her "love of vintage advertising and illustration from the 1940s through the 1960s", including the work of the American painter and press illustrator Norman Rockwell.

== Publication history ==
The original series ran for five issues from January to May 2015. A second mini-series, written solely by Jones and called Lady Killer 2, began publication in August 2016, though its publication was more sporadic, and the fifth and final issue was not released until August 2017.

== Synopsis ==
=== Lady Killer ===
Josie Schuller is seemingly the perfect housewife. Living in Seattle in 1962 with husband Gene, their twin daughters Jane and Jessica, and Gene's German mother Greta, who the family call Mother Schuller. While they are at work and school she cooks, cleans and also tells them she volunteers at a local hospice. However Josie is leading a double life, and when claiming to be running errands is actually a highly efficient contract killer who uses a number of guises - including an Avon lady and a bunny girl - to carry out hits. She gets her jobs from a shady organisation through David Peck, a self-assured and suave killer. However Peck's visits have made Mother Schuller suspicious and she surmises Josie is up to something.

Both Peck and his boss Stenholm grow to dislike Josie's growing independent streak as she prioritises family matters over contract work. Matters come to a head when she is assigned to kill a young boy who witnessed the murder of his parents. Josie is ultimately unable to go through with killing him, but Stenholm has anticipated this and has sent Peck to eliminate him. After a chase and a struggle she is able to escape in Peck's E-Type.

Knowing the company wants her dead she recruits two other killers, the Chinese-American Ruby and the elderly Irving. As both Peck and Stenholm will be at the Seattle World's Fair, Josie and Ruby volunteer as hostesses to spring a trap. The plan is complicated by the arrival of Gene and the rest of the family making a surprise visit to the Fair. Nevertheless, Josie is able to slip away and kill three agents Peck has brought along and leaves Ruby to finish him while she deals with Stenholm. However Irving arrives to tell her Ruby is in trouble, and takes over killing Stenholm with relish. Peck kills Ruby by crushing her head but Josie is able to shoot him in the face. The fight is witnessed by Mother Schuller, who recognises Irving as someone called Reinhardt. She confronts Josie, who carefully questions whether her mother-in-law wants to find out who she really is.

Afterwards Josie continues to dote on the oblivious Gene, who idly wonders whether she should get a job of her own. Josie agrees that going into business herself would be a grand idea.

=== Lady Killer 2 ===
The following year the Schuller family have relocated to Cocoa Beach, where Josie is still carrying out hits, but now as a freelancer. She soon finds the cleanup side of the work arduous, and when Irving shows up out of the blue agrees to a partnership where she carries out the killings and he deals with the mess. However Irving soon starts to behave erratically, turning up at a family beach party and inserting himself into their lives as a friend. He is violently attacked by Mother Schuller. She later explains that during her time in the Nazi civil service she discovered Reinhardt was a serial killer, while a lucrative offer to join a union of contract killers is withdrawn when they discover Josie is partners with Reinhardt - who then escalates things by killing Gene's lazy, sleazy boss.

Josie confronts him and ends their partnership. In response he plants evidence implicating Gene in the disappearance of his boss and maims the family dog. Mother Schuller suggests Gene takes the girls to the vets with the dog - giving her and Josie the opportunity to deal with Irving. Irving stabs Mother and shoots off one of Josie's fingers before she burns him with cooking sherry. He then rams his car into their house before Josie brains him with a brick. Gene returns just as the fight finishes, finally killing Irving with a shotgun - and immediately vomiting.

On Christmas Day, Gene takes the girls after his mother tells him everything about Josie, also going along with his boss' wife Josephine. While the fight has made the union even more wary of employing her they help with the cleanup as a favour to one of their other members - Peck, who survived the attack at the World's Fair and meets her at her former home.

== Critical reception ==
Lady Killer was well received by both the public and the critics. The book is rated 4.24/5 on Goodreads, and on Comic Book Roundup, it received a rate of 8.6/10 by critics, and 8.8 by the public. Alison Baker from the website Comicosity wrote that "Lady Killer is clever, fun, and has the potential to be a standout book." In 2016, Lady Killer was nominated as Best Limited Series at the Eisner Awards, and its author, Joëlle Jones was a nominee both as Best Penciller/Inker and Best Cover Artist.

== Collected editions ==
The series was collected in two trade paperbacks by Dark Horse Comics. A hardcover Library Edition collecting both series followed in 2020, with a foreword by crime author Chelsea Cain.

Title	ISBN	Release date	Issues
Lady Killer	9781616557577	2 September 2015	Lady Killer #1-5
Lady Killer 2	9781506700298	13 December 2017	Lady Killer 2 #1-5
Lady Killer Library Edition	9781506716527	10 June 2020	Lady Killer #1-5 & Lady Killer 2 #1-5

== Film adaptation ==
In May 2021, Netflix announced that a film adaptation is in the works with Blake Lively as Josie Schuller, and is to be written and directed by Diablo Cody.

== See also ==
- Female comics creators
- Portrayal of women in American comics
