= René Moncada =

South American-born artist (born 1943)

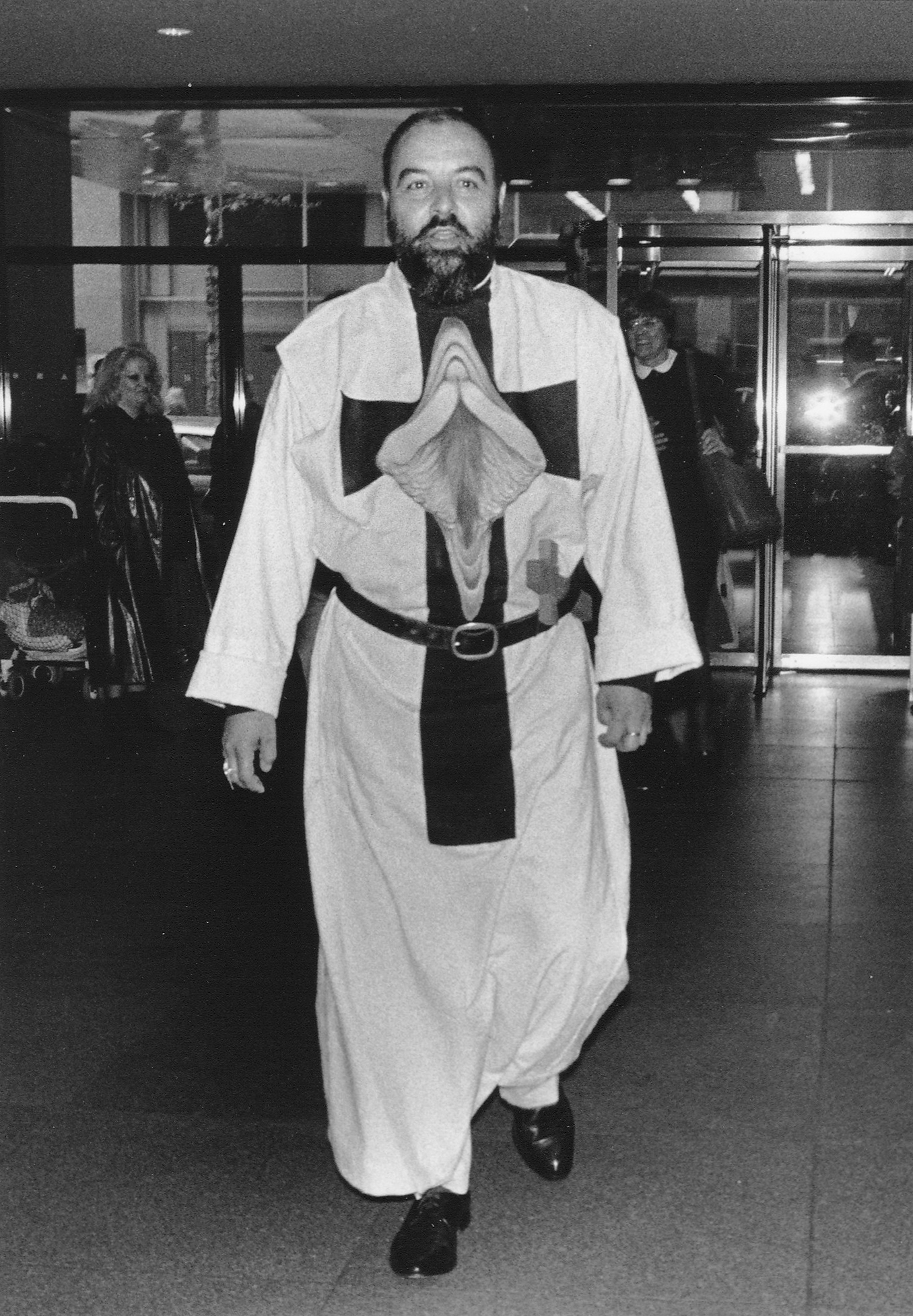
- Entering New York's MoMA, 1988.
- Born: 1943 (age 82–83); South America
- Education: Self-taught
- Known for: Fine art
- Notable work: I AM THE BEST ARTIST René murals; Sex and Violence; Nudismos
- Movement: Street art; Outsider art
- Spouse: Joanne Moncada
- Website: www.reneiamthebestartist.com

René Moncada (also René IATBA or simply René; born 1943) is a South American-born artist living in the United States of America. He is best known for a series of murals undertaken in New York City's SoHo neighborhood between the late-1970s to early-1990s which spelled out the proclamation I AM THE BEST ARTIST René. He is also separately known for controversial artwork such as Sex and Violence, which depicts a cross with a vagina at its center, and as an outspoken opponent of censorship in the arts. His art was known to be sexually suggestive which made René an occasional target of anti-pornographic groups over the years as seen with the Mott's Apple Juice piece.

== Biography ==
=== Early life ===
René Moncada was born in Colombia. At the age of four he was brought to Caracas, Venezuela, by his father, a newspaper reporter. René speaks openly about his upbringing in a poor family. The dichotomy of being the son of a very religious mother and an atheist father would inform René's views throughout his life. Ultimately, René states, his father's influence would shape his own intellect, instilling an inquisitive nature and inclination to question authority.

==== Baseball career ====
Although René had artistic aspirations as a child, his father pressed him into a baseball career, and Moncada went on to become a professional pitcher in Venezuelan major league baseball. His rookie year was in 1961, and René claims a record of seven no-hitters at that time. In 1964 he was scouted by the St. Louis Cardinals and brought to the United States. 20-year-old Moncada would begin his life in America as a minor league baseball pitcher. René taught himself English during these early years in America, later claiming his drawing skills aided his progress. Within a few years, however—which included a stint as a pitching instructor—his baseball days would come to an end.

== Art career ==
By the end of the 1960s, René Moncada had relocated to New York City. Although lacking formal art schooling, he pursued his wishes of becoming an artist.

Earliest art employment included commercial work as paste-up artist, art director and illustrator. Men's magazines of the era based in New York provided regular work, including Gent, Dude, Nugget and Cheri.

Moncada also became a major contributor to Screw magazine, which provided an outlet for the artist's early erotic illustrations, and a forum for later anti-censorship diatribes.

=== Rene's Gallery ===
René Moncada, by then married to wife Joanne, moved to SoHo in the mid-1970s. They rented the ground floor at 147 Wooster Street, which included the storefront, between Houston and Prince streets. René renovated the storefront space and opened it as Rene's Gallery in 1977. It would also sometimes be referred to as I Am The Best Artist gallery once René's signature murals had gained notoriety. The gallery was mostly used to showcase René's own work—"a monument to himself", as noted by John Strausbaugh in a 1990s New York Press cover story and interview. The artist was always available and anxious to discuss his work with visitors, and could often be found toiling with new artwork in the gallery. He also used the rear space as his studio. René naively thought opening his own gallery would earn entry into the burgeoning SoHo art set, and went about inviting neighboring gallery owners to come for studio visits or private viewings, but his invitations—and presence in general—went largely ignored. Regardless of art world disregard, René became a SoHo "fixture".

His gallery existed during a time when one could be walking the streets of SoHo aimlessly one minute and, following the sound of music and commotion emanating from any given window, enter and find oneself rubbing shoulders with a who's who of SoHo art luminaries the next minute. René himself may have been present for such festivities, identifiable in a denim jacket painted with his Best Artist "slogan", which he also emblazoned onto T-shirts and caps. He hosted such gatherings in his own gallery as well; it was the site of fashion shows, events by performance artists such as Annie Sprinkle, and exhibitions of artists such as Lennie Mace, whose exhibition publicity listed the gallery indistinctly as 147 Wooster Gallery. René's gallery was also listed internationally in guide books of Manhattan and SoHo during its existence. It was also sometimes rented for private parties, making SoHo ambience available to nonresidents.

René and Joanne Moncada lived in the space to the rear of the gallery. Side-stepping city ordinances prohibiting ground-floor residency, they constructed a second-floor sleeping loft above the gallery space. René kept the gallery open into 1999, when he and Joanne were pressured out of their long-time Wooster Street space. In 2001 the Moncadas relocated to Brooklyn.

== I AM THE BEST ARTIST murals ==
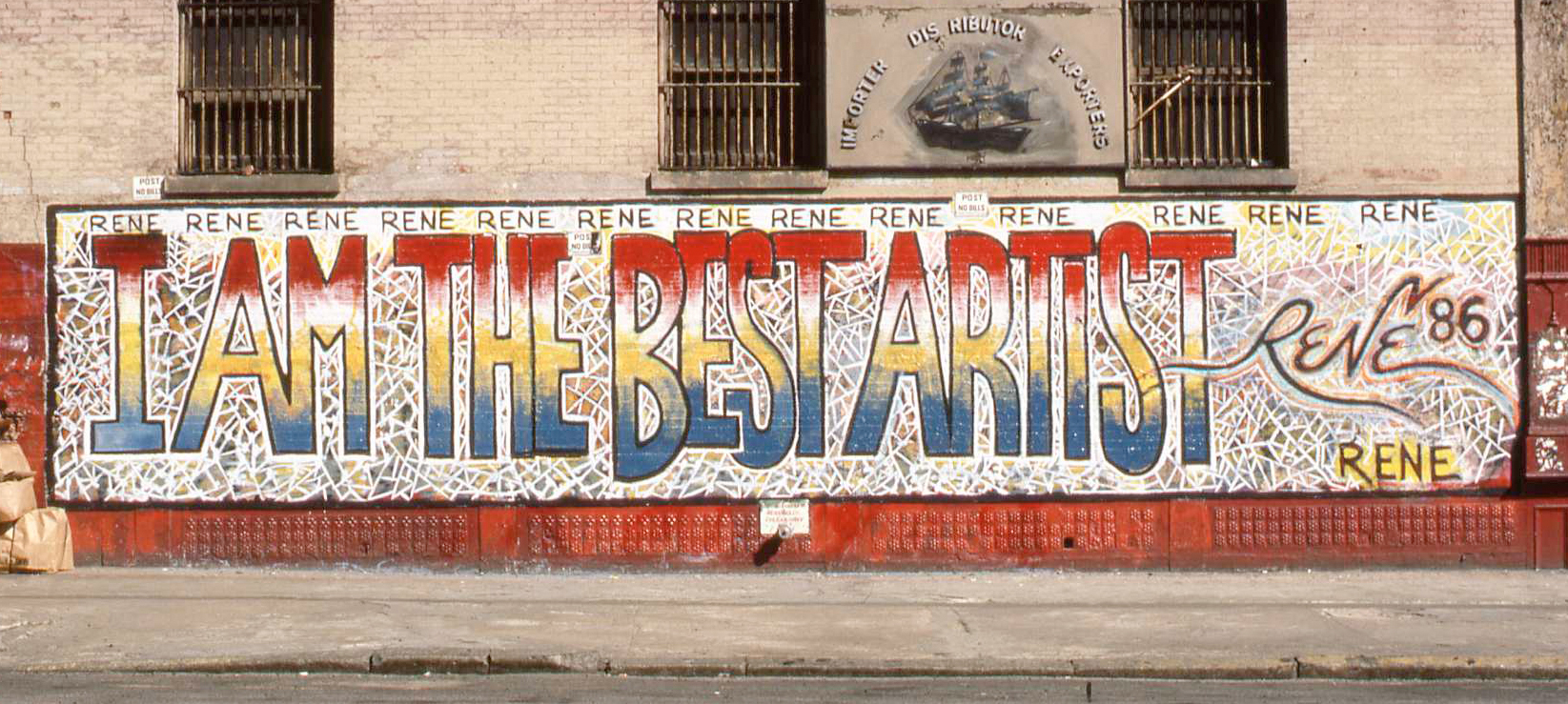
Mural along West Broadway, SoHo, New York City, 1986.

René, who in later interviews described feeling "ignored" by the art community he felt he'd helped pioneer, decided to take matters into his own hands. Beginning in the late-1970s, René began painting a series of impressively sized murals on prominently located walls of SoHo, proclaiming I AM THE BEST ARTIST René to all who walked or drove past. The undertaking, however indirectly, placed René at the forefront of street artists of the era transforming the streets of SoHo's art district into an alternative exhibition venue.

René's ubiquitous declarations, spelled out in large, capital letters punctuated by his signature "René" written in a flowing font, became a topic of conversation and debate at the time, and provided a backdrop to photographs taken by a multitude of tourists, art students, advertising layouts in magazines worldwide and Hollywood films. The murals became icons not only of the neighborhood but of the era in general, when art became a profitable commodity and SoHo became its Wall Street. They were likened to effective advertising slogans and later recognized as an early act of "art provocation".

Mural locations were centered along the stretch of West Broadway between Houston Street and Canal Street. The most prominent mural, near the corner of Broome Street and West Broadway (pictured here), measured 10 feet by 50. The largest of the murals was located on a wall along the southwest corner of West Broadway where Grand Street intersects. This location appears in a montage sequence of the 1987 movie The Secret of My Success, among other iconic images of 1980s New York City in general, and SoHo in particular.

=== Conflict and criticism ===
Although the murals became renowned, René himself remained an enigmatic figure to average passersby. Conflicts related to the murals attracted media attention, and lawsuits related to the murals raised legal discussion about intellectual property, artist's rights, and the First Amendment. René claims the art critic Robert Hughes once assured him directly that he was not, in fact, the best artist. An Artforum writer used an unrelated art review to shine a negative light on The Best Artist, calling René "untalented" and "unchic". Loss of long-time artist friends was another unfortunate consequence.

René always insisted permission was obtained from landlords to paint the murals, but requests were also sometimes refused, with some SoHo residents commenting that though a mural would be welcome, an I AM THE BEST ARTIST René mural would not be welcome. In the case of one refusal, Moncada painted the attendants' stand of the parking lot facing the declined property, getting permission from its owner instead. Vandals often defaced these walls with sarcastic embellishment such as "I Am The Best Fartist" or added simplistic commentary such as "I hate you". IATBA murals which may have been defaced would be faithfully repainted by René.

As the neighborhood went upscale and the value of blank wall space rose with property values, I AM THE BEST ARTIST René murals were one-by-one covered by billboards or otherwise destroyed. One was removed after the landlord demanded $500.00 per month to allow Moncada's mural to remain. René later adapted its abbreviation (IATBA) into a surname of sorts.

== Mott's apple juice controversy ==
During the 1970s, Moncada would become well known in New York art and sex scenes for his artistic representations of female genitalia, making the artist a some-time target of anti-pornographic groups over the years. An ability to pick out subliminally depicted labia from advertisements and elsewhere, whether actual or imagined, was exploited in a recurring magazine article in which René, dubbing himself "Nature's Ambassador", would point out occurrences of "the sacred image" peeking out from, as per one entry, sculptural elements found decorating New York's Central Park.

In the early 1980s, René noticed what seemed to him a subliminal image embedded within the label design of Mott's apple juice cans. The label, showing a detailed rendering of a halved apple, contained what René insisted was an obvious representation of a vagina. René created a painted replica of the can, similar to Andy Warhol's Campbell's Soup artwork. With the full painting standing at 5-feet high, the small detail—otherwise unaltered by the artist—stood out that much more. Screw magazine featured a version of it on the cover of issue #725 and also reported related events which ensued.

René held an exhibition at his own gallery in 1983 showcasing his Mott's painting, among other related works. The artist invited Mott's representatives, fully aware of possible retribution, and welcoming it. René's "Big Apple Show" also displayed the letters sent to Mott's, and their replies. Everyone who attended the opening reception received a poster of René's painted rendition.

A 1981 Village Voice article titled "Apple of Temptation" covered René's Mott's artwork, and Playboy magazine included René in their annual "Year in Sex" review. Mott's redesigned the label soon thereafter, removing any hint of that to which René had drawn attention (pictured), and avoiding any presupposed corporate embarrassment.

If I could sign my checks with a drawing of a vagina, I would, but the bank won't allow it.

— René Moncada

René subsequently created many versions of apples with female genitalia as their core, including drawings, paintings, carvings and other 3-dimensional objects. One version of the apple titled Original Sin, hand-carved into 2-inch-thick wood, was included in the book Forbidden Art, an anthology of similarly themed artworks. René continued to feature vaginas prominently in his artwork—aware it may negatively affect sales and, therefore, gallery interest—even as other artists have achieved broader acceptability by painting euphemistic representations.

As for his use of vaginas in his artwork, René considers it "the purest image". "The shape is a basic structure, a universal image. It's in nature, you can find it everywhere," he explained to The Village Voice. To comments inferring its usage might be considered "monotonous" or "mono thematic", René points out that while others have come and gone, gaining attention by exploiting the image, his interest remains intact, claiming he is "not interested in being shocking and outrageous". In response to criticism contending René shouldn't expose images of a vagina to children, he explains that in this context children wouldn't even know what it is, and, if they did know, it's because someone else has already shown them what it is. "If the kid recognizes it as something bad—obscene, disgusting—it's because somebody put this idea into his head already."

== Sex and Violence ==
René Moncada's predilection for rendering female genitalia culminated in the creation of one of the artist's most infamous images. Created, in René's words, "to liberate art from the dictatorship of religion," Sex and Violence very simply depicted a Christian cross with a vagina at its center. The artist himself conceded to the controversial nature of his own creation, while separately joking about it as a "piece" symbol.

A manifesto printed as a full page in SCREW magazine outlined Rene's ambitions for Sex and Violence. As he also explained to New York Press, René believes he had "united two things that everybody insists on separating. What I have put together is the creation of God to give life to his son, with the creation of men to kill him." The vagina, René continued, represents "love, pleasure and life itself" while the cross represents an "instrument of violence created by man, to kill" or "torture." As he'd done with his Mott's artwork, René obsessively created multiple renditions of the image in a variety of mediums.

=== Anti-censorship proponent ===
René Moncada is a vocal opponent of censorship, hypocrisy and oppression. He has justified some of his actions as a desire to liberate not only the art world but also the world at large. It is these attributes, he supposes, which may qualify him as "the best artist"—artistic skills aside. René blames the susceptibility of people to religious dogma with a return to prudishness and the proliferation of special interest groups, and jokes that censorship has succeeded in making people so stupid that "bowling balls will soon be printed with the instructions For External Use Only".

A 1981 speaking engagement at Fordham University titled "The Facts of Life and How They Affect the Creative Process" was quashed by then-Associate Dean of Students Mary Raddock prior to its presentation on the basis that René displays "insufficient regard for the human body" in his artwork, additionally citing the lack of a university-affiliated sponsor. Even after organizers attained a recognized entity as a sponsor (Fordham's The Monthly publication), Raddock held steadfast in her belief that René's work was inappropriate. Students with knowledge of the event openly denounced the perceived censorship upon learning of its cancellation. Consensus among students proclaimed the right to decide what is indecent or what is art. Raddock denied censorship in an interview with Fordham's The Ram, which reported the turn of events, insisting that one must "show some kind of common sense in these things."

If it wasn't for pornography, I would've been a pervert. René Moncada

In his "AMACA" exhibition ("Artistic Movement Against Censorship in Art"), René unveiled another work of art which incorporates a thought-provoking proclamation within the composition. As both title and headline, Censorship Is The Shield Of The Corrupt appears across the top of the black and white, banner-like composition. Below it, a Christian cross, an Islamic star and crescent, a star of David, and a swastika are depicted side by side as simple graphics. Across the bottom reads Our Fathers Who Art In Heaven, Let Us Art Free On Earth. René describes such vehement anger from viewers that his explanation of the fact that the religious symbols have been responsible for as much death as the swastika often went ignored.

==== 1982 arrest ====
An incident on the steps of St. Patrick's Cathedral involving René's Sex and Violence resulted in the arrest of René and Screw magazine publisher Al Goldstein. For a video shoot staged in July 1982, for Goldstein's Midnight Blue public-access program—during an era when scandals involving Jim and Tammy Bakker, Jimmy Swaggart, and other religious leaders were headline news—René created a large papier-mâché cross of Sex and Violence as a prop. In a scene intended to lampoon religious hypocrisy, Goldstein, dressed as Jesus Christ and carrying René's creation, is ousted from the church by another participant and pushed down the steps.

The shoot attracted disapproving onlookers and police, who ordered the group to cease filming and then proceeded to arrest them, with Goldstein reportedly shouting "Keep filming!" and "Render unto Caesar!" as he was taken into custody. Damage done to René's Sex and Violence cross at the hands of bystanders went uninvestigated by police at the scene.

== Other projects ==
=== Nudismos ===
Nudismos are René's fashion innovation in which the artist hand-weaves outfits directly onto the customer, creating bikinis or dresses of varying length and coverage. René explains the title Nudismos as relating to both the Spanish word for "knot" (nudo) and the English word "nude". Using knots, the outfits are custom fitted to the wearers' contours, covering strategic parts of the body while leaving other areas bare, in an overall motif resembling cobwebs. The more daring the wearer's disposition, the more daring the outfit's coverage. The project attracted a modest amount of attention for the artist in the United States and Venezuela. René staged runway shows in his own gallery to promote his fashions, which were worn by adult video actresses, strippers and would-be models.

=== "E-Vent" at Museum of Modern Art ===
In 1988 René staged another act of "art provocation" at New York's Museum of Modern Art (MoMa) in the spirit of Marcel Duchamp's Dadaist concept of ready-made art. Rene sent out invitations to friends and fellow artists and announced to the media the permanent installation of a new work of René art at the museum. Commandeering an air ventilation grill already installed at the museum—a functioning part of its air conditioning system—René announced to a confused crowd that he thereby claimed the grill as a work of art in his own name. René justified his actions by noting that Duchamp's theory of artists having the authority of claiming found objects as art—acknowledged by the art world via inclusion in museum collections (some on display in adjacent rooms)—gave him the right to claim the ventilation grill. René, in subsequent interviews, continued to express certain pride in the fact that his "artwork" would remain on permanent display at the museum, recognized or not.

==== Found-object sculptures ====
Creating artwork using discarded objects and refuse has been an ongoing interest of the artist, appearing in various guises over time. Embellishing the aluminum skeleton of an upright vacuum cleaner, Rene crafted an unmistakable likeness of a long-barreled rifle. Onto vintage canvas dress forms found on the streets of SoHo, Rene painted flesh tones, including tan lines, and nipples. Rene intuitively reassembled parts of a typewriter into a beetle, years later coming across a photo of one in National Geographic magazine which bore resemblance to his own.

René in 1986 infused eco-political ideology to his "found objects" in Venezuela. Water quality at the country's Lake Maracaibo was suffering greatly due to the proliferation of oil drilling and the dumping of raw sewage. Upon hearing of this, René presided over a congregation to publicize the dismaying conditions. As part of his group's efforts, a blank canvas was placed in the lake until it had absorbed a coating of the oil and sewage present in the water. Unfurled at the entrance to Venezuela's National Art Gallery in Caracas, the heat drew unpleasant odors from the canvas, adding to the episode. In response to orders from authorities to "Clean it up", René countered "No, you clean it up." René became a celebrity of the cause during that time, attracting media attention while also embarrassing the Venezuelan government. He went on to refer to his handiwork sarcastically as both an "oil painting" and a "still life". René also created sculptures of waste accumulated along Venezuelan beaches.

Beginning in the 1990s, René intermittently provided art instruction as a volunteer at institutions such as the Henry Street Settlement and Children's Museum of New York. At a time when Department of Education budget cuts were negatively affecting funding of many such art programs in New York City, René devised what he believed to be a rational plan to assist in gaining funding. The artist's proposal entailed teaching students to create simple yet attractive biomorphic constructions using discarded styrofoam and other cheap materials, then organizing fund-raising drives at which the creations could be auctioned to supporters in what a local newspaper referred to as a "Styrofoam Bailout". René imagined that the sculptures—which require no special training to create—might act as a status symbol, showing that its buyer is a proven supporter of art programs in New York City. In the process, René adds, discipline and self-esteem can be instilled in students, positively influencing their attention span and inherent creative impulses. René had, himself, been creating such sculptures using the same materials since the 1990s, calling the lightweight sculptures Mental Floss, and repurposing found objects to create artwork continues as one aspect of the artist's work.

== Personal ==
René is a naturalized American citizen. René often credits the support of his wife Joanne with allowing him to pursue the life of an artist.

If it wasn't for her I would not be who I became. She spoiled me to death; she gave me everything I wanted. She made my life perfect. Thanks to her I never had to ask for anything twice or kiss anybody's ass to get it.

— René Moncada, "blaming" his wife Joanne for his current state.

== See also ==
- Street art
- Censorship
