= Yara Flor =

- Yara Flor, art by Dan Mora

Publication information
- Publisher: DC Comics
- First appearance: Dark Nights: Death Metal #7 (January 2021)
- Created by: Joëlle Jones

In-story information
- Alter ego: Yara Flor
- Species: Amazon / Demigod
- Team affiliations: Titans; Esquecida; Justice League; Amazons of Themyscira
- Partnerships: Wonder Woman; Donna Troy; Cassandra Sandsmark
- Supporting character of: Wonder Woman
- Notable aliases: Wonder Girl; Wonder Woman
- Abilities: Superhuman strength, speed, stamina, durability, agility, reflexes, and senses; Hydrokinesis; Using Golden boleadoras, Amazonian sword and Kokoshnik tiara

Yara Flor is a superhero appearing in American comic books published by DC Comics. Created by Joëlle Jones, she first appeared in Dark Nights: Death Metal #7 (January 2021). She is one of four characters to use the Wonder Girl codename and appears as a supporting character in Wonder Woman comic book titles and the lead character in the short-lived 2021 Wonder Girl series. She is also portrayed as Wonder Woman in "Future State".

The daughter of an Amazon of Themyscira and a Brazilian river god, Yara was raised in the United States until a trip to Brazil revealed her origin and heritage. Originally training as a champion of Hera, the character instead was selected as a champion of the Esquecida, a tribe of Amazons residing in the Amazon rainforest and created by the moon goddess, Yacy (an adaptation of Jasy Jatere), following a suggestion from Gaea. In general, the character's initial reception was positive, with her appearances in Future State making her a fan-favorite and standout character during the crossover storyline. In Brazil, however, Yara received criticisms since her debut, highlighting offensive stereotypes in her characterization and a lack of authenticity in her Indigenous origin, as well as a lack of consultation to ensure accuracy in the representation of Indigenous Brazilian culture and mythology.

== Publication history ==
Yara Flor's creation began with a trip to São Paulo in 2019 for Comic Con Experience, in which then DC Comics co-publisher Dan DiDio presented the idea of creating an "Amazon from the Amazon" to Joëlle Jones, who accepted the task and began doing research. Jones said the research process was "difficult at times, because most of it's in Portuguese," and that it involved "asking for a lot of help, reading a lot of books, and delving into some strange YouTube channels." Yara was reportedly intended to be part of Didio's 5G project, which was canceled and partially repurposed into "Future State" following his departure from the company.

According to Joëlle Jones, Yara's appearance was inspired by Brazilian model Suyane Moreira. In an interview, Moreira said she was "thrilled, astonished and happy" to inspire the character's appearance, and that she unsuccessfully tried to contact Jones to thank her and learn details of how the artist came across her.

== Fictional character biography ==
The character debuted in January 2021 as part of DC Comic's "Future State" storyline, in which she is shown to be the Wonder Woman of the future. In the present-day DC Universe, Yara is introduced as part of the Infinite Frontier publishing event, where she is initially unaware of her Amazon heritage. Responding to a prophecy that will determine if Yara destroys the Amazons or saves them, the Olympian Gods and the Amazons converge on her location as she travels to Brazil. Hippolyta sends Cassie Sandsmark to protect Yara, where Cassie encounters Artemis of Bana-Mighdall.

Yara trains on Mount Olympus, learning to fight using a bola. She befriends a pegasus, naming him Jerry. Eros intends for Yara to drink the elixir of immortality so she can be with him forever. However, Yara convinces Eros to let her come back to the mortal realm to meet a man whom she had feelings for named Joao. Yara meets a Brazilian Amazon named Potira, who explains that Yara's mother was a Greek Amazon who fell in love with a man and gave birth to her. An Amazon tribe in Brazil took Yara's family in until Ares killed her mother. Cassie Sandsmark and Artemis eventually find Yara, who is informed that the Amazons will eventually be destroyed if she sides with Hera.

Hera asks Yara to drink ambrosia, which will render her immortal. She declines and fights her way out of Olympus. During the chaos, Jerry is hurt by Pegasus; Yara comes back to Mount Olympus to take revenge, but Hera defeats her and sends her to Hephaestus. Yara Flor meets Wonder Woman for the first time, helping her close the gate while investigating the murder of Hippolyta.

In Dark Crisis #1, Jon Kent tries to convince Yara to join his new Justice League team after Pariah kills all the current Justice League members. Yara rebukes Jon's offer and leaves him. Yara returns after Deathstroke attacks the Titans Tower, and learns from Alan Scott and Swamp Thing that Pariah is corrupting the Great Darkness. She participates in the final battle with Dick Grayson's group, distracting Pariah long enough for Jace Fox and Mister Terrific to defeat Pariah.

Yara Flor helps the superheroes defeat Nezha during the events of Lazarus Planet, and makes several appearances in Tom King's Wonder Woman run helping Wonder Woman deal with the Sovereign.

Yara Flor appears in the 2026 New Titans comic series, where she is Cyborg's first pick to help save the original Teen Titans, alongside Jon Kent, Stephanie Brown, Terra, and Red Devil, who are later joined by the android Eva and Static. In the story arc Spirit of the Amazon, Yara and the Titans travel to the Amazon rainforest to confront local deforestation and help the Esquecidas, encountering the cryptid Minhocão (lit. "Big Earthworm") and the DC-original jaguar spirit Yaguara during the adventure.

== Powers and abilities ==
As an Amazon-Tupi demigoddess, Yara inherits abilities the average Amazon does not. Yara has superhuman strength, speed, reflexes, durability, agility and senses. Yara also has the ability of hydrokinesis, which she discovers after she gets her golden bolas. Yara also rides a white winged horse from Olympus named Jerry.

== Critical reception ==
The character was received positively by both fans and critics, with critics naming Yara Flor the standout from "Future State". Samantha Nelson from Polygon wrote "DC's clearly betting big on Yara, but her debut shows tremendous promise. It's a glimpse at a new version of Wonder Woman that's grounded in modern fantasy as much as superhero comics, providing ammo for a huge number of thrilling new stories." Nelson, however, also noted Yara "unfortunately embodies the fiery Latina stereotype," but hoped the character would become more depthful in future stories.

In Brazil, Yara Flor and the stories she starred in drew controversy in regards to the representation of Brazilian and Indigenous people. Yara herself was considered to be a perpetuation of offensive stereotypes, such as the aforementioned "fiery Latina," with her quick-to-anger personality and oversexualization being cited as core parts of the issue.

Pataxó journalist and activist Alice Pataxó publicly bashed Future State: Wonder Woman #1 on the day it was published, defining Yara as "white ego talking" and criticizing the fact no Indigenous people were involved in her creation, which led to cultural inaccuracies. She also brought attention to the blending of different Indigenous cultures, and the disrespect and demonization towards Indigenous religions. A moment in the issue where Yara ties up and belittles sacred forest guardian Caipora was also criticized, being compared to racist "Índia pega no laço" (lit. "Indian woman caught by the lasso") imagery.

In response to criticisms, Joëlle Jones, Yara's creator, apologized and said she was "heartbroken" and "gutted to hear some people might be offended by the content [of Future State: Wonder Woman #1]," explaining all questions would be answered in the ongoing series Wonder Girl, released later in that same year and set in the mainline DC Universe. In the series, which was also criticized for continued cultural inaccuracies, it was revealed Yara, while born in Brazil, was actually raised in Boise, Idaho, and thus disconnected from her home country. Emma Singer from CBR described the reveal as an "attempt to excuse some of these issues" that "only made matters worse." Singer also reported fans found "the plot [of Wonder Girl] and Yara's character dull."

== In other media ==
- The CW, Greg Berlanti, and Dailyn Rodriguez intended to develop a Wonder Girl TV series focusing on Yara Flor. However, The CW decided not to move forward with the series as of February 2021.
- Yara Flor as Wonder Woman appears in DC Legends.
- Yara Flor appears as a playable character in DC Worlds Collide.
