= I Am the Best Artist =

Murals by René Moncada in New York City

I AM THE BEST ARTIST René
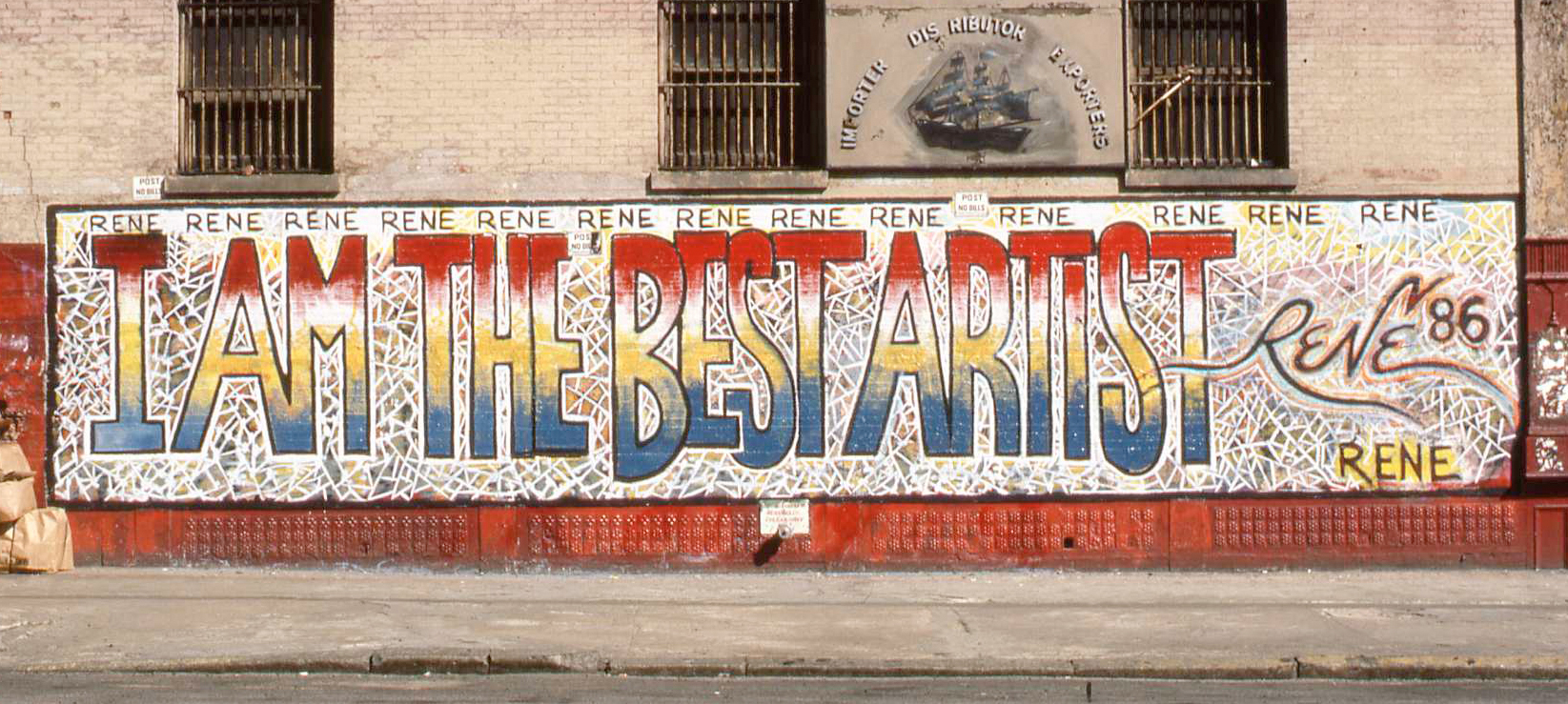
- West Broadway between Spring and Broome Streets, 1986
- Artist: René Moncada
- Year: c. 1970s–1990s
- Type: Mural series
- Medium: Paint
- Location: multiple; SoHo, New York City

Beginning in the late 1970s, and continuing into the 1990s in New York City, several prominently located murals of impressive size proclaimed I AM THE BEST ARTIST to all who walked or drove past them along the streets of SoHo. The murals were the creations of artist René Moncada, who lived in the neighborhood.

René Moncada's I AM THE BEST ARTIST murals became icons not only of the neighborhood's art world associations but of the era in general, when art became a profitable commodity and SoHo became its Wall Street. The murals have been likened to effective advertising slogans and recognized as an early act of "art provocation". The murals placed René at the forefront of street artists of the era and helped transform the streets of the art district into an alternative exhibition venue.

== Background ==
If you have not seen that sign, you have nothing to do with art or you've never been to SoHo.

— René Moncada, SoHo; The Rise and Fall of an Artist's Colony

René has described the murals as a thumb in the nose to the art community he helped pioneer but by which he later felt ignored. The artist — a very vocal opponent of censorship, hypocrisy and oppression — explains some of his activities as stemming from a desire to liberate not only the art world but also the world at large. It is attributes such as that, he has reflected in hindsight, which may qualify him as "the best artist", having nothing to do with artistic skills.

René's ubiquitous declarations, spelled out in large, capital letters punctuated by his signature "René" written in a flowing font, were a topic of conversation and debate at the time, and provided a backdrop to photographs taken by a multitude of tourists, art students and advertising layouts in magazines worldwide.

== Locations ==
Mural locations were centered along the stretch of West Broadway between Houston Street and Canal Street. The most prominent mural, near the corner of Broome Street and West Broadway (pictured above), measured 10 by 50 ft (3.0 by 15.2 m). The largest of the murals was located on a wall along the southwest corner of West Broadway where Grand Street intersects. This location appears in a montage sequence of the 1987 movie The Secret of My Success, in which a young Cindy Crawford makes an un-credited appearance walking past the mural, catching the eye of the lead character played by Michael J. Fox. The mural was featured prominently among other iconic images of 1980s New York City in general, and SoHo in particular. Another prominent mural spanning the length of a parking lot wall on Wooster Street was painted at a height so that it would be visible above parked cars. René's gallery space and home was across the street from this lot.

== Conflicts and criticism ==
René always insisted he obtained permission from landlords to paint the murals, but requests were also sometimes refused, with some SoHo residents commenting that although a mural would be welcome on their property, an I AM THE BEST ARTIST mural would not be welcome. In the case of one refusal, René painted the attendants' stand of the parking lot facing the declined property, getting permission from its owner instead. Another dispute involved a French artist named Le Pointre who tried to claim use of a wall for which René insisted he'd already obtained permission to paint a mural.

Vandals often defaced these walls with sarcastic embellishment such as "I Am The Best Fartist" and "I Am The Best Anus", or added simplistic commentary such as "No No No" or "I hate you". Graffiti artists of the era also occasionally obscured the murals with their own work. IATBA murals which may have been defaced would be faithfully repainted by René.

René claims the art critic Robert Hughes once assured him directly that he was not, in fact, the best artist. An Artforum writer used an unrelated art review to shine a negative light on The Best Artist, calling René "untalented" and "unchic". Loss of long-time artist friends was another unfortunate consequence.

=== Legal case ===
One of the murals located along West Broadway was across the street from a gallery owned by Lynn Rubin. René claimed to have obtained permission from the owner of the building to paint the mural at that location. When it came to his attention that Rubin was having her staff paint over the mural, René arrived to videotape them. Rubin tried to stop him from recording, and it was then, René alleges in a lawsuit filed against her, that she assaulted him by pushing the camcorder into his face, causing him hardship and suffering. The outcome of the lawsuit was not published, but René's murals, and the related legal proceedings, raised discussion about intellectual property, artist's rights, and the First Amendment.

== IATBA Gallery ==
René opened his storefront space at 147 Wooster Street, SoHo, as "René's Gallery" in 1977. He opened it to showcase his own artwork — a "monument to himself", as described by John Strausbaugh in a New York Press article of the era — and also used the space to the rear of the gallery as his studio. As René's signature murals gained notoriety, his gallery was also called "I AM THE BEST ARTIST gallery". The gallery was also the site of fashion shows, events by performance artists such as Annie Sprinkle, and exhibitions of artwork by, among others, ballpoint pen artist Lennie Mace, whose exhibition publicity listed the gallery indistinctly as 147 Wooster Gallery. René naively thought opening his own gallery would earn entry into the burgeoning SoHo art set, and went about inviting neighboring gallery owners to come for studio visits or private viewings, but his invitations — and presence in general — went largely ignored.

== End of the murals ==
As the neighborhood went upscale and the value of blank wall space rose with property values, I AM THE BEST ARTIST murals were one-by-one covered by billboards or otherwise destroyed in the 1990s. One was removed after the landlord demanded $500 per month to allow René's mural to remain. René later adapted the phrase's abbreviation (IATBA) into his signature – and a surname of sorts. René no longer occupies his long-time Wooster Street space.

== See also ==
- Street art
