= Mike Carlin =

American comic book artist

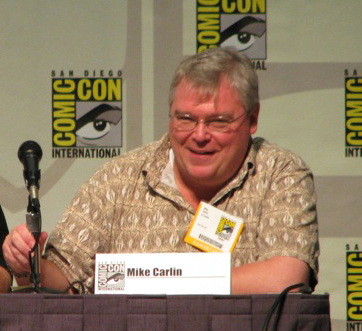
- Mike Carlin at San Diego Comic-Con in 2007
- Born: Michael Carlin; October 6, 1958 (age 68)
- Areas: Writer, Penciller, Editor
- Notable works: Superman
- Awards: Eisner Award for Best Editor; Inkpot Award (1994)

Michael Carlin (born October 6, 1958) is an American comic book writer, editor, and executive. He has worked principally for Marvel Comics and DC Comics since the 1970s. Mike has been married to Janice Cohen since 2005.

== Early life ==
Carlin attended the High School of Art and Design in Manhattan, graduating in 1976. He received a Bachelor of Fine Arts in Cartooning from the School of Visual Arts in New York in 1980.

== Career ==
Mike Carlin started out in the business at DC Comics as a high school intern in 1974. He was hired by Marvel Comics as a writer and artist on Crazy Magazine, the company's black-and-white humor title at the end of 1980. His first work appeared in print in 1981. He later became an assistant editor under Mark Gruenwald in 1982 and wrote a short run of stories in Captain America and Ka-Zar as well as the Assistant Editors' Month issue of Marvel Team-Up (Aunt May and Franklin Richards vs. Galactus). Carlin moved to DC Comics as of October 6, 1986, his 28th birthday, and became group editor of the Superman titles. He oversaw "The Death of Superman" storyline and the subsequent introduction of such characters as Superboy (Kon-El) and John Henry Irons. From 1996 to 2002, he served as an executive editor at DC Comics. As of 2011, he was DC Entertainment's Creative Director of Animation.

== Appearances within comics ==
The backup story "Bernie America, Sentinel of Liberty" in Captain America #289 (Jan. 1984) features Mike Carlin dressed as The Watcher, introducing the story.

The Batman Adventures #13 features a screwball trio of incompetent super-villains: the Mastermind (a caricature of Carlin), The Perfessor (a caricature of Dennis O'Neil), and Mr. Nice (a caricature of Archie Goodwin).

Superman: The Man of Steel #75 (Jan. 1998) is a pastiche of Superman's death in Superman vol. 2 #75 (Jan. 1993), where Mister Mxyzptlk creates a duplicate of Doomsday. The confrontation culminates with Mxyzptlk meeting the Supreme Being, who turns out to be Carlin.

== Awards ==
- 1994 Eisner Award for Best Editor, for the Superman titles
- 1994 Inkpot Award

=== Nominations ===
- 1992 Eisner Award for Best Editor, for the Superman titles and The Psycho

== Bibliography ==
=== DC Comics ===
- Batman: Gotham Knights #21 (Batman Black and White) (2001)
- Cartoon Network Presents #8 (1998)
- Flashpoint: The Canterbury Cricket #1 (2011)
- Flintstones and the Jetsons #1–2 (1997)
- Green Lantern Annual #3 (1987)
- Green Lantern Corps Quarterly #8 (1994)
- Metal Men vol. 2 #1–4 (1993–1994)
- Secret Origins vol. 2 #33 (Mister Miracle) (1988)
- Showcase '95 #2, 6 (1995)
- Star Trek #41–47 (1987–1988)
- Star Trek: The Next Generation #1–6 (1988)

=== Marvel Comics ===
- Amazing High Adventure #1 (1984)
- Bizarre Adventures #34 (1983)
- Captain America #301–306 (1985)
- Crazy Magazine #72, 74, 80, 83–92 (1981–1982)
- Daredevil #202 (1984)
- Dazzler #32–34 (1984)
- Ka-Zar the Savage #28–34 (1983–1984)
- Marvel Fanfare #39 (Moon Knight) (1988)
- Marvel Team-Up #137 (1984)
- Masters of the Universe #1–8 (1986–1987)
- Peter Porker, the Spectacular Spider-Ham #4, 11, 13–14, 17 (1985–1987)
- The Thing #14–17, 23–36 (1984–1986)

Preceded by Bruce Jones	Ka-Zar the Savage writer 1983–1984	Succeeded by n/a
Preceded by J. M. DeMatteis	Captain America writer 1984–1985	Succeeded by Mark Gruenwald
Preceded by Andy Helfer	Action Comics editor 1987–1996	Succeeded by KC Carlson
Preceded by Andy Helfer	Adventures of Superman editor 1987–1996	Succeeded by KC Carlson
Preceded by Andy Helfer	Superman vol. 2 editor 1987–1996	Succeeded by KC Carlson
Preceded by n/a	Superman: The Man of Steel editor 1991–1996	Succeeded by KC Carlson
Preceded by Dick Giordano	DC Universe Executive Editor; 1996–2002	Succeeded by Dan DiDio
