= Dan Raspler =

Writer

- Areas: Writer, Editor
- Awards: "Best Editor" Eisner Award (1997)

Dan Raspler is an editor and writer of comic books for DC Comics. In the late 1990s, he created the series Young Heroes in Love.

== Awards ==
- 1997: Won "Best Editor" Eisner Award, for Kingdom Come, Hitman, The Spectre, Sergio Aragonés Destroys DC

== Personal life ==
Raspler is the cousin of writer Chris Claremont's current wife. Raspler was editor on JLA during the six-issue "Tenth Circle" story arc Claremont and John Byrne wrote in 2004. Dan co-designed the game Space Cadets:Away Missions for Stronghold Games released in 2015.
