= Sensory: Life on the Spectrum =

2022 comic anthology by Bex Ollerton

- Date: October 18, 2022
- Publisher: Andrews McMeel Publishing
- Editor: Rebecca "Bex" Ollerton
- ISBN: 978-1524874766

Sensory: Life on the Spectrum is a 2022 comic anthology edited by Bex Ollerton. It features 53 comics about autism, all by autistic creators.

== Development ==
Most of the comics featured in the anthology were created for #ASDComicTakeover, a hashtag on Twitter for Autism Acceptance Month in April 2021.

== Contents ==
- Better Now Than Never by Emma O'Friel
- Two Bridges Apart by Arian Sebastian Farzad and Laila Ahamad
- Consent is Beautiful by Suzanne Wdowik
- Overwhelm by Chloe F. McKay
- How I Found Sense by Allie
- Cover for Me by Alice Williams
- Things That Help by Matt Crane
- Greater Understanding by Buddy O. Baker
- 54321 by Dean McColl
- Until There Was Nothing Left by Noel Fox
- Masking and Mirroring by Bex Ollerton
- Fly by Jo Svensson
- Autism and Me: What You'll Find by Rhia May-Byrd
- Behind the Wheel by Angelina Eddins
- How I Fit Into the World by Charlie Watts
- Home by Almond
- Halfway by Dominique Morris
- The Truth Behind Asperger's by Micaela Wainstein
- Masking in Autism by Mell Stansel
- Going Outside by Jinx Peregrine
- Retreat by Alicia Wedderburn-Graham and Bex Ollerton
- Things I Didn't Know by Laila Ahamad
- Special Interests: The Ups and Downs! by Ash Ortiz
- Accepting my Autism by Reloaxa
- Compliments by Kayla Gilliam
- Theatre by PJ Fairweather
- Autobiography by Jo Blakely
- Burn Out by Kyle Lewis
- Clothing Language by Lindsay Miller
- Battery by Nova Kahan
- Tips for Autistic Adult Life by T Catt
- The Special Interest Suplex by CJ Barrett and Toria McCallum
- Infantilization of Autistic Women by Alexandra McCarthy
- Meeting My Needs by Molly McCracken
- Music Waves by Michiums
- Sparks by Katie Cunningham and Alice Williams
- Of Fairy Lights and Change by C. A. Crisóstomo
- Autistic Joy by Taylor Reynolds
- Autism Soup by Cy Popps
- Getting Autism Diagnosed by T Catt and Allie
- Self-diagnosis by Bex Ollerton
- Hurting and Helping by Shay Commander
- Autism and Jobs by Rhia May-Byrd
- Triple-A by Jo Svensson
- Autistic Person by Cy Popps
- Autistic Burnout by Dominique Morris
- Seeing Ourselves by Kai Mycelium
- Rejection Sensitive Dysphoria by Bex Ollerton
- Community: On Autism, Race, and Representation by Alicia Wedderburn-Graham and Micaela Wainstein
- What Day Is It? by Dominique Morris
- Sharing Your Story by Arian S. Farzad and Alexandra McCarthy
- The Wrap Up Alicia Wedderburn-Graham
- Autistic Pride by Bex Ollerton

== Reception ==
Andy Oliver of Broken Frontier dubbed Sensory: Life on the Spectrum "a fascinating compilation of lived experiences that provides unique personal insights into so many different facets of the subject." The book was awarded the 2022 Broken Frontier Award for Best One-Shot Anthology by the website.

Martha Cornrog of Library Journal concluded that the work was "a wide-ranging and emotionally rich introduction to the circumstances of people with autism," further stating it would be "useful for high schoolers as well as adults."

The Journal of Literary & Cultural Disability Studies described the book as being targeted towards autistic readers yet accessible to non-autistic ones, and noted the collection "benefits from exploring a variety of different autistic experiences, highlighting how not all autistic people are the same."

=== Accolades ===
Year	Award	Category	Result	Ref.
2021	Eisner Award	Best Anthology	Shortlisted	
2021	Ringo Award	Best Anthology	Shortlisted	
