= Joëlle Jones =

American comic book artist and writer

- Jones at GalaxyCon San Jose in 2026
- Born: February 20, 1980 (age 46) Boise, Idaho, United States

Joëlle Jones (born February 20, 1980) is an American comic book artist and writer, best known for her work on Lady Killer, a series published in 2015–2017 by Dark Horse Comics, for her cover work on various Marvel Comics series, and for her work writing and illustrating DC Comics series including Batman and Catwoman.

== Early life ==
Joëlle Jones is a native of Boise, Idaho. She attended the Pacific Northwest College of Art, where she studied oil painting. She left school to pursue comic book illustration. She stayed in the Portland, Oregon area for several years, where she worked as a freelance artist for Dark Horse Comics and Oni Press.

== Career ==
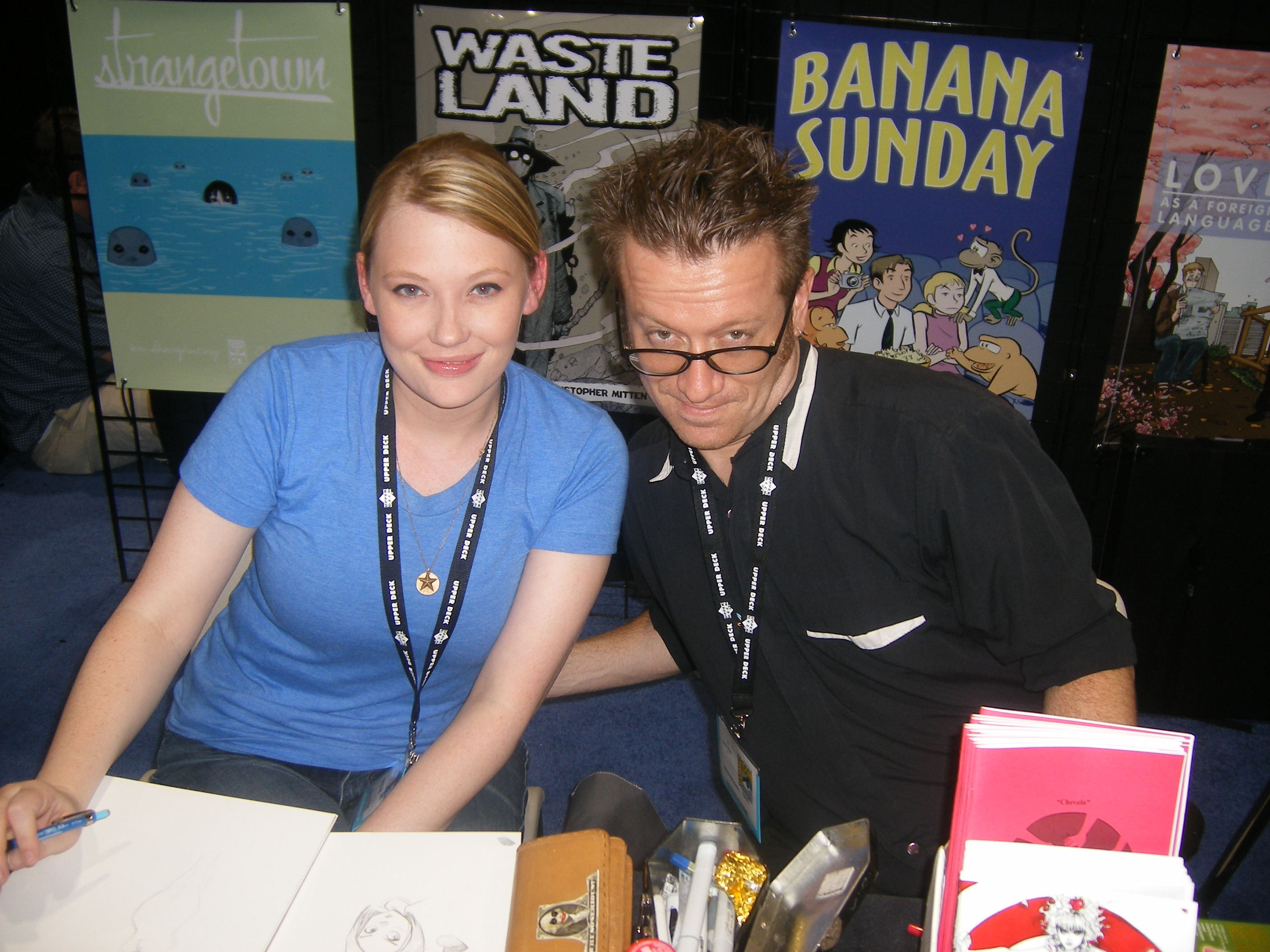
Joëlle Jones and Jamie S. Rich at the 2007 San Diego Comic-Con

Jones's first credited work was as a colorist for Harris Comics in 2004, back when the company had the rights to Vampirella. In 2006, her illustrations appeared in the anthology Sexy Chix, published by Dark Horse Comics. The following year, she drew "How are the new Three Little Pigs adjusting to being pigs?", which appeared in Fables #59, a fantasy series published by the DC Comics imprint Vertigo. She returned to the Fables universe in 2015 with "The Last Geppetto Story" (which appeared in Issue 150) and Fables: The Wolf Among Us Digital Issue 26.

Jones and writer/editor Jamie S. Rich collaborated on the 2006 Oni Press book 12 Reasons Why I Love Her (2006), her first long-form work. She and Rich would later collaborate on other Oni series, including You Have Killed Me (2009) and Spell Checkers (2010-2013). In 2008, Minx (a short-lived DC Comics imprint) published the graphic novel Token, which was written by Alisa Kwitney and illustrated by Jones.

In 2010, Dark Horse published Troublemaker, a graphic novel continuation of Janet Evanovich's Barnaby series; Jones created the artwork. Troublemaker was released in two parts and then released as a collected trade paperback in 2011. In 2015 Dark Horse Comics published Lady Killer, a miniseries Jones illustrated and co-wrote with Rich about a 1960s housewife who moonlights as an assassin, later collected in trade paperback form. In 2016, Jones received three Eisner Awards nominations for her work on Lady Killer and on Brides of Helheim: Best Limited Series, Best Penciller/Inker, and Best Cover Artist.

During the 2010s, Jones continued illustrating titles published by Oni Press, including House of Night, Helheim, and Brides of Helheim. She also illustrated the graphic novel adaptation of The Girl Who Owned a City, which was published in 2012 by Graphic Universe.

In 2016 Jones wrote Lady Killer 2, a five-issue sequel miniseries to the 2015 miniseries, taking on sole writing duties on the title. In September 2017, artwork inspired by Jones's style was used as part of the runway backdrop at Prada's spring 2018 exhibition in Milan.

In 2015 and 2016, Jones illustrated and sometimes drew covers for several issues of Marvel Comics's Mockingbird, Spider-Woman, Scarlet Witch, and Ms. Marvel.

Jones participated in DC Talent Development Workshop in early 2016 as a writer. New Talent Showcase 2016 #1, which featured her Harley Quinn story, was published that November.

At the DC Press Breakfast held during the July 2016 San Diego Comic-Con, DC announced that Jones signed an exclusivity contract with the publisher.

Between 2016 and 2017, Jones illustrated the four-part DC series Supergirl: Being Super written by Mariko Tamaki.

On March 30, 2017, DC announced that her artwork would be used as the basis for a new series of statues in their Cover Girls line, making her the first female designer of the line. The first four statues were released in 2018, depicting the characters Harley Quinn, Batgirl, Supergirl, and Mera. Subsequent statues were released of Catwoman, Black Canary, Wonder Woman, and Huntress.

In July 2017, DC announced that Jones would draw both the covers and interior art for the DC Rebirth version of Batman, starting with issue #33, making her the first female artist to draw covers and interior pages on more than two consecutive Batman-centric issues in the character's history.

In April 2018, DC announced that Jones would write and draw a new Catwoman series. The first issue was released on July 4, 2018, the same day as Batman #50, which depicted Batman and Catwoman's wedding. The issue also featured the first appearance of the villain Raina Creel, the First Lady of Villa Hermosa. Jones is the regular writer on the series, and also drew the first six issues.

In 2021, following the events of Dark Nights: Death Metal, Jones created the character of Yara Flor / Wonder Girl who was featured in the Future State event before making her appearance in the DC Universe proper in Wonder Girl #1 in 2021.

In February 2022, Jones came under fire for reportedly tracing Pepe Larraz's art for her work on Trial of the Amazons.

In April 2023, Jones became one of the founding members of the comic book company DSTLRY.

In January 2024, it was announced that Jones would serve as one of the artist for the 2024 relaunch of the IDW Teenage Mutant Ninja Turtles series written by Jason Aaron.

== Personal life ==
As of 2017, Jones is based in Los Angeles.
