= Andy Helfer =

American comic book creator (born 1958)

- Born: Andrew Helfer; August 17, 1958 (age 68)
- Areas: Writer, Editor
- Notable works: The Big Book Of; Deadman; The Shadow
- Awards: Eisner Award – Best Anthology; 1995 The Big Book of Urban Legends

Andrew Helfer (born August 17, 1958) is an American comic book creator best known for his work as an editor and writer at DC Comics, where he founded the Paradox Press imprint.

== Career ==
Andy Helfer joined DC Comics in 1981 and assisted Joe Orlando in the special projects department. He became editor of the Justice League of America title with issue #245 (December 1985) and oversaw the title's revamp into Justice League International in 1987 by Keith Giffen, J. M. DeMatteis, and Kevin Maguire. Helfer edited The Man of Steel limited series by John Byrne and the subsequent relaunch of the Superman titles. As a writer, Helfer collaborated with artist José Luis García-López on a Deadman limited series in 1986 and with artist Bill Sienkiewicz on an ongoing series for The Shadow in the following year. Following Sienkiewicz's departure from The Shadow, Kyle Baker became the artist on the series and he and Helfer also produced a two-issue Justice, Inc. series. The Helfer-Baker run on The Shadow was cancelled in 1989 allegedly due to objections by Condé Nast, the character's owner, to the tone of the series. Helfer wrote for the Superboy television series from 1988 to 1990. As the editor of Paradox Press, Helfer oversaw the development of Max Allan Collins' series Road to Perdition and John Wagner's A History of Violence, both of which became successful films. In 2006, Helfer collaborated with artist Randy DuBurke on Malcolm X: A Graphic Biography (2006) which has been recommended as part of a "Suggested Core List of Graphic Novel Titles for High School Students". He wrote the Presidential Material: John McCain one-shot biographical comic book for IDW Publishing in 2008.

== Personal Life ==
Andy Helfer has a daughter, Emilia, born in 2010. She is a well-known artist and Tik-Tok user. Andy has an extensive comic book collection which is the largest in New York City.

== Awards ==
- 1991:
  - Nominated for "Best Script" Haxtur Award, for Justice, Inc.
  - Nominated for "Best Long Comic Strip" Haxtur Award, for Justice, Inc.
- 1995:
  - Won "Best Anthology" Eisner Award, for The Big Book Of Urban Legends
  - Nominated for "Best Editor" Eisner Award, for The Big Book Of Urban Legends
- 1997: Nominated for "Best Editor" Eisner Award, for Gon and The Big Book Of Little Criminals

== Bibliography ==
=== DC Comics ===
- 9-11: The World's Finest Comic Book Writers & Artists Tell Stories to Remember, Volume Two (2002)
- Atari Force #8, 12, 15–17, 20 (1984–1985)
- Batman Annual #14 (1990)
- Batman Black and White #3 (1996)
- The Batman Chronicles #9 (1997)
- Batman: Journey Into Knight #1–12 (2005–2006)
- Deadman vol. 2 #1–4 (1986)
- Fast Forward #1 (1992)
- Heroes Against Hunger #1 (1986)
- The Hidden Killer #1 (1998)
- Judge Dredd #1–12 (1994–1995)
- Judge Dredd: The Official Movie Adaptation (1995)
- Justice, Inc. vol. 2 #1–2 (1989)
- Legends of the DC Universe 80-Page Giant #1 (Hawkman) (1998)
- Robotech Defenders #1–2 (1985)
- Secret Origins vol. 2 #15 (Deadman), #18 (Creeper), #40 (Detective Chimp) (1987–1989)
- The Shadow vol. 3 #1–19, Annual #1–2 (1987–1989)
- Solo #6 (2005)
- Supergirl giveaway comic from Honda and the United States Department of Transportation about auto safety and seat belts (1984)
- Swamp Thing vol. 2 #101 (1990)
- The Unexpected #219 (1982)

=== Farrar, Straus, and Giroux ===
- Malcolm X: A Graphic Biography #1 (2006)

=== IDW Publishing ===
- Presidential Material: John McCain #1 (2008)

Preceded by Alan Gold	Justice League of America editor 1985–1987	Succeeded by n/a
Preceded by Julius Schwartz	Action Comics editor 1987	Succeeded by Mike Carlin
Preceded by Julius Schwartz	Adventures of Superman editor 1987	Succeeded by Mike Carlin
Preceded by n/a	Superman vol. 2 editor 1987	Succeeded by Mike Carlin
Preceded by n/a	Justice League International editor 1987–1992	Succeeded by Brian Augustyn
Preceded by n/a	Justice League Europe editor 1989–1992	Succeeded by Brian Augustyn
Preceded by Bob Schreck	Batman: Legends of the Dark Knight editor 2000–2004	Succeeded by Harvey Richards
