= Jamie S. Rich =

American comic book editor and writer

- Areas: Writer, Editor
- Awards: Eisner Award for Best Anthology (2017)

Jamie S. Rich is an American author of both prose and graphic novel fiction, a web series host, and editor of comic books. He was formerly an Executive Editorial Director at IDW Publishing.

== Career ==
=== As writer ===
His first published work was the novel “Cut My Hair”, or originally published in 2000 and reprinted in 2002. Beginning in 2006 his first graphic novel, 12 Reasons Why I Love Her was released with art by Joëlle Jones. In the following years Rich has released subsequent works in both prose and graphic art formats in a variety of genres from Oni Press, as well as Dark Horse Comics, and Image Comics. He has also written single-issue comic book stories for Marvel and DC Comics. Plus, at Image Comics, the 12 issue series It Girl & The Atomics.

=== From the Gutters/Back to the Gutters ===
In 2013, Rich launched the web series “From the Gutters”. A series of nine long-form interviews with comics industry talent. The follow-up series, “Back to the Gutters” ran for ten episodes starting in 2016.

=== Editorial ===
His editorial career began in 1994 as Assistant Editor to Bob Shreck at Dark Horse Comics before becoming the editor for Mike Allred’s Madman Comics at Dark Horse before moving on to Oni Press in 1998. There, Rich took on the role of Editor in Chief, eventually leaving Oni in 2004.

After a period of time as a freelance writer, Rich joined DC Comics in 2015 as a Senior Editor for DC’s Vertigo imprint, and became Group Editor for Vertigo and Young Animal in 2016. Following that in 2018, he became Group Editor for the Batman and Justice League titles, and eventually the Superman titles.

Rich left DC in 2021 to become Editor in Chief at Tapas Media, a short-format web comics publisher.

In early 2022, he moved to IDW Publishing to become the publisher's current Executive Editorial Director.

After a corporate restructuring in May 2023, Rich was promoted to Editor-In-Chief at IDW.

He then left IDW for an unannounced role elsewhere.

== Published works ==
=== Novels ===
- Cut My Hair (Crazyfish 2000/Oni Press 2002)
- I Was Someone Dead (Oni Press 2005)
- Have You Seen the Horizon Lately? (Oni Press 2007)

=== Graphic novels ===
- 12 Reasons Why I Love Her (Oni Press 2006)
- You Have Killed Me (Oni Press 2009)
- Spell Checkers Volume 1 (Oni Press 2010)
- Spell Checkers Volume 2: Sons of a Preacher Man (Oni Press 2011)
- Spell Checkers Volume 3: Careless Whisper (Oni Press 2013)
- A Boy and a Girl (Oni Press 2013)
- It Girl and the Atomics Volume 1 (Image 2013)
- It Girl and the Atomics Volume 2 (Image 2013)
- Madame Frankenstein (Oni Press 2014)
- Archer Coe - The Thousand Natural Shocks (Oni Press 2014)
- Ares & Aphrodite: Love Wars (Oni Press 2015)
- Lady Killer Volume 1 (Co-Written with series creator Joëlle Jones) (Dark Horse 2015)
- Archer Coe - The Way to Dusty Death (Oni Press 2018)

== Awards ==
In 2017, Rich shared the Eisner Award for Best Anthology for editing the graphic novel Love is Love, a co-publishing collaboration between IDW and DC Comics. A tribute to the victims of the Orlando nightclub shooting.
