= Trickster: Native American Tales, A Graphic Collection =

Anthology of Native American stories

Trickster: Native American Tales, A Graphic Collection is an anthology of Native American stories in the format of graphic novels. Published in 2010 and edited by Matt Dembicki, Trickster contains twenty-one short stories, all told by Indigenous storytellers from many different native nations. The premise of each short story is to teach a moral lesson or explain how certain natural events happen. All stories contained within the anthology are tales that have been told orally for centuries within Native American tribes. As the title of the collection suggests, each story contains a character that is known and depicted as a Trickster. This character is the main focus of the story and is typically depicted as an animal figure. Many of the tales such as, Coyote and the Pebbles and Rabbit and the Tug-of-War depict the trickster in a more well-known form of a coyote or rabbit. Lesser known characters are depicted as the trickster throughout the remaining stories such as the raven in Raven the Trickster and the racoon in Espun and Grandfather.

Although each story within the collection is a Native tale, most of the illustrations were done by a non-native artist. The style of each graphic novel ranges from realistic to child-like illustrations, to detailed paintings. Due to these unique differences in illustration styles, Matt Dembicki worried about the cultural origins of some stories getting lost in the artwork. To prevent this ‘westernization’ of the Indigenous tales, illustrations were preapproved by the storytellers as to not have the overall motif distorted.

== Indigenous graphic novels ==
Starting in the 1800s, political cartoons were utilized to further dehumanize Indigenous peoples of North America. The graphic novel format reclaims the art form while simultaneously challenging negative stereotypes depicted in media and providing positive representation for native youth. However, anthologies such as these struggle with the decontextualization of their stories through the isolation of the Tricksters from the culture in which their stories come from and aid in the creation of a single archetype of "the Trickster." Background on the writers and illustrators are provided in the "Contributors" section at the end of the novel, but are not always noted within the content of the story.

Other indigenous graphic novel anthologies include Moonshot: The Indigenous Comics Collection, edited by Hope Nicholson, Stories of Our People: A Métis Graphic Novel Anthology, edited by Norman Fleury, Deer Woman: An Anthology, edited by Elizabeth LaPensée and Weshoyot Alvitre, Sovereign Traces, Volume 1: Not (Just) (An)Other, edited by Gordon D. Henry Jr. and Elizabeth LaPensée, and Tales of the Mighty Code Talkers, edited by Arigon Starr.

== Short stories ==
Titles (in order of appearance)	Author	Illustrator
Coyote and the Pebbles	Dayton Edmonds	Micah Farritor
Dayton Edmonds, a member of the Caddo Nation, shares a story about the creation of stars and why coyotes howl.
Raven the Trickster	John Active	Jason Copland
John Active, a Yup'ik from Western Alaska, shares a story about the eventful day of devious Raven.
Azban and the Crayfish	James and Joseph Bruchac	Matt Dembicki
James and Joseph Bruchac of the Abenaki peoples share a story about crayfish—how they have eyes on stalks and why they are not prideful.
Trickster and the Great Chief	David Smith	Jerry Carr
David "Tim" Smith of the Winnebago Tribe of Nebraska shares a story about how owls became the guardians of the dead.
Horned Toad Lady and Coyote	Eldrena Douma	Roy Boney Jr.
Eldrena Douma, a Pueblo Indian who grew up on the Laguna and Hopi reservations, shares a story about impatient Coyote and the singing Horned Toad Lady. Horned Toad Lady and Coyote is illustrated by Roy Boney Jr. of the Cherokee Nation.
Rabbit and the Tug-of-War	Michael Thompson	Jacob Warrenfeltz
Michael Thompson of the Muscogee (Creek) Nation shares a story about how Rabbit bested two Buffalo in a tug-of-war.
Moshup's Bridge	Jonathan Perry	Chris Piers & Scott White
Jonathan Perry, a member of the Wampanoag Tribe of Gay Head in Aquinnah, Massachusetts, shares a story which tells of the creation of Nomans Land off the coast of Martha's Vineyard Island and the stones jutting out of the ocean visible from the cliffs from Aquinnah.
Rabbit's Choctaw Tail Tale	Tim Tingle	Pat Lewis
Tim Tingle of the Choctaw Nation of Oklahoma shares a story about how chatty Rabbit got his powder-puff tail.
The Wolf and the Mink	Elaine Grinnell	Michelle Silva
Elaine Grinnell, a member of the Jamestown S'Kallam Tribe located on the North Olympic Peninsula of Washington, shares a story about hungry, prideful Mink and clever Wolf.
The Dangerous Beaver	Mary Eyley	Jim Coon (Jim8ball)
Mary Eyley of the Cowlitz tribe in southern Washington shares a story about five brothers who try to defeat the old man Beaver.
Giddy Up, Wolfie	Greg Rodgers	Mike Short
Greg Rogers, a member of the Choctaw/Chickasaw Nations, shares a story about Chuckfi, a clever rascal rabbit, and how he wooed girl-wolf Nashoba-Tek.
How the Alligator Got His Brown, Scaly Skin	Joyce Bear	Megan Baehr
Joyce Bear of the Muscogee Nation shares a story about how beautiful and smooth, selfish and proud Alligator got his scales.
The Yehasuri: The Little Wild Indians	Beckee Garris	Andrew Cohen
Beckee Garris of the Catawba Nation shares a story about Yehasuri, leprechaun-sized trickster beings.
Waynaboozhoo and the Geese	Dan Jones	Michael J. Auger
Dan Jones of the Ojibwe tribe shares a story that tells of why geese fly in V-shape patterns.
When the Coyote Decided to get Married	Eirik Thorsgard	Rand Arrington
Eirik Thorsgard, a member of the Confederated Tribes of Grand Ronde, shares a story that details the events following Coyote's decision to get married and explains the creation of the rock pillars that run along the Columbia Gorge.
Puapualenalena, Wizard Dog of Waipi'o Valley	Thomas C. Cummings Jr.	Paul Zdepski
Thomas C. Cummings Jr., a Native Hawaiian, shares a story about Puapualenalena and how he outsmarted troublesome spirits to retrieve a sacred conch-shell trumpet.
Ishjinki and the Buzzard	Jimm Goodtracks	Dimi Macheras
Jimm Goodtracks of the Ioway/Otoe tribes shares a story that explains how Buzzard became the first vulture after a fateful encounter with Ishjinki. Ishjinki and the Buzzard is illustrated by Dimi Macheras, a Chickaloon Village tribal member.
The Bear Who Stole the Chinook	Jack Gladstone	Evan Keeling
Jack Gladstone of the Blackfeet Indian Nation from Montana shares lyrics that explain why Bear hibernates during the winter.
How Wildcat Caught a Turkey	Joseph Stands With Many	Jon Sperry
Joseph Stands With Many, a member of the Cherokee Nation, shares a story about how Rabbit helps Wildcat catch a turkey.
Espun and Grandfather	John Bear Mitchell	Andy Bennett
John Bear Mitchell of the Penobscot Nation located in Maine shares a story about Espun, a light-footed, curious creature whose questionable decisions led him to become the first raccoon.
Mai and the Cliff-Dwelling Birds	Sunny Dooley	J. Chris Campbell
Sunny Dooley, a member of the Navajo tribe located in Chi Chil' Tah, New Mexico, shares a story about a coyote named Mai who was never satisfied with what he had and his journey in learning to fly.
