= Bronwyn Carlton =

American comic book writer

Bronwyn Carlton is an American comic book author, editor, and radio DJ. She has written a number of DC Comics titles, including Catwoman and The Books of Faerie, as well as the Paradox Press imprint title, The Big Book of Death.

She has worked as an editor for both DC and Marvel. At DC, she worked on both the Paradox Press and Piranha Press imprints. At Marvel, she worked on the Marvel Knights line.

In 2008, she was featured in the documentary film Guest of Cindy Sherman.

She was also a DJ for WFMU, a free-form radio station in New Jersey. She has hosted various shows from late 1988 through 2017. These include "Truck Stop Tea Party" and "Sportsy Talk with Bronwyn C. & Jim the Poet."

From October 6, 1989–October 2, 1990, Carlton wrote a regular weekly column called "Myster Date" for the New York Press weekly newspaper.

Carlton has spoken publicly about her experience with "prosopagnosia" ("face blindness"), and is an advocate for recognition of that condition as a disability.

== Personal life ==
Ms. Carlton attended Reed College in Portland, Oregon, where she earned a Bachelor's degree in psychology/animal behavior. She is married to illustrator Sean Taggart (since 1991).

Preceded by John Ostrander	Catwoman writer 2000–2001	Succeeded by John Francis Moore
