= Paradox Press =

Former division of DC Comics

- Parent company: DC Comics
- Status: Defunct (2001)
- Predecessor: Piranha Press
- Founded: 1993
- Country of origin: United States
- Headquarters location: New York City
- Key people: Andrew Helfer; Bronwyn Carlton; Jim Higgins; Heidi MacDonald
- Publication types: Graphic novels

Paradox Press was a division of DC Comics formed in 1993 after editor Mark Nevelow departed from Piranha Press. Under the initial editorship of Andrew Helfer and Bronwyn Carlton, the imprint was renamed. Paradox was best known for publishing the graphic novels A History of Violence and Road to Perdition, both of which were later adapted into feature films. Jim Higgins edited the line after Helfer's departure, and Heidi MacDonald briefly took the helm in 2000 at the time of the line's final three Big Books, none of which ever saw publication.

== History ==
Paradox Press was designed to publish graphic novels that were not of the superhero genre (as comprises most of DC's publishing efforts) and without the fantasy and sci-fi elements of DC's "mature reader" line Vertigo Comics.

Because of the limited interest in non-fantasy stories among the graphic novel demographic, the line produced only a handful of books over its decade-long history. While almost all received critical acclaim, none reached high sales amongst the general graphic-novel and comic book reading populace. Two of the imprint's books — A History of Violence and Road to Perdition — were adapted into successful films, and Scott McCloud's Understanding Comics (originally published through Kitchen Sink Press) is considered one of the authoritative bibles of the medium. The true-life anthology series of Big Books also found a niche following. The Big Book Of series was an anthology series, each devoted to a theme or concept, e.g., The Big Book of Conspiracies and The Big Book of Urban Legends.

The imprint was phased out after attracting low sales, and most of the books under the Paradox label are out of print for the foreseeable future. Those books that have remained in print were rereleased under DC's more lucrative Vertigo label.

== Books ==
Below is a list of books published under the Paradox Press logo:

- The Big Book Of:
  - the '70s
  - Bad
  - Conspiracies
  - Death
  - Freaks
  - Grimm
  - Hoaxes
  - Little Criminals
  - Losers
  - Martyrs
  - Scandal!
  - Thugs
  - the Unexplained
  - Urban Legends
  - Vice
  - the Weird Wild West
  - Weirdos
- The Bogie Man
- Brooklyn Dreams
- Family Man
- Gon:
  - Gon
  - Gon on Safari
  - Gon Swimming
  - Gon Underground
  - Gon Wild!
- Green Candles
- A Gregory Treasury
- A History of Violence
- Hunter's Heart
- La Pacifica
- The Project
- Reinventing Comics
- The Remarkable Worlds of Professor Phineas B. Fuddle
- Road to Perdition:
  - Road to Perdition
  - Road to Perdition: On the Road
    - On the Road to Perdition Book 1: Oasis
    - On the Road to Perdition Book 2: Sanctuary
    - On the Road to Perdition Book 3: Detour
- Stuck Rubber Baby
- Understanding Comics

In addition, several magazines entitled Weird collected reprint material from the above volumes.

== Unpublished work ==
Slated for 2001 Paradox Press had intentions to release a book known as The Big Book of Wild Women. From time to time mentions of this book can be found on the internet. The book is narrated by "Susie the Floozie". The book was to profile notable women throughout history who had made an impact on American culture while pushing the envelope of unconventional behavior. Among the women to be profiled were risqué nightclub singer-comic Rusty Warren, B-movie goddess Tura Satana, presidential candidate Victoria Woodhull, 19th century sex star Lola Montes, legendary seductress Cleopatra, scandalous writer Anaïs Nin and kinky pin-up icon Bettie Page. DC comics stated at the time that the book was in a perpetual "pre-production".
