= Japanese popular culture =

Japanese popular culture includes Japanese cinema, cuisine, television programs, anime, manga, video games, music, and doujinshi, all of which retain older artistic and literary traditions; many of their themes and styles of presentation can be traced back to traditional art forms. Contemporary forms of popular culture, much like the traditional forms, are not only forms of entertainment but also factors that distinguish contemporary Japan from the rest of the modern world. There is a large industry of music, films, and the products of a huge comic book industry, among other forms of entertainment. Game centers, bowling alleys, and karaoke parlors are well-known hangout places for teens while older people may play shogi or go in specialized parlors. After the Meiji Restoration, Japan adopted European and American culture. Today, Japanese popular culture plays a major role in the country's soft power, tourism, and economy, standing as one of the most widespread and famous popular cultures around the world. As of 2023, Japan's overseas exports of cultural content recorded 5,776.9 billion yen ($36,4 billion). As of 2025, Japan's overseas exports of cultural content recorded 6,963.4 billion yen ($43,9 billion). By 2025, Japan’s revenue from the overseas sale of content and pop culture had officially surpassed the export value of traditional Japanese goods such as steel and semiconductors. In terms of foreign currency inflow, this industry now ranks behind only the automotive sector and international tourism.

== History ==
In as early as 1920, a discussion revolving around the use of culture and media communication was being used as a strategy to enhance the international understanding of Japan's perspective was set in place. The discussion began when Japan aspired to become an imperial and colonial power, one that was equivalent to their Euro-American counterparts. This idea was interrupted once Japan was defeated in World War II. With the economic struggles Japan faced after the war, the question about using culture and media communication was once again brought up. In order for Japan to reinvent themselves and improve foreigners' impression of them, Japan focused on projecting a selected national image by exporting appealing cultural products including, animation, television programs, popular music, films, and fashion. The public diplomacy wanted to allow other countries to understand their position on various issues by acting directly on the people of foreign countries. With the popularity of television emerging in Asian countries, they produced a show that was supposed to demonstrate the actual lives of Japanese people.

Before the popular television show Oshin aired in Asian countries, Japanese people were perceived as 'culturally odorless.' With this new TV drama, a sense of commonality began to form between Japan and other Asian nations. This show was a testimony to the capability media culture can have on enhancing the international understanding of negative historical memories of Japanese colonialism and the hostility regarding the country's economic exploitation of the region.

The entertainment industry was vital to Japan's postwar reconstruction. The desire to create fantasies was present but, the economy drove the entertainment industry. Technology was the heart of Japan's rebuilding since, they believed it was the only reason they lost the war. Pop culture began to dominate the entertainment industry. For example, Japan used the resources they had in order to make toy cars that ultimately helped them rebuild the economy. After Japan was banned from using metal to make toys, they used old cans instead. In doing so, they were able to produce toys in exchange for food for the school children. The toy industry is just one of the industries that ultimately influenced pop culture during this era.

Prior to World War II Japanese cinema produced films that supported the war efforts and encouraged Japanese citizens to fight for their country. The movie industry produced inspirational patriotic tales that portrayed Japanese militia as victors, heroes, and people who sacrificed themselves for a greater cause. However, the first cinematic blockbuster of the postwar era was Godzilla which, did not share the same support as other films. For Japan, this film represented a return to popular entertainment that catered to the move towards technology. Godzilla showed the destruction of Tokyo and the atomic bomb that victimized Japan during the war in order to gain opposition towards the war. Japanese cinema was dominated by militaristic storytelling and was controlled by the policies and agendas of Japan's totalitarian state. Films during the postwar era were used to foster new idols and icons in order for Japanese people to begin to reimagine themselves. Japanese cinemas produced films that demonstrated why they should be against the war and all the destruction and casualties that came along with it. As time went on the film industry progressed from targeting adult audiences to targeting children. Since the 1990s, when the Japanese economy suffered a prolonged recession, narratives of psychosocial angst have manifested widely in Japanese popular culture.

== Cool Japan ==
Cool Japan (クールジャパン Kūru Japan) refers to the rise of Japan's soft power and prevalence internationally as a cultural influence. These cultural elements project a message that markets and packages Japan as a nation of commerce and "pop culture diplomacy" as opposed to a militarily focused and driven country. Japan's actions during World War II made it necessary for the nation to rebuild their national image; moving away from a national image of military dominance and into an image of cultural diplomacy. Initiated by the Japanese government, the creation of the "soft power" image emerged, and Japan began to sell its pop culture as its new non-military image in order to promote its own culture and reestablish a healthy and peaceful diplomacy with other nations.

== Otaku ==
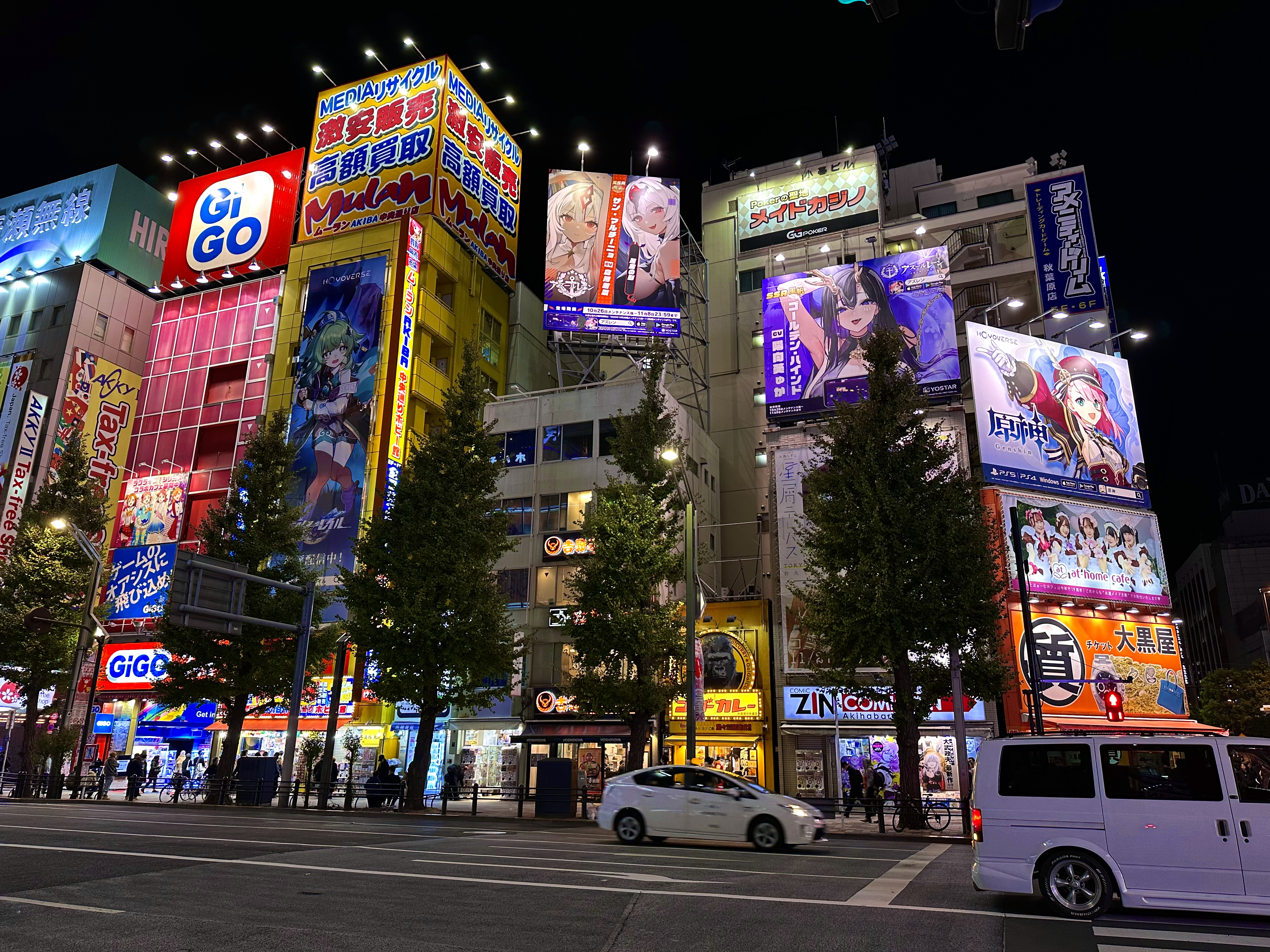
Akihabara neighborhood, one of the most popular gathering sites for otaku

Otaku (Japanese: おたくor オタク) is a Japanese term that describes people with consuming interests, particularly in anime, manga, video games, or computers. The otaku subculture has continuely grown with the expansion of the Internet and media, as more anime, video games, shows, and comics were created and an increasing number of people now identify themselves as otaku, both in Japan and elsewhere.

== Kawaii ==
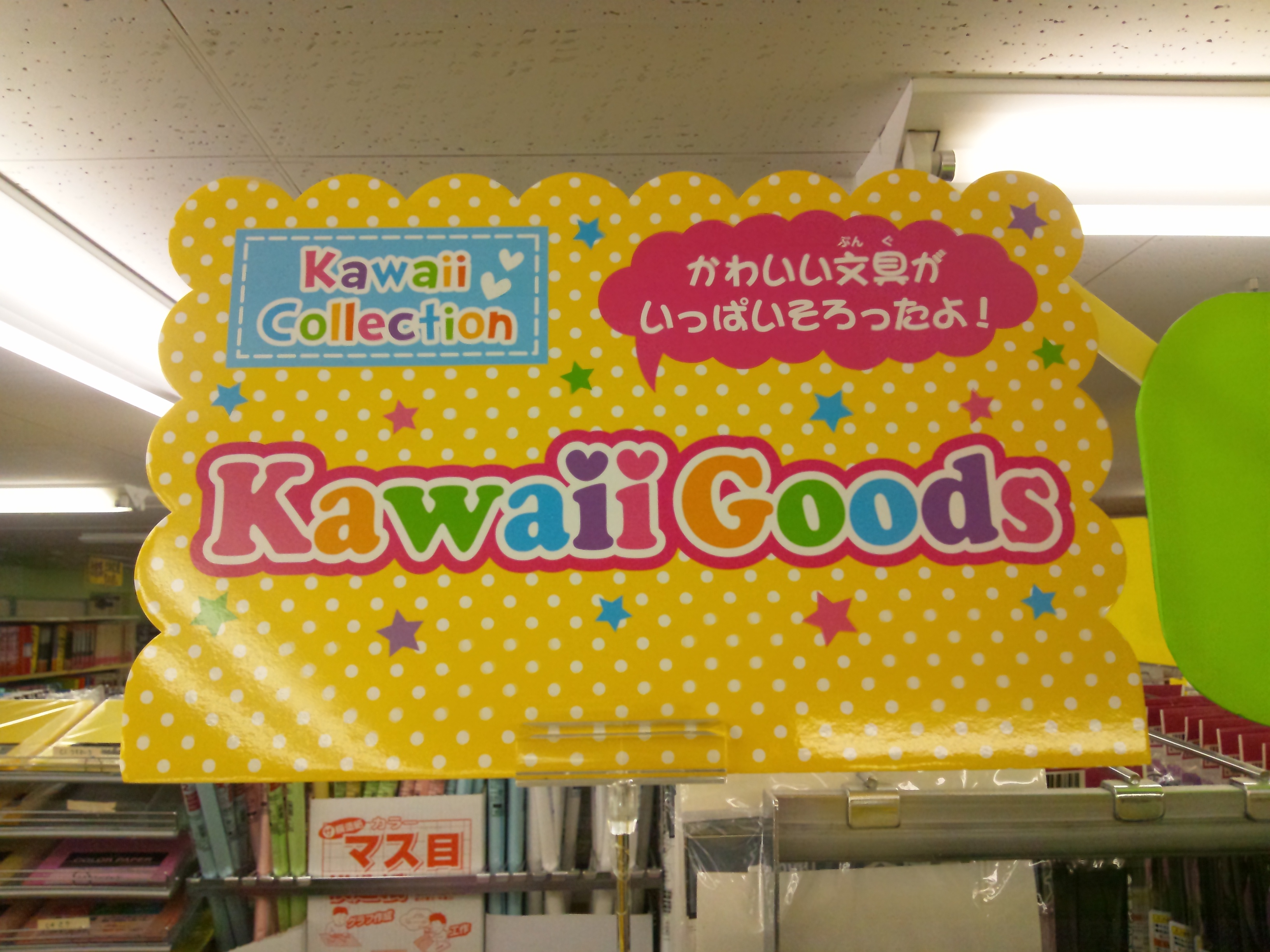
Sign used to sell kawaii goods at a shop in Japan

The Japanese adjective kawaii can be translated as "cute" or "adorable" and is the drive behind one of Japan's most popular aesthetic cultures. Kawaii culture has its ties to another culture called shōjo, a girl power type movement that has been commodified to sell the image of young girls alongside pop culture and the goods they might be interested in. Shōjo can be seen as Japan's version of "the girl next door" with the cute and innocent aspects of kawaii. It has been associated with fancy goods (frilly and feminine type goods marketed toward young females), character goods (Sanrio, San-X, Studio Ghibli, anime/manga merchandise, etc. marketed to both males and females), entire fashion movements, and idols. As long as a product or person has "cute" elements, it can be seen as kawaii. In 2008, Japan's Ministry of Foreign Affairs moved away from just using traditional cultural aspects to promote their country and started using things like anime and Kawaii Ambassadors as well. The purpose of the Kawaii Ambassadors is to spread Japanese pop culture through their cute personas, using mostly fashion and music. This can also happen at the local level as seen by the mayor of Shibuya designating Kyary Pamyu Pamyu as the "Kawaii Ambassador of Harajuku", famously known as a hub of Japanese fashion, clothing stores, and youth culture.

=== Mascots ===
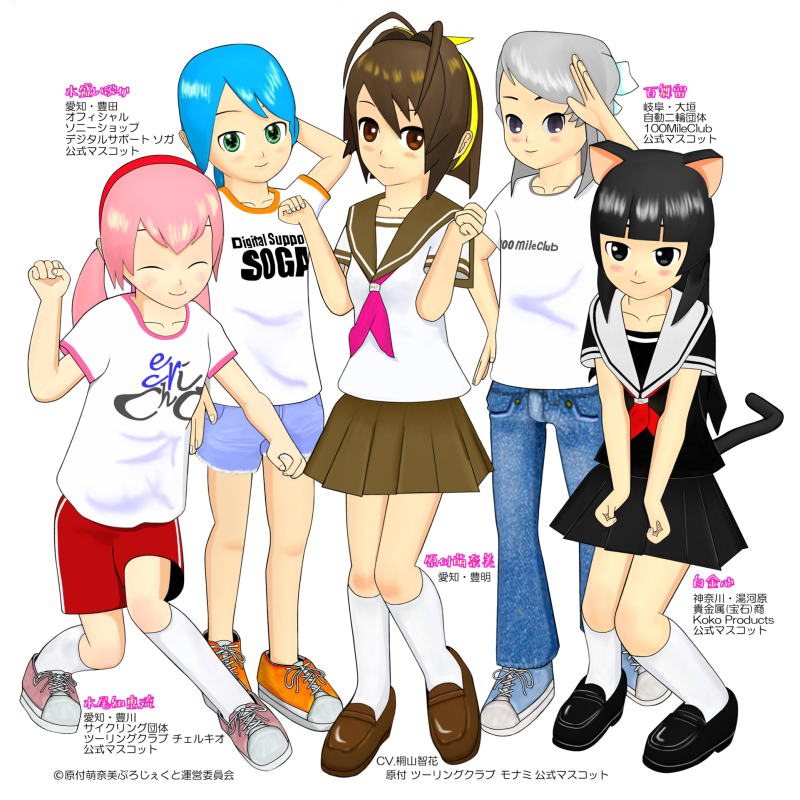
An example of Japanese commercial mascots

Kawaii in Japan has been a growing trend for many Japanese markets; they have been used in a range of spaces ranging from schools all the way to large enterprises. The use of cute, childish figures representing certain groups allows for those potentially frightened by them to have these playful mascots that represent them to create a sense of humanity between them. An example would be the Tokyo Metropolitan Police Department mascot known as Pipo-kun, which is an orange-skinned, elfin creature with rabbit ears that are made to listen to the people and an antenna to stay in tune with what is happening. The use of Kawaii in public relations has been a large factor for many and will continue to be used by those who want to have an optimistic view of them.

One type of mascot in Japan noted for their 'Kawaii-ness' are advertising characters known as 'yuru-kiyara' (mascots representing their respective prefectures). Each year Japan celebrates a new winner; for example, 2011's champion was Kumamon (the Mon Bear) of Kumamoto prefecture, pulling in more than 2.5 billion yen in merchandise sales across the nation that year.

=== Purikura ===
Purikura, a Japanese shorthand for "print club", are Japanese digital photo sticker booths. It has roots in Japanese kawaii culture, which involves an obsession with beautifying self-representation in photographic forms, particularly among females. By the 1990s, self-photography developed into a major preoccupation among Japanese schoolgirls, who took photos with friends and exchanged copies that could be pasted into kawaii albums.

Purikura originate from the Japanese video game arcade industry. It was conceived in 1994 by Sasaki Miho, inspired by the popularity of girl photo culture and photo stickers in 1990s Japan. She worked for a Japanese game company, Atlus, where she suggested the idea, but it was initially rejected by her male bosses. Atlus eventually decided to pursue Miho's idea, and developed it with the help of a leading Japanese video game company, Sega, which later became the owner of Atlus. Sega and Atlus introduced the Print Club (Purinto Kurabu), the first purikura, in February 1995, initially at game arcades, before expanding to other popular culture locations such as fast food shops, train stations, karaoke establishments and bowling alleys. The success of the original Sega-Atlus machine led to other Japanese arcade game companies producing their own purikura, including SNK's Neo Print in 1996 and Konami's Puri Puri Campus (Print Print Campus) in 1997.

Purikura produced what would later be called selfies. A purikura is essentially a cross between a traditional license/passport photo booth and an arcade video game, with a computer that is connected to a colour video camera and colour printer, and which allows the manipulation of digital images. It involves users posing in front of a camera within the compact booth, having their images taken, and then printing the photos with various effects designed to look kawaii. It presents a series of choices, such as desired backdrops, borders, insertable decorations, icons, text writing options, hair extensions, twinkling diamond tiaras, tenderized light effects, and predesigned decorative margins. These photographic filters were similar to the Snapchat filters that later appeared in the 2010s. Purikura became a popular form of entertainment among youths in Japan, and then across East Asia, in the 1990s.

== Japanese idols ==
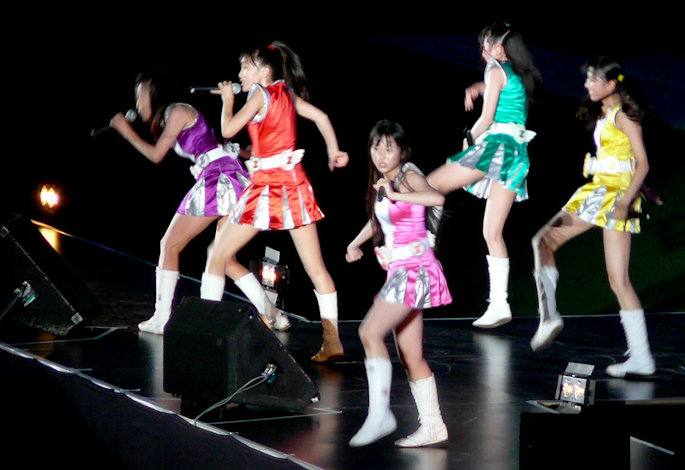
Momoiro Clover Z is ranked as number-one among female idol groups according to 2013–2017 surveys.

Japanese popular culture often focuses on celebrities who appear in many forms of media. One common type of celebrity is the idol. Many young female idols are portrayed as "cute" and "innocent." Idols are often presented as people whom fans can admire. They are also expected to maintain a positive public image and set a good example for young people.

Idols aim to play a wide range of roles as media personalities (tarento), e.g. pop or J-pop singers, panelists of variety programs, bit-part actors, models for magazines and advertisements. Alternative media idols include the emerging net idol, a form of idol in which growing ones popularity on the internet is its base foundation. Many net idol groups create a large standing online before transferring their career towards the professional Music Industry.

Momoiro Clover Z was ranked as the number one female idol group in 2013–2017 surveys. During 2016, about 636,000 attended their live concerts, which was the highest record of all female musicians in Japan. The group has been ranked as the most popular female idol group from 2013 to 2017.

The interactions between the Idols and their fans range from live video streaming, concerts, and handshake events. Because of their promotion as Idols, these celebrities appeal to many different demographics throughout Japan. The emotional attraction to cuteness, including the cuteness these idols have, is seen all over the world. However, the cute kawaii culture is openly visible throughout Japanese society both visually in manga, fashion, and stuffed animals and internally in situations such as the relationship between idols and their fans.

== Fashion ==
Japan began to emulate Western fashion during the middle of the 19th century. By the beginning of the 21st century, this emulation has formed street fashion, a fashion style in which the wearer customizes outfits by adopting a mixture of current and traditional trends. Such clothes are generally home-made with the use of material purchased at stores.

At present, there are many styles of dress in Japan, created from a mix of both local and foreign labels. Some of these styles are extreme and avant-garde, similar to the haute couture seen on European catwalks.

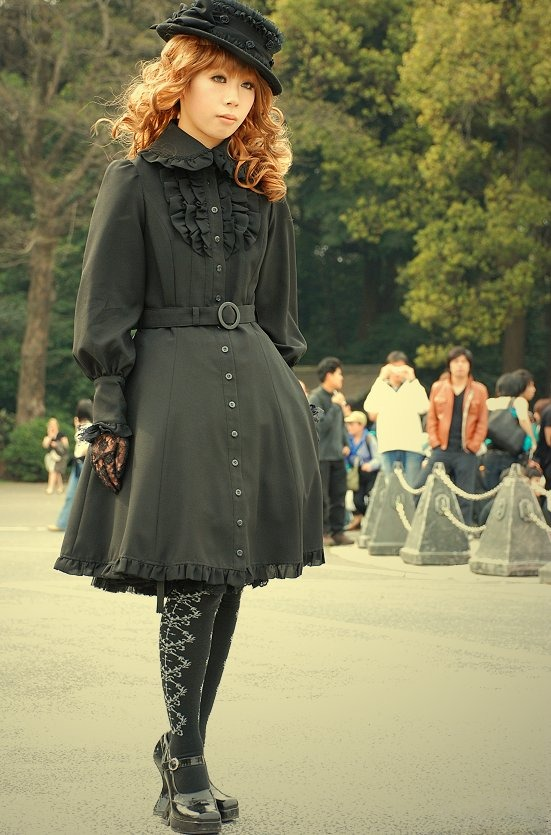
Gothic Lolita Japanese fashion

Though the styles have changed over the years, street fashion is still prominent in Japan today. Young adults can often be found wearing subculture attire in large urban fashion districts such as Harajuku, Ginza, Odaiba, Shinjuku and Shibuya.

== Geinōkai ==
Geinōkai (Japanese:芸能界), meaning "entertainment world" or "the world of show business", encompasses a wide variety of Japanese entertainment from movies and television (including talk shows, music shows, variety shows, etc.) to radio and now the Internet. Geinōjin is a term, often used interchangeably with tarento (タレント), which refers to members of the Geinōkai. Talent refers to a rather large group of people who appear on television from night to night, but cannot be quite classified as actors, singers, or models, or comedians (and are thus given the more vague appellation of "talent" instead). Talents usually appear on variety shows or talk shows and may later move into acting or singing if they are successful.

== Television ==
=== Modern television history ===
The demand for television had changed by the mid-1980s and the commonly viewed dramas such as family-oriented, historical, or mystery declined in popularity. These changes in demand were seen in national television throughout the world. Japan countered this decrease in demand by bringing in new celebrities known as "tarento" (タレント). These tarento celebrities are individuals whose influence stretches over different forms of entertainment such as contestants or hosts in game shows, commercials, or television dramas.

Japanese tokusatsu superhero shows and franchises have had a significant influence on global popular culture. Examples include the Ultraman franchise, the Kamen Rider franchise where some shows were localised as Saban's Masked Rider and Kamen Rider Dragon Knight in the West, the Super Sentai franchise which was localised as Power Rangers in the Western world, and the Metal Hero franchise where some shows were localised as VR Troopers and Big Bad Beetleborgs in the West. They are also series that are either based on elements of some series or parody known franchises, including some sentai shows that feature elements from Super Sentai.

=== Television dramas ===
In the western world, dramas are known to be pieces of literature or plays that have a shocking twist or conflict that causes conflicting endings. However, in Japan, a television drama or "terebi dorama" (テレビドラマ) is commonly thought of as a "Television Show" which can include drama, romance, and or comedy.

== Film ==
The kaiju film genre, which features giant monsters and beings such as Godzilla, Gamera, and Ultraman, has become one of Japan's most prevalent film genres since the 1950s, around the same time that science fiction films such as Invasion of the Body Snatchers (1956), and The Blob (1958), were booming in the United States. kaiju is a subgenre of tokusatsu, a genre that encompasses all Japanese films using practical special effects, except for films using only computer-generated imagery (CGI). Tokusatsu is credited to Eiji Tsuburaya, who is regarded as one of the most influential special effects directors of all time, having co-created the Godzilla franchise as well as Ultraman.

Japanese cinema also gained international recognition in 1950 with the release of Rashomon, which remains one of the most well-known Japanese films. The film's director, Akira Kurosawa is one of the world's most acclaimed and influential film directors. Several of his subsequent films, such as Seven Samurai (1954) and Ran (1985), are considered among the greatest films ever made. Other noteworthy directors in this era of Japanese cinema include Yasujirō Ozu, Masaki Kobayashi, Kenji Mizoguchi, Kon Ichikawa, Keisuke Kinoshita and Ishirō Honda.

The following Japanese film genres have had a significant influence on global popular culture:

- Tokusatsu (Japanese films using special effects)
  - Kaiju (giant monster films) – examples include Godzilla, Gamera and Ultraman
- Jidaigeki (Japanese historical fiction)
  - Samurai cinema (chanbara) – examples include Akira Kurosawa films such as Seven Samurai, The Hidden Fortress and Yojimbo
  - Ninja fiction – see Ninjas in popular culture
- Anime films – see Anime section below
- Japanese horror – examples include the Ring and Grudge franchises

== Anime ==
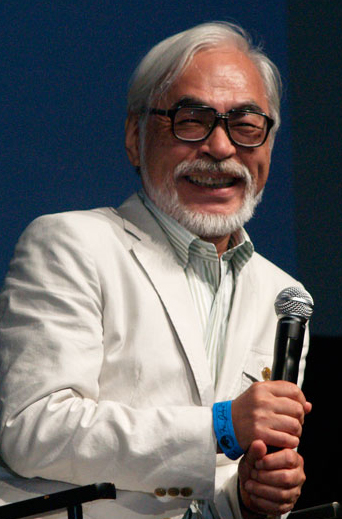
Hayao Miyazaki, the president of Studio Ghibli an influential Japanese anime director whose works have won both critical and popular acclaim. Miyazaki has won the Academy Award for Best Animated Feature twice at the Oscars throughout his career with Spirited Away and The Boy and the Heron.

Logo of anime studio MAPPA. The studio is known for producing numerous iconic anime series such as Jujutsu Kaisen, Yuri on Ice, Hajime no Ippo: Rising, Chainsaw Man and the fourth season of Attack on Titan.

Anime (Japanese: アニメ) is a movie or television episode of sorts which utilizes animation as an art style iconic to Japan in order to convey a story. Unlike western cartoons, anime can be distinguished by its detail in character design, large array of facial expressions, in-depth character development, and wide target audience. These traits are used in order to better the connection between a viewer and the characters. Most of the time, anime is based on animated comics called manga, which is an ancient form of comic writing which dates back to the 12th century.

Anime are often classified by target demographic, including children's (子供, kodomo), girls' (少女, shōjo), boys' (少年, shōnen), young men (青年, Seinen), young women (女性, josei) and a diverse range of genres targeting an adult audience. Shōjo and shōnen anime sometimes contain elements popular with children of all genders in an attempt to gain crossover appeal. Adult anime may feature a slower pace or greater plot complexity that younger audiences may typically find unappealing, as well as adult themes and situations.

The world of animated films in Japanese popular culture has been a growing trend since the 1920s. Influenced by Walt Disney and his animated characters, Osamu Tezuka (1925–1989), also known as "manga no kamisama" (which means, "God of Comics") would begin his forty-year evolution of animation, or anime, that would change the content of Japanese comic books. With the creation of his first animated character Astro Boy that was unlike any other animated character; he found the hearts of the Japanese public with a robotic boy who has spiky hair, eyes as big as fists, with rockets on his feet. Doraemon gained great popularity in Japan with the broadcast of Doraemon on TV Asahi in 1979. In 2008, he was appointed as anime ambassador by the Ministry of Foreign Affairs of Japan.

Studio Ghibli, a Japanese animation film studio, also contributed to anime's worldwide success through films including My Neighbor Totoro, Ponyo, and Spirited Away (winner of the Golden Bear award in 2002 and the Academy Award for Best Animated Feature in 2003). For these works, the studio's current president Hayao Miyazaki is often credited as a visionary in animation. As anime has grown in its variety of viewers, genres, and themes, the industry has become more prevalent in society. In modern Japan, anime has become so popular that memorable characters have frequently been made into byproducts such as figurines and video games.

The success of the Pokémon franchise has been credited by people such as Nissim Otmazgin and sociologist Anne Alison as popularizing anime in the United States. The anime market has also been described as owing greatly to the crucial role of fans as cultural agents, the deterritorializing effects of globalization, the domestication and heavy editing of anime to suit local tastes, and being part of the wider global flow of Japanese pop culture and "soft power". Otmazgin argues that the rise of anime in the United States is a result of the sophisticated graphic quality, a wide thematic diversity, and an inclination to reject the Disney convention of a happy ending. He further states that anime was a tool in which Japan has gained popularity with its pop culture and gave Americans a taste of something unique and interesting in the media.

Since its inception anime has become an essential part of the Japanese entertainment industry, gaining global popularity with the rise of foreign dubbed, subtitled programming, distribution on movie theaters and streaming services, subsequently generating billions of dollars in revenue from international audiences each year.

The growing worldwide popularity of anime has also led to various animation studios from other countries making their own anime-influenced works.

== Manga ==
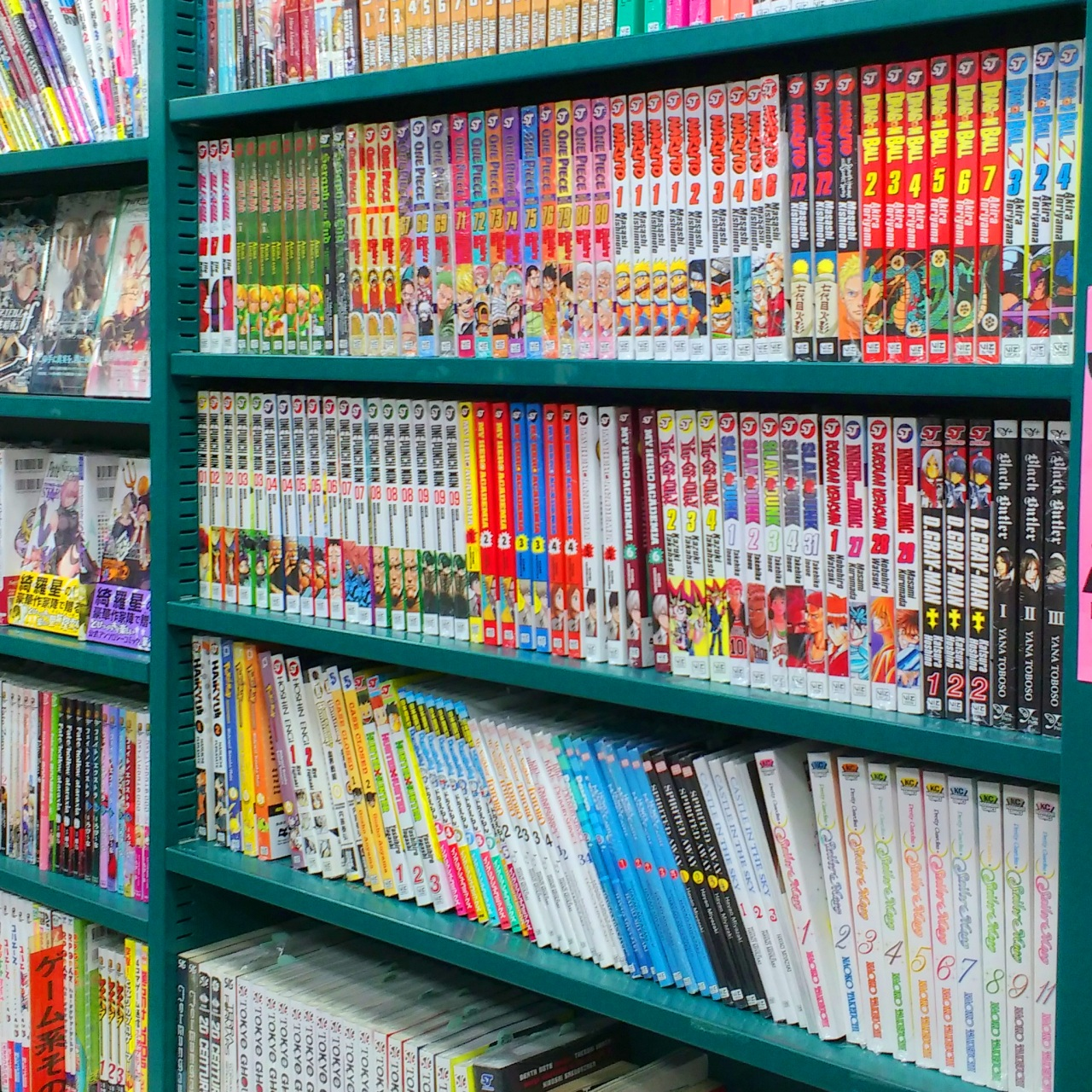
Manga bookstore in Kyoto

The word manga, when translated directly, means "whimsical drawings". Manga are not typically 'comic books' as the West understands them; rather, they represent pieces of Japanese culture and history. The 'manga' style has an extensive history, beginning sometime in the 10th century; scrolls from that period depict animals as part of the 'upper class', behaving as a typical human would in similar situations. Such scrolls would go on to be known as the Chōjū giga or "The Animal Scrolls".

Scrolls found later on in the 12th century would depict images of religion such as the Gaki Zoshi (Hungry Ghost Scrolls) and the Jigoku Zoshi (Hell Scrolls). While both dealt with various aspects of religion, unlike "The Animal Scrolls", these provided a more instructive viewpoint, rather than a comedic style.

Manga are more significant, culturally, than Western comic books (though many fill the same role). Originally, manga were printed in daily newspapers; in the Second World War, newsprint rationing caused a down-surge in manga popularity. In the post-war 1950s, they made a resurgence in the form of "picture card shows", which were a style of storytelling supplemented by the use of illustrations, and the highly popular "rental manga" that would allow their readers to rent these illustrated books for a period of time. Since the 1950s, manga has become an increasingly major part of the Japanese publishing industry.

Since their inception manga have gained a considerable worldwide consumer base.

== Doujinshi ==
Doujinshi is a Japanese word which refers to amateur manga and fanfictions. They follow the same steps of creation that manga have, and are often created by amateur authors who are manga fans. Doujinshi enable fans to create their own amateur manga involving their favorite manga characters in it. Fanfictions are really popular in Japan, where there is a biannual fair dedicated to doujinshi in Tokyo called Comiket.

== Video games ==
=== Introduction ===
Video gaming is a major industry all across the world, so much so that in 2012, global revenues were an estimated $67 billion for console and portable hardware and software, as well as games for mobile devices (e.g., tablets and smartphones). The presence and popularity of gaming in daily life in Japan in particular has been present for quite some time, with the earliest examples of this being well known game titles like Pac-Man first appearing in arcades. The beginning of the growth of Japanese game development is often identified with the golden age of video games, a period that is often accredited with saving the industry from what could have been its downfall. This time brought about many highly prominent developer studios in Japan, some of the first include Nintendo under Shigeru Miyamoto and Hiroshi Yamauchi, Sega during the same time period, and other companies such as Taito, Capcom, and Square Enix.

==== Arcade era ====
Video games when they first appeared in Japan were during the Arcade Era, which centers on the 1970–1980's. Lists of the most popular and well known arcade games include, but are not limited to, Defender and Galaga, Pac-Man, Frogger, Q*bert, Street Fighter, Donkey Kong, Mario, and many others. Many of these became popular enough that they influenced other industries, such as the film industry when many theaters started installing various arcade cabinets in their lobbies. These also were exported to other countries such as the United States, becoming similar cultural focal points in those regions as well and inspiring the creation of new companies and developers who would be dedicated to making games to try and claim part of this new market.

==== Console and computer games ====
Nintendo is known for producing some of the most successful video game franchises of all time.

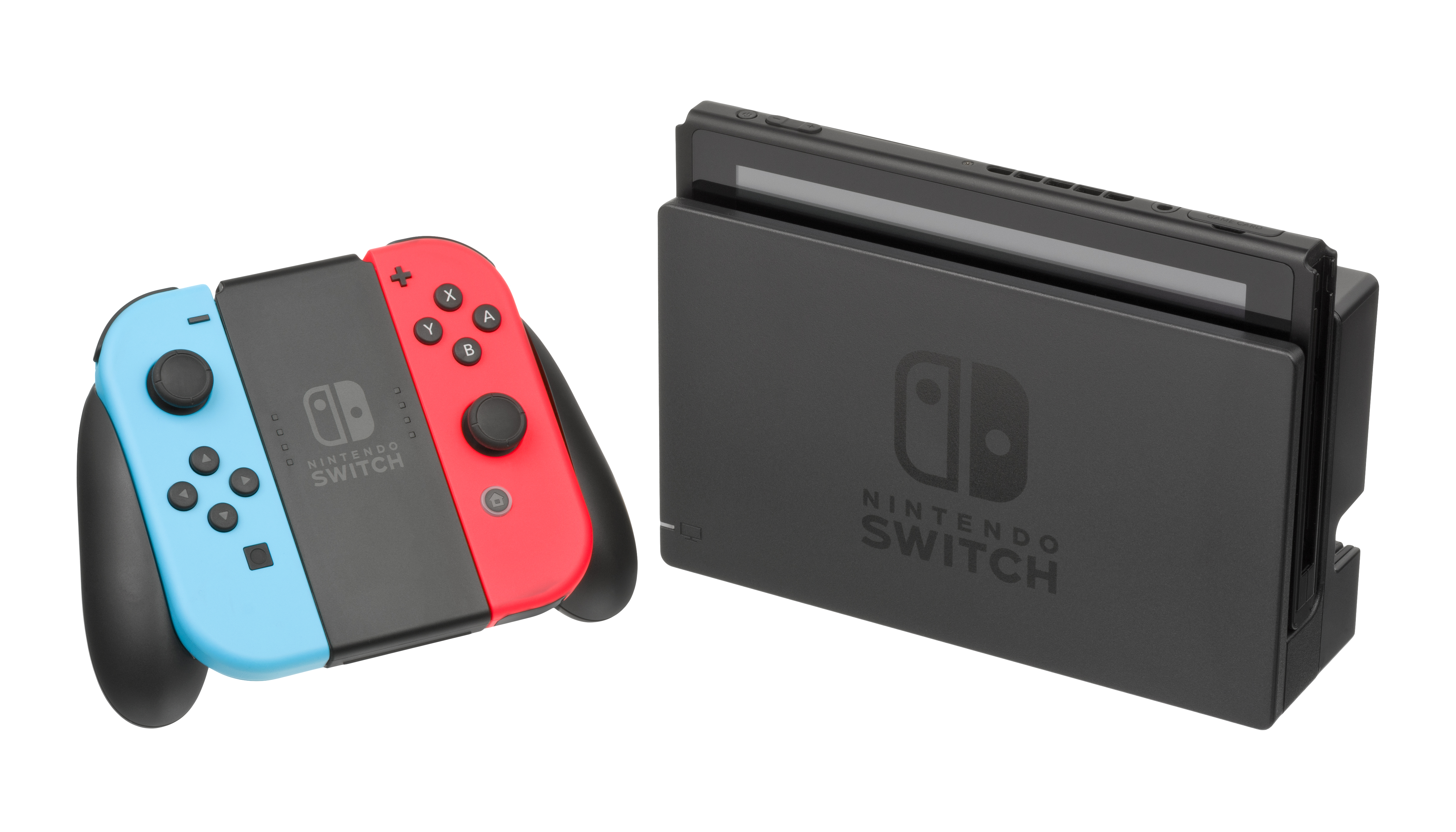
The Nintendo Switch, one of the best selling video game consoles of all time

In 1983, Nintendo released the Family Computer home video game console. In 1985, it was localized as the Nintendo Entertainment System in North America. Nintendo was not the first, as Atari released the Atari 2600 earlier in 1977, but because of the video game crash of 1983, it lost precedence and in that vacuum Nintendo superseded other companies and gained massive influence over the industry in North America. This was a noted development in games history and culture in Japan because, now that there was a hardware system that was reasonably affordable, people did not need to have the finances of a company to be able to afford to buy individual and very expensive game systems to play games. This initial dominance of the video games market by Nintendo continued in large part because of this initial hold they had taken of the market affording them a huge amount of economic and social weight as they were one of the only brands selling video games and, because they were one of the only developers, the globalization of Japanese media and games allowed Japanese industries and by extension culture to shape and control the industries development. While Nintendo since then has not been the penultimate dominating force in the industry, with contenders like Sony pulling ahead after the release of the PlayStation system and especially the PlayStation 2 becoming the most popular and widely sold system in the world, Japanese companies like these have still maintained dominance and popularity in the industry for various reasons, shifting the paradigm from being 'west' dominated to being Japan dominated. Due to this domination of the market and Japanese attitudes towards technology and culture, Japan became the cultural exporter of the video game world and has remained a major participant. Even in current day when there is international competition between companies, Japanese companies have always had at least a central role in the industry and in the advancement and trendsetting in games development.

Current Japanese video game franchises, such as Super Smash Bros., Pokémon, Mario, Sonic the Hedgehog, Kirby, Star Fox, Metroid, The Legend of Zelda, Castlevania, Animal Crossing, Splatoon, Kingdom Hearts, Shin Megami Tensei: Persona, Resident Evil, Dark Souls, Final Fantasy and Monster Hunter have gained worldwide popularity and domination in sectors of the industry, and are considered to have influenced what consumers expect from other games in similar genres. The Japanese game development engine RPG Maker has also gained popularity, with hundreds of games being created with it and released on Steam by the late 2010s.

==== Mobile games ====
Video games in Japan have expanded in number of ways since the times dominated by PC and console gaming. One of the most explosive ways this has occurred in Japan is the introduction and popularization of mobile games. In terms of economic relevance, the games for smartphones have expanded drastically from 2012. As a result, the market size of mobile games has a 70% share in the Japanese game industry. This economic presence is parallel to the social presence mobile games possess, with most people who play video games also playing mobile games as well. One theory for why mobile games are so popular in Japan is because of how they cater to social needs special to Japan. Because people in Japan spend time traveling on public transport so often and mobile games have extremely high portability as a result of being played on phones and other devices and have extremely low entrance costs (usually they are free to download) that download them so there is something to do while on the train is an obvious conclusion. In addition, they can also serve to promote interpersonal interaction and act as an activity that can be performed with friends, or to even introduce oneself and acquire new friends, which again thanks to their low cost can allow them to lower the barrier and anxiety of social interaction, partially alleviating loneliness which is a big social problem that is affecting a lot of the culture and media in Japan. This is why some have argued in their research that because social participation is becoming more online in nature, games like mobile games that are able to facilitate these interactions and relationships are becoming more important and popular as time goes on.

== Music ==
=== J-pop ===
Japanese popular music, known also as J-pop, can be traced back to the 1950s when the influence of the rock and roll era of music in the United States spread to Japan. The tone of kayokyoku varies from the time periods. During the 1920s, kayokyoku had a more traditional style while the 1950s adopted a drastic change from the 1920s.

This new kayōkyoku genre of music took influences from American "rock and roll" and jazz. The 1950s kayōkyoku would become the foundation for future J-pop artists and inspire other musicians to create their own style of J-pop. During the 1970s, artists such as Kuwata Keisuke would debut and create his rock band Southern All Stars which took inspiration from American blues and rock. Although kayōkyoku takes inspiration from Western styles of music, it has evolved into a style that branches off into different genres.

=== Anime song ===
Anime song, also shortened to anison is a genre of music directly originating from Japanese pop music. Anime songs are any music created for the opening or ending sequence of an anime series, often reflecting the show's themes or emotions of the main characters. The increase in voice actors beginning in the mid-2000s led to growing market interest in the genre and eventually with the rise of music streaming services like Spotify to its global popularity.

=== City pop ===
City pop is the term for a style of Japanese pop music that arose during a period of rapid economic growth and technological development in the 1970s and 80s. Influenced by contemporary trends in western music, City Pop was a uniquely Japanese take on the adult-oriented genres of the 70s and 80s like funk, disco, AOR and soft rock.

=== Visual kei ===
Visual kei (Japanese: ヴィジュアル系), also known as "visual style", is a prominent wave in Japan's music world that encapsulates bands with androgynous appearances who play a variety of music styles ranging from heavy metal to electronic. Similar to cosplay, visual kei artists typically cross- dress and flaunt very embellished costumes, make-up, and hairstyles. Not many of the bands include female members, however a majority of their audiences are young females.

Starting in the 1980s and rising to popularity in the 1990s, the first generation of visual kei was heavily influenced by western rock and metal musicians such as Kiss. One of the pioneers is a band called X Japan who are still active. Although, the first wave of visual kei came to an end at the time of X Japan's lead guitarists death in 1999. A few years later, the second wave called neo- visual kei transpired and took the genre onto a slightly different path than before.

== Internet ==
Internet in Japan did not take off until 1993 when the nation's government approved and installed its first commercial Internet service provider. Japan was the 14th country in the world to start using the internet; many reasons have been cited as the reason behind its slow movement such as bad timing, the government deeming internet access was more for academic use, fear of change and taking risks, an initial lack of competition in the telecommunications field, the difficulty of using a keyboard with a 2,000+ kanji-based language, and high rates causing hefty bills after just a few hours of internet usage. Until the mid-1990s, it was hard for Japanese society to access the internet and there was not much for them to do once they did get on. Once it did kick off, mobile phones were preferred over PCs or laptop computers, which has shaped how Japan's internet culture is interfaced, having to adapt to smaller screens and having a more leisurely attitude towards it.

=== Virtual idols ===
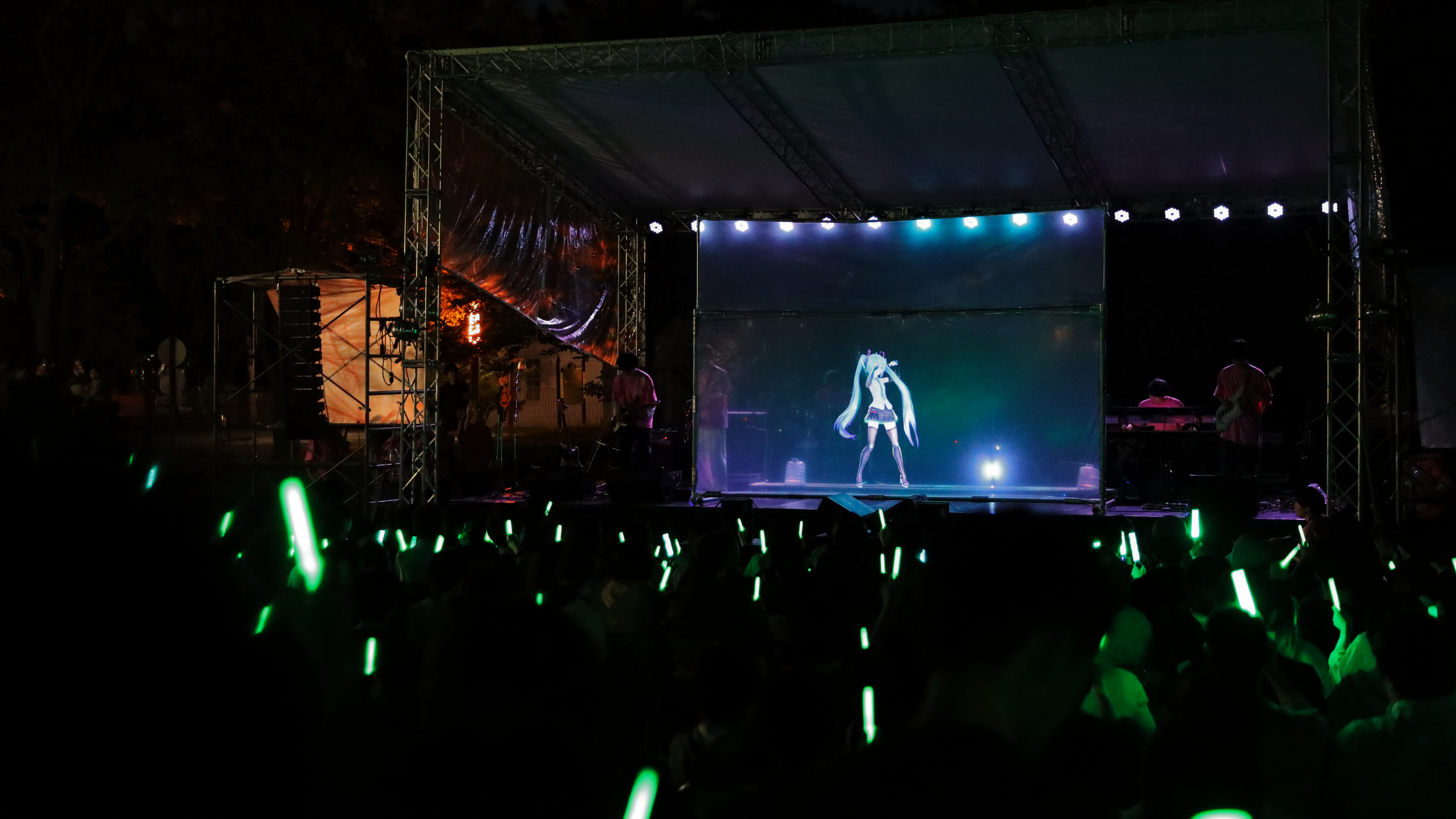
A Hatsune Miku concert. Throughout her history Miku has made a significant cultural impact on popular culture and the internet, spawning an entire media franchise.

The term "virtual idol" refers to an idol who exists only in the digital realm. The first Virtual Idol, Kyoko Date, was released by talent agency Horipro. Virtual Idols exist in a wide variety from Vocaloids like Hatsune Miku and Virtual YouTubers like Kizuna Ai. Virtual YouTubers, colloquially known as VTubers, are streamers with origins in Japan who use motion capture face tracking technology with their avatar models to move and show change in emotions. Since their conception Vtubers have managed to gain large global audiences and shape online streaming trends. Kizuna Ai is regarded as the first VTuber. After debuting in 2016, she has gained over 4.3 million subscribers across two YouTube channels — A.I. channel, and A.I. games. VTubers are different from virtual idols like Hatsune Miku in that behind the model is a real person, whereas Hatsune Miku and other Vocaloid are voicebanks consisting of databases of vocal samples provided by actors and singers. VTubers are generally individually operated(indie) or a part of a VTuber agency such as Nijisanji and Hololive. VTubers who are part of an agency have less control over their work, but are provided a more professional level of support such as professionally commissioned avatars and motion rigging. Currently, some of the most watched Japanese VTubers in the world are Usada Pekora from Hololive. She has accumulated 7.19 million hours watched in the first quarter of 2023. Kuzuha from Nijisanji is just slightly behind with 6.94 million hours watched and is also the most watched and subscribed male VTuber worldwide. Collaborations with product companies are also commonplace, such as the Neox Graphite x Nijisanji collaboration featuring six talents from both Japanese and English branches each having their own themed mechanical pencil and lead.

=== Internet cafés ===
Internet cafés in Japan are on the rise in popularity, not just as a place to hang out but as a place to live. These cafes offer internet access in small, private rooms the size of a cubicle with some offering services such as unlimited drinks, doubling as a manga cafe, showers, blankets, and use of the address to those that choose to live there. Internet cafes are now a haven for Net cafe refugees of all ages who would otherwise be homeless; many people can afford to rent out a room at one considering they are not expected to pay other bills that come with an apartment such as deposits, fees, furnishing a living space, and utilities. In 2018 the Tokyo Metropolitan Government conducted a survey using 502 internet and manga cafes in the Tokyo area and found through the information provided that an estimated 15,000 people stay at these cafes during the week with roughly 4,000 of this number being those that are homeless and the rest using the cafe instead of a hotel. A third of the guests claim to have unstable jobs. By age, the bulk of the guests are in their 30s with a smaller but still significant portion of people in their 50s. In 2008, the Health, Labor, and Welfare Ministry requested the budget for a program that would help internet cafe refugees gain permanent employment by offering a loan program for living expenses as long as they take classes on vocational job skills and training.

== Mobile phone culture ==
=== Keitai shousetsu (cell phone novel) ===
Keitai Shousetsu (lit. cell phone novel) was a phenomenon originally unique to Japan but spread quickly to other countries like China, India, Italy, Switzerland, Finland, South Africa, the US, and Brazil. Because of Japan's preference for mobile phones over computers, cell phone novels were an inexpensive way for amateur authors to get their works out into the world either by text message or email, eventually evolving into subscriptions via websites. Deep Love was the first of its kind, written in 2002 by Yoshi; it was adapted into manga series, a television show, and a film. The works were put out in short installments due to the character limit capability of a cell phone which is ideal for commuters to read in between train stops. Oftentimes, these works are put into print; in 2007, Japan saw ten of that year's bestselling novels derived from a cell phone novel. Considering they are mostly written by teenagers and young adults, they center on themes like relationships, drug use, pregnancy, rape, and prostitution. It is a trend that older adults are finding hard to indulge in because of the seemingly violent themes, use of emojis to convey emotion and save space, along with the absence of diverse and lengthy vocabulary.

=== Selfie ===
The modern selfie has origins in Japanese kawaii culture, particularly the purikura phenomenon of 1990s Japan. To capitalize on the purikura phenomenon, Japanese mobile phones began including a front-facing camera, which facilitated the creation of selfies, during the late 1990s to early 2000s. The iPhone 4 (2010) adopted the front-facing camera feature from earlier Japanese and Korean camera phones, and helped popularize the selfie internationally outside of East Asia. Photographic features in purikura were later adopted by smartphone apps such as Instagram and Snapchat, including scribbling graffiti or typing text over selfies, adding features that beautify the image, and photo editing options such as cat whiskers or bunny ears.

== See also ==
- Asian Century
- Akihabara
- Culture of Japan
- Glocalization
- Japanese studies
- Japanese idol
- Japanese pop culture in the United States
- Japanese influence on Korean culture
- Japanese influence on Chinese culture
- Japanophilia
- Lolita fashion
- Marriage in Japan
- Media mix
- Otaku
- Pachinko
- VTuber
