= Japanese pop culture in the United States =

There is significant awareness of Japanese popular culture in the United States. The flow of Japanese animation, fashion, films, manga comics, martial arts, television shows and video games to the United States has increased American awareness of Japanese pop culture, which has had a significant influence on American pop culture, including sequential media and entertainment into the 21st century. Japanese popular culture did not start to dominate the United States until the mid-to-late 1990s, as the majority of popular culture from Japan had to be heavily re-edited including anime and tokusatsu.

However, exceptions from states such as Hawaii and California catered Japanese audiovisual media (e.g. television, cinema) to local audiences in their original unaltered forms, with an example being the Honolulu television channel KIKU. In addition, there was physical media copies being sold in markets in Little Tokyo, Los Angeles, Japantown, San Francisco, and Japantown, San Jose, all located in California. These caterings were due to the large amount of Japanese-American population living in both Hawaii and California, and were shown not only to Japanese-Americans, but also to other ethnic groups in the two states.

== Overview ==
The reception of Japanese pop culture has typically been a mainly positively accepted one by the United States. While cultural influences are mainly Japanese as due to nation of origin, Japanese pop culture has gained its popularity by high quality and standard of artistic content for sequential media, from not just artistic style and composition, but to writing content, lack of expressive restriction by censorship and moral regulation of works allowed for syndication, diverse portrayals of genres and imaginative ideas explored throughout its library of works, and appealing to generally shared human ideals and the human condition regardless of boundary of nationality and ethnicity.

While anime, manga, and video games respectively have focus of themes and literary approaches unique from each other that define them independently, shared core elements between them allow familiarity for fans to interchange from medium to medium, and provides a sense of unity, consistency, and respected tradition as sequential art. For fans, this artistic consistency establishes common ground for a community as well as a kind of artistic movement and statement. This artistic consistency has been termed "anime style" or "anime" overall by global and American fans by need of identification, ease of recognition, and sense of historic and cultural origins, with manga and anime founded by Osamu Tezuka, and goes further than just tangible art style, writing, or general themes, instead being more like the soul of Japanese popular culture in itself.

=== History ===
Japanese popular culture gradually spread to the United States in several waves during the early-to-late 20th century:

- 1920s – International stardom of Sessue Hayakawa, whose fame rivaled that of Douglas Fairbanks or Charlie Chaplin
- 1940s – Arrival of Japanese martial arts, particularly karate in the United States.
- 1950s – Arrival of Japanese cinema, including jidaigeki (e.g. Kurosawa's samurai films) and Japanese science fiction (e.g. kaiju such as Godzilla), and judo in the US.
- 1960s – Arrival of anime on TV (e.g. Astro Boy, Speed Racer, Kimba the White Lion), Japanese electro-mechanical games in arcades (e.g. Sega's Periscope), and first example of Japanese popular music crossing over into the United States with "Sukiyaki" topping the Billboard Hot 100.
- 1970s – Japanese "chopsocky" karate martial arts films (e.g. Sonny Chiba) and Japanese arcade video games (e.g. Wheels, Gun Fight, Space Invaders).
- 1980s:
  - Golden age of arcade video games (e.g. Pac-Man, Frogger, Galaga, Pole Position) and arrival of Nintendo (e.g. Mario, Game & Watch, NES, Game Boy).
  - Ninjamania, including ninja films (e.g. Sho Kosugi films), cartoons (e.g. Teenage Mutant Ninja Turtles) and ninja video games (e.g. Shinobi and Ninja Gaiden).
  - Mecha robot fiction and toys, popularized by Americanized franchises based on Japanese mecha anime and toys (such as Transformers and Robotech).
  - Growth of karate, popularized by martial arts films (notably The Karate Kid series) and fighting games (notably Karate Champ).
- Early-to-mid-1990s:
  - Growth of fighting games (such as Street Fighter II and Fatal Fury) and Sega Genesis video game console (including games such as Sonic and Streets of Rage).
  - Mature anime on home video, including Japanese cyberpunk (e.g. Akira, Ghost in the Shell) and martial arts anime (e.g. Fist of the North Star, Street Fighter II).
  - Japanese superhero TV shows, including Americanized live-action tokusatsu (e.g. Power Rangers and VR Troopers) and magical girl anime (e.g. Sailor Moon).

In the mid-to-late 1990s, this culminated in Japanese pop culture having a significant impact in the United States, with anime, manga and Japanese video games becoming integrated into American pop culture. It made grassroots due to the cultural, social, moral, and altogether tied political landscape of the United States at the time:

- The Dark Age of Comic Books: With the increase of American comic books made solely for the comic book collector's merchandise speculator bubble upon The Death of Superman and poorly written examples of nuanced ambivalent morality by the character archetype known as the "90's comic book antihero", and the bankruptcy of DC Comics and Marvel Comics in 1996, these events would soon entrench comic books as disposable and forgettable male adolescent reading material. While long standing figures of comic books like traditional superheroes and Archie Comics would largely go unharmed in the cultural consensus, the failures and shortcomings of the American comic book industry had snowballed to the point where comic books struggled to uphold its artistic integrity and appeal to new readers into the mid to late 1990s. Anime and manga provided the alternative in the face of this, being able to provide content that was able to reach to both male and female demographics, provide dilemmas and stories that were well written, and showcased topics and subjects not restricted by the Comics Code.
- The revival and revitalizing of the video game market by Nintendo in 1988: Nintendo had helped to re-establish a market for video games in the United States after the video game crash of 1983, due in part that the crash had cemented video games as a dead end of unprofitable business in the electronics industry, and in turn, an untrustworthy investment. With Nintendo reviving the market and paving the way for other competitors and developers by its examples of video games that were of quality and were able to sell by their reputable reputation, this would become some of the first pivotal cultural entries and layouts Japanese popular culture would have to properly settle into American awareness.
- The rise of alternative media in the 1990s: American popular culture soon began to turn to more subversive forms of entertainment upon the end of the 1980s as response to the excesses and indulgences of the prior decade. Many examples include the rise of animated series aimed for older audiences like The Simpsons, Duckman, and Beavis and Butthead, the popularity of the social commentary laden dystopian sci-fi action movie Robocop, and backlash against the practices of the mainstream music industry upon the lip syncing debacle of pop duo Milli Vanilli. In regards to the context of Japanese popular culture within this subject, anime, manga, and video games provided both something "different" while at the same time presented relatable entertainment that resisted the far reaching influence of American politics and morality regarding the regulation of what can be presented and shown as entertainment.

== Anime in the United States ==
Anime differs from American animation in the range of its audiences and themes. Although there are anime for all different age groups, it is made for young teenagers and adults more often than are American cartoons, and often deals with more serious themes. Anime and manga incorporate a multitude of genres such as romance, action, horror, comedy, drama and cover a wide variety of topics like teen suicides, high school rivalries, and social commentary, and more subjects. Described as a gateway for many fans that takes them to a whole new culture; it is sometimes used as a way to learn about Japan. People who are avid devotees to anime in the United States affectionately refer to themselves as otaku, although in Japan the term is similar to geek, and is commonly frowned upon by society. Much like punk and goth, anime has become a subculture.

=== History ===
Anime culture in the United States began as a niche community that had a grassroots foundation built by groups of fans on the local level. Some of the earliest televised anime to air in the United States were Astro Boy, Speed Racer, and Gigantor, which gained popularity with many American audiences during the late 1960s. Speed Racer was watched by a total estimated audience of 40 million American viewers during the 1960s–1970s. Anime shows that aired in the United States up until the 1980s were usually heavily altered and localized, such as Science Ninja Team Gatchaman becoming Battle of the Planets in the 1970s, and the mecha show Macross becoming Robotech in the 1980s. Takara's Diaclone and Microman mecha toylines also became the basis for the Transformers franchise in the 1980s.

Small patches of isolated communities started to form around collective interest towards this new medium, which seemed reminiscent of familiar Disney visuals and Warner-Brothers narratives. One of these communities was the first anime fan club called the Cartoon/Fantasy Organization (C/FO), formed in Los Angeles, California during 1977; club actives involved monthly meets in order to watch newly aired anime. The early popularity was driven by fan-subtitled content and remained that way until much later, when inter-connected entrepreneurs from Japan and the United States saw an opportunity for business through this new medium. These business opportunities eventually led to the founding of Streamline Pictures, the United States' first anime import company in 1989, thus starting anime's widespread commercialization. Over the next dozen years, anime fans became more connected through fan-held conventions and the internet. These groups began to develop new social identities, centered around what they saw as an overall interconnected community.

A subculture began to grow around the United States revolving around people who identified with the social identity “Anime fan.” The imagined community built by the fandom since the earliest days was both the backbone and reason for the subculture's growth. Today, early 2000s anime shows like Pokémon have become almost universally recognized media in the United States.

The intrigue for anime in the United States has brought out celebrities to produce and star their voice in these series. For example, Michael B. Jordan, known for Black Panther & Creed, is starring in his own series and is producing the series Gen:Lock. This has helped the genre to grow and become more fruitful in sales.

Anime is now used by some American teachers to teach Japanese culture in classrooms. It draws student interest and may increase their contribution to the course. Many already had great interest in the art, mainly due to the popularity of Pokémon, making its use as a teaching tool very effective for them. Students who were not previously interested express curiosity towards this style of learning, and generally adapt with minimum difficulty.

=== Anime fan-culture ===
Although anime can be considered by some as distinctly Japanese animation, some scholars and fans relate to them by their animated nature similar to the works of Walt Disney. Researchers found that this created a subset of people that distinguish themselves from the similar subculture of Japanophiles. The fandom originally proliferated using participatory media via the nature of fan-subbing anime, or the English subtitling of the original Japanese shows. The fans of anime usually referred to as Otaku have been credited as the ones who ushered anime into America. Anime serves as a channel where many are initially introduced to Japanese culture and for others the only connection with Japan they can ever have. Some avid fans however choose to go the extra mile of visiting Japan in person to experience the culture they have viewed through the world of anime in real life. This voluntary labor connects people on a global scale as fans from all over the world participate in and benefit from the collective community's work. During the 1990s, industry officials viewed fan-subtitlers as useful to the budding Anime industry, as they used fan production to see where potentially profitable markets might lie. Interviews from some of the earliest fansubbers reveal that most of them subscribed to an unspoken code that they should not make a profit from their illegal activities. However, most distributors did ask to be reimbursed for the cost of the tape and for shipping. Whether through fansubbing or professional industry-translated anime and manga, the North American distribution of anime and manga has been primarily an import business for the Japanese-produced content. However, due to the nature of its roots, the fandom is better thought of as a hybrid of American and Japanese cultural notes. It is also viewed that the current generation are using their intense love for anime, which is a cultural object to distinguish themselves from prior generations.

Interview with modern-day anime fans reveal that some have no interest in its Japanese roots, and merely enjoy the fashion or other facets of fandom. Scholars highlight the increasing hybrid factor of anime caused by integrating North America's popular culture characteristics as a primary force behind the phenomenon. Because of the nature of imports, scholars found that the natural selectivity of anime importing by American companies cause the perception of anime to grow increasingly Western, as anime itself as a medium covers a broad range of genres.

Anime would go on to infiltrate one of the biggest cartoon networks in the United States, Cartoon Network, which in 1997 created Toonami, a special Saturday time slot for new and recurring popular series. Some anime, like Rurouni Kenshin, offered viewers fictionalized glimpses of the Meiji period and other elments of Japanese history. This influenced other American shows like Samurai Jack and Afro Samurai: Resurrection.

=== Anime conventions ===
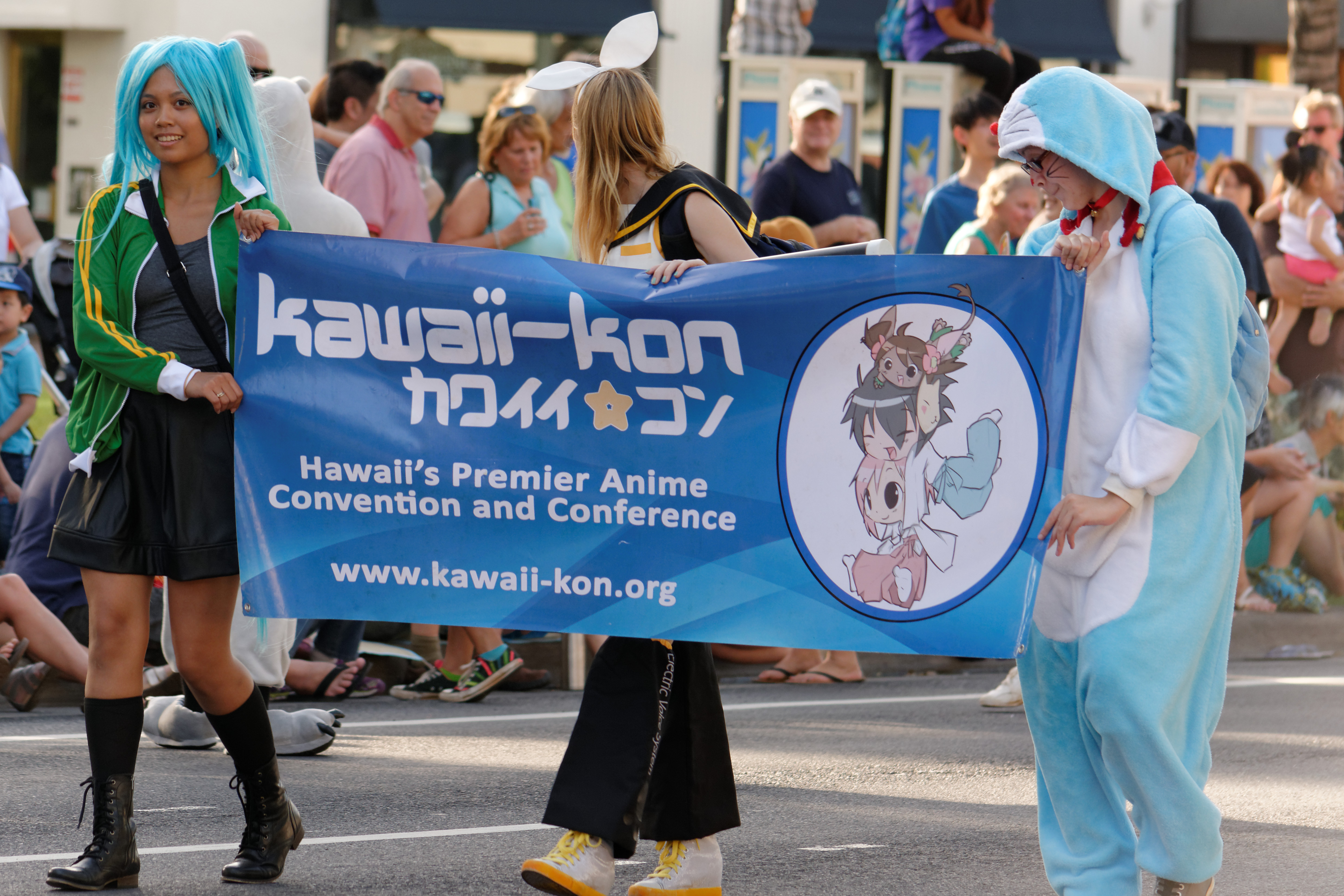
Cosplayers at Kawaii Kon, Honolulu, Hawaii

The primary function of anime conventions in the United States is to give a place to fans of anime, manga and Japanese culture. There are a range of informational panels offered at these conventions from the basics of Japanese language and culture to cutting edge news about anime releases in Japan and the US. Anime conventions also provide performances and vendors of Japanese goods, manga, anime, figurines and Anime related merchandise. Most American anime conventions are fan operated, the increase in popularity starting in the '90s, sprung forth a long-standing list of annual conventions, such as Anime Expo, AnimeFest, Anime NYC, Anime Frontier, Otakon, and Anime Boston, which continue to today with numbers of attendance reaching over 100,000.

=== Anime influence and sales ===
In the 1990s and early 2000s, anime's influence in North America exploded thanks to the runaway popularity of such series as Sailor Moon, Dragon Ball Z, and Pokémon. In the United States, the period referred to as "the golden age" of Japanese anime started from the middle of the 1990s. Anime sales to the United States were 3.2 times higher than revenue made from the exportation of steel from Japan to the States in 2003. Many people tapped into the booming anime market and developed consumer products that centered on the current lifestyle. It served as a bridge that connected Japan and America through artwork. In 2007, ICv2 estimated the size of the North American anime market at $275-300 million in retail dollars. Over time, Japanese studios began to simulcast anime in the U.S., beginning in 2008 and 2009 with shows like Naruto Shippuden, Fullmetal Alchemist: Brotherhood, and Inuyasha: The Final Act.

Many U.S. production companies pivoted to anime-inspired styles to attract viewers, influencing the creation of popular shows like Nickelodeon's Avatar: The Last Airbender, Cartoon Network's Teen Titans, and adult animated series The Boondocks (adapted from Aaron McGruder's comic strip of the same name). In the 2010s and 2020s, Japanese and U.S. studios increasingly collaborated on new anime properties, including the Netflix original series Neo Yokio and Castlevania.

== Fashion ==
Japanese street fashion trends have influenced Western fashion trends in the early 21st century. In the 2000s, Canadian popstars such as Avril Lavigne had an affinity for Japanese kawaii culture. Hello Kitty branded merchandise (such as clothing and other items) also became popular, generating more than $1 billion in annual North American retail sales. The origins of 2010s e-girl fashion has been traced to 2000s Japanese fashion trends including anime, cosplay, kawaii and lolita fashion styles.

=== Cosplay ===
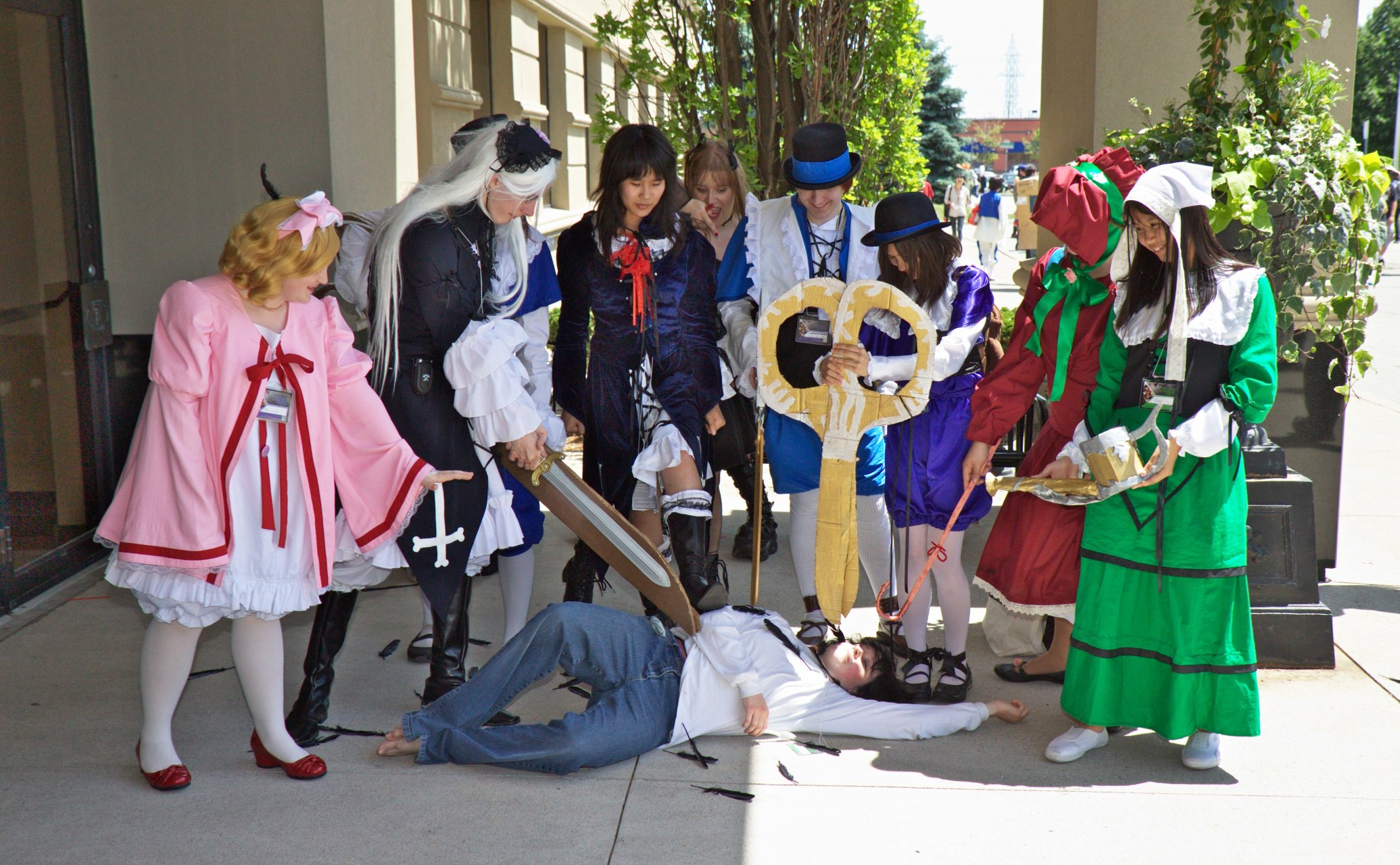
Cosplay of Rozen Maiden

The term "cosplay" corresponds to an abbreviation of the English words costume play, though the term was coined in Japan the practice is not solely Japanese. The use of the term cosplay applies to any costumed role play outside of theaters. Characters are often taken from popular Japanese fiction. Popular sources that fans draw from include anime, manga, video games, comic books, and graphic novels. American cosplayers practice this form of fandom at anime conventions. However, there are a growing number of web pages and photo sites dedicated to the art of cosplaying, such as DeviantArt and Cosplay.com.

== Live-action film and television ==
The following Japanese live-action film and television genres have also had a significant influence on American popular culture:

- Jidaigeki (Japanese historical fiction)
  - Samurai cinema (chanbara) – examples include Akira Kurosawa films such as Seven Samurai, The Hidden Fortress and Yojimbo
  - Ninja fiction – see ninjas in popular culture and ninja films
- Tokusatsu (Japanese science fiction)
  - Kaiju (monster films) – examples include Godzilla, Gamera and Ultraman
  - Henshin Heroes and Sentai (superhero shows) – examples include Ultraman, Kamen Rider, Super Sentai (Power Rangers) and Metal Hero (VR Troopers and Big Bad Beetleborgs) franchises
  - Kyodai Heroes (giant hero and robot shows) – examples include the Ultraman franchise, Gridman, and Daitetsujin 17
- Japanese television drama – examples include manga adaptations such as Great Teacher Onizuka, Hana Yori Dango and Nodame Cantabile
- Japanese horror – examples include the Ring and Grudge franchises

== Manga in the United States ==
The translation of Japanese manga into English, in turn, led English-speaking artists and writers to develop manga-inspired comics of their own. These were branded as original English-language manga (OEL manga for short) or "AmeriManga". Many OEL manga adapt an existing piece of entertainment, such as licensed Disney properties, but the category also includes original stories like Becky Cloonan's Eisner Award-nominated East Coast Rising. Some in the industry, like Viz Media publicity director Evelyn Dubocq, have asserted that the term is a misnomer because "manga" refers specifically to comics originating from Japan.

=== Manga influence and sales ===
In 2004, then-CBR columnists Joe Casey and Matt Fraction described the increase of manga sales in the United States as "the 900-pound bear in the comics shop. Inescapable, unavoidable, and impossible to ignore, the manga explosion is either going to go away – which is bad, as so many mass-market bookstores seem to be bulking up their comics supply based on manga's lead – or manga will continue to grow – also bad, as the direct market scrambles to keep up. The entire industry is being forced, month by month, little by little, into a paradigm shift not seen since the advent of the direct market in the early '80s, all thanks to these strange little books from far away."

With the popularity of manga on the rise, graphic novel artists in the U.S. began to adapt their styles to match those found in manga. Celebrities also dipped into the market like rock star Courtney Love, who co-wrote the manga Princess Ai with Tokyopop founder Stu Levy. Calvin Reid of Publishers Weekly estimated that the "[t]otal U.S. manga sales in 2007 rose about 10%, to more than $220 million, and about 1,468 titles are estimated to have been released last year."

In October 2019, industry analyst Milton Griepp presented data at an ICv2 conference in New York showing that for the first time in decades, the U.S. comic book market was dominated not by traditionally American monthly superhero comics, but graphic novels and trade paperbacks of other genres. Manga and manga-inspired books were particularly popular (as well as titles aimed at younger readers, such Dav Pilkey’s Dog Man and Raina Telgemeier’s Guts), which saw high sales in bookstores, though the shift was also reflected in comic shops. According to data by Bookscan, child-oriented comics and graphic novels accounted for 41% of sell-through at bookstores, with manga at 28%, while books of the superhero genre constituted less than 10% – a drop of 9.6% year-over-year.

Manga sales across North America skyrocketed in 2020, reaching all-time highs. By the mid-2020s, manga had grown into a force shaping the North American book market as a whole; Bookscan data in 2023 estimated that manga sales had already quadrupled since 2020, making up almost 49% of all graphic novels sold in the U.S. The art form's rise to prominence also increased Western interest in graphic fiction from other countries, particularly Chinese manhua and South Korean manhwa, on platforms such as Webtoon. Despite a significant dropoff soon after – driven in part by a shrinking of the Japanese market – U.S. manga sales rebounded between 2025 and 2026, as the industry showed signs of stabilization.

In 2024, comic book writer James Tynion IV said that the 21st century manga explosion brought an appetite for "a much wider breadth of types of storytelling" to the U.S. direct market, allowing creators to explore many different genres rather than needing to "make [their work] a little superhero-y to sell a copy".

== Martial arts ==
Popular Japanese martial arts include judo, ju-jitsu, aikido, and Okinawan martial arts such as karate.

== Music ==
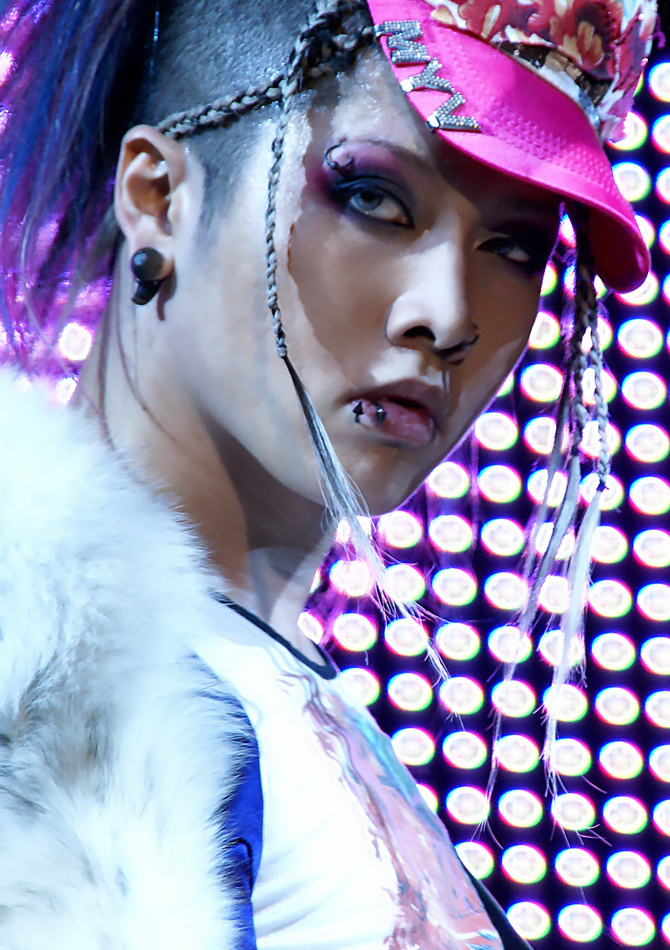
Miyavi

Japanese pop and rock music acts are also increasing in popularity amongst US listeners. Such artists include L'Arc-en-Ciel, Miyavi, T.M.Revolution, Hikaru Utada, Asian Kung-Fu Generation, Dir En Grey, Yellow Magic Orchestra, and Susumu Hirasawa. Growing in popularity by the year these performers have toured the United States at least twice playing at small venues in Boston, New York City and Los Angeles each time increasing their fan base. Japanese American artist Hikaru Utada released an English debut album in 2004, her single "Devil Inside" topped the Billboard Hot Dance/Club Airplay charts. Dir En Grey, in early 2006 started touring the US. Japanese idols, like Morning Musume, AKB48 and S/mileage are now becoming known in the US thanks to the internet. In 2009, Morning Musume performed at Anime Expo and in 2010 AKB48 played there. Also in 2010, influential metal band X Japan performed their first US tour, selling out most shows. In April 2011, Berryz Kobo played at an anime convention in Washington. Japanese manga art has also influenced American music artists and singers, such as Pharrell Williams whose music video It Girl (Pharrell Williams song) contains a wide array of anime style artwork. Even the electronic musicians Daft Punk have collaborated with Japanese studio Toei Animation to produce Interstella 5555, a film based on their album Discovery.

Vocaloid music is also popular in the US, with Miku Expo being held every 3 years in venues around the United States,

== Video games ==
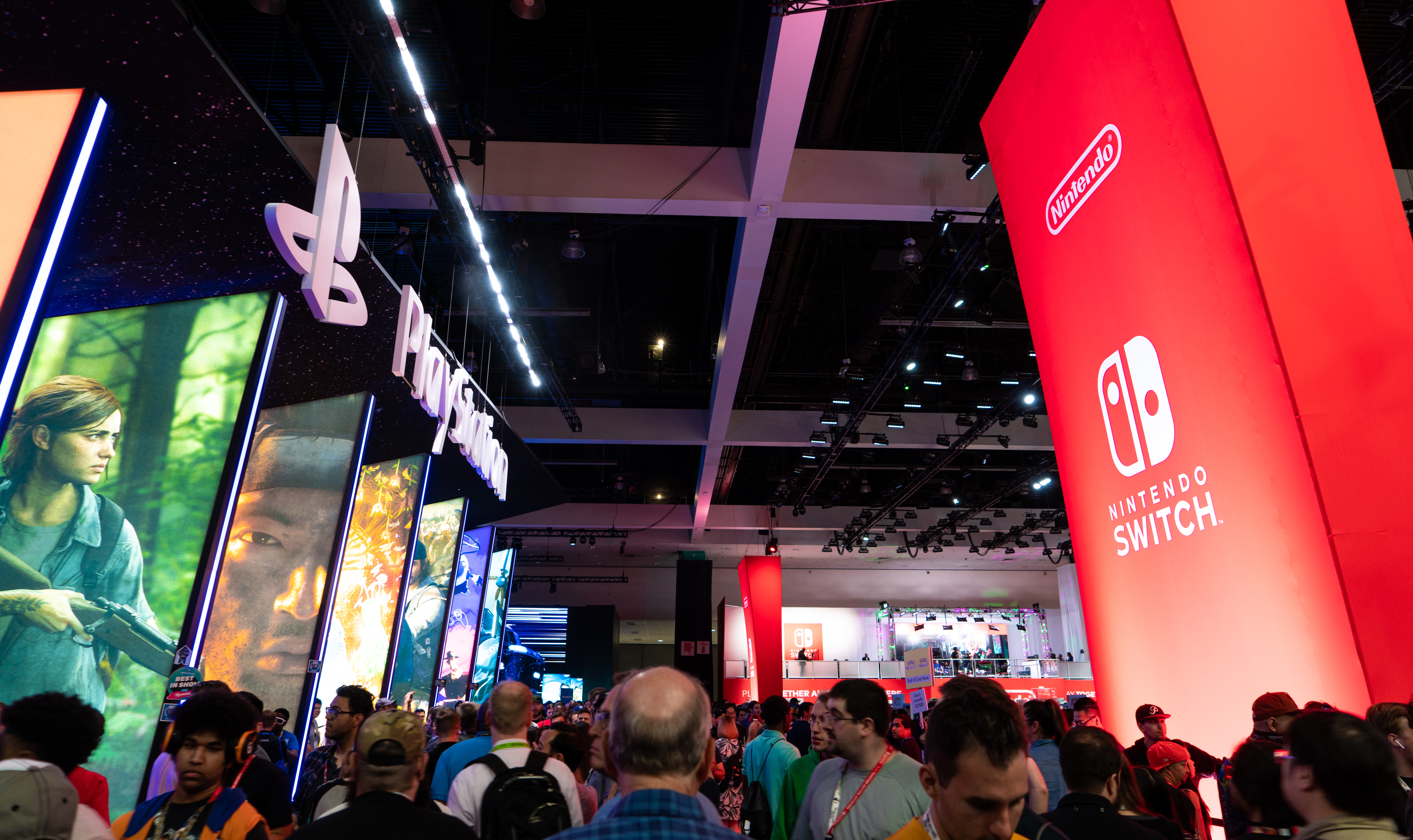
Nintendo and PlayStation booths at E3, Los Angeles, California

Since the early 1970s, Japan has been home to some of the most prominent and influential video game companies in the world; some of the most well-known include Nintendo, Sega, Sony, Namco, Capcom, Konami and Square Enix. The games produced by the companies are well known across the world, including famous arcade games such as Space Invaders and Pac-Man, and popular franchises such as Mario, The Legend of Zelda, Final Fantasy, Metal Gear, Street Fighter, Sonic the Hedgehog, Pokémon and Resident Evil. Numerous Japanese games have been listed among the best games of all time, and have spawned sequels, remakes and adaptations.

== See also ==
- Japanese popular culture
- Anime
- Manga
