= Americanization (foreign culture and media) =

Editing of foreign TV content bought by an American station

In American media, the term Americanization is used to describe the censoring and editing of a foreign TV show or movie that is bought by an American station. This editing is done with the aim of making the work more appealing to American audiences, and to respond to perceived American sensitivities. The changes can be so drastic that little—if any—evidence of the TV show or movie's true origin remains.

For television documentaries, it is an established practice in English-speaking countries to hire someone of the audience's accent as a narrator. Sometimes the script is done verbatim, e.g., the PBS Nova documentary series continued to use the BBC's original word "maize", whereas an American audience would expect to hear "corn".

== Media ==
In Hollywood, many foreign film productions (most of them from Europe and the Far East) are remade into U.S.-produced versions for American viewers - adapting the story to conform to American culture. Most of these "Americanized" versions are filmed in American places, and with English-speaking actors. Examples include Godzilla, Point of No Return (a.k.a. Nikita), My Father the Hero, The Office, The Ring and House of Cards. In some cases, an original story from a foreign country is Americanized by recasting its lead characters as American; an example of this was the first adaptation of the James Bond novel, Casino Royale, which was produced for CBS Television in 1954. In this version, the character of Bond — a British agent in the original novel and subsequent movie series — is changed into an American agent for the TV version.

Americanization is particularly common with the localization of Japanese pop culture in the United States. An example of this is Power Rangers, which uses an English speaking cast playing new characters and dubbing over stock footage from its original Japanese counterpart Super Sentai. Other examples include dub localizations of anime as well as video game localizations.

== See also ==
- Americanization (immigration)
- Assimilation of immigrants
  - Immigration to the United States of America
  - Melting pot
  - Salad bowl (cultural idea)
- Editing of anime in American distribution

=== References ===
- Neil Campbell, Jude Davies and George McKay, eds. (2004) Issues in Americanisation and Culture (Edinburgh: Edinburgh University Press). ISBN 0-7486-1943-7.
