= Cell phone novel =

Work written on a cellular phone via texting

Cell phone novels, or mobile phone novels (Japanese: 携帯小説, Hepburn: keitai shōsetsu; Chinese: 手機小說; pinyin: shǒujī xiǎoshuō), are literary works originally written on a cellular phone via text messaging. This type of literature originated in Japan, where it became a popular literary genre. However, its popularity also spread to other countries internationally, especially to China, United States, Germany, Italy and South Africa. Chapters usually consist of about 70–100 words each due to character limitations on cell phones.

Phone novels started out primarily read and authored by young women on the subject of romantic fiction such as relationships, lovers, rape, love triangles, and pregnancy. However, mobile phone novels gained worldwide popularity on broader subjects. Rather than appearing in printed form, the literature was typically sent directly to the reader via email, SMS text message, or subscription through an online writing and sharing website, chapter by chapter. Japanese Internet ethos regarding mobile phone novels is dominated by pen names and forged identities. Therefore, identities of the Japanese authors of mobile phone novels are rarely disclosed.

Japanese cell phone novels were also downloaded in short installments and run on handsets as Java-based mobile applications in three different formats: WMLD, JAVA and TXT. In 2007, 98 cell phone novels were published into books. Koizora was a popular phone novel with approximately 12 million views on-line, written by "Mika", that was not only published but also adapted into a movie. Five out of the ten best selling novels in Japan in 2007 were originally cell phone novels.

== History ==
Messaging with pagers became popular with teenage girls in Japan in the 1990s, and the popularity of mobile communication devices eventually gave way to the development of literary genres based on these new media forms. The use of compact and highly contextual writing is a well-established part of Japanese literary tradition, and cell phone novels have been compared to classic Japanese literature such as the 11th-century Tale of Genji. The first cell phone novel was "published" in Japan in 2003 by a Tokyo man in his mid-thirties who calls himself Yoshi. His first cell phone novel was called Deep Love, the story of a teenager engaged in "subsidized dating" (enjo kōsai) in Tokyo and contracting AIDS. It became so popular that it was published as an actual book, with 2.6 million copies sold in Japan, then spun off into a manga, a television series, and a film. The cell phone novel became a hit mainly through word of mouth and gradually started to gain traction in Taiwan, China, and South Korea among young adults. In Japan, several sites offer large prizes to authors (up to $100,000 US) and purchase the publishing rights to the novels.

Kiki, the pseudonymous author of I, Girlfriend won the Japan Keitai Novel Award in 2008.

The movement also became popular in Europe, Africa and North America. In 2005, Random House purchased a share in Vocel, a San Diego–based company which mobile study guides. In Europe it started in about 2007, promoted by people like Oliver Bendel and Wolfgang Hohlbein, and publishers such as Cosmoblonde or Blackbetty Mobilmedia. Teenagers in South Africa have been downloading an m-novel called Kontax – a novel specifically written for mobile phones. The pioneer cell phone novel in North America, a novel called Secondhand Memories by Takatsu – that can be viewed on Textnovel, the first English language cell phone novel site founded in the United States – has been viewed more than 60,000 times and published in print in 2015 as a paperback.

== Reason for popularity ==
Although Japan was the original birthplace of the cell phone novel, the phenomenon soon moved to other parts of East Asia, and many of the online writers are university students. These writers understand what narratives will attract young readers, incorporating emergent events or trendy elements from teen culture into their stories.

Cell phone novels create a virtual world for teenagers via the mobile phone, or, more precisely, via text messages. As in virtual online video games, readers can put themselves into first person in the story. Cell phone novels create a personal space for each individual reader.

The cell phone novel is changing reading habits; readers no longer need to physically go to a bookshop and purchase a book. They can go online using their cell phone, download a novel, and read it on their personal mobile phone anywhere, any time they wish. Similar to the e-book, its mobility and convenience saves time.

== See also ==
- Drabble
- Constrained writing
- Verse novel
- Japanese mobile phone culture
- SMS
- Texting
- Light novel
- Visual novel
- Chat fiction
- Web fiction
