= Deep Love =

Japanese cell phone novel

- Genre: Tragedy
- Serial novel
- Written by: Yoshi
- Published by: Starts Publishing
- Original run: December 25, 2002 – July 2003
- Volumes: 4
- Manga

Deep Love: Ayu no Monogatari
- Written by: Yoshi
- Illustrated by: Yū Yoshii
- Published by: Kodansha
- Magazine: Bessatsu Friend
- Original run: May 13, 2004 – September 13, 2004
- Volumes: 2
- Manga

Deep Love: Real
- Written by: Yoshi
- Illustrated by: Tetsu
- Published by: Kodansha
- Magazine: Weekly Young Magazine
- Original run: February 10, 2005 – February 5, 2010
- Volumes: 19
- Manga

Deep Love: Pao no Monogatari
- Written by: Yoshi
- Illustrated by: Akiyo Kurosawa
- Published by: Kodansha
- Original run: February 10, 2005 – August 11, 2006
- Volumes: 2
- Manga

Deep Love: Host
- Written by: Yoshi
- Illustrated by: Yū Yoshii
- Published by: Kodansha
- Magazine: Bessatsu Friend
- Original run: February 10, 2005 – June 13, 2005
- Volumes: 2
- Live-action film
- Directed by: Yoshi
- Music by: Kawashima Ai
- Released: April 3, 2004
- Television drama

Ayu no Monogatari
- Original network: TV Tokyo
- Original run: October 1, 2004 – December 24, 2004
- Episodes: 13
- Television drama

Host
- Original network: TV Tokyo
- Original run: January 7, 2005 – March 25, 2005
- Episodes: 12
- Manga

Deep Love: Reina no Unmei
- Written by: Yoshi
- Illustrated by: Yū Yoshii
- Published by: Kodansha
- Magazine: Bessatsu Friend
- Published: January 13, 2006

Deep Love is a Japanese cell phone novel series written by Yoshi, and is officially the first in its literary genre. The series includes four novels which were later published by Stars Publishing from December 2002 and July 2003. The series launched with Deep Love: Ayu no Monogatari, followed by Deep Love: Host, Deep Love: Reina no Unmei, and Deep Love: Pao no Monogatari.

After 2.6 million book copies were sold in Japan, the Deep Love novels were adapted into five manga series: three illustrated by Yū Yoshii, and one each drawn by Tetsu and Akiyo Kurosawa. Deep Love has also had two live-action series air on TV Tokyo: Ayu no Monogatari (2004) and Host (2005). A live-action film was released in theaters in 2004. Literary critic Minako Saitō panned the novels, suggesting that if it had been entered into a new writer competition in a literary magazine, it would have been rejected in the first round. She goes on to say that there might not even be any need to review such a work.

== Synopsis ==
=== Ayu no Monogatari ===
This series follows Ayu, a high school girl who moonlights as a prostitute. She views the world as filthy, hypocritical, and hedonistic, and believes that money is the most important thing in the world. She lives with her boyfriend Kenji, a gigolo with a drug problem, and spends her school days with her friend Reina, her only friend.

Ayu's outlook on life changes after she meets an old woman, even going so far as to adopt Pao, an abused stray dog. However Ayu ends up betraying the old woman by stealing money that was intended to be used on an operation for her "son" Yoshiyuki. Ayu steals the funds to help her boyfriend, who ends up dying before he could repay the cash.

Ayu tries to repay the money by honest means, but is forced to return to prostitution. In the meantime Ayu's friend Reina has started prostituting herself. She's bullied by several of her classmates, who trick her into going to a karaoke bar with them – only for them to abuse her and carve "whore" onto her leg before leaving Reina to be raped by several boys.

Ayu eventually graduates from school and develops a friendship with Yoshiyuki after the death of the old woman. She eventually manages to raise 2 million yen, the amount the old lady stated was needed for the operation, and gives it to Yoshiyuki's father – only to discover that the operation costs 10 million. Unbeknownst to Ayu, Yoshiyuki's father ends up spending it on frivolities and fun rather than on his son.

Ayu continues to prostitute herself, but is slowly beginning to waste away. She finally realizes that she has AIDS. With the last of her strength, Ayu sends Pao to deliver Yoshiyuki his Christmas gift; a necklace which means eternal love, he returns the gesture with a recorded CD telling her that he wants to take her to Okinawa. Ayu finally collapses after hearing this and quietly passes away as it begins to snow. 3 years later Yoshiyuki is seen at her grave and passes Reina and her child – also named Ayu.

=== Real ===
Real follows Yoshiyuki, who is reeling from the death of Ayu. He decides to become a host after visiting the host club Platinum in Shibuya. Yoshiyuki's choice is met with open scorn by everyone except for Taku, Platinum's number one host, who believes that he could become something more.

=== Pao no Monogatari ===
This story arc is told from the perspective of Pao, Ayu's dog. After experiencing neglect and abandonment from his owners, Pao watches his mother slowly starve to death. He's separated from his siblings and wanders around the city, gaining further abuse from various people.

=== Host ===
Host picks up Yoshiyuki's story, as he continues to try to survive after Ayu's passing. He's emotionally unstable and is willing to do anything to kill the pain, including working at a host bar and becoming a prostitute.

=== Reina no Unmei ===
After she's raped in a karaoke bar, Reina becomes pregnant and decides to carry the baby to term. She has a baby girl, who Reina names Ayu after her now-deceased friend. As time passes Reina falls in love with a boy and decides to confess that she's a single mother, only for him to promptly break up with her. To make matters worse, Ayu takes a tumble down the stairs, necessitating emergency surgery. As a result, Ayu is now blind, which threatens to shatter Reina's happiness forever.

== Characters ==
Ayu (アユ)
A high school girl who has a bleak view of the modern world. To Ayu, this world is filthy and sex is just a tool that earns her money. She lives with her gigolo-boyfriend Kenji, who is a drug addict. One day, Ayu meets an elderly woman who she calls Granny. Granny is the exact opposite of Ayu – she sees more good in the world than evil. She plants a seed in a pot and tells Ayu that when it sprouts she will give her the plant. Ayu believes that such an outlook is fruitless and walks away. As the story progresses, Ayu's outlook of the world begins to change, but not without a series of challenges and setbacks.

One day, Ayu finds 1.5 million yen in Granny's drawer, which she is saving for her "son" Yoshiyuki. Ayu "borrows" the money to help Kenji, whose drug addiction has gotten the better of him. When Kenji dies, Ayu sells her body to earn the money back. She also finds out that her friend Reina has been raped. An infuriated Ayu exacts revenge on the leader, Keiko. Ayu later reveals to Granny that she had taken the money for Yoshiyuki's surgery to help her boyfriend and he had wasted it. She also reveals that she is trying to earn it back by prostitution. Granny does not respond to this. After Granny's death, Ayu vows to earn the money back without selling her body. At this point, Ayu completely changes, her outlook is not as grim as it initially was, now that she feels that she has a purpose.

Reina (レイナ)
A cheerful high school girl who adores Ayu. Reina is easily influenced. She gets introduced to the world of prostitution when she is with Ayu. When Reina's classmates, led by Keiko, find out that she is prostituting herself, they take her wallet, write the word "whore" on her leg with a knife, and let some boys rape her. As she is being raped, the girls sing karaoke next door without a care in the world and feeling justified in their actions. This lands Reina in the hospital and the girls' actions infuriate Ayu. Reina drops out of school after the incident, but remains close friends with Ayu. She finds out that she is pregnant as a result of the rape and decides to keep the child. She names her daughter Ayu after her friend. Deep Love: Reina no Unmei is a continuation of Deep Love: Ayu no Monogatari. It is told from Reina's perspective.
Granny
An elderly woman who seems to have an unfailing faith and hope in the world in spite of her own tragic past. She is the exact opposite of Ayu – she believes that the world is not as filthy and horrible as Ayu believes it is. Granny is generous and forgiving, she takes Ayu and Pao into her home. Granny reveals that she had a "son" named Yoshiyuki, an abandoned boy with a heart condition. She had spent many years saving money for Yohsiyuki's surgery. She had only saved 1.5 million – she needs 2 million to help him. Yoshiyuki's father takes him back when he realizes that he and his new wife could not have children. Granny tried to keep Yoshiyuki, but lost the case in court. Granny's actions, faith, and hope are the catalyst in the changes in Ayu's outlook.
Yoshiyuki (義之)
A 17-year-old boy born with a heart condition that Granny had taken in when his father had abandoned him. He is adopted by Granny only to be taken back by his father when he and his new wife could not conceive a child of their own. He does not seem to have any affection towards his father and step-mother. Both are very strict and only allow Yoshiyuki to stay out for an hour. He does not have any friends as a result. He is very close to Granny and is upset when he hears of her death. He and Ayu become close after Granny's death and meet at a bench near his home. He reveals to Ayu that he would like to see the Okinawan sky because of how Granny would tell him to look up at the sky when life becomes difficult. Ayu promises to take him there, and she eventually keeps her promise. For a moment, Granny's words ring true. However, his father tracks them down with the help of the police and this results in Ayu being put in jail. Deep Love: Host is a continuation of Deep Love: Ayu no Monogatari – it is told from Yoshiyuki's perspective.
Pao (パオ)
An abused puppy that Ayu finds in a box. He is nursed back to health by Ayu and Granny. Pao is protective of both Granny and Ayu, and is an excellent messenger. He does not easily trust strangers; however, he takes an immediate liking to Yoshiyuki. Deep Love: Pao Monogatari is a side story that is told from Pao's perspective. The short series ends with Pao dying right next to Ayu.
